= Robert S. Beightler =

American major general who served in WWII

Robert Sprague Beightler
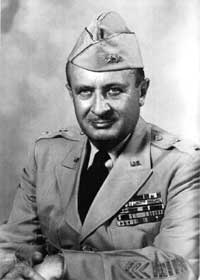
- Born: March 21, 1892; Marysville, Ohio, U.S.
- Died: February 12, 1978 (aged 85) Worthington, Ohio, U.S.
- Buried: Oakdale Cemetery, Marysville, Ohio
- Allegiance: United States
- Branch: United States Army
- Service years: 1911–1953
- Rank: Major General
- Commands: 37th Infantry Division
- Conflicts: Border War; Pancho Villa Expedition; World War I; World War II; Operation Cartwheel; Bougainville campaign; New Georgia campaign; Philippines campaign; Battle of Manila; Battle of Baguio; Occupation of Japan; Korean War
- Awards: Distinguished Service Cross; Distinguished Service Medal; Silver Star; Purple Heart; Legion of Merit; Combat Infantryman Badge
- Other work: Engineer, owner of private engineering firm

Robert Sprague Beightler (March 21, 1892 – February 12, 1978) was a United States Army two-star general and Ohio political insider, engineer, and business owner. In the military, he reached the rank of major general, and served as military governor of Okinawa, War Department General Staff, and as commander of the 37th Infantry Division, one of only two National Guard generals to lead their troops through training and into battle during World War II. In political activities in Ohio, he served as head of the Ohio State Highway Department, president of the Army Personnel Board, executive director and board member of the Ohio Turnpike Commission.

Beightler was the only World War II National Guard general to command his division for the length of the war. In addition to being one of only eleven generals who commanded their divisions for the entire war and the longest-serving of these eleven, Beightler was appointed to the Regular Army in 1946 as one of only two National Guard major generals to receive such an appointment at that time.

== Early life ==
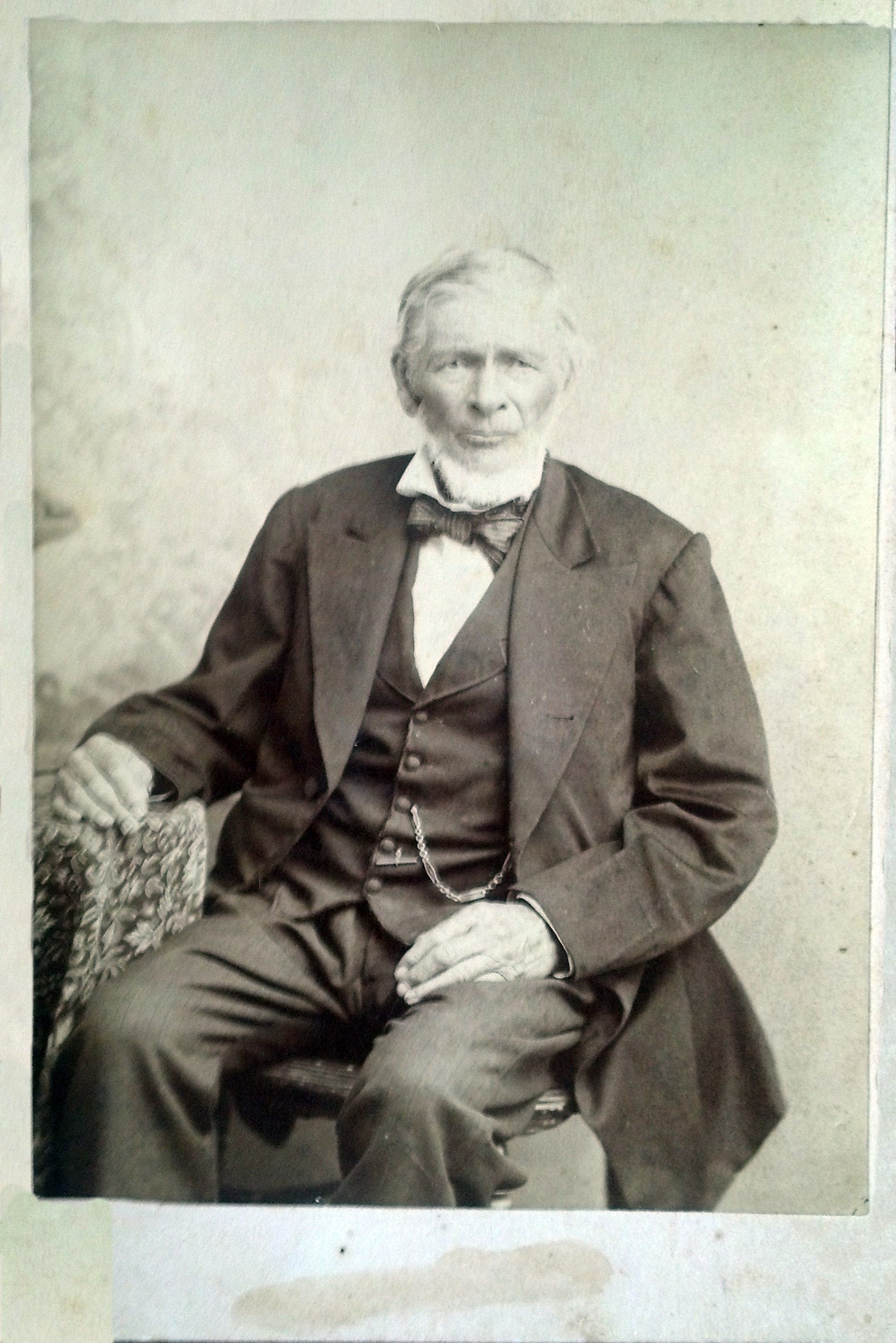
Tobias Beightler, pictured here in 1884, was an Ohio pioneer and the ancestor of Robert. Tobias married Sarah Amrine, granddaughter of the first permanent settler of Marysville Abraham Amrine. The name Beightler is derived from Bigler.

Beightler was born on March 21, 1892, in Marysville, Ohio, of diverse European descent. He was the son of William P. Beightler, an elected local surveyor, city and state engineer. His father was also the president of the Perfect Cigar Company. His mother was Joana Sprague, daughter of Franklin B. Sprague and a cousin of Cdre. Oliver Hazard Perry, Gov. William Sprague IV, and U.S. Senator William Sprague III.

Beightler's paternal ancestors came from Germany, having immigrated to and settled in Berks County, Pennsylvania, in the 18th century. In the early 19th century, those ancestors were some of the first pioneers of the western United States, first settling in eastern Ohio, and eventually in Marysville. Tobias Beightler, the patriarch of the Marysville Beightlers, was a cowboy who squatted on land in Marysville before settling into society. They served in the American Revolution, and in the American Civil War, among other early United States conflicts.

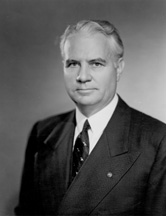
1944 U.S. vice presidential candidate John W. Bricker was Beightler's best man at his wedding.

Beightler was raised in a devout Presbyterian family that stressed church, community, service, duty, and patriotism. They lived on the west side of Marysville on 7th street. As a young man he learned from his father's industriousness and grew vegetables in the back yard to sell door to door. He was an excellent student, and avid hunter, having been quoted saying "from the time I was knee high to a grasshopper, (I had a rifle in my hands)."

=== Education ===
After graduating from Marysville High School in 1909, he enrolled at Ohio Wesleyan, and then Ohio State University for two years. While there he studied civil engineering, was active in Sigma Alpha Epsilon, trained as a cadet, and was manager of the basketball team. Following the two years at OSU, Beightler left to take employment as an assistant engineer with Union County.

=== Marriage ===
While he was in college, he met his future wife Anna Lawrence Porter, who was a student at Ohio Wesleyan University. Her father was an executive with the Chesapeake and Potomac Telephone Company, and her grandfather was a judge in Union County. They married on October 14, 1914, and had three children, two who lived, Robert Jr., and Marjorie. Beightler's best man at this wedding was John W. Bricker, the future governor of Ohio, U.S. Senator, and 1944 Republican vice presidential nominee.

== Early military service ==
On August 7, 1911, Beightler enlisted with the Ohio National Guard. Assigned to the 4th Ohio Infantry, he served with Company E, based out of an armory in Marysville. By 1913 Beightler had achieved the rank of first sergeant, and second lieutenant by 1914. In August 1916, President Woodrow Wilson mobilized 400,000 troops from across the nation, including from the Ohio National Guard, to be sent to the Mexican border to deal with the border crisis and Pancho Villa. The forces were led by John J. Pershing. The young Beightler served in this conflict.

On August 5, 1917, Beightler was commissioned as a first lieutenant in the U.S. Army, serving as an adjutant for the 3rd Battalion. The 4th infantry was designated the 166th U.S. Infantry Regiment by the U.S. War Department. He was moved to Camp Mills on Long Island in preparation for deployment to France in the European theater of World War I. Before departing for Europe in October 1917, Anne visited to wish Robert well and inform him that they were expecting their first child. Upon arriving in France, Beightler's regiment undertook basic training operations, including learning the French language. He was involved in the Sedan incident, as well as other combat during his time in France.

== Interwar years ==
Following the war, he returned home to Ohio in 1919. Re-entering civilian life, he worked as an engineer for the state in Columbus despite requests by his father to work in Union County as an engineer. His daughter was over a year old after he left the military, and the young family moved to Columbus to be closer to Beightler's employment.

Beightler completed his engineering degree at Ohio State University. He also started a private civil engineering firm with Adolph Stellhorn. He went on to Command and General Staff School in Leavenworth, Kansas, to complete a course on National Guard Officers where he was first in his class. In 1930, he graduated from the Army War College's G-2 course.

In 1932, Beightler returned to active duty, serving with the Army General Staff in Washington D.C. This exposed him to the highest levels of the Army, something rarely afforded to National Guard officers. He spent most of his time working on plans for the Interstate Highway System.

In 1936 he returned to Ohio, working as chief of staff for the 37th Infantry Division, and as commander of the 74th Infantry Brigade. In 1939 his longtime friend John W. Bricker, who had become Governor of Ohio, appointed Beightler to Ohio State Highway Director.

== World War II ==
=== Training the 37th Infantry Division ===
37th Infantry Division insignia

In 1940, Beightler was appointed commanding General of the 37th Infantry Division, and immediately began exhaustive training and preparation of his soldiers. His philosophy was simple, the better trained the soldiers are, the fewer casualties there would be. He also had moral reasoning, having been quoted after World War II saying "... I have never been able to completely harden myself to the sacrifice of American lives. I have always felt a deep-seated responsibility to the families of these men, many of whom might be called my neighbors."

The 37th participated in the Louisiana Maneuvers, in which future senior military leaders Dwight Eisenhower, George Patton, Omar Bradley, and Leslie McNair were present. McNair said of Beightler that he was "one of the best" National Guard commanders. A few months later, America was thrown into World War II following the Pearl Harbor attacks.

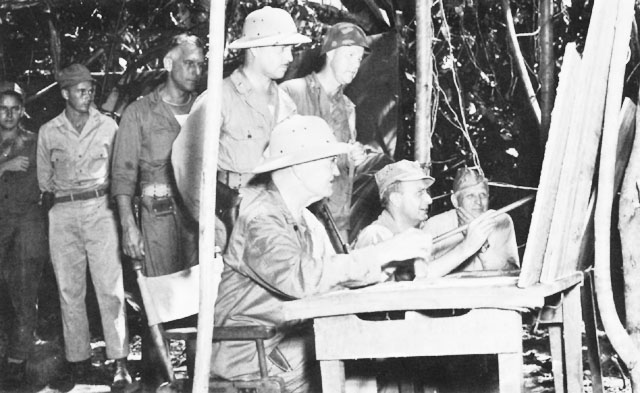
Beightler, seated in the center, in Bougainville in 1943

Following the training of the 37th, Beightler led them into battle in the Pacific theater of the war. The "Buckeye Division," as the 37th was called, entered the theater in 1942. The 37th were victorious in numerous battles, including victories at New Georgia, Bougainville, the Battle of Manila, and raced the 33rd Division to liberate Baguio City. They would go on to liberate 1300 internees at the Bilibid Prison in Muntinlupa.

On September 5, 1945, Beightler accepted articles of surrender from Major General Iguchi, commanding general, 80th Brigade, Imperial Japanese Army, in Luzon, Philippines.

The Buckeye Division produced 7 Medal of Honor recipients during the war. The division was demobilized in November 1945.

=== Postwar service ===
In addition to being the Army's longest-serving division commander in 1945, Beightler received an appointment in the Regular Army in 1946, one of only two National Guard major generals to receive such an appointment at that time. Following the war, Beightler was assigned to the 5th Service Command at Fort Hayes in Columbus. In 1947, he was appointed president of the personnel board of the Secretary of War, moving back to Washington. In 1949, he was assigned to the Far East, taking over the Marianas-Bonins Command on Guam.

In 1950, he was appointed the Deputy Military Governor of Okinawa, as well as the Deputy Governor of the Ryukyus Islands Command. During this period he dedicated most of his time toward rebuilding the infrastructure of the Ryukyu Islands. Following a massive heart attack in 1952, one of nine Beightler suffered throughout his life, he was flown to Walter Reed Medical Center in Washington D.C.; in 1953, he retired from the military after 42 years of service.

== Politics ==
Beightler had been involved in politics since his return from World War I. He was a lifelong critic of too much federal power, and constantly feuded with Washington in defending the National Guard. He was a staunch conservative in the classical liberal sense, believing in the freedom of the States and skeptical of the federal government.

He was active in the Ohio Republican Party, having been a longtime friend of John W. Bricker, and close friends of Ohio Republican leader Ed Schorr and U.S. Senate Majority Leader and presidential son Robert A. Taft. He had extensive media contacts that he used to the 37th's advantage in a dispute with the War Department in Washington, as well as to keep up on the political environment personally. At one point he was the mayor of Marble Cliff, Ohio, a tiny hamlet just outside downtown Columbus. He resigned in 1932 after being activated to work on the Interstate Highway System for the U.S. Military. He was an alternate delegate from the Ohio delegation to the 1940 Republican National Convention.

=== Gubernatorial and congressional consideration ===
In the spring of 1945 the Ohio Republican Party attempted to draft Beightler to run for governor against Frank Lausche in 1946. His candidacy was urged by Bricker, and Ohio Congressman Clarence J. Brown. They would have provided early key endorsements. Hundreds of insider Republicans wrote to Beightler offering their support, they believed that he could easily clinch the Republican nomination for governor, and could defeat Lausche.

However, citing the lack of a completely unified party around his potential candidacy, he did not want to cause a factional split in the party. He also cited the unlikelihood that he could beat Lausche who was a great campaigner, as well as the fact that he agreed with Lausche on almost every issue. His decision was also influenced by the fact he was still engaged in battle in the Pacific theater.

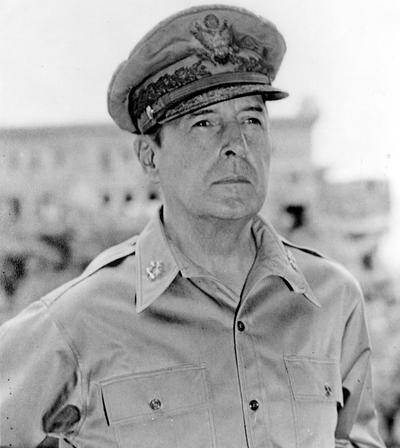
Gen. Douglas MacArthur was encouraged by Beightler in a personal meeting in 1950 to run for U.S. president in 1952

He did write that ending his public career as governor of "the grand old state of Ohio" was an appealing prospect. Beightler miscalculated the political atmosphere, as Lausche lost by 40,000 votes the following year in a banner year for Republicans.

In 1946, talks circulated again of Beightler running for political office, this time for Congress. However, he said was not interested in a legislative position and called it "a nobody's job."

=== Opposition to Eisenhower candidacy ===
On November 9, 1950, while stationed in the Pacific, he sent a letter to Robert A. Taft congratulating him on his Senate re-election victory. The letter discussed a personal meeting with Gen. Douglas MacArthur on the subject, in which Beightler had encouraged MacArthur to run in 1952, but MacArthur showed no interest. MacArthur shared the same views as Beightler on Eisenhower, and both went on to endorse Taft in 1952. In Taft's reply on November 24, 1950, he implied to Beightler that Eisenhower was incompetent and likely to be influenced by money and political endorsements.

=== Ohio Turnpike Commission ===
After leaving the military in 1953, Beightler headed the Ohio Turnpike Commission as executive director. He oversaw the construction and completion of the Ohio Turnpike. He resigned as executive director to become a member of the commission.

== Retirement and family ==
Beightler retired in 1962 to Worthington, Ohio. Over the years he had been a good investor, and had a large retirement savings. He enjoyed gardening and fishing, and spent his winters in Florida. He followed national and international affairs closely, as well as Wall Street out of interest of his own financial holdings. He was also active in veterans and civic groups.

Beightler had two children with Anne, Robert Jr., who attended the United States Military Academy at West Point, and Marjorie. Robert Jr. served in the Philippines during World War II as a platoon leader in the 511th Parachute Infantry Regiment of the 11th Airborne Division. Despite both father and son fighting in their respective divisions in the Battle of Manila, the two did not meet in a combat area until April in northern Luzon.

Beightler died on February 12, 1978. He is buried at Oakdale Cemetery in Marysville.

Beightler had said of his hometown "With you, I lived many of my greatest moments, from which I have many of my fondest memories. Memories of Marysville during my 28 years here are among my warmest thoughts."

== Honors ==
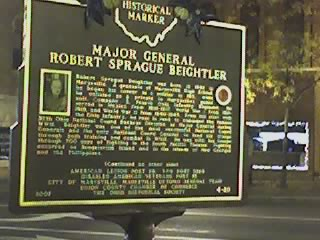
Beightler's Historical Marker at 5th Street and Main, Marysville, Ohio

Robert Beightler was the recipient of numerous honors, including the Distinguished Service Cross for his leadership in the Philippines campaign, the Silver Star Medal, the Purple Heart, the Combat Infantryman Badge, the Distinguished Service Medal for the New Georgia campaign, with an oak leaf cluster for his service in Bougainville and Luzon, and the Legion of Merit with an oak leaf cluster. His award of the Combat Infantryman Badge was later revoked because Army regulations prohibit the badge from being awarded to generals.

On September 25, 1945, Beightler received his 33d degree from the Scottish Rite of Freemasonry. He was awarded the Legion of Honor from the Philippine government. In June 1952, Beightler was awarded an honorary doctorate from the University of the Ryukyus for his work in rebuilding the infrastructure. The National Guard armory in Columbus is named in his honor. It is the headquarters of the Ohio National Guard.

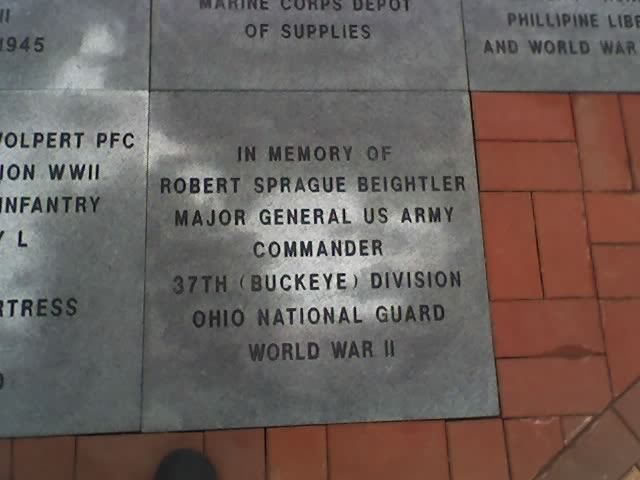
Beightler's marker at the Veterans Memorial in Marysville, Ohio

In 1969, the city of Marysville, Ohio dedicated 5th Street in honor of Beightler, naming it Major General Robert S. Beightler Way. In 1993, the Ohio Department of Veterans Affairs inducted him into the Ohio Veterans Hall of Fame. In 2007, the Union County, Ohio Chamber of Commerce declared September 28 to be Major General Robert S. Beightler Day.

In 2007, the Ohio Historical Society dedicated an historical marker on 5th Street in Uptown Marysville in honor of Beightler. Hundreds of citizens attended the ceremony, with officials present from the office of Gov. Ted Strickland, U.S. Senator George Voinovich, and the Ohio National Guard. In 2007, the American Legion Department of Ohio funded his memorial marker at the Veterans Memorial in Marysville, Ohio.

=== Military decorations ===

| 1 | Combat Infantryman Badge | | |
| 2 | Distinguished Service Cross | | Distinguished Service Medal with Oak Leaf Cluster |
| 3 | Legion of Merit with Oak Leaf Cluster | Silver Star | Bronze Star with Oak Leaf Cluster |
| 4 | Purple Heart | Mexican Border Service Medal | World War I Victory Medal with five battle clasps |
| 5 | Army of Occupation of Germany Medal | American Defense Service Medal | American Campaign Medal |
| 6 | Asiatic-Pacific Campaign Medal with four campaign stars | World War II Victory Medal | Philippine Liberation Medal with one bronze award star |

== Notes ==
Military offices
| Preceded by Newly activated organization | Commanding General 37th Infantry Division; 1940–1945 | Succeeded by Post deactivated |
