= Quarry Trails Metro Park =

Park and nature preserve in Central Ohio, U.S.

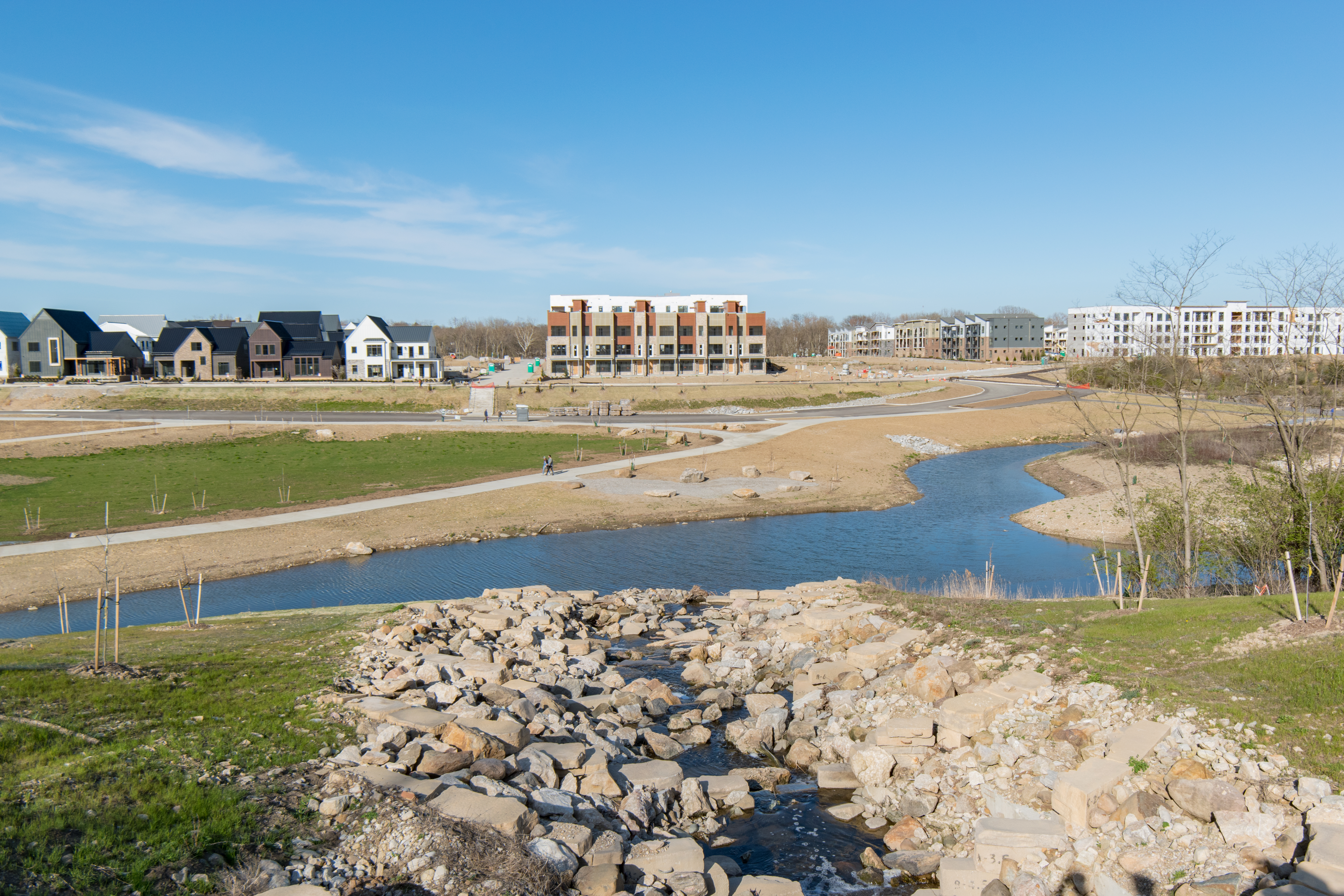
- Interactive map of Quarry Trails Metro Park
- Type: Metro park
- Location: 2600 Dublin Road, Columbus, Ohio
- Coordinates: 40.0030°N 83.0910°W
- Area: 220 acres (89 ha)
- Administrator: Columbus and Franklin County Metro Parks
- Open: Year-round
- Parking: Multiple lots
- Website: Official website

Quarry Trails Metro Park is a 220-acre (89 ha) metropolitan park in Columbus, Ohio, owned and operated by Columbus and Franklin County Metro Parks. The park opened on November 30, 2021, as Central Ohio's 20th metro park. Portions of the park remained under construction, although 200 acres opened, including a 25-foot waterfall, trails, boardwalks, and a zipline.

The park still borders active portions of the Marble Cliff Quarry; other portions were sold for housing and mixed-use developments. Marble Cliff was formerly the largest quarry in the United States, the source for limestone used in the Ohio Statehouse and Ohio Stadium, and was the workplace for many Italian immigrants who settled in the surrounding area.

Around March 2022, construction of a rock-climbing wall began at the park, to be 160 feet tall and about 1/2-mile wide, utilizing stones leftover from the quarry site. Designed by Via Ferrata Works, it will be the first urban via ferrata in the United States. The attraction opened in May 2023.

== See also ==
- List of parks in Columbus, Ohio
