= San Margherita, Ohio =

San Margherita, OH
- Neighborhood in Columbus
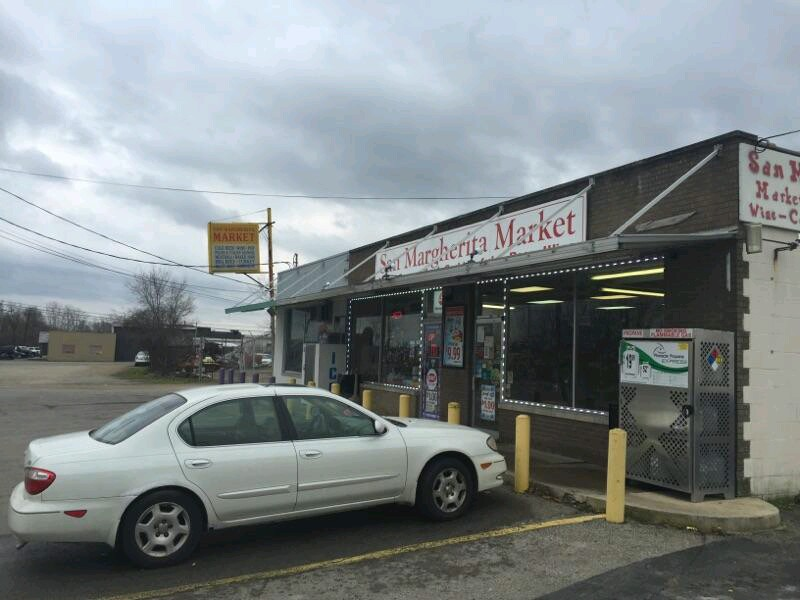
- Interactive map of the neighborhood
- Coordinates: 39°59′38″N 83°05′13″W
- Country: United States
- State: Ohio
- County: Franklin
- City: Columbus
- Zip Code: 43204
- Area code: 614

San Margherita is an unincorporated neighborhood directly west of Columbus, Ohio, half falling into Norwich Township and the other half in Franklin Township. The area was settled in the early 20th century by Italian immigrants working for the Marble Cliff Quarry Company. Though once a robust and rural community, San Margherita is in danger of vanishing. Many of the original homes and locally owned businesses in the neighborhood have been demolished.

== History ==
San Margherita is located west of Columbus, across the Scioto River. Between 1880 and 1920, the area was populated by Italian immigrants who worked in the nearby Marble Cliff Quarry. The majority of the immigrants came from the commune of Pettorano sul Gizio in the Province of L'Aquila in the Abruzzo region of Italy, where the patron Saint Margaret of Cortona became the hamlet's namesake. Originally, the quarry provided workers with shack-like homes placed along McKinley Avenue and the railroad tracks. Quarry workers who amounted enough wealth moved on to construct homes along the south side of Trabue Road.

At its founding, the area was not connected to Columbus by train. As such, residents of the neighborhood kept livestock and grew some of their own produce. The community was bound together by mutual language and customs, shared work and problems, and by deep family friendships. The isolation prompted members of the neighborhood to drive for a church of their own in 1921. Thirteen local families each pledged $50 and received a land donation to begin construction. The original Saint Margaret of Cortona Church was constructed at 3388 Trabue Road. In 1936, the parish hall was built, and in 1955 the rectory finished construction. An increase in the size of the congregation prompted a need for a new church. In 1968, the new church by the same name was constructed at 1600 Hague Avenue.

Twenty-eight pre-World War II homes were constructed along Trabue Rd, and post-War homes were constructed a few blocks south on Hague Avenue until the site of the new Saint Margaret of Cortona Church. Since then, the neighborhood has been in decline, with many descendants of the original residents moving to nearby neighborhoods like Grandview Heights or Marble Cliff Village. In 2003, the City of Columbus acquired three homes and three commercial properties, including a Marathon gas station and Spiro's Lounge, for demolition to widen the road and ease traffic on Trabue Road between Dublin Road and McKinley Avenue.

In 2008, The Robert Weiler Company acquired a 10-acre tract of land at 3445 Trabue Rd. In an article by The Columbus Dispatch, company president, Skip Weiler, stated that the company had been amassing property in San Margherita for commercial development and was looking to develop a supermarket-anchored center along Trabue Rd. to serve both Upper Arlington and the West Side.

In 2017, Wagenbrenner Development purchased a portion of the 607-acre Marble Cliff Quarry, with the intention of remediating the site's brownfields to create a mixed-use development and a new Columbus Metro Park. In 2021, the first phase of the park opened to the public.

== Geography ==
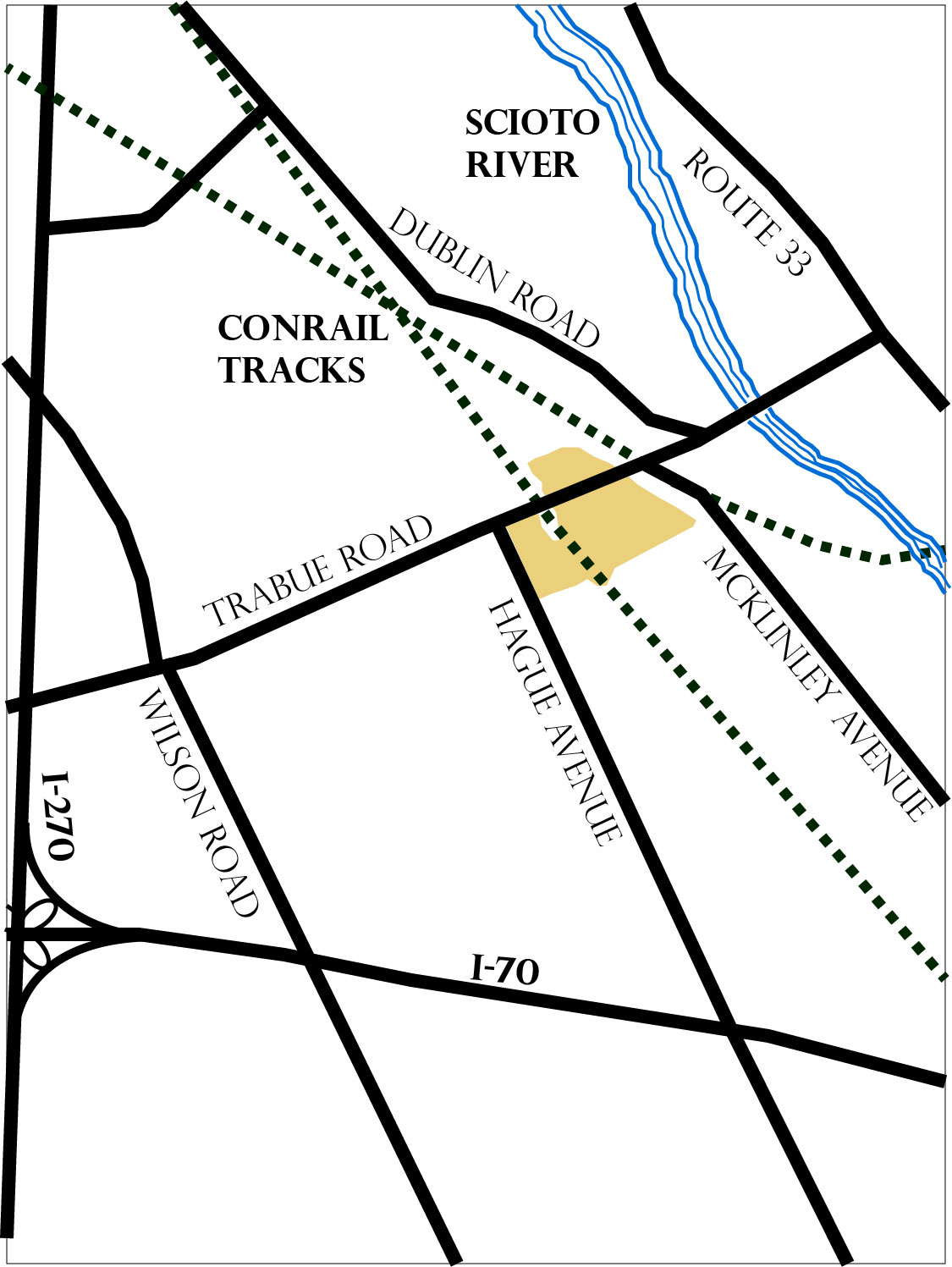
The boundaries of San Margherita are shown in yellow, located between Hague and McKinley Avenues along Trabue Rd

Neighborhood boundaries between Penn Central’s (now Norfolk Southern) Buckeye Line and Conrail’s (now CSX) Scotslawn Secondary tracks, following Trabue Road and venturing south until 1600 Hague Avenue. The Saint Margaret of Cortona Catholic Church parish boundaries extend north to Roberts Road, east to the Scioto River, south to Fisher Road, and west to Jones Road.

== Landmarks and structures ==
=== Saint Margaret of Cortona Catholic Church ===
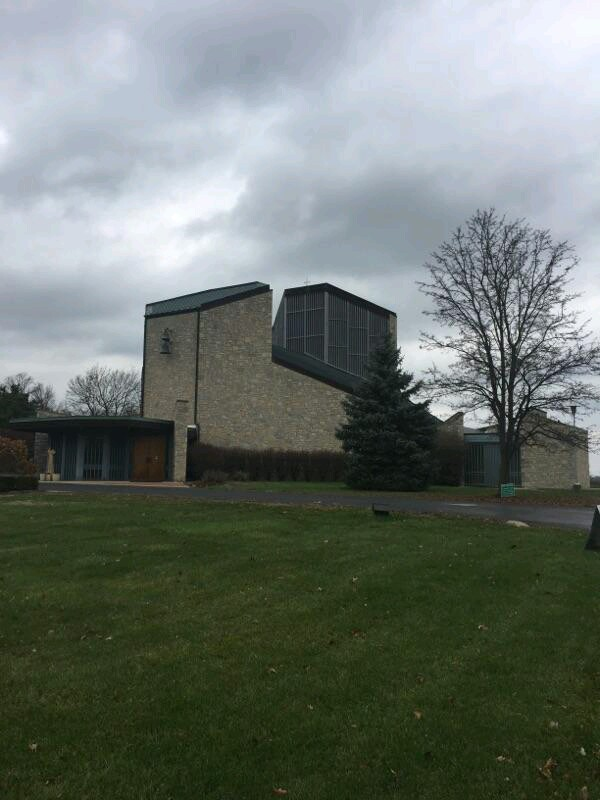
The current Saint Margaret of Cortona Church building

Originally located at 3388 Trabue Road. Thirteen local families spearheaded the drive for a local church in the predominantly Roman Catholic community. These families each donated $50 towards construction of the church, while another local family donated the 2.2-acre lot for the church. In 1921, the church was built, within 5 years of the finished construction date, the church was debt free. The frame parish hall was constructed in 1936, and the rectory was finished in 1955. Beginning in 1921, the parish held an annual 3-day festival in late July to honor the patron saints of the residents' birthplaces in Italy, including a parade down Trabue Rd. carrying statues of St. Margaret, St. Anne, St. Lucy, St. Anthony, and St. Joseph. By the 1950s the parish's boundaries were set stretching east until the Scioto River, west to Jones Road, north to Roberts Road, and south to Fisher Road.

A growing congregation created the need for a larger church. The new Saint Margaret of Cortona was built in 1968, located on 1600 Hague Avenue. In 1987, St. Margaret of Cortona Church at 3388 Trabue Rd. was sold and scheduled for demolition due to disrepair and low attendance for daily mass. The Church was sold to Joseph Baljak, a parish member since 1976, under the agreement that Baljak could repurpose the rectory and parish hall, but the church be demolished. Until the old St. Margaret's church was destroyed, daily mass was held at 3388 Trabue Rd. church and Sunday mass and religious ceremonies were held at the 1600 Hague Ave. church. The annual festival was moved to the Hague Ave. church, but the parade evolved to include a procession from the old church to the new one.

Saint Margaret of Cortona Catholic Church currently serves 600 families. Father Jeff Rimelspach is the current pastor, with Deacon Andy Naporano serving as the presiding deacon.

=== Johnnie's Tavern ===
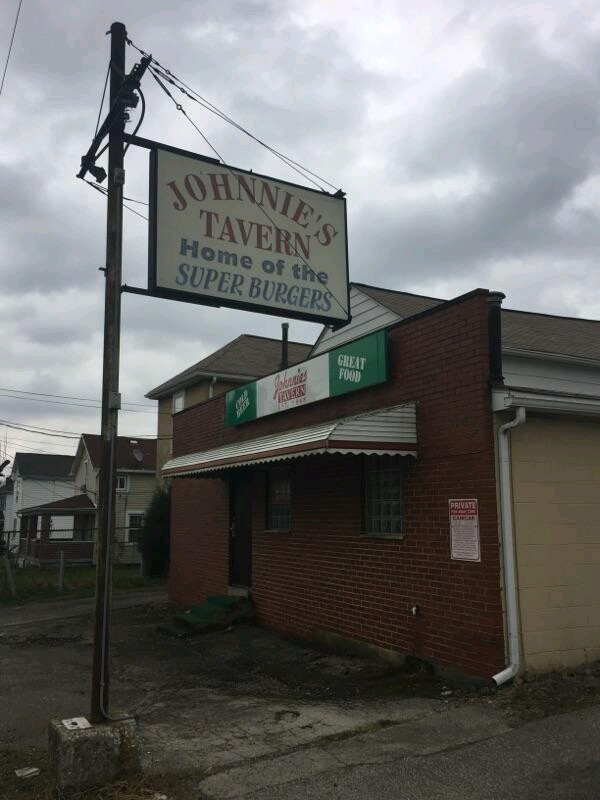
Johnnies Tavern on Trabue Rd. San Maghertia, Ohio

Located on 3503 Trabue Rd. Johnnie's Tavern is a "blink and you'll miss it" bar specializing in serving burgers and sandwiches six days a week from 11am to 10pm, Monday through Saturday. The tavern was founded by Dominic "Johnnie" Lombardi, the son of one of the founding members of San Margherita, in 1946. The restaurant features a limited menu and beers on draft.

=== Marble Cliff Quarry ===
Quarrying activity began as early as 1851, but became more extensive in 1892 with the arrival of Sylvio A. Casparis. Casparis Stone Co. merged with three other companies to for Marble Cliff Quarries, which at one point employed as many as 500 men. Sections of the original quarry remain in operation, now by American Aggregates Co. The remainder of the quarry has since been filled in and developed for residential use, including Marble Cliff Commons apartments and Marble Cliff Crossing, a 100 single-family and 60 double-family subdivision built between 1998 and 2003.

In 2017, Thrive Companies, formerally Wagenbrenner, purchased the quarry's 600-acre site, of which 220 acres were turned into a Columbus Metro Park, and a development featuring apartments, townhomes, condominiums, and retail. On November 30, 2021, the first phase of the 225-acre Quarry Trails Metro Park opened to the public.

== Residential ==
The homes along Trabue Road sit on the 60 ft fronts of one acre lots. The large backyards were used to grow vegetables and cultivate grapes in small vineyards. Early residents of the neighborhood would tend to chickens and hogs, providing help to their neighbors during slaughter and harvest times. Two dozen of the original homes still remain on Trabue Road.

== Gallery ==
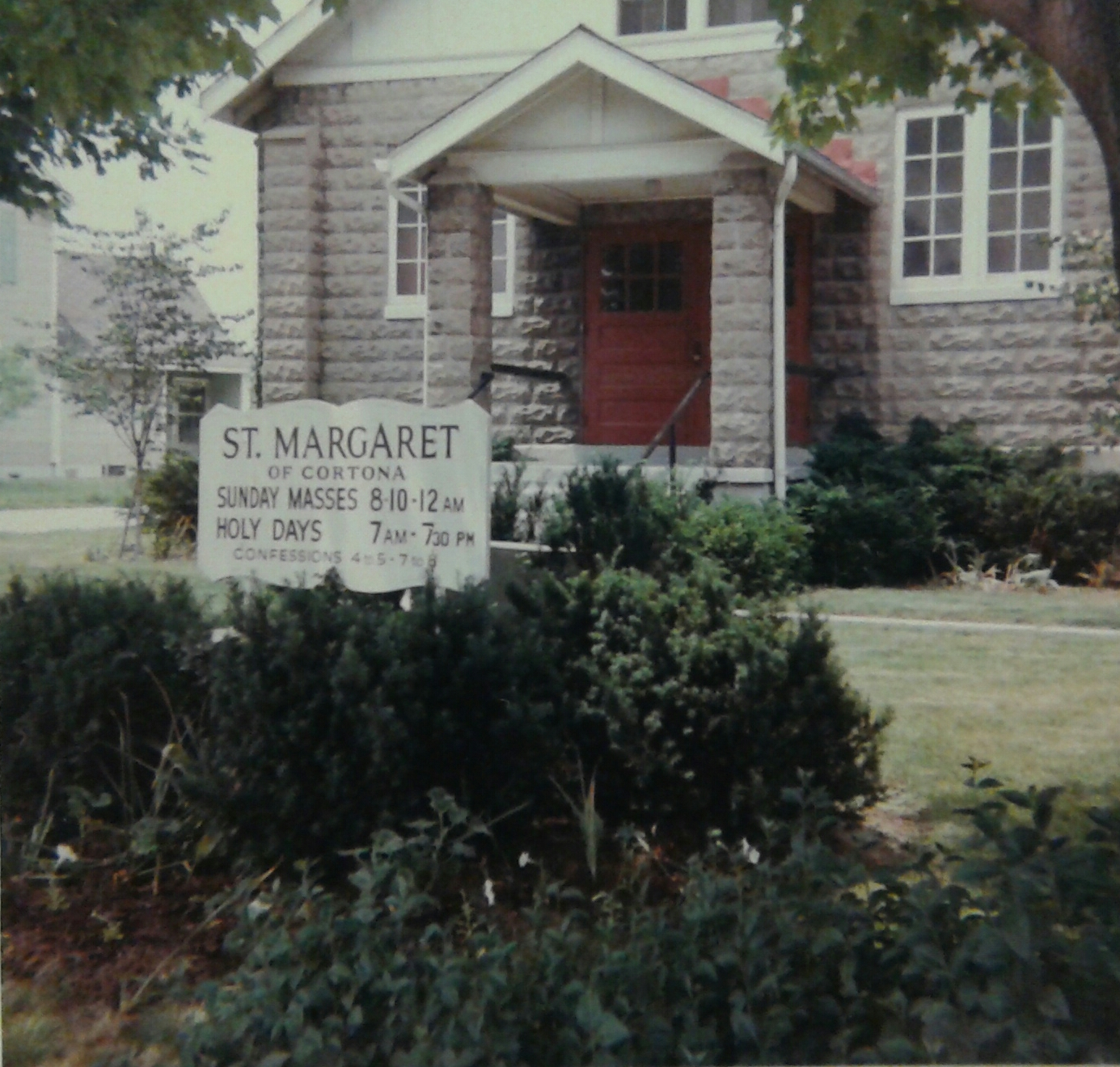
The original Saint Margaret of Cortona Catholic Church, viewed from the front on 3388 Trabue Rd

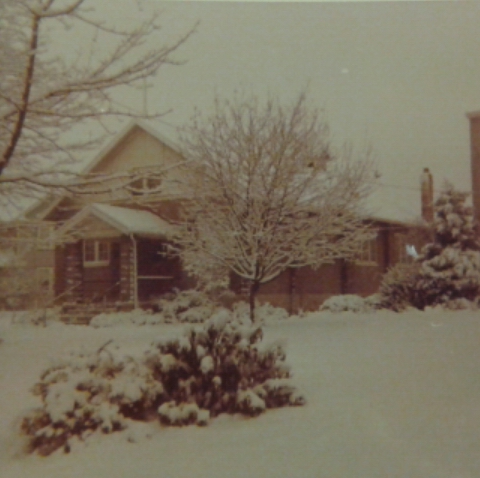
The original St. Margaret of Cortona Catholic Church in the winter of 1968

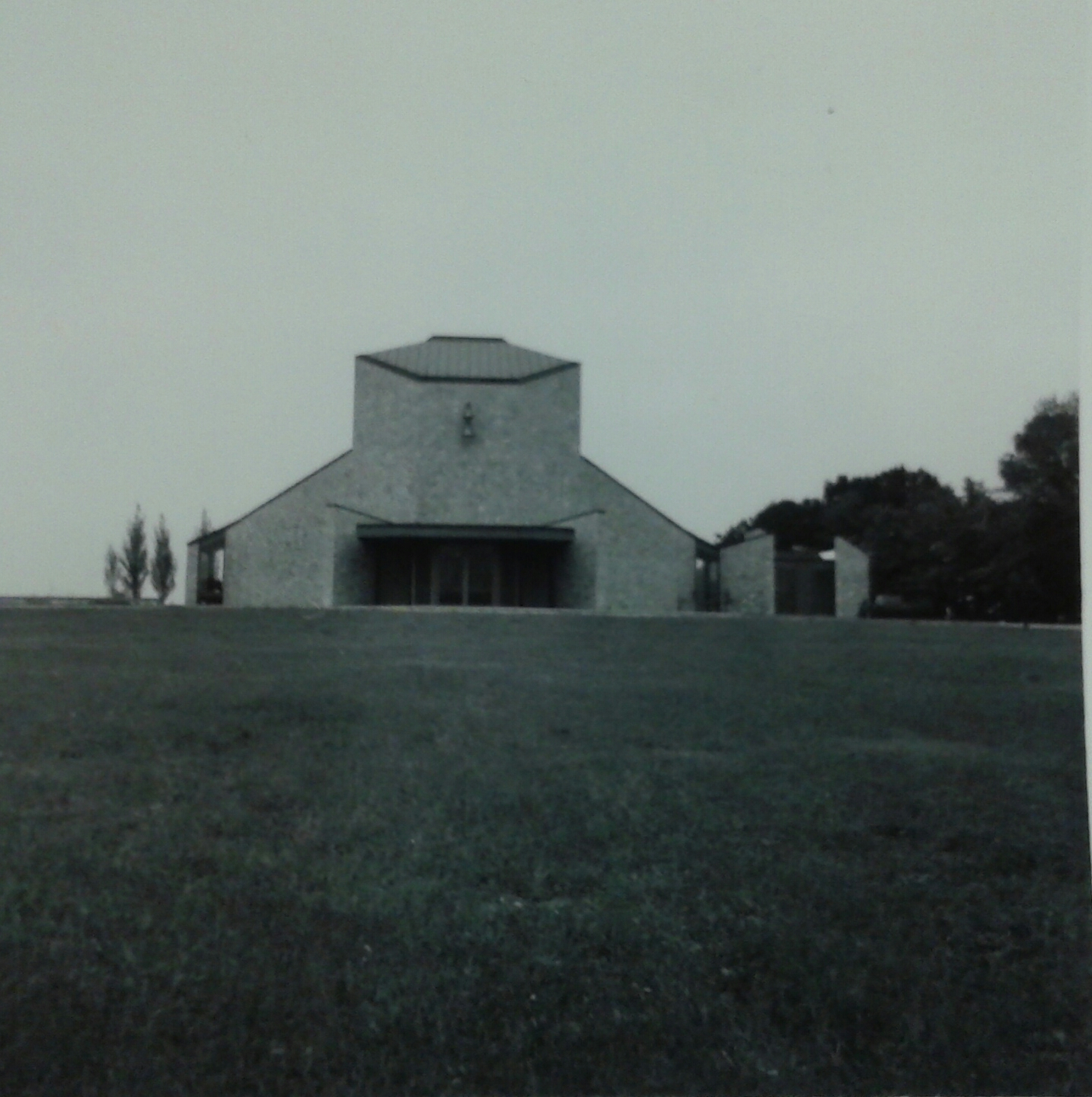
The new St. Margaret of Cortona Church, viewed from its front at 1600 Hague Ave

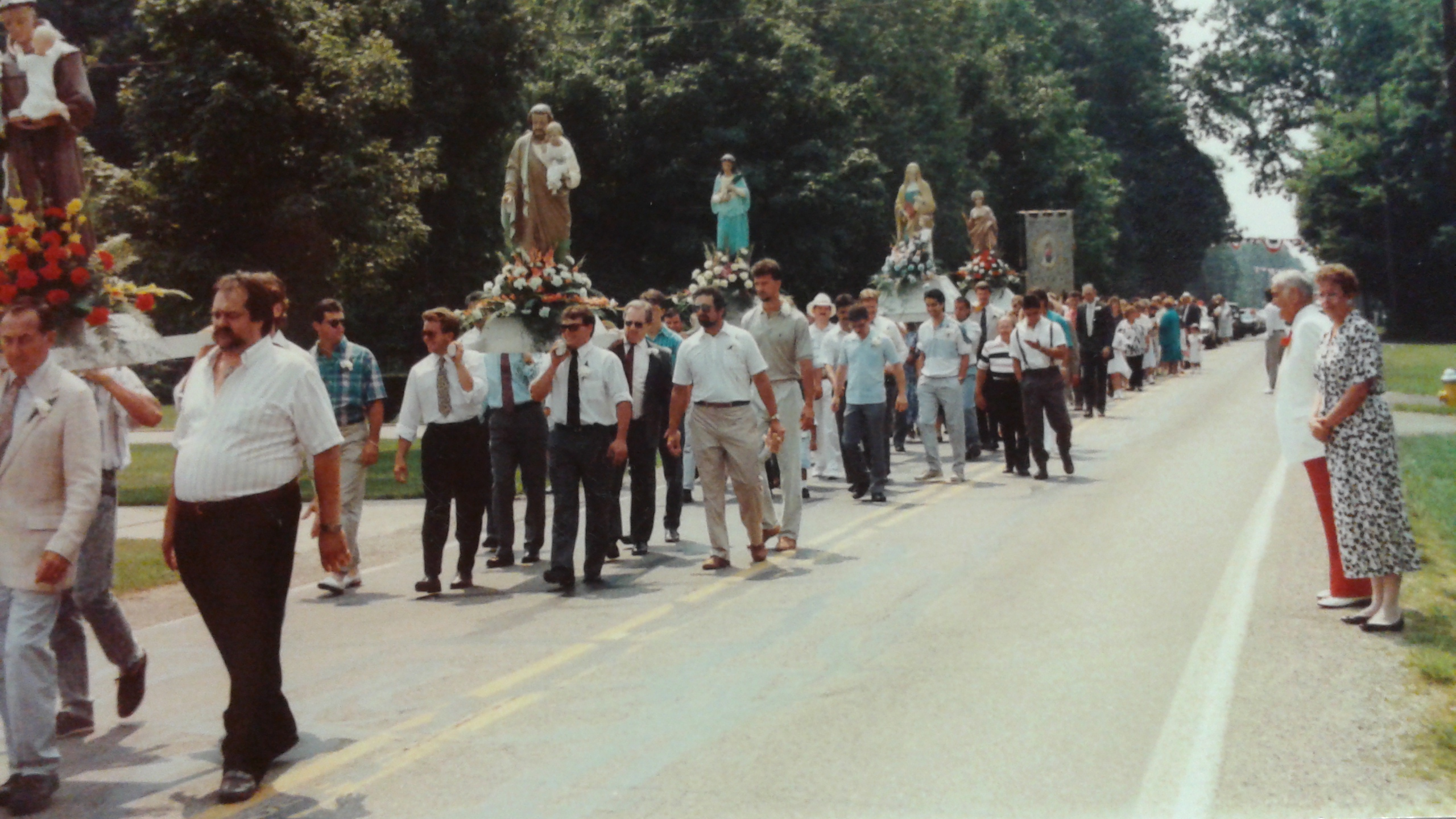
St. Margaret's festival was held even before the construction of the original church, and has always included a procession down Trabue Rd, carrying statues of Italian patron saints

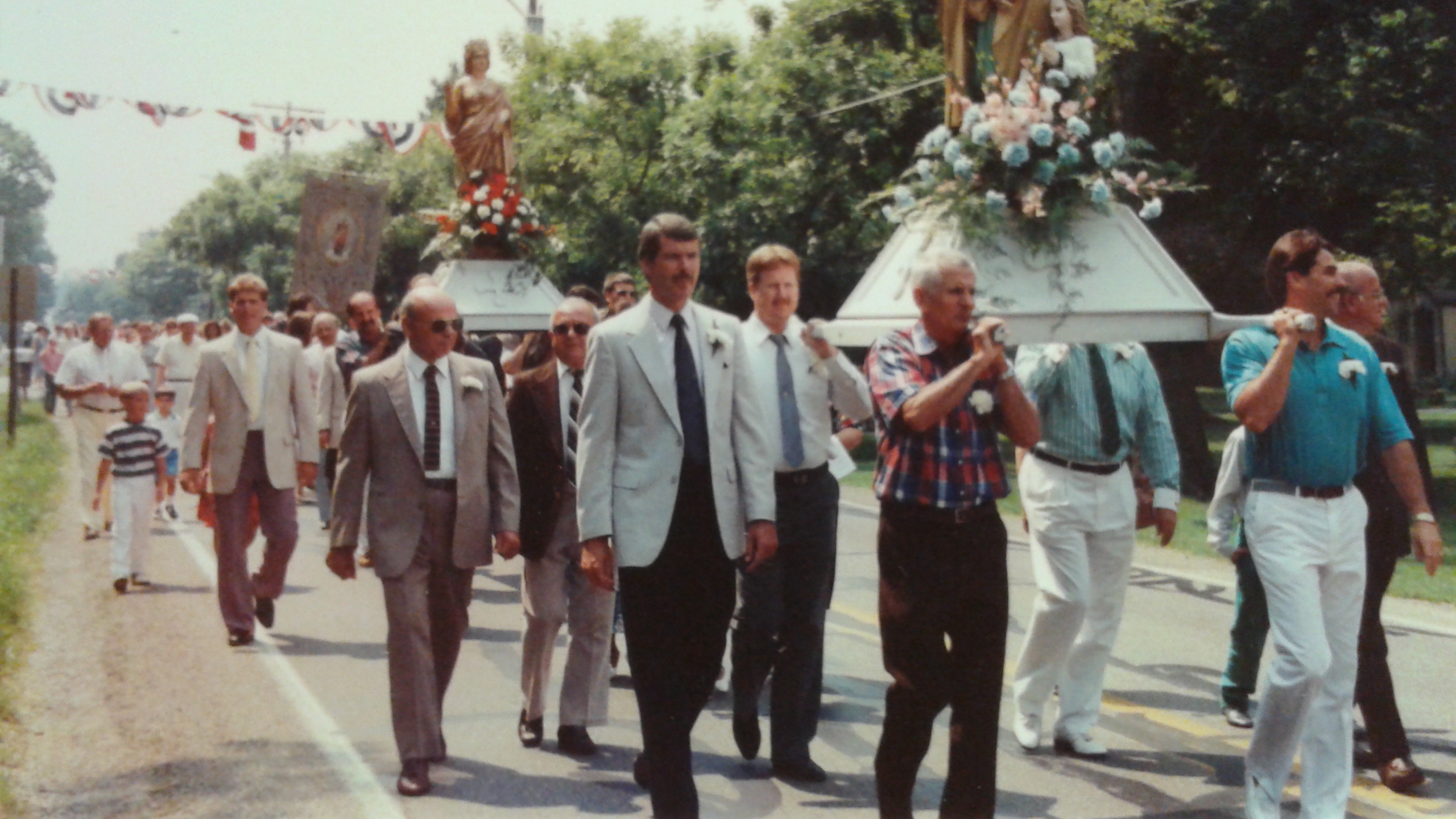
Saint Margaret of Cortona parish festival procession from the Trabue Rd church to the Hague Ave site

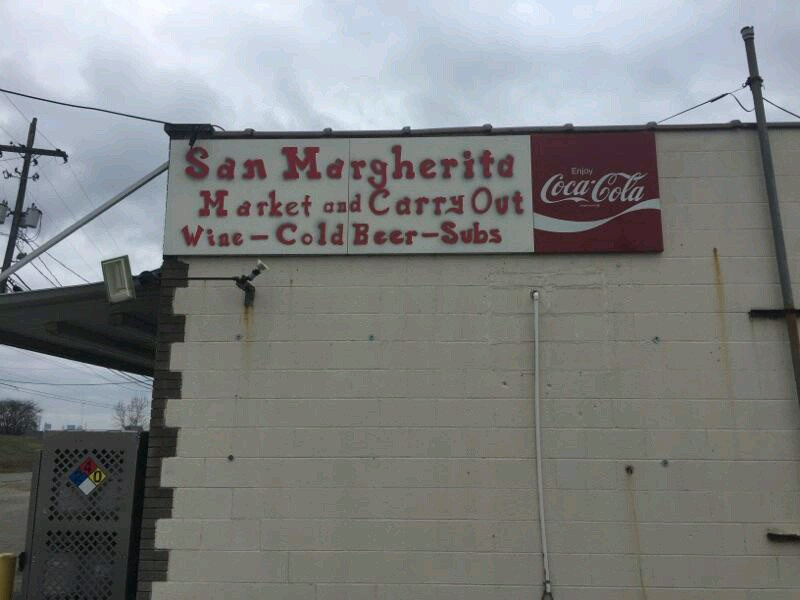
The San Margherita Market
