= Bigler (surname) =

Bigler is a surname. Notable people with the surname include:

- Erin Bigler (b.1949), American neuropsychologist
- Gabriella Bigler (born 2008), American pararower
- Heinz Bigler (1925–2002), Swiss football midfielder and manager
- Heinz Bigler (1949–2021), Swiss football defender and manager
- Ivan Bigler (1892–1975), American baseball player
- John Bigler (1805–1871), California governor
- Chris Bigler (b.1949), Swiss poker player
- Kevin Bigler (b.1992), Swiss footballer
- Milo Bigler (1914–1989), Swiss Olympic skeleton racer
- William Bigler (1814–1880), Pennsylvania governor and United States Senator
- Samuel Bigler (1947–2025), American Olympic weightlifter
- Bathsheba Bigler (1822–1910), American suffrage leader
- Alfred Bigler (1898–1944), German SS Oberführer
- Brad Bigler (b.1979), American College Basketball Coach
- Tom Bigler (1921–2007), American journalist
- Donald G. Bigler (1932–2023), American engineer and businessman, designer of Voyager program spacecraft, Smithsonian honoree
- Dave Bigler, American football
- Ben Bigler, American dancer
- Virginia Bigler (1948–2018), American meteorologist
- Hans-Ulrich Bigler (b.1948), Swiss politician
- Rolf Bigler (1930–1978), Swiss journalist, husband of Christiane Hörbiger
- Rebecca Bigler, American psychologist
- Eduard Bigler (1868–1944), Argentina diplomat, died in Bergen-Belsen
- Nickolay Bigler (1907–1967), Soviet Chairman of the Jewish Autonomous Oblast
- Warren Bigler (1851–1930), Indiana State Auditor
- Emil Bigler (b.1988), Danish hockey player
- Poul Bigler (1877–1931), Danish Ambassador to Austria
- Gene E. Bigler (b.1946), American diplomat
- Dwight Bigler (b.1973), American composer, The American Prize winner
- Patrick Bigler (b.1988), Swiss climate scientist, Swiss National Science Foundation researcher
- Philip Bigler (b.1952), American historian, National Teacher of the Year winner

== See also ==
- Bigler (disambiguation)
