= Robert S. Beightler Jr. =

- Born: January 12, 1922; Marysville, Ohio, U.S.
- Died: February 6, 2003; Alamo, California, U.S.
- Burial place: West Point Post Cemetery, West Point, NY
- Spouses: Helen, Marilyn
- Relatives: son of Maj. Gen. Robert S. Beightler
- Military career
- Allegiance: United States
- Branch: United States Army
- Rank: Colonel

Col. Robert S. Beightler Jr. (January 12, 1922 - February 6, 2003) was an American military officer, who served as an aide to United States President Harry Truman.

== Early life and education ==
Beightler was born in Marysville, Ohio in 1922, the son of Maj. Gen. Robert S. Beightler and Anna Porter. He was the Valedictorian of his class at the Greenbrier Military School of Lewisburg, West Virginia and was appointed to the Honor Military School at the United States Military Academy, where he graduated in 1943. While at West Point, he was part of the USMA's National Championship rifle team.

== Career ==
During World War II, he served as a Lieutenant and Captain in the 511th Parachute Infantry Regiment during engagements in the Philippines and New Guinea. He was awarded the Bronze Star plus two clusters, as well as the Combat Infantryman Badge.

Beightler would serve on the Army General Staff in Washington D.C., spending two years as an aide to President Harry Truman. He returned to Ohio, where he earned an MBA from the Ohio State University in 1950. After a deployment with U.S. Forces to Austria, he returned to Washington to serve in The Pentagon as Chief of Enlisted Procurement. In 1958, he graduated from the Command and General Staff College in Fort Leavenworth, Kansas, and would go on to serve as Chief Organization and Training Advisor to the Korean Army, Treasurer of the United States Military Academy at West Point, and Commander of the 3rd Civil Affairs Group stationed in the Panama Canal Zone.

With the 3rd Civil Affairs Group, he traveled to Peru following a devastating earthquake in 1970 to lead the American Relief Expedition. His effective actions earned him the Peruvian Cross from President Juan Velasco Alvarado and the U.S. awarded him the Legion of Merit. He would retire in 1973 after serving as President of the Military Physical Education Evaluation Board at the Presidio in San Francisco, earning his second Legion of Merit.

In his post-military life, he would earn a varsity letter in tennis at Merritt College in Oakland at the age of 54, where he was continuing his education. He would go onto manage his family business and was active in athletics and community affairs.

== Death and legacy ==
After living in the Oakland Hills of California following military retirement, he died on February 6, 2003 in Alamo, California where he finally resided, at the age of 81. He was married twice, and had four children. He is buried in the West Point Post Cemetery, West Point, New York.
