= Marble Cliff Quarry Co. =

Limestone quarry company

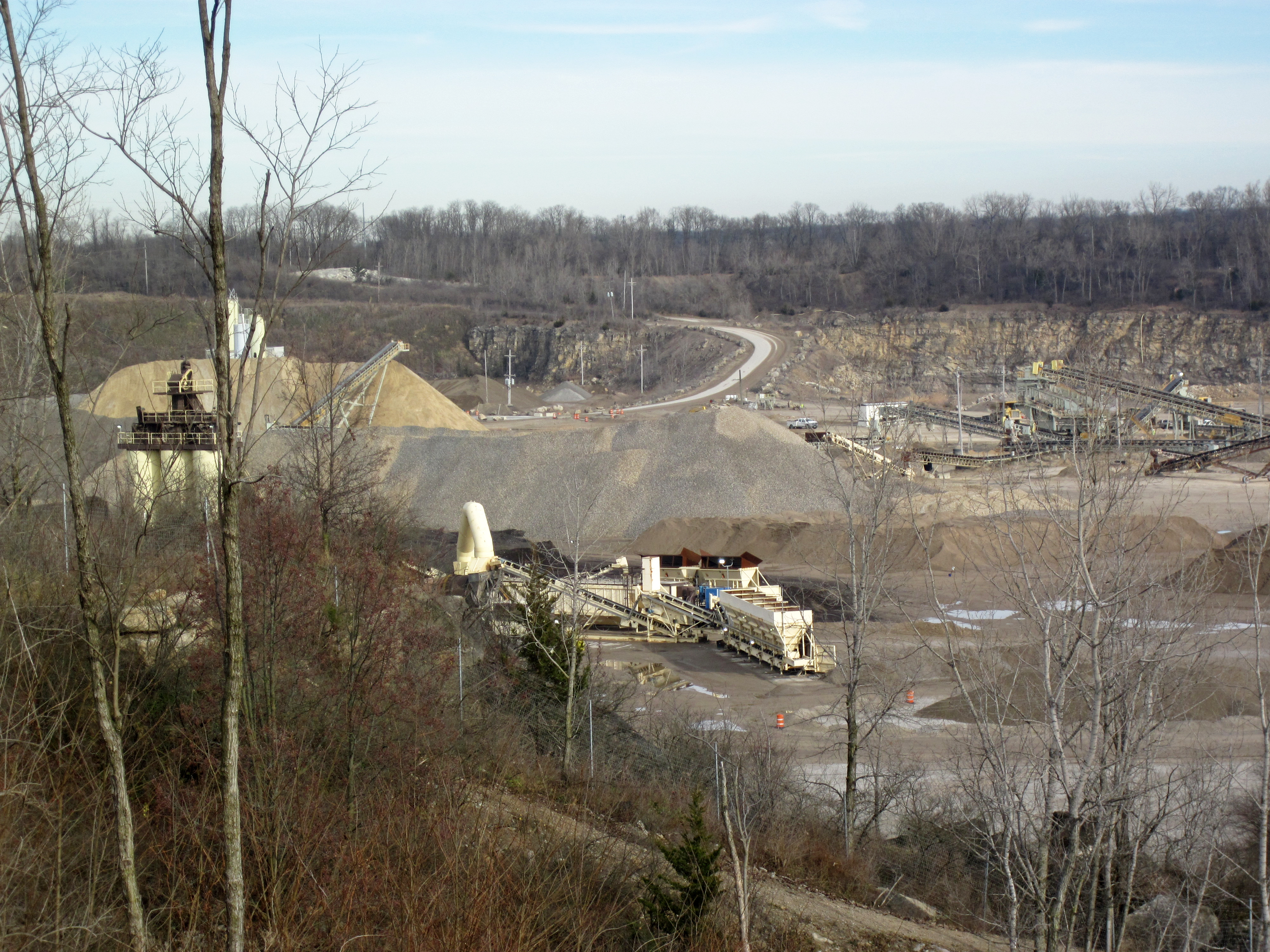
Operational section of Marblecliff Quarry in 2021

The Marble Cliff Quarry Co., is located in the community of San Margherita and operated the largest limestone quarry in the United States from its founding in 1913 until its sale in 1985.

== History ==
In the early 1840s, quarry activities began in the area to mine a narrow belt of Columbus and Delaware limestone which stretched all the way from the Scioto River to the Olentangy River adjacent to Marble Cliff, Ohio. The Columbus formation stone was roughly 100 feet thick with the Delaware limestone deposit above at 16 to 35 feet thick. Limestone was mined through the simple process of drilling and blasting and resulted in either blocks or crushed stone of various sizes. The products were then sent to the nearby limestone markets where they were sold and used in construction or as flux to purify iron ore. These activities became more extensive in 1892 with the arrival of Sylvio A. Casparis and the Casparis Stone Co.

In 1913, Marble Cliff Quarries Co. was founded and shortly consolidated quarrying activities with the merger of Casparis Stone, Scioto Stone, Kiefer Stone, and Woodruff and Pausch Stone. John W. Kaufman was named president of the company and H.J. Kaufman vice president. The company grew through the expansion of stone grades from one to six and market-specific divisions that cater their products to specific industries, and at one point employed as many as 500 men. By 1928, Marble Cliff Quarry was producing 3 million tons of stone per year, and purchased land in Muskingum County to expand their operations in road material.

== Development ==
In 1985, the Kaufmans sold the 2,000-acre (8.1 km^{2}) quarry to investors who filled in and developed the quarry for residential use, including Marble Cliff Commons apartments and Marble Cliff Crossing, a 100 single-family and 60 double-family subdivision built between 1998 and 2003. The northern section of the original quarry remained in operation by American Aggregates Co.

In 2017, Wagenbrenner Development purchased a 560-acre (230 ha) section of the former quarry, with the intention of remediating the site's brownfields to create a mixed-use development and the region's 20th Metro Park. On November 30, 2021, the first phase of the 225-acre Quarry Trails Metro Park opened to the public.
