= Inniswood Metro Gardens =

Botanical garden and nature preserve in Westerville, Ohio

Coordinates: 40°07′25″N 82°55′17″W

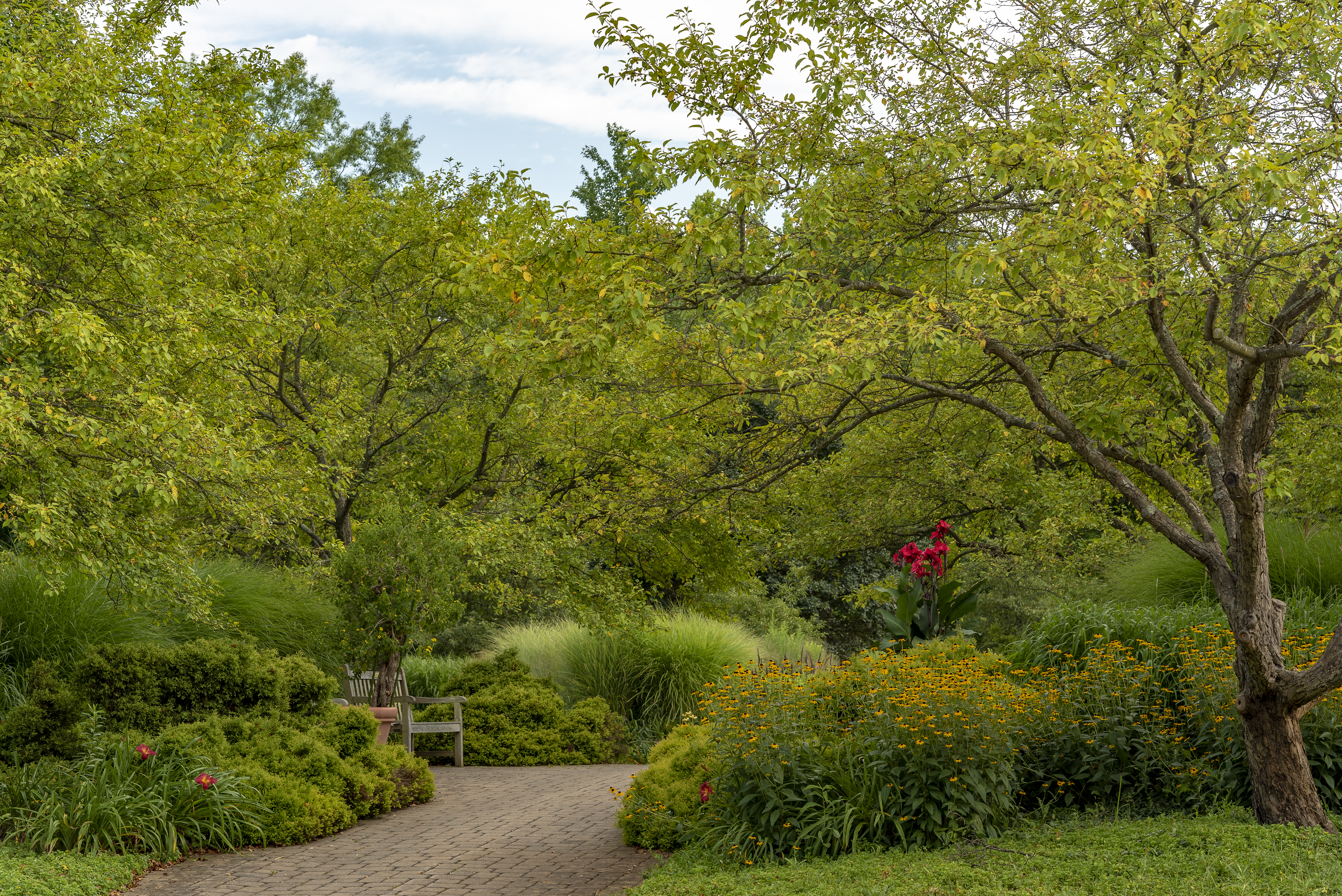
- Interactive map of Inniswood Metro Gardens
- Location: Westerville, Ohio
- Area: 123-acre (500,000 m^{2})
- Established: 1984
- Governing body: Columbus and Franklin County Metro Parks
- Website: www.inniswood.org

The Inniswood Metro Gardens (123 acres), is a botanical garden and nature preserve located at 940 South Hempstead Road in Westerville, Ohio. It is open daily from 7 am until 7pm (9pm in the summer) without an admission fee. It is part of the Metro Parks system of Columbus, Ohio.

The garden site was first established as the 37-acre (150,000 m^{2}) estate of sisters Grace and Mary Innis. They gave their home and land to Metro Parks in 1972.

The garden now contains more than 2,000 plant species, including collections of conifers, daffodils, daylilies, hostas, and theme gardens (Biblical, herbal, medicinal, rose, and woodland rock garden). Plantings include peony, bearded iris, daylilies, and naturalized daffodils. Woodland trails are lined with wildflowers.

== History ==
In 1960, sisters Grace and Mary Innis purchased a 38-acre slice of land that would become Inniswood Metro Gardens. In 1961, they moved onto the property bringing with them mementos from their childhood home on Cleveland Avenue in Linden Heights. Grace had a fondness for horticulture and studied art and horticulture at The Ohio State University. Mary enjoyed the deep woods and spotting wildlife. Together, they created extensive gardens, while preserving natural features of the land. In 1966, Grace died and Mary began the process of donating the site to the Metro Parks system as long as she could live there until her death. Most of the property was deeded in 1978, and adjacent land was purchased to buffer the site from development. Mary died in 1982.

A pond along the 0.1 miles Frog Talk Walk at Inniswood Metro Gardens in Westerville, Ohio.

In 1984, Inniswood Metro Gardens was open to the public as the eighth Columbus and Franklin County Metro Park.

== See also ==
- List of botanical gardens in the United States
