= Brad Bigler =

American college basketball coach

Current position
- Title: Head coach
- Team: Southwest Minnesota State
- Conference: NSIC

Coaching career (HC unless noted)
- 2002–03: Lakeview High (women's)
- 2009–present: SMSU

Head coaching record
- Overall: 276–210 (.568)
- Tournaments: 3–5 (NCAA Division II)

Accomplishments and honors

Championships
- 2 NSIC tournament (2012, 2017); 1 NSIC regular season (2025); 2 NSIC South Division (2017, 2018)

Brad Bigler is an American college basketball coach, currently the head coach of the Southwest Minnesota State Mustangs.

After his playing days were done, Bigler began his coaching career as the head coach for the girl's basketball team at Lakeview High School in Cottonwood, Minnesota. He coached there for one year.

In 2009, Bigler was hired as the head coach of Southwest Minnesota State. In his first season, the Mustangs went 17-12 (10-10 conference) and finished 6th in the conference. In 2012, they won the NSIC tournament for the first time in school history. In 2017, the Mustangs won their second ever NSIC Tournament championship.

== Head coaching record ==
Record table
Season	Team	Overall	Conference	Standing	Postseason
Southwest Minnesota State (NSIC) (2009–present)
2009–10	SMSU	17–12	10–10	6th	
2010–11	SMSU	12–14	9–13	8th	
2011–12	SMSU	19–11	15–7	2nd	NCAA DII first round
2012–13	SMSU	16–14	13–9	7th / 5th (South)	
2013–14	SMSU	19–12	14–8	6th / 3rd (South)	
2014–15	SMSU	12–17	8–14	11th / 6th (South)	
2015–16	SMSU	13–15	9–13	13th / 7th (South)	
2016–17	SMSU	28–6	17–5	2nd / 1st (South)	NCAA DII Regional final
2017–18	SMSU	25–9	17–5	2nd / 1st (South)	NCAA DII Regional semifinal
2018–19	SMSU	18–14	10–12	9th / 5th (South)	
2019–20	SMSU	8–21	5–17	15th / 8th (South)	
2020–21	SMSU	3–8	1–6	7th (South)	
2021–22	SMSU	14–11	10–10	T–8th / T–5th (South)	
2022–23	SMSU	16–12	12–10	8th / 4th (South)	
2023–24	SMSU	19–13	14–8	T–5th	NCAA DII first round
2024–25	SMSU	21–9	16–6	T–1st	NCAA DII first round
2025–26	SMSU	16–12	14–8	T–3rd / T–3rd (South)	
2026–27	SMSU	0–0	0–0		
Southwest Minnesota State:		276–210 (.568)	195–161 (.548)		
Total:		276–210 (.568)			
National champion Postseason invitational champion Conference regular season champion Conference regular season and conference tournament champion Division regular season champion Division regular season and conference tournament champion Conference tournament champion
