= Columbus and Franklin County Metro Parks =

Park district in Central Ohio

The Columbus and Franklin County Metro Parks are a group of 20 metropolitan parks in and around Columbus, Ohio. They are officially organized into the Columbus and Franklin County Metropolitan Park District. The Metro Parks system was organized in 1945 under Ohio Revised Code Section 1545 as a separate political division of the state of Ohio. The Metro Parks are overseen by a Board of Park Commissioners consisting of three citizens appointed to three-year terms without compensation by the Judge of the Probate Court of Franklin County, Ohio. The Board in turn appoints an Executive Director responsible for operations and management of the parks.

The Metro Parks system protects over 27,500 acres (111 km^{2}) of land and water and extends over seven counties in Central Ohio and the Hocking Hills area. Facilities and programs include trails, shelters, lodges, nature centers, educational facilities and programs, natural resources management, stormwater management, picnicking, boating, and other recreational activities.

== History ==
The Columbus and Franklin County Metro Parks system was created in 1945 after a study was commissioned by the Columbus and Franklin County planning commissioners. The study endorsed the development of a metro park system with the area's rivers and streams as idea land for the parks modeled after the Cleveland Metroparks. The parks would also contribute to the preservation, protection, and restoration of natural resources. Walter A. Tucker became the first president-secretary of the Metro Parks. Tucker negotiated the first parcel of land purchase in 1947 that would become Blacklick Woods.

In 1970, Tucker retired and was succeeded by Edward F. Hutchins as president-secretary.

== Governance ==
The three Board of Park Commissioners are appointed to terms of three years by the Judge of the Probate Court of Franklin County. The board approve land acquisitions, development, policies and regulations, and financial transactions. Park Commissioners oversee administrative operations of Metro Parks.

== Parks ==
Map

=== Battelle Darby Creek ===
Located along the southwest boundary of Franklin County Battelle Darby Creek is the largest Metro Park at over 7,103 acres (2,874 ha). The park encompasses lands and creek beds north and south of the confluence of the Big and Little Darby Creeks. Unique features include restored tallgrass prairie areas totalling 2,000 acres (810 ha) that house a group of 10 American bison, a large nature center with exhibits about the exceptional biodiversity of Big Darby Creek, and a Fort Ancient mound. Thirteen miles of the Big Darby Creek and Little Darby Creek flow through the park. Much of the land for the park was donated by the Battelle Memorial Institute. The northern parcel lies just outside the town of West Jefferson (In Madison County). The park follows the Darby Creeks south past the village of Georgesville and continues towards the crossroads of Darbydale. Detached parcels of the park extend along Darby Creek to the village of Harrisburg (into Pickaway County).

=== Blacklick Woods ===
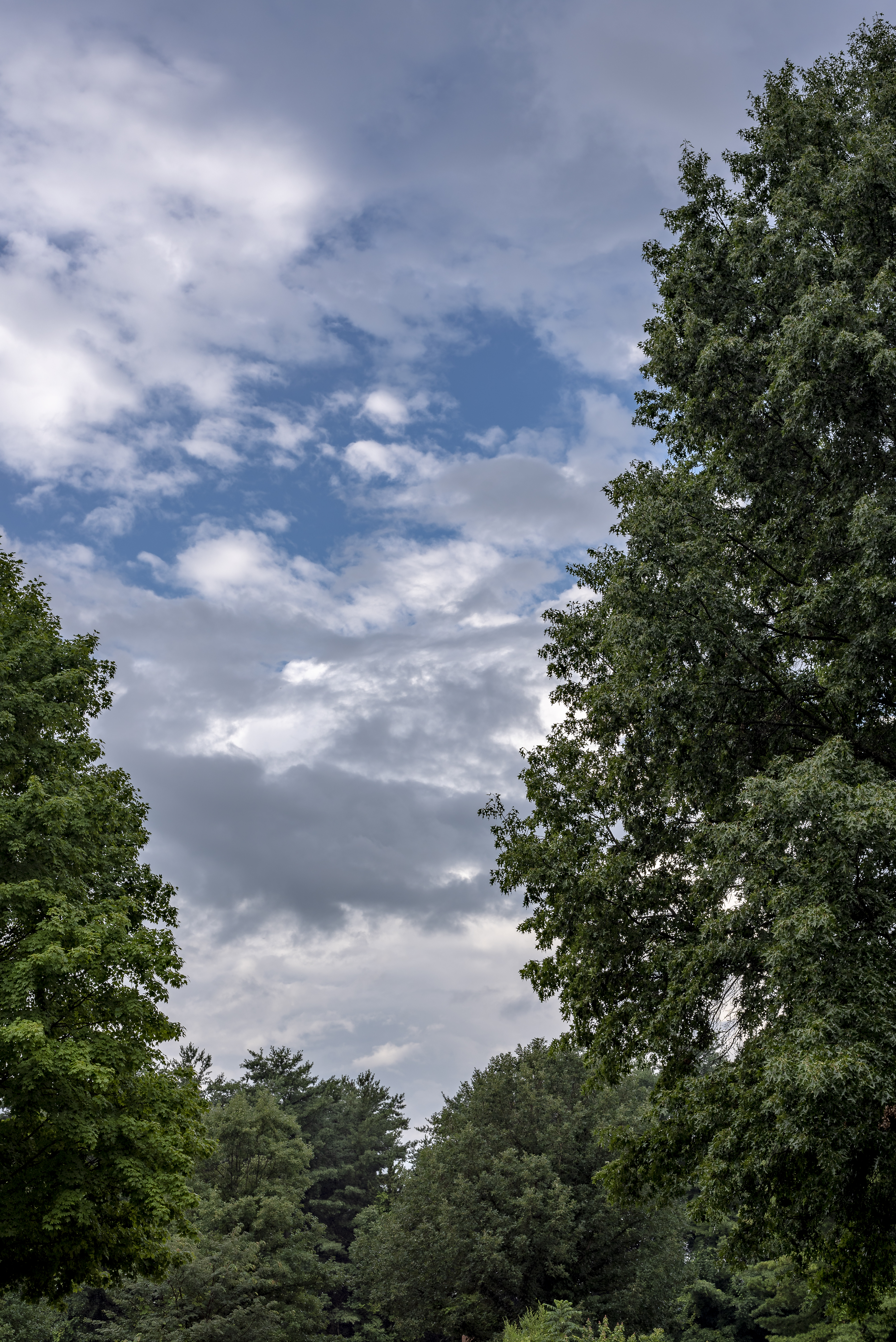
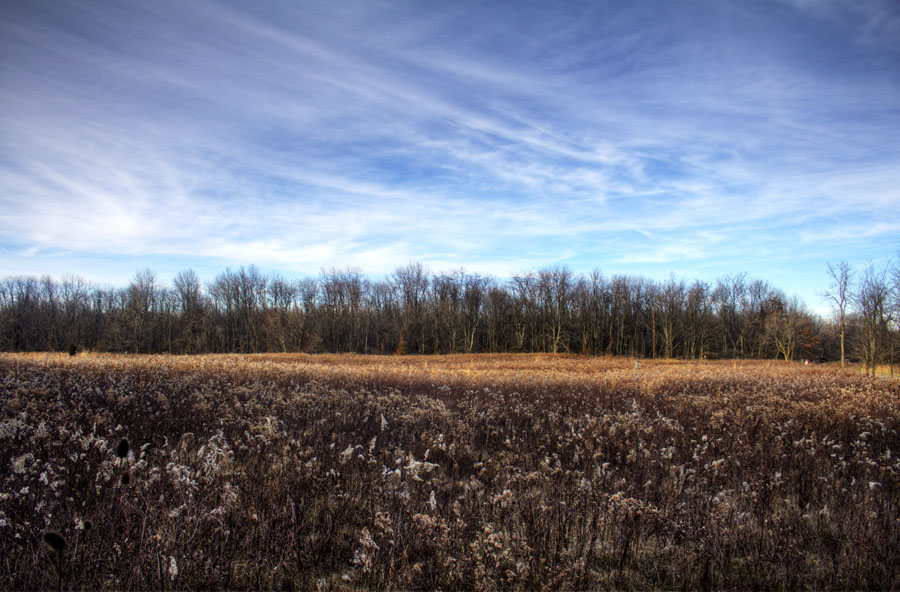
Blacklick Woods Metro Park

Opened in 1948, and located in Reynoldsburg, this 643-acre (260 ha) park is the oldest park in the system. Within the forested area of the park is the Walter A. Tucker State Nature Preserve preserving one of the oldest Beech-maple forest in central Ohio. In the southern area of the preserve you can find an assortment of white and pin oak, white ash with specimens of red maple, red elm, shagbark and bitternut hickory, hophornbeam, American hornbeam and dogwood. There are also wetlands and seasonable ponds in the southern area of the nature preserve where salamanders, chorus frogs, and wood ducks among other aquatic life and amphibians can be found. Fox, Rabbits, and White-Tailed Deer can also be seen throughout the park. It is also well known as a good spot for bird watching. The Golf Course has been certified by Audubon International as a Cooperative Sanctuary. The Blacklick Woods Nature Center with Naturalists and volunteers is also available to answer questions. Blacklick Creek flows south along the eastern boundary of the park and is accessible by several trails that travel through a variety of fields, meadows, and forests.

In 1974, Blacklick Woods was designated as a National Natural Landmark by the National Park Service.

=== Blendon Woods ===
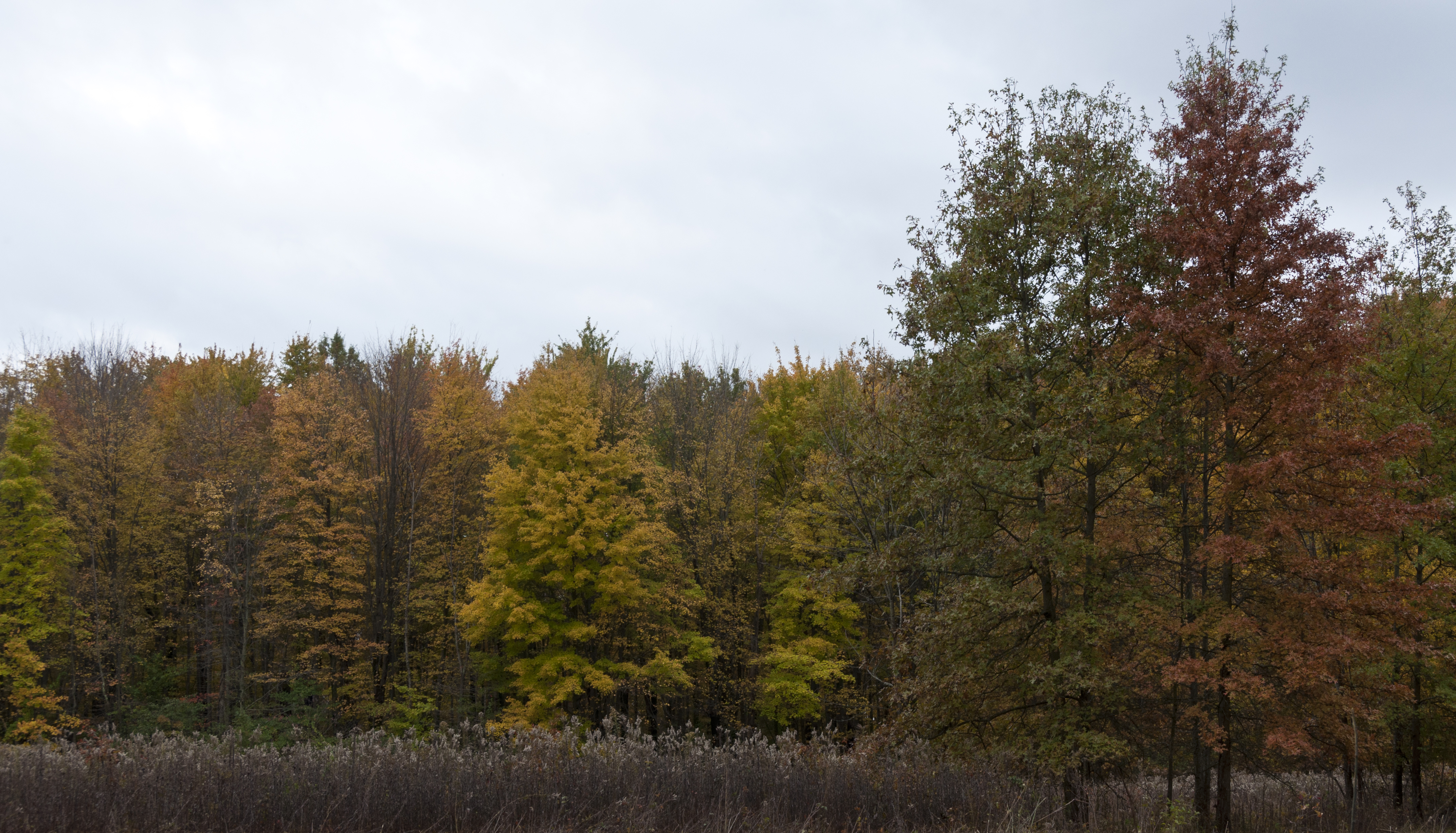
Blendon Woods forests in fall

Located in Northeast Columbus near Westerville, the 653-acre (264 ha) Blendon Woods contains rolling forest land along with the 118-acre (48 ha) Walden Waterfowl Refuge with its 11-acre Thoreau Lake. The park also features a nature center, natural play area and a disc golf course.

=== Chestnut Ridge ===
Opened in 1988, Chestnut Ridge is located on the first ridge in the foothills of the Appalachian Mountains southeast of Columbus near Carroll. At 1,116 feet (340 m) above sea level, it rises approximately 300 feet above the surrounding land. On clear days, it is possible to see the skyline of Downtown Columbus from one of the overlook points on top of the ridge. Other features of the park include picnic areas and extensive mountain biking trails.

=== Clear Creek ===
The most remote of all Columbus Metro Parks, Clear Creek is located near Rockbridge in the Hocking Hills region of southeast Ohio. Nearly the entire park is designated a State Nature Preserve, making off trail activity prohibited. Unique features of the park include stands of hemlock trees, numerous deep hollows, and wildflowers.

=== Glacier Ridge ===
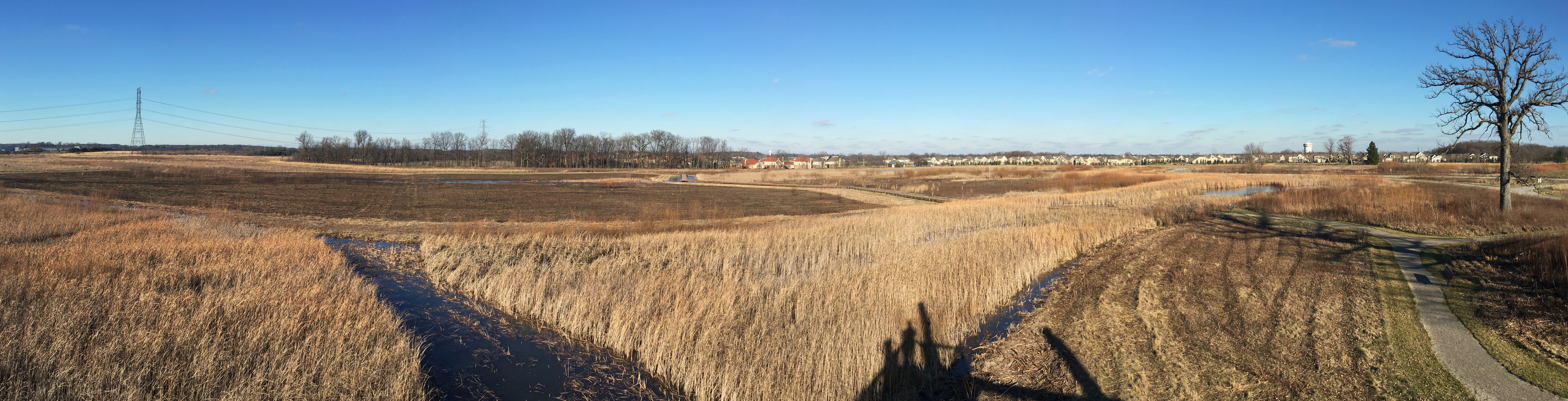
Glacier Ridge Metro Park

Just northwest of Dublin, Glacier Ridge opened to the public in 2002. The park contains a paved multi-use trail, a disc golf course, a bridle trail, and a large wetland area.

=== Heritage Trail ===
This linear park located in Hilliard opened in 1995. The primary feature of the park is a 7-mile (11 km) multi-use trail.

=== Highbanks ===
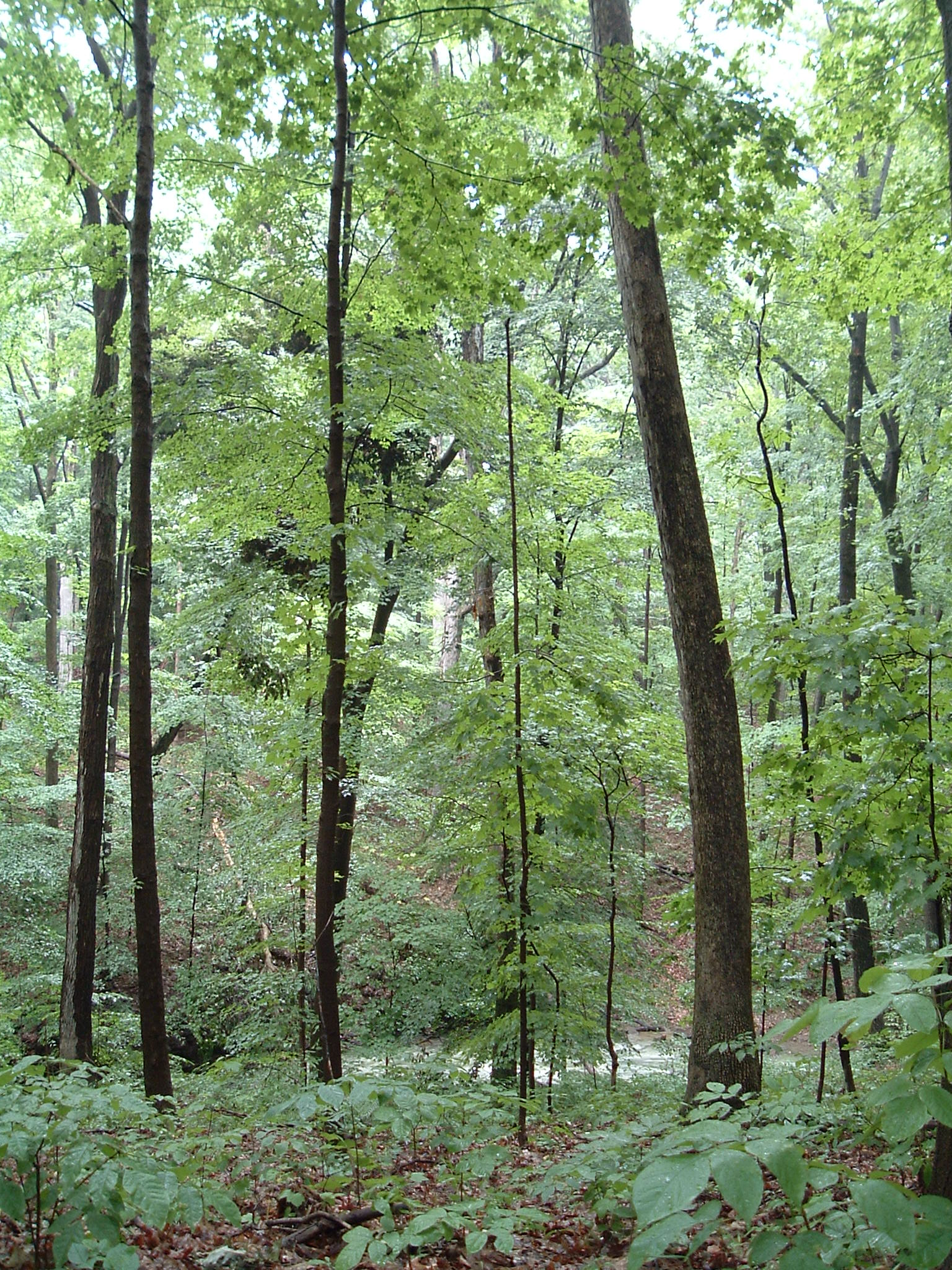
Highbanks Metro Park

The most visited in the park system, Highbanks Metro Park contains exceptional natural features and was designated as a National Natural Landmark. Located near Lewis Center, the park was named for large shale bluffs that overlook the Olentangy River. Within the park is a large nature center, a sledding hill, a Natural Play Area where off trail activity is permitted, Adena culture mounds, and the Edward F. Hutchins State Nature Preserve.

=== Homestead ===
In Hilliard, Ohio, Homestead is a 44-acre (18 ha) park in Hilliard featuring a covered bridge, a replica train station and an outdoor amphitheater. It has a 0.75-mile paved trail which connects to the 7-mile Heritage Trail, which runs along the park's western border.

=== Inniswood Metro Gardens ===
Unique among the Metro Parks, Inniswood Metro Gardens (also known as Inniswood Botanical Garden and Nature Preserve) is primarily a managed botanical garden. Located in Westerville, there are a number of theme gardens that showcase various plant communities.

=== Pickerington Ponds ===
Pickerington Ponds is a 1,608-acre (651 ha) park with several trails and 5 overlooks for bird and other wildlife watching. A State Nature Preserve in Southeast Columbus, this park was first acquired in 1986. It is primarily focused on providing a habitat for various birds and contains many wetland areas. Pickerington Ponds is designated an Important Bird Area by Audubon Ohio. More than 260 species of birds have been seen here.

=== Prairie Oaks ===
Located on the Franklin and Madison County border, Prairie Oaks first opened to the public in 2000. As the name suggests, the park contains large areas of restored Oak Savannah that were common in the area prior to European settlement in the 1800s. A former quarry area in the eastern part of the park provides boating opportunities as well as a canine swimming area.

=== Quarry Trails ===
Located on the west side of Columbus in the community of San Margherita, Quarry Trails is a 220-acre (89 ha) park that was formerly the Marble Cliff Quarry. The quarry was the largest limestone quarry in the United States from its opening in the mid-19th century until its sale around 1985. On November 30, 2021, the first 62-acre section of the park opened to the public and allows for biking, hiking, fishing, rock climbing, canoeing, paddle-boarding, floating boardwalks, a zipline, and a sledding hill. The park is situated within a larger development which will have apartments, townhomes, condominiums, office space and retail.

=== Rocky Fork ===
Rocky Fork Metro Park is in Westerville, Ohio. It features about 1,000 acres (400 ha) of woods and fields. The park includes a bridle trail, dog park and off-leash dog trail, a paved trail and nature trails plus a picnic shelter and wetlands. Rocky Fork runs through the park, which is a partnership with New Albany, the City of Columbus and Plain Township.

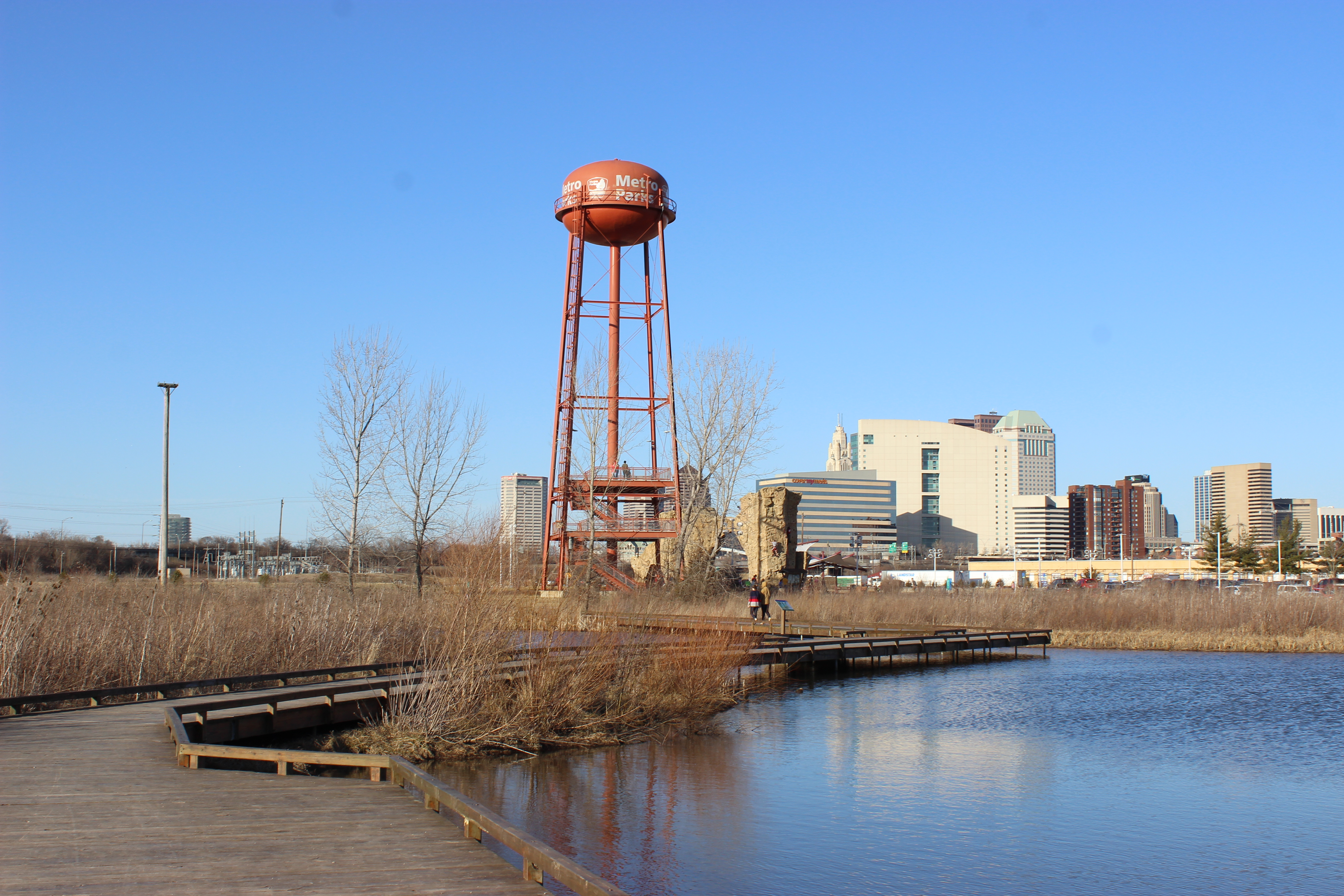
Scioto Audubon Metro Park

=== Scioto Audubon ===
The most urban of the Metro Parks, Scioto Audubon is located in the Brewery District near Downtown Columbus. The park is a major bird migration stopover, and as such hosts the Grange Insurance Audubon Center. Opened in 2008, the park is situated on a peninsula stretching into the Scioto River and contains numerous wetland areas. Other features include multi-use trail connection to the north and south, a climbing wall, and an old water tower with an overlook deck.

=== Scioto Grove ===
Located in Grove City, Ohio, the 19th Metro Park opened in May 2016 and features five backpacking sites as well as seven miles of trails through woods and along the river.

=== Sharon Woods ===
Named for Sharon Township where it is located, this park is among the most frequently visited. The park also includes the 320-acre (130 ha) Edward S. Thomas Nature Preserve containing eight different species of old growth oak trees, some more than 250 years old. The northern part of the nature preserve contains the Spring Hollow Outdoor Education Center lands. The ravine bottom around Spring Creek has a multitude of different trees including various sycamore, butternut, black walnut, Ohio buckeye, pawpaw and red elm. The southern part of the nature preserve which contains several trails and an observation deck contains fields, and meadows accompanying forests such as oak-hickory association with scattered beech with a recovering elm-ash swamp forest including red elm, with white, green and blue ash trees.

Schrock Lake provides fishing opportunities as well as ample opportunities for bird watching. A multi-use trail runs along the perimeter of the park. along with 4 additional designated trails that traverse various areas of Sharon Woods Metro Park.

=== Slate Run ===
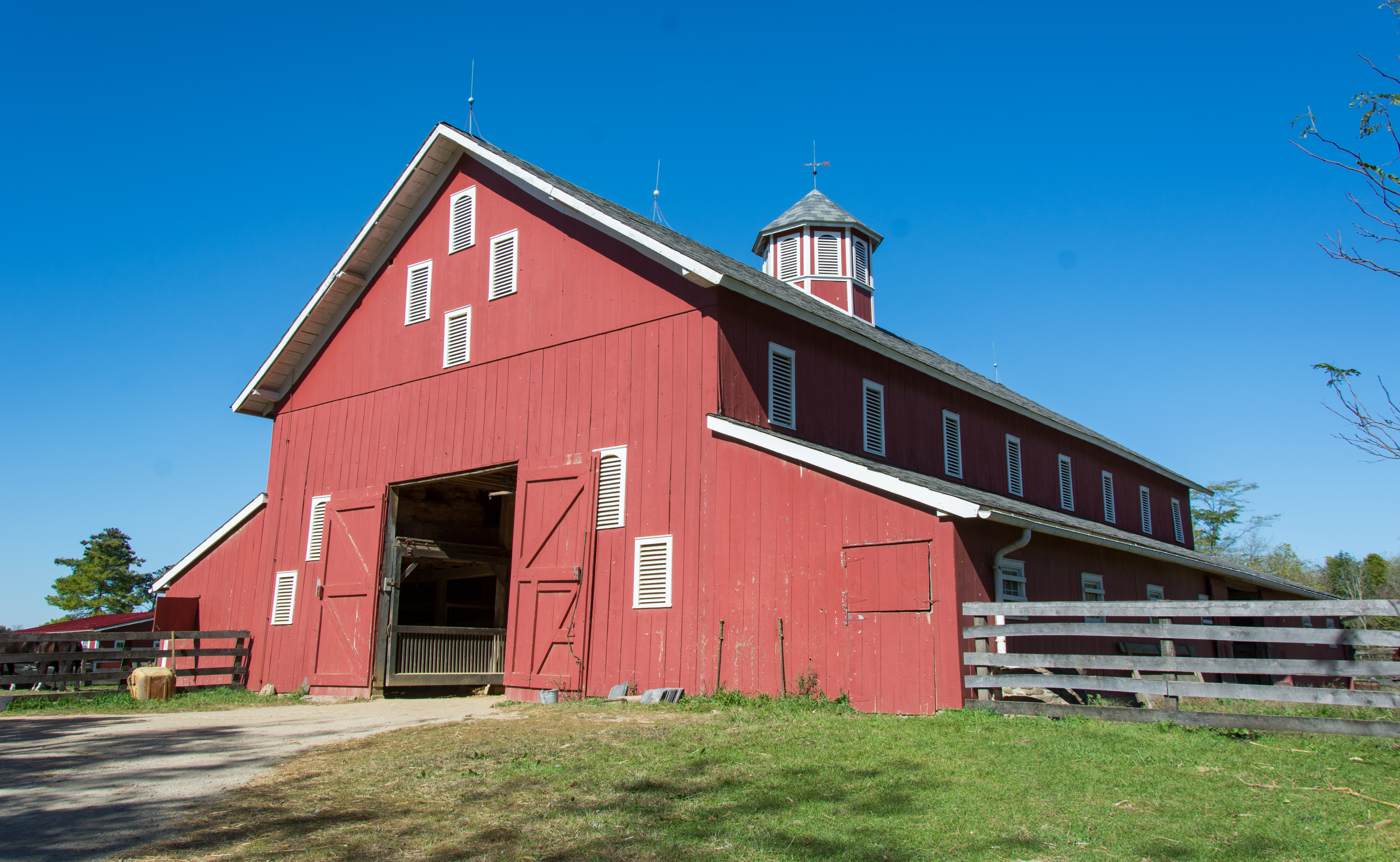
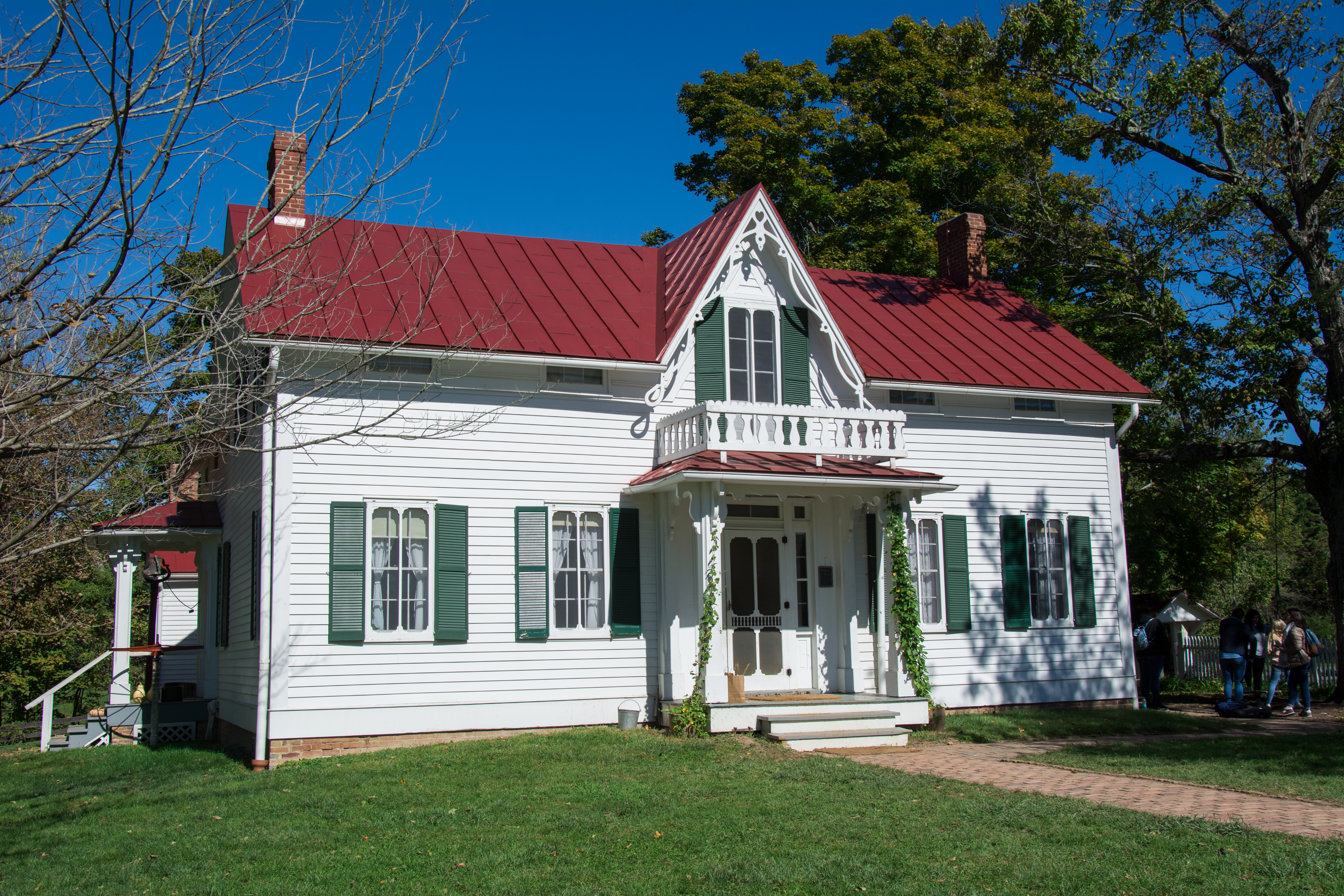
Barn and farmhouse at Slate Run Living Historical Farm

South of Canal Winchester, Slate Run Metro Park's most notable feature is an 1880s-era working historical farm staffed by volunteers. Visitors can see 19th century farm life, interact with the farm animals, and learn about canning and meat preservation. Other parts of the park include extensive hiking trails and a restored wetland area.

=== Three Creeks ===
Managed in cooperation with the City of Columbus, Three Creeks is located near Groveport and Bexley. Along the confluence trail, visitors can see where Alum, Big Walnut and Blacklick Creeks merge. Picnic areas, lakes, and extensive trails round out the features of this park.

=== Walnut Woods ===
Opened in 2011, this park encompasses a former tree nursery. Located just east of the village of Groveport, Walnut Woods also includes two dog parks - one for large dogs and one for small dogs. Wetland restoration is ongoing in the central part of the park.

== Future ==
Columbus Metro Parks is continuing to expand with more acquisitions of land. One such expansion is in Blendon Township and is planned to remain rustic and primitive. The land currently under the management team from Blendon Woods Metro Park.
