= Bigler =

Bigler can refer to:

== People ==
- Bigler (surname)

== Places ==
- Bigler's Mill, Virginia
- Bigler Township, Clearfield County, Pennsylvania
- Bigler, Pennsylvania, a census-designated place in Bradford Township, Clearfield County, Pennsylvania
- Bigler Field, an athletic field at Penn State University
- Bigler Hall, a residence hall at Penn State University
- Lake Bigler, California, a former name of Lake Tahoe
- Bigler Nunataks, a cluster of nunataks in Oates Land, Antarctica

== Streets and roads ==
- Bigler Street, a street in Philadelphia; see Whitman, Philadelphia
- Bigler Avenue, a street in Spangler, Pennsylvania
- Bigler Road, a street in University Park, Pennsylvania; see Penn State Berkey Creamery

== See also ==
- Biglerville, Pennsylvania
