= Marble Cliff, Ohio =

- Village
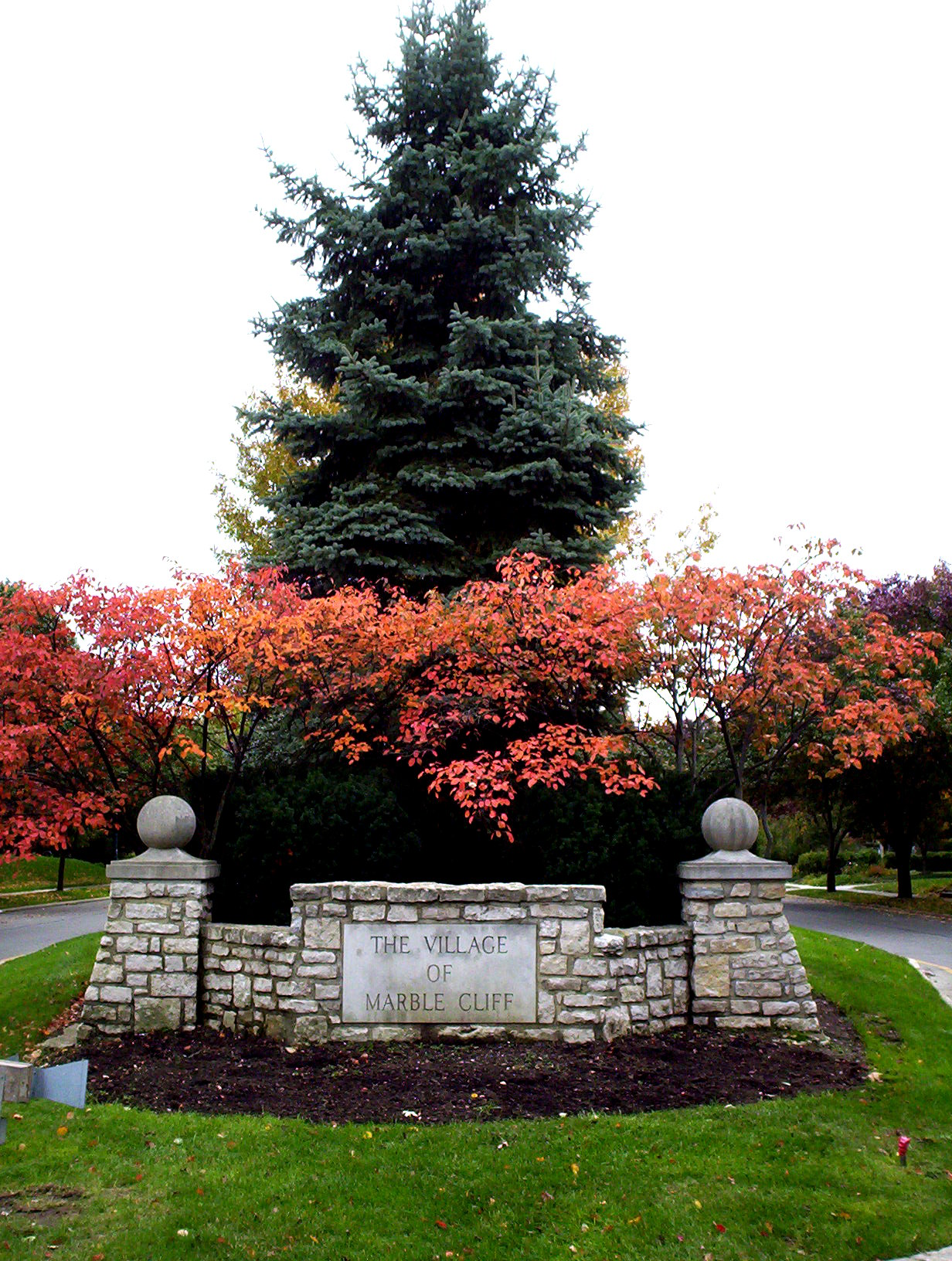
- Stone marker for Marble Cliff

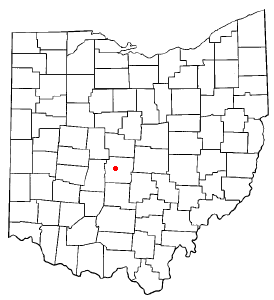
- Location of Marble Cliff within Ohio

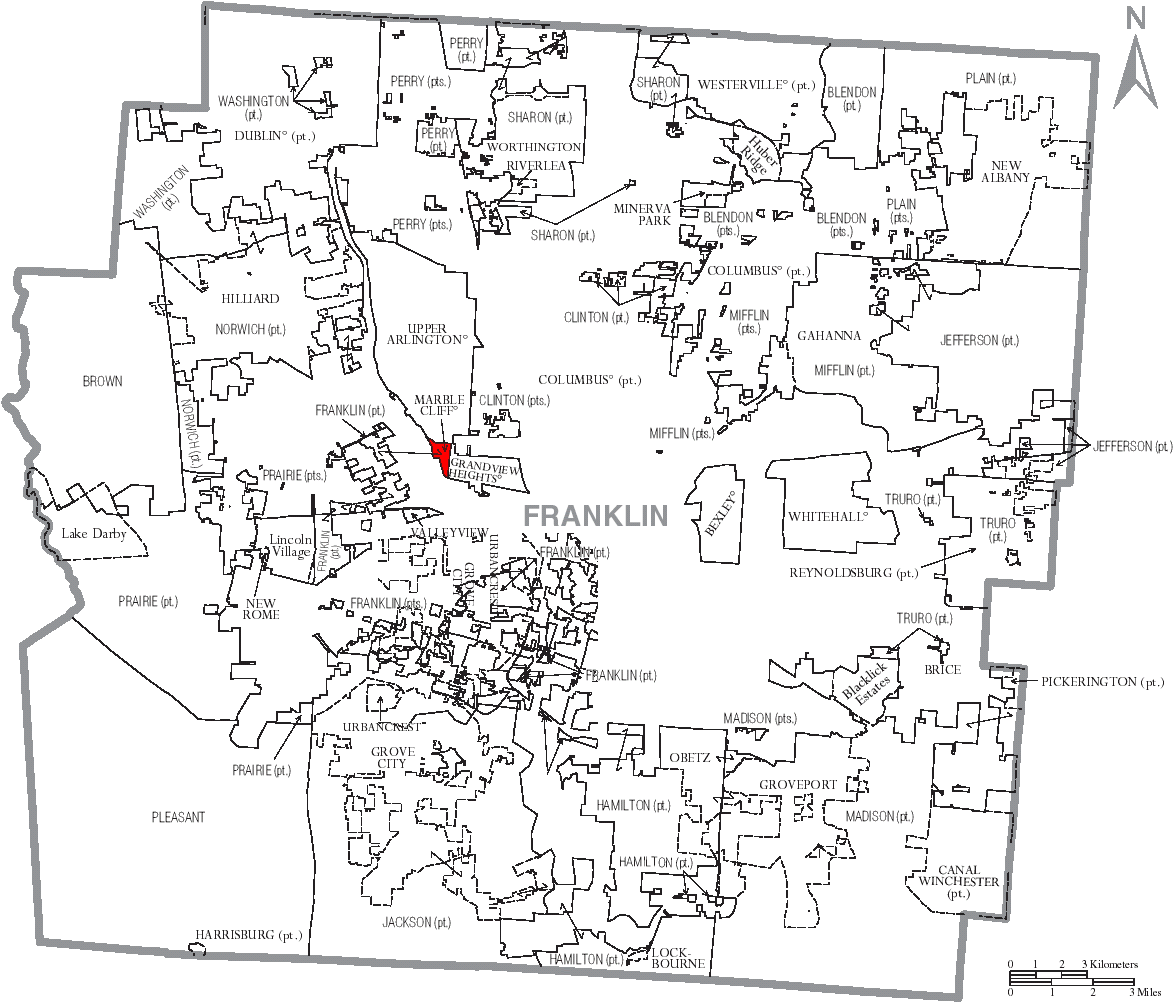
- Location of Marble Cliff within Franklin County
- Coordinates: 39°59′08″N 83°03′41″W
- Country: United States
- State: Ohio
- County: Franklin

Area
  - Total: 0.28 sq mi (0.73 km^{2})
  - Land: 0.28 sq mi (0.73 km^{2})
  - Water: 0 sq mi (0.00 km^{2})
- Elevation: 781 ft (238 m)

Population (2020)
  - Total: 634
  - Density: 2,259.1/sq mi (872.23/km^{2})
- Time zone: UTC-5 (Eastern (EST))
  - Summer (DST): UTC-4 (EDT)
- ZIP code: 43212
- Area code(s): 614 and 380
- FIPS code: 39-47474
- GNIS feature ID: 2399251
- Website: www.marblecliff.org

Marble Cliff is a village in Franklin County, Ohio, United States. The population was 634 at the 2020 census.

Marble Cliff was one of the first suburbs of Columbus, Ohio, settled as a community in 1890 and incorporated as the "Hamlet of Marble Cliff" in 1901. It took its name from the Marble Cliff Quarry Co. (still in use today), and at this time stretched all the way from the Scioto River to the Olentangy River. In 1902, it detached all land but its present area, and the area that separated became Grandview Heights in 1906. The village was named "Arlington" for a short time, which led its new neighbor to the north, incorporated in 1918, to name itself Upper Arlington. Marble Cliff is bordered by the cities of Upper Arlington, Grandview Heights, and Columbus.

Most of the village's public services are provided by contract with Grandview Heights, including police and fire, and it is included in the Grandview Heights School District and public library system.

== Geography ==
According to the United States Census Bureau, the village has a total area of 0.27 square miles (0.70 km^{2}), all land.

One notable landmark located in Marble Cliff, scarcely known outside of central Ohio, is the Bush mansion. This structure was built with stone quarried from the nearby Marble Cliff Quarry Co., and was once a residence of local industrialist and U.S. Senator Samuel Prescott Bush, grandfather and great-grandfather of U.S. Presidents George H. W. Bush and George W. Bush respectively. The Bush mansion itself was sold and converted to non-residential use (as a group home for the elderly). As of May 2007, it was renovated into upscale condominiums (Prescott Place).

== Village government ==
The Village has a Mayor/Council form of government with a Fiscal Officer and a six-member council.

Mayor: Matthew P. Cincione

Council President: Dow T. Voelker

Council Members: Bridget B. Sarna, Joanne C. Taylor, Marcia A. Thomas, Matthew E. Turner, Laura J. Youssef

Fiscal Officer Stephanie Evans; Assistant Fiscal Officer Peggy Shanahan; Solicitor Yazan Ashrawi; Engineer Caleb Zmith

== Demographics ==
Historical population
Census	Pop.	Note	%±
1910	88		—
1920	216		145.5%
1930	318		47.2%
1940	331		4.1%
1950	437		32.0%
1960	622		42.3%
1970	715		15.0%
1980	630		−11.9%
1990	633		0.5%
2000	646		2.1%
2010	573		−11.3%
2020	634		10.6%
U.S. Decennial Census 2020

=== 2010 census ===
As of the census of 2010, there were 573 people, 292 households, and 151 families residing in the village. The population density was 2,122.2 inhabitants per square mile (819.4/km^{2}). There were 321 housing units at an average density of 1,188.9 per square mile (459.0/km^{2}). The racial makeup of the village was 97.9% White, 0.5% African American, 1.0% Asian, 0.2% from other races, and 0.3% from two or more races. Hispanic or Latino of any race were 1.6% of the population.

There were 292 households, of which 18.2% had children under the age of 18 living with them, 45.5% were married couples living together, 3.8% had a female householder with no husband present, 2.4% had a male householder with no wife present, and 48.3% were non-families. 42.5% of all households were made up of individuals, and 16.8% had someone living alone who was 65 years of age or older. The average household size was 1.96 and the average family size was 2.72.

The median age in the village was 48.6 years. 17.8% of residents were under the age of 18; 4.3% were between the ages of 18 and 24; 22.2% were from 25 to 44; 35.3% were from 45 to 64; and 20.6% were 65 years of age or older. The gender makeup of the village was 49.4% male and 50.6% female.

=== 2000 census ===
As of the census of 2000, there were 646 people, 291 households, and 139 families residing in the village. The population density was 2,610.1 inhabitants per square mile (1,007.8/km^{2}). There were 303 housing units at an average density of 1,224.2 per square mile (472.7/km^{2}). The racial makeup of the village was 98.14% White, 0.62% African American, 0.93% Asian, 0.15% from other races, and 0.15% from two or more races. Hispanic or Latino of any race were 0.31% of the population.

There were 291 households, out of which 17.5% had children under the age of 18 living with them, 42.3% were married couples living together, 2.7% had a female householder with no husband present, and 52.2% were non-families. 44.0% of all households were made up of individuals, and 19.2% had someone living alone who was 65 years of age or older. The average household size was 1.94 and the average family size was 2.76.

In the village, the population was spread out, with 15.3% under the age of 18, 5.9% from 18 to 24, 21.7% from 25 to 44, 25.2% from 45 to 64, and 31.9% who were 65 years of age or older. The median age was 49 years. For every 100 females there were 71.4 males. For every 100 females age 18 and over, there were 65.3 males.

The median income for a household in the village was $49,904, and the median income for a family was $90,000. Males had a median income of $45,938 versus $33,250 for females. The per capita income for the village was $35,491. About 1.4% of families and 3.4% of the population were below the poverty line, including 5.6% of those under age 18 and 3.1% of those age 65 or over.

== Gallery ==
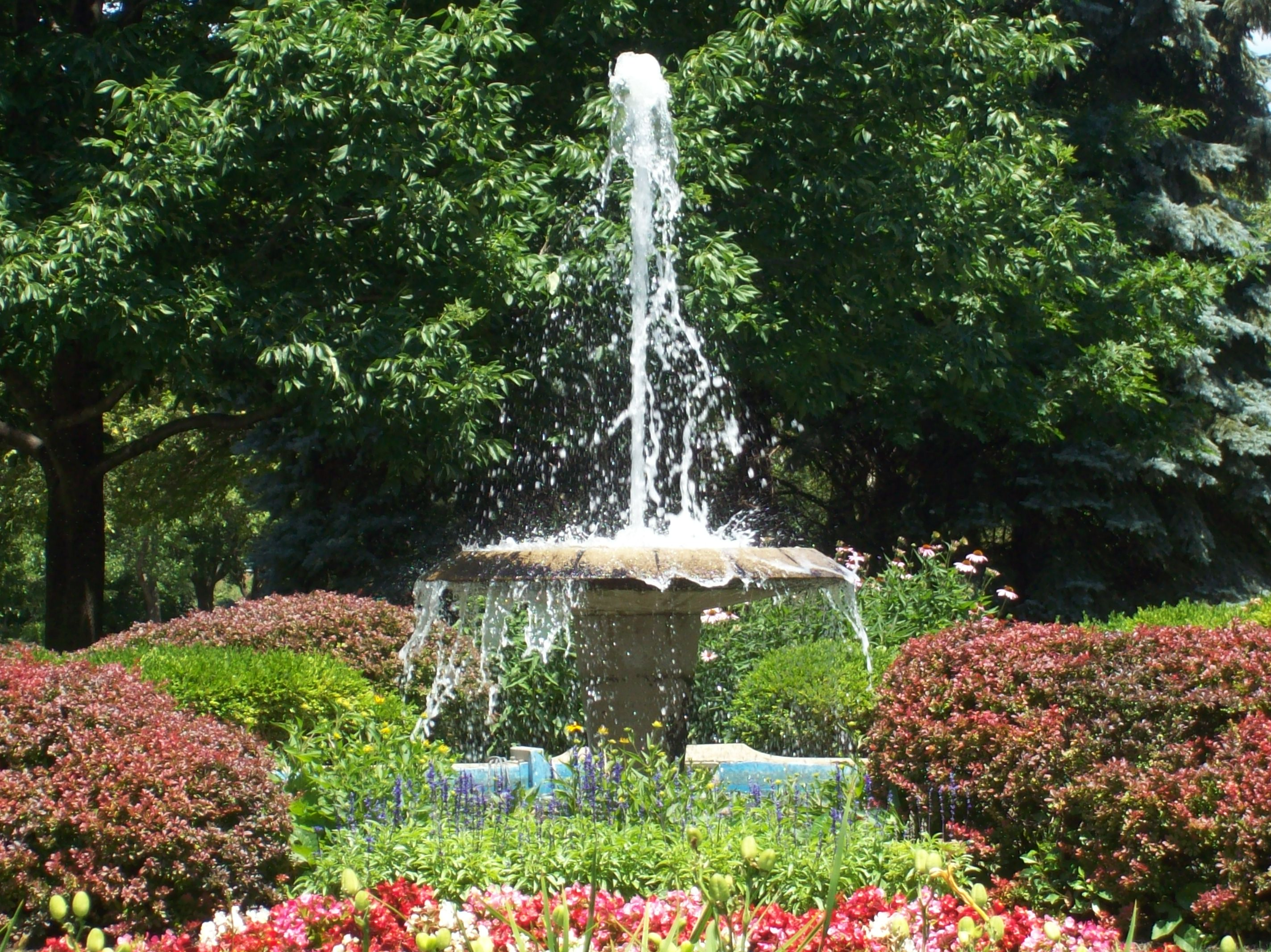
Frank G. Monaco Fountain on Cambridge Blvd

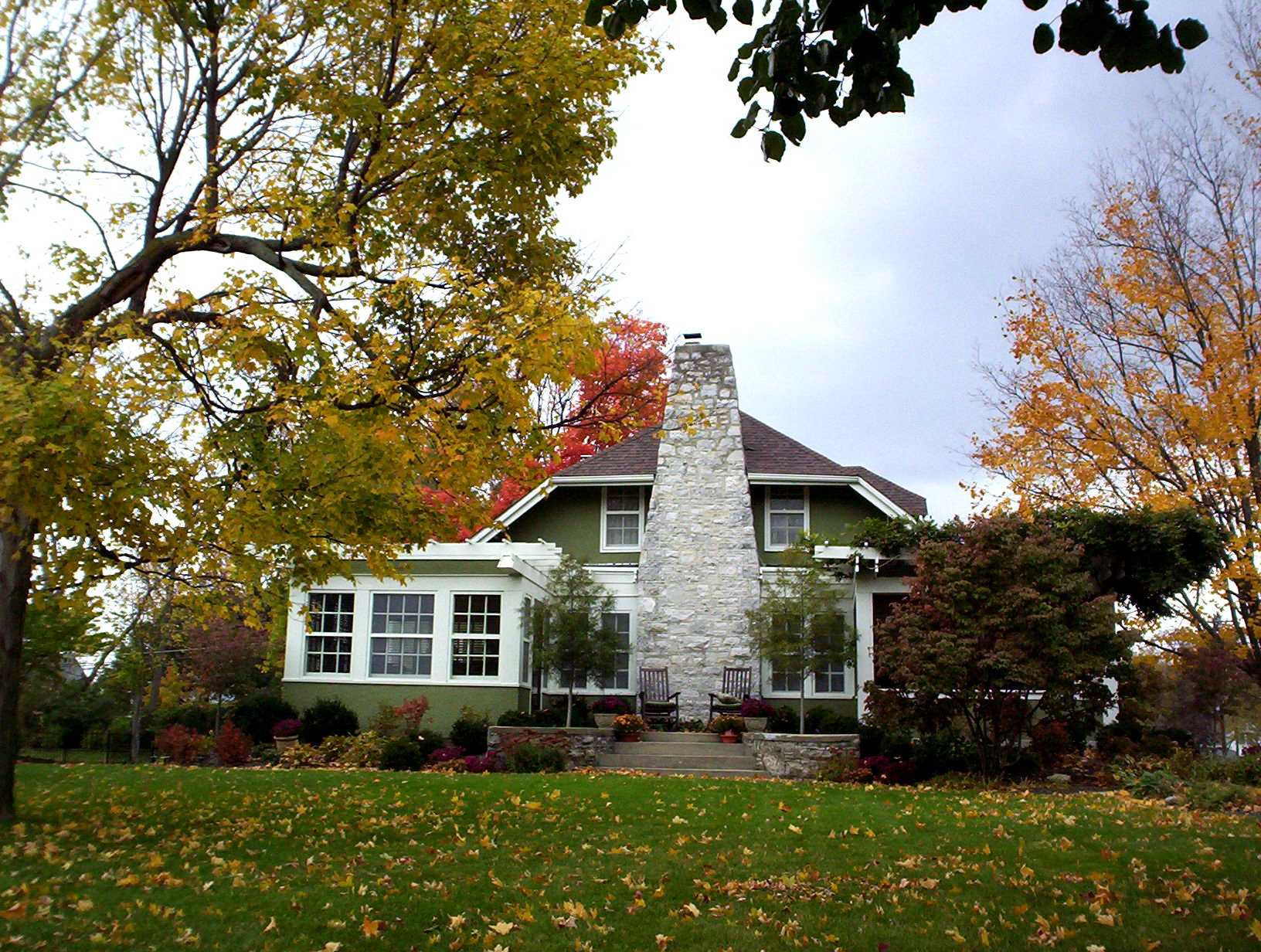
A home in Marble Cliff

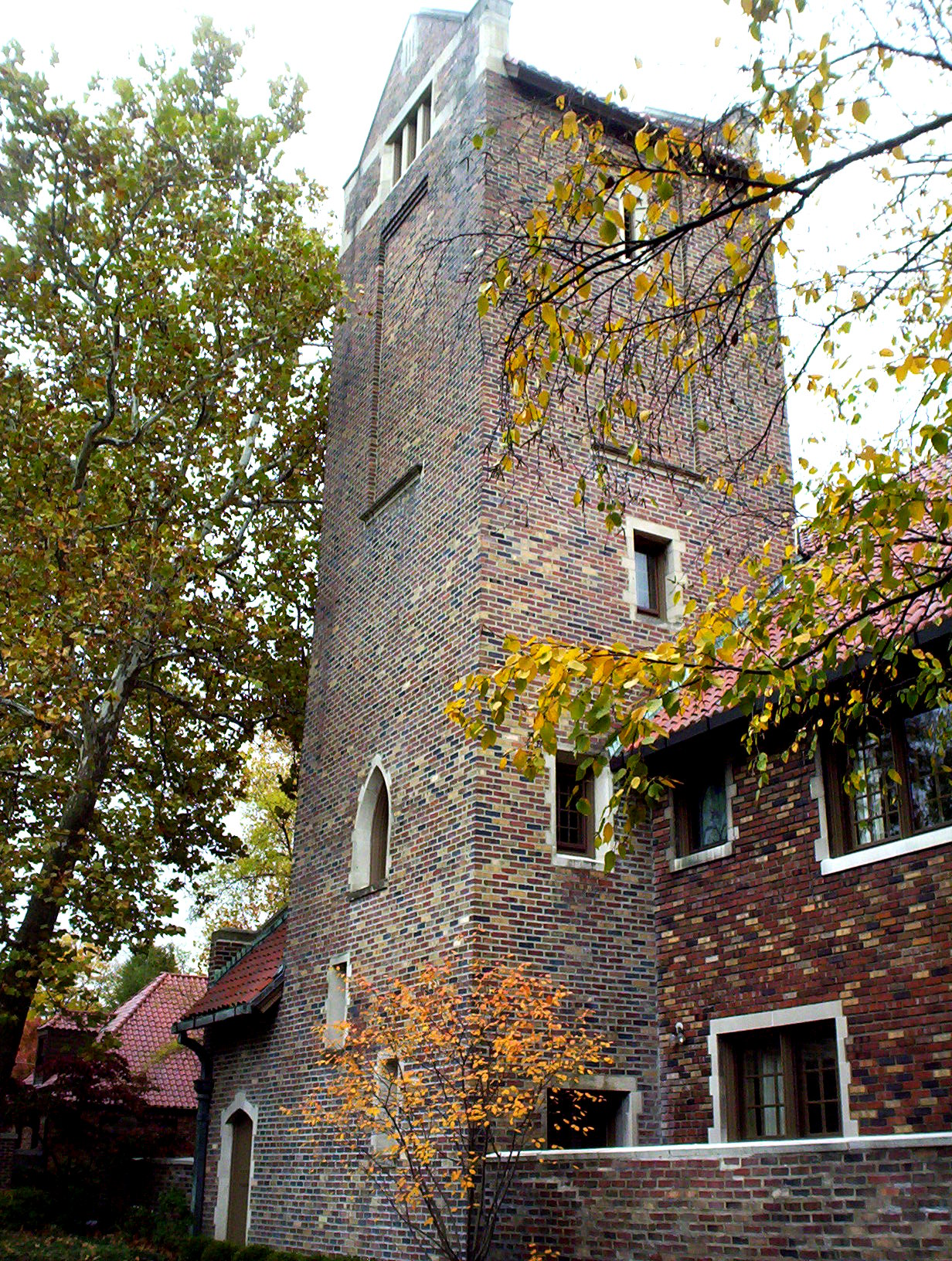
Part of "Casparis Castle", the tower of the carriage house of the quarry owner from where he could check on the quarry production; now #10 Arlington condominiums

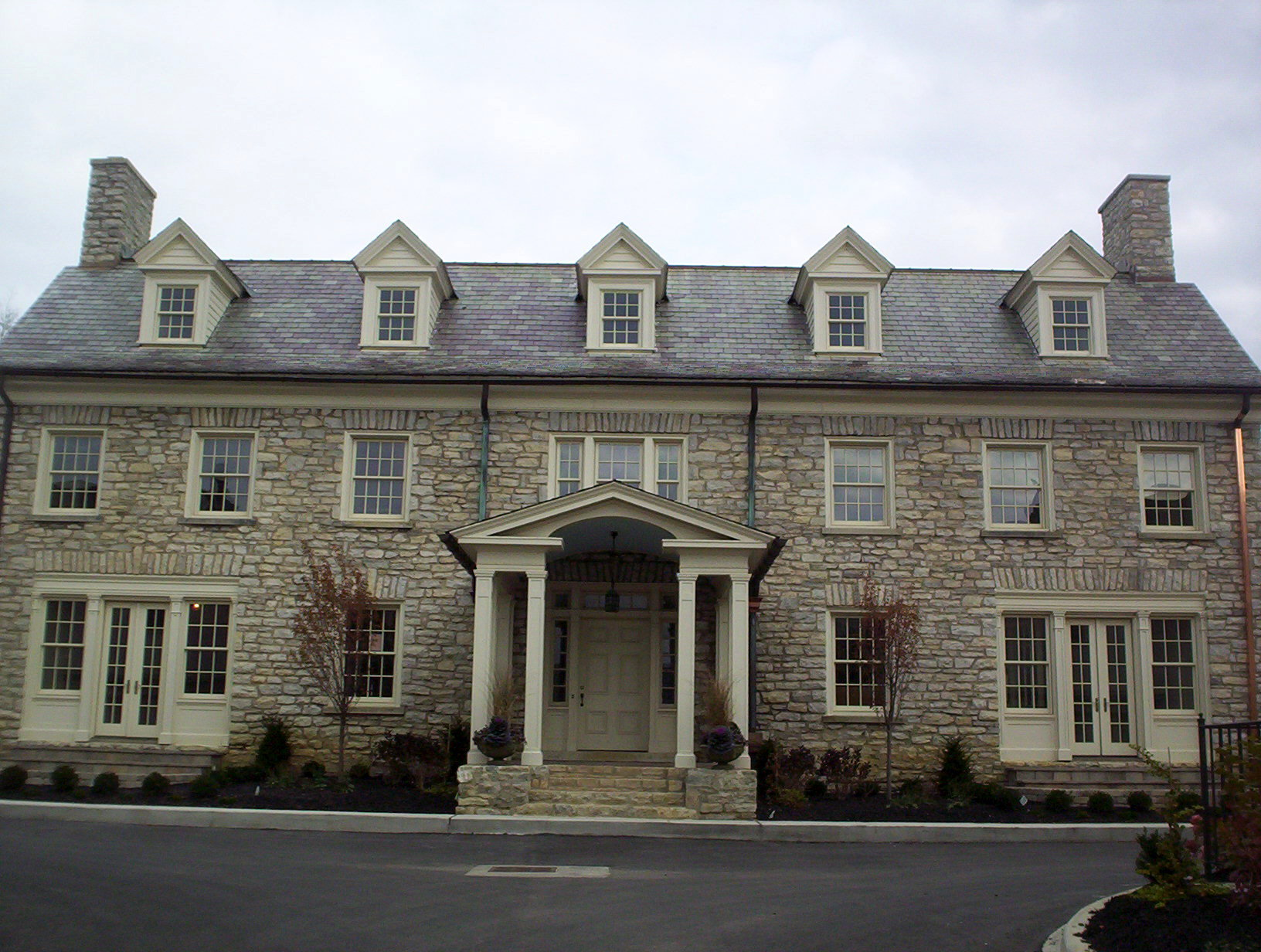
Mansion of Samuel Prescott Bush; George H. W. Bush's grandfather; now Prescott Place condominiums

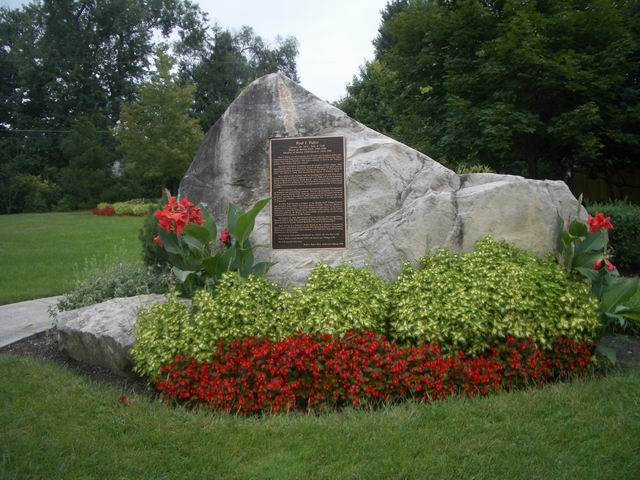
Falco Park monument honoring former Mayor Paul J. Falco

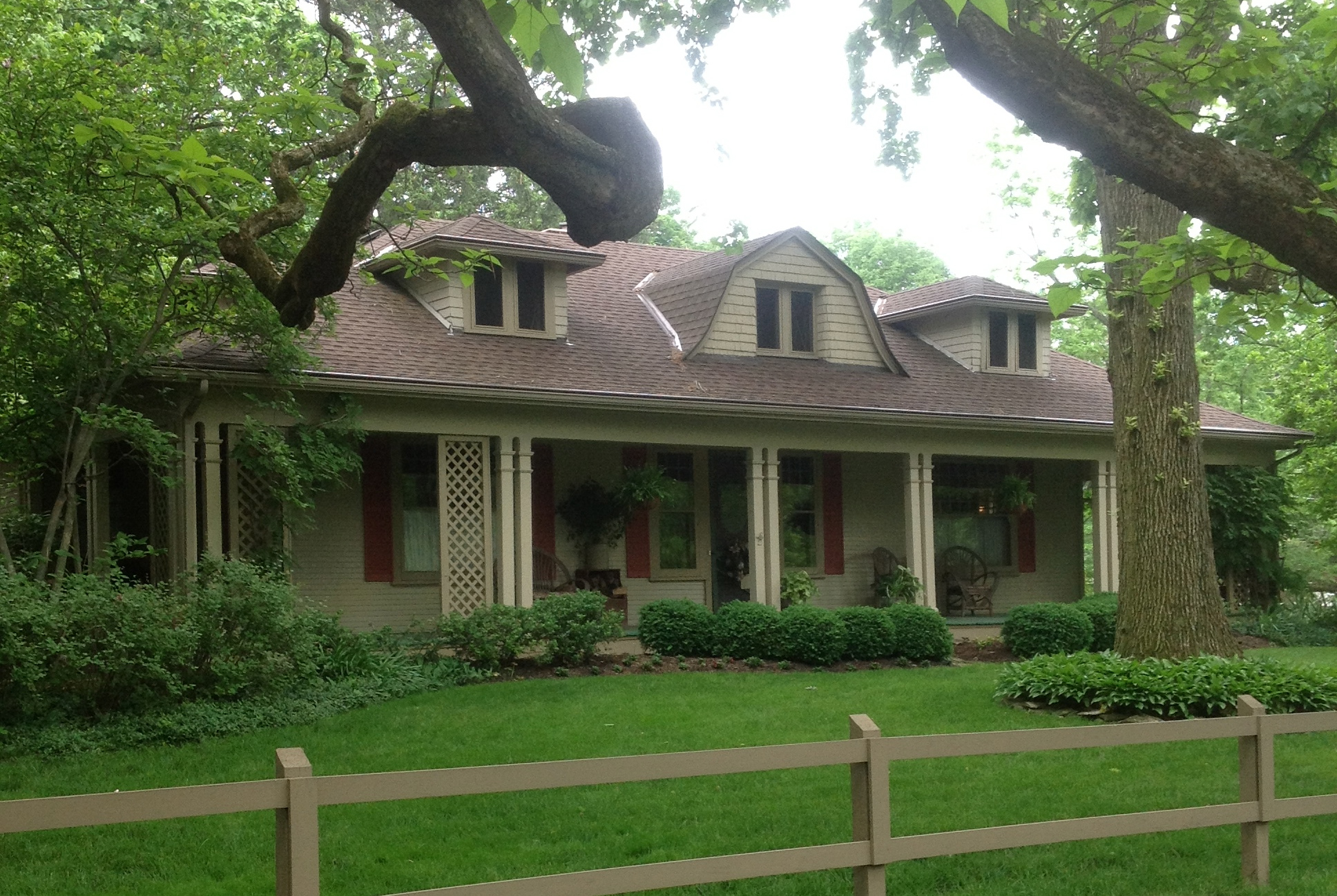
Frank Packard-designed village home today

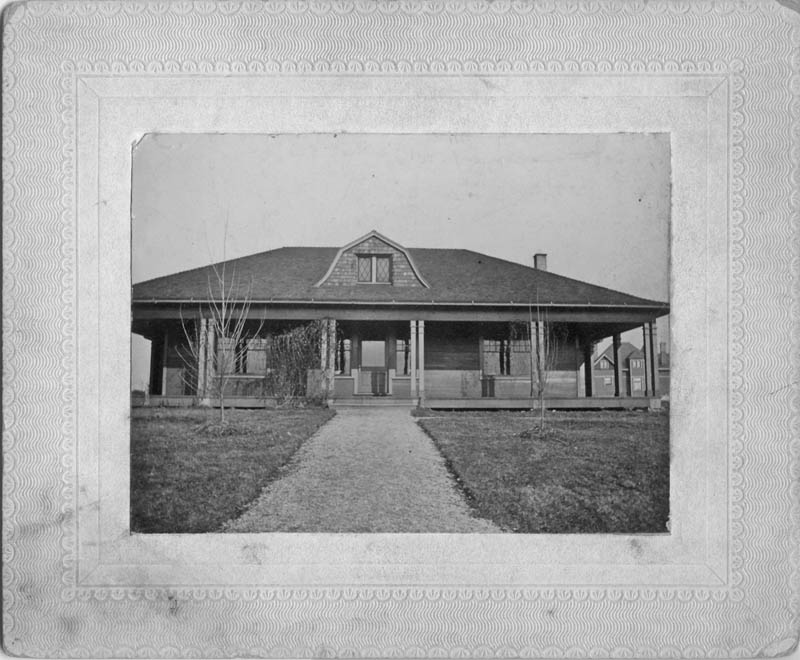
Frank Packard designed village home as originally built

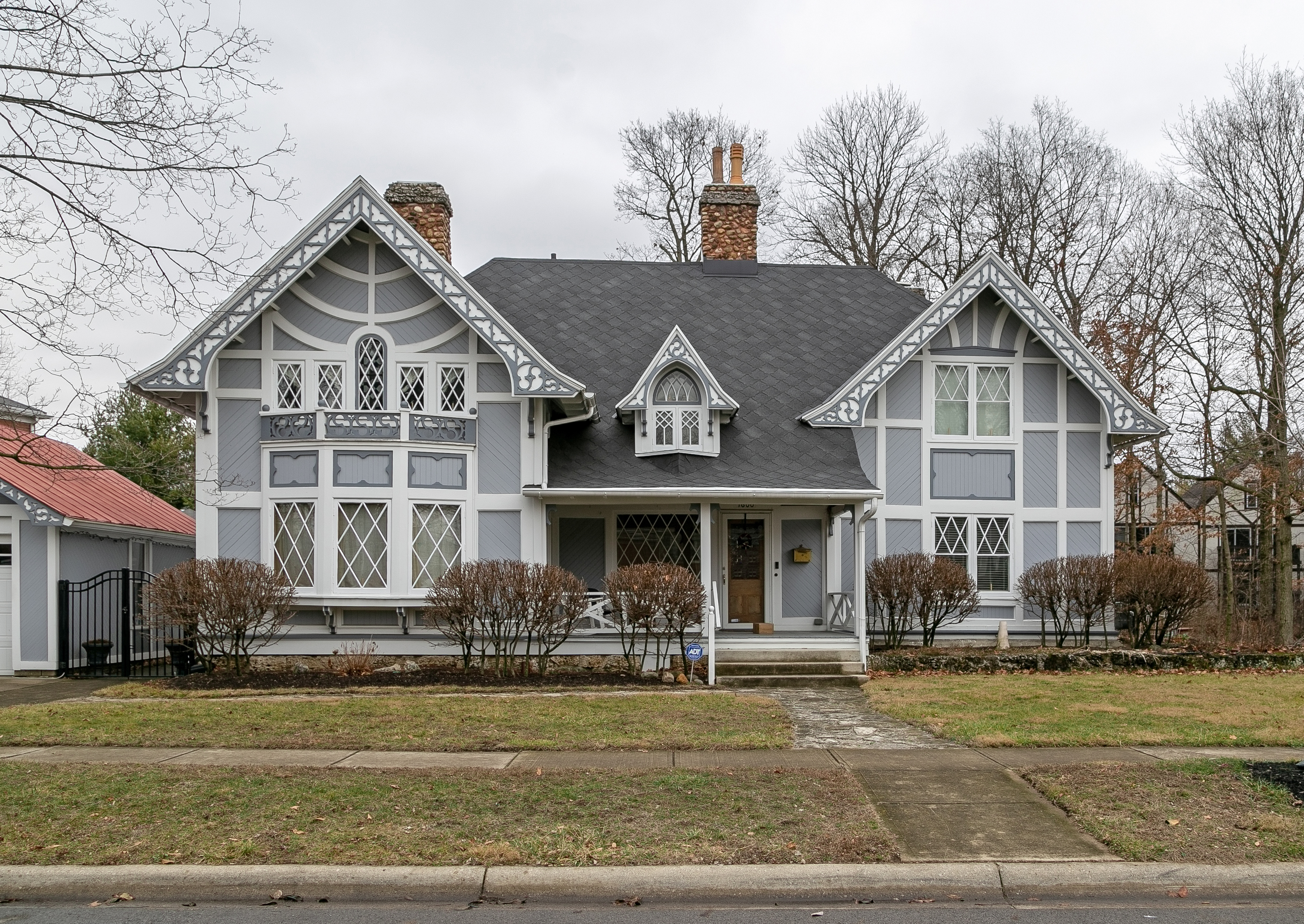
Frank Packard-designed village home on National Register of Historic Places
