= Fairfield Union High School =

Location
- 6675 Cincinnati-Zanesville Road NE; Lancaster, (Fairfield County), Ohio 43130; United States; 39°45′16″N 82°28′22″W

Information
- Type: Public, Coeducational high school
- Established: 1962
- School district: Fairfield Union Local School District
- Superintendent: Chad Belville
- Principal: Matt McPhail
- Faculty: 48
- Teaching staff: 32.00 (FTE)
- Grades: 9-12
- Enrollment: 561 (2023-2024)
- Student to teacher ratio: 17.53
- Campus size: 134-acre (0.54 km^{2})
- Colors: Red, black and white
- Athletics conference: Mid-State League
- Team name: Falcons
- Rivals: Amanda Clearcreek Aces and Bloom Carroll Bulldogs
- Website: https://www.fairfieldunion.org/fairfieldunionhighschool_home.aspx

Fairfield Union High School is a public high school in Richland Township, Fairfield County, Ohio, located just west of the village of West Rushville, with an enrollment of 645 students. Fairfield Union High School is the only high school in the Fairfield Union Local Schools district, which consolidates three communities: Bremen, Pleasantville, and Rushville. The school's sports teams are known as the Falcons.

== Eastland-Fairfield Career & Technical School ==
School	Location	Satellite Locations	School Districts	Grades
Eastland-Fairfield Career & Technical School	Eastland: Groveport, Ohio Fairfield: Carrol, Ohio	Lincoln High School; Groveport Madison High School; New Albany High School; Pickerington High School North; Reynoldsburg High School; Canal Winchester High School	16 School Districts	11–12

== Athletics ==
=== Ohio High School Athletic Association state championships ===
- Boys Cross Country — 2024
