= Walnut Township, Fairfield County, Ohio =

Township in Ohio, US

- Township
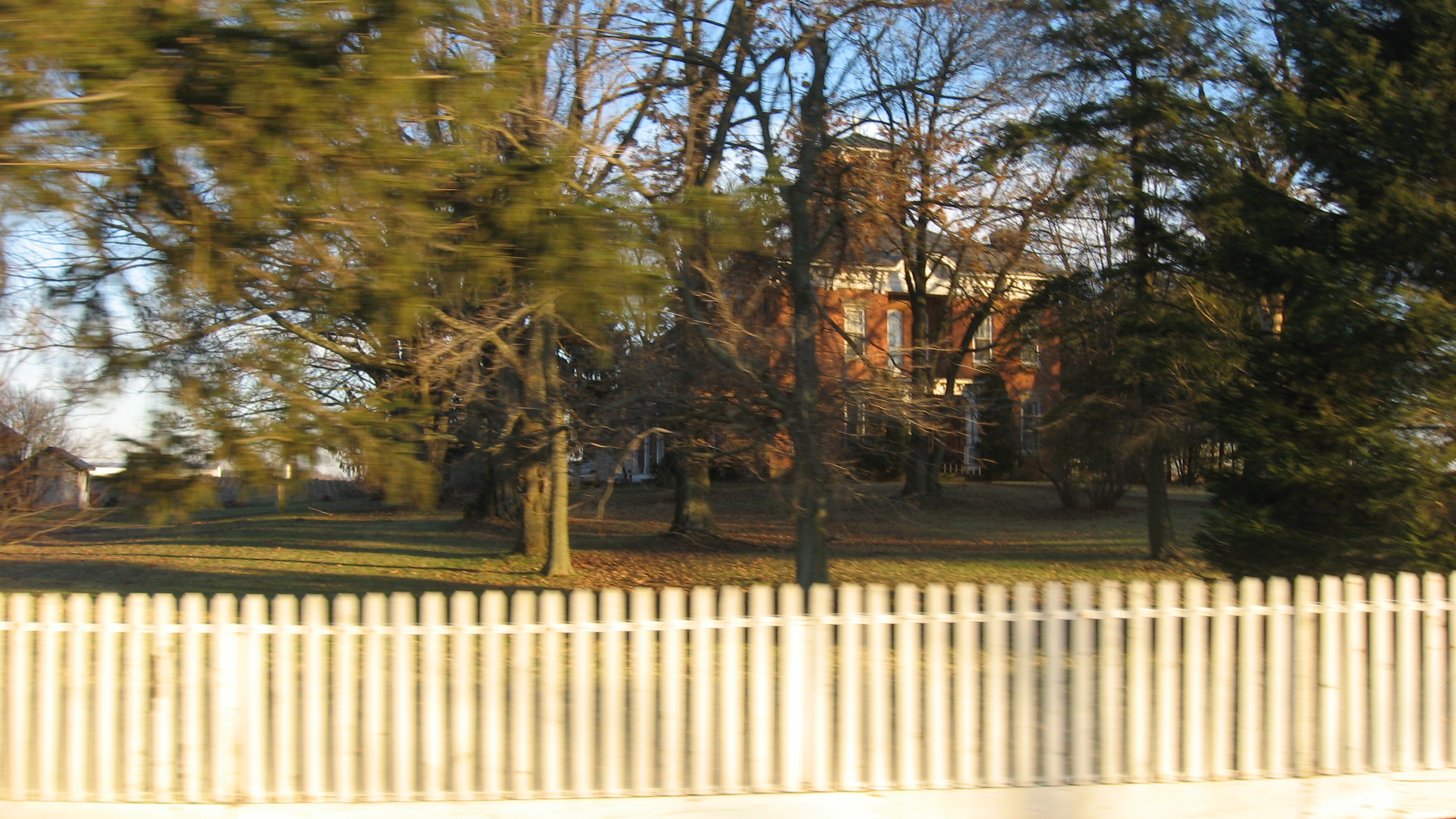
- The John Gill Farmstead, a historic site in the township

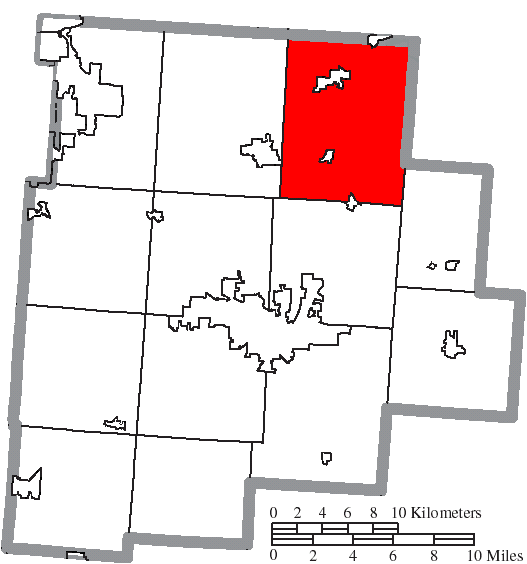
- Location of Walnut Township in Fairfield County
- Coordinates: 39°53′11″N 82°31′25″W
- Country: United States
- State: Ohio
- County: Fairfield

Area
  - Total: 50.4 sq mi (130.6 km^{2})
  - Land: 48.0 sq mi (124.4 km^{2})
  - Water: 2.4 sq mi (6.2 km^{2})
- Elevation: 980 ft (300 m)

Population (2020)
  - Total: 6,673
  - Density: 138.9/sq mi (53.64/km^{2})
- Time zone: UTC-5 (Eastern (EST))
  - Summer (DST): UTC-4 (EDT)
- FIPS code: 39-80570
- GNIS feature ID: 1086085
- Website: www.walnuttwp.com

Walnut Township is one of the thirteen townships of Fairfield County, Ohio, United States. As of the 2020 census the population was 6,673.

== Geography ==
Located in the northeastern corner of the county, it borders the following townships:

- Union Township, Licking County - north
- Thorn Township, Perry County - east
- Richland Township - southeast
- Pleasant Township - south
- Liberty Township - west
- Harrison Township, Licking County - northwest corner

Several populated places are located in Walnut Township:

- Part of the village of Buckeye Lake, in the far north
- The census-designated place of Fairfield Beach, in the northeast
- The village of Millersport, in the north
- Part of the village of Pleasantville, in the far south
- The village of Thurston, in the south

== Name and history ==
Walnut Township was organized in 1807, and named for the groves of walnut trees within its borders. Statewide, other Walnut Townships are located in Gallia and Pickaway counties.

== Government ==
The township is governed by a three-member board of trustees, who are elected in November of odd-numbered years to a four-year term beginning on the following January 1. Two are elected in the year after the presidential election and one is elected in the year before it. There is also an elected township fiscal officer, who serves a four-year term beginning on April 1 of the year after the election, which is held in November of the year before the presidential election. Vacancies in the fiscal officership or on the board of trustees are filled by the remaining trustees.
