= Eastland-Fairfield Career & Technical Schools =

Career & technical school in Ohio

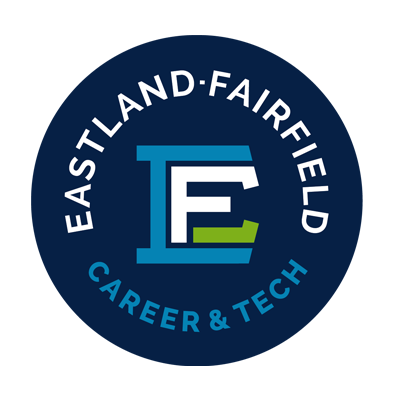

Address
- Eastland: 4465 S Hamilton Rd; Fairfield: 3985 Coonpath Rd NW Eastland: Groveport, Ohio; Fairfield: Carroll, Ohio United States

District information
- Type: Vocational school district
- Grades: 11–12
- Established: Eastland: 1968; Fairfield: 1987
- President: Leo Knoblauch
- Vice-president: Amanda Young
- Superintendent: Shelley Groves
- Asst. superintendent(s): Jennifer Blackstone
- School board: Mary Pierce; Barry Alcock; Dion Manley; Anne Darling Cyphert; Heith Good; Janie Halaiko; Krissy Machamer
- Schools: 2

Students and staff
- Colors

Other information
- Website: www.eastland-fairfield.com

Eastland-Fairfield Career & Technical Schools (EFCTS), formerly Eastland Vocational Center (1968–2001), is a joint career & technical school district in Ohio. It serves 16 school districts in Franklin, Fairfield, and Pickaway counties. It covers an area of 700 square miles (1,813 km^{2}), and is one of the largest career and technical districts geographically in Ohio.

== Programs and courses ==
Eastland-Fairfield has over 35 career and technical programs covering practically every career field.

=== Main campus courses ===
Course	Building
Agriculture & Heavy Equipment	Eastland
Animal Management	Fairfield
Auto Body & Paint	Eastland
Automotive	Eastland & Fairfield
Aviation	Eastland
Construction	Fairfield
Cosmetology	Eastland & Fairfield
Criminal Justice	Eastland & Fairfield
Culinary Arts	Eastland
Electrical	Eastland
Employability Prep	Fairfield & at off-site locations
Firefighting	Eastland
Graphic Design	Eastland
Heating, Ventilation, Air Conditioning and Refrigeration	Fairfield
Interactive Media	Eastland
Medical Office	Eastland
Nail Services	Fairfield
Pharmacy	Fairfield
Pre-Dental	Eastland & Fairfield
Pre-Engineering	Eastland
Pre-Nursing	Fairfield
Programming & Software Development	Eastland
Robotics & Automation	Eastland
STNA	Fairfield
Welding	Eastland

=== Satellite programs ===
Program	School
Architecture/ Construction Management	Lincoln High School, Gahanna, Ohio
Bioscience	Lincoln High School, Gahanna, Ohio
Cyber Security	New Albany High School, New Albany, Ohio
Natural Resource Management	New Albany High School, New Albany, Ohio
Marketing & Logistics Management	Groveport Madison High School, Groverport, Ohio
Multimedia	Pickerington High School North, Violet Township, Ohio
Sports Medicine	Lincoln High School, Gahanna, Ohio & New Albany High School, New Albany, Ohio
Teaching Professions	Lincoln High School, Gahanna, Ohio

=== Offsite programs ===
Program	Location
Project SEARCH	Fairfield Medical Center, 401 N Ewing St, Lancaster, Ohio

== School districts ==
EFCTS serves 16 school districts in Franklin, Fairfield, and Pickaway counties.

- Amanda-Clearcreek High School
- Berne Union High School
- Bexley High School
- Bloom-Carroll High School
- Canal Winchester High School
- Fairfield Union High School
- Gahanna-Jefferson Public Schools
- Groveport Madison High School
- Hamilton Township High School
- Liberty Union High School
- New Albany-Plain Local School District
- Pickerington Local School District
- Reynoldsburg City Schools
- Teays Valley High School
- Millersport High School
- Whitehall-Yearling High School

== Alumni recognition ==
EFCTS recognizes alumni every five years.
