= Carl K. Benhase =

American football player and coach (1929–2018)

Biographical details
- Born: September 5, 1929; Cincinnati, Ohio, U.S.
- Died: February 8, 2018 (aged 88); Loveland, Ohio, U.S.

Playing career
- 1947–1950: Miami (OH)
- Position: Quarterback

Coaching career (HC unless noted)
- 1952: Fort Eustis (backfield)
- 1955: Marion HS (VA) (first assistant)
- 1956–1968: Berne Union HS (OH)
- 1959–1962: Circleville HS (OH)
- 1963: Hanover
- 1964–1969: Portsmouth HS (OH)

Head coaching record
- Overall: 0–9 (college); 77–42–6 (high school)

Carl Kenneth "Benny" Benhase (September 5, 1929 – February 8, 2018) was an American football player and coach. He served as the head football coach at Hanover College in Hanover, Indiana in 1963, compiling a record of 0–9. Benhase played college football at Miami University under head coach Woody Hayes. As a high school football coach in Ohio, he was an early pioneer of the no-huddle offense.

Benhase was born on September 5, 1929, Cincinnati, Ohio, to Henry Francis Benhase and Cora Willish Benhase. He grew up in Deer Park, Ohio, where he graduated from Deer Park High School in 1947. Benhase began his coaching and teaching career in Panama City, Florida before serving in the United States Army during the Korean War. During his military service, he was the backfield coach in 1952 for the All-Army champion football team at Fort Eustis in Newport News, Virginia. Benhase spent the fall of 1955 as the first assistant football coach in charge of the backfield and centers at Marion High School in Marion, Virginia. He earned a master's degree in education from the University of Virginia in 1957. Benhase was the head football coach at Berne Union High School in Sugar Grove, Ohio from 1956 to 1958, compiling a record of 21–3–3 in three seasons. In 1959, he moved on to Circleville High School in Circleville, Ohio, leading the football team to a record of 27–10–2 in five seasons.

Benhase died on February 8, 2018.

== Head coaching record ==
=== College ===
Year	Team	Overall	Conference	Standing	Bowl/playoffs
Hanover Panthers (Hoosier Conference) (1963)
1963	Hanover	0–9	0–5	6th	
Hanover:		0–9	0–5		
Total:		0–9			
