= Colfax, Ohio =

Unincorporated community in Ohio, U.S.

Coordinates: 39°44′25″N 82°30′08″W

Colfax is an unincorporated community in Pleasant Township, Fairfield County, Ohio, United States. It lies at the intersection of U. S. Route 22 and Lake Road. Located in the east of the county, it lies east of Lancaster (the county seat of Fairfield County) and west of Rushville.
