= North Berne, Ohio =

Unincorporated community in Ohio, U.S.

Coordinates: 39°42′20″N 82°29′55″W

North Berne is an unincorporated community in Fairfield County, in the U.S. state of Ohio.

== History ==
A post office was in operation at North Berne between 1856 and 1921. The community derives its name from Berne, in Switzerland, the native land of a large share of the early settlers.
