= Pleasant Township, Fairfield County, Ohio =

Township in Ohio, US

- Township
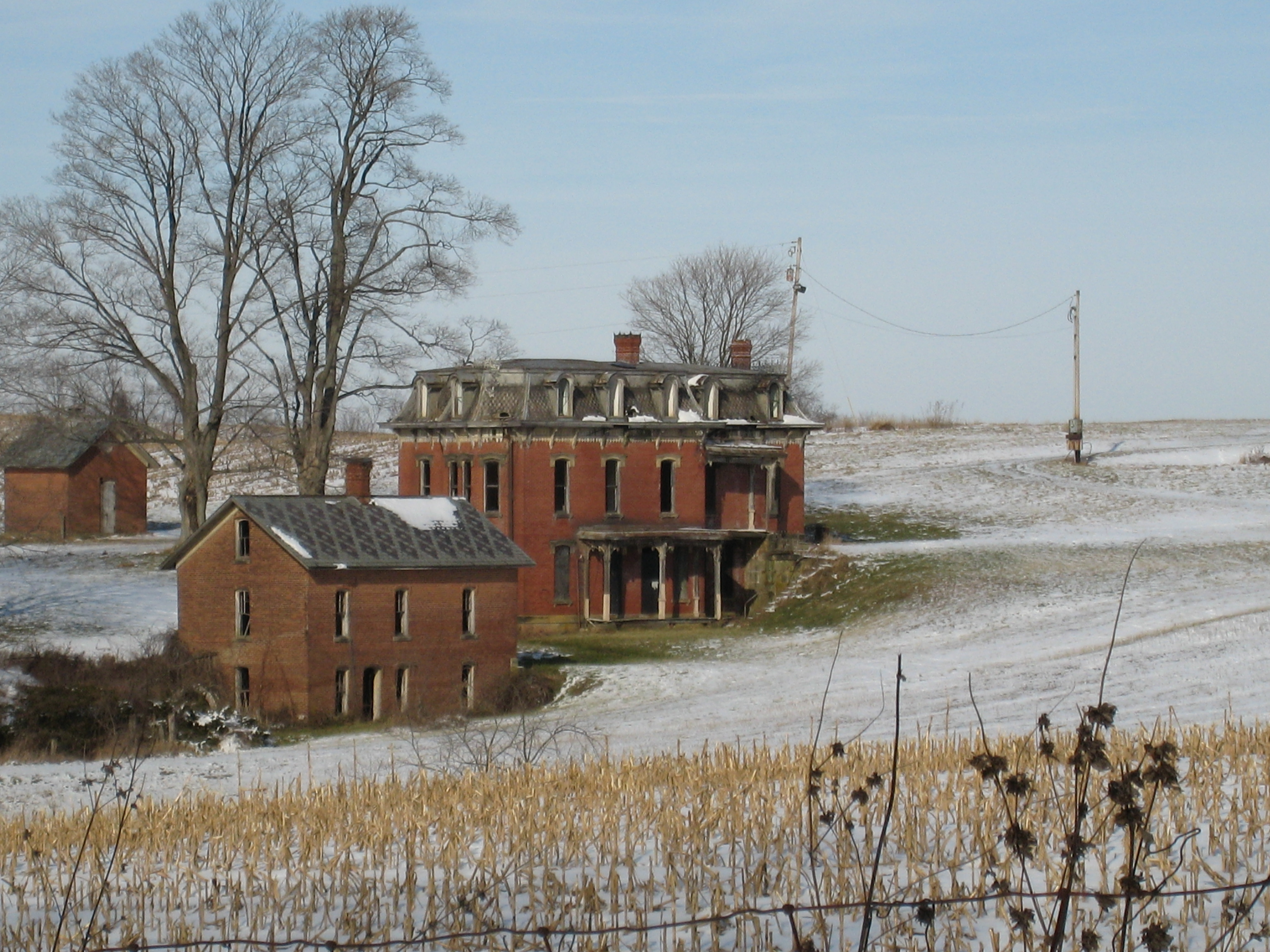
- The Mudhouse Mansion
- Motto: "A place you'll want to call home"
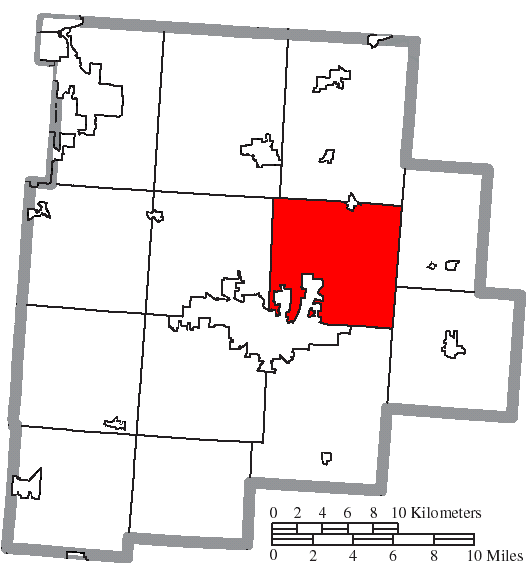
- Location of Pleasant Township in Fairfield County
- Coordinates: 39°45′36″N 82°32′35″W
- Country: United States
- State: Ohio
- County: Fairfield

Area
  - Total: 34.7 sq mi (90.0 km^{2})
  - Land: 34.6 sq mi (89.7 km^{2})
  - Water: 0.12 sq mi (0.3 km^{2})
- Elevation: 1,020 ft (311 m)

Population (2020)
  - Total: 6,181
  - Density: 178/sq mi (68.9/km^{2})
- Time zone: UTC-5 (Eastern (EST))
  - Summer (DST): UTC-4 (EDT)
- FIPS code: 39-63240
- GNIS feature ID: 1086081
- Website: www.pleasanttownship.org

Pleasant Township is one of the thirteen townships of Fairfield County, Ohio, United States. As of the 2020 census the population was 6,181.

== Geography ==
Located in the central part of the county, it borders the following townships:

- Walnut Township - north
- Richland Township - northeast
- Rush Creek Township - southeast
- Berne Township - south
- Hocking Township - southwest corner
- Greenfield Township - west
- Liberty Township - northwest

Parts of two municipalities are located in Pleasant Township: the city of Lancaster, the county seat of Fairfield County, in the southwest; and the village of Pleasantville in the north.

== Name and history ==
Pleasant Township was so named on account of their fertile soil. It is one of fifteen Pleasant Townships statewide.

== Government ==
The township is governed by a three-member board of trustees, who are elected in November of odd-numbered years to a four-year term beginning on the following January 1. Two are elected in the year after the presidential election and one is elected in the year before it. There is also an elected township fiscal officer, who serves a four-year term beginning on April 1 of the year after the election, which is held in November of the year before the presidential election. Vacancies in the fiscal officership or on the board of trustees are filled by the remaining trustees.
