= Fairfield Beach =

Fairfield Beach may refer to:

- Fairfield Beach, Connecticut
- Fairfield Beach, Ohio
