= Greenfield Township, Ohio =

Greenfield Township, Ohio, may refer to:

- Greenfield Township, Fairfield County, Ohio
- Greenfield Township, Gallia County, Ohio
- Greenfield Township, Huron County, Ohio
