= Berne Union High School =

Location
- 506 North Main Street; Sugar Grove, (Fairfield County), Ohio 43155; United States
- Coordinates: 39°37′46″N 82°32′49″W

Information
- Type: Public, Coeducational high school
- Motto: Ut astra scientia (to the stars knowledge)
- Established: 1915
- Status: Open
- School district: Sugar Grove
- Superintendent: Jon Parker
- Principal: Craig Heath
- Grades: 7-12
- Colors: Maroon & gold
- Slogan: Rockets Forever
- Fight song: Fight for Berne Union
- Athletics conference: Mid-State League
- Mascot: Rocket
- Team name: Rockets
- Rival: William V. Fisher Catholic High School
- Newspaper: Orbital
- Website: https://www.buschools.com/high_school

Berne Union High School is a public high school in Sugar Grove, Ohio. It is the only high school in the Berne Union Local Schools district.

== Ohio High School Athletic Association State Championships ==
- Boys Baseball – 1938

== The Berne Union Band program ==
Berne Union's marching band (BUGRMB) competes in Class A and AA in OMEA Adjudicated events. Since 1996, BUGRMB has earned 32 Grand Champion Awards, 39 Reserve Grand Champion Awards, 95 1st in Class, 29 2nd in Class, 65 Best Auxiliary, and 57 Best Percussion Awards. Since 1997 the Berne Union Wind Ensemble has traveled to Toronto (4x) Virginia Beach (2x), St. Louis (3x), Chicago, Gatlinburg, and Dayton/Cincinnati to perform and participate in national and international festivals. The ensemble recently traveled to Paris, France and performed in local venues for Parisian citizens.

== Sports at Berne Union ==
Softball, Girls Basketball, Boys Basketball, Golf, Track, Cross Country, Football, Baseball, Girls Volleyball.

== Eastland-Fairfield Career & Technical School ==
School	Location	Satellite Locations	School Districts	Grades
Eastland-Fairfield Career & Technical Schools	Eastland: Groveport, Ohio Fairfield: Carrol, Ohio	Lincoln High School; Groveport Madison High School; New Albany High School; Pickerington High School North; Reynoldsburg High School; Canal Winchester High School	16 School Districts	11–12
