= Liberty Union High School =

Location
- 500 Washington Street; Baltimore, (Fairfield County), Ohio 43105; United States; 39°50′50″N 82°36′27″W

Information
- Type: Public, coeducational high school
- School district: Liberty Union-Thurston Local Schools
- Superintendent
- Principal: Roger Cade
- Teaching staff: 24.09 (FTE)
- Grades: 9–12
- Student to teacher ratio: 15.23
- Colors: Red and black
- Athletics conference: Mid-State League
- Team name: Lions
- Website: District website

Liberty Union High School is a public high school in Baltimore, Ohio, United States. It is the only high school in the Liberty Union-Thurston Local Schools district. Their teams are known as the Lions. The school colors are red and black. The school is commonly referred to as LU.

The current high school was built in 1988 as an addition to the existing high school, which had been built in the 1950s and was converted to a middle school before it was torn down to make more parking spaces for students and teachers. A new middle school was built in 2011. The original Liberty Union High School held its first graduation exercises in 1917, merging Baltimore and Basil high schools.

== Liberty Union Band ==
The Liberty Union Band program has achieved numerous honors, at both the local and state level. In 2007, under the direction of Joshua Sipe, the Liberty Union Marching Band qualified for OMEA State Marching Band Finals for the first time in school history.

The Liberty Union High School Concert Band has consistently been rated Superior at District and State Adjudicated Events. The Concert Band has performed in Ohio Music Education Association "Class B" since 2011.

== Athletics ==
=== State championships ===
- Boys' baseball – 1960, 1961, 1964
- Girls' track and field – 1988
- Girls' basketball – 1993
- Girls' softball – 2024

== Eastland-Fairfield Career & Technical School ==
School	Location	Satellite locations	School districts	Grades
Eastland-Fairfield Career & Technical School	Eastland: Groveport, Ohio Fairfield: Carrol, Ohio	Lincoln High School; Groveport Madison High School; New Albany High School; Pickerington High School North; Reynoldsburg High School; Canal Winchester High School	16 school districts	11–12

== Notable alumni ==
- Jacob Miller, professional baseball player
- Clint Stickdorn, former professional American football player
