= New Strasburg, Ohio =

Unincorporated community in Ohio, U.S.

Coordinates: 39°39′07″N 82°45′46″W

New Strasburg is an unincorporated community in Fairfield County, in the U.S. state of Ohio.

The community derives its name from the French city of Strasbourg (German: Strassburg).
