= FUHS =

FUHS may refer to:

- Fairfield Union High School, Lancaster, Ohio, United States
- Fallbrook Union High School, Fallbrook, California, United States
- Fullerton Union High School, Fullerton, California, United States
- Finch University of Health Sciences, former name of Rosalind Franklin University of Medicine and Science
