= Hamilton Township High School =

Public high school in Hamilton Township, Ohio, United States

Location
- 1105 Rathmell Road (Hamilton Township, Ohio, (Franklin County) 43207; United States
- Coordinates: 39°51′36″N 82°58′17″W

Information
- Type: Public high school
- Superintendent: Mark Tyler
- Principal: Matt O'Hearn
- Grades: 9-12
- Colors: Green and gold
- Athletics conference: Mid-State League
- Team name: Rangers
- Website: District Website

Hamilton Township High School is a public high school located at 1105 Rathmell Road, near Columbus, Ohio, which serves Hamilton Township, Obetz, Lockbourne, Reese, Shadeville, and parts of south Columbus.

== Ohio High School Athletic Association State Championships ==
- Baseball - 1947

== Eastland-Fairfield Career & Technical School ==
School	Location	Satellite Locations	School Districts	Grades
Eastland-Fairfield Career & Technical School	Eastland: Groveport, Ohio Fairfield: Carrol, Ohio	Lincoln High School; Groveport Madison High School; New Albany High School; Pickerington High School North; Reynoldsburg High School; Canal Winchester High School	16 School Districts	11–12
