= Carlin B. Carpenter =

American athletic director, football coach, and wrestling coach (born 1938)

Biographical details
- Born: c. 1938 or 1939 (age 87–88); Nelsonville, Ohio, U.S.
- Education: Defiance College (1964); Ohio University (1970)

Playing career

Football
- 1960–1963: Defiance

Baseball
- 1962–1963: Defiance
- Positions: Tailback, linebacker (football)

Coaching career (HC unless noted)

Football
- 1964–1965: Nelsonville-York HS (OH) (assistant)
- 1966–1967: Amanda-Clearcreek HS (OH) (assistant)
- 1968–1969: Ohio (GA)
- 1970: Defiance (assistant)
- 1971–1974: Ohio (DL/freshman)
- 1975–1978: Marshall (DC)
- 1979–2002: Bluffton

Wrestling
- 1966–1967: Amanda-Clearcreek HS (OH)
- 1970: Defiance

Administrative career (AD unless noted)
- 1980–2003: Bluffton

Head coaching record
- Overall: 100–127–1 (football)
- Tournaments: 1–2 (NAIA D-II playoffs)

Accomplishments and honors

Championships
- 1 AMC (1994); 1 HCAC (2000)

Carlin B. "Jeep" Carpenter (born c. 1938) is an American former college athletic director, college football coach, and wrestling coach. He was the head football coach for Bluffton College—now known as Bluffton University—from 1979 to 2002.

== Playing career ==
Carpenter attended Nelsonville-York High School and played high school football as a quarterback. He played college football for Defiance as a tailback and linebacker. He also played baseball.

== Coaching career ==
In 1964, Carpenter began his coaching career as an assistant coach for his alma mater, Nelsonville-York High School. He coached for Amanda-Clearcreek High School in 1966. In 1968, Carpenter was hired as a graduate assistant for Ohio under head coach Bill Hess. In 1970, he joined his college alma mater, Defiance, as an assistant coach under head coach Roger Merb. He returned to Ohio the following year as the defensive line coach and head football coach for the freshman team. In 1975, he joined fellow Ohio assistant coach Frank Ellwood as his defensive coordinator when he was hired as head coach for Marshall. In 1979, Carpenter earned his first head coaching job as the head coach for Bluffton. In 25 years with the school he led them to a 100–127–1 overall record. He won two conference championships with the team in 1994 and 2000. They also made two trips to the NAIA Division II playoffs and won a playoff game in 1988. He retired following the 2002 season.

In 1966, Carpenter was the head wrestling coach for Amana-Clearcreek High School. In 1970, he was hired as the head wrestling coach for Defiance.

== Military career and athletic director career ==
Following Carpenter's high school graduation from Nelsonville-York High School, he served in the United States Navy for four years.

From 1980 to 2003, Carpenter served as the athletic director for Bluffton.

== Head coaching record ==
=== Football ===
Year	Team	Overall	Conference	Standing	Bowl/playoffs	NAIA D2^{#}
Bluffton Beavers (Hoosier–Buckeye Conference) (1979–1985)
1979	Bluffton	3–6	3–5	T–6th		
1980	Bluffton	2–6–1	2–6	T–6th		
1981	Bluffton	0–9	0–8	9th		
1982	Bluffton	3–6	3–5	T–6th		
1983	Bluffton	0–9	0–7	8th		
1984	Bluffton	2–7	0–6	7th		
1985	Bluffton	8–1	5–1	2nd		11
Bluffton Beavers (NAIA Division II independent) (1986–1989)
1986	Bluffton	6–3				
1987	Bluffton	8–2			L NAIA Division II First Round	10
1988	Bluffton	9–2			L NAIA Division II Quarterfinal	13
1989	Bluffton	6–3				
Bluffton Beavers (NCAA Division III independent) (1990)
1990	Bluffton	6–3				
Bluffton Beavers (Association of Mideast Colleges) (1991–1995)
1991	Bluffton	1–8	0–3	4th		
1992	Bluffton	1–8	1–2	3rd		
1993	Bluffton	3–7	0–3	4th		
1994	Bluffton	4–5	2–1	T–1st		
1995	Bluffton	5–5	1–2	T–2nd		
Bluffton Beavers (NCAA Division III independent) (1996–1997)
1996	Bluffton	2–8				
1997	Bluffton	4–6				
Bluffton Beavers (Heartland Collegiate Athletic Conference) (1998–2002)
1998	Bluffton	5–5	4–3	T–3rd		
1999	Bluffton	7–3	4–3	4th		
2000	Bluffton	7–3	5–1	T–1st		
2001	Bluffton	5–5	4–2	T–3rd		
2002	Bluffton	3–7	1–5	T–6th		
Bluffton:		100–127–1	35–63			
Total:		100–127–1				
National championship Conference title Conference division title or championship game berth
