= Cedar Hill, Ohio =

Coordinates: 39°41′24″N 82°48′19″W

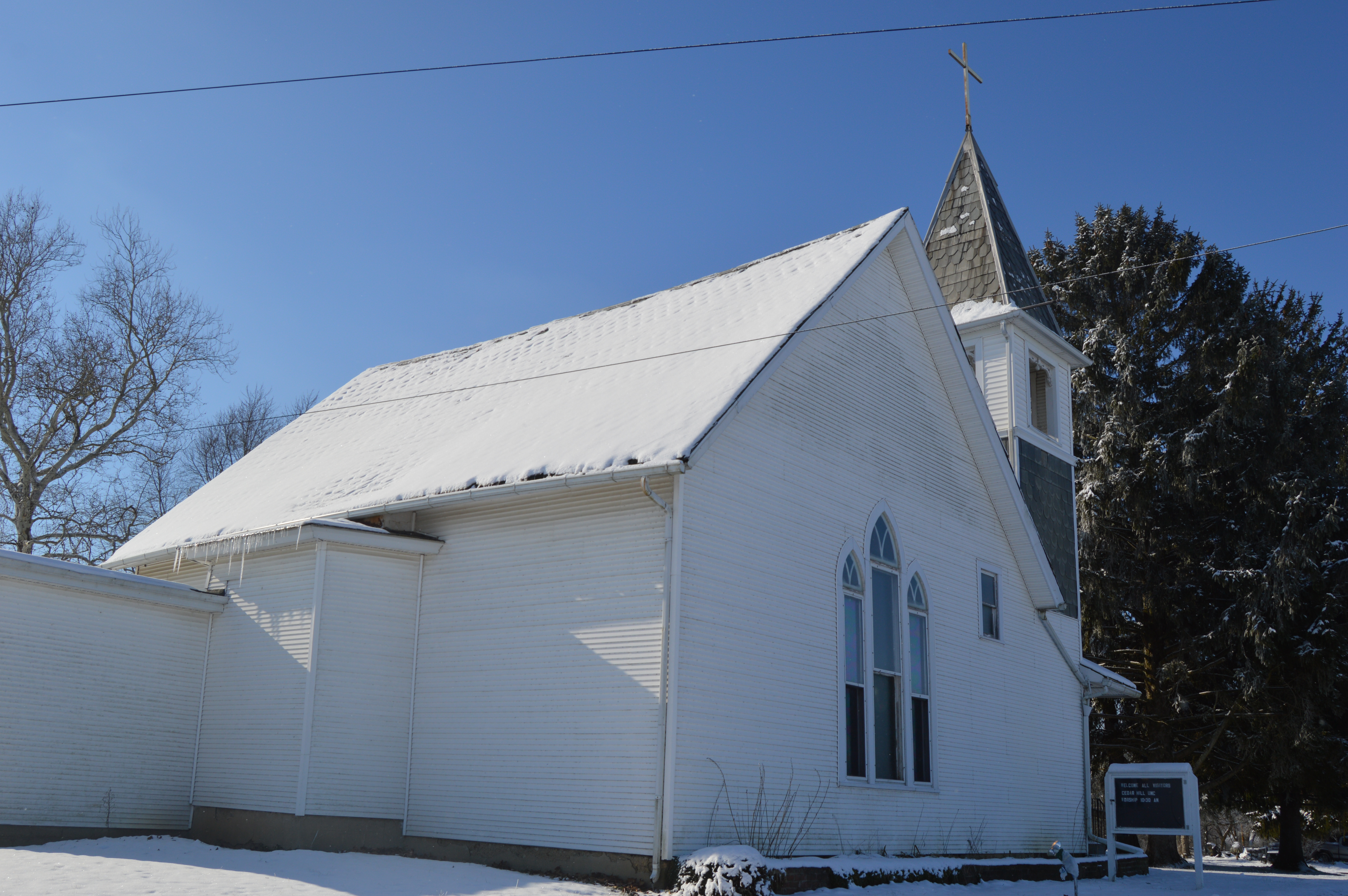
Cedar Hill United Methodist Church

Cedar Hill is an unincorporated community in northern Amanda Township, Fairfield County, Ohio, United States. It lies at the intersection of Lancaster-Circleville (SR-188), Cedar Hill, and Westfall Roads. Located in the west of the county, it lies west of Lancaster (the county seat of Fairfield County) and south of the village of Lithopolis.
