= Havensport, Ohio =

Unincorporated community in Ohio, U.S.

Coordinates: 39°48′36″N 82°40′23″W

Havensport is an unincorporated community in Fairfield County, in the U.S. state of Ohio.

== History ==
Havensport was platted in 1831 by Isaac Havens when the canal was extended to that point.
