= Bloom Township, Fairfield County, Ohio =

Township in Ohio, US

- Township
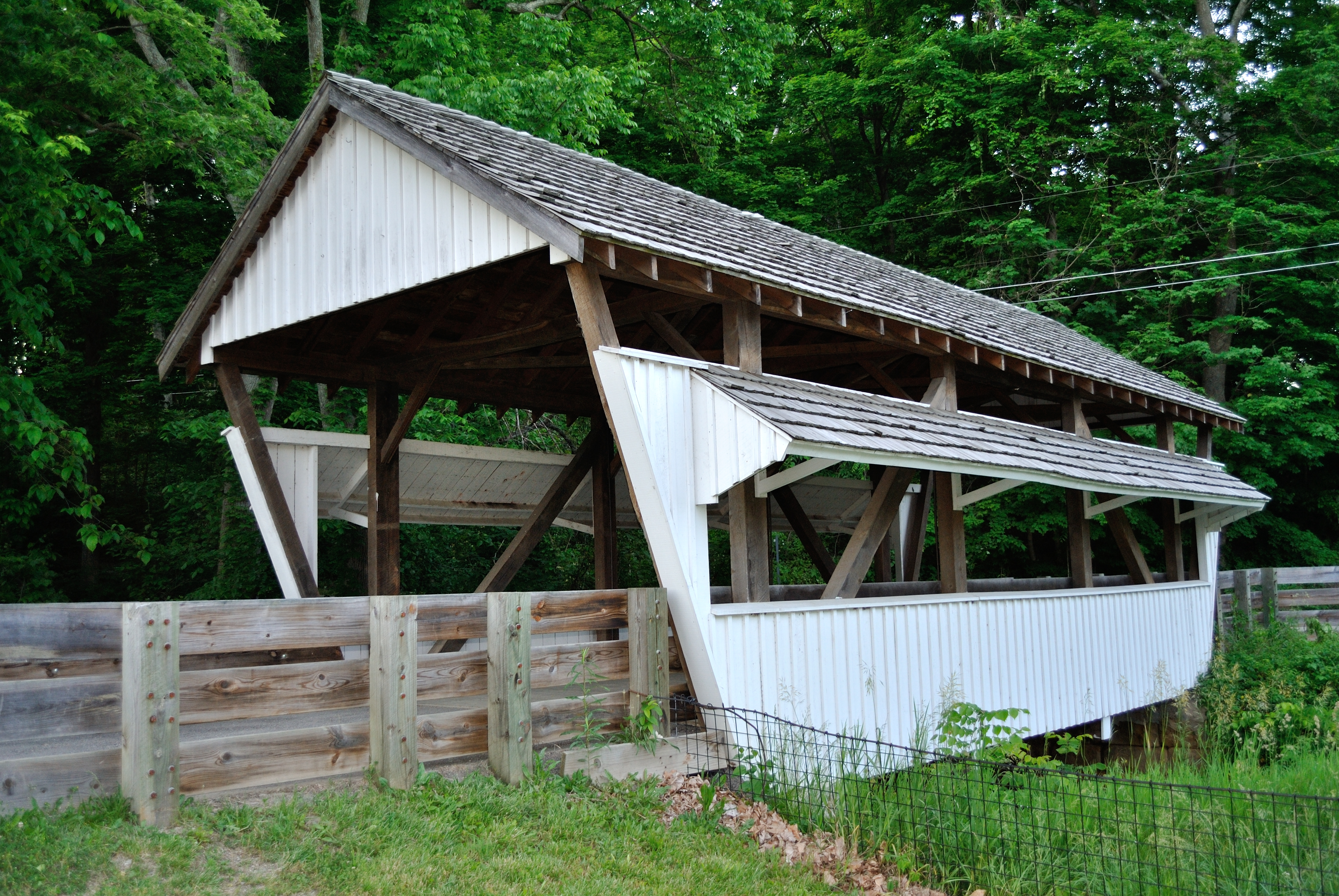
- Rock Mill Covered Bridge

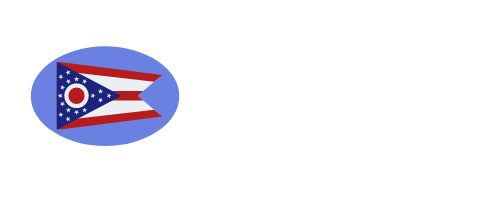
- Logo

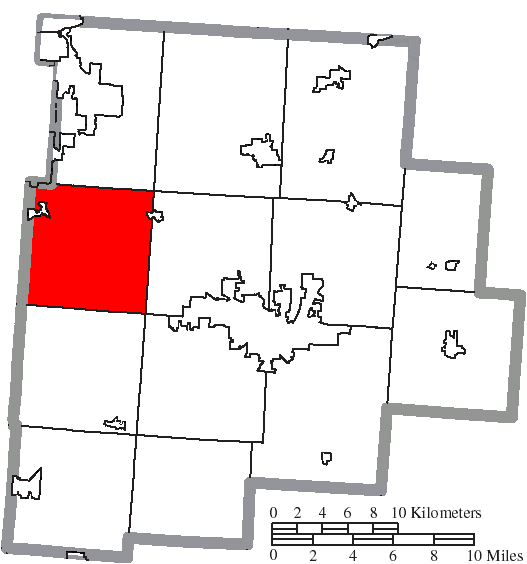
- Location of Bloom Township in Fairfield County
- Coordinates: 39°47′6″N 82°44′58″W
- Country: United States
- State: Ohio
- County: Fairfield

Area
  - Total: 37.2 sq mi (96.4 km^{2})
  - Land: 37.1 sq mi (96.2 km^{2})
  - Water: 0.077 sq mi (0.2 km^{2})
- Elevation: 1,096 ft (334 m)

Population (2020)
  - Total: 10,159
  - Density: 274/sq mi (106/km^{2})
- Time zone: UTC-5 (Eastern (EST))
  - Summer (DST): UTC-4 (EDT)
- FIPS code: 39-06950
- GNIS feature ID: 1086074
- Website: www.bloomtwp.org

Bloom Township is one of the thirteen townships of Fairfield County, Ohio, United States. As of the 2020 census the population was 10,159.

== Geography ==
Located in the western part of the county, it borders the following townships:

- Violet Township - north
- Liberty Township - northeast corner
- Greenfield Township - east
- Hocking Township - southeast corner
- Amanda Township - south
- Walnut Township, Pickaway County - southwest corner
- Madison Township, Pickaway County - west
- Madison Township, Franklin County - northwest

Portions of three villages are located in Bloom Township: a part of Carroll in the northeast, and most of Lithopolis plus a small portion of Canal Winchester in the northwest.

== Name and history ==
Statewide, other Bloom Townships are located in Morgan, Scioto, Seneca, and Wood counties.

Bloom Township was established in 1805. It is the location of the Old Maid's Orchard Mound, a burial mound constructed by the Adena culture; it lies within Chestnut Ridge Metro Park, in the northern part of the township.

== Government ==
The township is governed by a three-member board of trustees, who are elected in November of odd-numbered years to a four-year term beginning on the following January 1. Two are elected in the year after the presidential election and one is elected in the year before it. There is also an elected township fiscal officer, who serves a four-year term beginning on April 1 of the year after the election, which is held in November of the year before the presidential election. Vacancies in the fiscal officership or on the board of trustees are filled by the remaining trustees.

=== Bloom Township Officials ===
Office	Officeholder	Party
Trustee	Carol Moore	Non-partisan
Trustee	Brian Randles	Non-partisan
Trustee	Jason Smith	Non-partisan
Fiscal officer	Holly Mattei	Non-partisan
