= Fairfield Beach, Ohio =

- Census-designated place
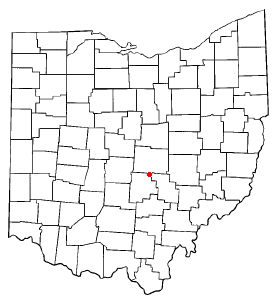
- Location of Fairfield Beach, Ohio
- Coordinates: 39°55′06″N 82°28′45″W
- Country: United States
- State: Ohio
- County: Fairfield
- Township: Walnut

Area
  - Total: 0.98 sq mi (2.53 km^{2})
  - Land: 0.66 sq mi (1.70 km^{2})
  - Water: 0.32 sq mi (0.83 km^{2})
- Elevation: 909 ft (277 m)

Population (2020)
  - Total: 1,267
  - Density: 1,934/sq mi (746.8/km^{2})
- Time zone: UTC-5 (Eastern (EST))
  - Summer (DST): UTC-4 (EDT)
- FIPS code: 39-26110
- GNIS feature ID: 2392993

Fairfield Beach is an unincorporated community and census-designated place (CDP) in Fairfield County, Ohio, United States. The population was 1,267 at the 2020 census.

== Geography ==
Fairfield Beach is located in the northeast corner of Walnut Township and Fairfield County on the south shore of Buckeye Lake. The northern border of the CDP is the Licking County line.

Fairfield Beach is 4 miles (6 km) northwest of Thornville, 5 miles (8 km) northeast of Millersport, and 33 miles (53 km) east of downtown Columbus. The village of Buckeye Lake is directly across the lake from Fairfield Beach, about 1 mile (1.6 km) by boat but 11 miles (18 km) by road.

According to the United States Census Bureau, the CDP has a total area of 0.97 square miles (2.5 km^{2}), of which 0.66 square miles (1.7 km^{2}) is land and 0.31 square miles (0.8 km^{2}), or 32.52%, is water.

== Demographics ==
Historical population
Census	Pop.	Note	%±
2020	1,267		—
U.S. Decennial Census

As of the census of 2000, there were 1,163 people, 470 households, and 321 families residing in the CDP. The population density was 1,795.7 inhabitants per square mile (693.3/km^{2}). There were 560 housing units at an average density of 864.7 per square mile (333.9/km^{2}). The racial makeup of the CDP was 97.68% White, 0.17% African American, 0.26% Native American, 0.09% Pacific Islander, 0.09% from other races, and 1.72% from two or more races. Hispanic or Latino of any race were 0.26% of the population.

There were 470 households, out of which 30.2% had children under the age of 18 living with them, 54.7% were married couples living together, 9.6% had a female householder with no husband present, and 31.5% were non-families. 27.0% of all households were made up of individuals, and 12.3% had someone living alone who was 65 years of age or older. The average household size was 2.47 and the average family size was 2.96.

In the CDP the population was spread out, with 25.8% under the age of 18, 5.3% from 18 to 24, 28.6% from 25 to 44, 26.9% from 45 to 64, and 13.3% who were 65 years of age or older. The median age was 39 years. For every 100 females there were 106.6 males. For every 100 females age 18 and over, there were 99.3 males.

The median income for a household in the CDP was $33,882, and the median income for a family was $35,625. Males had a median income of $37,898 versus $25,677 for females. The per capita income for the CDP was $16,486. About 3.6% of families and 6.3% of the population were below the poverty line, including 7.3% of those under age 18 and 12.5% of those age 65 or over.
