= Millersport High School =

Millersport Jr./Sr. High School

Location
- 11850 Lancaster Street; Millersport, (Fairfield County), Ohio 43046; United States
- Coordinates: 39°53′37″N 82°32′0″W

Information
- Type: Public high school
- Grades: 6-12
- Colors: Purple and gold
- Song: Alma Mater
- Fight song: Victory March
- Athletics conference: Mid-State League
- Team name: Lakers
- Website: https://www.walnuttsd.org/schools/millersport_jr_sr_high

Millersport Jr./Sr. High School is a public high school in Millersport, Ohio, United States. It is the only high school in the Walnut Township Local School District. The school's nickname is the Lakers.

== Notable alumni ==
- Roman Atwood (2001) – YouTube prankster
