= Liberty Township, Fairfield County, Ohio =

Township in Ohio, US

- Township
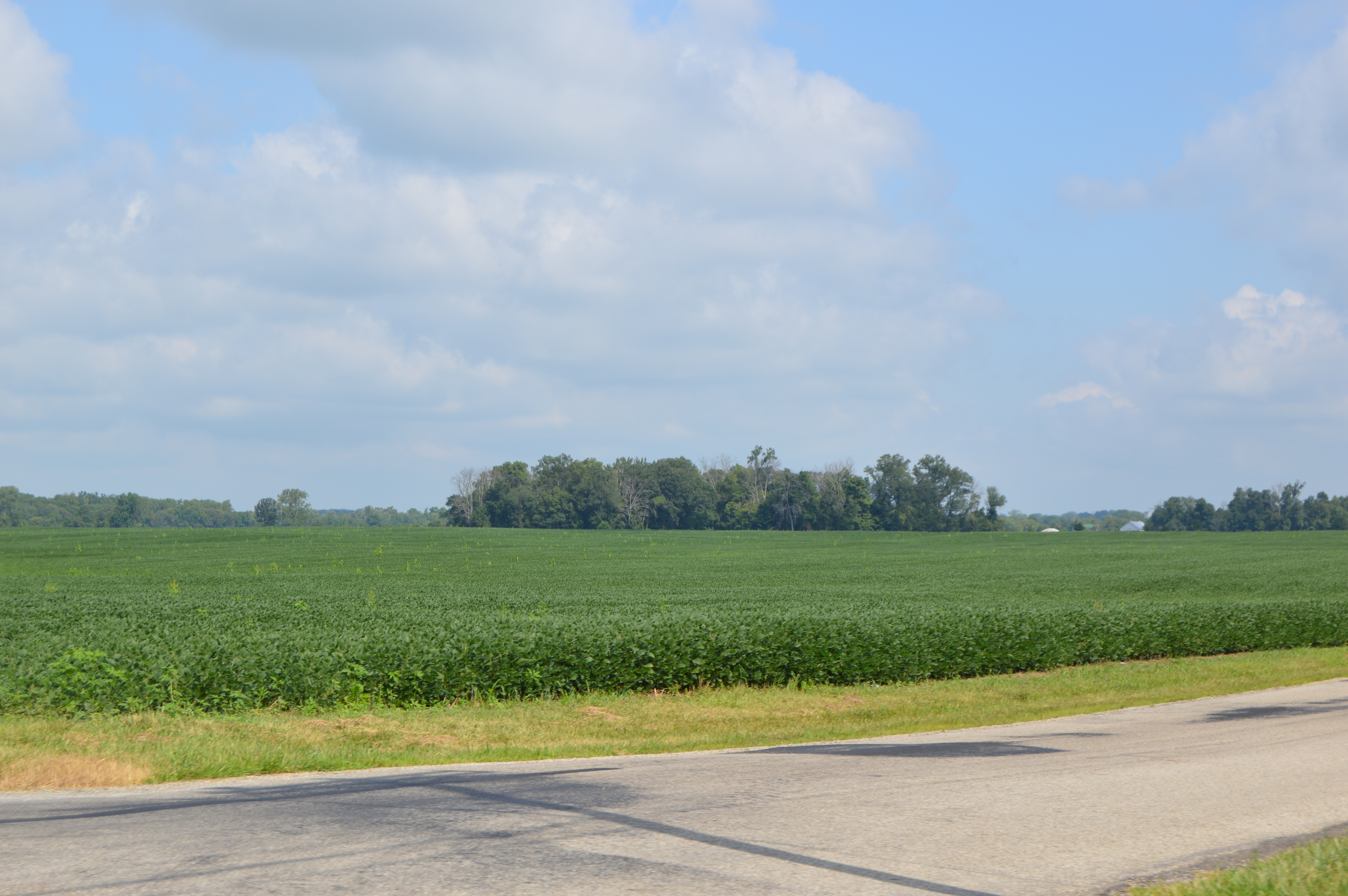
- Fields west of Baltimore

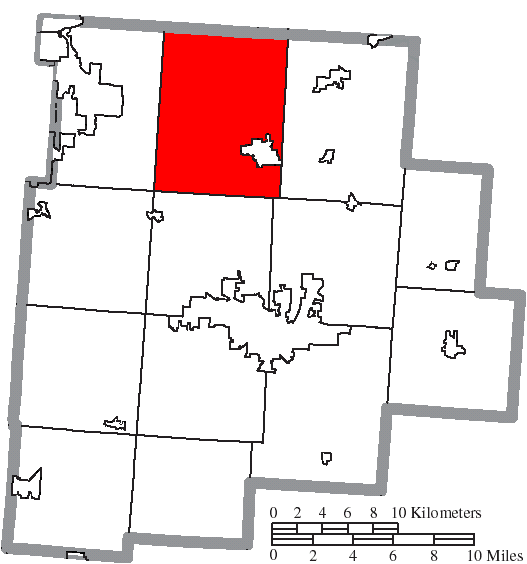
- Location of Liberty Township in Fairfield County
- Coordinates: 39°52′25″N 82°38′10″W
- Country: United States
- State: Ohio
- County: Fairfield

Area
  - Total: 50.3 sq mi (130.4 km^{2})
  - Land: 50.3 sq mi (130.4 km^{2})
  - Water: 0 sq mi (0.0 km^{2})
- Elevation: 909 ft (277 m)

Population (2020)
  - Total: 8,214
  - Density: 163.1/sq mi (62.99/km^{2})
- Time zone: UTC-5 (Eastern (EST))
  - Summer (DST): UTC-4 (EDT)
- FIPS code: 39-43120
- GNIS feature ID: 1086079
- Website: llibertytownshipfairfieldco.org

Liberty Township is one of the thirteen townships of Fairfield County, Ohio, United States. As of the 2020 census the population was 8,214.

== Geography ==
Located in the northern part of the county, it borders the following townships:

- Harrison Township, Licking County - north
- Union Township, Licking County - northeast corner
- Walnut Township - east
- Pleasant Township - southeast
- Greenfield Township - south
- Bloom Township - southwest corner
- Violet Township - west
- Etna Township, Licking County - northwest

The village of Baltimore is located in southeastern Liberty Township.

== Name and history ==
Liberty Township was named after the philosophical concept of liberty. It is one of twenty-five Liberty Townships statewide.

== Government ==
The township is governed by a three-member board of trustees, who are elected in November of odd-numbered years to a four-year term beginning on the following January 1. Two are elected in the year after the presidential election and one is elected in the year before it. There is also an elected township fiscal officer, who serves a four-year term beginning on April 1 of the year after the election, which is held in November of the year before the presidential election. Vacancies in the fiscal officership or on the board of trustees are filled by the remaining trustees.
