= Amanda-Clearcreek High School =

- Amanda School
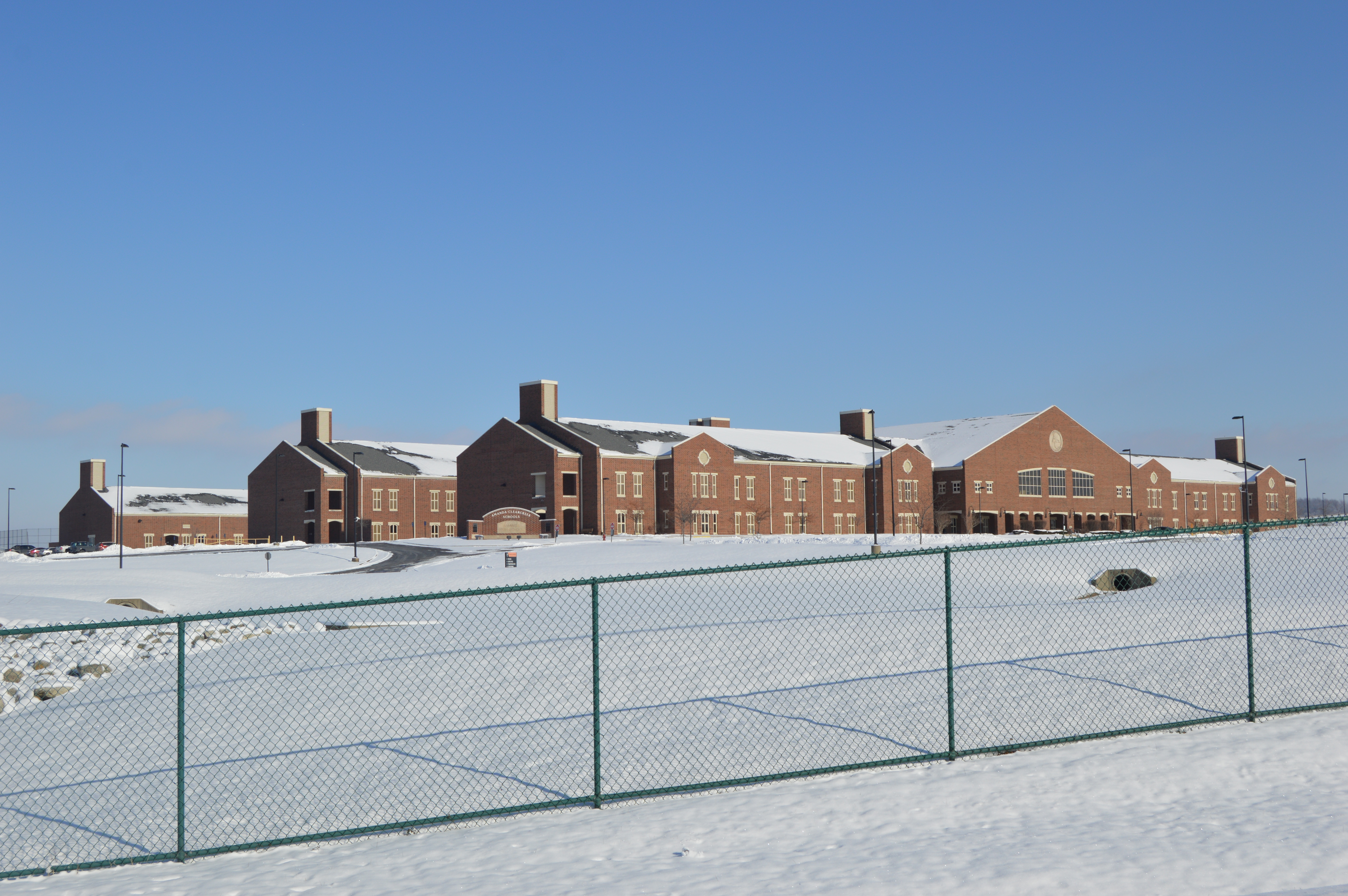
- Overview from Main Street

Location
- 328 East Main Street; Amanda, Ohio; Amanda, (Fairfield County), Ohio 43102; United States; 39°38′59″N 82°44′6″W

Information
- Type: Public, Coeducational high school
- Motto: Academic Commitment to Excellence and Success
- School district: Amanda-Clearcreek
- Superintendent: Timothy R. Edwards, ED. D.
- Principal: Billy Dennis
- Teaching staff: 24.50 (FTE)
- Grades: 9-12
- Average class size: 130 students
- Student to teacher ratio: 17.47
- Campus: Located at 328 East Main Street Amanda, OH 43102 the high school houses grades 3-12
- Colors: Black, Orange and White
- Fight song: Caisson Song
- Athletics conference: Mid-State League Buckeye Division
- Sports: Girls Soccer, Boys Soccer, Golf, Swimming, Cross Country, Baseball, Softball, Track, Tennis, Volleyball, Wrestling, Girls Basketball, Boys Basketball, Cheerleading, and Football
- Mascot: Ace
- Team name: Aces
- Website: School website

Amanda-Clearcreek High School is a public high school in Amanda, Ohio. It is the only high school in the Amanda-Clearcreek Local School District. The school nickname is the Aces.

== Athletics ==
=== Ohio High School Athletic Association State Championships ===
- Boys Football – 1999, 2000

=== Ohio High School Athletic Association State Runners-Up ===
- Boys Cross Country - 1980, 1982
- Boys Football - 1997, 2003, 2004

=== Mid-State League Championships ===
- Boys Cross Country - 1979, 1980, 1981, 1982, 1983, 1984, 1990, 1991, 1992
- Girls Cross Country - 1991, 1993, 1995, 1997, 1998

== Music program ==
The high school music program includes choir, jazz band, concert band, marching band, and flag corps.

The high school marching band attends several performances yearly including all football games, the Amanda Firefighter's festival parade, the Sweet Corn Festival parade, the Pumpkin Show Parade of Bands, and the Parade of Bands at the Fairfield County Fair. Every four years the band performs in a parade at Walt Disney World in Orlando, Florida.

The concert and jazz bands and the choir perform in three concerts a year which include their Christmas, winter, and spring concerts. Concert band members and choir members may audition to attend all-county band and choir performances that occur in the winter every year.

== Eastland-Fairfield Career & Technical School ==
School	Location	Satellite Locations	School Districts	Grades
Eastland-Fairfield Career & Technical Schools	Eastland: Groveport, Ohio Fairfield: Carrol, Ohio	Lincoln High School; Groveport Madison High School; New Albany High School; Pickerington High School North; Reynoldsburg High School; Canal Winchester High School	16 School Districts	11–12
