= Hamburg, Fairfield County, Ohio =

Unincorporated community in Ohio, U.S.

Coordinates: 39°39′07″N 82°39′39″W

Hamburg is an unincorporated community and census-designated place in Fairfield County, in the U.S. state of Ohio.

== History ==
Hamburg was laid out around 1812 on the Zane's Trace. The community was named after the German city of Hamburg. A post office called Hamburg was established in 1859, and remained in operation until 1905.
