= Mudhouse Mansion =

Demolished mansion in Ohio, US

Coordinates: 39.7551°N 82.5058°W

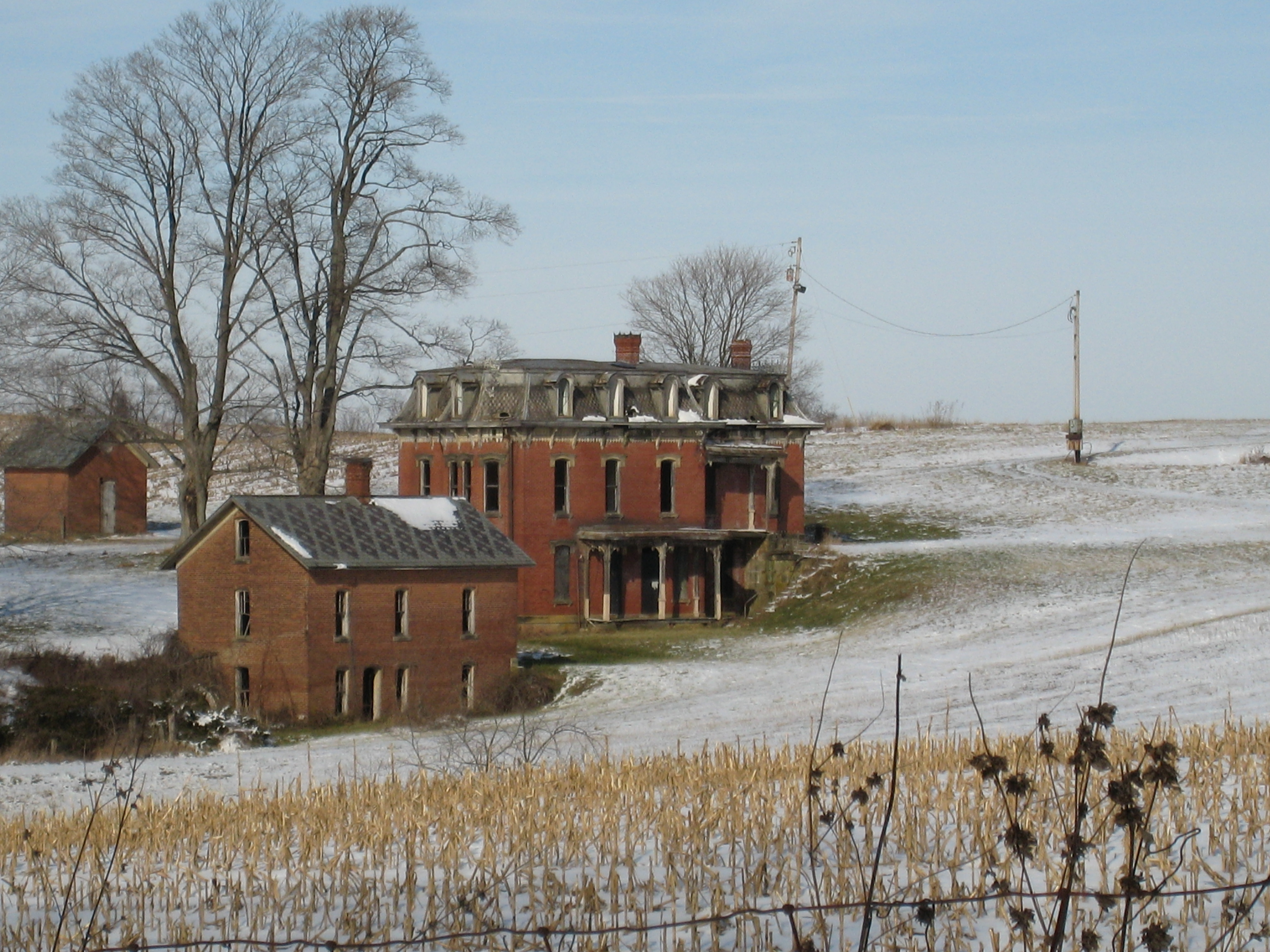
Exterior shot of the Mudhouse Mansion.

Mudhouse Mansion was located in Fairfield County, Ohio, United States, just east of the city of Lancaster. It was variously said to have been built sometime between 1840 and 1850, in the 1870s, or around 1900; the Second Empire style makes the 1870s seem most likely. It was demolished September 21, 2015.

In 1839 or 1852 (year uncertain), Christian and Eleanor Rugh purchased the property from Abraham Kagy and Henry Byler. In 1919, the property was sold to Henry and Martha Hartman. Henry Hartman died in 1930 and the property was inherited by his daughter Lulu Hartman, who married Oren Mast. Her descendants still own the land today, and locally the home was long known as the "Hartman Place". The same building is described as the "Rugh-Mast" house in the book Heritage of Architecture and Arts, Fairfield County, Ohio by Ruth W. Drinkle.

== Ghostlore ==
Like many abandoned properties, it had developed a reputation as a haunted house. Among the ghostlore: after the Civil War, a government official still kept slaves, locking them up at night. One night, one of the slaves dug himself free and killed the entire family (although Ohio was not considered a slave state). Another story sets the mass murder or mass suicide (by hanging) of a more recent family there. Still, other local yarns assert that the house is the original home of the Bloody Mary of children's lore, and that the house was haunted by a woman who killed her children, or by a woman whose husband killed their children, or by all of the parties involved in the tragedy.

In 2015, the Mudhouse Mansion was demolished by the property owners, the Mast family.
