= Greenfield Township, Fairfield County, Ohio =

Township in Ohio, US

- Township
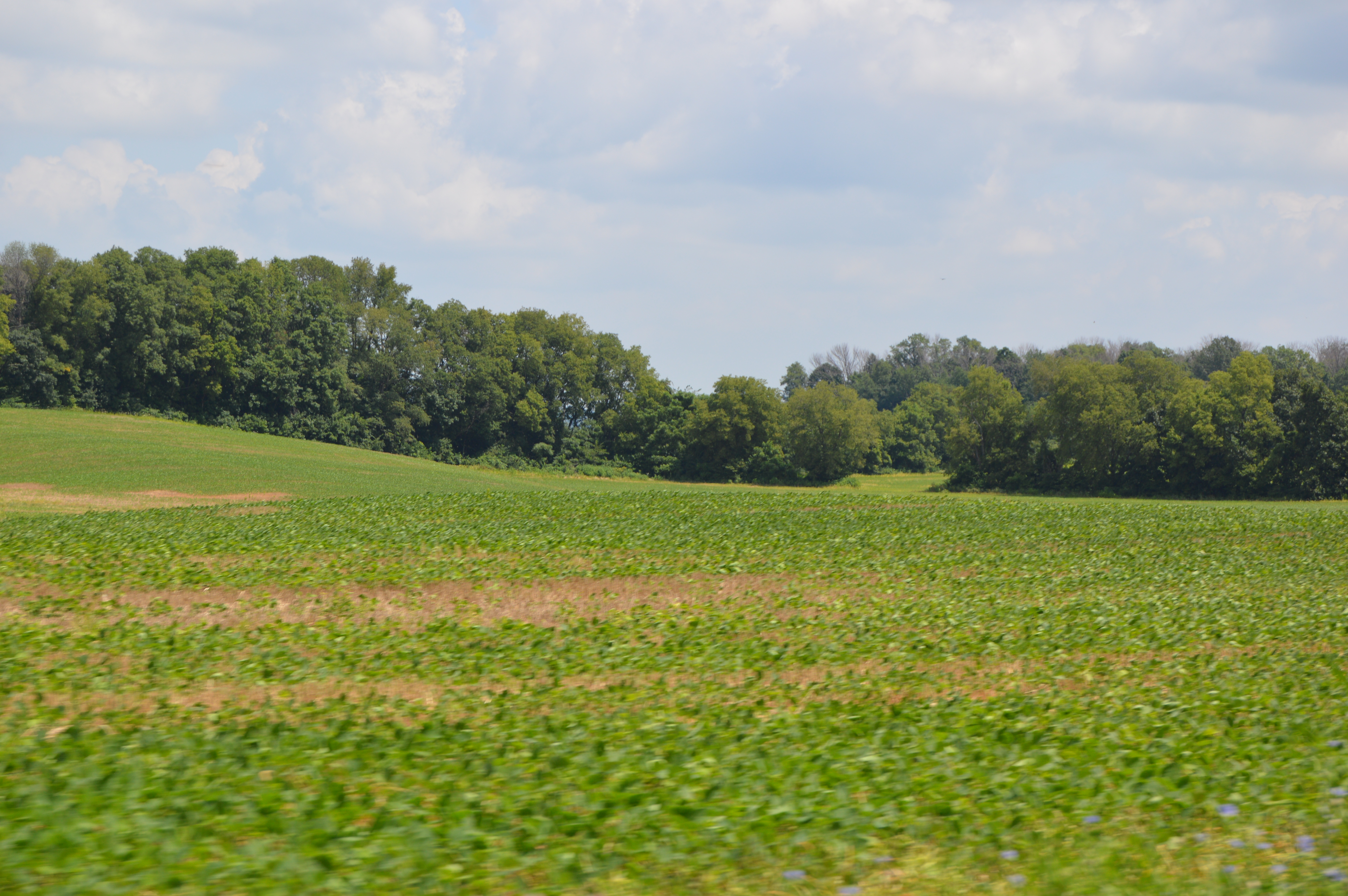
- Green fields of soybeans on Lithopolis Road
- Motto: "A perfect place to raise a family"
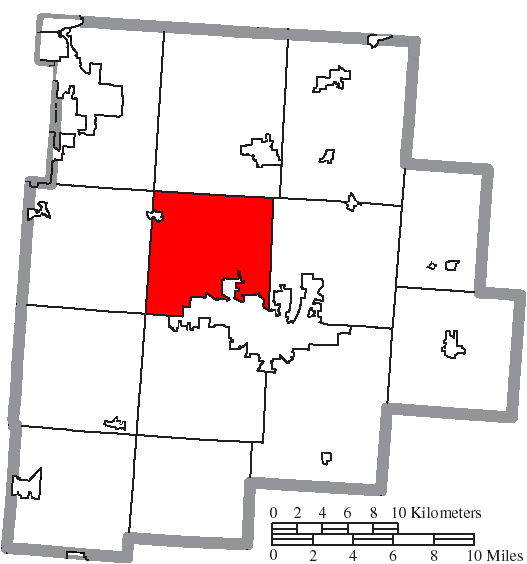
- Location of Greenfield Township in Fairfield County
- Coordinates: 39°46′46″N 82°40′14″W
- Country: United States
- State: Ohio
- County: Fairfield

Area
  - Total: 31.6 sq mi (81.9 km^{2})
  - Land: 31.5 sq mi (81.6 km^{2})
  - Water: 0.12 sq mi (0.3 km^{2})
- Elevation: 873 ft (266 m)

Population (2020)
  - Total: 5,745
  - Density: 182/sq mi (70.4/km^{2})
- Time zone: UTC-5 (Eastern (EST))
  - Summer (DST): UTC-4 (EDT)
- FIPS code: 39-32060
- GNIS feature ID: 1086076
- Website: www.greenfieldtwp.org

Greenfield Township is one of the thirteen townships of Fairfield County, Ohio, United States. As of the 2020 census the population was 5,745.

== Geography ==
Located in the central part of the county, it borders the following townships:

- Liberty Township - north
- Pleasant Township - east
- Berne Township - southeast corner
- Hocking Township - south
- Amanda Township - southwest corner
- Bloom Township - west
- Violet Township - northwest corner

Parts of two municipalities are located in Greenfield Township: the city of Lancaster, the county seat of Fairfield County, in the southeast; and the village of Carroll in the northwest.

== Name and history ==
Greenfield Township was established in 1805, and named for the green fields within its borders. Statewide, other Greenfield Townships are located in Gallia and Huron counties.

== Government ==
The township is governed by a three-member board of trustees, who are elected in November of odd-numbered years to a four-year term beginning on the following January 1. Two are elected in the year after the presidential election and one is elected in the year before it. There is also an elected township fiscal officer, who serves a four-year term beginning on April 1 of the year after the election, which is held in November of the year before the presidential election. Vacancies in the fiscal officership or on the board of trustees are filled by the remaining trustees.

== Notable residents ==
- Jacob R. Brandt, bridge builder in the area who lived in the 1800s
