= Violet Township, Fairfield County, Ohio =

Township in Ohio, US

- Township
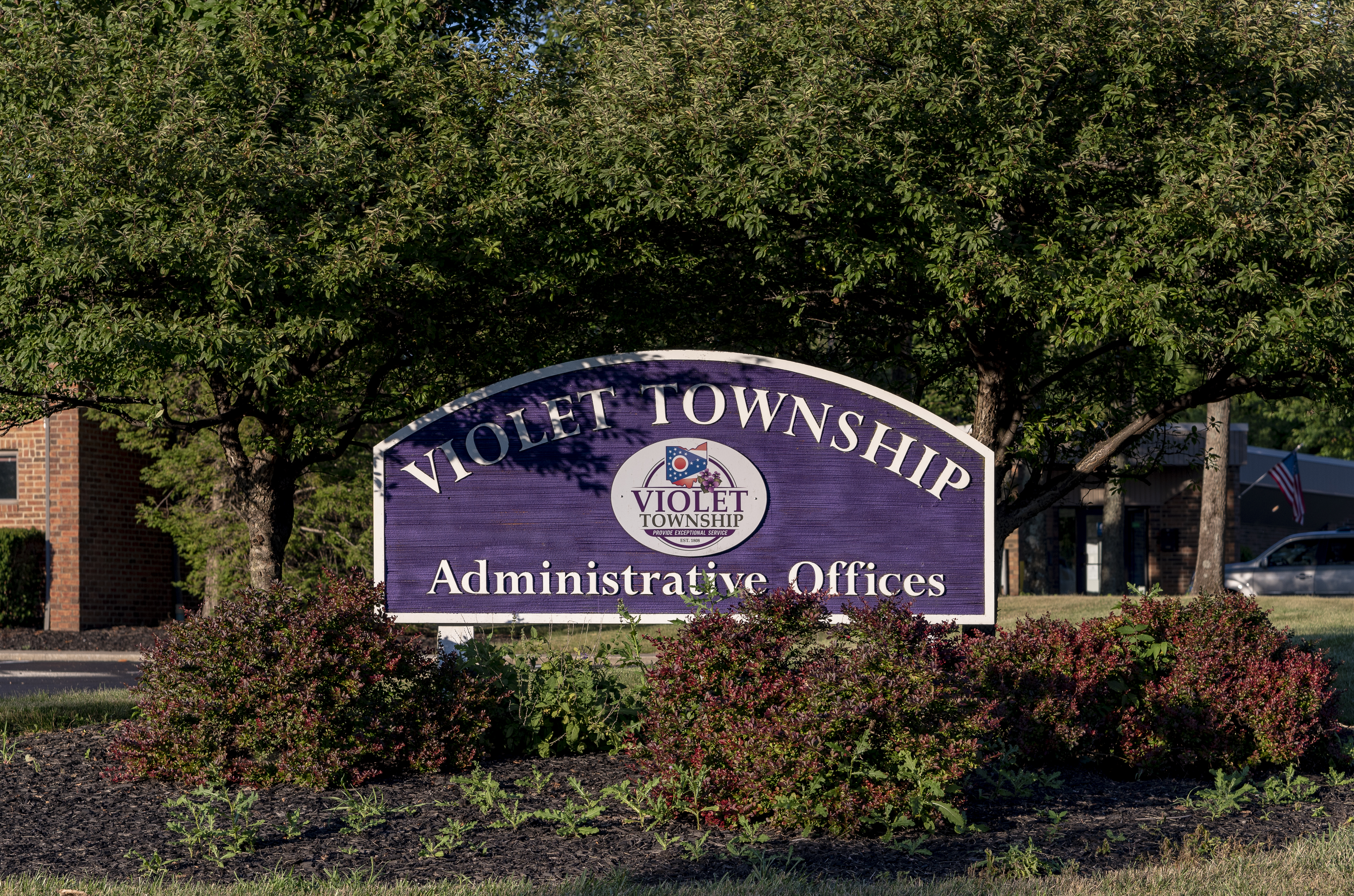
- Administrative Offices Sign
- Motto: "A great place to grow your family or business"
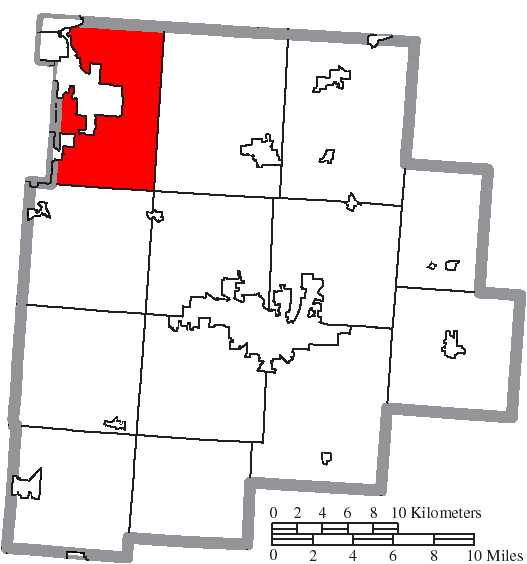
- Location of Violet Township in Fairfield County
- Coordinates: 39°53′23″N 82°45′15″W
- Country: United States
- State: Ohio
- County: Fairfield

Area
  - Total: 41.7 sq mi (108.0 km^{2})
  - Land: 41.6 sq mi (107.8 km^{2})
  - Water: 0.039 sq mi (0.1 km^{2})
- Elevation: 879 ft (268 m)

Population (2020)
  - Total: 45,785
  - Density: 7,297.0/sq mi (2,817.38/km^{2})
- Time zone: UTC-5 (Eastern (EST))
  - Summer (DST): UTC-4 (EDT)
- FIPS code: 39-80206
- GNIS feature ID: 1086084
- Website: www.violet.oh.us

Violet Township is one of the thirteen townships of Fairfield County, Ohio, United States. As of the 2020 census the population was 45,785, up from 38,572 people at the 2010 census. It is the only Township in Fairfield County that is classified as an urban township.

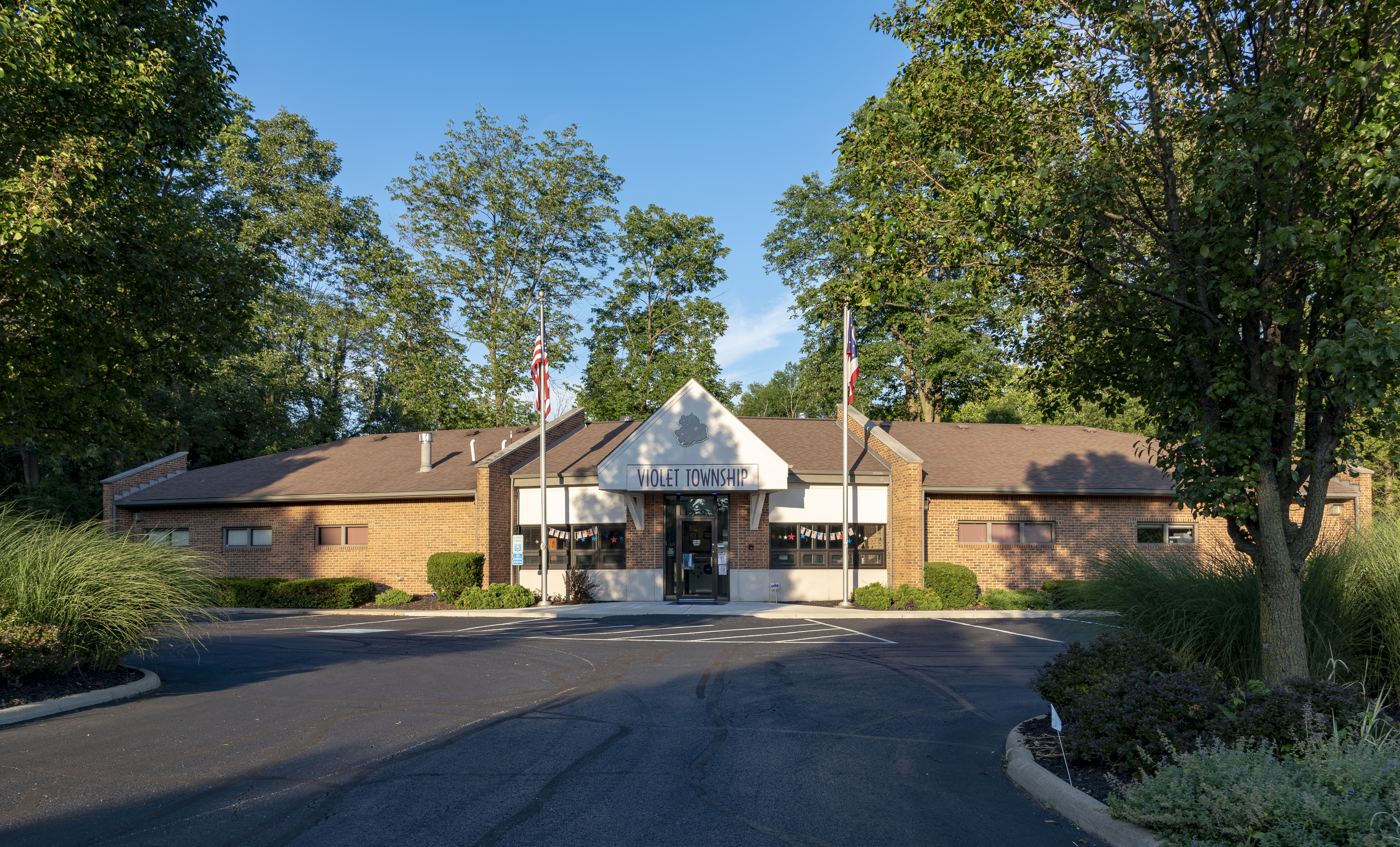
Violet Township Town Hall

== Geography ==
Located in the northwestern corner of the county, it borders the following townships:

- Etna Township, Licking County - north
- Liberty Township - east
- Greenfield Township - southeast corner
- Bloom Township - south
- Madison Township, Franklin County - southwest
- Truro Township, Franklin County - northwest

Several municipalities are partially located in Violet Township:

- The city of Canal Winchester, in the southwest
- The village of Lithopolis, in the southwest
- The city of Columbus, the capital of Ohio, in the northwest
- The city of Pickerington, in the center
- The city of Reynoldsburg, in the far northwest

== Name and history ==
=== Name ===
Violet Township, was organized in 1808, derives its name from the diverse array of wildflowers that once blanketed the area with a soft purple hue. It is the only Violet Township statewide.

=== Early history ===
The area's earliest recorded settler was George Kirke, a veteran of the Revolutionary War, who claimed 80 acres of land now occupied by the village of Pickerington. Kirke constructed a log hut on the site, which served as a temporary shelter for travelers and himself. In 1815, Abraham Pickering purchased the tenth section of land, including Kirke's claim, and laid out the first lots. Initially named Jacksonville, likely in honor of Andrew Jackson, the settlement was later renamed Pickerington.

The northern sections of Violet Township were part of the Refugee lands, known for their abundant wildlife, particularly wild turkeys and pigeons. These birds were a common food source for early settlers and were often sent to market during the fall and winter months. The large flocks of pigeons were also notable for causing damage to crops, with their weight sometimes breaking tree branches.

The township's early development was marked by the establishment of homesteads throughout the fertile farmland, often situated near natural springs and waterways. Settlers arrived in various ways, some preceding their families and others bringing their entire households to establish new lives in the forests. The community hub of Violet Township formed in what is now Olde Downtown Pickerington, originally known as Jacksonville.

== Government ==
The township is governed by a three-member board of trustees, who are elected in November of odd-numbered years to a four-year term beginning on the following January 1. Two are elected in the year after the presidential election and one is elected in the year before it. There is also an elected township fiscal officer, who serves a four-year term beginning on April 1 of the year after the election, which is held in November of the year before the presidential election. Vacancies in the fiscal officership or on the board of trustees are filled by the remaining trustees.

Violet Township currently does not have its own police agency and as such utilizes the Fairfield County Sheriffs Office, which provides two deputies at a time to service the area. Pickerington Police will also frequently assist deputies in policing the agency when call volume is high and resources are available.

The fire department services the unincorporated township, the City of Pickerington and parts of the City of Columbus and City of Reynoldsburg.
