= Richland Township, Fairfield County, Ohio =

Township in Ohio, US

- Township
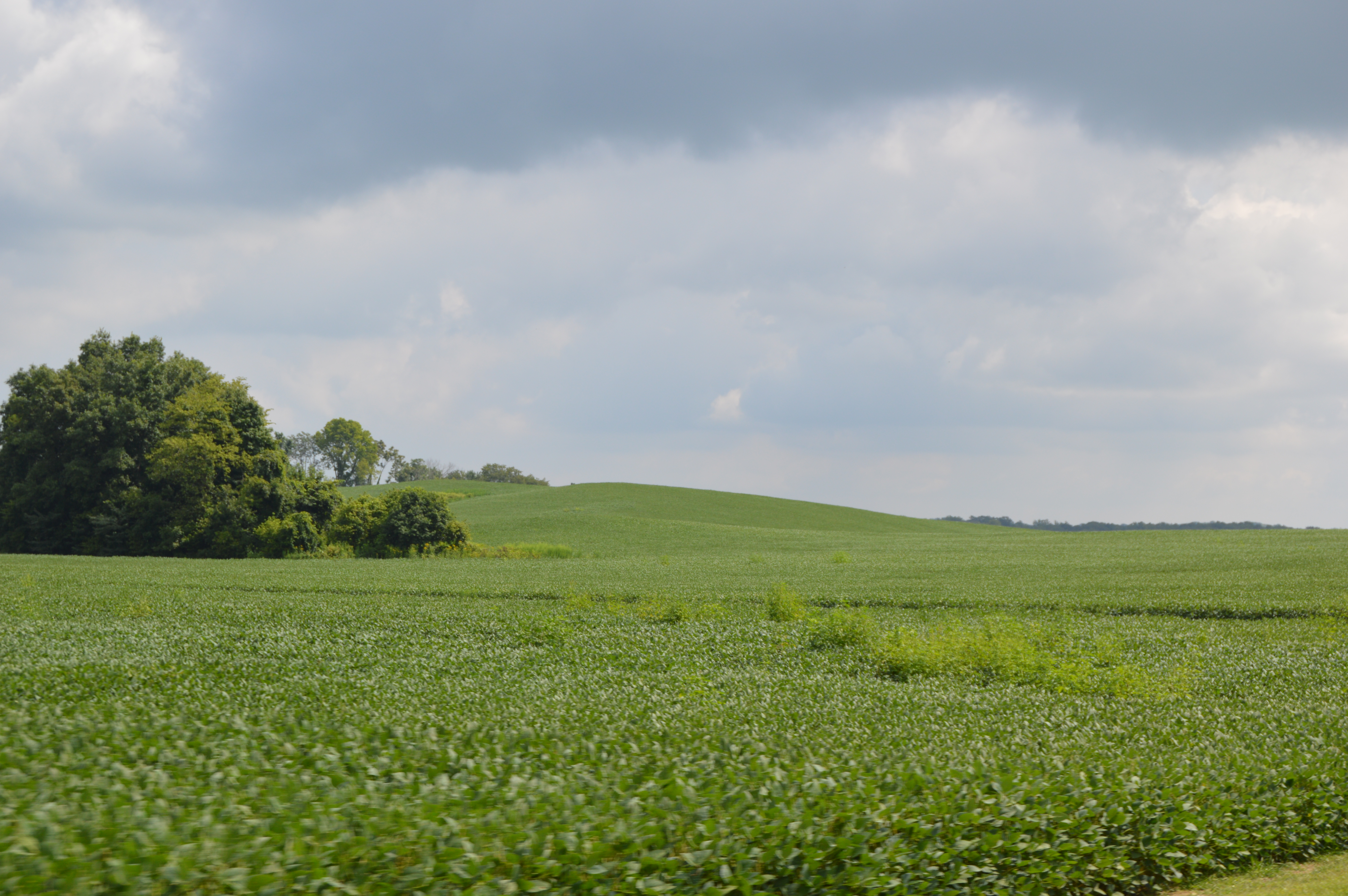
- Soybean fields north of Rushville

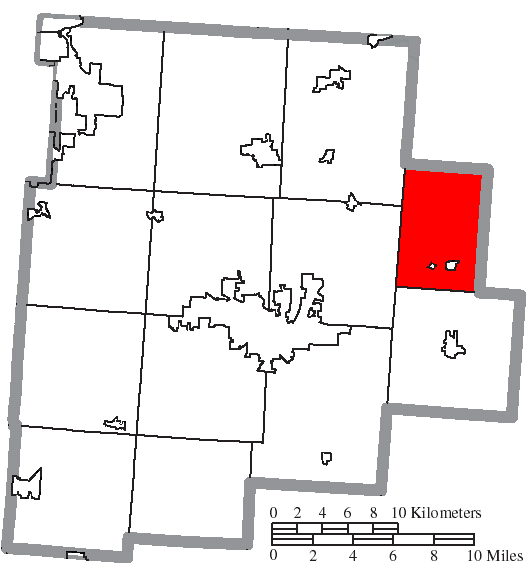
- Location of Richland Township in Fairfield County
- Coordinates: 39°47′22″N 82°26′9″W
- Country: United States
- State: Ohio
- County: Fairfield

Area
  - Total: 25.1 sq mi (65.1 km^{2})
  - Land: 24.7 sq mi (64.1 km^{2})
  - Water: 0.42 sq mi (1.1 km^{2})
- Elevation: 961 ft (293 m)

Population (2020)
  - Total: 2,307
  - Density: 93.2/sq mi (36.0/km^{2})
- Time zone: UTC-5 (Eastern (EST))
  - Summer (DST): UTC-4 (EDT)
- FIPS code: 39-66684
- GNIS feature ID: 1086082
- Website: www.richlandtownship.net

Richland Township is one of the thirteen townships of Fairfield County, Ohio, United States. As of the 2020 census the population was 2,307.

== Geography ==
Located in the eastern part of the county, it borders the following townships:

- Thorn Township, Perry County - north
- Reading Township, Perry County - east
- Rush Creek Township - south
- Pleasant Township - west
- Walnut Township - northwest

Two villages are located in Richland Township: Rushville in the southeast, and West Rushville in the southwest.

== Name and history ==
Richland Township was so named for the fertile soil within its borders. It is one of twelve Richland Townships statewide.

== Government ==
The township is governed by a three-member board of trustees, who are elected in November of odd-numbered years to a four-year term beginning on the following January 1. Two are elected in the year after the presidential election and one is elected in the year before it. There is also an elected township fiscal officer, who serves a four-year term beginning on April 1 of the year after the election, which is held in November of the year before the presidential election. Vacancies in the fiscal officership or on the board of trustees are filled by the remaining trustees.
