= Bremen, Ohio =

- Village
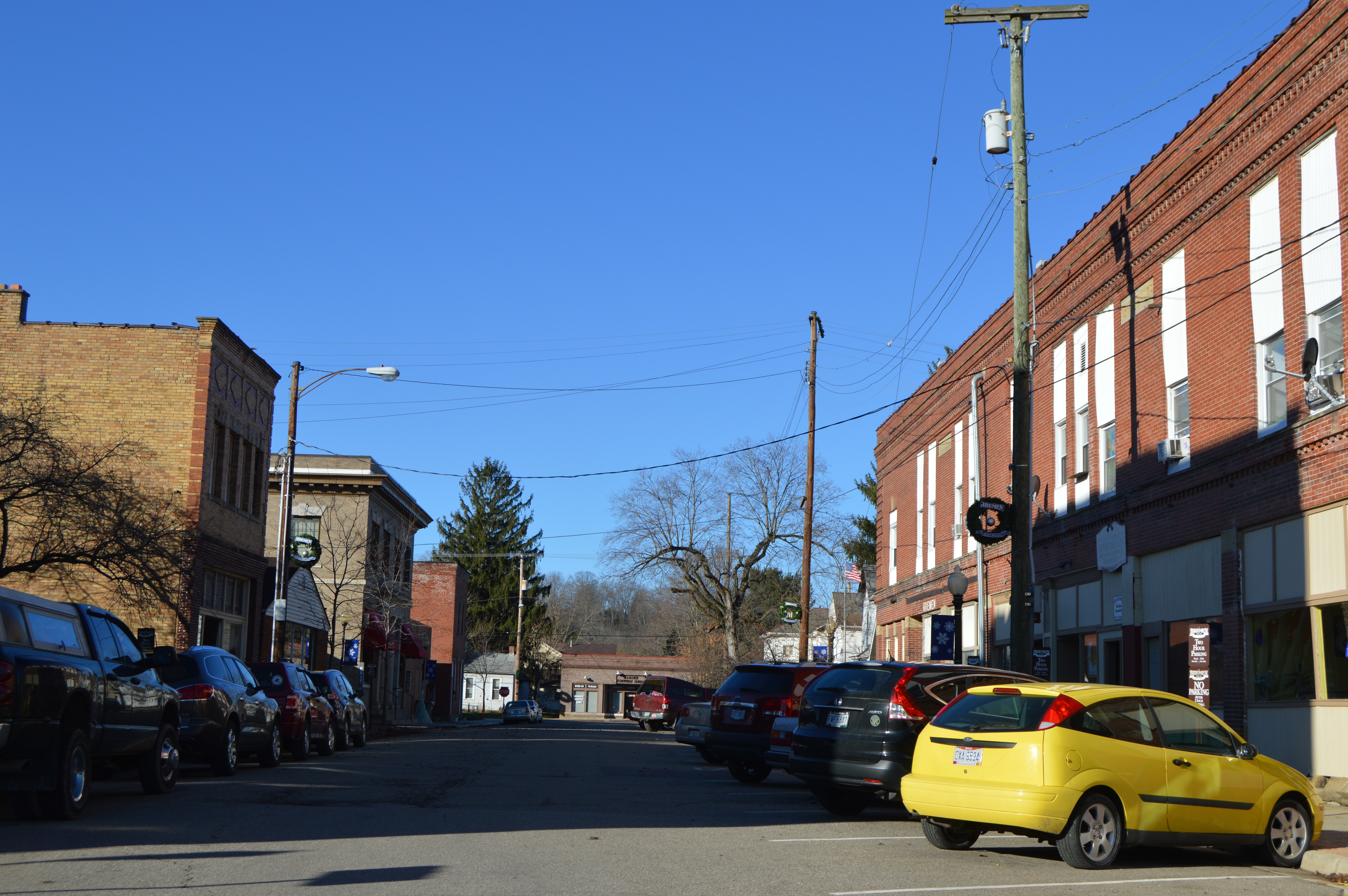
- Main Street downtown

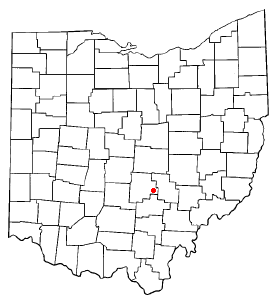
- Location of Bremen, Ohio

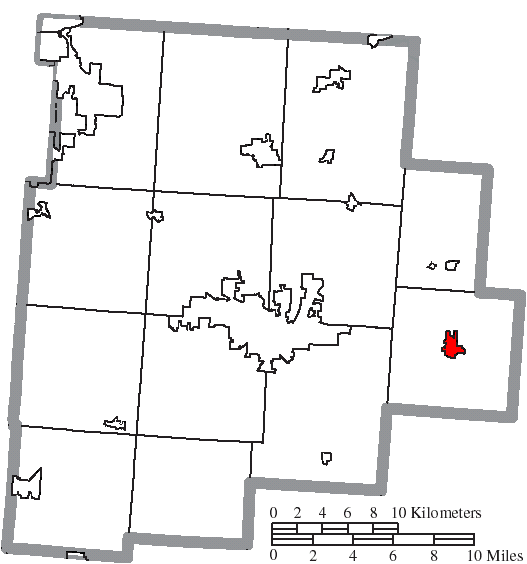
- Location of Bremen in Fairfield County
- Coordinates: 39°42′22″N 82°25′46″W
- Country: United States
- State: Ohio
- County: Fairfield

Area
  - Total: 0.86 sq mi (2.24 km^{2})
  - Land: 0.86 sq mi (2.23 km^{2})
  - Water: 0.0039 sq mi (0.01 km^{2})
- Elevation: 797 ft (243 m)

Population (2020)
  - Total: 1,479
  - Estimate (2023): 1,502
  - Density: 1,716.8/sq mi (662.86/km^{2})
- Time zone: UTC-5 (Eastern (EST))
  - Summer (DST): UTC-4 (EDT)
- ZIP code: 43107
- Area code: 740
- FIPS code: 39-08392
- GNIS feature ID: 2397448
- Website: bremenvillage.com

Bremen (/ˈbrɛmən/ BREM-ən) is a village in Fairfield County, Ohio, United States. The population was 1,479 at the 2020 census.

== History ==
Bremen was platted in 1834. The village was named after Bremen, in Germany.

The Bremen Oil Field was discovered in 1907, setting off an oil boom, which lasted until the early 1920s. Oil Derrick Days are celebrated every September, as a way for the town to remember its oil industry heritage.

== Geography ==
According to the United States Census Bureau, the village has a total area of 0.86 square miles (2.23 km^{2}), all land.

== Demographics ==
Historical population
| Census | Pop. | Note | %± |
|---|---|---|---|
| 1880 | 248 | | — |
| 1890 | 244 | | −1.6% |
| 1900 | 466 | | 91.0% |
| 1910 | 925 | | 98.5% |
| 1920 | 1,134 | | 22.6% |
| 1930 | 1,232 | | 8.6% |
| 1940 | 1,176 | | −4.5% |
| 1950 | 1,187 | | 0.9% |
| 1960 | 1,417 | | 19.4% |
| 1970 | 1,413 | | −0.3% |
| 1980 | 1,432 | | 1.3% |
| 1990 | 1,386 | | −3.2% |
| 2000 | 1,265 | | −8.7% |
| 2010 | 1,425 | | 12.6% |
| 2020 | 1,479 | | 3.8% |
| 2023 (est.) | 1,502 | ▲ | 1.6% |
U.S. Decennial Census

=== 2010 census ===
As of the census of 2010, there were 1,425 people, 506 households, and 394 families living in the village. The population density was 1,657.0 inhabitants per square mile (639.8/km^{2}). There were 546 housing units at an average density of 634.9 per square mile (245.1/km^{2}). The racial makeup of the village was 98.2% White, 0.3% African American, 0.3% Native American, 0.1% Pacific Islander, and 1.2% from two or more races. Hispanic or Latino of any race were 0.4% of the population.

There were 506 households, of which 42.7% had children under the age of 18 living with them, 58.5% were married couples living together, 14.6% had a female householder with no husband present, 4.7% had a male householder with no wife present, and 22.1% were non-families. 18.4% of all households were made up of individuals, and 7.3% had someone living alone who was 65 years of age or older. The average household size was 2.79 and the average family size was 3.15.

The median age in the village was 34.5 years. 31.1% of residents were under the age of 18; 6.1% were between the ages of 18 and 24; 27.2% were from 25 to 44; 22.6% were from 45 to 64; and 13.2% were 65 years of age or older. The gender makeup of the village was 49.8% male and 50.2% female.

=== 2000 census ===
As of the census of 2000, there were 1,265 people, 483 households, and 360 families living in the village. The population density was 1,515.3 inhabitants per square mile (585.1/km^{2}). There were 506 housing units at an average density of 606.1 per square mile (234.0/km^{2}). The racial makeup of the village was 99.45% White, and 0.55% from two or more races. Hispanic or Latino of any race were 0.32% of the population.

There were 483 households, out of which 39.8% had children under the age of 18 living with them, 58.0% were married couples living together, 10.8% had a female householder with no husband present, and 25.3% were non-families. 23.2% of all households were made up of individuals, and 13.5% had someone living alone who was 65 years of age or older. The average household size was 2.62 and the average family size was 3.06.

In the village, the population was spread out, with 29.6% under the age of 18, 7.8% from 18 to 24, 29.3% from 25 to 44, 20.1% from 45 to 64, and 13.1% who were 65 years of age or older. The median age was 35 years. For every 100 females there were 88.8 males. For every 100 females age 18 and over, there were 89.8 males.

The median income for a household in the village was $38,036, and the median income for a family was $44,844. Males had a median income of $33,472 versus $22,202 for females. The per capita income for the village was $16,408. About 6.9% of families and 6.7% of the population were below the poverty line, including 10.7% of those under age 18 and 4.6% of those age 65 or over.

== Education ==
The village contains one public school, Bremen Elementary, operated by Fairfield Union Local Schools. Bremen has a public library, a branch of the Fairfield County District Library.

== See also ==
- Petroleum industry in Ohio
