= Fairfield County, Ohio =

County in Ohio, US

- County
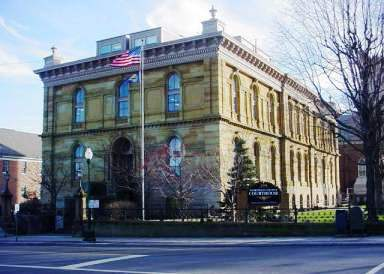
- Fairfield County Courthouse

- Seal

- Location within the U.S. state of Ohio
- Coordinates: 39°45′N 82°38′W
- Country: United States
- State: Ohio
- Founded: December 9, 1800
- Named for: the Fairfield area of Lancaster, Lancashire, UK
- Seat: Lancaster
- Largest city: Lancaster

Area
  - Total: 509 sq mi (1,320 km^{2})
  - Land: 504 sq mi (1,310 km^{2})
  - Water: 4.2 sq mi (11 km^{2}) 0.8%

Population (2020)
  - Total: 158,921
  - Estimate (2025): 169,752 ▲
  - Density: 310/sq mi (120/km^{2})
- Time zone: UTC−5 (Eastern)
  - Summer (DST): UTC−4 (EDT)
- Congressional district: 12th
- Website: www.co.fairfield.oh.us

Fairfield County is located in the U.S. state of Ohio. As of the 2020 census, the population was 158,921. Its county seat and largest city is Lancaster. Its name is a reference to the Fairfield area of the original Lancaster. Fairfield County is part of the Columbus, OH Metropolitan Statistical Area.

== History ==
Fairfield County originally encompassed all or parts of present day Knox, Hocking, Licking, Perry, and Pickaway Counties. Fairfield is a descriptive name referring to the beauty of their fields.

== Geography ==
According to the U.S. Census Bureau, the county has a total area of 509 square miles (1,320 km^{2}), of which 504 square miles (1,310 km^{2}) is land and 4.2 square miles (11 km^{2}) (0.8%) is water.

Fairfield County sits just on the edge of Ohio's Appalachian region. While the once-glaciated northern portion of the county is fairly flat, as one travels south along U.S. 33 one can easily recognize the foothills of a mountainous region beginning around the village of Carroll. Although not officially part of the state or federal definition of Appalachia, certain areas of Fairfield County—particularly those south of U.S. 22—bear a distinctly Appalachian feel in both physical geography and demographics.

The scenic Hocking Hills region lies immediately to the south, mostly in neighboring Hocking County. A large portion of Buckeye Lake is located in northeastern Fairfield County.

Mudhouse Mansion, an allegedly haunted house, was located in the county.

=== Adjacent counties ===
- Licking County (north)
- Perry County (east)
- Hocking County (south)
- Pickaway County (southwest)
- Franklin County (northwest)

== Demographics ==
Historical population
Census	Pop.	Note	%±
1810	11,361		—
1820	16,633		46.4%
1830	24,786		49.0%
1840	31,924		28.8%
1850	30,264		−5.2%
1860	30,538		0.9%
1870	31,138		2.0%
1880	34,284		10.1%
1890	33,939		−1.0%
1900	34,259		0.9%
1910	39,201		14.4%
1920	40,484		3.3%
1930	44,010		8.7%
1940	48,490		10.2%
1950	52,130		7.5%
1960	63,912		22.6%
1970	73,301		14.7%
1980	93,678		27.8%
1990	103,461		10.4%
2000	122,759		18.7%
2010	146,156		19.1%
2020	158,921		8.7%
2025 (est.)	169,752	▲	6.8%
U.S. Decennial Census; 1790-1960 1900-1990; 1990-2000 2020

=== 2020 census ===
Fairfield County, Ohio – Racial and ethnic composition Note: the US Census treats Hispanic/Latino as an ethnic category. This table excludes Latinos from the racial categories and assigns them to a separate category. Hispanics/Latinos may be of any race.
Race / Ethnicity (NH = Non-Hispanic)	Pop 1980	Pop 1990	Pop 2000	Pop 2010	Pop 2020	% 1980	% 1990	% 2000	% 2010	% 2020
White alone (NH)	92,598	101,269	116,201	130,377	130,664	98.85%	97.88%	94.66%	89.20%	82.22%
Black or African American alone (NH)	318	1,125	3,245	8,609	13,302	0.34%	1.09%	2.64%	5.89%	8.37%
Native American or Alaska Native alone (NH)	81	182	219	278	287	0.09%	0.18%	0.18%	0.19%	0.18%
Asian alone (NH)	217	374	878	1,626	3,063	0.23%	0.36%	0.72%	1.11%	1.93%
Native Hawaiian or Pacific Islander alone (NH)	x	x	26	39	31	x	x	0.02%	0.03%	0.02%
Other race alone (NH)	65	22	73	190	515	0.07%	0.02%	0.06%	0.13%	0.32%
Mixed race or Multiracial (NH)	x	x	1,124	2,527	7,038	x	x	0.92%	1.73%	4.43%
Hispanic or Latino (any race)	399	489	993	2,510	4,021	0.43%	0.47%	0.81%	1.72%	2.53%
Total	93,678	103,461	122,759	146,156	158,921	100.00%	100.00%	100.00%	100.00%	100.00%

As of the 2020 census, the county had a population of 158,921. The median age was 39.7 years. 24.3% of residents were under the age of 18 and 16.8% of residents were 65 years of age or older. For every 100 females there were 98.2 males, and for every 100 females age 18 and over there were 96.2 males age 18 and over.

The racial makeup of the county was 82.9% White, 8.5% Black or African American, 0.2% American Indian and Alaska Native, 1.9% Asian, <0.1% Native Hawaiian and Pacific Islander, 1.0% from some other race, and 5.4% from two or more races. Hispanic or Latino residents of any race comprised 2.5% of the population.

64.4% of residents lived in urban areas, while 35.6% lived in rural areas.

There were 58,691 households in the county, of which 34.1% had children under the age of 18 living in them. Of all households, 55.1% were married-couple households, 14.9% were households with a male householder and no spouse or partner present, and 22.8% were households with a female householder and no spouse or partner present. About 22.7% of all households were made up of individuals and 10.3% had someone living alone who was 65 years of age or older.

There were 62,466 housing units, of which 6.0% were vacant. Among occupied housing units, 73.7% were owner-occupied and 26.3% were renter-occupied. The homeowner vacancy rate was 1.0% and the rental vacancy rate was 7.5%.

=== 2010 census ===
As of the 2010 United States census, there were 146,156 people, 54,310 households, and 39,846 families living in the county. The population density was 289.8 inhabitants per square mile (111.9/km^{2}). There were 58,687 housing units at an average density of 116.3 units per square mile (44.9 units/km^{2}). The racial makeup of the county was 90.2% white, 6.0% black or African American, 1.1% Asian, 0.2% American Indian, 0.6% from other races, and 1.9% from two or more races. Those of Hispanic or Latino origin made up 1.7% of the population. In terms of ancestry, 31.2% were German, 16.2% were Irish, 11.7% were English, 8.6% were American, and 5.2% were Italian.

Of the 54,310 households, 37.3% had children under the age of 18 living with them, 57.3% were married couples living together, 11.2% had a female householder with no husband present, 26.6% were non-families, and 21.9% of all households were made up of individuals. The average household size was 2.64 and the average family size was 3.07. The median age was 38.2 years.

The median income for a household in the county was $56,796 and the median income for a family was $65,835. Males had a median income of $49,314 versus $37,209 for females. The per capita income for the county was $26,130. About 7.5% of families and 10.4% of the population were below the poverty line, including 14.7% of those under age 18 and 6.7% of those age 65 or over.

=== 2000 census ===
As of the census of 2010, there were 146,156 people, 54,310 households, and 39,846 families living in the county. The population density was 289 inhabitants per square mile (112/km^{2}). There were 58,678 housing units at an average density of 116 units per square mile (45/km^{2}). The racial makeup of the county was 90.02% White, 6.00% Black or African American, 0.20% Native American, 1.10% Asian, 0.00% Pacific Islander, 0.23% from other races, and 1.90% from two or more races. 1.70% of the population were Hispanic or Latino of any race.

There were 54,310 households, out of which 34.10% had children under the age of 18 living with them, 57.30% were married couples living together, 11.20% had a female householder with no husband present, and 26.60% were non-families. 21.90% of all households were made up of individuals, and 8.40% had someone living alone who was 65 years of age or older. The average household size was 2.64 and the average family size was 3.07.

In the county, the population was spread out, with 26.30% under the age of 18, 8.00% from 18 to 24, 30.20% from 25 to 44, 23.90% from 45 to 64, and 12.40% who were 65 years of age or older. The median age was 38.2 years. For every 100 females, there were 99.20 males. For every 100 females age 18 and over, there were 96.30 males.

The median income for a household in the county was $47,962, and the median income for a family was $55,539. Males had a median income of $39,566 versus $27,353 for females. The per capita income for the county was $21,671. About 4.50% of families and 5.90% of the population were below the poverty line, including 7.40% of those under age 18 and 6.20% of those age 65 or over.

== Politics ==
Prior to 1944, Fairfield County was Democratic in presidential elections, only voting for Republicans twice from 1856 to 1940. Starting with the 1944 election, the county has become a Republican stronghold in presidential elections, with Lyndon B. Johnson being the only Democrat to win since then, but Harry S. Truman came within 96 votes of winning it in 1948.

United States presidential election results for Fairfield County, Ohio
Year	Republican		Democratic		Third party(ies)	
Year	No.	%	No.	%	No.	%
1856	1,700	30.12%	3,233	57.28%	711	12.60%
1860	2,178	37.66%	3,249	56.18%	356	6.16%
1864	2,427	40.87%	3,512	59.13%	0	0.00%
1868	2,439	37.44%	4,076	62.56%	0	0.00%
1872	2,540	39.40%	3,888	60.31%	19	0.29%
1876	2,770	37.57%	4,597	62.36%	5	0.07%
1880	3,103	38.91%	4,842	60.72%	29	0.36%
1884	3,210	38.94%	4,922	59.70%	112	1.36%
1888	3,058	37.64%	4,846	59.65%	220	2.71%
1892	3,004	37.83%	4,650	58.56%	287	3.61%
1896	3,432	39.20%	5,250	59.96%	74	0.85%
1900	3,738	40.14%	5,431	58.32%	144	1.55%
1904	4,084	45.26%	4,632	51.33%	308	3.41%
1908	4,023	40.24%	5,821	58.22%	154	1.54%
1912	1,672	18.83%	5,101	57.45%	2,106	23.72%
1916	3,380	34.69%	6,172	63.34%	192	1.97%
1920	7,572	46.46%	8,610	52.83%	116	0.71%
1924	8,281	53.80%	5,890	38.26%	1,222	7.94%
1928	12,072	67.87%	5,619	31.59%	97	0.55%
1932	8,050	43.04%	10,410	55.66%	244	1.30%
1936	8,062	38.70%	12,322	59.16%	446	2.14%
1940	10,813	48.90%	11,298	51.10%	0	0.00%
1944	11,135	56.89%	8,439	43.11%	0	0.00%
1948	9,471	50.09%	9,375	49.58%	61	0.32%
1952	15,027	62.18%	9,140	37.82%	0	0.00%
1956	15,647	65.24%	8,337	34.76%	0	0.00%
1960	17,743	66.03%	9,128	33.97%	0	0.00%
1964	11,480	42.38%	15,611	57.62%	0	0.00%
1968	14,810	52.03%	9,533	33.49%	4,124	14.49%
1972	21,909	71.67%	7,746	25.34%	913	2.99%
1976	19,098	57.73%	13,361	40.39%	620	1.87%
1980	24,096	60.98%	13,144	33.26%	2,275	5.76%
1984	30,843	75.17%	9,817	23.92%	373	0.91%
1988	29,208	69.46%	12,504	29.74%	339	0.81%
1992	24,125	47.50%	14,249	28.06%	12,415	24.44%
1996	26,850	52.98%	18,821	37.13%	5,013	9.89%
2000	33,523	61.97%	19,065	35.24%	1,506	2.78%
2004	42,715	62.93%	24,783	36.51%	384	0.57%
2008	41,580	57.63%	29,250	40.54%	1,317	1.83%
2012	41,034	56.82%	29,890	41.39%	1,296	1.79%
2016	44,314	60.25%	24,881	33.83%	4,359	5.93%
2020	50,797	60.97%	31,224	37.48%	1,290	1.55%
2024	51,999	61.57%	31,695	37.53%	763	0.90%

United States Senate election results for Fairfield County, Ohio1
Year	Republican		Democratic		Third party(ies)	
Year	No.	%	No.	%	No.	%
2024	47,342	56.45%	33,697	40.18%	2,819	3.36%

== Government ==
Seal of the Fairfield County Auditor

Office	Officeholder	Party
Fairfield County Commissioner	David L. Levacy	Republican
Fairfield County Commissioner	Steve Davis	Republican
Fairfield County Commissioner	Jeffrey Fix	Republican
Auditor	Carri Brown, PhD	Republican
Clerk of Courts	Branden Meyer	Republican
Coroner	Dr. L. Brian Varney, M.D.	Republican
Engineer	Jeremiah Upp	Republican
Prosecutor	Kyle Witt	Republican
Recorder	Lisa R. McKenzie	Republican
Sheriff	Alex Lape	Republican
Treasurer	James Bahnsen	Republican

=== Ohio House of Representatives ===
District	Representative	Party
69	Kevin Miller	Republican
73	Jeff LaRe	Republican

=== Ohio State Senate ===
District	Senator	Party
20	Tim Schaffer	Republican

=== United States House of Representatives ===
District	Representative	Party
12	Troy Balderson	Republican
15	Mike Carey	Republican

=== United States Senate ===
Senator	Party
Bernie Moreno	Republican
Jon Husted	Republican

== Education ==
=== School districts and state schools ===
School districts include:

- Amanda-Clearcreek Local School District
- Berne Union Local School District
- Bloom-Carroll Local School District
- Canal Winchester Local School District (Franklin & Fairfield)
- Fairfield Union Local School District
- Lancaster City School District
- Liberty Union-Thurston Local School District
- Northern Local School District
- Pickerington Local School District
- Reynoldsburg City Schools
- Southwest Licking Local School District
- Teays Valley Local School District (Almost entirely Pickaway)
- Walnut Township Local School District

=== Elementary schools ===
- St. Mary's School
- St. Bernadette School
- Mount Pleasant Elementary
- Medill Elementary (housed at former East Elementary location during reconstruction)
- Sanderson Elementary (to be closed upon completion of Medill Elementary reconstruction)
- Tallmadge Elementary (housed at former West Elementary location during reconstruction)
- Tarhe Trails Elementary
- Gorsuch West Elementary
- Pleasantville Elementary
- Bremen Elementary

=== High schools ===
- Amanda-Clearcreek Digital Academy
- Amanda-Clearcreek High School
- Liberty Union High School
- Bloom-Carroll High School
- Fairfield Career Center
- Fairfield Christian Academy
- Fairfield Union High School
- Lancaster Fairfield Alternative School
- Lancaster High School
- Millersport Jr/Sr High School
- Walnut Township Academy
- Pickerington Alternative School
- Pickerington High School Central
- Pickerington High School North
- Berne Union High School
- William V. Fisher Catholic High School

== Transportation ==
=== Airports ===
The Fairfield County Airport is located three nautical miles (3.5 mi; 5.6 km) northwest of Lancaster's central business district.

=== Major highways ===
- I-70
- US 22
- US 33

== Communities ==
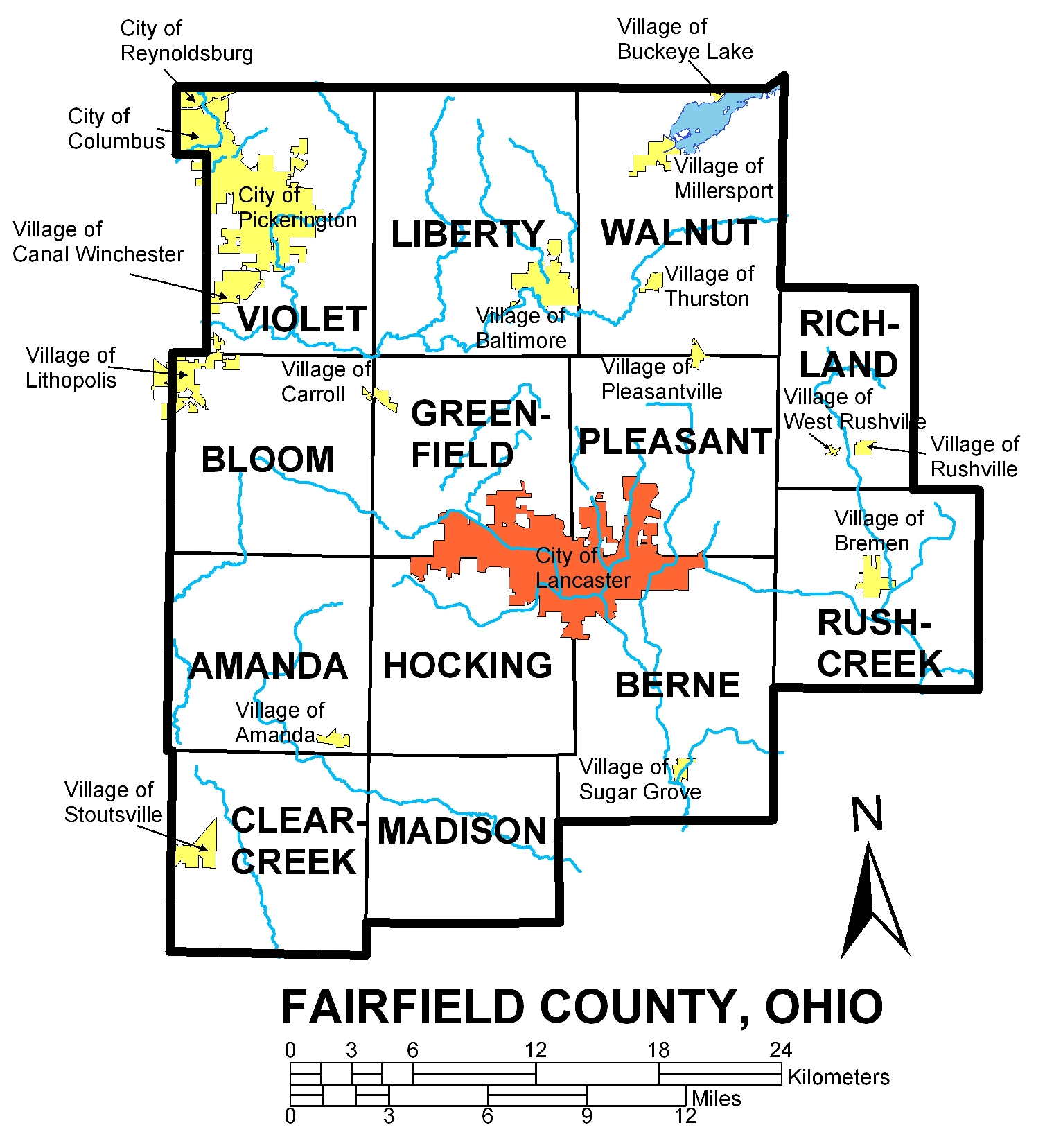
Map of Fairfield County, Ohio with Municipal and Township Labels

=== Cities ===
- Canal Winchester
- Columbus (mostly in Franklin County and partly in Delaware County)
- Lancaster (county seat)
- Pickerington
- Reynoldsburg

=== Villages ===
- Amanda
- Baltimore
- Bremen
- Buckeye Lake
- Carroll
- Lithopolis
- Millersport
- Pleasantville
- Rushville
- Stoutsville
- Sugar Grove
- Tarlton
- Thurston
- West Rushville

=== Townships ===
- Amanda
- Berne
- Bloom
- Clearcreek
- Greenfield
- Hocking
- Liberty
- Madison
- Pleasant
- Richland
- Rush Creek
- Violet
- Walnut

=== Census-designated places ===
- Fairfield Beach
- Hamburg
- Hide-A-Way Hills

=== Unincorporated communities ===
- Cedar Hill
- Clearport
- Colfax
- Delmont
- Drinkle
- Dumontsville
- Geneva
- Greencastle
- Havensport
- Hooker
- Horns Mill
- Jefferson
- Lockville
- Marcy
- New Salem
- North Berne
- Oakland
- Oakthorpe
- Revenge
- Royalton
- Waterloo

== See also ==
- National Register of Historic Places listings in Fairfield County, Ohio
