= Sugar Grove, Ohio =

- Village
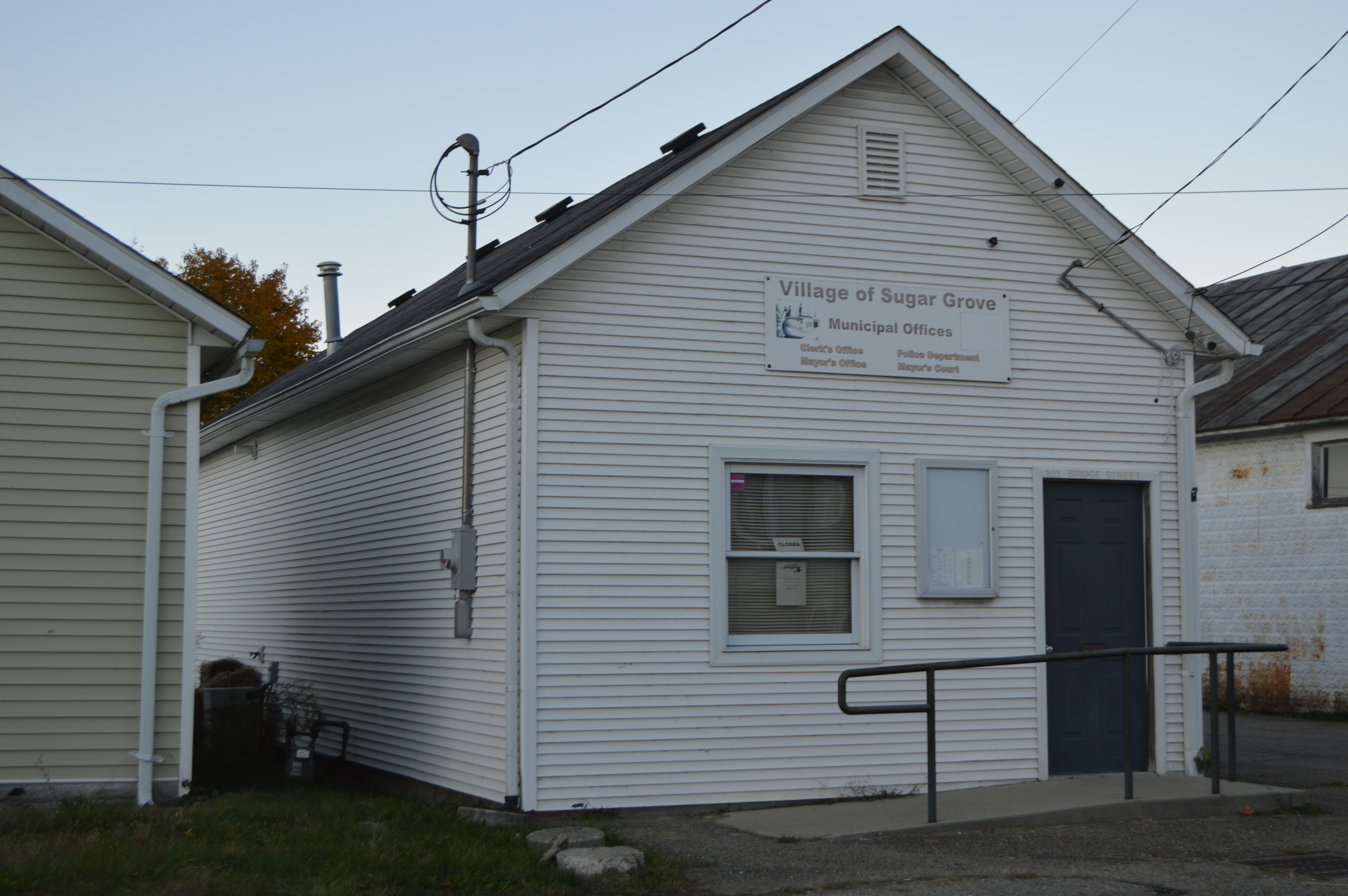
- Village Hall
- Nicknames: Gateway to the Hocking Hills, The Grove, SG
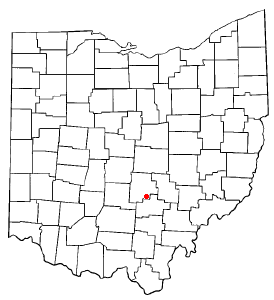
- Location of Sugar Grove, Ohio

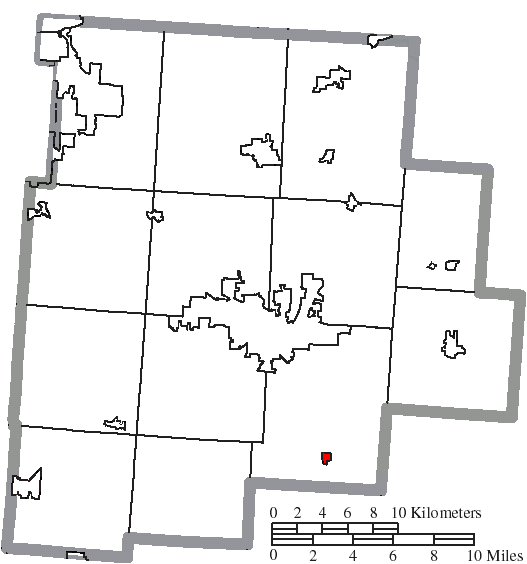
- Location of Sugar Grove in Fairfield County
- Coordinates: 39°37′36″N 82°32′46″W
- Country: United States
- State: Ohio
- County: Fairfield

Government
  - Type: Mayor-council

Area
  - Total: 0.32 sq mi (0.83 km^{2})
  - Land: 0.31 sq mi (0.80 km^{2})
  - Water: 0.012 sq mi (0.03 km^{2})
- Elevation: 781 ft (238 m)

Population (2020)
  - Total: 429
  - Density: 1,397.2/sq mi (539.47/km^{2})
- Time zone: UTC-5 (Eastern (EST))
  - Summer (DST): UTC-4 (EDT)
- ZIP code: 43155
- Area code: 740
- FIPS code: 39-75252
- GNIS feature ID: 1060971
- Website: www.sugar-grove.com

Sugar Grove is a village in Fairfield County, Ohio, United States. The population was 372 at the 2020 census.

Located at the confluence of Rush Creek and the Hocking River, Sugar Grove has been called the "gateway to the Hocking Hills", due to its location along U.S. Route 33 between Lancaster and the Hocking Hills region. The village was incorporated in 1851 and historically served as a stop along the canal and early transport routes.

== History ==
Sugar Grove was officially platted in 1830 and incorporated in 1851. It is named for a sugar orchard near the original town site. Early settlement began in 1834 with pioneers such as Asa McDole and the Isbell brothers, who are credited with building the first cabin in what would become the village.

The village grew at the confluence of Rush Creek and the Hocking River and served as a waypoint along early transport routes, including the Hocking Canal Through the 19th and early 20th centuries, Sugar Grove supported a mix of agriculture, small industries, and locally owned commerce. Several early structures remain, including canal-era buildings and 19th-century storefronts.

Its location along modern U.S. Route 33 continues to support village life and tourism. Sugar Grove has been called the "Gateway to the Hocking Hills" due to its proximity to the regional park system and scenic byways.

== Geography ==
According to the United States Census Bureau, the village has a total area of 0.30 square miles (0.78 km^{2}), of which 0.29 square miles (0.75 km^{2}) is land and 0.01 square miles (0.03 km^{2}) is water.

== Demographics ==
Historical population
Census	Pop.	Note	%±
1870	254		—
1880	262		3.1%
1890	275		5.0%
1900	350		27.3%
1910	368		5.1%
1920	420		14.1%
1930	388		−7.6%
1940	429		10.6%
1950	434		1.2%
1960	479		10.4%
1970	469		−2.1%
1980	407		−13.2%
1990	465		14.3%
2000	448		−3.7%
2010	426		−4.9%
2020	429		0.7%
U.S. Decennial Census

=== 2010 census ===
As of the census of 2010, there were 426 people, 155 households, and 123 families living in the village. The population density was 1,469.0 inhabitants per square mile (567.2/km^{2}). There were 175 housing units at an average density of 603.4 per square mile (233.0/km^{2}). The racial makeup of the village was 98.1% White, 1.4% Native American, and 0.5% from two or more races. Hispanic or Latino of any race were 0.5% of the population.

There were 155 households, of which 50.3% had children under the age of 18 living with them, 47.7% were married couples living together, 25.2% had a female householder with no husband present, 6.5% had a male householder with no wife present, and 20.6% were non-families. 18.1% of all households were made up of individuals, and 4.5% had someone living alone who was 65 years of age or older. The average household size was 2.75 and the average family size was 3.00.

The median age in the village was 34.8 years. 30.8% of residents were under the age of 18; 9.3% were between the ages of 18 and 24; 27.2% were from 25 to 44; 26% were from 45 to 64; and 6.6% were 65 years of age or older. The gender makeup of the village was 50.2% male and 49.8% female.

=== 2000 census ===
As of the census of 2000, there were 448 people, 162 households, and 121 families living in the village. The population density was 2,182.1 inhabitants per square mile (842.5/km^{2}). There were 171 housing units at an average density of 832.9 per square mile (321.6/km^{2}). The racial makeup of the village was 99.55% White, and 0.45% from two or more races. Hispanic or Latino of any race were 0.67% of the population.

There were 162 households, out of which 41.4% had children under the age of 18 living with them, 55.6% were married couples living together, 15.4% had a female householder with no husband present, and 24.7% were non-families. 22.8% of all households were made up of individuals, and 9.9% had someone living alone who was 65 years of age or older. The average household size was 2.77 and the average family size was 3.17.

In the village, the population was spread out, with 32.8% under the age of 18, 8.9% from 18 to 24, 28.3% from 25 to 44, 18.5% from 45 to 64, and 11.4% who were 65 years of age or older. The median age was 32 years. For every 100 females there were 92.3 males. For every 100 females age 18 and over, there were 88.1 males.

The median income for a household in the village was $39,107, and the median income for a family was $42,500. Males had a median income of $32,813 versus $22,083 for females. The per capita income for the village was $14,547. About 6.1% of families and 6.0% of the population were below the poverty line, including 8.4% of those under age 18 and 4.2% of those age 65 or over.
