= Millersport, Ohio =

- Village
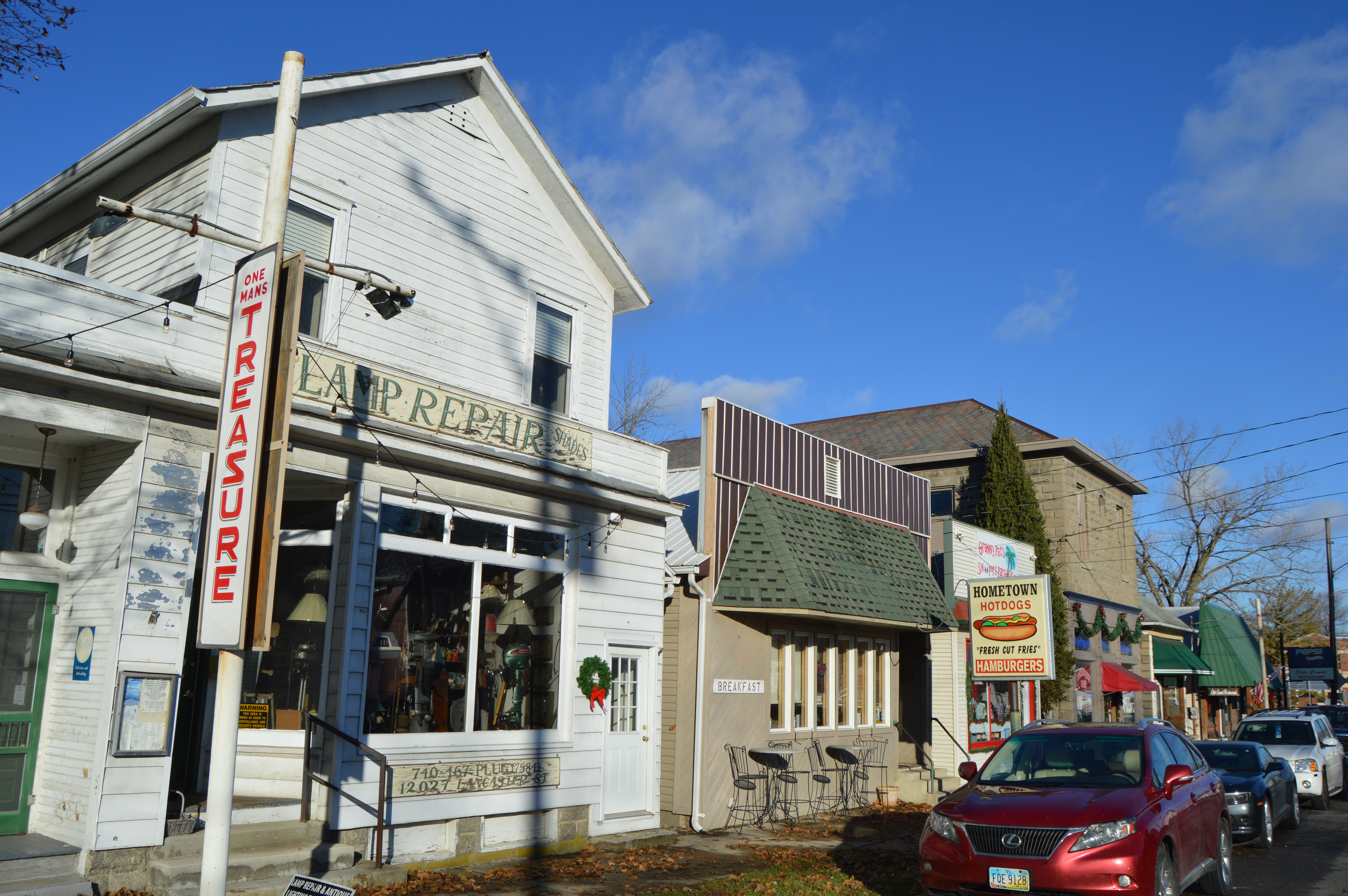
- Lancaster Street downtown

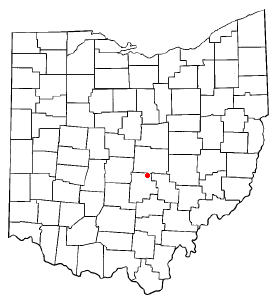
- Location of Millersport, Ohio

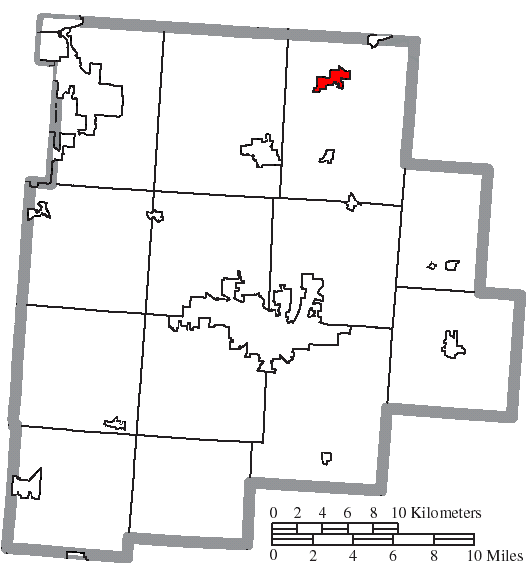
- Location of Millersport in Fairfield County
- Coordinates: 39°53′53″N 82°32′19″W
- Country: United States
- State: Ohio
- County: Fairfield

Government
  - Type: Mayor–council government

Area
  - Total: 0.96 sq mi (2.49 km^{2})
  - Land: 0.93 sq mi (2.41 km^{2})
  - Water: 0.031 sq mi (0.08 km^{2})
- Elevation: 922 ft (281 m)

Population (2020)
  - Total: 978
  - Density: 1,051.5/sq mi (405.99/km^{2})
- Time zone: UTC-5 (Eastern (EST))
  - Summer (DST): UTC-4 (EDT)
- ZIP code: 43046
- Area code: 740
- FIPS code: 39-50400
- GNIS feature ID: 2399359
- Website: www.millersportohio.com

Millersport is a village in Fairfield County, Ohio, United States. The population was 978 at the 2020 census. Millersport is the home of the Sweet Corn Festival, which is held in Millersport annually during the first week of September.

== History ==
Millersport was laid out in 1825 by Mathias Miller, and named for him. A post office called Millersport has been in operation since 1839.

== Geography ==
According to the United States Census Bureau, the village has a total area of 0.90 square miles (2.33 km^{2}), of which 0.87 square miles (2.25 km^{2}) is land and 0.03 square miles (0.08 km^{2}) is water.

== Demographics ==
Historical population
Census	Pop.	Note	%±
1850	149		—
1870	149		—
1920	370		—
1930	393		6.2%
1940	460		17.0%
1950	605		31.5%
1960	752		24.3%
1970	777		3.3%
1980	844		8.6%
1990	1,010		19.7%
2000	963		−4.7%
2010	1,044		8.4%
2020	978		−6.3%
U.S. Decennial Census

=== 2010 census ===
As of the census of 2010, there were 1,044 people, 440 households, and 295 families living in the village. The population density was 1,200.0 inhabitants per square mile (463.3/km^{2}). There were 497 housing units at an average density of 571.3 per square mile (220.6/km^{2}). The racial makeup of the village was 98.1% White, 0.4% African American, 0.4% Native American, 0.1% Pacific Islander, 0.1% from other races, and 1.0% from two or more races. Hispanic or Latino of any race were 1.1% of the population.

There were 440 households, of which 33.0% had children under the age of 18 living with them, 44.3% were married couples living together, 17.7% had a female householder with no husband present, 5.0% had a male householder with no wife present, and 33.0% were non-families. 28.4% of all households were made up of individuals, and 10.9% had someone living alone who was 65 years of age or older. The average household size was 2.37 and the average family size was 2.87.

The median age in the village was 39.1 years. 23.5% of residents were under the age of 18; 10.9% were between the ages of 18 and 24; 23.3% were from 25 to 44; 28.3% were from 45 to 64; and 14.1% were 65 years of age or older. The gender makeup of the village was 47.2% male and 52.8% female.

=== 2000 census ===
As of the census of 2000, there were 963 people, 403 households, and 276 families living in the village. The population density was 967.6 inhabitants per square mile (373.6/km^{2}). There were 447 housing units at an average density of 449.1 per square mile (173.4/km^{2}). The racial makeup of the village was 98.44% White, 0.10% Native American, 0.42% from other races, and 1.04% from two or more races. Hispanic or Latino of any race were 0.73% of the population.

There were 403 households, out of which 34.5% had children under the age of 18 living with them, 51.6% were married couples living together, 13.4% had a female householder with no husband present, and 31.3% were non-families. 25.6% of all households were made up of individuals, and 8.9% had someone living alone who was 65 years of age or older. The average household size was 2.39 and the average family size was 2.85.

In the village, the population was spread out, with 25.8% under the age of 18, 8.1% from 18 to 24, 31.0% from 25 to 44, 23.2% from 45 to 64, and 11.9% who were 65 years of age or older. The median age was 37 years. For every 100 females there were 84.8 males. For every 100 females age 18 and over, there were 81.5 males.

The median income for a household in the village was $42,361, and the median income for a family was $47,596. Males had a median income of $36,333 versus $24,598 for females. The per capita income for the village was $19,678. About 6.2% of families and 5.9% of the population were below the poverty line, including 9.4% of those under age 18 and none of those age 65 or over.
