= Pleasantville, Ohio =

- Village
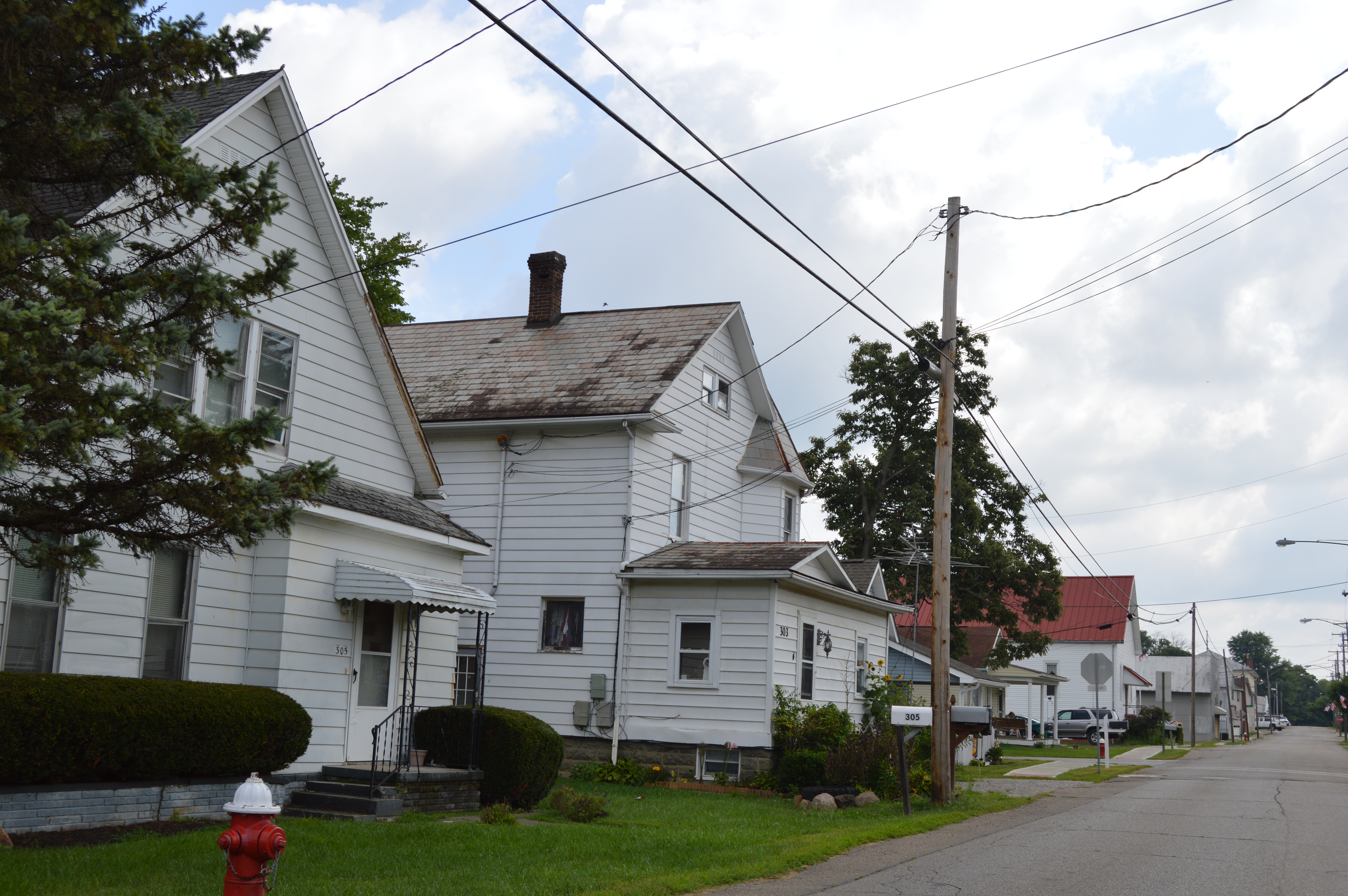
- Houses on Columbus Street

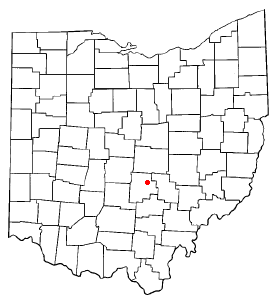
- Location of Pleasantville, Ohio

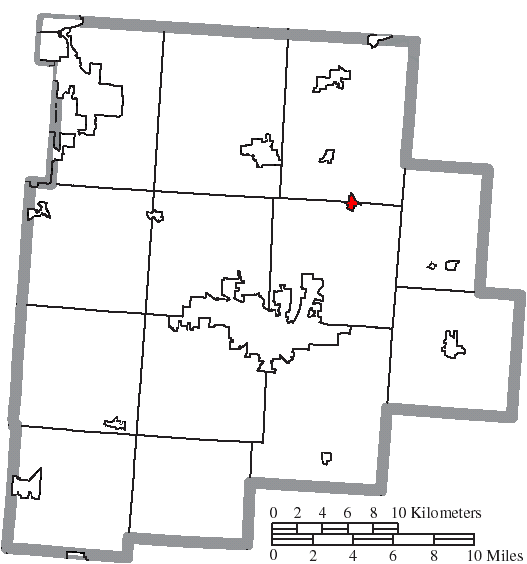
- Location of Pleasantville in Fairfield County
- Coordinates: 39°48′35″N 82°31′21″W
- Country: United States
- State: Ohio
- County: Fairfield

Area
  - Total: 0.27 sq mi (0.70 km^{2})
  - Land: 0.27 sq mi (0.70 km^{2})
  - Water: 0 sq mi (0.00 km^{2})
- Elevation: 912 ft (278 m)

Population (2020)
  - Total: 934
  - Density: 3,444.0/sq mi (1,329.75/km^{2})
- Time zone: UTC-5 (Eastern (EST))
  - Summer (DST): UTC-4 (EDT)
- ZIP code: 43148
- Area code: 740
- FIPS code: 39-63716
- GNIS feature ID: 2398987
- Website: https://www.villageofpleasantville.com/

Pleasantville is a village in Fairfield County, Ohio, United States. The population was 934 at the 2020 census.

== History ==
Pleasantville was laid out in 1828. A post office has been in operation at Pleasantville since 1828.

== Geography ==
According to the United States Census Bureau, the village has a total area of 0.27 square miles (0.70 km^{2}), all land.

== Demographics ==
Historical population
Census	Pop.	Note	%±
1880	334		—
1890	521		56.0%
1900	501		−3.8%
1910	608		21.4%
1920	479		−21.2%
1930	495		3.3%
1940	572		15.6%
1950	618		8.0%
1960	741		19.9%
1970	754		1.8%
1980	780		3.4%
1990	926		18.7%
2000	877		−5.3%
2010	960		9.5%
2020	934		−2.7%
U.S. Decennial Census

=== 2010 census ===
As of the census of 2010, there were 960 people, 358 households, and 234 families living in the village. The population density was 3,555.6 inhabitants per square mile (1,372.8/km^{2}). There were 392 housing units at an average density of 1,451.9 per square mile (560.6/km^{2}). The racial makeup of the village was 95.4% White, 0.1% African American, 0.5% Native American, 0.3% Asian, 0.5% Pacific Islander, 0.8% from other races, and 2.3% from two or more races. Hispanic or Latino of any race were 0.8% of the population.

There were 358 households, of which 39.4% had children under the age of 18 living with them, 45.3% were married couples living together, 14.8% had a female householder with no husband present, 5.3% had a male householder with no wife present, and 34.6% were non-families. 29.3% of all households were made up of individuals, and 10% had someone living alone who was 65 years of age or older. The average household size was 2.62 and the average family size was 3.29.

The median age in the village was 32.4 years. 29.9% of residents were under the age of 18; 9.5% were between the ages of 18 and 24; 28.3% were from 25 to 44; 22.2% were from 45 to 64; and 10.2% were 65 years of age or older. The gender makeup of the village was 50.0% male and 50.0% female.

=== 2000 census ===
As of the census of 2000, there were 877 people, 310 households, and 235 families living in the village. The population density was 3,155.5 inhabitants per square mile (1,218.3/km^{2}). There were 332 housing units at an average density of 1,194.5 per square mile (461.2/km^{2}). The racial makeup of the village was 97.61% White, 0.11% African American, 0.34% Native American, 0.57% Asian, 0.11% from other races, and 1.25% from two or more races. Hispanic or Latino of any race were 0.57% of the population.

There were 310 households, out of which 39.0% had children under the age of 18 living with them, 54.2% were married couples living together, 15.8% had a female householder with no husband present, and 23.9% were non-families. 20.3% of all households were made up of individuals, and 10.6% had someone living alone who was 65 years of age or older. The average household size was 2.80 and the average family size was 3.19.

In the village, the population was spread out, with 29.8% under the age of 18, 9.0% from 18 to 24, 26.6% from 25 to 44, 20.6% from 45 to 64, and 14.0% who were 65 years of age or older. The median age was 34 years. For every 100 females there were 89.4 males. For every 100 females age 18 and over, there were 93.1 males.

The median income for a household in the village was $32,150, and the median income for a family was $34,375. Males had a median income of $26,842 versus $20,268 for females. The per capita income for the village was $12,631. About 10.8% of families and 11.3% of the population were below the poverty line, including 10.4% of those under age 18 and 12.5% of those age 65 or over.
