= Canal Winchester High School =

Public high school in Canal Winchester, Ohio, United States

Location
- 300 Washington Street; Canal Winchester, (Franklin County), Ohio 43110; United States; 39.83645°N 82.8121°W

Information
- Type: Public high school
- School district: Canal Winchester Local Schools
- Superintendent: Kiya Hunt
- Principal: Ada Nicholson-Burley
- Teaching staff: 61.00 (FTE)
- Grades: 9-12
- Enrollment: 1,181 (2022-23)
- Student to teacher ratio: 19.36
- Colors: Maroon and White
- Athletics conference: Ohio Capital Conference
- Sports: Baseball, Football, Marching Band, Color Guard, Basketball, Cheerleading, Cross Country, Golf, Soccer, Swimming, Men's Croquet, Women's Wrestling, Tennis, Track & Field, Wrestling, and Volleyball.
- Mascot: Indian
- Nickname: C-Dub
- Team name: Indians
- Newspaper: The Mirror
- Website: highschool.cwschools.org

Canal Winchester is a public high school located in Canal Winchester, Ohio. The town is located 25 minutes South-East of downtown Columbus and is about 30 minutes away from historic Lancaster. It is the only high school in the Canal Winchester School District.

== Ohio High School Athletic Association State Championships ==
- Girls Volleyball - 1986

== Eastland-Fairfield Career & Technical School ==
School	Location	Satellite Locations	School Districts	Grades
Eastland-Fairfield Career & Technical Schools	Eastland: Groveport, Ohio Fairfield: Carrol, Ohio	Lincoln High School; Groveport Madison High School; New Albany High School; Pickerington High School North; Reynoldsburg High School; Canal Winchester High School	16 School Districts	11–12

== Notable alumni ==
- Sam Loucks, basketball player in the NBL during the 1930s
- Byron Mullens, basketball player in the NBA during the 2010s
