= National Register of Historic Places listings in Fairfield County, Ohio =

Location of Fairfield County in Ohio

This is a list of the National Register of Historic Places listings in Fairfield County, Ohio.

This is intended to be a complete list of the properties and districts on the National Register of Historic Places in Fairfield County, Ohio, United States. The locations of National Register properties and districts for which the latitude and longitude coordinates are included below may be seen in an online map.

There are 50 properties and districts listed on the National Register in the county, including 1 National Historic Landmark. Another 3 properties were once listed but have been removed.

This National Park Service list is complete through NPS recent listings posted September 25, 2026.

== Current listings ==
	Name on the Register	Image	Date listed	Location	City or town	Description
1	Lyman Allen House and Barn	Lyman Allen House and Barn	November 18, 1976 (#76001420)	9930 Lancaster-Circleville Rd SW; 39°41′48″N 82°47′40″W	Amanda Township	
2	John Artz Farmhouse	John Artz Farmhouse	April 23, 1987 (#87000644)	5125 Duffy Rd., east of Lancaster; 39°41′58″N 82°30′09″W	Berne Township	
3	Barr House	Barr House	November 26, 1980 (#80002995)	350 W. Main St. 39°39′04″N 82°45′04″W	Amanda	
4	John Bright Covered Bridge	John Bright Covered Bridge	May 28, 1975 (#75001393)	Spans Fetters Run on the Ohio University Lancaster campus 39°44′15″N 82°35′05″W	Lancaster	Moved from its original location, 2.5 mi (4.0 km) southwest of Baltimore, bringing Bish Rd. NW over Poplar Creek
5	John Bright No. 1 Iron Bridge	John Bright No. 1 Iron Bridge	September 20, 1978 (#78002060)	Spans Fetters Run on the Ohio University Lancaster campus 39°44′11″N 82°35′05″W	Lancaster	Moved from its original location, 2 mi (3.2 km) northeast of Carroll on Havensport Rd.
6	Samuel Bush House	Samuel Bush House	October 1, 1974 (#74001478)	1934 Cold Spring Dr. 39°44′15″N 82°37′09″W	Lancaster	
7	Chestnut Ridge Farm	Chestnut Ridge Farm	July 24, 1972 (#72001006)	3375 Cincinnati-Zanesville Rd., SW., southwest of Lancaster; 39°40′59″N 82°39′46″W	Hocking Township	
8	Concord Hall		October 25, 1972 (#72001007)	1445 Cincinnati-Zanesville Rd., SW. (U.S. Route 22), southwest of Lancaster; 39°41′56″N 82°37′45″W	Hocking Township	
9	Coon Hunters Mound	Coon Hunters Mound	May 2, 1974 (#74001475)	Grounds of the Central Ohio Coonhunters Association, 6995 Coonpath Rd.	Bloom Township	Near Carroll
10	Crawfis Institute	Crawfis Institute	November 29, 1979 (#79001833)	Crawfis and Old Sugar Grove Rds., north of Sugar Grove; 39°40′46″N 82°33′28″W	Berne Township	
11	Dairy Barn–Boys' Industrial School		June 11, 2021 (#100006636)	5900 B.I.S. Rd. 39°38′34″N 82°37′34″W	Lancaster	
12	Dilger Store	Dilger Store	August 8, 1985 (#85001691)	7640 Main St. 39°45′49″N 82°26′52″W	West Rushville	Demolished (the photo shows the empty lot)
13	J.H. Dovel Farm	J.H. Dovel Farm	March 15, 1982 (#82003566)	660 N. Hill Rd. 39°53′57″N 82°45′56″W	Pickerington	
14	Dovel-Bowers House	Dovel-Bowers House	September 2, 1993 (#93000890)	380 W. Columbus St. 39°53′05″N 82°45′56″W	Pickerington	
15	Drill Hall-Boys' Industrial School		June 11, 2021 (#100006637)	5900 B.I.S. Rd. 39°38′32″N 82°37′33″W	Lancaster	
16	Ety Enclosure		July 12, 1974 (#74001476)	Northeast of Carroll	Greenfield Township	
17	Ety Habitation Site		July 12, 1974 (#74001477)	Northeast of Carroll	Greenfield Township	
18	Fairfield County Children's Home	Fairfield County Children's Home	December 22, 2008 (#08001196)	1743 E. Main St. 39°42′53″N 82°33′49″W	Lancaster	
19	Fairfield County Infirmary	Fairfield County Infirmary	March 26, 2020 (#100005128)	1587 Granville Pike and 1651 Lancaster-Newark Rd. NE; 39°44′22″N 82°35′17″W	Lancaster	
20	Fortner Mounds I, II		July 12, 1974 (#74001481)	Northeast of Pickerington	Violet Township	
21	John Gill Farmstead	John Gill Farmstead	May 12, 1997 (#97000373)	12310 Lancaster-Newark Rd., west of Millersport; 39°54′15″N 82°33′35″W	Walnut Township	
22	Hizey Covered Bridge	Hizey Covered Bridge	October 8, 1976 (#76001423)	Private drive at 12549 Tollgate Rd. 39°54′53″N 82°42′33″W	Violet Township	Moved from its original location east of Pickerington
23	Joseph Ijams House	Joseph Ijams House	June 16, 1983 (#83001965)	7660 Main St; 39°45′50″N 82°26′51″W	West Rushville	
24	Lancaster Historic District	Lancaster Historic District	August 11, 1983 (#83003438)	Roughly bounded by 5th Ave., Penn Central railroad tracks, U.S. Route 33, and Tennant St. 39°42′49″N 82°35′54″W	Lancaster	
25	Lancaster Methodist Episcopal Camp Ground Historic District	Lancaster Methodist Episcopal Camp Ground Historic District	September 10, 1987 (#87001560)	Roughly bounded by the Hocking River, W. Fair Ave., and Ety Rd. 39°43′43″N 82°38′18″W	Lancaster	
26	Lancaster West Main Street Historic District	Lancaster West Main Street Historic District	February 28, 1979 (#79001830)	W. Main St. from Columbus to Broad St. 39°42′50″N 82°36′12″W	Lancaster	
27	John Leist House at Dutch Hollow		July 14, 2023 (#100009118)	10200 Cincinnati-Zanesville Rd. SW; 39°38′45″N 82°48′12″W	Amanda vicinity	
28	Lockville Canal Locks	Lockville Canal Locks	September 10, 1974 (#74001480)	Off Pickerington-Lockville Rd. in Lockville; 39°49′02″N 82°44′11″W	Violet Township	
29	William Medill House	William Medill House	March 30, 1978 (#78002061)	319 N. High St. 39°42′59″N 82°35′58″W	Lancaster	
30	Miller Farm	Miller Farm	May 22, 1978 (#78002058)	370 Pleasantville Rd. 39°48′56″N 82°35′18″W	Walnut Township	
31	Henry Musser House	Henry Musser House	May 5, 1978 (#78002059)	Southeast of Baltimore at 7079 Millersport Rd. 39°49′36″N 82°33′04″W	Walnut Township	
32	Ohio and Erie Canal Southern Descent Historic District		April 1, 2019 (#100003572)	Multiple; 39°50′10″N 82°37′31″W	Baltimore	Boundary increase approved September 2, 2022; extends into other Ohio counties
33	Old Maid's Orchard Mound		July 15, 1974 (#74001479)	In Chestnut Ridge Metro Park, near Lithopolis	Bloom Township	
34	Pickerington Carnegie Library	Pickerington Carnegie Library	September 2, 1993 (#93000892)	15 W. Columbus St. 39°53′02″N 82°45′13″W	Pickerington	
35	Pickerington Depot	Pickerington Depot	July 26, 1990 (#90001119)	50 N. Center St. 39°53′07″N 82°45′15″W	Pickerington	
36	Pugh-Kittle House	Pugh-Kittle House	June 16, 1983 (#83001964)	2140 Bickel Church Rd., northeast of Baltimore; 39°52′14″N 82°32′40″W	Walnut Township	
37	Valentine Reber House	Valentine Reber House	July 30, 1975 (#75001395)	West of Lancaster at 8325 Lancaster-Circleville Rd. (State Route 188); 39°42′26″N 82°45′41″W	Amanda Township	
38	Rock Mill	Rock Mill	June 1, 1990 (#90000850)	Rock Mill Rd. on the southern bank of the Hocking River, northwest of Lancaster; 39°44′54″N 82°42′47″W	Bloom Township	
39	Rock Mill Covered Bridge	Rock Mill Covered Bridge	April 26, 1976 (#76001424)	State Route 41 at Rock Mill; 39°44′56″N 82°42′48″W	Bloom Township	
40	Royalton House		July 30, 1975 (#75001396)	8691 Royalton Rd., SW. 39°43′33″N 82°46′02″W	Amanda Township	
41	Rushville Historic District	Rushville Historic District	November 24, 1980 (#80002996)	Bremen Ave., Main and Market Sts. 39°45′51″N 82°25′51″W	Rushville	Historic district including 87 contributing buildings.
42	St. Peter's Evangelical Lutheran Church	St. Peter's Evangelical Lutheran Church	April 16, 1979 (#79001831)	Broad and Mullberry Sts. 39°42′59″N 82°36′06″W	Lancaster	
43	Theodore B. Schaer Mound		June 20, 1975 (#75001394)	Southeast of Canal Winchester	Violet Township	
44	John Sherman Birthplace	John Sherman Birthplace	October 15, 1966 (#66000609)	137 E. Main St. 39°42′50″N 82°36′02″W	Lancaster	
45	Square 13 Historic District	Square 13 Historic District	July 24, 1972 (#72001008)	Roughly the area along Broad and High Sts. between Mulberry and Chestnut Sts. 39°42′52″N 82°36′02″W	Lancaster	
46	Tallmadge-Mithoff House	Tallmadge-Mithoff House	May 6, 1976 (#76001422)	720 Lincoln Ave. (now Mithoff Dr.); 39°42′32″N 82°37′00″W	Lancaster	
47	Tarlton Cross Mound	Tarlton Cross Mound	November 10, 1970 (#70000489)	Tarlton State Park, northwest of Tarlton; 39°33′44″N 82°47′07″W	Clear Creek Township	
48	Wagnalls Memorial	Wagnalls Memorial	December 8, 2022 (#100008437)	150 SE Columbus St. 39°48′07″N 82°48′21″W	Lithopolis	
49	Willow Lane Farm	Willow Lane Farm	October 26, 1972 (#72001009)	Southwest of Lancaster on U.S. Route 22; 39°41′34″N 82°38′42″W	Hocking Township	
50	Winegardner Village	Winegardner Village	July 30, 1974 (#74001482)	On a bluff above Little Rush Creek, east of the junction of Gun Barrel and Miller Siding Rds. 39°47′55″N 82°26′21″W	Richland Township	Near Rushville

== Former listings ==
	Name on the Register	Image	Date listed	Date removed	Location	City or town	Description
1	Blacklick Covered Bridge		April 11, 1977 (#77001585)	May 23, 1978	Tussing Rd., west of State Route 256	Pickerington	Destroyed by overweight truck on August 31, 1978.
2	Loucks Covered Bridge		October 8, 1976 (#76001421)	October 29, 1985	Southeast of Canal Winchester on State Route 207	Canal Winchester	
3	Stemen Road Covered Bridge		July 23, 1979 (#79001832)	October 29, 1985	Northeast of Pickerington over Sycamore Creek	Pickerington	Destroyed by overweight truck on December 2, 1978.

== See also ==
- List of National Historic Landmarks in Ohio
- Listings in neighboring counties: Franklin, Hocking, Licking, Perry, Pickaway
- National Register of Historic Places listings in Ohio
