= Old Maid's Orchard Mound =

Archaeological site in Ohio, United States

- U.S. National Register of Historic Places
- Location: Chestnut Ridge Metro Park
- Nearest city: Lithopolis, Ohio
- Area: 1 acre (0.40 ha)
- NRHP reference No.: 74001479
- Added to NRHP: July 15, 1974

The Old Maid's Orchard Mound is a Native American mound in the central portion of the U.S. state of Ohio. Located near the village of Lithopolis in Fairfield County, the mound lies within the boundaries of Chestnut Ridge Metro Park, in northern Bloom Township.

One of several burial mounds east of Lithopolis, the Old Maid's Orchard Mound sits in an area of small fruit trees and underbrush. Measuring 8 feet (2.4 m) tall, it has changed little with the passage of time; cultivation of the area around the orchard damaged its northern side, and rodents have dug holes in the mound, but its integrity has been little compromised. Archaeologists have concluded that the mound was constructed by people of the Adena culture, due to its location and its shape. Mounds built by the Adena people typically cover burials, postholes that formed the foundations of houses, or other manmade features; as a result, the Old Maid's Orchard Mound is a valuable archaeological site. In recognition of its archaeological significance, the mound was listed on the National Register of Historic Places in 1974. It is one of five Fairfield County mound sites to be included on the Register, along with the Theodore B. Schaer Mound near Canal Winchester, the Tarlton Cross Mound near Tarlton, the Coon Hunters Mound near Carroll, and the Fortner Mounds near Pickerington.
