= ETY =

ETY or Ety may refer to:

== Ety ==
- Ety Habitation Site, archaeological site in Ohio, United States
  - Ety Enclosure, name for geometric earthworks near Ety Habitation Site

== ETY ==
- ETY Triumph, motorcycle used in the 1970 Isle of Man TT
- ETY, code for East Troy Amtrak railway station
