= Coon Hunters Mound =

Archaeological site in Ohio, United States

- U.S. National Register of Historic Places
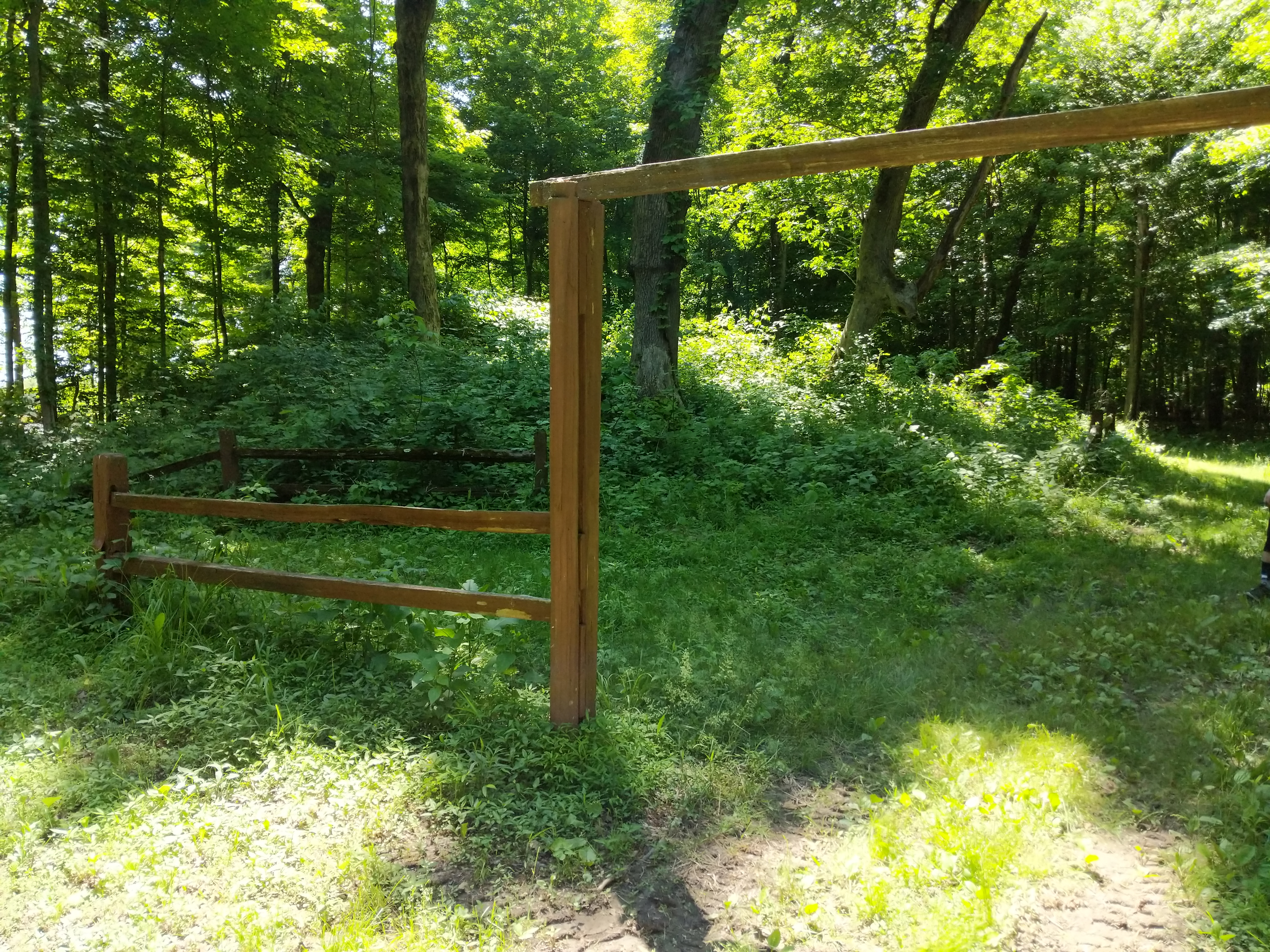
- Location: Grounds of the Central Ohio Coonhunters Association, 6995 Coonpath Road
- Nearest city: Carroll, Ohio
- Area: 1 acre (0.40 ha)
- NRHP reference No.: 74001475
- Added to NRHP: May 2, 1974

The Coon Hunters Mound is a Native American mound in the central part of the U.S. state of Ohio. Located near the village of Carroll, it sits on the grounds of the Central Ohio Coonhunters Association.

The Coon Hunters Mound is a large structure, measuring 5.5 feet (1.7 m) high and 65 feet (20 m) in diameter at its base. Due to its shape and location, it is believed to have been built by people of the Adena culture, who inhabited southern and central Ohio from approximately 500 BC to approximately AD 400. Mounds such as Coon Hunters were typically constructed as burial mounds atop the graves of leading members of Adena society. For this reason, although the mound has never been excavated, it is believed to contain postholes from a burial structure and a range of grave goods.

Due to its potentially information-rich contents, the Coon Hunters Mound is a valuable archaeological site. In recognition of its archaeological significance, it was listed on the National Register of Historic Places in 1974. It is one of five Fairfield County mound sites to be included on the Register, along with the Old Maid's Orchard Mound near Lithopolis, the Tarlton Cross Mound near Tarlton, the Theodore B. Schaer Mound near Canal Winchester, and the Fortner Mounds near Pickerington. Also located near Carroll are two other archaeological sites, known as the Ety Enclosure and the Ety Habitation Site; they are associated with the later Hopewellian peoples, who inhabited the region after the Adena.
