= Fortner Mounds =

Archaeological site in Ohio, United States

- Fortner Mounds I, II
- U.S. National Register of Historic Places
- Nearest city: Pickerington, Ohio
- Area: 3 acres (1.2 ha)
- NRHP reference No.: 74001481
- Added to NRHP: July 12, 1974

The Fortner Mounds are a pair of Native American mounds in the central part of the U.S. state of Ohio. Located northeast of the city of Pickerington in Fairfield County, they are two of several mounds in the Pickerington vicinity, but the only pair of mounds in the area. As such, they are of special interest to archaeologists: some of the mound-building peoples of prehistoric North America lived in groups of two or three houses, which were often covered with piles of earth when the families would move to other places. Therefore, it is likely that these mounds cover groups of postholes, and buried bodies may also be located within them. From their shape, it is apparent that the mounds were constructed by people of the Adena culture, who lived in central Ohio between approximately 500 BC and AD 400.

Because the Fortner Mounds are likely to cover both the remains of houses and of these houses' inhabitants, they compose a significant archaeological site. In recognition of their archaeological value, the two mounds were listed on the National Register of Historic Places in mid-1974. They are one of five Fairfield County mound sites to be included on the Register, along with the Theodore B. Schaer Mound near Canal Winchester, the Tarlton Cross Mound near Tarlton, the Coon Hunters Mound near Carroll, and the Old Maid's Orchard Mound near Lithopolis.
