= John Artz Farmhouse =

Historic house in Ohio, United States

- U.S. National Register of Historic Places
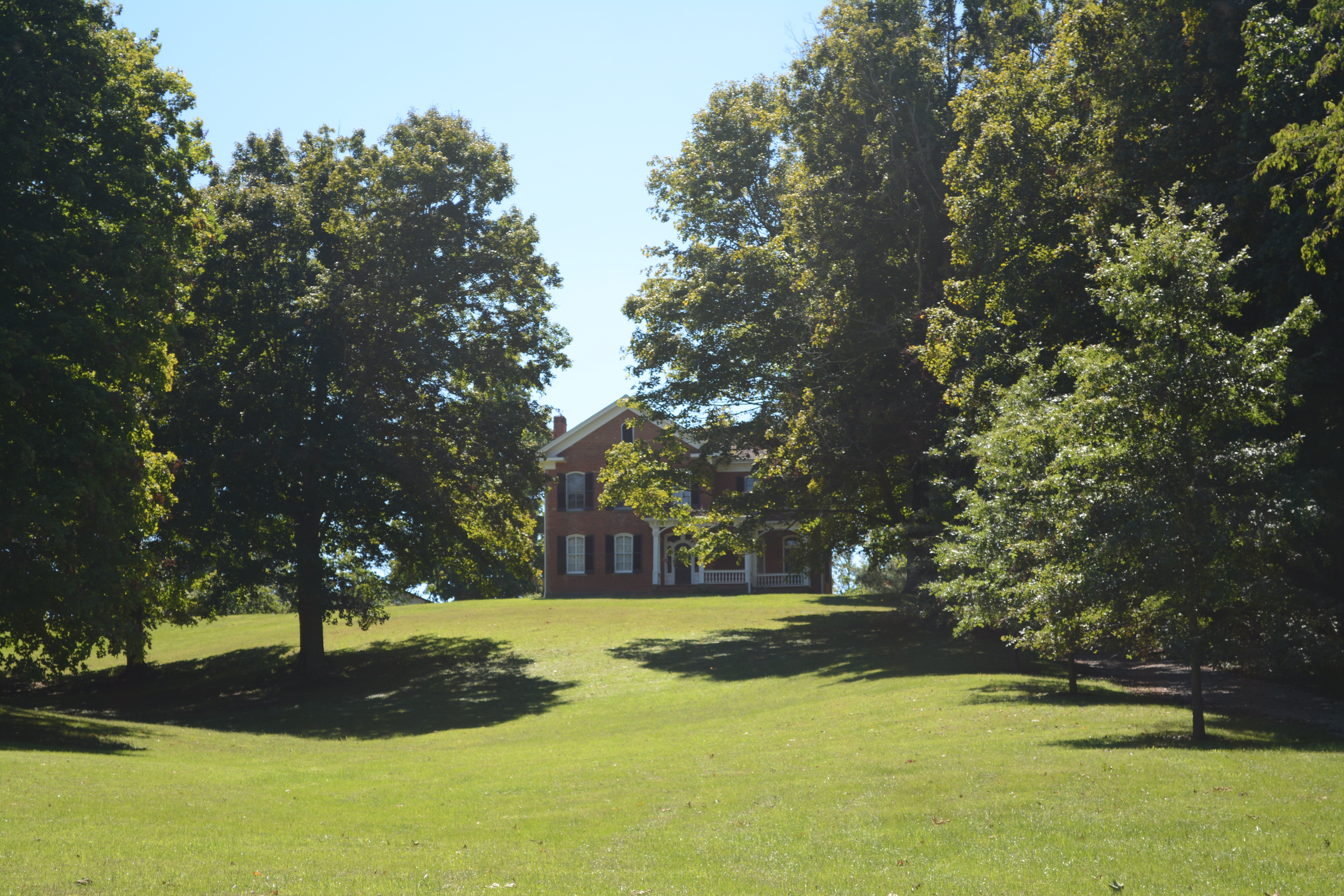
- The farmhouse in 2016

- Location within Ohio Location within the United States
- Location: 5125 Duffy Rd., Berne
- Coordinates: 39°42′18.48″N 82°30′17.32″W
- Built: 1857
- Architectural style: Greek Revival and Italianate
- NRHP reference No.: 87000644
- Added to NRHP: 23 April 1987

John Artz Farmhouse is a historic building located at 5125 Duffy Road Berne, Ohio near Lancaster.

== Description and history ==
The farmhouse is a two-story brick building with a gable front and two story wing illustrating the transition between the Greek Revival and Italianate styles. The front gable has a plain entablature with returning cornice at the top. The double hung four over four window display Italianate influences with segmental arches and brick voussoirs. Sidelights flank the wood panel door. Interior features are well preserved and include a central staircase with turned balusters, large wood fireplace mantles and wood trim. This trim is constructed of cherry and walnut wood and the flooring is hardwood chestnut. Many of the farmhouse's thirty-three window retain original glazing.

The property the house occupies was obtained by Jacob Artz in 1818 not long after he came to Fairfield County from Rockingham County, Virginia. He built a log cabin on the property, then spring and smoke houses. His son John Artz built the farmhouse between 1857 and 1860. He occupied the farmhouse from its construction until 1895. It was listed in the National Register of Historic Places on April 23, 1987.

== See also ==
- History of Ohio
- Ohio History Connection
- National Register of Historic Places listings in Fairfield County, Ohio
