= Theodore B. Schaer Mound =

Archaeological site in Ohio, United States

- U.S. National Register of Historic Places
- Nearest city: Canal Winchester, Ohio
- Area: 3 acres (1.2 ha)
- NRHP reference No.: 75001394
- Added to NRHP: June 20, 1975

The Theodore B. Schaer Mound is a Native American mound in the central part of the U.S. state of Ohio. Located southeast of the city of Canal Winchester in Fairfield County, it is a large mound; its height is 13 feet (4.0 m), and it is 60 feet (18 m) in diameter. Today, the mound sits in woodland, being covered with brush and trees. Since white settlement of the region, the mound has seen few changes: individuals hunting for Indian relics have damaged it slightly, but the most significant effects have been minor natural phenomena such as the diggings of groundhogs.

Although the mound was surely constructed during the Woodland period, the cultural affiliation of its builders is unknown. Both the Hopewell and the Adena cultures built burial mounds like the Schaer Mound in central Ohio, but their works are typically distinguishable with the eye: the Hopewell preferred the valleys of the major rivers for their subconical mounds, while the Adena favored high ground near small watercourses for their conical mounds. Because it shares some characteristics of each culture's typical architecture, the Schaer Mound's builders cannot precisely be identified.

Despite the difficulty of naming those who built it, the Schaer Mound is a valuable archaeological site. Because no excavation has ever been conducted there, its original contents are likely still to be interred within, and those mounds that combine Adena and Hopewell characteristics have often been found to yield the most significant amounts of information. In recognition of its archaeological value, the Schaer Mound was listed on the National Register of Historic Places in 1975. It is one of five Fairfield County mound sites to be included on the Register, along with the Old Maid's Orchard Mound near Lithopolis, the Tarlton Cross Mound near Tarlton, the Coon Hunters Mound near Carroll, and the Fortner Mounds near Pickerington.
