= Madison Township, Fairfield County, Ohio =

Township in Ohio, US

- Township
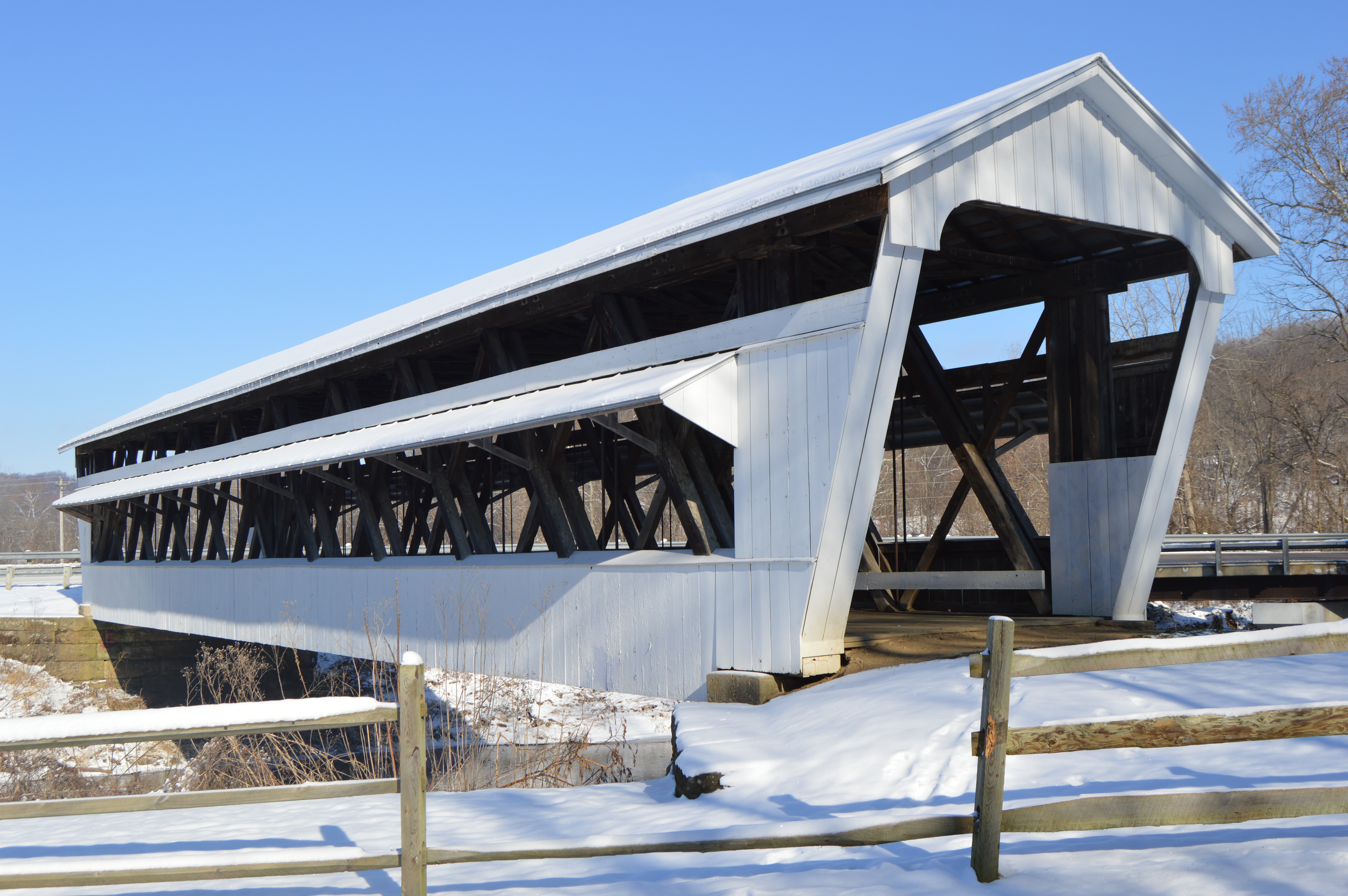
- One of the township's preserved covered bridges

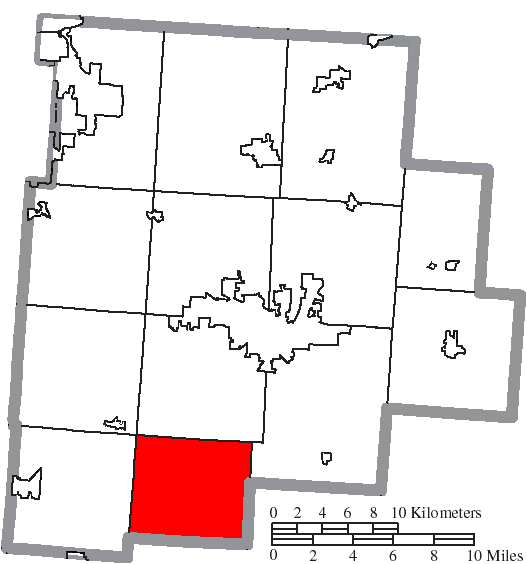
- Location of Madison Township in Fairfield County
- Coordinates: 39°37′0″N 82°40′3″W
- Country: United States
- State: Ohio
- County: Fairfield

Area
  - Total: 29.5 sq mi (76.5 km^{2})
  - Land: 29.5 sq mi (76.3 km^{2})
  - Water: 0.12 sq mi (0.3 km^{2})
- Elevation: 1,060 ft (323 m)

Population (2020)
  - Total: 1,770
  - Density: 60.1/sq mi (23.2/km^{2})
- Time zone: UTC-5 (Eastern (EST))
  - Summer (DST): UTC-4 (EDT)
- FIPS code: 39-46382
- GNIS feature ID: 1086080

Madison Township is one of the thirteen townships of Fairfield County, Ohio, United States. As of the 2020 census the population was 1,770.

== Geography ==
Located in the southern part of the county, it borders the following townships:

- Hocking Township - north
- Berne Township - northeast
- Good Hope Township, Hocking County - southeast
- Perry Township, Hocking County - south
- Clearcreek Township - west
- Amanda Township - northwest corner

No municipalities are located in Madison Township.

== Name and history ==
It is one of twenty Madison Townships statewide.

== Government ==
The township is governed by a three-member board of trustees, who are elected in November of odd-numbered years to a four-year term beginning on the following January 1. Two are elected in the year after the presidential election and one is elected in the year before it. There is also an elected township fiscal officer, who serves a four-year term beginning on April 1 of the year after the election, which is held in November of the year before the presidential election. Vacancies in the fiscal officership or on the board of trustees are filled by the remaining trustees.
