= Clearcreek Township, Fairfield County, Ohio =

Township in Ohio, US

- Township
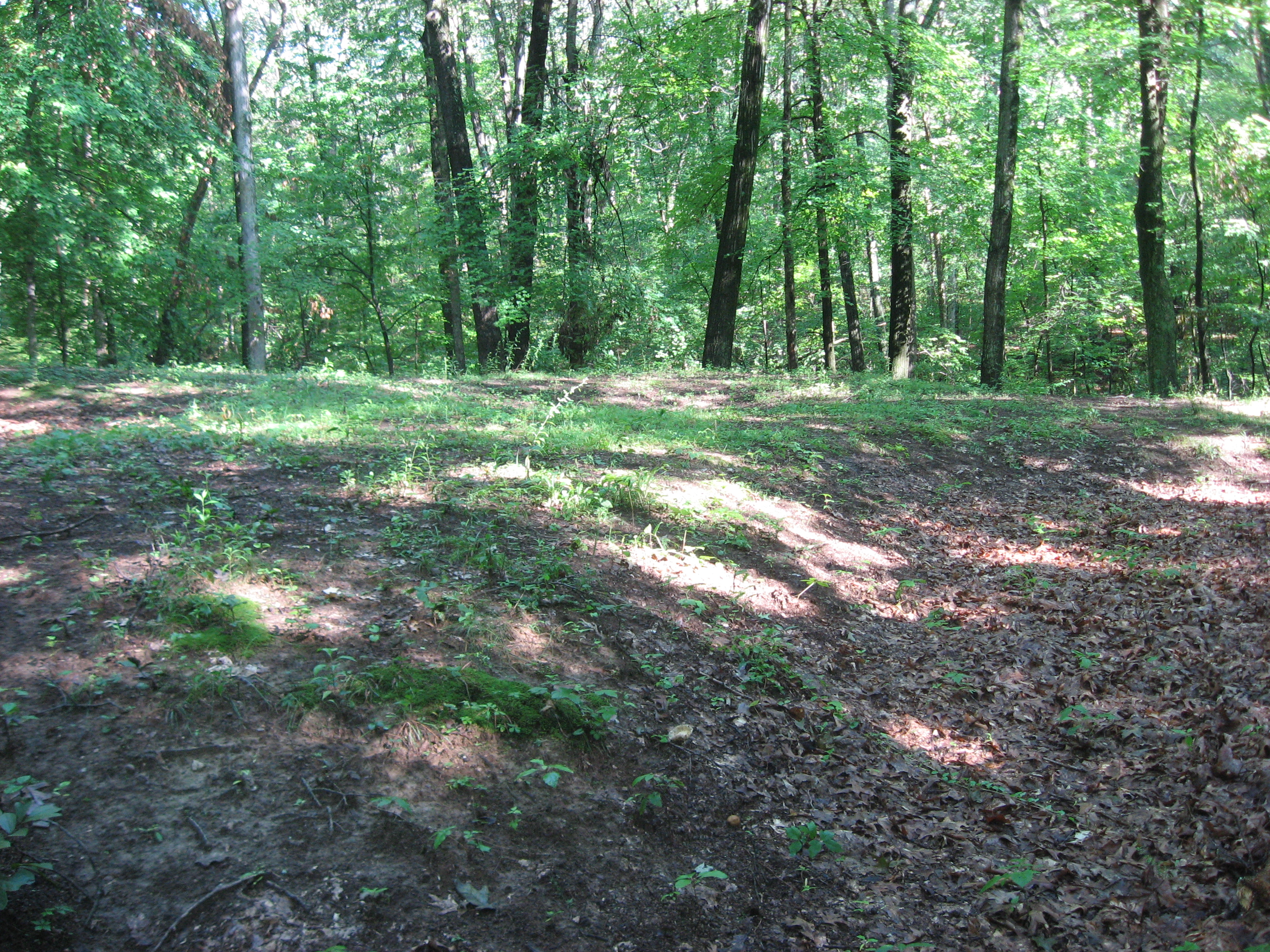
- Tarlton Cross Mound

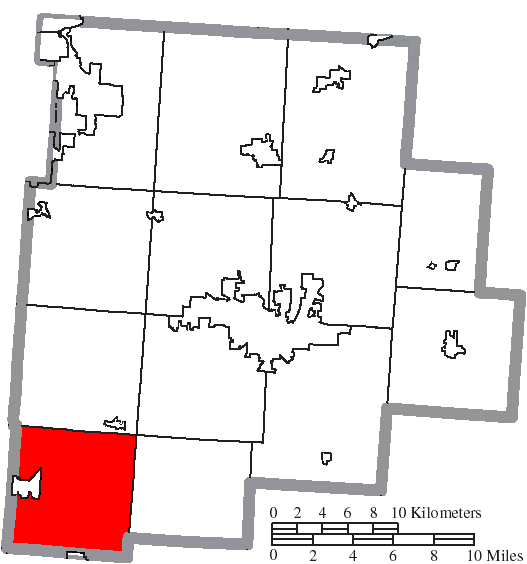
- Location of Clearcreek Township in Fairfield County
- Coordinates: 39°37′4″N 82°47′37″W
- Country: United States
- State: Ohio
- County: Fairfield

Area
  - Total: 36.3 sq mi (94.1 km^{2})
  - Land: 36.3 sq mi (94.0 km^{2})
  - Water: 0.039 sq mi (0.1 km^{2})
- Elevation: 997 ft (304 m)

Population (2020)
  - Total: 4,084
  - Density: 113/sq mi (43.4/km^{2})
- Time zone: UTC-5 (Eastern (EST))
  - Summer (DST): UTC-4 (EDT)
- FIPS code: 39-15686
- GNIS feature ID: 1086075
- Website: https://www.clearcreektownshipohio.com/

Clearcreek Township is one of the thirteen townships of Fairfield County, Ohio, United States. As of the 2020 census the population was 4,084.

== Geography ==
Located in the southwestern corner of the county, it borders the following townships:

- Amanda Township - north
- Hocking Township - northeast corner
- Madison Township - east
- Perry Township, Hocking County - southeast
- Salt Creek Township, Pickaway County - south
- Pickaway Township, Pickaway County - southwest corner
- Washington Township, Pickaway County - west

The village of Stoutsville is located in western Clearcreek Township.

== Name and history ==
Statewide, the only other Clearcreek Township is located in Warren County.

== Government ==
The township is governed by a three-member board of trustees, who are elected in November of odd-numbered years to a four-year term beginning on the following January 1. Two are elected in the year after the presidential election and one is elected in the year before it. There is also an elected township fiscal officer, who serves a four-year term beginning on April 1 of the year after the election, which is held in November of the year before the presidential election. Vacancies in the fiscal officership or on the board of trustees are filled by the remaining trustees.
