= Perry Township, Hocking County, Ohio =

Township in Ohio, US

- Township
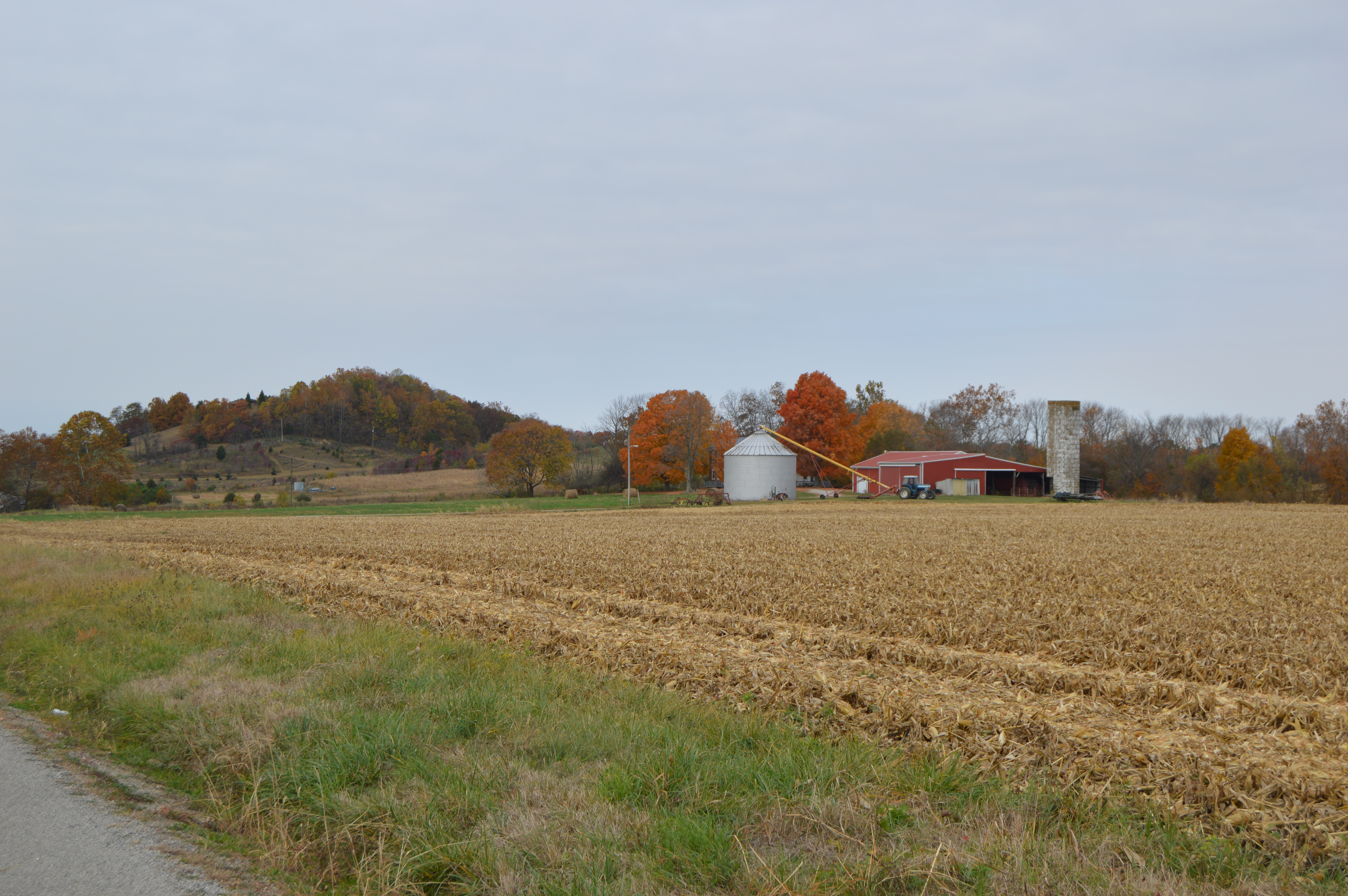
- Along Bailor Road, north of Laurelville

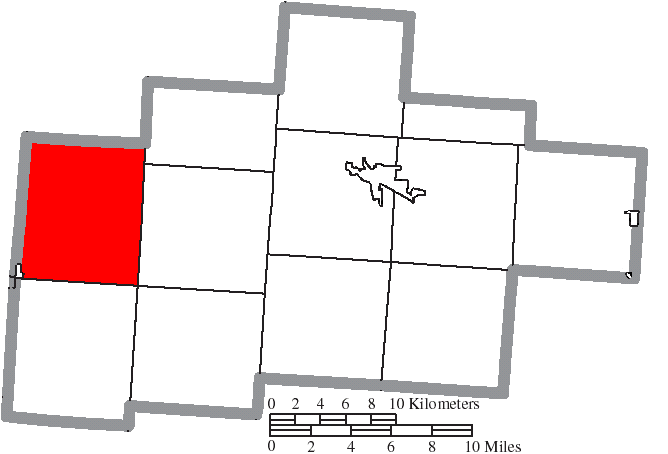
- Location of Perry Township in Hocking County
- Coordinates: 39°29′52″N 82°42′4″W
- Country: United States
- State: Ohio
- County: Hocking

Area
  - Total: 42.12 sq mi (109.08 km^{2})
  - Land: 42.06 sq mi (108.94 km^{2})
  - Water: 0.054 sq mi (0.14 km^{2})
- Elevation: 784 ft (239 m)

Population (2020)
  - Total: 2,408
  - Density: 57.25/sq mi (22.10/km^{2})
- Time zone: UTC-5 (Eastern (EST))
  - Summer (DST): UTC-4 (EDT)
- FIPS code: 39-61868
- GNIS feature ID: 1086322

Perry Township is one of the eleven townships of Hocking County, Ohio, United States. As of the 2020 census the population was 2,408.

== Geography ==
Located in the northwestern corner of the county, it borders the following townships:

- Madison Township, Fairfield County - north
- Good Hope Township - northeast
- Laurel Township - east
- Benton Township - southeast corner
- Salt Creek Township - south
- Colerain Township, Ross County - southwest corner
- Salt Creek Township, Pickaway County - west
- Clearcreek Township, Fairfield County - northwest

The small village of Laurelville is located in Perry Township's southwestern corner.

== Name and history ==
It is one of twenty-six Perry Townships statewide.

While Hocking County itself was created in 1818, it had different boundaries from those of today. Perry Township was not a part of Hocking then. It remained a part of Fairfield County until 1850. At that time, the creation of Vinton County south of Hocking County took some of Hocking County's acreage. To recompense Hocking County for its loss, Perry Township was taken from Madison Township of Fairfield and given to Hocking County. Also, the bottom tier of Madison Township, Sections 31–36, was removed from Madison Township of Fairfield County and attached to Perry Township of Hocking County. As a result, Perry Township today has 42 Sections instead of the usual 36, and it has two each of Sections 31–36, one of each at the top (north) of the township and one of each at the bottom (south).

== Government ==
The township is governed by a three-member board of trustees, who are elected in November of odd-numbered years to a four-year term beginning on the following January 1. Two are elected in the year after the presidential election and one is elected in the year before it. There is also an elected township fiscal officer, who serves a four-year term beginning on April 1 of the year after the election, which is held in November of the year before the presidential election. Vacancies in the fiscal officership or on the board of trustees are filled by the remaining trustees.
