= Southeastern Correctional Institution =

Prison in Ohio, United States

Coordinates: 39°38′32″N 82°37′34″W

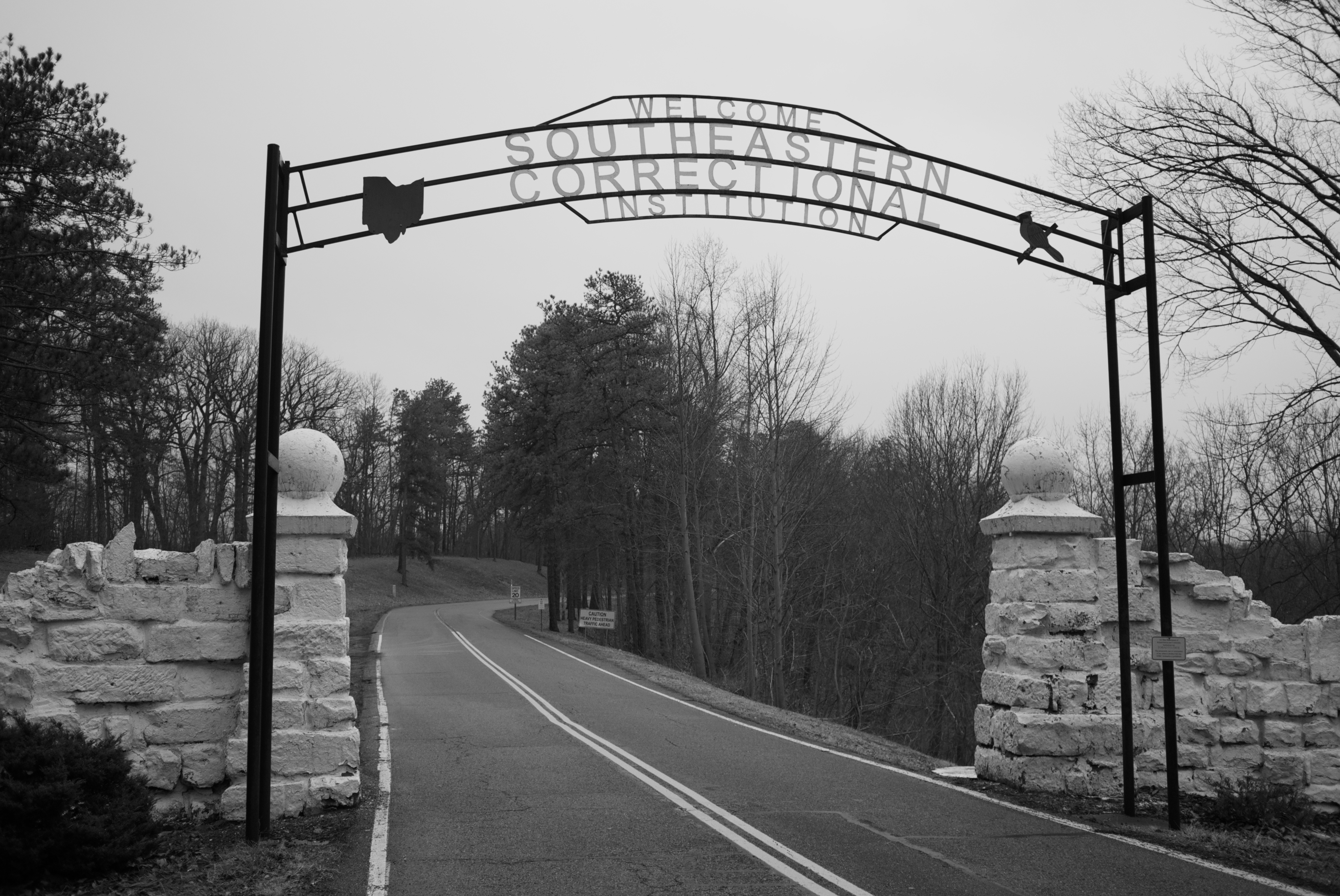
- The entrance gate to the Southeastern Correctional Institution on South Broad Street (Ohio Route 793)
- Interactive map of Southeastern Correctional Institution
- Location: 5900 Boys Industrial School Road Hocking Township, Ohio
- Status: Open
- Capacity: 2034
- Opened: 1980
- Managed by: Ohio Department of Rehabilitation and Correction

Southeastern Correctional Institution is an Ohio prison located at 5900 Boys Industrial School Road in Hocking Township, Fairfield County, six miles south of Lancaster, Ohio. The facility originally opened as Boys Industrial School, a reform school for male juvenile offenders. It currently (as of August 6, 2013) houses 2,034 inmates with either minimum or medium security levels.

== History ==
The Southeastern Correctional Institution was originally founded as the Boys Industrial School in 1857. The facility taught juvenile offenders and trained them in vocations. The Boys Industrial School became the Fairfield School for Boys in 1964 and in 1980 rebranded as the Southeastern Correctional Institution.
