= Madison Township, Ohio =

Madison Township, Ohio may refer to:

- Madison Township, Butler County, Ohio
- Madison Township, Clark County, Ohio
- Madison Township, Columbiana County, Ohio
- Madison Township, Fairfield County, Ohio
- Madison Township, Fayette County, Ohio
- Madison Township, Franklin County, Ohio
- Madison Township, Guernsey County, Ohio
- Madison Township, Hancock County, Ohio
- Madison Township, Highland County, Ohio
- Madison Township, Jackson County, Ohio
- Madison Township, Lake County, Ohio
- Madison Township, Licking County, Ohio
- Madison Township, Montgomery County, Ohio
- Madison Township, Muskingum County, Ohio
- Madison Township, Perry County, Ohio
- Madison Township, Pickaway County, Ohio
- Madison Township, Richland County, Ohio
- Madison Township, Sandusky County, Ohio
- Madison Township, Scioto County, Ohio
- Madison Township, Vinton County, Ohio
- Madison Township, Williams County, Ohio

== See also ==
- Madison Township (disambiguation)
