= Hocking Township, Fairfield County, Ohio =

Township in Ohio, US

- Township
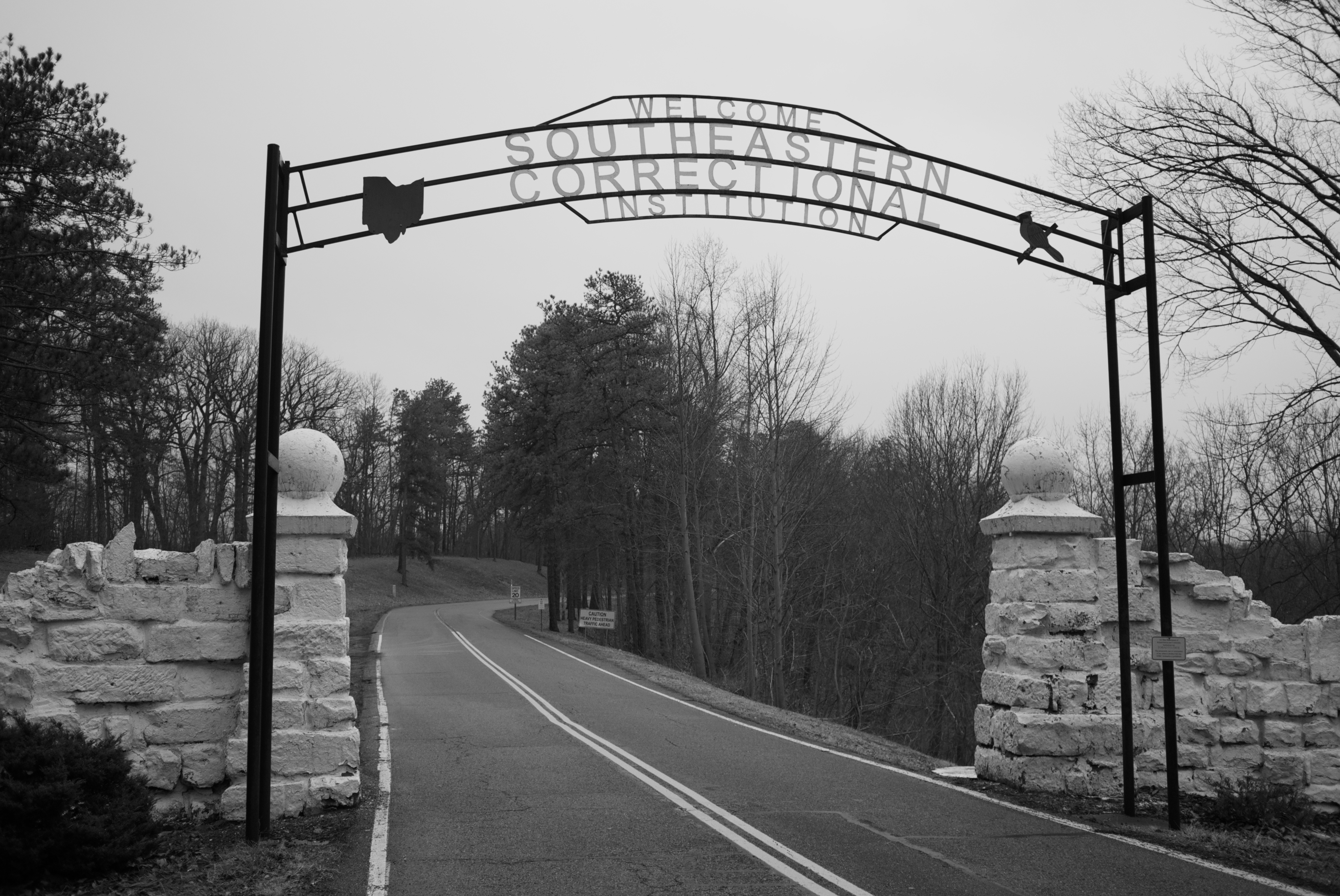
- Entrance to the Southeastern Correctional Institution

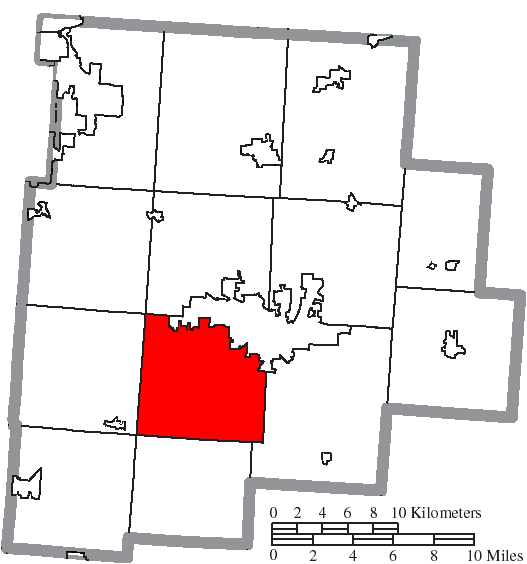
- Location of Hocking Township in Fairfield County
- Coordinates: 39°40′56″N 82°40′12″W
- Country: United States
- State: Ohio
- County: Fairfield

Area
  - Total: 32.9 sq mi (85.3 km^{2})
  - Land: 32.8 sq mi (85.0 km^{2})
  - Water: 0.12 sq mi (0.3 km^{2})
- Elevation: 968 ft (295 m)

Population (2020)
  - Total: 4,850
  - Density: 148/sq mi (57.1/km^{2})
- Time zone: UTC-5 (Eastern (EST))
  - Summer (DST): UTC-4 (EDT)
- ZIP code: 43130
- Area codes: 220 and 740
- FIPS code: 39-35812
- GNIS feature ID: 1086077
- Website: www.hockingtownship.org

Hocking Township is one of the thirteen townships of Fairfield County, Ohio, United States. As of the 2020 census the population was 4,850.

== Geography ==
Located in the southern part of the county, it borders the following townships:

- Greenfield Township - north
- Pleasant Township - northeast corner
- Berne Township - east
- Madison Township - south
- Clearcreek Township - southwest corner
- Amanda Township - west
- Bloom Township - northwest corner

Much of northeastern Hocking Township is occupied by the city of Lancaster, the county seat of Fairfield County.

== Name and history ==
It is the only Hocking Township statewide.

== Government ==
The township is governed by a three-member board of trustees, who are elected in November of odd-numbered years to a four-year term beginning on the following January 1. Two are elected in the year after the presidential election and one is elected in the year before it. There is also an elected township fiscal officer, who serves a four-year term beginning on April 1 of the year after the election, which is held in November of the year before the presidential election. Vacancies in the fiscal officership or on the board of trustees are filled by the remaining trustees.
