= West Rushville, Ohio =

- Village
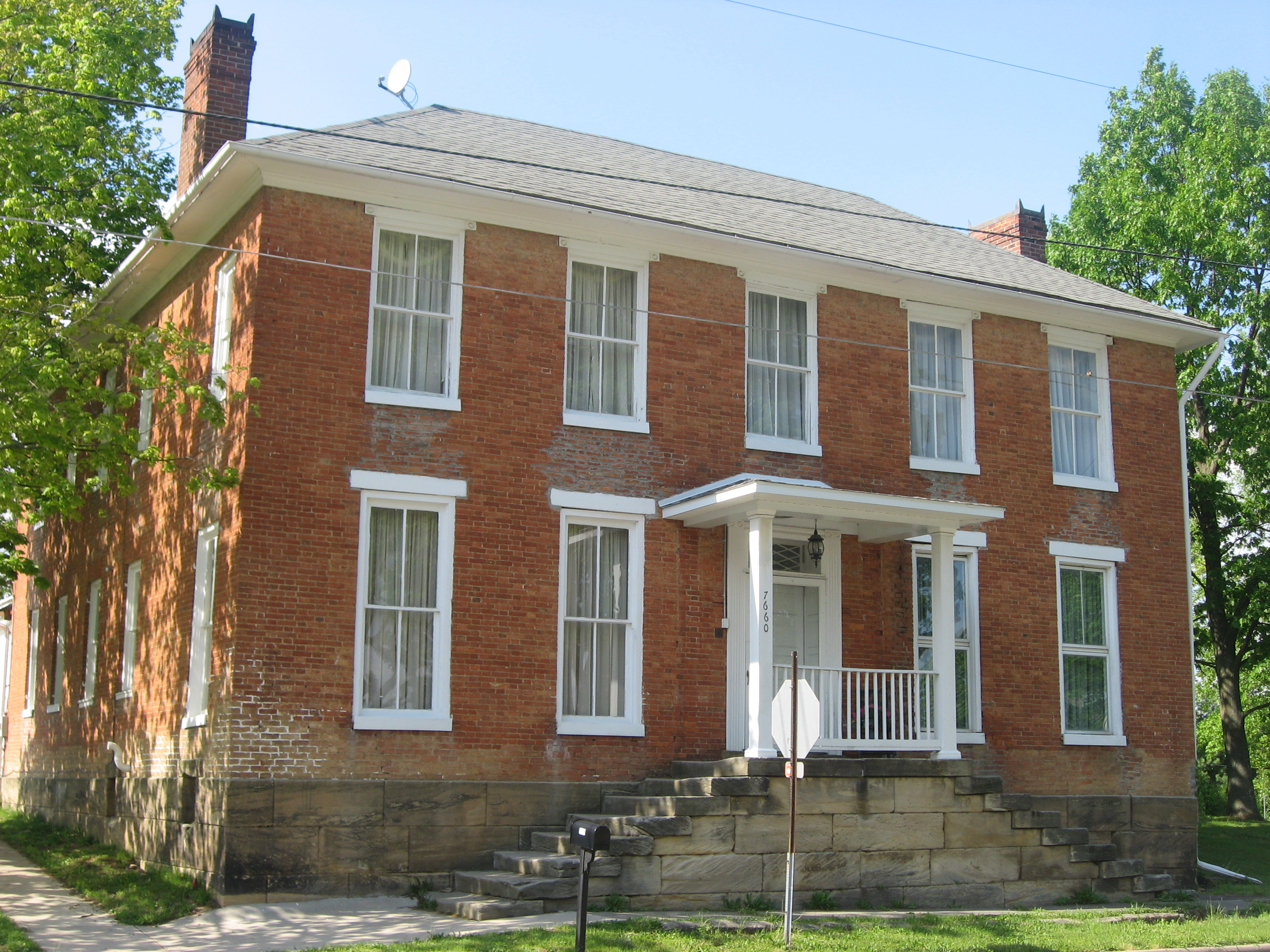
- Joseph Ijams House, built 1810

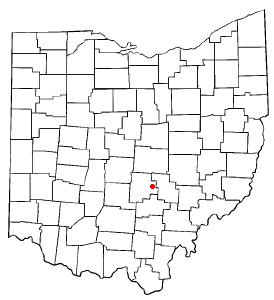
- Location of West Rushville, Ohio

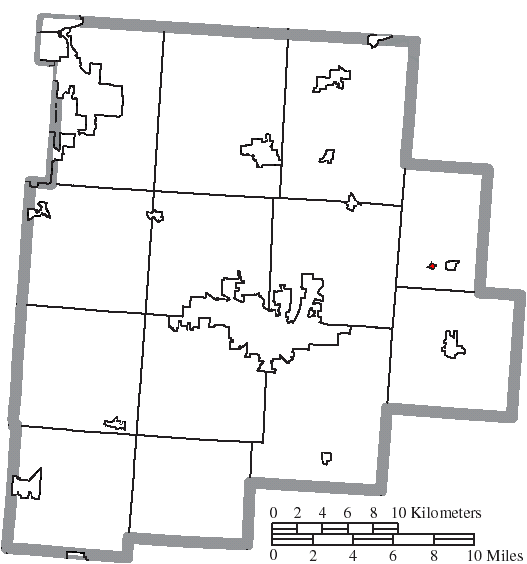
- Location of West Rushville in Fairfield County
- Coordinates: 39°45′50″N 82°26′54″W
- Country: United States
- State: Ohio
- County: Fairfield

Area
  - Total: 0.066 sq mi (0.17 km^{2})
  - Land: 0.066 sq mi (0.17 km^{2})
  - Water: 0 sq mi (0.00 km^{2})
- Elevation: 1,017 ft (310 m)

Population (2020)
  - Total: 166
  - Density: 2,560.2/sq mi (988.51/km^{2})
- Time zone: UTC-5 (Eastern (EST))
  - Summer (DST): UTC-4 (EDT)
- ZIP code: 43150
- Area code: 740
- FIPS code: 39-84182
- GNIS feature ID: 2400142

West Rushville is a village in Fairfield County, Ohio, United States. The population was 166 at the 2020 census.

== History ==
A post office called West Rushville was established in 1842, and remained in operation until 1996. The village was named for its location on the west bank of Little Rush Creek, which separates the villages of Rushville and West Rushville.

== Geography ==
According to the United States Census Bureau, the village has a total area of 0.07 square miles (0.18 km^{2}), all land.

== Demographics ==
Historical population
Census	Pop.	Note	%±
1870	185		—
1880	212		14.6%
1890	195		−8.0%
1900	161		−17.4%
1910	147		−8.7%
1920	142		−3.4%
1930	138		−2.8%
1940	149		8.0%
1950	152		2.0%
1960	174		14.5%
1970	189		8.6%
1980	159		−15.9%
1990	134		−15.7%
2000	132		−1.5%
2010	134		1.5%
2020	166		23.9%
U.S. Decennial Census

=== 2010 census ===
As of the census of 2010, there were 134 people, 51 households, and 38 families living in the village. The population density was 1,914.3 inhabitants per square mile (739.1/km^{2}). There were 62 housing units at an average density of 885.7 per square mile (342.0/km^{2}). The racial makeup of the village was 97.0% White and 3.0% from two or more races. Hispanic or Latino of any race were 0.7% of the population.

There were 51 households, of which 39.2% had children under the age of 18 living with them, 52.9% were married couples living together, 11.8% had a female householder with no husband present, 9.8% had a male householder with no wife present, and 25.5% were non-families. 21.6% of all households were made up of individuals, and 11.8% had someone living alone who was 65 years of age or older. The average household size was 2.63 and the average family size was 3.00.

The median age in the village was 36 years. 29.1% of residents were under the age of 18; 8.9% were between the ages of 18 and 24; 28.4% were from 25 to 44; 24.7% were from 45 to 64; and 9% were 65 years of age or older. The gender makeup of the village was 50.7% male and 49.3% female.

=== 2000 census ===
As of the census of 2000, there were 132 people, 49 households, and 38 families living in the village. The population density was 2,174.2 inhabitants per square mile (839.5/km^{2}). There were 50 housing units at an average density of 823.6 per square mile (318.0/km^{2}). The racial makeup of the village was 99.24% White, and 0.76% from two or more races. Hispanic or Latino of any race were 3.03% of the population.

There were 49 households, out of which 49.0% had children under the age of 18 living with them, 61.2% were married couples living together, 10.2% had a female householder with no husband present, and 22.4% were non-families. 20.4% of all households were made up of individuals, and 12.2% had someone living alone who was 65 years of age or older. The average household size was 2.69 and the average family size was 3.05. In the village, the population was spread out, with 31.1% under the age of 18, 9.1% from 18 to 24, 31.8% from 25 to 44, 19.7% from 45 to 64, and 8.3% who were 65 years of age or older. The median age was 33 years. For every 100 females there were 100.0 males. For every 100 females age 18 and over, there were 97.8 males.

The median income for a household in the village was $43,125, and the median income for a family was $56,500. Males had a median income of $28,125 versus $30,000 for females. The per capita income for the village was $16,257. There were 5.0% of families and 6.2% of the population living below the poverty line, including 15.2% of under eighteens and none of those over 64.

== Buildings ==
West Rushville is home to the Fairfield Union Local School District administrative office.

The historic Joseph Ijams House sits at the crossroads at the center of the village. Built circa 1810 it once served as a tavern on the old Zane's Trace road.
