= Winegardner Village =

Archaeological site in Ohio, United States

- U.S. National Register of Historic Places
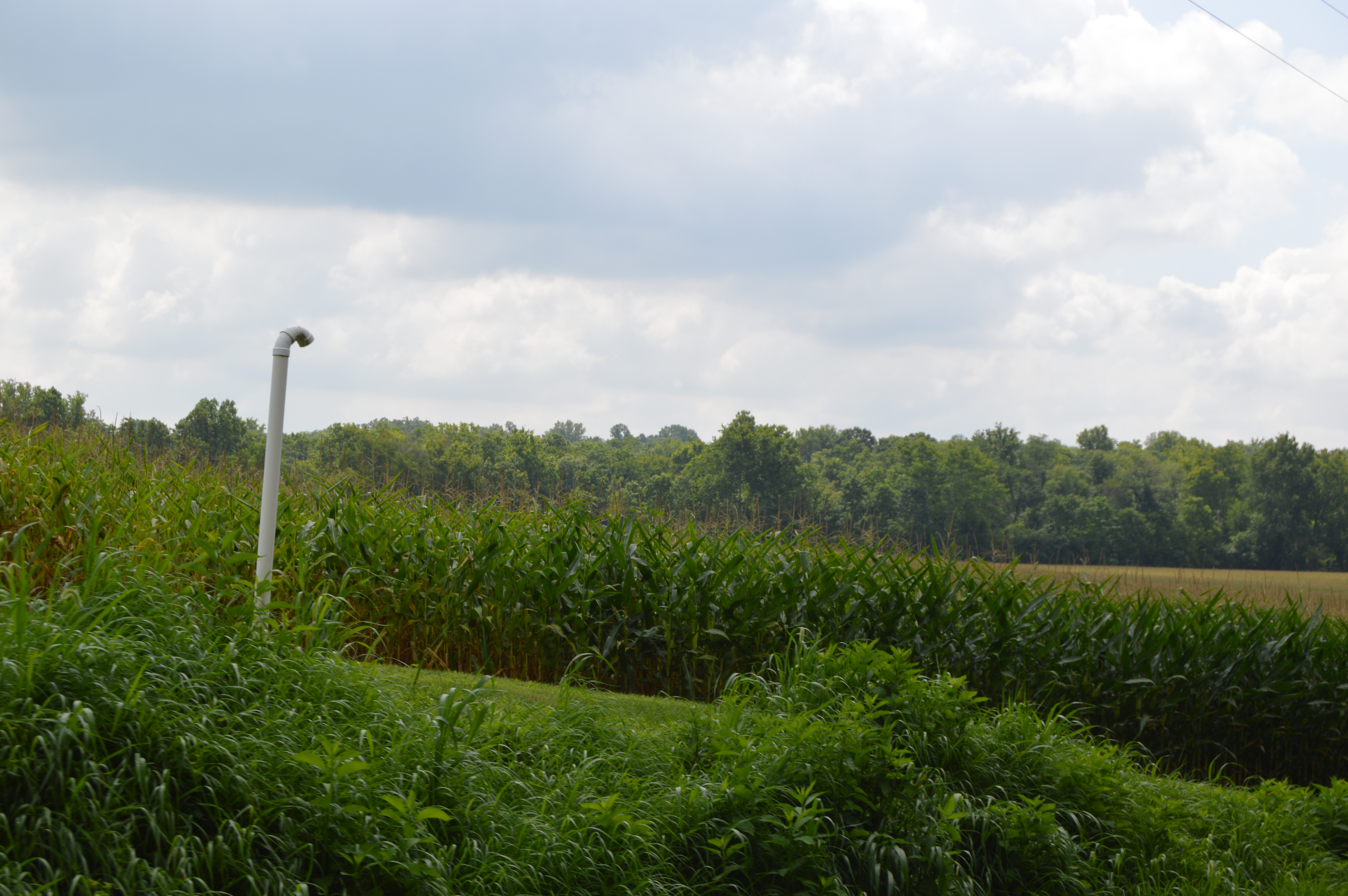
- Distant view of the site, located among the trees beyond the cornfield

- Location within Ohio Location within the United States
- Location: On a bluff above Little Rush Creek, east of the junction of Gun Barrel and Miller Siding Rds.
- Nearest city: Rushville, Ohio
- Coordinates: 39°47′55″N 82°26′21″W
- Area: 5 acres (2.0 ha)
- NRHP reference No.: 74001482
- Added to NRHP: July 30, 1974

The Winegardner Village (also known as the "Swinehart Village Site") is an archaeological site near Rushville in Fairfield County, Ohio, United States.

Located on a flat two-part bluff, the site was formerly used as pasture until the middle of the 20th century, when it came under cultivation. The resulting plowing brought up enough artifacts to warrant further investigation of the site, and in 1954, archaeologists conducted a test excavation. Among the artifacts discovered during this process were pottery, bones, and stone chips.

Archaeologists believe that the Winegardner Village was once occupied by a Middle or Late Woodland people. It is one of several Woodland period villages in the area, and its position atop a bluff overlooking Little Rush Creek gives it a defensive advantage that has often been cited in archaeological analysis of the site. Artifacts such as broken pottery and fire-burned stones have been seen as evidence that the site was occupied by a dense population.

In recognition of the site's archaeological significance, it was placed on the National Register of Historic Places in 1974. The landmarked area encompasses an area of approximately 5 acres (2.0 ha).
