= Fairfield County Infirmary =

National Register of Historic Places listing in Lancaster, Ohio

- U.S. National Register of Historic Places
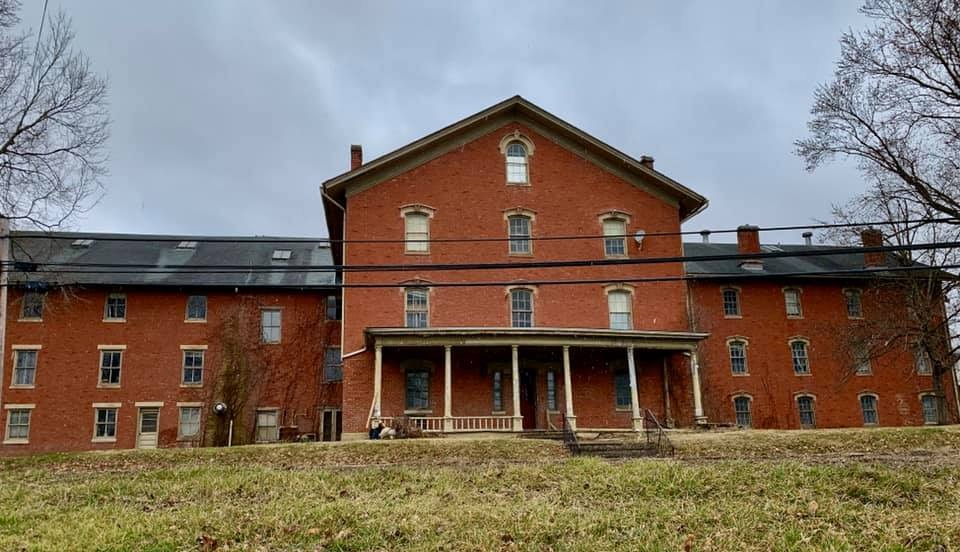
- Front of the building

- Location within Ohio Location within the United States
- Location: 1587 Granville Pike, Lancaster, Ohio
- Coordinates: 39.7394°N 82.5881°W
- Area: 5.939 acres (2.403 ha)
- Built: 1840
- Architectural style: Italianate
- NRHP reference No.: 100005128

The Fairfield County Infirmary, also known as the Fairfield County Poorhouse or Clarence E. Miller Building, is a historic site in Lancaster, Ohio. The current main building was constructed in 1840 and has been vacant since 2013. It is a common tourist attraction for paranormal investigators, allegedly being severely haunted due to its history.

A historic cemetery also exists on the property, with the last burial occurring in 1929.

== History ==
Fairfield County Infirmary was first opened in 1828. It was later reconstructed into the current building in 1840 and expanded in 1865. Numerous deaths occurred at the infirmary. The infirmary was abandoned in 1985 and was reused for county offices until 2013. It was temporarily repurposed by Habitat for Humanity in 2018.

== In popular culture ==
A documentary investigating the infirmary was released in 2020. Buses from American Horror Story: Freak Show are also present on the property.
