= Amanda Township, Fairfield County, Ohio =

Township in Ohio, US

- Township
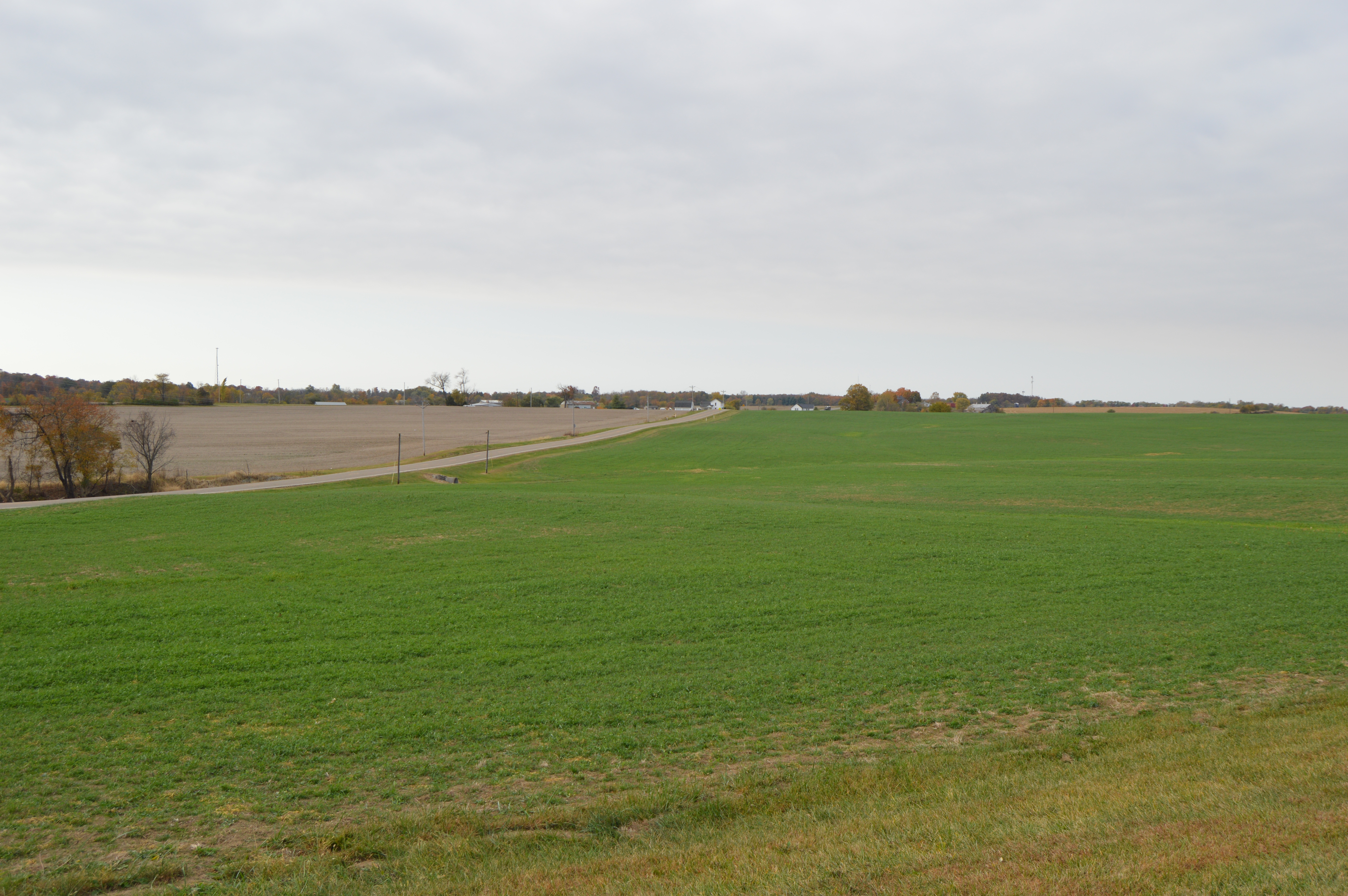
- Young wheat field on Dillon Road

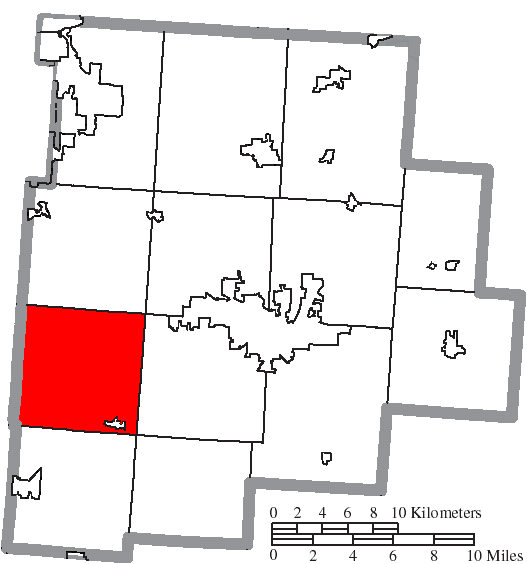
- Location of Amanda Township in Fairfield County
- Coordinates: 39°40′11″N 082°46′06″W
- Country: United States
- State: Ohio
- County: Fairfield

Area
  - Total: 36.9 sq mi (95.7 km^{2})
  - Land: 36.9 sq mi (95.5 km^{2})
  - Water: 0.077 sq mi (0.2 km^{2})
- Elevation: 938 ft (286 m)

Population (2020)
  - Total: 2,722
  - Density: 73.8/sq mi (28.5/km^{2})
- Time zone: UTC-5 (Eastern (EST))
  - Summer (DST): UTC-4 (EDT)
- ZIP code: 43102
- Area code: 740
- FIPS code: 39-01637
- GNIS feature ID: 1086072

Amanda Township is one of the thirteen townships of Fairfield County, Ohio, United States. As of the 2020 census, the population was 2,722.

== Geography ==
Located in the southwestern part of the county, it borders the following townships:

- Bloom Township - north
- Greenfield Township - northeast corner
- Hocking Township - east
- Madison Township - southeast corner
- Clearcreek Township - south
- Washington Township, Pickaway County - southwest
- Walnut Township, Pickaway County - west
- Madison Township, Pickaway County - northwest corner

The village of Amanda is located in southeastern Amanda Township, and the unincorporated community of Royalton lies in the northern part of the township.

== Name and history ==
Amanda Township took its name from Fort Amanda. Statewide, other Amanda Townships are located in Allen and Hancock counties.

== Government ==
The township is governed by a three-member board of trustees, who are elected in November of odd-numbered years to a four-year term beginning on the following January 1. Two are elected in the year after the presidential election and one is elected in the year before it. There is also an elected township fiscal officer, who serves a four-year term beginning on April 1 of the year after the election, which is held in November of the year before the presidential election. Vacancies in the fiscal officership or on the board of trustees are filled by the remaining trustees.
