= Joseph Ijams House =

Nineteenth-century house in Ohio

- U.S. National Register of Historic Places
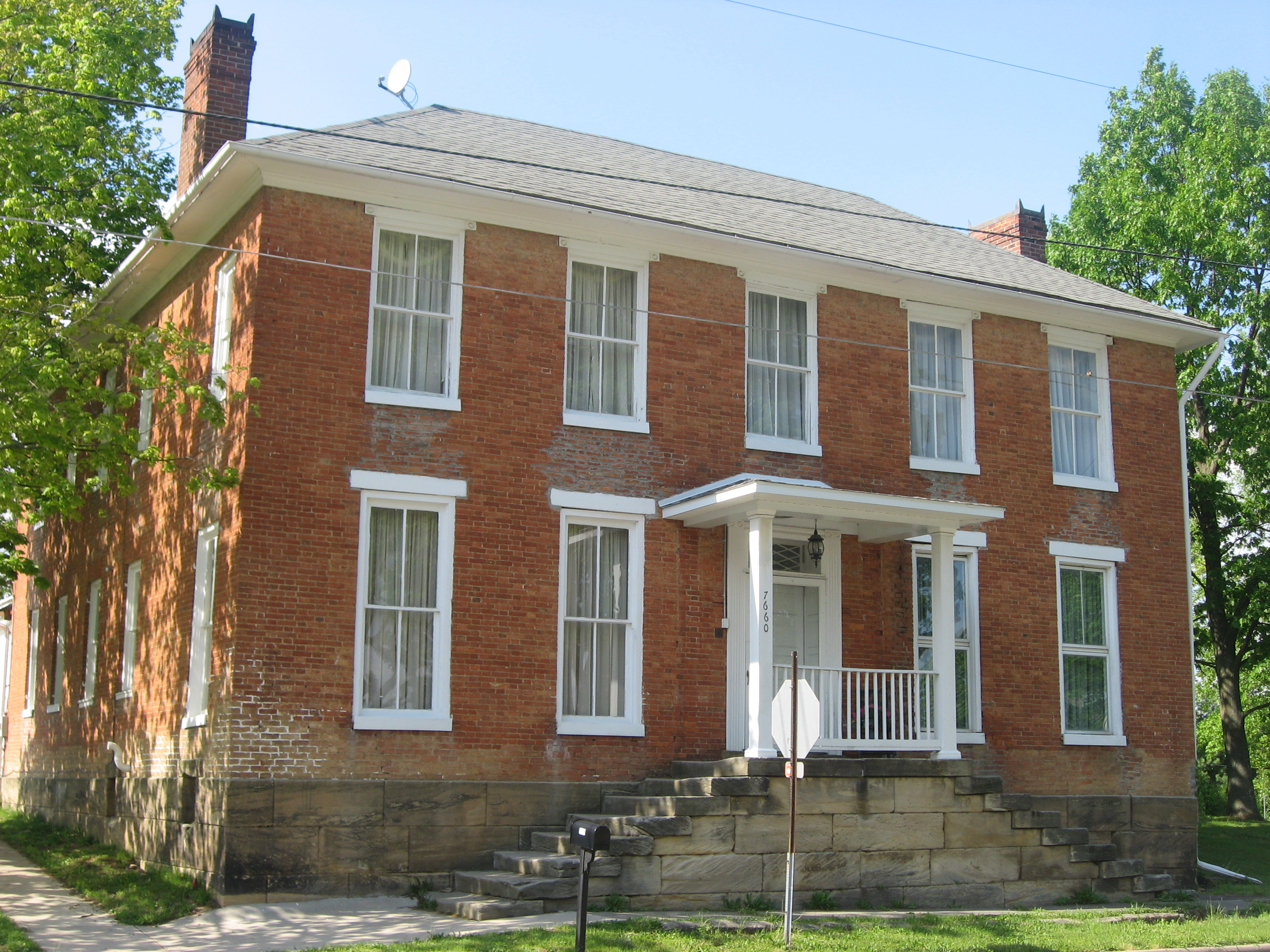
- The Joseph Ijams House in West Rushville, OH at Main and Broad Streets

- Location within Ohio
- Location: 7660 Main St West Rushville, Ohio
- Coordinates: 39.76375°N 82.4475°W
- Area: 0.50 acres (0.20 ha)
- Built: 1810
- Architectural style: Federal
- NRHP reference No.: 83001965
- Added to NRHP: June 16, 1983

The historic Joseph Ijams House is located in the village of West Rushville Richland Township, Fairfield County Ohio at the intersection of Main and Broad streets. Built circa 1810, the house stands along the original Zane's Trace road constructed by Colonel Ebenezer Zane in 1797. It is constructed of brick on a raised sandstone foundation and sits prominently at the crossroads at the center of the village and is considered a fine example of early 19th century Federal style architecture. Long known locally as "The Old Tavern", the Ijams House served as an inn and waystation on the road from Zanesville to Lancaster. It is believed to be one of the last remaining examples in Fairfield County of the many taverns that once stood along this heavily travelled route. In the mid-19th century it was owned by Judge William McClung, a prominent Fairfield County jurist. It was added to the National Register of Historic Places in 1983.
