= Berne Township, Ohio =

Township in Ohio, US

- Township
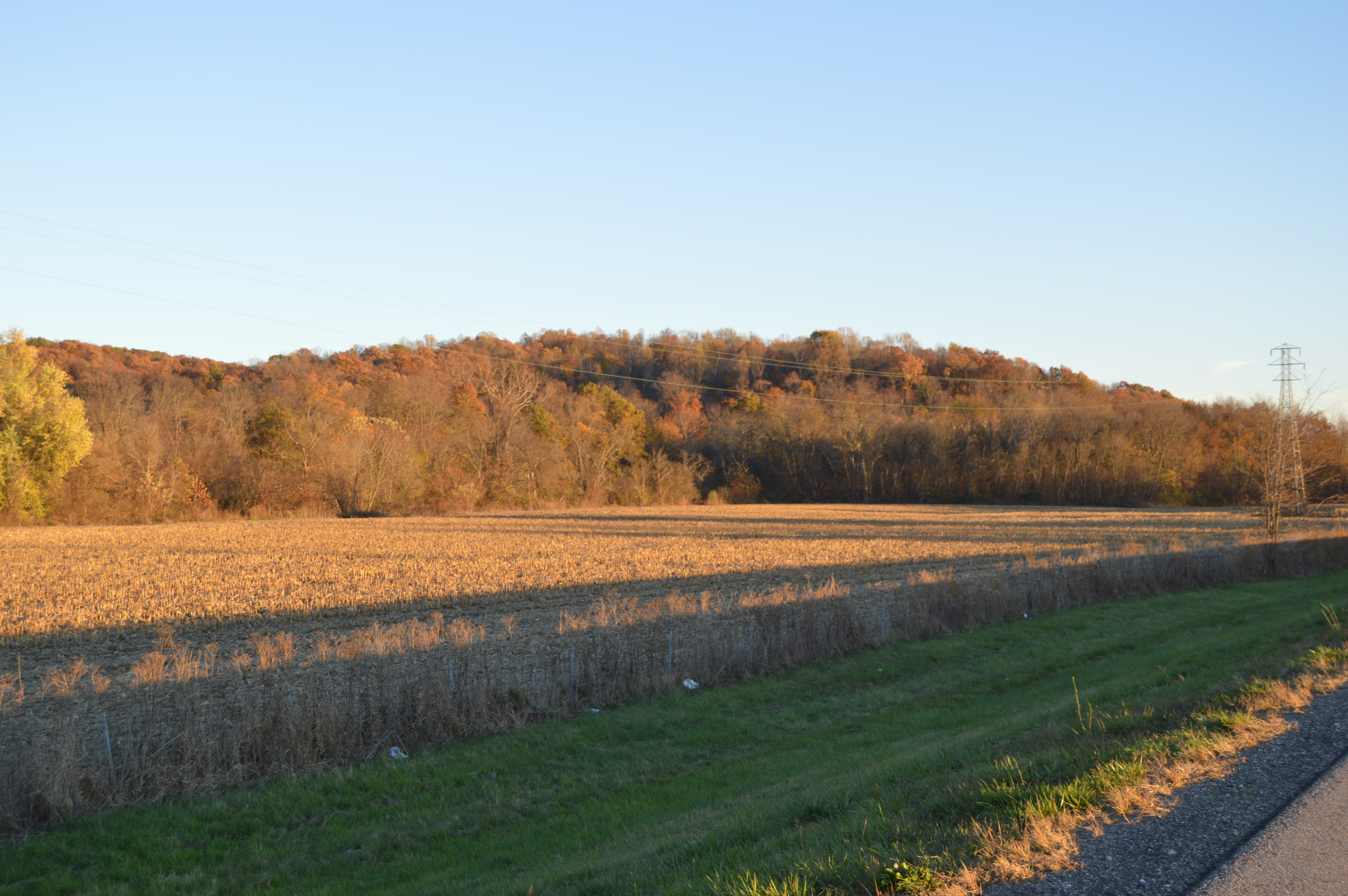
- Hocking River valley north of Sugar Grove

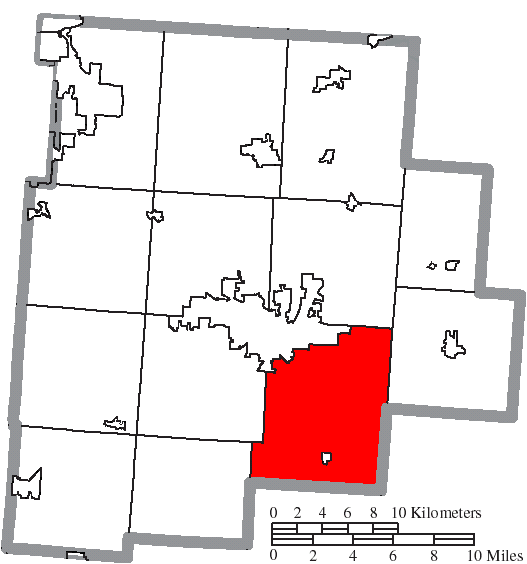
- Location of Berne Township in Fairfield County
- Coordinates: 39°38′58″N 82°33′10″W
- Country: United States
- State: Ohio
- County: Fairfield
- Named for: Bern, Switzerland

Area
  - Total: 44.4 sq mi (114.9 km^{2})
  - Land: 44.0 sq mi (114.0 km^{2})
  - Water: 0.35 sq mi (0.9 km^{2})
- Elevation: 781 ft (238 m)

Population (2020)
  - Total: 5,057
  - Density: 114.9/sq mi (44.36/km^{2})
- Time zone: UTC-5 (Eastern (EST))
  - Summer (DST): UTC-4 (EDT)
- FIPS code: 39-05956
- GNIS feature ID: 1086073
- Website: bernetownship.org

Berne Township is one of the thirteen townships of Fairfield County, Ohio, United States. As of the 2020 census the population was 5,057.

== Geography and recreation ==
Located in southeastern Fairfield County, Berne Township borders the city of Lancaster and includes the village of Sugar Grove. A portion of the Flight of the Hawk Park lies in the southern section of the township. Operated by the Fairfield County Park District, the 6-acre park features walking trails, native plant habitats, and a massive steel sculpture of a red-tailed hawk designed by local artist Ric Leichliter. The sculpture stands over 40 feet tall and serves as a visible landmark along U.S. Route 33. The township’s terrain includes wooded hills, ridges, and creeks, characteristic of the unglaciated Allegheny Plateau, and has long supported both agriculture and outdoor recreation. Located in the southern part of the county, it borders the following townships:

- Pleasant Township - north
- Rush Creek Township - northeast
- Marion Township, Hocking County - southeast
- Good Hope Township, Hocking County - south
- Madison Township - southwest
- Hocking Township - west
- Greenfield Township - northwest corner

Two municipalities are located in Berne Township: part of the city of Lancaster, the county seat of Fairfield County, in the northwest; and the village of Sugar Grove in the south.

== Name and history ==
Berne Township was organized in 1805 and takes its name from the city of Bern in Switzerland, reflecting the heritage of early Swiss settlers in the region. Like many communities in southeastern Ohio, the township saw waves of European immigration in the 19th century, particularly German-speaking Swiss farmers who were drawn to the fertile land and rolling terrain. The township remained largely agricultural through the 20th century, with family farms forming the backbone of the local economy.

== Historic sites ==
Among the township’s most historically significant structures is the John Artz Farmhouse, built in 1857. This two-story brick home exhibits a mix of Greek Revival and Italianate architectural styles and is listed on the National Register of Historic Places. The farmhouse belonged to one of the area's more prosperous mid-19th-century families and remains a striking example of period architecture in rural Fairfield County.

== Cemeteries and heritage sites ==
Berne Township contains numerous 19th-century cemeteries, including Pleasant Hill Cemetery near Sugar Grove, known for its quaint stone chapel and hillside setting. These cemeteries offer insights into early settlement patterns, family histories, and community structures. Historic maps of the township from the early 1900s depict a dense pattern of family farms, schoolhouses, and churches that were central to township life.

== Government ==
The township is governed by a three-member board of trustees, who are elected in November of odd-numbered years to a four-year term beginning on the following January 1. Two are elected in the year after the presidential election and one is elected in the year before it. There is also an elected township fiscal officer, who serves a four-year term beginning on April 1 of the year after the election, which is held in November of the year before the presidential election. Vacancies in the fiscal officership or on the board of trustees are filled by the remaining trustees.
