= Ety Habitation Site =

Archaeological site in Ohio, United States

- U.S. National Register of Historic Places
- Location: Northeast of Carroll
- Nearest city: Carroll, Ohio
- Area: 4 acres (1.6 ha)
- NRHP reference No.: 74001477
- Added to NRHP: July 12, 1974

The Ety Habitation Site is an archaeological site in the central part of the U.S. state of Ohio. Located northeast of the village of Carroll in Fairfield County, it encompasses an area of about 4 acres (1.6 ha), which is covered by a group of hillocks. Here have been found large numbers of artifacts of prehistoric man; the nature of the material found suggests that the Habitation Site was a substantial settlement for a long period, most likely from the Hopewellian period, two thousand years ago. Few Hopewellian sites have been discovered that both yielded such valuable information and were so little damaged by the passage of time; as a result, the Ety Habitation Site is a leading archaeological site.

Contributing to the rarity of the Ety Habitation Site is its proximity to one of the culture's monumental geometric earthworks. Few village sites have been found near Hopewell earthworks; as late as 1939, no Hopewell village sites had ever been excavated. Known as the Ety Enclosure, these earthworks are also an unusually well-preserved archaeological site.

Because of its archaeological value, the Ety Habitation Site was listed on the National Register of Historic Places in 1974. Two other archaeological sites near Carroll are also on the Register: the Ety Enclosure, and the Coon Hunters Mound, which was built by the earlier Adena culture.
