= Tarlton, Ohio =

- Village
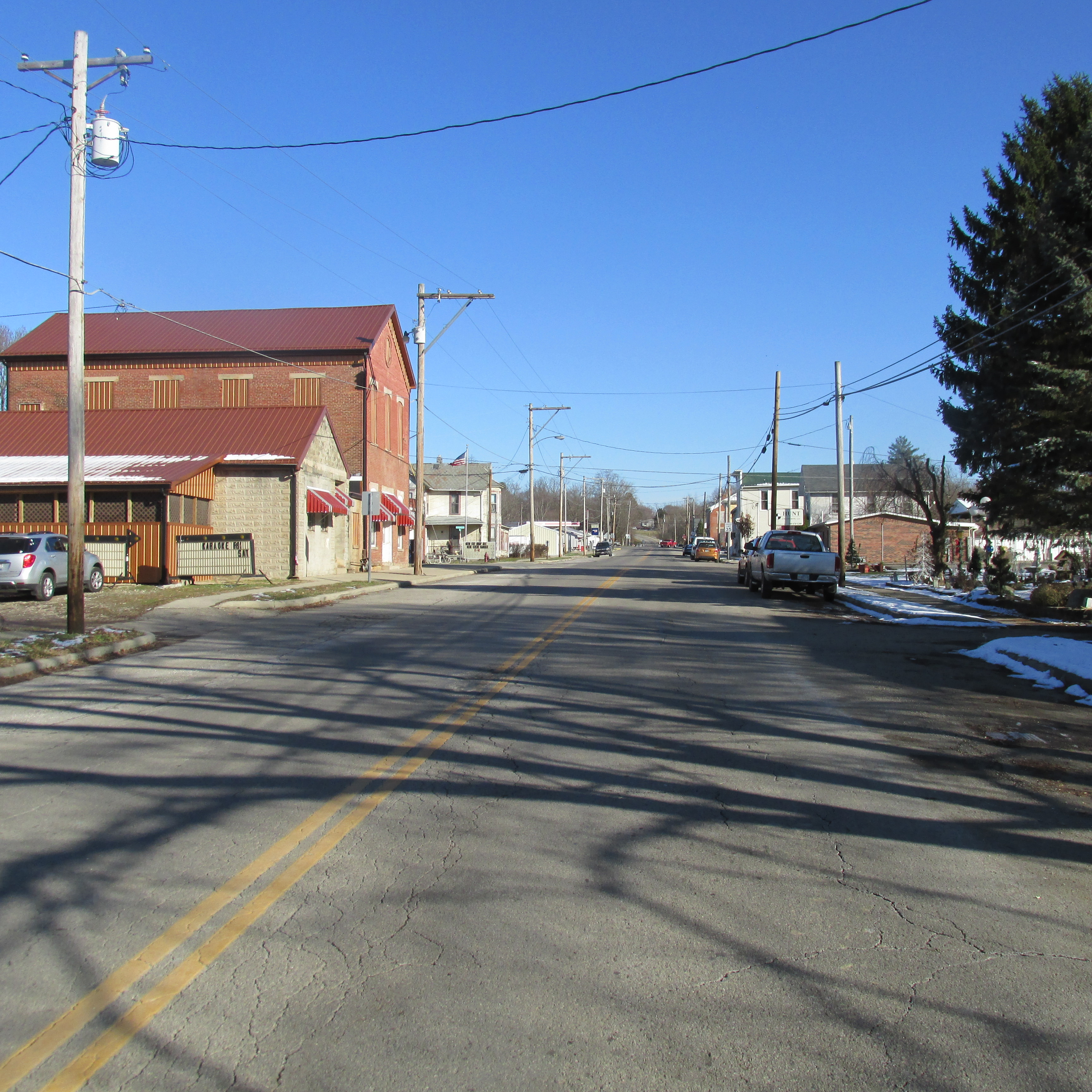
- Looking east on Main Street in Tarlton

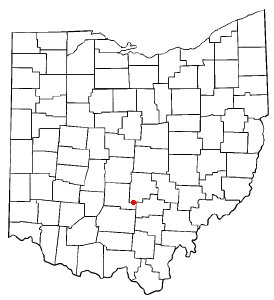
- Location of Tarlton, Ohio

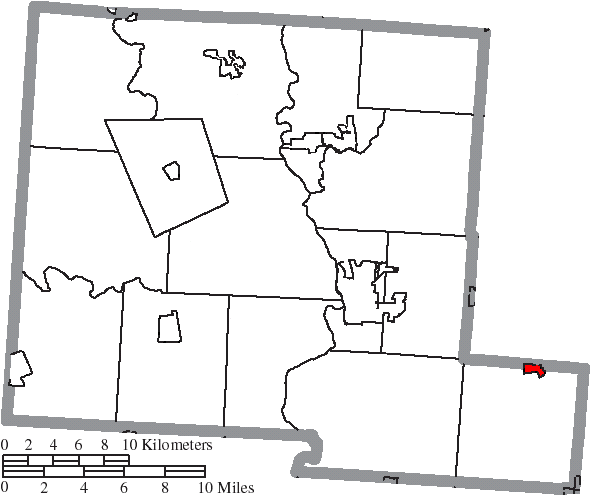
- Location of Tarlton in Pickaway County
- Coordinates: 39°33′15″N 82°46′41″W
- Country: United States
- State: Ohio
- Counties: Fairfield, Pickaway

Area
  - Total: 0.38 sq mi (0.99 km^{2})
  - Land: 0.38 sq mi (0.99 km^{2})
  - Water: 0 sq mi (0.00 km^{2})
- Elevation: 883 ft (269 m)

Population (2020)
  - Total: 254
  - Density: 661.7/sq mi (255.47/km^{2})
- Time zone: UTC-5 (Eastern (EST))
  - Summer (DST): UTC-4 (EDT)
- ZIP code: 43156
- Area code: 740
- FIPS code: 39-76148
- GNIS feature ID: 2399954
- Website: villageoftarlton.com

Tarlton is a village in Fairfield and Pickaway counties in the U.S. state of Ohio. The population was 254 at the 2020 census.

== History ==
Tarlton was originally called Newellstown, and under the latter name was laid out in 1801.

The Cross Mound is nearby, which was built by the pre-Columbian Mound Builders.

== Geography ==
According to the United States Census Bureau, the village has a total area of 0.42 square miles (1.09 km^{2}), all land.

Tarlton is 30 miles southeast of Columbus.

== Demographics ==
Historical population
Census	Pop.	Note	%±
1870	407		—
1880	425		4.4%
1890	448		5.4%
1900	388		−13.4%
1910	302		−22.2%
1920	270		−10.6%
1930	278		3.0%
1940	274		−1.4%
1950	371		35.4%
1960	377		1.6%
1970	412		9.3%
1980	394		−4.4%
1990	315		−20.1%
2000	298		−5.4%
2010	282		−5.4%
2020	254		−9.9%
U.S. Decennial Census

=== 2010 census ===
As of the census of 2010, there were 282 people, 100 households, and 77 families living in the village. The population density was 671.4 inhabitants per square mile (259.2/km^{2}). There were 115 housing units at an average density of 273.8 per square mile (105.7/km^{2}). The racial makeup of the village was 98.9% White, 0.7% African American, and 0.4% from two or more races. Hispanic or Latino people of any race were 2.8% of the population.

There were 100 households, of which 41.0% had children under the age of 18 living with them, 58.0% were married couples living together, 14.0% had a female householder with no husband present, 5.0% had a male householder with no wife present, and 23.0% were non-families. 18.0% of all households were made up of individuals, and 10% had someone living alone who was 65 years of age or older. The average household size was 2.82 and the average family size was 3.23.

The median age in the village was 39.2 years. 27% of residents were under the age of 18; 8.4% were between the ages of 18 and 24; 22.3% were from 25 to 44; 31.9% were from 45 to 64; and 10.3% were 65 years of age or older. The gender makeup of the village was 47.5% male and 52.5% female.

=== 2000 census ===
As of the census of 2000, there were 298 people, 102 households, and 75 families living in the village. The population density was 710.2 inhabitants per square mile (274.2/km^{2}). There were 120 housing units at an average density of 286.0 per square mile (110.4/km^{2}). The racial makeup of the village was 100.00% White.

There were 102 households, out of which 38.2% had children under the age of 18 living with them, 56.9% were married couples living together, 8.8% had a female householder with no husband present, and 25.5% were non-families. 23.5% of all households were made up of individuals, and 13.7% had someone living alone who was 65 years of age or older. The average household size was 2.92 and the average family size was 3.39.

In the village, the population was spread out, with 31.2% under the age of 18, 7.4% from 18 to 24, 30.5% from 25 to 44, 19.8% from 45 to 64, and 11.1% who were 65 years of age or older. The median age was 36 years. For every 100 females there were 101.4 males. For every 100 females age 18 and over, there were 107.1 males.

The median income for a household in the village was $31,875, and the median income for a family was $43,125. Males had a median income of $30,938 versus $25,625 for females. The per capita income for the village was $13,379. About 9.0% of families and 6.0% of the population were below the poverty line, including 1.1% of those under the age of eighteen and 22.5% of those 65 or over.

== Notable person ==
- William Sooy Smith, Union general in the American Civil War and prominent postbellum bridge builder

== Gallery ==
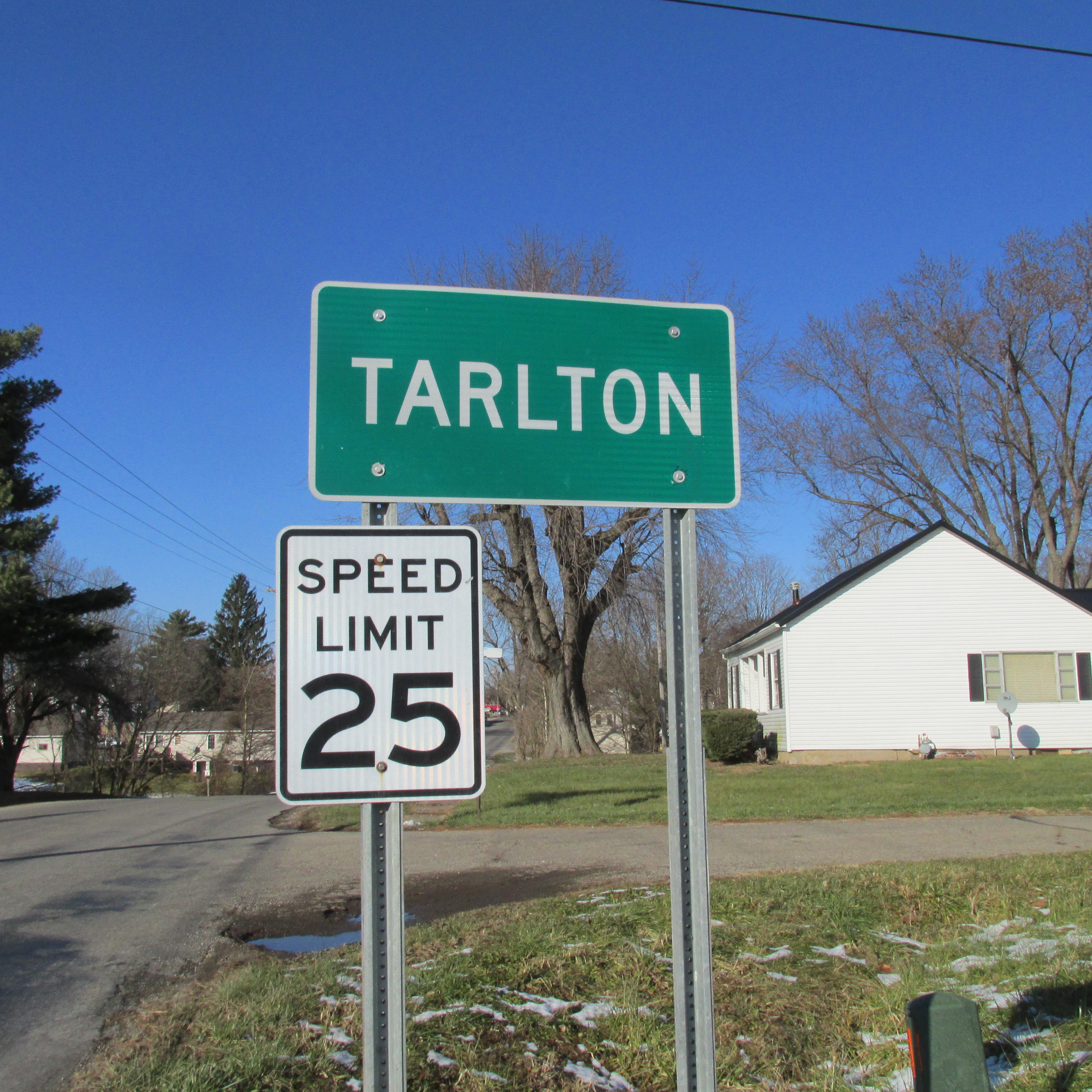
Tarlton community sign

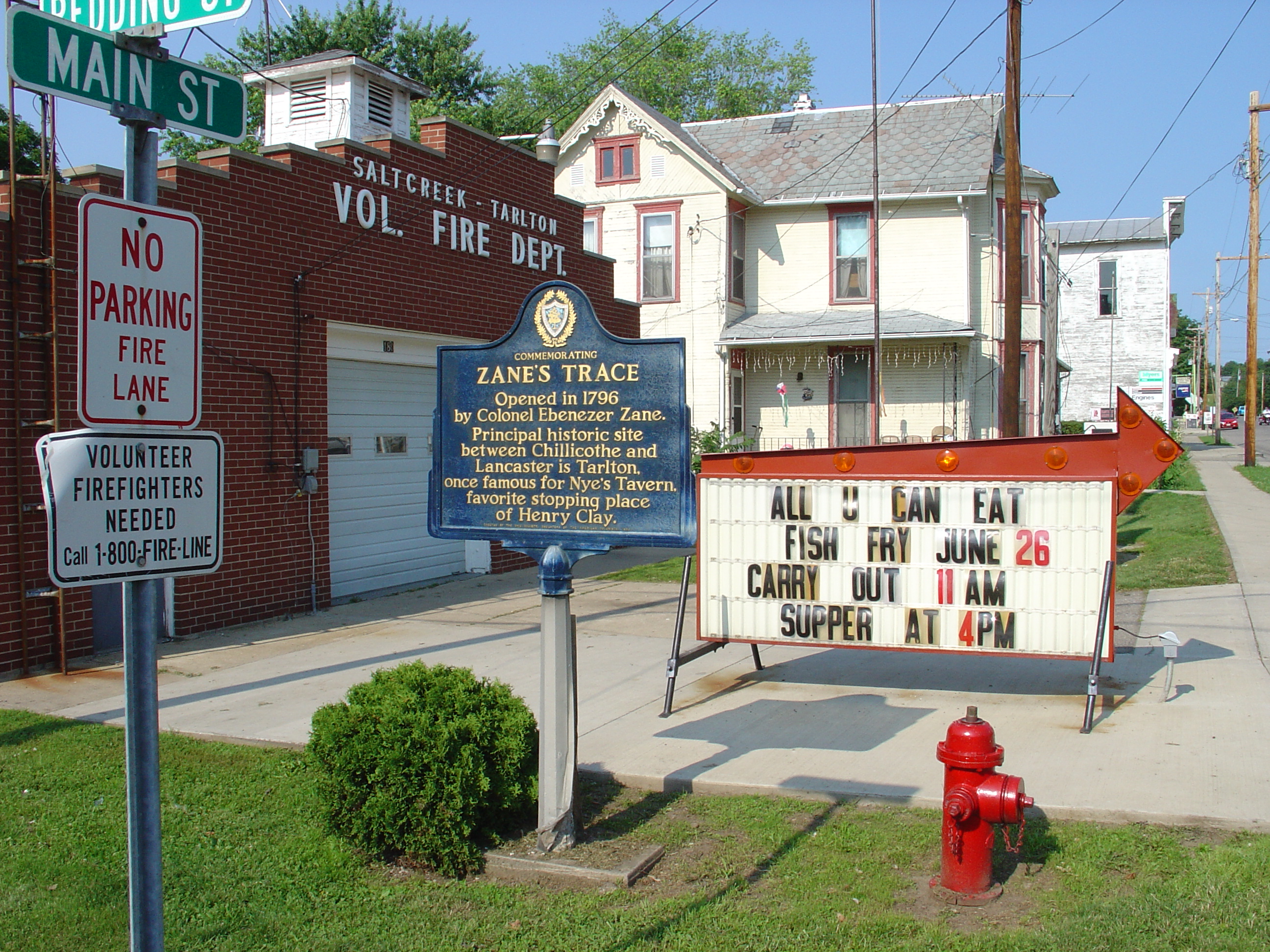
Zane's Trace Historical Marker in Tarlton
