= Cross Mound =

Archaeological site in Ohio, United States

- Tarlton Cross Mound
- U.S. National Register of Historic Places
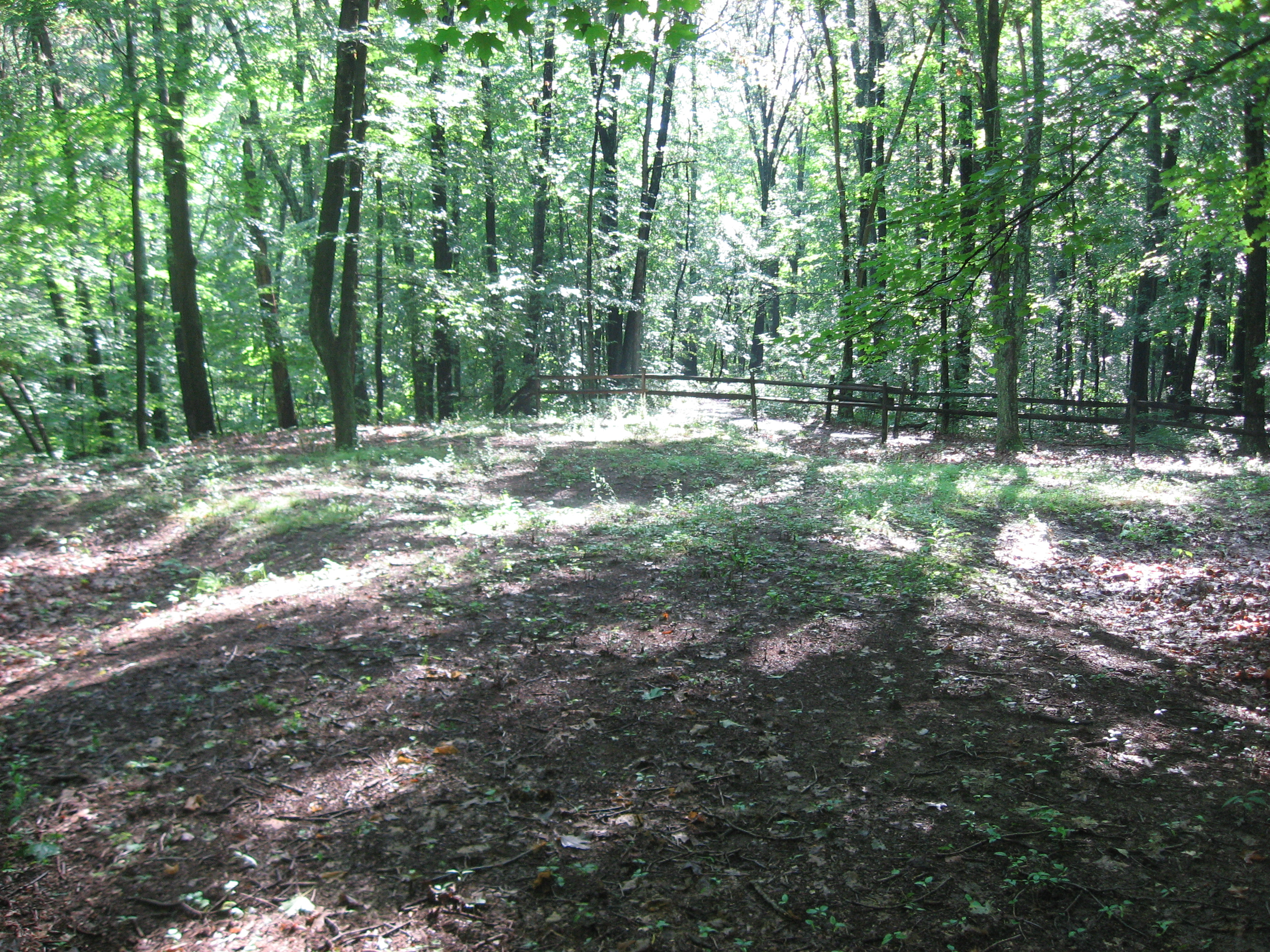
- Tarlton Cross Mound from the west

- Location within Ohio Location within the United States
- Location: Cross Mound Park, northwest of Tarlton
- Nearest city: Tarlton, Ohio
- Coordinates: 39°33′44″N 82°47′7″W
- Area: Less than 1 acre (0.40 ha)
- NRHP reference No.: 70000489
- Added to NRHP: November 10, 1970

Cross Mound (also called the Tarlton Cross Mound) is an earthwork located near Tarlton, Ohio in the United States. The culture who built it and the time it was built remains unknown. It is listed on the National Register of Historic Places. A 21st-century archaeologists described it as "one of the many enigmatic effigy mounds in Southern Ohio."

== Location ==
The site is located in Cross Mound Park, near a tributary of the Scioto River. The site totals 29-acres. To access the site, visitors must pass over a suspension bridge that was built in 1936.

== Survey history ==
=== Squier and Davis: 1848 ===
Ephraim George Squier and Edwin Hamilton Davis visited the site in the mid 1840s. They would discuss their survey in their 1848 publication Ancient Monuments of the Mississippi Valley. They describe the location of the work as occupying a "narrow spur of land,". They describe the design of the work as a Greek cross. The work was three feet high and 90 feet apart on each end and closely matches the cardinal directions. A small ditch surrounded it, following the design of the cross. In the middle of the cross was a circle shaped depression. The depression was noted as being 20 feet in diameter and 20 feet deep. Towards what they describe as the "back" of the cross was "a small circular elevation of stone and earth." (Later to be described by contemporary surveyors as a "small stone mound".) They believed it to be an altar. Squier and Davis believed that this installation represented a connection with the Alligator Effigy Mound in nearby Granville, Ohio. Near the main site, they noted a collection of smaller mounds. A larger hill near the cross was described as having "several large mounds".

=== Today ===
Today, the site is maintained and owned by Fairfield County Parks. The Ohio Historical Society reports that the 20-foot depression in the middle of the cross is 12 inches deep, not 20 inches deep in the middle of it. Dr. Greg Little also suggests that the cross itself is four feet high, not three feet high as surveyed by Squier and Davis. Three small mounds also exist at the site, today.

The exact age of the site is undetermined. They theorize that the site may represent the sun, as crosses were utilized by the Mississippian culture frequently as a sun symbol. They also theorize that it was built by the Fort Ancient peoples, but the National Park Service and others suggest that it was built by the Hopewell culture.

Despite the suggestion of that the Hopewells designed the work, Dr. Jarrod Burks of Ohio Valley Archaeology states, "not enough evidence exists to support this claim." Burks does believe that the site was probably built during the Middle Woodland period. Other effigy mounds in the area, Alligator Effigy Mound and Serpent Mound, are both dated after 1,000 AD. This dates them as being built by the Fort Ancient peoples, and Burks believes the same might be true for Cross Mound.

== Gallery ==
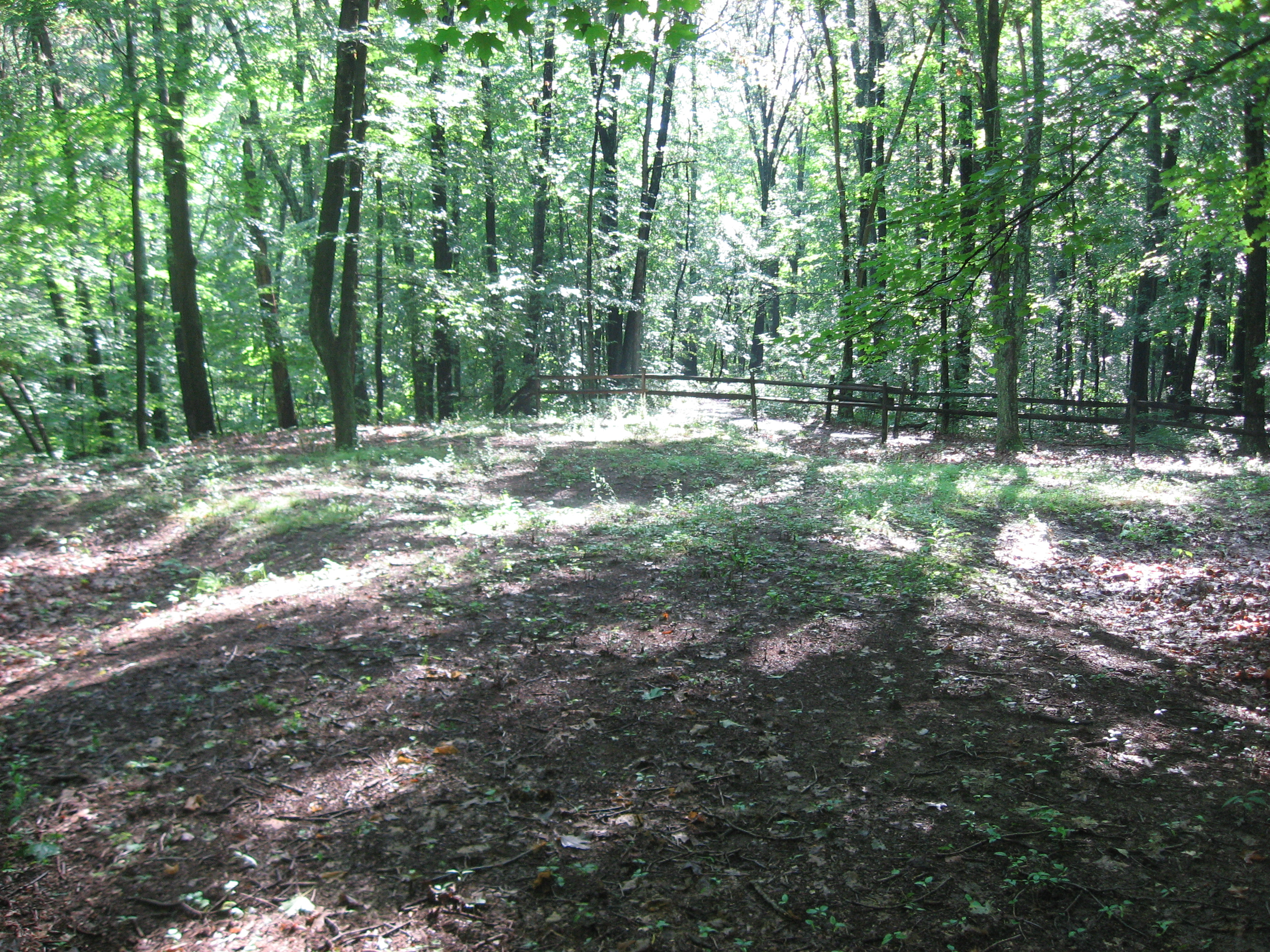
Site view from the west

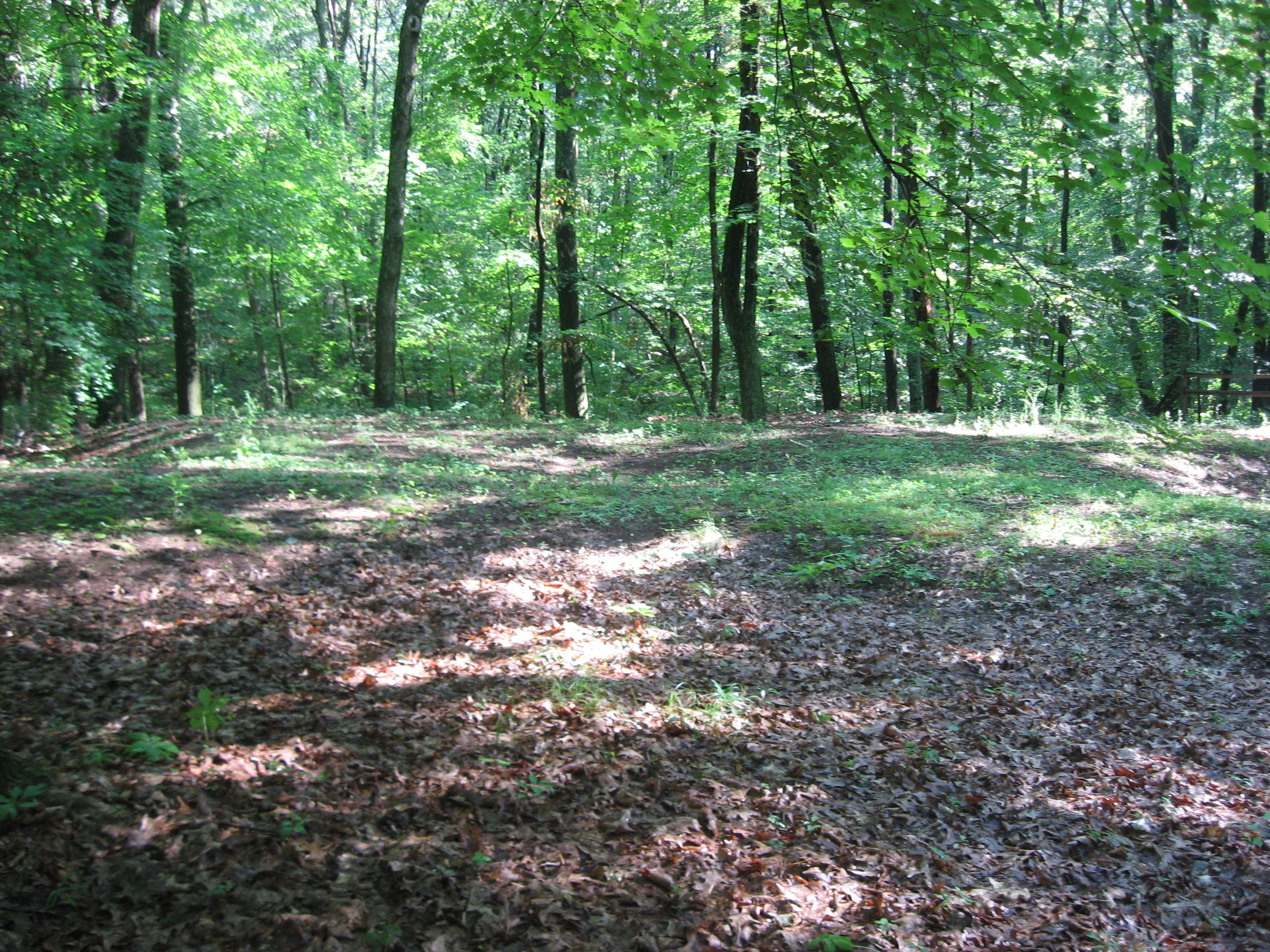
Site view from the southwest

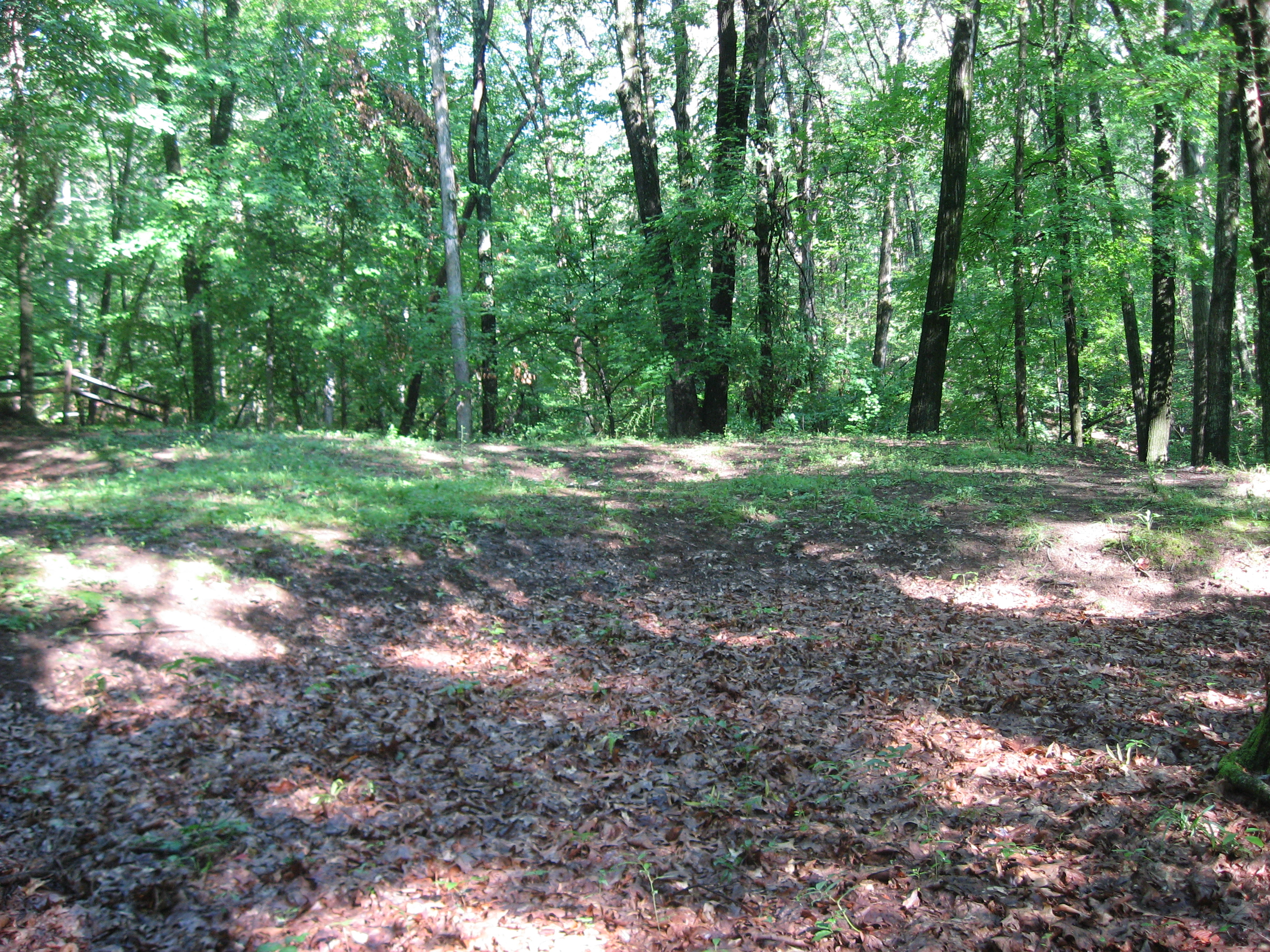
Site view from the southeast

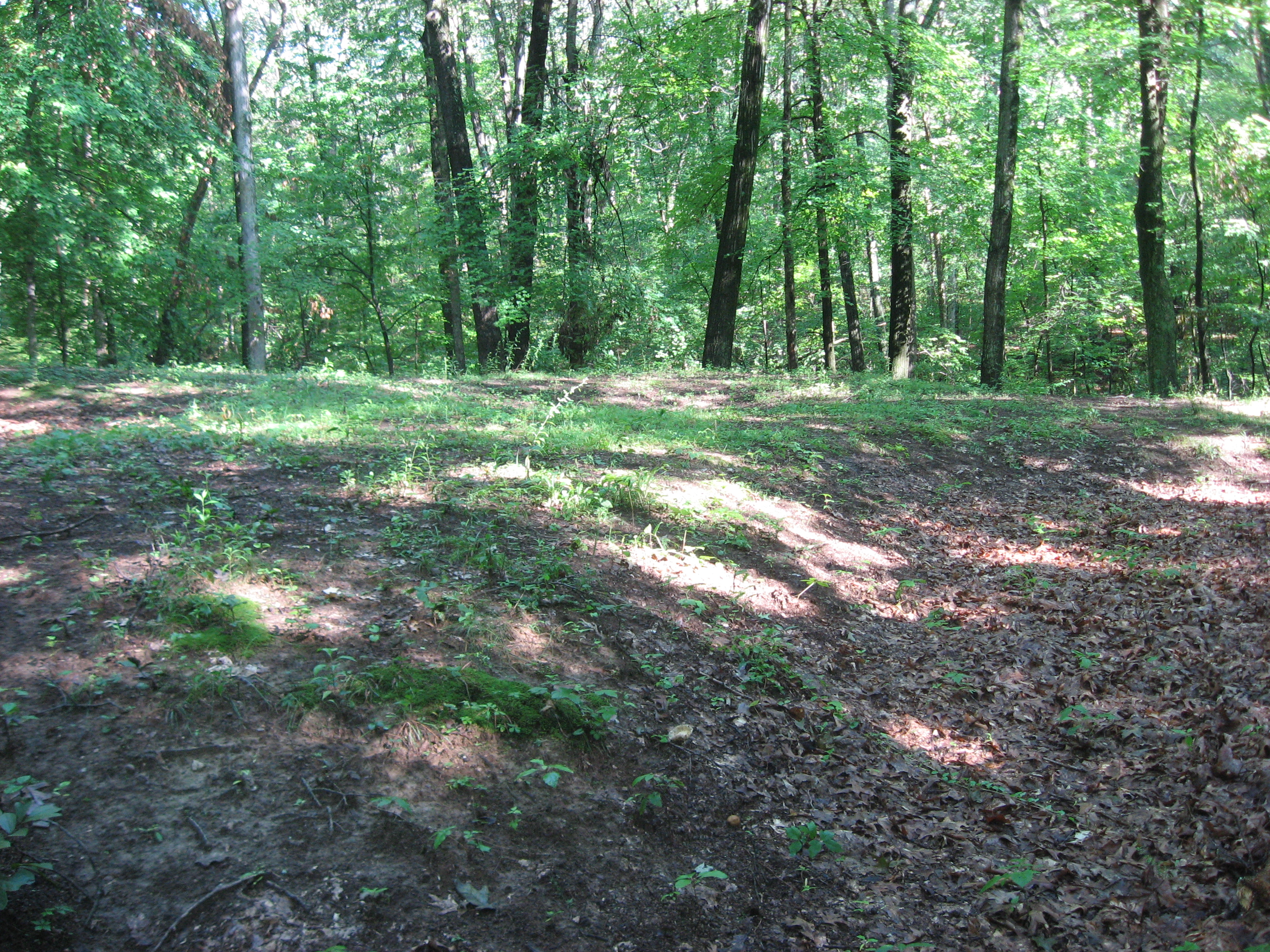
Site view from the south

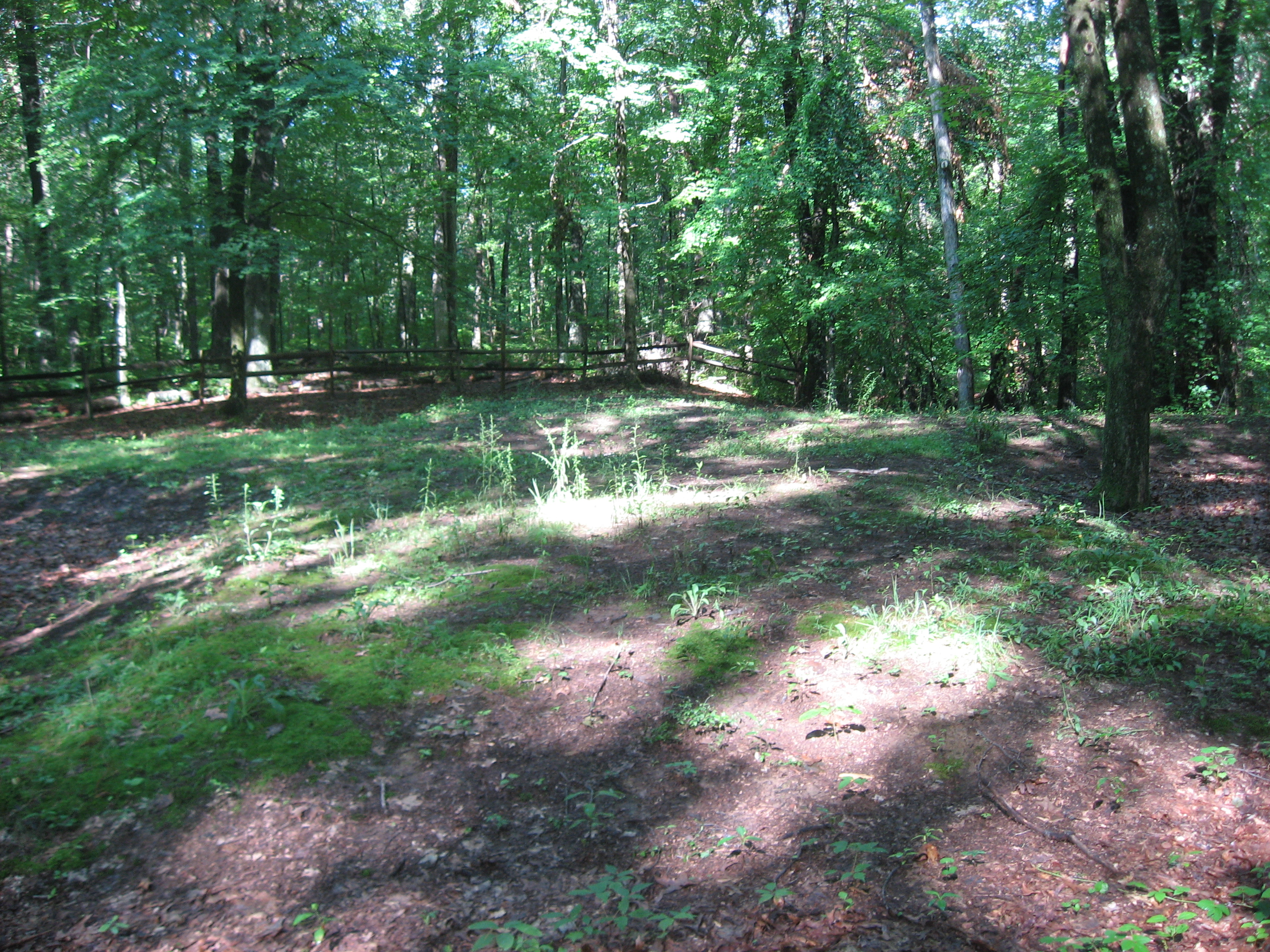
Site view from the east
