= Madison Township, Franklin County, Ohio =

Township in Ohio, US

- Township
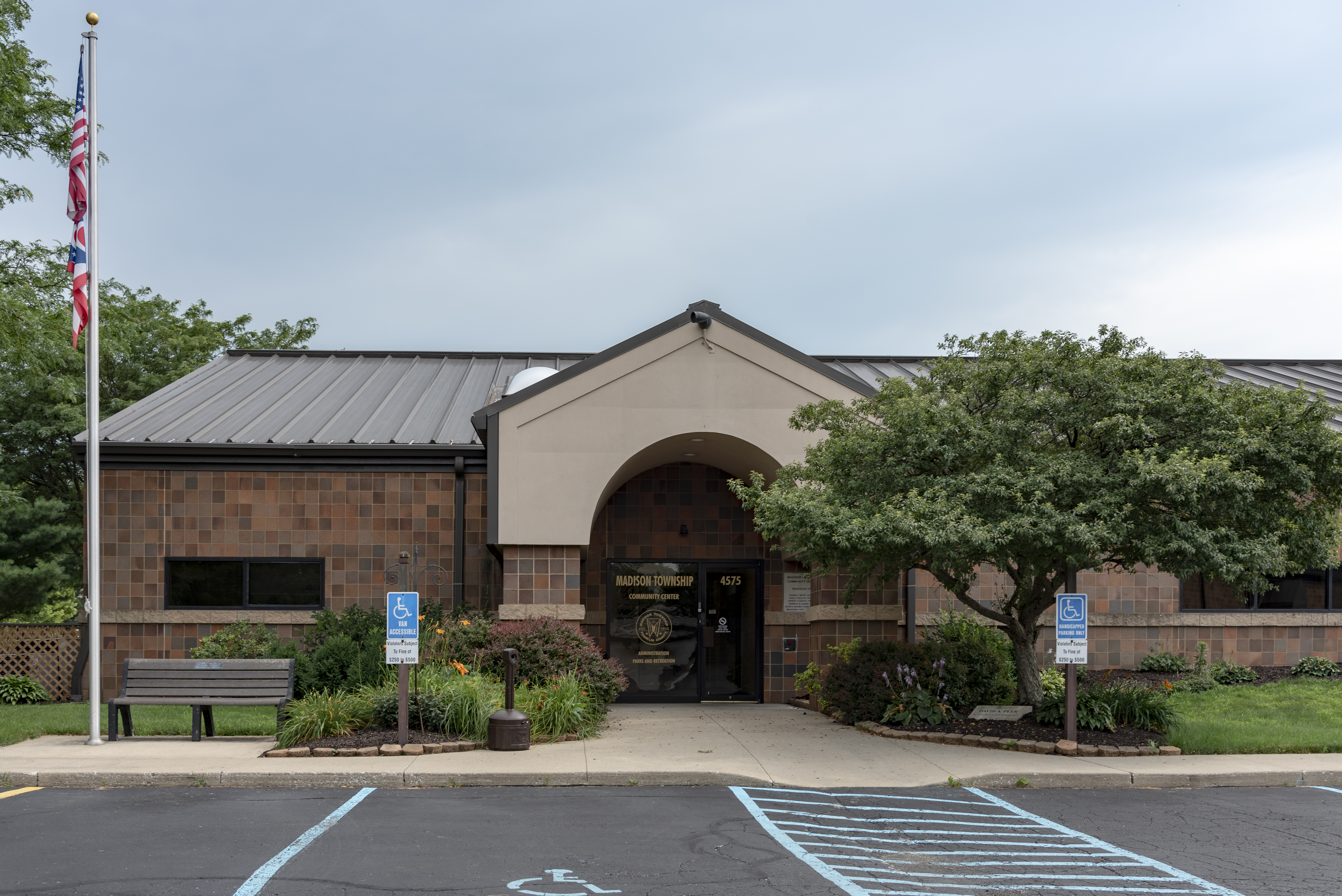
- Madison Township Administrative Offices

- Location of Madison Township in Franklin County.
- Coordinates: 39°52′4″N 82°52′5″W
- Country: United States
- State: Ohio
- County: Franklin

Area
  - Total: 40.6 sq mi (105 km^{2})
  - Land: 39.9 sq mi (103 km^{2})
  - Water: 0.8 sq mi (2.1 km^{2})
- Elevation: 748 ft (228 m)

Population (2020)
  - Total: 25,945
  - Density: 650/sq mi (251/km^{2})
- Time zone: UTC-5 (Eastern (EST))
  - Summer (DST): UTC-4 (EDT)
- FIPS code: 39-46410
- GNIS feature ID: 1086107

Madison Township is one of the seventeen townships of Franklin County, Ohio, United States. The 2020 census found 25,945 people in the township.

== Geography ==
Located in the southeastern corner of the county, it borders the following townships and municipalities:

- Columbus - north
- Brice - northeast
- Lithopolis - southeast
- Truro Township - northeast
- Violet Township, Fairfield County - east
- Bloom Township, Fairfield County - southeast
- Madison Township, Pickaway County - south
- Harrison Township, Pickaway County - southwest corner
- Hamilton Township - west
- Obetz - northwest

Several municipalities are located in Madison Township:

- The city of Canal Winchester, in the east
- The city of Columbus, in the north and southwest
- The city of Groveport, in the west
- The village of Obetz, in the northwest
- The city of Pickerington, in the northeast

The census-designated place of Blacklick Estates lies in northern Madison Township.

The following streams run through Madison Township:

- Alum Creek
- Big Walnut Creek
- Blacklick Creek

== Name and history ==
It is one of twenty Madison Townships statewide.

The township was organized in 1810, when its population had reached 500.

== Government ==
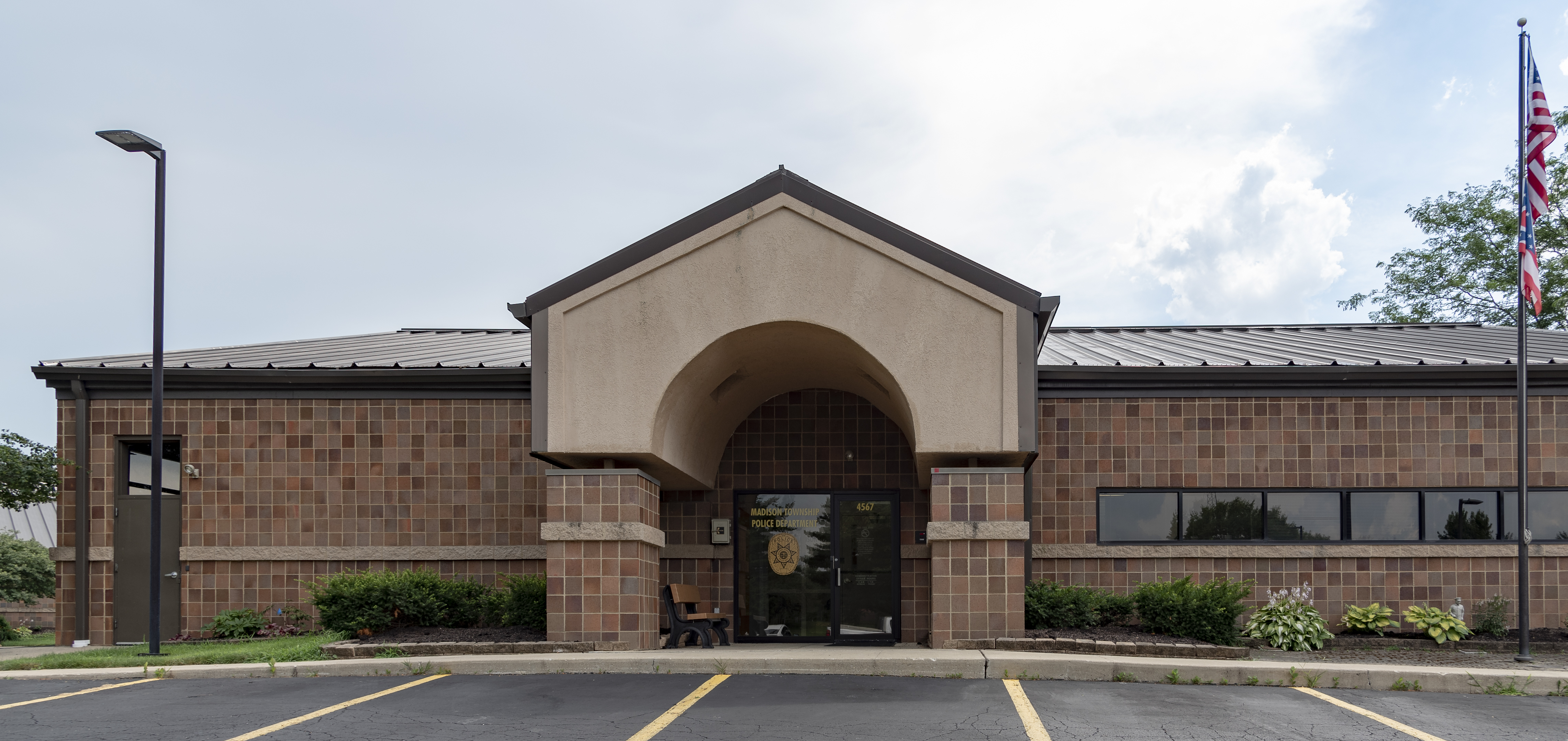
Madison Township Police Department Headquarters

The township is governed by a three-member board of trustees, who are elected in November of odd-numbered years to a four-year term beginning on the following January 1. Two are elected in the year after the presidential election and one is elected in the year before it. There is also an elected township fiscal officer, who serves a four-year term beginning on April 1 of the year after the election, which is held in November of the year before the presidential election. Vacancies in the fiscal officership or on the board of trustees are filled by the remaining trustees.
