= Madison Township, Pickaway County, Ohio =

Township in Ohio, US

- Township
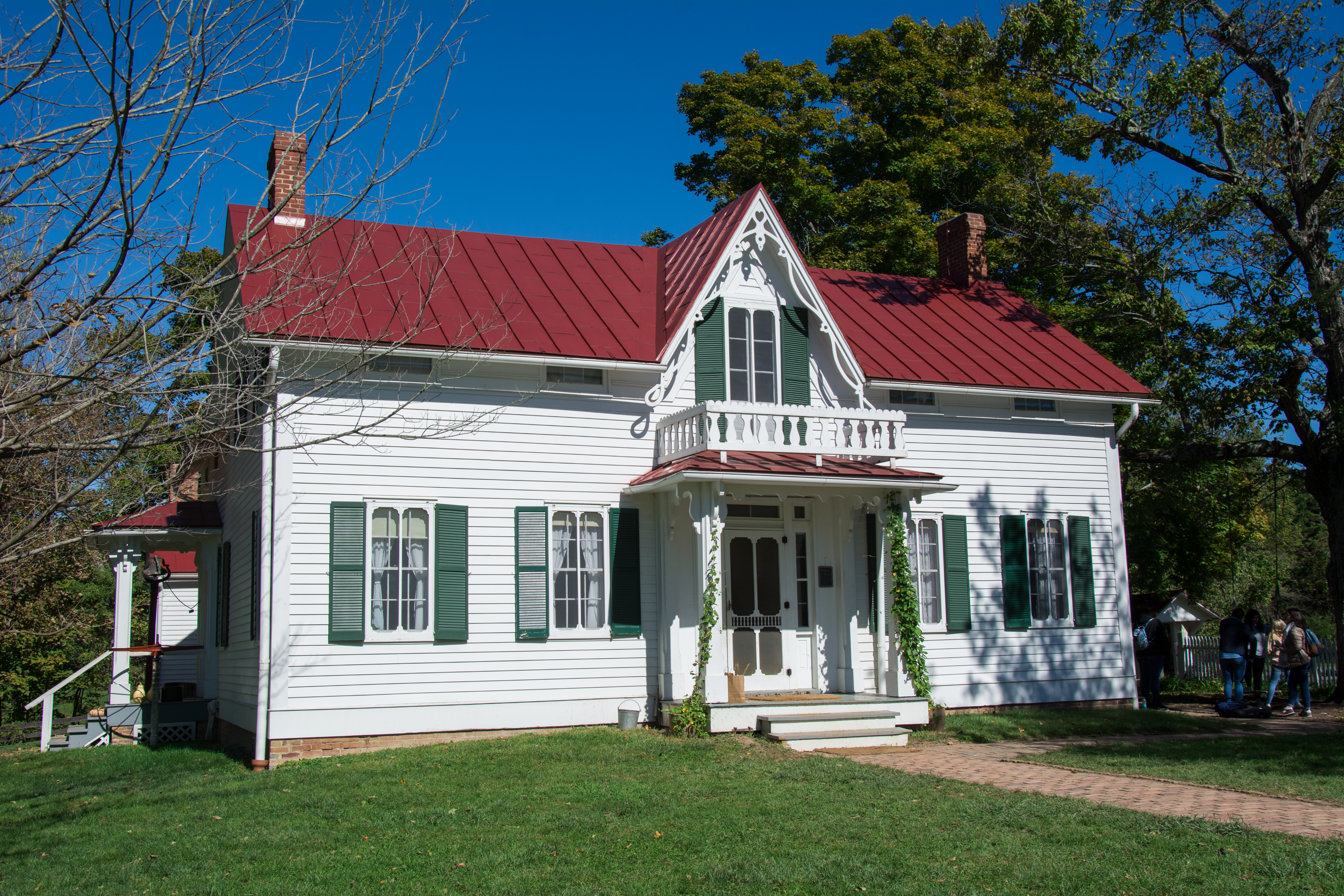
- The Fridley-Oman Farmhouse, part of Slate Run Metro Park

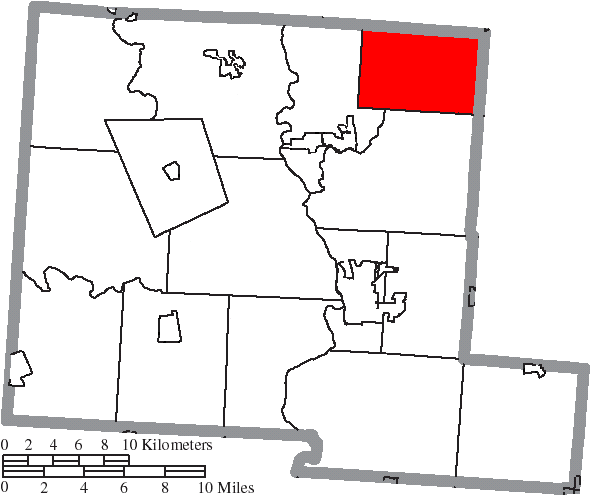
- Location of Madison Township in Pickaway County
- Coordinates: 39°46′34″N 82°53′45″W
- Country: United States
- State: Ohio
- County: Pickaway

Area
  - Total: 24.5 sq mi (63.5 km^{2})
  - Land: 24.4 sq mi (63.3 km^{2})
  - Water: 0.077 sq mi (0.2 km^{2})
- Elevation: 751 ft (229 m)

Population (2020)
  - Total: 1,712
  - Density: 70/sq mi (27/km^{2})
- Time zone: UTC-5 (Eastern (EST))
  - Summer (DST): UTC-4 (EDT)
- FIPS code: 39-46564
- GNIS feature ID: 1086797
- Website: https://www.madisonpickaway.org/

Madison Township is one of the fifteen townships of Pickaway County, Ohio, United States. The 2020 census found 1,712 people in the township.

== Geography ==
Located in the northeastern corner of the county, it borders the following townships:

- Madison Township, Franklin County - north
- Bloom Township, Fairfield County - east
- Amanda Township, Fairfield County - southeast corner
- Walnut Township - south
- Harrison Township - west
- Hamilton Township, Franklin County - northwest corner

No municipalities are located in Madison Township.

Slate Run, a tributary to the Scioto River, runs through Madison Township. The township is home to the 1,705-acre Slate Run Metro Park.

== Name and history ==
It is one of twenty Madison Townships statewide.

== Government ==
The township is governed by a three-member board of trustees, who are elected in November of odd-numbered years to a four-year term beginning on the following January 1. Two are elected in the year after the presidential election and one is elected in the year before it. There is also an elected township fiscal officer, who serves a four-year term beginning on April 1 of the year after the election, which is held in November of the year before the presidential election. Vacancies in the fiscal officership or on the board of trustees are filled by the remaining trustees.
