= Truro Township, Franklin County, Ohio =

Township in Ohio, US

- Township
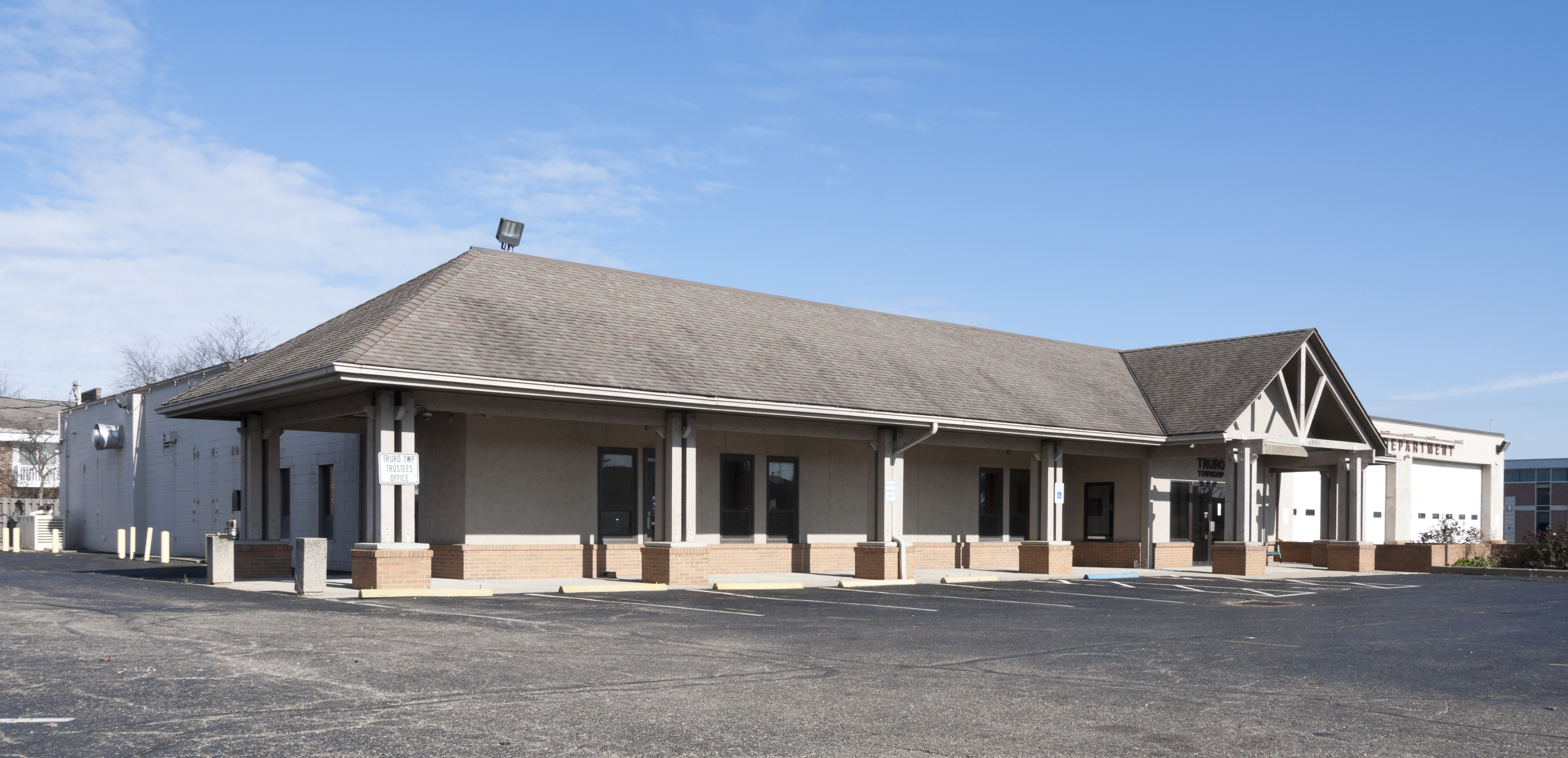
- Truro Township Townhall

- Location of Truro Township in Franklin County.
- Coordinates: 39°57′15″N 82°48′46″W
- Country: United States
- State: Ohio
- County: Franklin

Area
  - Total: 7.4 sq mi (19 km^{2})
  - Land: 7.3 sq mi (19 km^{2})
  - Water: 0.1 sq mi (0.26 km^{2})
- Elevation: 890 ft (270 m)

Population (2020)
  - Total: 30,401
  - Density: 4,200/sq mi (1,600/km^{2})
- Time zone: UTC-5 (Eastern (EST))
  - Summer (DST): UTC-4 (EDT)
- FIPS code: 39-77714
- GNIS feature ID: 1086115

Truro Township is one of the seventeen townships of Franklin County, Ohio, United States. The 2020 census found 30,401 people in the township.

== Geography ==
Located in the eastern part of the county, it borders the following cities and townships:

- Jefferson Township - north
- Pataskala - northeast
- Etna Township - east
- Liberty Township - southeast
- Madison Township - south
- Columbus - west

Most of what was once Truro Township has been annexed by the cities of Reynoldsburg, in the east, and Columbus everywhere else, although the village of Brice is located in southern Truro Township, and several small unincorporated portions remain. The census-designated place of Blacklick Estates is shared by Truro Township and Madison Township.

== Name and history ==
Truro Township owes its name to Truro, Nova Scotia, the former hometown of the Taylor family of early settlers, who came to Ohio encouraged by the United States Congress to begin a new life in the Refugee Tract after having their estates seized by the British government for supporting the American Revolution.

It is the only Truro Township statewide.

== Government ==
The township is governed by a three-member board of trustees, who are elected in November of odd-numbered years to a four-year term beginning on the following January 1. Two are elected in the year after the presidential election and one is elected in the year before it. There is also an elected township fiscal officer, who serves a four-year term beginning on April 1 of the year after the election, which is held in November of the year before the presidential election. Vacancies in the fiscal officership or on the board of trustees are filled by the remaining trustees.

== Services ==
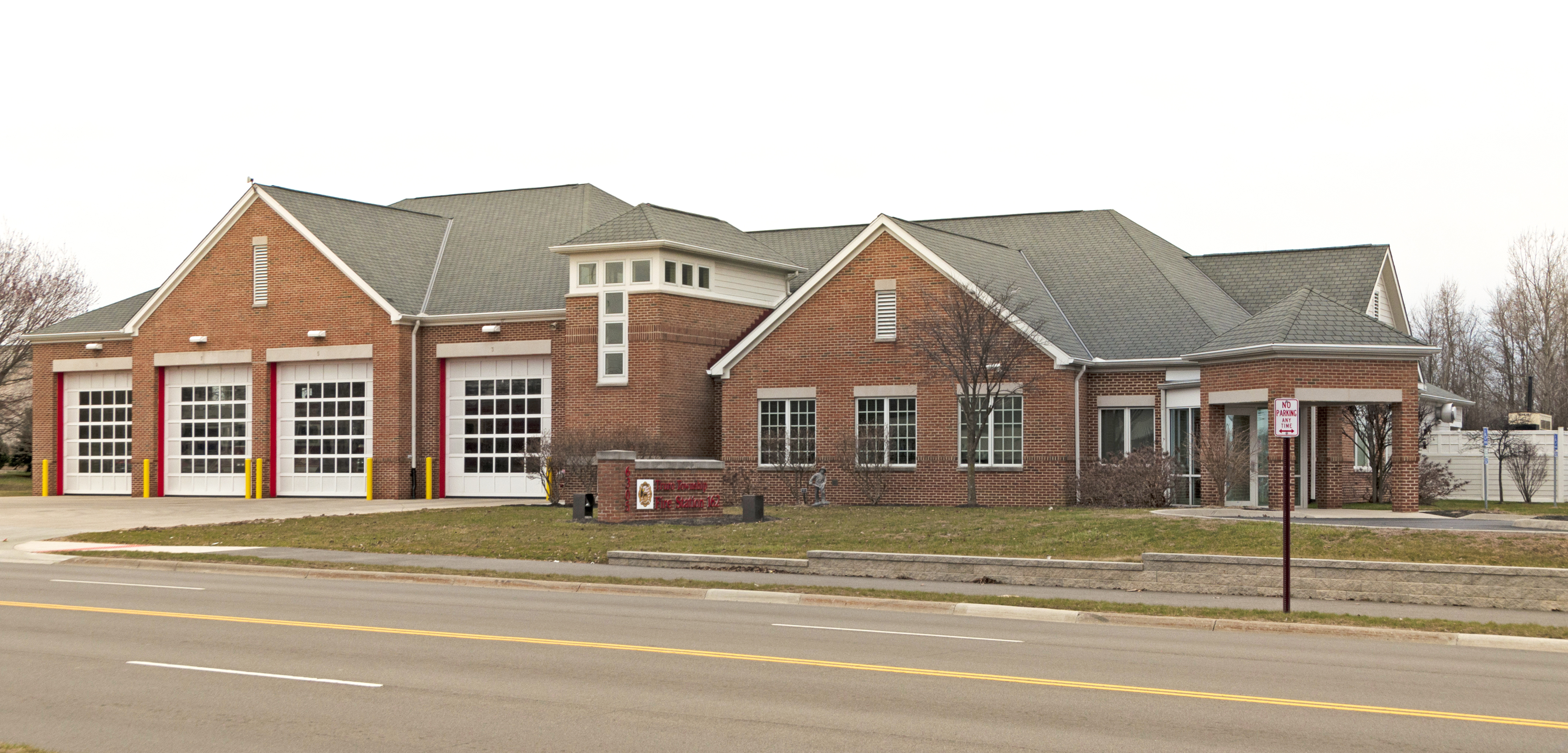
Truro Township Fire Department Headquarters

The township provides fire and EMS protection for the city of Reynoldsburg, the village of Brice as well as the unincorporated areas of the township. They also provide road maintenance in the unincorporated areas of the township and operate Silent Home Cemetery in Reynoldsburg.

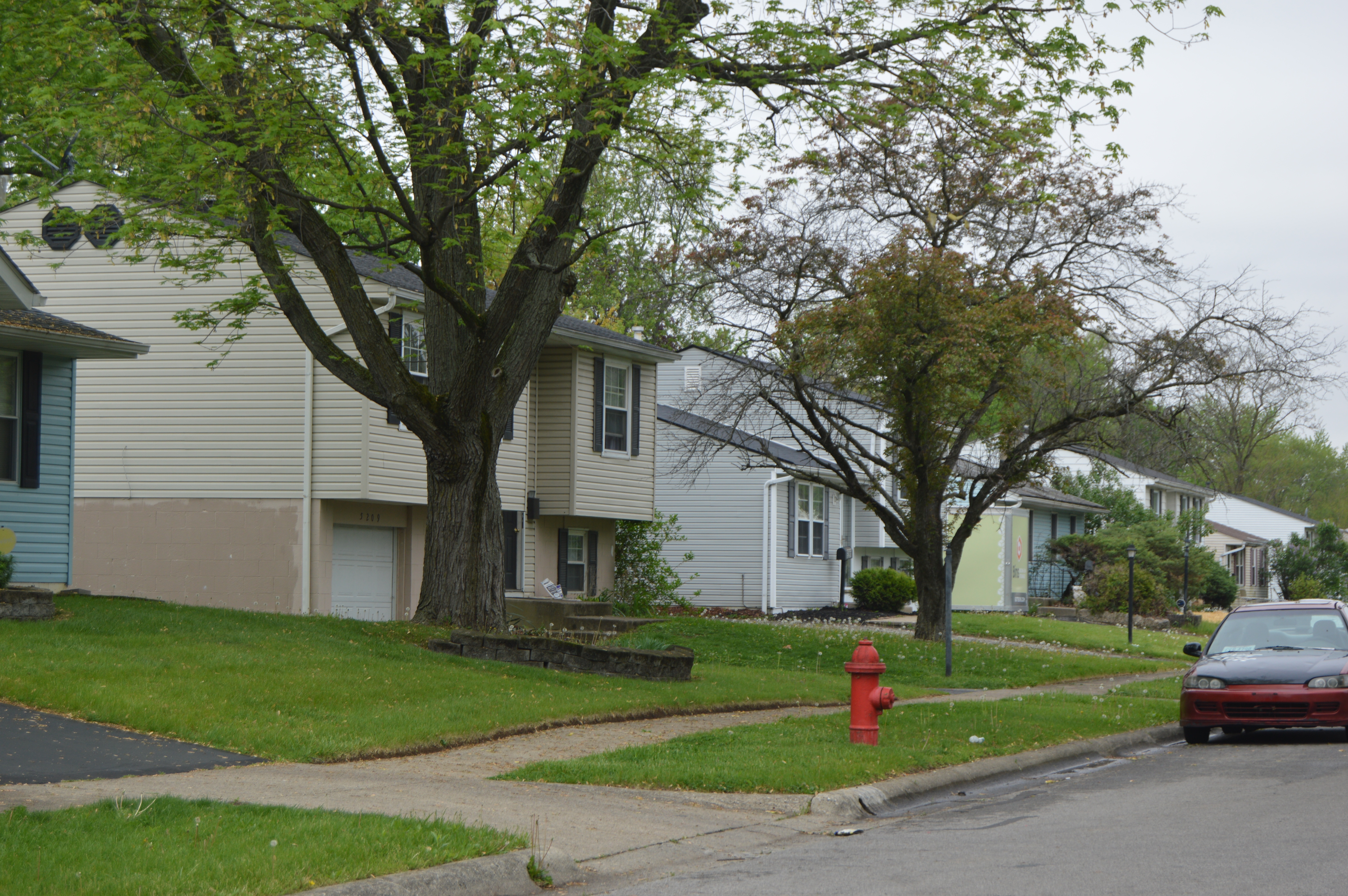
Houses on Parkline Drive

== Notable residents ==
Congressman Edward Taylor (1869-1938), grandson of early settler David Taylor.
