= Grace Marie Bareis =

American mathematician (1875–1962)

- Born: December 19, 1875; Canal Winchester, Ohio
- Died: June 15, 1962 (aged 86); Columbus, Ohio
- Education: Heidelberg University Ohio State University
- Known for: Receiving the first doctorate in mathematics at Ohio State University
- Scientific career
- Fields: Mathematics
- Workplaces: Ohio State University
- Thesis: Imprimitive Substitution Groups of Degree Sixteen (1909)
- Doctoral advisor: Harry W. Kuhn

Grace Marie Bareis (December 19, 1875 – June 15, 1962) was an American mathematician and educator who became the first person to receive a doctorate degree in mathematics from Ohio State University. Bareis was an assistant professor at Ohio State University where she taught for 40 years until her eventual retirement in 1946.

== Early life and education ==
Grace Marie Bareis was born on December 19, 1875, in Canal Winchester, Ohio, to George Frederick Bareis and Amanda Jane. Bareis attended public school in her hometown, and then went on to attend Heidelberg University in Ohio. She graduated as valedictorian of her class and received her A.B degree in 1897. Bareis then completed part of her graduate work at Bryn Mawr College during 1897–1899, and later at Columbia University in that same year She took a brief break from school to work as a teacher at Miss Roney's School in Philadelphia where she would continue to work for the next six years. Two years after leaving Columbia University, she returned to Bryn Mawr College to continue her work on a mathematics degree. In 1906, Bareis enrolled in the graduate program at Ohio State University and after three years received the first Ph.D. in mathematics from the university. Her dissertation, "Imprimitive Substitution Groups of Degree Sixteen", was directed by Harry W. Kuhn.

== Career ==
During her graduate work at Ohio State University in 1908, Bareis became an assistant professor of mathematics. She held the position until her retirement in 1946. While serving as an assistant professor, she helped to direct master thesis of her students and also held various other positions in the Education and Women College. Bareis taught mathematics to World War II veterans in a class called the "Army Specialized Training Program" and even did so two years after her retirement because of a shortage of math instructors.

== Personal life ==
Bareis was involved with various organizations. Her religious associations include the Evangelical and Reformed Church, Missionary Society, and Indianola Methodist Church. She was a founding member of the Mathematical Association of America, volunteered at the American Red Cross, and belonged to the Daughters of the American Revolution as well as the Ohio Historical Society. Bareis was a part of numerous groups at Ohio State University such as the OSU Faculty Club and OSU Alumnae Association. She was also a part of the Board of Trustees of Heidelberg College who awarded her an honorary doctorate in 1950.

She enjoyed gardening and tending to her farm in Brice, Ohio.

== Later life and legacy ==
In 1949, Bareis donated $2000 to Ohio State University to celebrate its 75th anniversary and to provide funding for a written competition between sophomores. "The Grace M. Bareis Mathematical Prize" (part of the Rasor-Bareis-Gordon) competition has been held annually in her honor ever since.

Bareis had a home in Canal Winchester, Ohio, but she began living in Columbus with her friend and colleague, Margaret F. Jones, near the start of her retirement. She lived with her for 26 years until a prolonged illness caused her death on June 15, 1962.

The Bareis Hall of Science in Heidelberg University was built in her honor.
