= Slate Run Metro Park =

Park and nature preserve in Pickaway County, Ohio

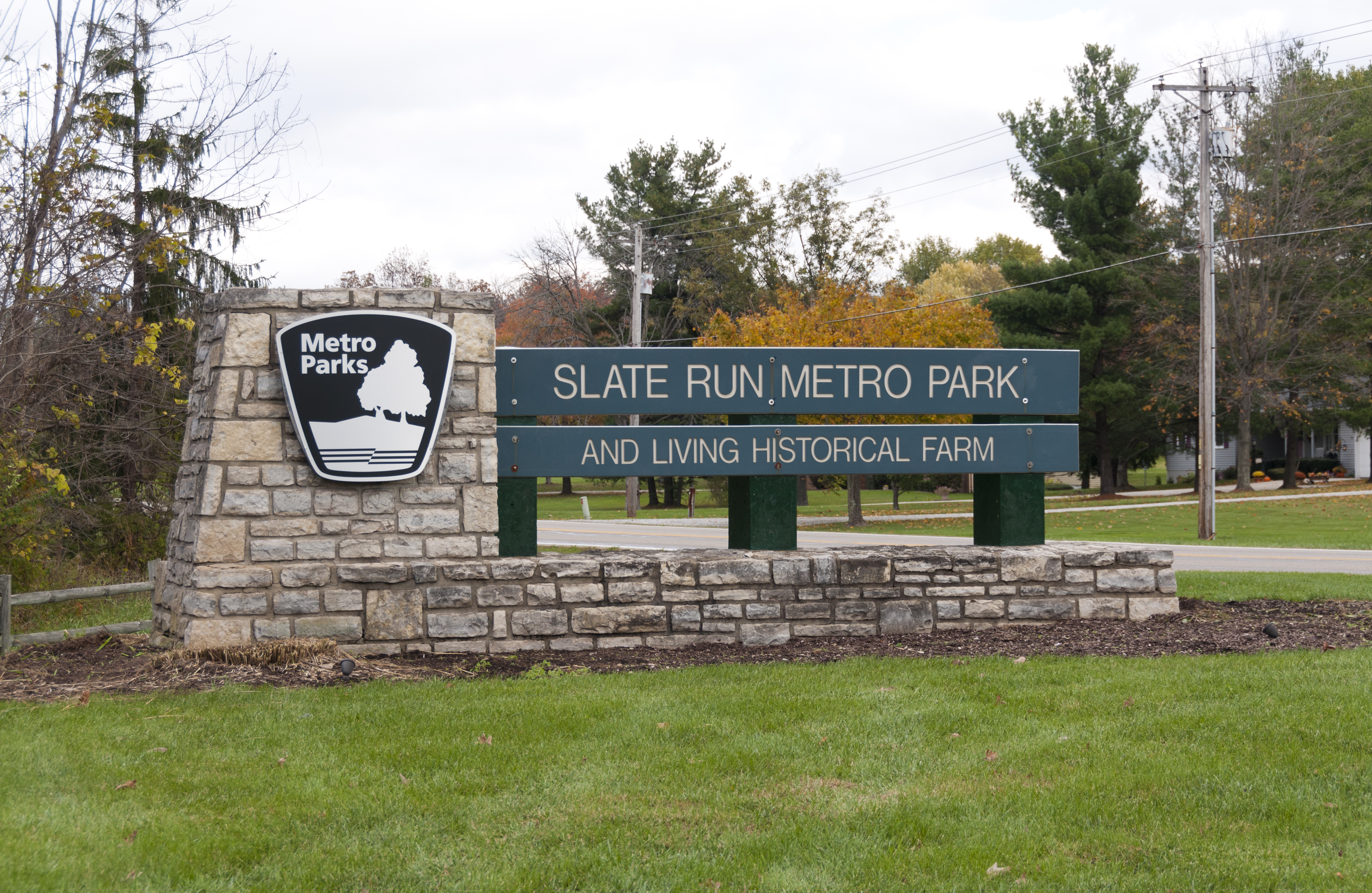
- Entrance sign
- Interactive map of Slate Run Metro Park
- Location: 1375 State Route 674 North, Canal Winchester, Ohio
- Coordinates: 39.760940°N 82.850537°W
- Area: 300 acres (120 ha) (farm)
- Opened: 1981 (farm)
- Administrator: Columbus and Franklin County Metro Parks
- Visitors: about 250,000 annually
- Parking: Multiple lots
- Website: Official website
- Fridley-Oman Farm
- U.S. National Register of Historic Places
- NRHP reference No.: 75001517
- Added to NRHP: December 6, 1975

Slate Run Metro Park is a public park and nature preserve in Madison Township in Pickaway County, Ohio. The park is managed by the Columbus and Franklin County Metro Parks in the Columbus metropolitan area. The park features numerous trails through grasslands, wetlands, forests, and meadows. The park's main water feature is Buzzard's Roost Lake, while nearby Slate Run Creek passes through the park. Amenities include picnic areas and shelters, boardwalks and fishing docks, and several sets of play equipment.

South of Canal Winchester, this park's most notable feature is an 1880s era working historical farm staffed by volunteers. Visitors can see the 19th century farm life, interact with the farm animals, and learn about canning and meat preservation. Other parts of the park include extensive hiking trails and a restored wetland area.

== Attributes and history ==
The Slate Run Living Historical Farm recreates the lifestyle of the farm on the site in the 1880s. The original farm, located in the Ohio countryside in northern Pickaway County, closed by the 1960s or 1970s due to the changing farm economy. The Metro Parks system acquired the farm and its 300 acres in the 1970s, including the farmhouse from 1856 and barn from 1881. The Metro Parks had the old farmhouse restored to how it would appear new, and opened the site to the public in 1981. The staff teach visitors (especially children) about Ohio's agricultural history, using tools, animal species, and practices from the 1880s. The staff dress in period clothing to keep the feel of the farm intact. Planting, growing, and harvesting is all done with methods from the 1800s, and the food is cooked on wood-burning stoves for staff meals. Running water comes from a pump nearby.

The farm's house and barn were added to the National Register of Historic Places in 1975.

== Gallery ==
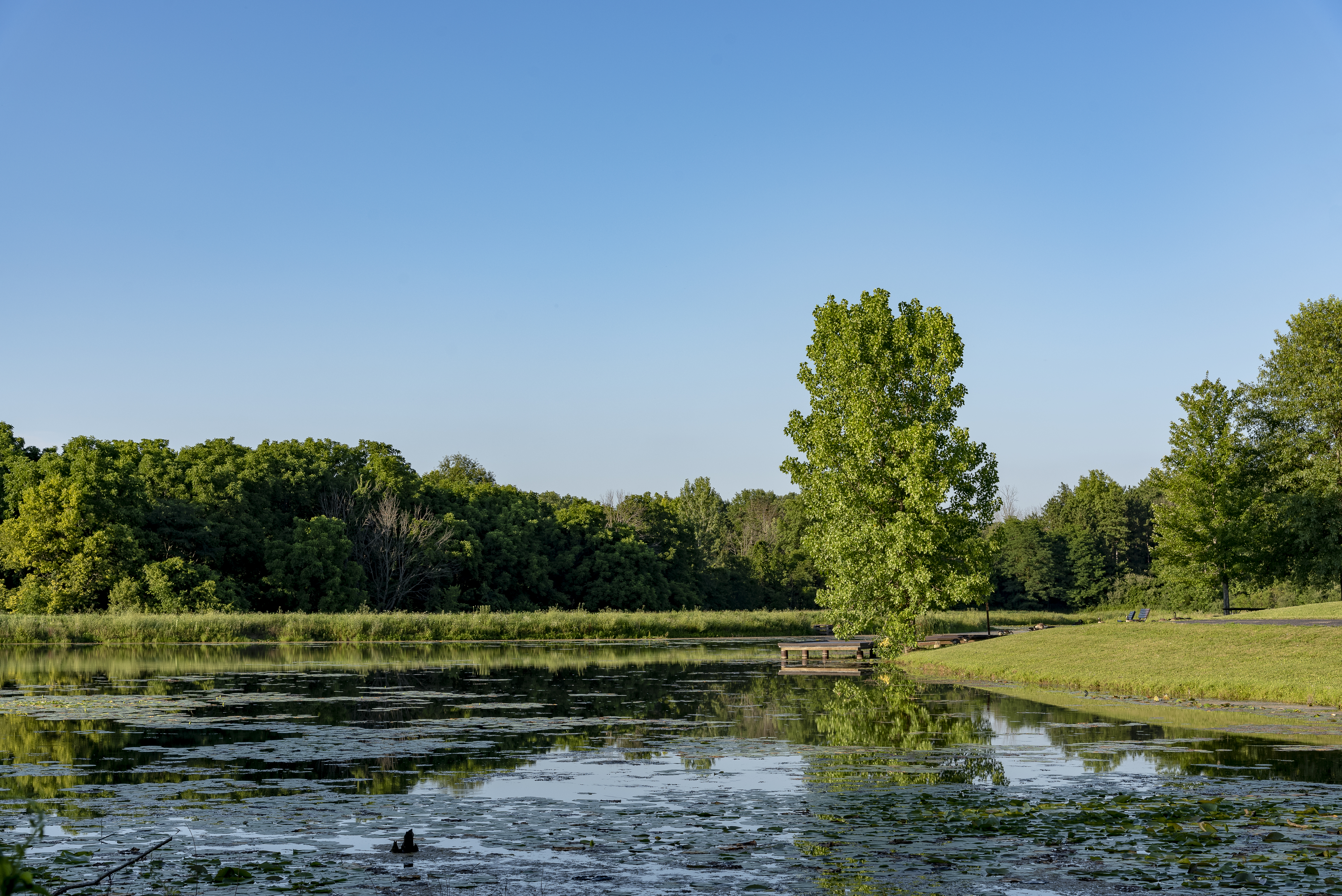
Buzzard's Roost Lake

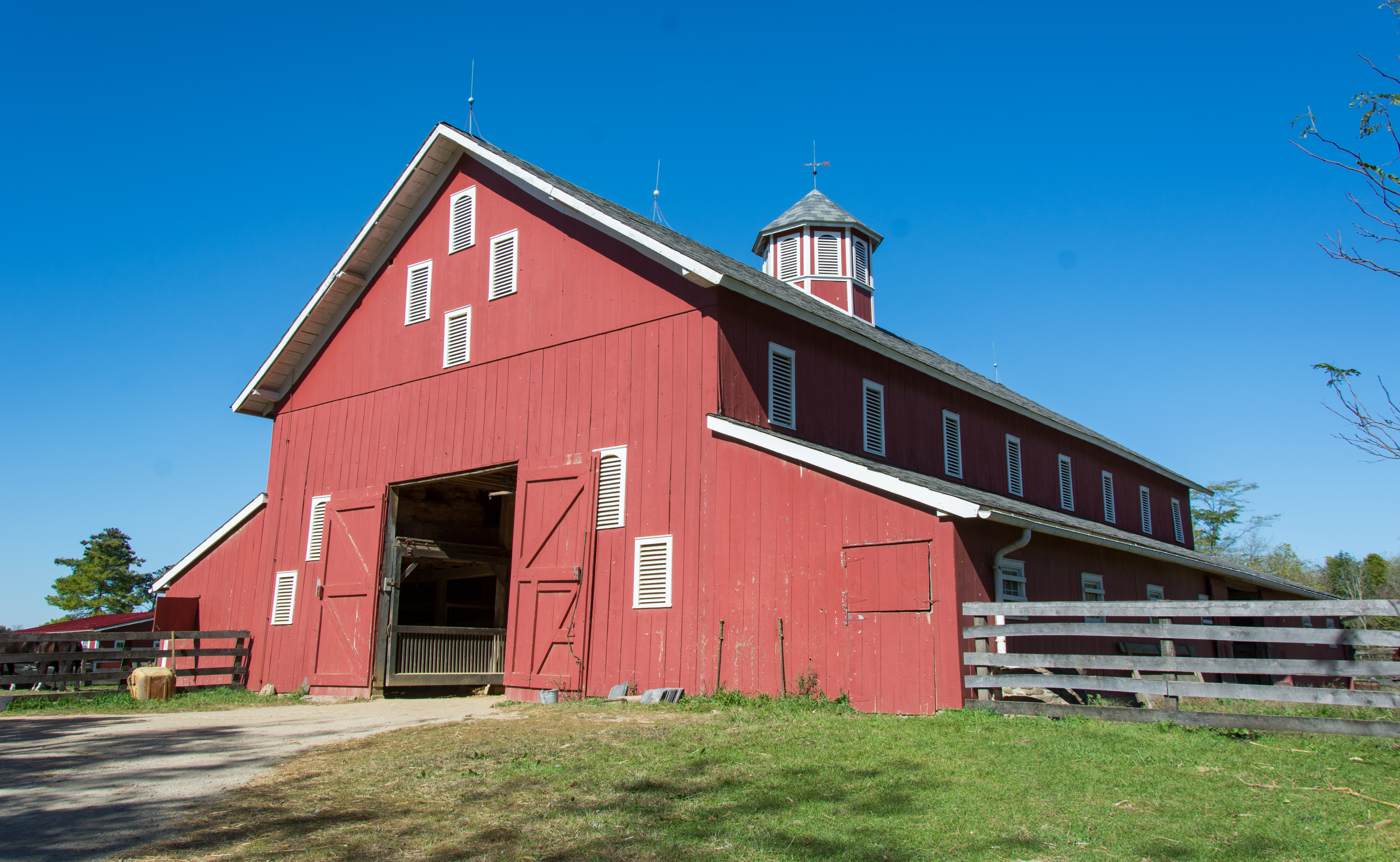
1881 barn

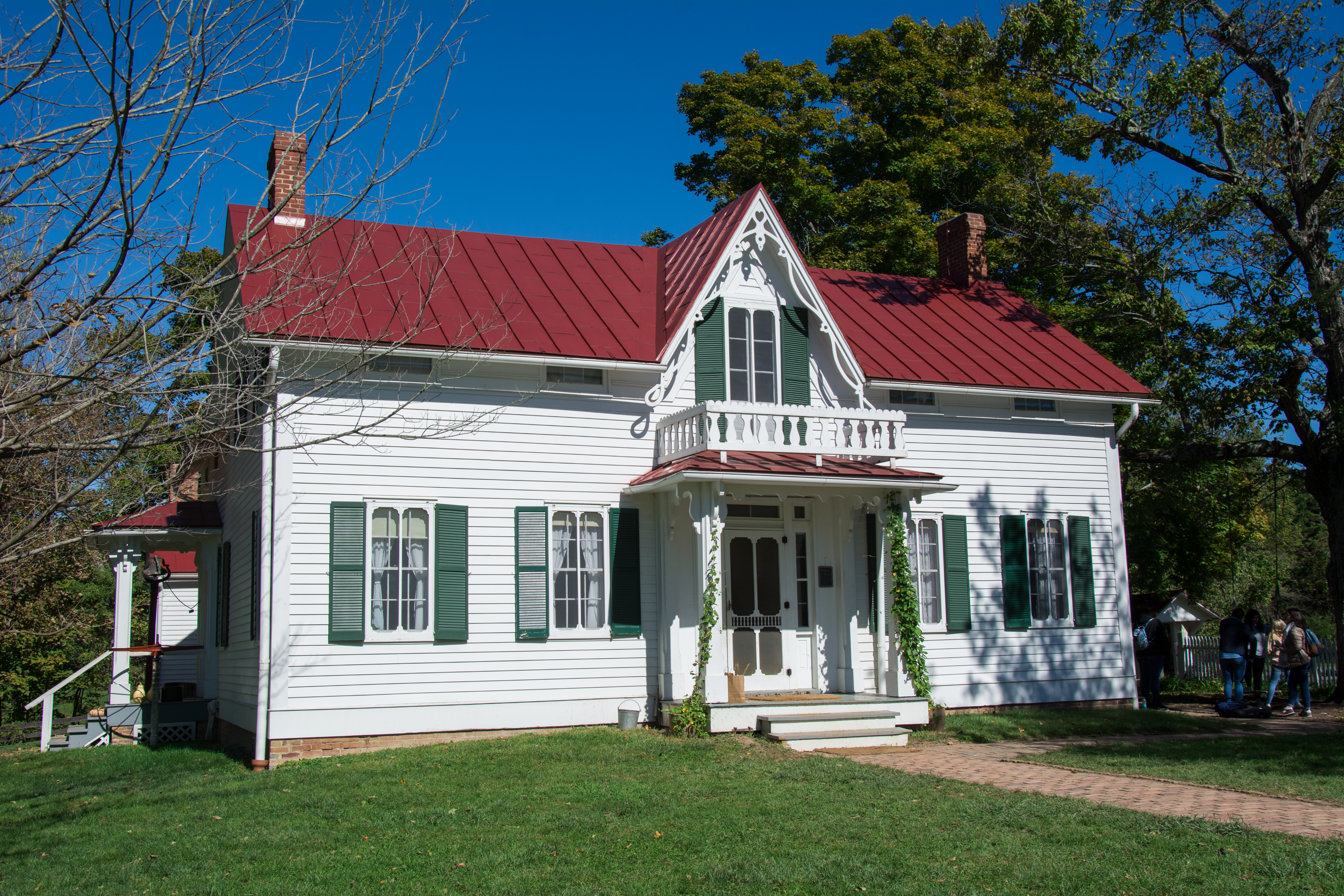
1856 farmhouse

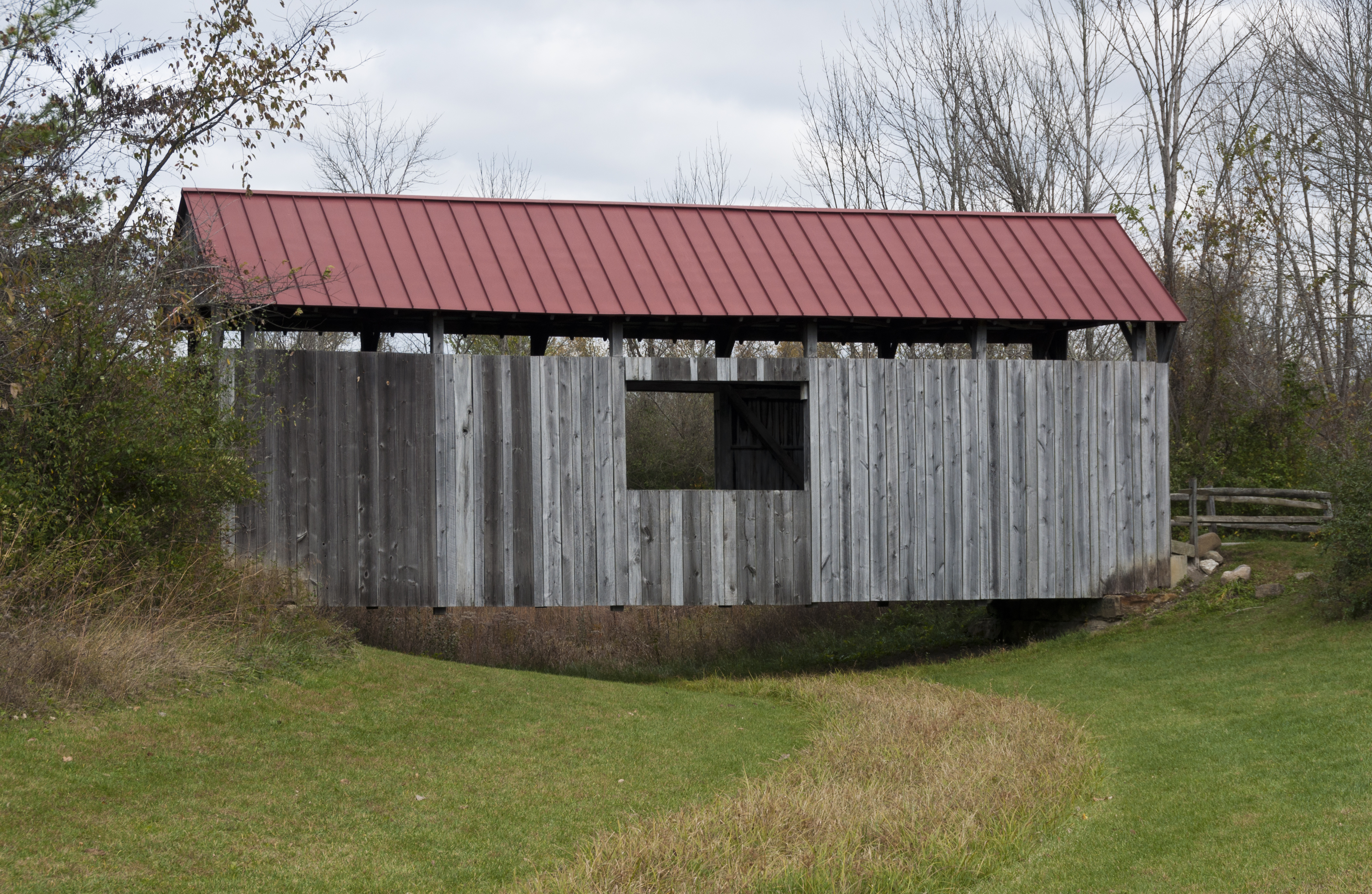
Covered bridge

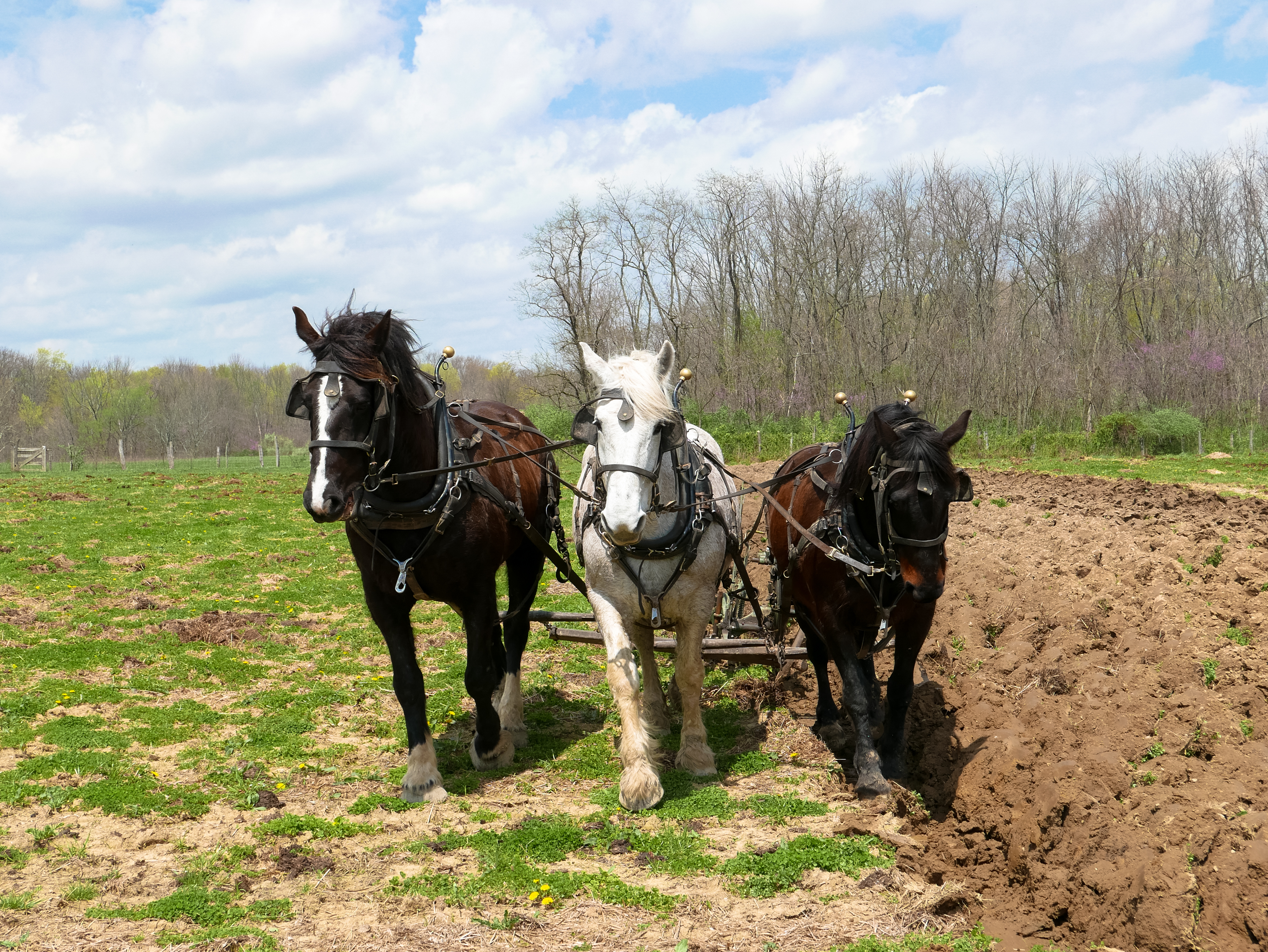
Horse-drawn farm equipment at Slate Run
