= Harrison Township, Pickaway County, Ohio =

Township in Ohio, US

- Township
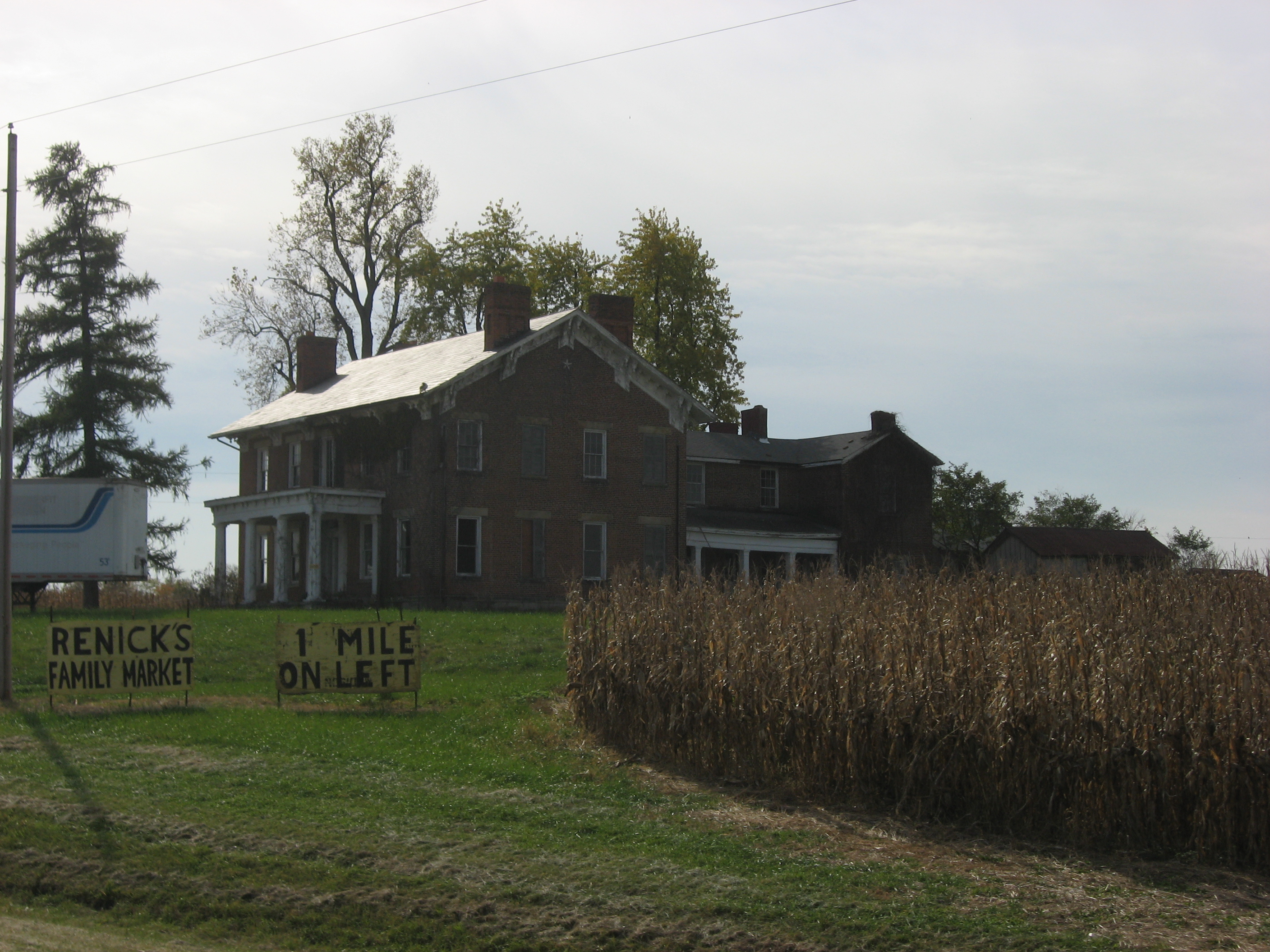
- The Renick Farmhouse, a historic site in the township

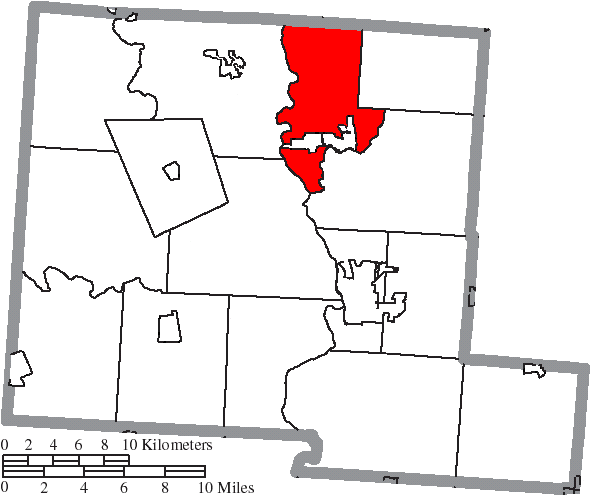
- Location of Harrison Township in Pickaway County
- Coordinates: 39°43′49″N 82°58′12″W
- Country: United States
- State: Ohio
- County: Pickaway

Area
  - Total: 28.0 sq mi (72.5 km^{2})
  - Land: 27.6 sq mi (71.6 km^{2})
  - Water: 0.35 sq mi (0.9 km^{2})
- Elevation: 702 ft (214 m)

Population (2020)
  - Total: 8,274
  - Density: 299/sq mi (115.6/km^{2})
- Time zone: UTC-5 (Eastern (EST))
  - Summer (DST): UTC-4 (EDT)
- FIPS code: 39-33978
- GNIS feature ID: 1086795
- Website: https://harrisonpickaway.com/

Harrison Township is one of the fifteen townships of Pickaway County, Ohio, United States. The 2020 census found 8,274 people in the township.

== Geography ==
Located in the northern part of the county, it borders the following townships:

- Hamilton Township, Franklin County - north
- Madison Township, Franklin County - northeast corner
- Madison Township - east
- Walnut Township - southeast
- Jackson Township - southwest
- Scioto Township - west

Two incorporated villages are located in Harrison Township: Ashville in the southeast, and South Bloomfield in the southwest.

== Name and history ==
It is one of nineteen Harrison Townships statewide.

== Government ==
The township is governed by a three-member board of trustees, who are elected in November of odd-numbered years to a four-year term beginning on the following January 1. Two are elected in the year after the presidential election and one is elected in the year before it. There is also an elected township fiscal officer, who serves a four-year term beginning on April 1 of the year after the election, which is held in November of the year before the presidential election. Vacancies in the fiscal officership or on the board of trustees are filled by the remaining trustees.
