= Blacklick Creek =

Blacklick Creek may refer to:

- Blacklick Creek (Ohio), a tributary of Big Walnut Creek
- Blacklick Creek (Pennsylvania), a tributary of the Conemaugh River
