= Winchester, Ohio =

Winchester, Ohio may refer to:

- Winchester, Adams County, Ohio
- Winchester, Brown County, Ohio
- Winchester, Jackson County, Ohio
- Winchester, Richland County, Ohio
- Canal Winchester, Ohio
