= Hamilton Township, Franklin County, Ohio =

Township in Ohio, US

- Township
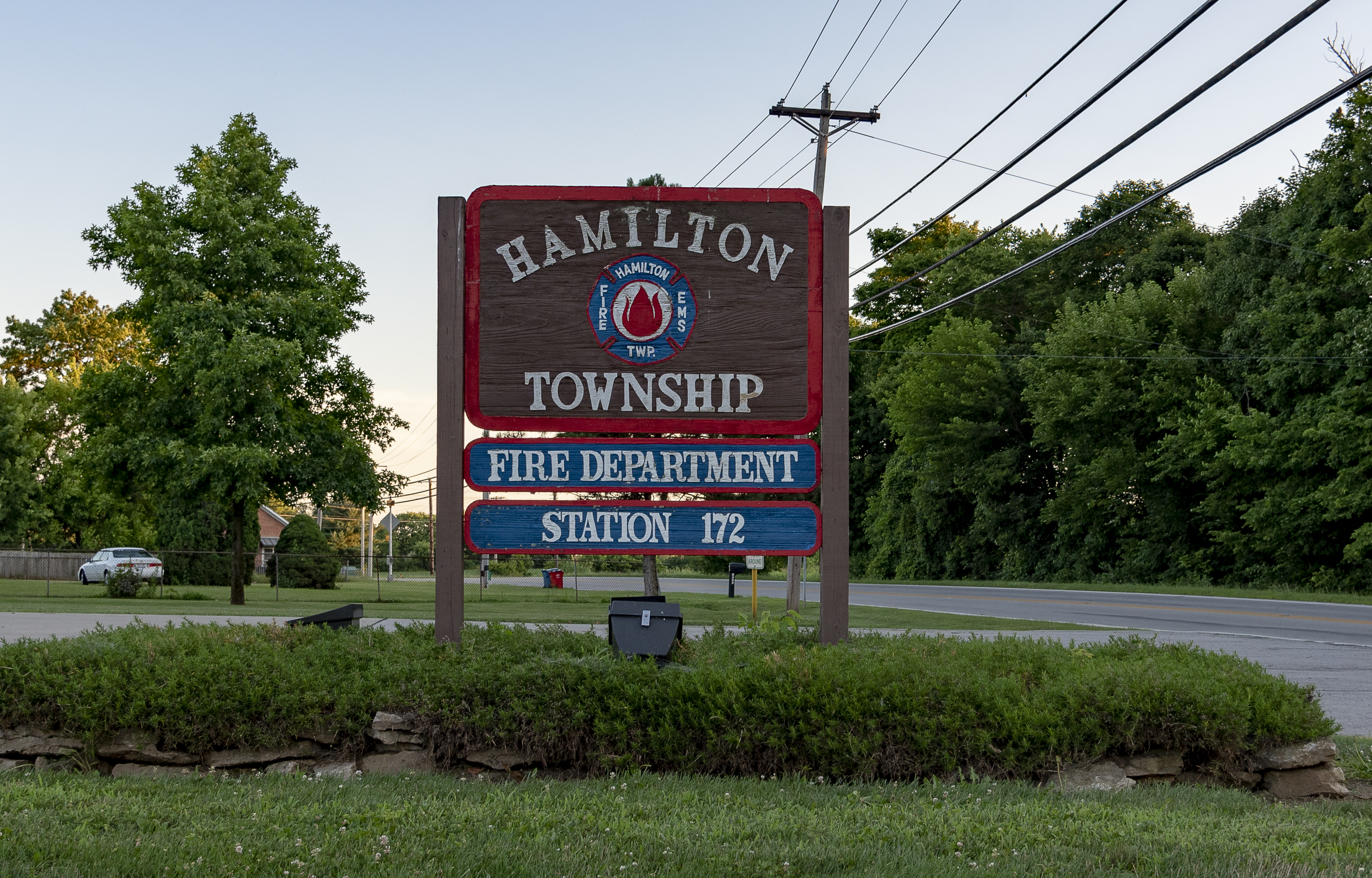
- Hamilton Township Fire Department sign

- Location of Hamilton Township in Franklin County
- Coordinates: 39°50′58″N 82°57′48″W
- Country: United States
- State: Ohio
- County: Franklin

Area
  - Total: 14.0 sq mi (36 km^{2})
  - Land: 13.4 sq mi (35 km^{2})
  - Water: 0.6 sq mi (1.6 km^{2})
- Elevation: 699 ft (213 m)

Population (2020)
  - Total: 8,634
  - Density: 644/sq mi (249/km^{2})
- Time zone: UTC-5 (Eastern (EST))
  - Summer (DST): UTC-4 (EDT)
- FIPS code: 39-33026
- GNIS feature ID: 1086104
- Website: www.hamtwpfcoh.gov

Hamilton Township is one of the seventeen townships of Franklin County, Ohio, United States. The 2020 census found 8,634 people in the township.

== Geography ==
Located in the southern part of the county, it has the following borders:

- Columbus - north
- Madison Township - east
- Madison Township, Pickaway County - southeast corner
- Harrison Township, Pickaway County - south
- Scioto Township, Pickaway County - southwest
- Jackson Township - west

Most of northern and western Hamilton Township is occupied by the city of Columbus, the county seat of Franklin County. The villages of Lockbourne and Obetz are located in the southern and northeastern part of the township respectively. Near the southeast corner of the township lies Rickenbacker Air National Guard Base.

== Government ==
The township is governed by a three-member board of trustees, who are elected in November of odd-numbered years to a four-year term beginning on the following January 1. Two are elected in the year after the presidential election and one is elected in the year before it. There is also an elected township fiscal officer, who serves a four-year term beginning on April 1 of the year after the election, which is held in November of the year before the presidential election. Vacancies in the fiscal officership or on the board of trustees are filled by the remaining trustees.

== Landmarks ==
- Scioto Downs, located on U.S. Route 23, is a horse racing track and the site of the OHSAA State Cross Country Championships.

== Gallery ==
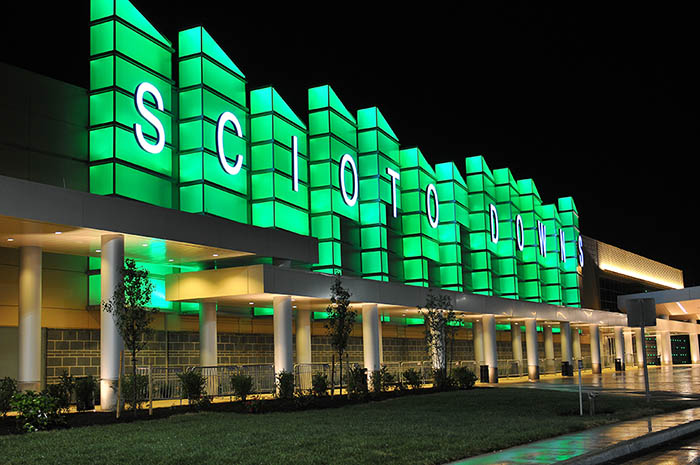
Scioto Downs

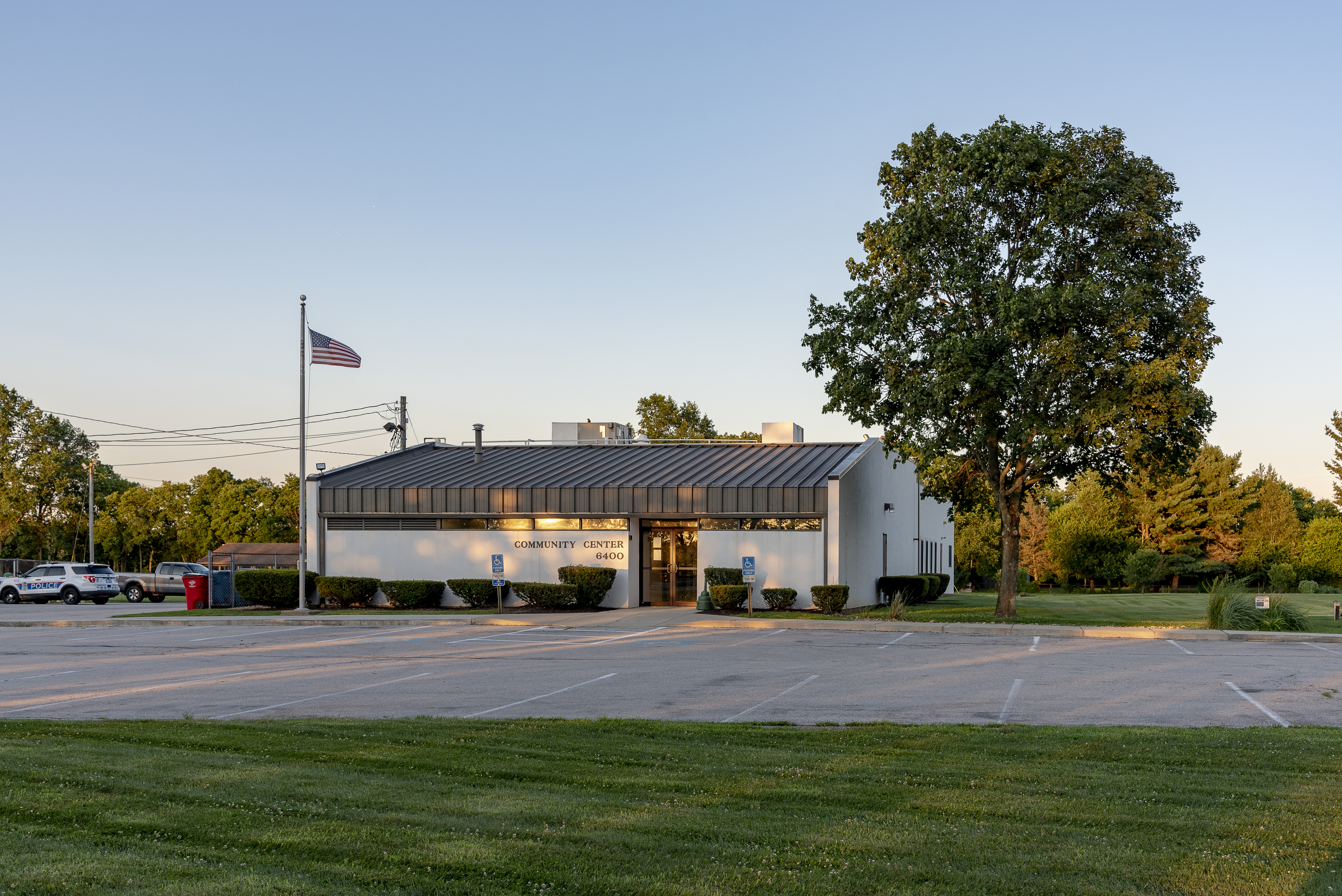
Hamilton Township Community Center

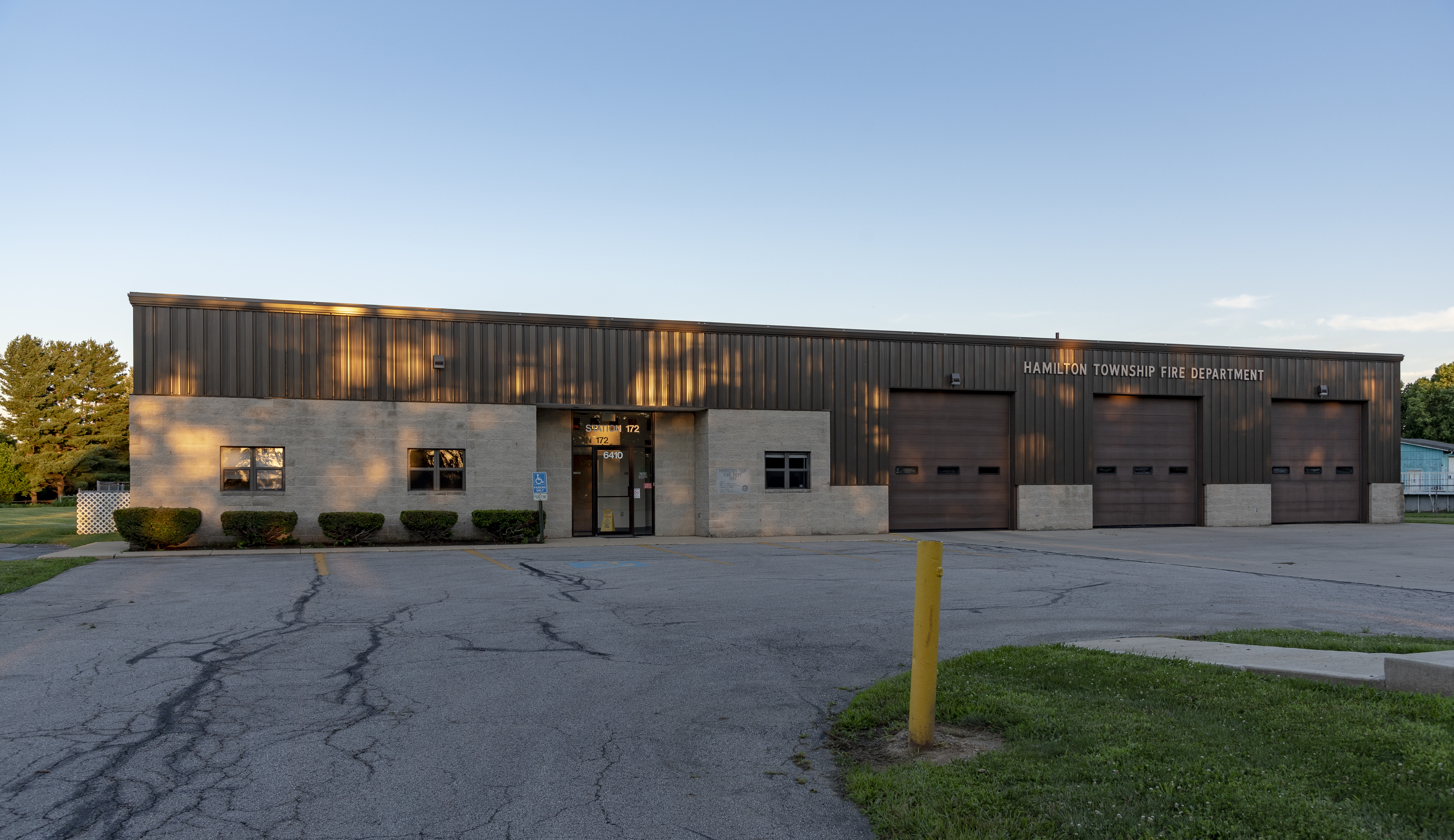
Fire Department Headquarters
