= Blacklick Estates, Ohio =

- Census-designated place
- Interactive map of Blacklick Estates, Ohio
- Coordinates: 39°54′17″N 82°52′20″W
- Country: United States
- State: Ohio
- County: Franklin
- Townships: Madison, Truro

Area
  - Total: 1.91 sq mi (4.94 km^{2})
  - Land: 1.89 sq mi (4.89 km^{2})
  - Water: 0.019 sq mi (0.05 km^{2})
- Elevation: 755 ft (230 m)

Population (2020)
  - Total: 8,990
  - Density: 4,761.5/sq mi (1,838.41/km^{2})
- Time zone: UTC-5 (Eastern (EST))
  - Summer (DST): UTC-4 (EDT)
- FIPS code: 39-06670
- GNIS feature ID: 2393339

Blacklick Estates is a census-designated place (CDP) in Franklin County, Ohio, United States: partly in Madison Township and partly in Truro Township. As of the 2020 census the population was 8,990.

== History ==
Three hundred homes in Blacklick Estates were flooded on September 14, 1979, when Blacklick Creek topped a levee due to heavy rains from Hurricane Frederic.

== Geography ==
Blacklick Estates is located in southeastern Franklin County. It is bordered to the north, east, and south by the city of Columbus, and to the west by unincorporated land in Madison Township. Ohio State Route 317 (S. Hamilton Road) forms the western edge of the CDP. Downtown Columbus is 10 miles (16 km) to the northwest.

According to the United States Census Bureau, the CDP has a total area of 1.92 square miles (4.96 km^{2}), of which 0.023 square miles (0.06 km^{2}), or 1.25%, is water.

== Demographics ==
Historical population
Census	Pop.	Note	%±
1970	8,351		—
1980	11,223		34.4%
1990	10,080		−10.2%
2000	9,518		−5.6%
2010	8,682		−8.8%
2020	8,990		3.5%

At the 2000 census there were 9,518 people, 3,317 households, and 2,567 families in the CDP. The population density was 4,775.3 inhabitants per square mile (1,843.8/km^{2}). There were 3,449 housing units at an average density of 1,730.4 per square mile (668.1/km^{2}). The racial makeup of the CDP was 86.72% White, 8.97% Black or African American, 0.38% Native American, 1.07% Asian, 0.11% Pacific Islander, 0.56% from other races, and 2.20% from two or more races. Hispanic or Latino people of any race were 1.26%.

There were 3,317 household, out of which 38.5% had children under the age of 18 living with them, 59.0% were married couples living together, 13.5% had a female householder with no husband present, and 22.6% were non-families. 16.8% of households were one person and 3.6% were one person aged 65 or older. The average household size was 2.87 and the average family size was 3.22.

The age distribution was 29.3% under the age of 18, 8.8% from 18 to 24, 32.5% from 25 to 44, 22.6% from 45 to 64, and 6.8% 65 or older. The median age was 33 years. For every 100 females there were 95.8 males. For every 100 females age 18 and over, there were 95.0 males.

The median household income was $47,277 and the median family income was $51,766. Males had a median income of $35,427 versus $26,805 for females. The per capita income is $18,385. About 4.0% of families and 5.5% of the population were below the poverty line, including 4.2% of those under age 18 and 11.2% of those age 65 or over.

In 2007, Blacklick Estates was listed as the second most affordable place to live in the U.S. by Money on CNNMoney.com.
