= Blacklick Woods Metro Park =

Park and nature preserve in Reynoldsburg, Ohio, U.S.

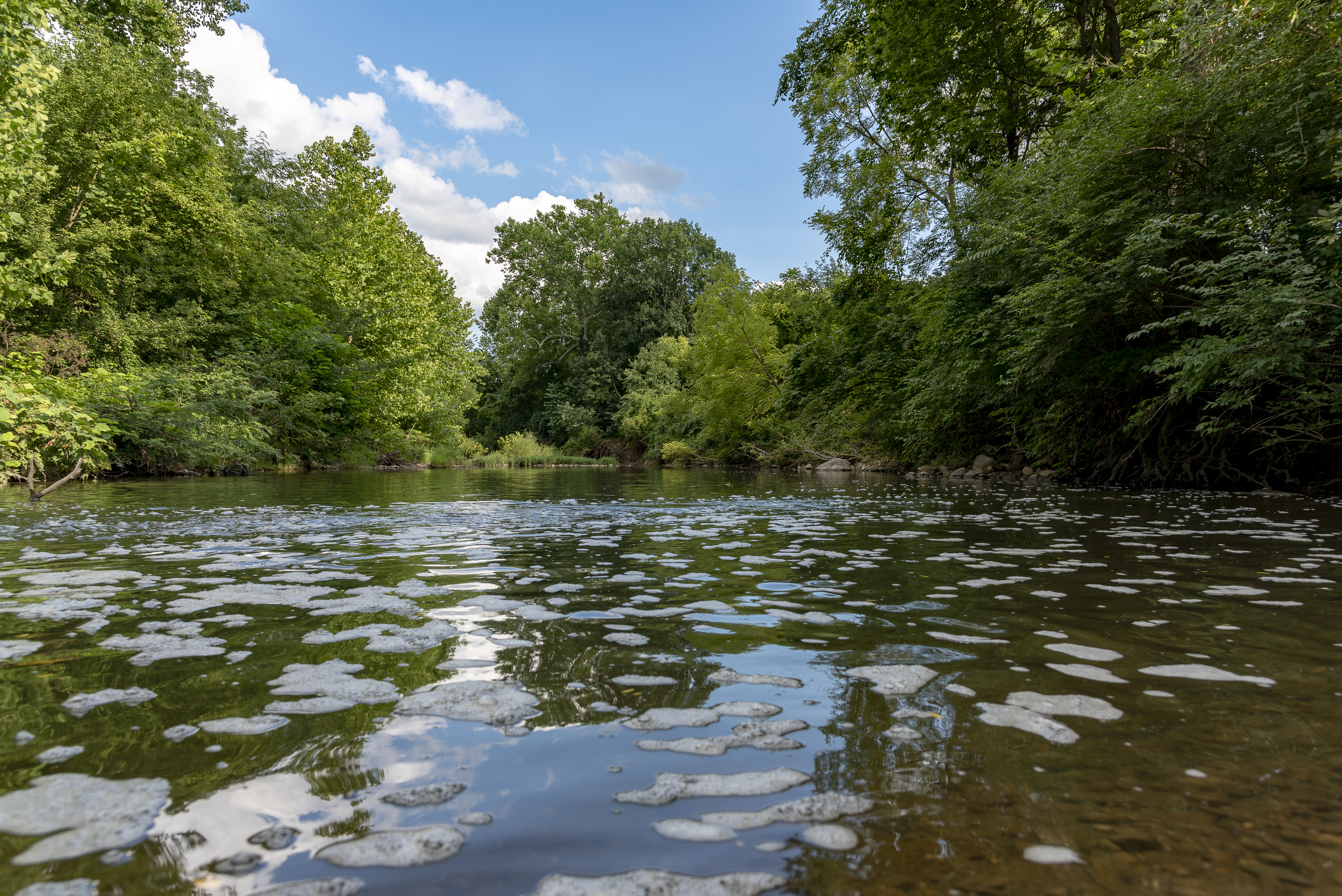
- Blacklick Creek as it travels through Blacklick Woods Metro Park
- Interactive map of Blacklick Woods Metro Park
- Type: Metro park
- Location: 6975 E. Livingston Avenue, Reynoldsburg, Ohio
- Coordinates: 39.9350°N 82.8075°W
- Area: 643 acres (260 ha)
- Opened: 1948
- Administrator: Columbus and Franklin County Metro Parks
- Open: Year-round
- Paths: 6
- Habitats: Forest, fields, swamp ponds, prairie
- Parking: Multiple lots
- Website: Official website

U.S. National Natural Landmark
- Designated: 1974

Blacklick Woods Metro Park is a metropolitan park in Reynoldsburg, Ohio, owned and operated by Columbus and Franklin County Metro Parks. The park was established in 1948, the first park in the Metro Park system. It was named a National Natural Landmark in 1974.

== Attributes ==
Blacklick Woods Metro Park has 643 acres (260 ha). Within a forested area in the park is the Walter A. Tucker State Nature Preserve preserving one of the oldest Beech-maple forest in central Ohio. In the southern area of the preserve you can find an assortment of white and pin oak, white ash with specimens of red maple, red elm, shagbark and bitternut hickory, hophornbeam, American hornbeam and dogwood. There are also wetlands and seasonable ponds in the southern area of the nature preserve where salamanders, chorus frogs, and wood ducks among other aquatic life and amphibians can be found. Fox, rabbits, and white-tailed deer can also be seen throughout the park. It is also well known as a good spot for bird watching. The golf course has been certified by Audubon International as a Cooperative Sanctuary. The Blacklick Woods Nature Center with naturalists and volunteers is also available to answer questions. Blacklick Creek flows south along the eastern boundary of the park and is accessible by several trails that travel through a variety of fields, meadows, and forests, The park also has a canopy walkway.

== History ==
The land for Blacklick Woods Metro Park was purchased in 1947 after the Columbus and Franklin County Metro Parks received funding. It was the first park in the Metro Parks system. The park was dedicated on October 24, 1948 despite concern it was too far in the country. Featuring graded roads and picnic facilities that could accommodate 400, it became a role model for the rest of the Metro Park system. By the 1950s, a trailside museum was created, often used in conjunction with the outdoor classroom and the small amphitheater. Trailside zoo houses were home to held up to 75 animals, from about 25 different species. It was later phased out of operation in the mid-1970s when the nature center was planned.

By the 1960s, the park was experiencing overcrowding, leading to the need for overflow parking, more picnic facilities, and damage of natural areas. To overcome these issues, a levey was passed in 1962 enabling the park to expand to 506 acres.

In 1973, the Blacklick Woods Golf Course was added to the park after the park's board purchased the nearby Stoney Creek Country Club to save it from development.

In 1974, Blacklick Woods was designated as a National Natural Landmark by the National Park Service.

In 2017, prehistoric circular earthworks were discovered at the park. The earthworks are believed to be made by Late Woodland pre-Columbian peoples who lived in Ohio between AD600 and AD1200.

== Golf score cards ==
Championship Course
Tee	Rating/Slope	1	2	3	4	5	6	7	8	9	Out	10	11	12	13	14	15	16	17	18	In	Total
Blue	72.4 / 124	387	400	375	559	184	565	390	415	200	3475	327	590	169	403	458	187	435	382	406	3357	6832
White	70.1 / 122	361	381	345	525	162	543	346	381	176	3220	308	543	132	371	448	179	388	361	366	3096	6316
SI	Men's	9	7	11	1	17	3	13	5	15		12	2	18	8	6	16	4	14	10
Par		4	4	4	5	3	5	4	4	3	36	4	5	3	4	5	3	4	4	4	36	72
Gold	67.2 / 120	358	268	345	460	158	476	322	306	135	2828	282	491	128	317	442	171	383	343	360	2917	5745
Red	68.0 / 116	301	265	309	456	116	413	280	305	100	2545	230	489	96	266	383	124	294	292	299	2475	5018
SI	Women's	8	10	6	2	16	4	14	12	18		13	1	17	11	3	15	7	9	5

Learning Course
Tee	Rating/Slope	1	2	3	4	5	6	7	8	9	Total
Blue		315	161	356	170	140	186	242	163	155	1888
SI	Men's	4	7	2	6	9	5	1	3	8
Red		298	138	337	154	124	174	190	108	143	1666
SI	Women's	1	7	2	5	8	3	9	4	6
Par		4	3	4	3	3	3	4	3	3	30
Gold		191	86	222	105	77	128	242	67	92	1097
Green		153	62	180	75	71	100	129	67	62	876

== See also ==
- List of National Natural Landmarks in Ohio
