= Blacklick Creek (Ohio) =

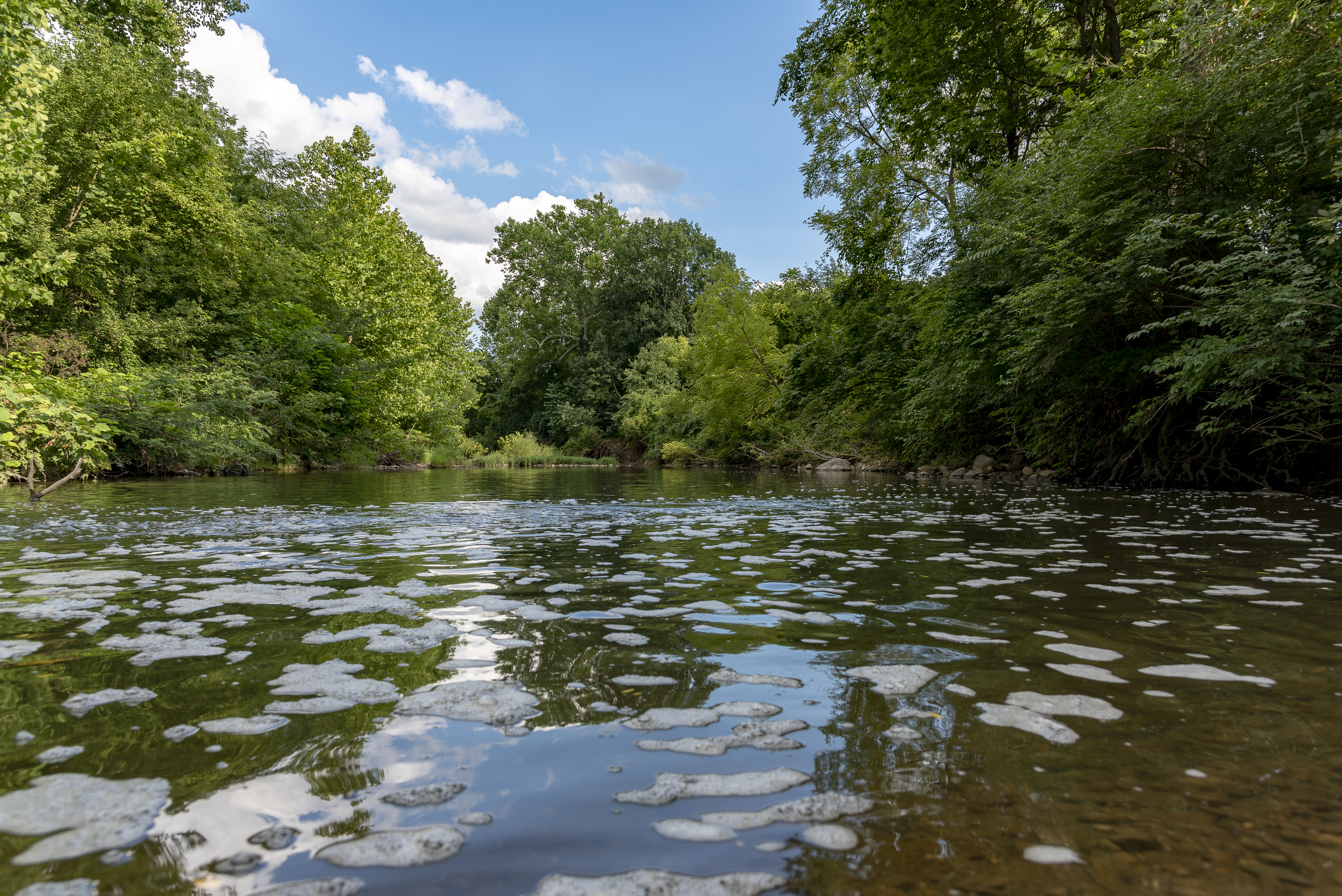
- Blacklick Creek in the Blacklick Woods Metro Park

Physical characteristics
- Source
  - location: ~ 4 mi (6.4 km) southwest of Johnstown
  - elevation: ~ 1,190 ft (360 m)
- Mouth
  - location: Big Walnut Creek near Obetz, Ohio
  - elevation: ~ 715 ft (218 m)
- Length: 27 mi (43 km)
- Basin size: 63 mi^{2} (160 km^{2})

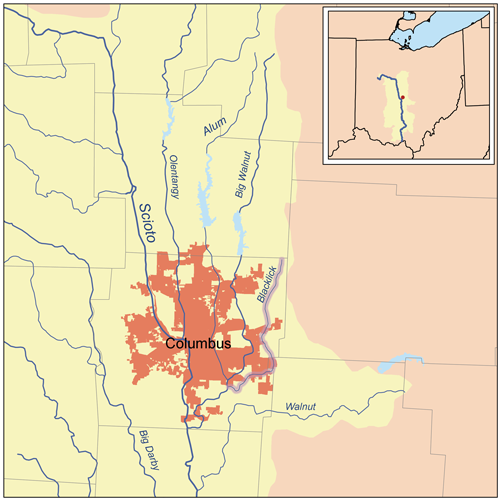
Map of Blacklick Creek highlighted within the Scioto River watershed.

Blacklick Creek is a tributary stream of Big Walnut Creek in Ohio, flowing through Licking, Fairfield and Franklin counties. The creek's name was originally given by Native Americans, who had noticed the animals that frequented the creek to lick its black-colored salt stones. It has also been known as Black Lick Creek, Black Lick Fork, Blacks Lick Creek, and Big Lick Creek.

The 27 mile long rock and slate bed creek has its headwaters near Mink Street in Jersey Township, in northwestern Licking County. It enters Franklin County in northeast Plain Township and then flows near the Licking-Franklin County border. The stream enters Fairfield County in southwest Reynoldsburg, and then re-enters Franklin County near Brice. The stream meets Big Walnut Creek in Columbus, near South Hamilton Road at 39°52′55″N 82°54′24″W.

Blacklick Creek topped a levee on September 14, 1979, due to heavy rains from Hurricane Frederic. The creek flooded the Municipal Building in Reynoldsburg, and three hundred homes in Blacklick Estates.

== See also ==
- List of rivers of Ohio
