= Slate Run (Ohio) =

River in the United States

Slate Run is a tributary to the Scioto River; it flows through the Northwest corner of Upper Arlington, Ohio. The creek gets its name from the slate that makes up the creek bed. It winds through a ravine and has several small, yet prominent waterfalls. The creek is mainly fed by stormwater runoff which makes the creek very susceptible to running dry during extended periods of no rain.

== Location ==
- Mouth: Confluence with the Scioto River in Upper Arlington at 40°03′08″N 83°05′46″W
- Origin: Upper Arlington near Ohio State University Airport at 40°04′35″N 83°04′58″W

== Other streams ==
The U.S. Geographic Names Information System lists seven streams named Slate Run in the State of Ohio.

== Wildlife ==
The wildlife that lives in the areas surrounding Slate Run is rather limited because of the nearby housing developments, which approach to within two hundred yards from the stream. However, the surrounding ravine does provide a home for white tail deer, owls, ducks, groundhogs, opossums and even the occasional fox.

== See also ==
- List of rivers of Ohio
- Slate Run Metro Park
