= Canal Winchester, Ohio =

- City
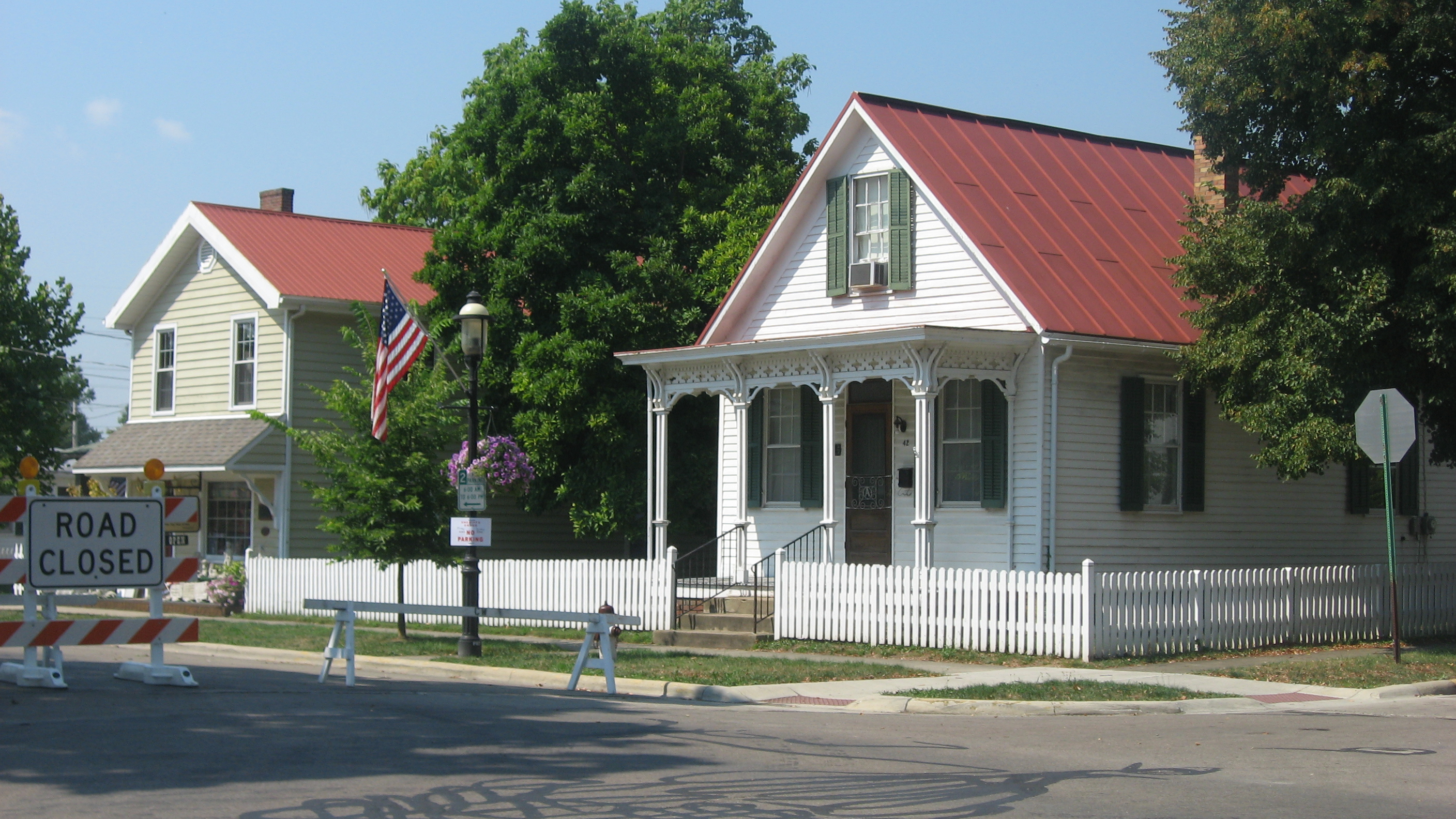
- North High Street District in Canal Winchester

- Flag Logo
- Interactive map of Canal Winchester, Ohio
- Location within Ohio Location within the United States
- Coordinates: 39°50′38″N 82°48′43″W
- Country: United States
- State: Ohio
- Counties: Franklin, Fairfield
- Townships: Madison, Violet, Bloom
- Founded: 1828
- Incorporated: 1866 (village)

Government
  - Type: Mayor–Council
  - Mayor: Joe Steager

Area
  - Total: 7.98 sq mi (20.68 km^{2})
  - Land: 7.85 sq mi (20.33 km^{2})
  - Water: 0.14 sq mi (0.36 km^{2})
- Elevation: 758 ft (231 m)

Population (2020)
  - Total: 9,107
  - Estimate (2023): 9,777
  - Density: 1,160.5/sq mi (448.06/km^{2})
- Time zone: UTC-5 (Eastern (EST))
  - Summer (DST): UTC-4 (EDT)
- ZIP code: 43110
- Area codes: 614 and 380
- FIPS code: 39-11332
- GNIS feature ID: 2397546
- Website: Canal Winchester, Ohio

Canal Winchester is a city in Fairfield and Franklin counties in the U.S. state of Ohio. The population was 9,107 at the 2020 census. It is a suburb in the Columbus metropolitan area.

== History ==
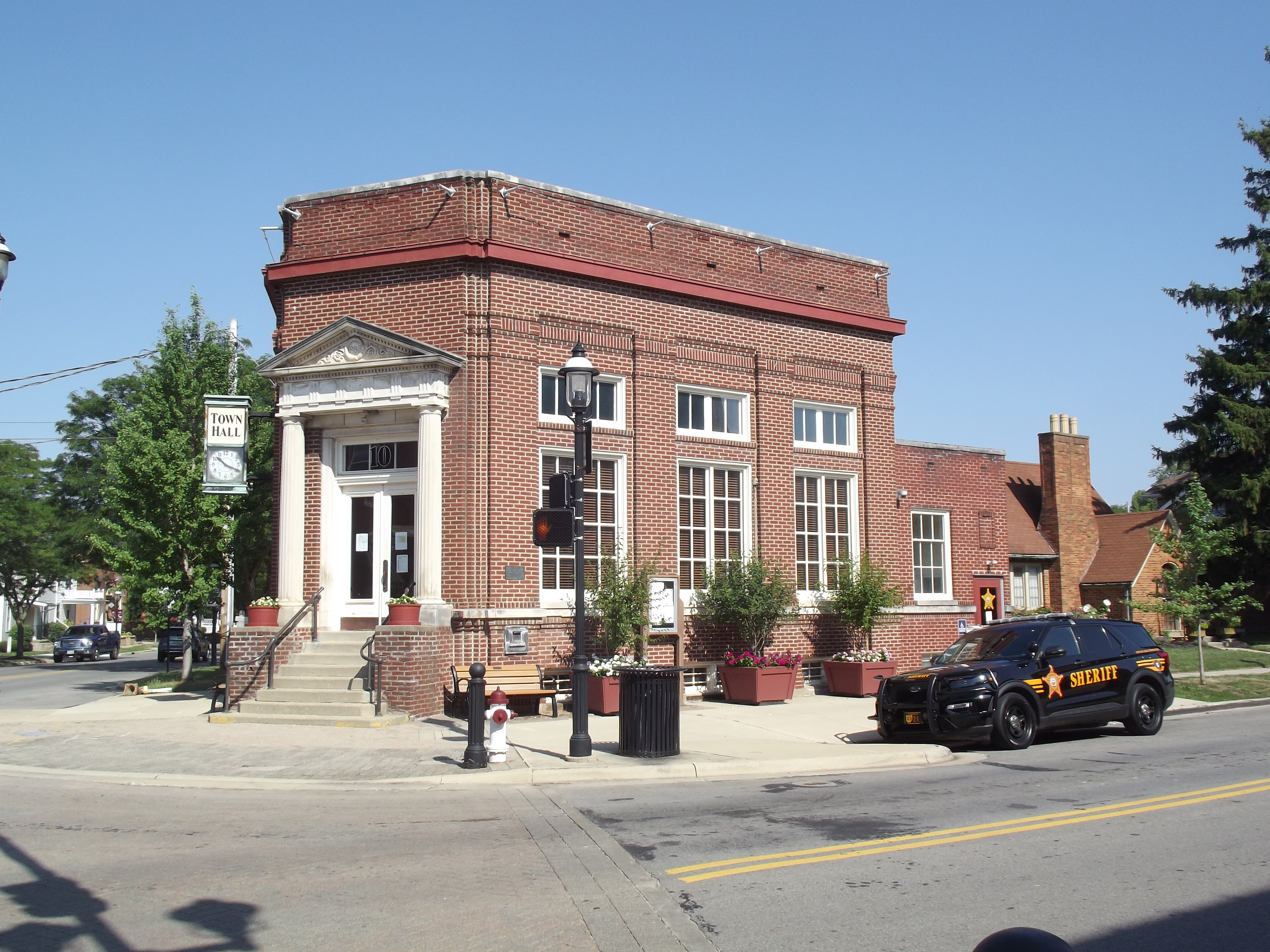
Former town hall, now a substation for the Fairfield County Sheriff's Office

Canal Winchester was founded in 1828 by Reuben Dove and John Colman. When construction of the Ohio & Erie Canal came through Dove's wheat field, he wanted to sue the state. The canal workmen instead convinced him that he would be better off laying out a town, because the area was midway between Columbus and Lancaster. On November 4, 1828, Dove and Colman recorded the first plat for Winchester, Ohio, in Violet Township, Fairfield County. Dove named the village after his father's hometown of Winchester, Virginia.

Winchester flourished because of agriculture and transportation. The Ohio and Erie Canal brought passengers, freight and a means to transport grain to market. The first canal boat floated through Winchester in 1831. The village was named Canal Winchester when the post office was established in 1841, because there were five other locations in the state named Winchester.

A local legend explains how Canal Winchester received its post office. On Halloween, October 31, 1841, two teenage boys, as a prank, hooked two horses up to the foundation of the post office of the town of Waterloo and then pulled it across the street to Winchester. With this, the town of Waterloo was no more and Winchester was a legitimate village. The village was annexed to Madison Township, Franklin County, in 1851.

In May 1866, the Ohio Secretary of State granted incorporation papers for the Village of Canal Winchester.

In 1869, the railroad came to Canal Winchester, causing economic growth.

== Geography ==
According to the United States Census Bureau, the village has a total area of 7.61 square miles (19.71 km^{2}), of which 7.47 square miles (19.35 km^{2}) is land and 0.14 square miles (0.36 km^{2}) is water.

=== Climate ===
Climate is characterized by relatively moderate temperatures and evenly distributed precipitation throughout the year. " The Köppen climate classification for the 43110 ZIP code, which encompasses parts of Columbus, Ohio, is Dfa. “Humid Continental Climate”

== Demographics ==
Historical population
Census	Pop.	Note	%±
1850	352		—
1860	459		30.4%
1870	633		37.9%
1880	650		2.7%
1890	633		−2.6%
1900	662		4.6%
1910	740		11.8%
1920	791		6.9%
1930	906		14.5%
1940	1,046		15.5%
1950	1,194		14.1%
1960	1,976		65.5%
1970	2,412		22.1%
1980	2,749		14.0%
1990	2,617		−4.8%
2000	4,478		71.1%
2010	7,101		58.6%
2020	9,107		28.2%
2025 (est.)	10,058		10.4%
US Census

=== 2020 census ===
As of the 2020 census, Canal Winchester had a population of 9,107. The median age was 41.6 years. 23.2% of residents were under the age of 18 and 19.5% of residents were 65 years of age or older. For every 100 females there were 89.5 males, and for every 100 females age 18 and over there were 86.0 males age 18 and over.

98.4% of residents lived in urban areas, while 1.6% lived in rural areas.

There were 3,410 households in Canal Winchester, of which 34.0% had children under the age of 18 living in them. Of all households, 57.1% were married-couple households, 11.7% were households with a male householder and no spouse or partner present, and 25.6% were households with a female householder and no spouse or partner present. About 24.7% of all households were made up of individuals and 15.0% had someone living alone who was 65 years of age or older.

There were 3,550 housing units, of which 3.9% were vacant. Among occupied housing units, 77.9% were owner-occupied and 22.1% were renter-occupied. The homeowner vacancy rate was 0.4% and the rental vacancy rate was 6.4%.

Racial composition as of the 2020 census
Race	Number	Percent
White	7,544	82.8%
Black or African American	774	8.5%
American Indian and Alaska Native	19	0.2%
Asian	143	1.6%
Native Hawaiian and Other Pacific Islander	2	<0.1%
Some other race	71	0.8%
Two or more races	554	6.1%
Hispanic or Latino (of any race)	238	2.6%

=== 2010 census ===
As of the census of 2010, there were 7,101 people, 2,646 households, and 1,924 families living in the village. The population density was 950.6 inhabitants per square mile (367.0/km^{2}). There were 2,893 housing units at an average density of 387.3 per square mile (149.5/km^{2}). The racial makeup of the village was 91.6% White, 5.1% African American, 0.1% Native American, 1.2% Asian, 0.4% from other races, and 1.6% from two or more races. Hispanic or Latino people of any race were 1.2% of the population.

There were 2,646 households, of which 37.6% had children under the age of 18 living with them, 59.7% were married couples living together, 9.2% had a female householder with no husband present, 3.8% had a male householder with no wife present, and 27.3% were non-families. 23.5% of all households were made up of individuals, and 11.8% had someone living alone who was 65 years of age or older. The average household size was 2.62 and the average family size was 3.11.

The median age in the village was 39.7 years. 26.7% of residents were under the age of 18; 6.5% were between the ages of 18 and 24; 25.3% were from 25 to 44; 26.9% were from 45 to 64; and 14.8% were 65 years of age or older. The gender makeup of the village was 47.2% male and 52.8% female.

=== 2000 census ===
As of the census of 2000, there were 4,478 people, 1,664 households, and 1,264 families living in the village. The population density was 702.9 inhabitants per square mile (271.4/km^{2}). There were 1,779 housing units at an average density of 279.2 per square mile (107.8/km^{2}). The racial makeup of the village was 95.60% White, 2.19% African American, 0.38% Native American, 0.67% Asian, 0.04% from other races, and 1.12% from two or more races. Hispanic or Latino people of any race were 0.51% of the population.

There were 1,664 households, out of which 37.3% had children under the age of 18 living with them, 65.6% were married couples living together, 7.6% had a female householder with no husband present, and 24.0% were non-families. 20.9% of all households were made up of individuals, and 9.8% had someone living alone who was 65 years of age or older. The average household size was 2.61 and the average family size was 3.04.

In the village the population was spread out, with 27.0% under the age of 18, 5.1% from 18 to 24, 30.2% from 25 to 44, 23.2% from 45 to 64, and 14.5% who were 65 years of age or older. The median age was 38 years. For every 100 females, there were 87.1 males. For every 100 females age 18 and over, there were 84.4 males.

The median income for a household in the village was $55,645, and the median income for a family was $67,833. Males had a median income of $39,123 versus $37,399 for females. The per capita income for the village was $24,394. About 1.2% of families and 2.2% of the population were below the poverty line, including 2.0% of those under age 18 and none of those age 65 or over.

== Culture ==
=== Festivals ===
Canal Winchester hosts a Labor Day Festival the first weekend of September. There are rides, musical entertainment, food, a beer tent and games. There is a parade on Monday, Labor Day. During the first weekend of August the town holds the Blues and Ribs Fest bringing blues artists and rib vendors from all over the country. The first weekend in December the city hosts Christmas in the Village, a Holiday themed festival with food, choirs, a gingerbread house contest, ice sculptors, family activities and horse-drawn buggy rides.

=== Landmarks ===
Highlights of the area include Historic Downtown Canal Winchester, The National Barber's Museum and National Barber Hall of Fame, Slate Run Vineyard and Winery, the US headquarters of Scottish brewing company BrewDog, the BrewDog beer hotel, and the many antique shops in the Village. Canal Winchester is also home to the Bergstresser Bridge, the only standing wooden covered bridge in Franklin County.

== Education ==
New elementary schools, a new wing of the high school, and a new middle school have all been built since 2000.

Canal Winchester High School's mascot is the Indians, and their colors are maroon and white. The high school offers many college prep and AP courses. The school is best known for its football, wrestling, basketball, cross country, cheerleading, track, and volleyball teams, all of which compete at the Division 1 level. The baseball team was back-to-back state runner-up from 2008 to 2009. In recent years the school has produced two Wendy's High School Heisman State Finalists, Greg Guiler and Andy Rhinehart; the award recognizes the state's best high school student athletes. The soccer team have seen success, with two district titles (2013, 2014), and one OCC Cardinal Division title (2014).

== Sister cities ==
- Bernay, Eure, France

== Notable people ==
- Byron Mullens, NBA player
- Oley Speaks, composer and songwriter
- Robert Warren, television painter
- Grace Marie Bareis, an American mathematician and educator who became the first person to receive a doctorate degree in mathematics from Ohio State University
