= Renick Farm (South Bloomfield, Ohio) =

Historic house in Ohio, United States

- U.S. National Register of Historic Places
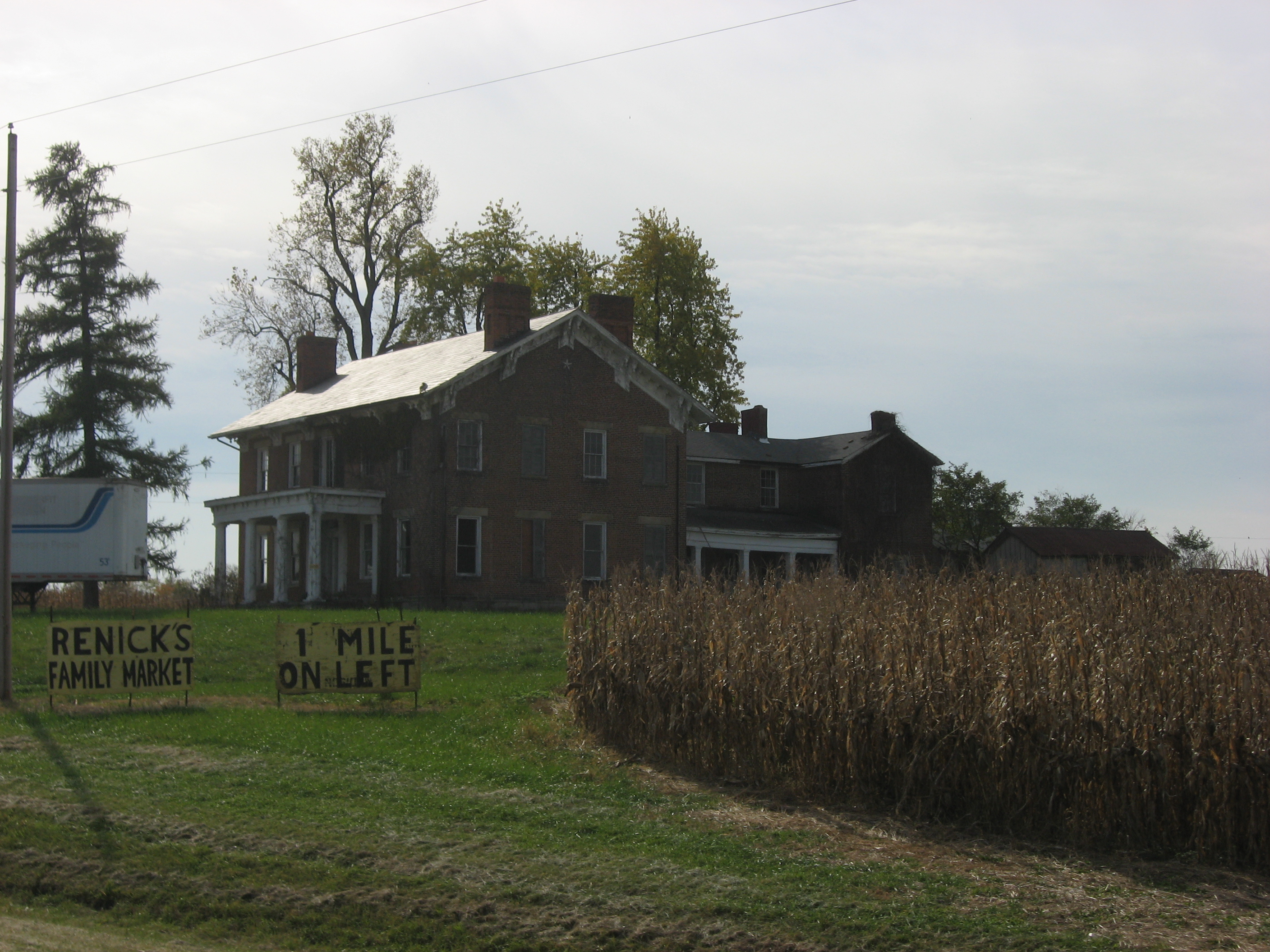
- Front and side of the Renick farmhouse

- Location within Ohio Location within the United States
- Nearest city: South Bloomfield, Ohio
- Coordinates: 39°45′1″N 82°59′28″W
- Area: 4 acres (1.6 ha)
- Built: 1830
- Architect: Edward Williams
- Architectural style: Greek Revival, Italianate
- NRHP reference No.: 82003631
- Added to NRHP: March 5, 1982

The Renick Farm is a historic farmstead located along U.S. Route 23 near the village of South Bloomfield in northern Pickaway County, Ohio, United States. Composed of six buildings dating back to 1830, the farmstead has been designated a historic site because of its unusually well-preserved architecture.

Farmer Edward Williams bought the land now occupied by the farm in 1820 and soon erected part of the present farmhouse. He owned the property until 1850, when he sold it to Joseph Renick, a member of a prominent Pickaway County family. Soon after taking possession, Renick expanded the house greatly; it reached twice its original size. Its brick walls rest on a stone foundation and are covered with a tin roof. Among its most distinctive architectural elements are two spiral staircases, an ornate cornice with distinctive brackets, and a prominent entryway. Together, these elements combine to form a mix of the Greek Revival and Italianate architectural styles.

Except for the period between 1918 and 1977, the farm has remained in Renick family ownership since 1850. It has been remarkably well preserved since its construction, being seen by architectural historians as one of Pickaway County's best examples of rural nineteenth-century architecture. Because of its distinctive architecture, the farm was listed on the National Register of Historic Places in 1982; the landmarked area includes the farmhouse and five other buildings spread out over an area of 4 acres (1.6 ha).

The main farmhouse was torn down on October 11, 2016.
