= Brice, Ohio =

- Village
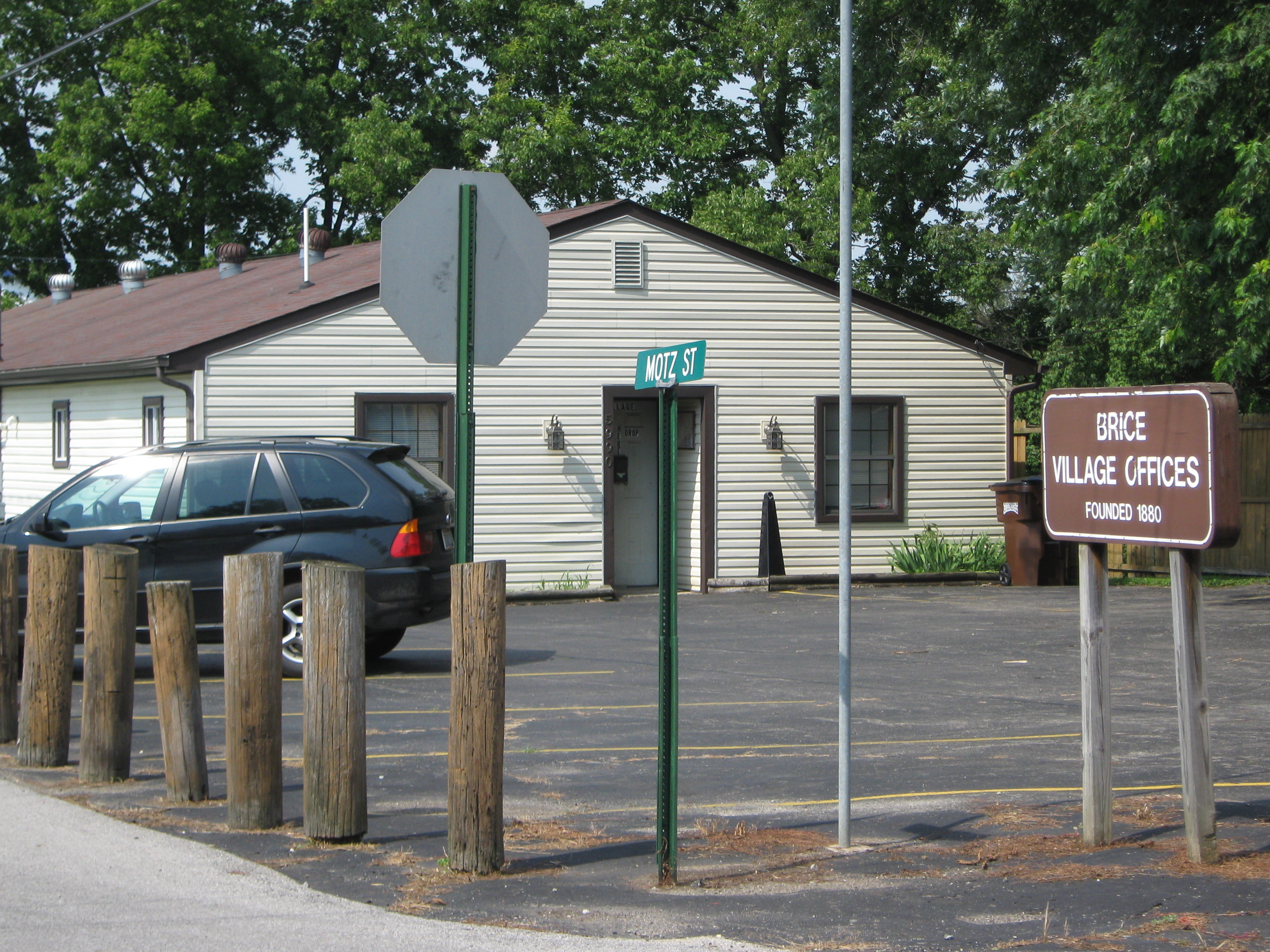
- Brice village offices
- Motto: "An Early American Village"
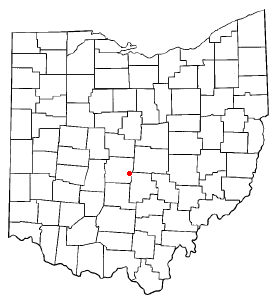
- Location of Brice within Ohio

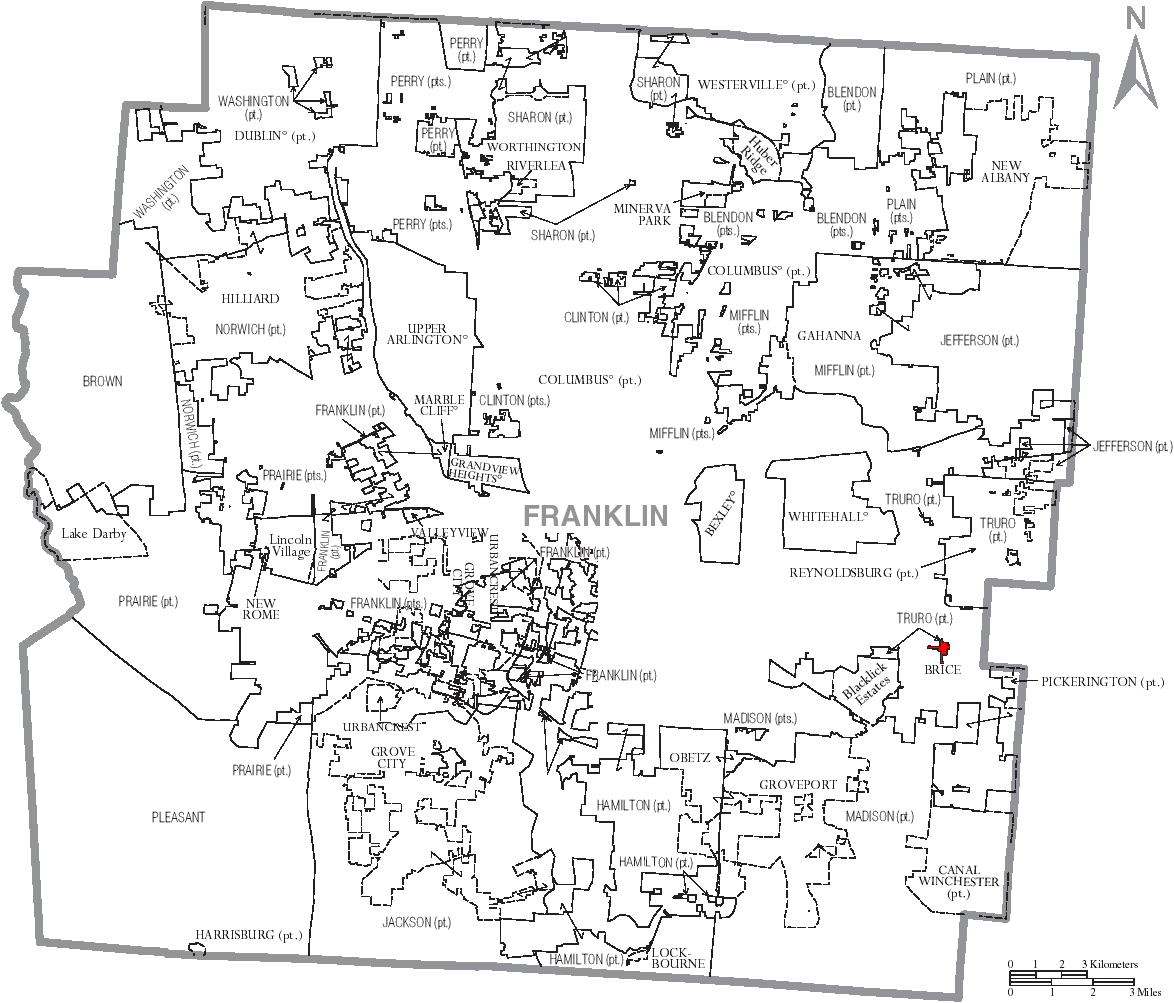
- Location of Brice within Franklin County
- Coordinates: 39°55′03″N 82°49′55″W
- Country: United States
- State: Ohio
- County: Franklin

Area
  - Total: 0.089 sq mi (0.23 km^{2})
  - Land: 0.089 sq mi (0.23 km^{2})
  - Water: 0 sq mi (0.00 km^{2})
- Elevation: 781 ft (238 m)

Population (2020)
  - Total: 93
  - Estimate (2023): 91
  - Density: 1,062.0/sq mi (410.05/km^{2})
- Time zone: UTC-5 (Eastern (EST))
  - Summer (DST): UTC-4 (EDT)
- ZIP code: 43109
- Area code: 614
- FIPS code: 39-08532
- GNIS feature ID: 2397451
- Website: www.briceohio.com

Brice is a village in Franklin County, Ohio, United States, on the southeast side of the Columbus metropolitan area. The population was 93 at the 2020 census.

The village has been deemed a speed trap by state officials.

== Geography ==
According to the United States Census Bureau, the village has a total area of 0.10 square miles (0.26 km^{2}), all land.

== Demographics ==
Historical population
Census	Pop.	Note	%±
1970	228		—
1980	93		−59.2%
1990	109		17.2%
2000	70		−35.8%
2010	114		62.9%
2020	93		−18.4%
2023 (est.)	91	▼	−2.2%
U.S. Decennial Census

=== 2010 census ===
At the 2010 census there were 114 people, 41 households, and 27 families living in the village. The population density was 1,140.0 inhabitants per square mile (440.2/km^{2}). There were 44 housing units at an average density of 440.0 per square mile (169.9/km^{2}). The racial makeup of the village was 78.1% White, 10.5% African American, 1.8% Asian, 0.9% Pacific Islander, 0.9% from other races, and 7.9% from two or more races. Of the 41 households 36.6% had children under the age of 18 living with them, 43.9% were married couples living together, 14.6% had a female householder with no husband present, 7.3% had a male householder with no wife present, and 34.1% were non-families. 26.8% of households were one person and 7.3% were one person aged 65 or older. The average household size was 2.78 and the average family size was 3.26.

The median age in the village was 40 years. 26.3% of residents were under the age of 18; 4.3% were between the ages of 18 and 24; 25.4% were from 25 to 44; 31.6% were from 45 to 64; and 12.3% were 65 or older. The gender makeup of the village was 48.2% male and 51.8% female.

=== 2000 census ===
At the 2000 census there were 70 people, 25 households, and 17 families living in the village. The population density was 909.9 inhabitants per square mile (351.3/km^{2}). There were 27 housing units at an average density of 350.9 per square mile (135.5/km^{2}). The racial makeup of the village was 97.14% White, 1.43% Native American, and 1.43% from two or more races. Of the 25 households 48.0% had children under the age of 18 living with them, 60.0% were married couples living together, 4.0% had a female householder with no husband present, and 32.0% were non-families. 28.0% of households were one person and 8.0% were one person aged 65 or older. The average household size was 2.80 and the average family size was 3.59.

The age distribution was 32.9% under the age of 18, 10.0% from 18 to 24, 28.6% from 25 to 44, 20.0% from 45 to 64, and 8.6% 65 or older. The median age was 30 years. For every 100 females there were 100.0 males. For every 100 females age 18 and over, there were 80.8 males.

The median household income was $34,375 and the median family income was $34,375. Males had a median income of $41,250 versus $41,250 for females. The per capita income for the village was $18,651. None of the population and none of the families were below the poverty line.

== Government ==
The majority of the village's revenues in 2019 and 2020 were in fines collected with traffic enforcement cameras. Ohio Auditor of State Keith Faber characterized the village as a "speed trap" with "no other reason for it to exist." The speed camera program was suspended in 2021. It resumed operation in 2024.
