= Robtown, Ohio =

- Unincorporated community
- Nickname: Bobtown
- Interactive map of Robtown, Ohio
- Coordinates: 39°43′01″N 83°03′36″W
- Country: United States
- State: Ohio
- County: Pickaway
- Settled: 1822

Government
  - Type: None
  - Founder: Michael Robison
  - co-Founder: Issac Robison
- Elevation: 787 ft (240 m)
- Time zone: UTC-5 (Eastern (EST))
  - Summer (DST): UTC-4 (EDT)
- ZIP code: 43103
- Area code: 740–220
- GNIS feature ID: 1061617

Robtown is an unincorporated community in Pickaway County, in the U.S. state of Ohio. The area is located approximately five miles west of South Bloomfield, Ohio and three miles northeast of Darbyville, Ohio, on the banks of Grave Run, a tributary of the Scioto River, and at the crossroads of Ohio State Route 316 and Turney Caldwell Road.

== History ==
In 1822, Michael Robison moved his family from Pike County, Ohio, to southern Scioto Township where he bought 250 acres and raised 15 children. He died in 1851, and five of his children, Sarah Hall, Matilda Hott, Almira Hott, Ann Hoover, and Issac Robison continued living in what they named Robtown. The Hott family moved into the main farm house located on Route 316.

A post office called Robtown was established on May 16, 1864, before being closed on January 25, 1871, and being reestablished on July 14, 1900, and remained in operation until January 31, 1902. Besides the post office, Robtown had two country stores and the Hott Family Cemetery.

== Places of Interest ==
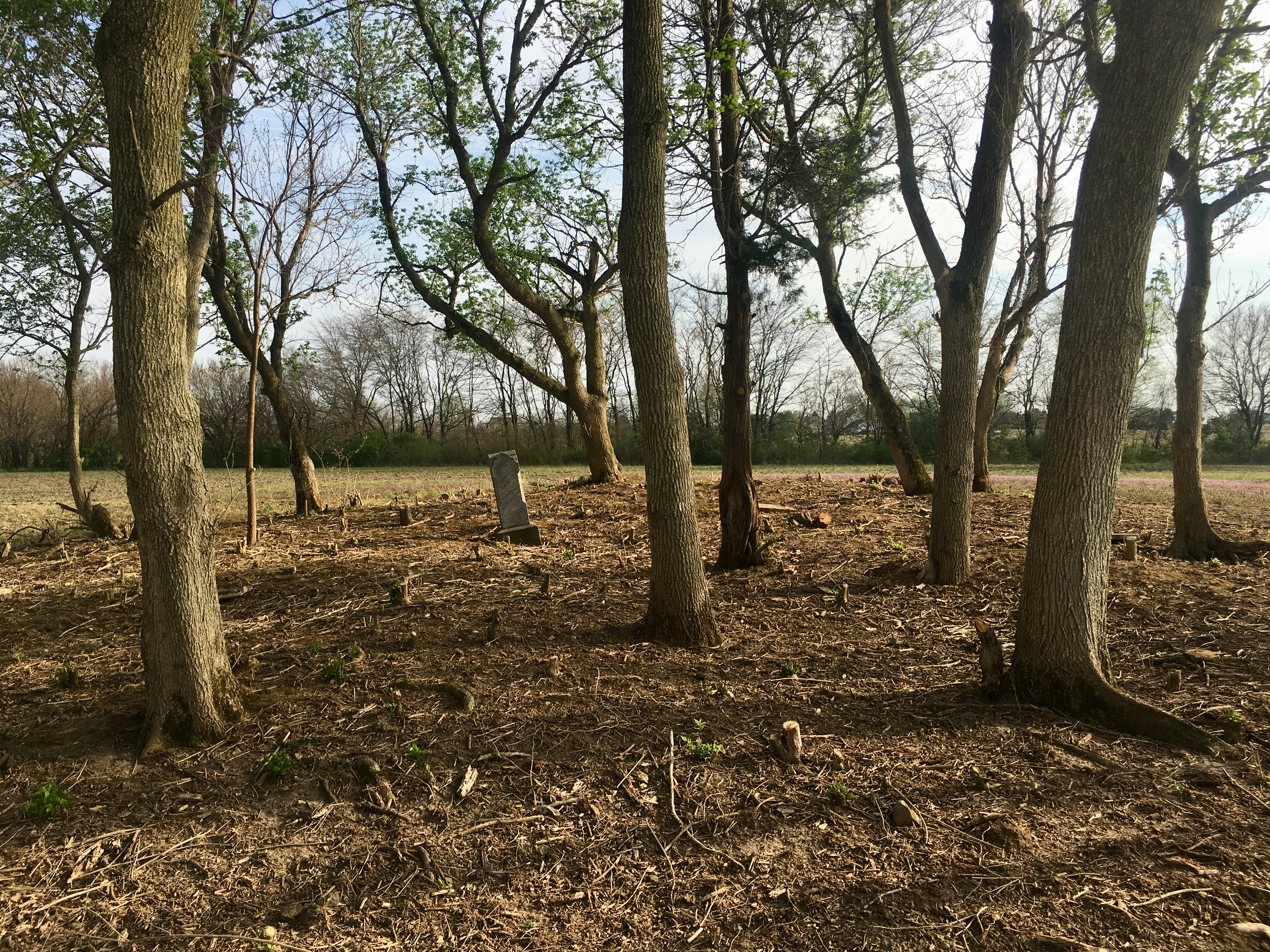
George Hott Farm Cemetery

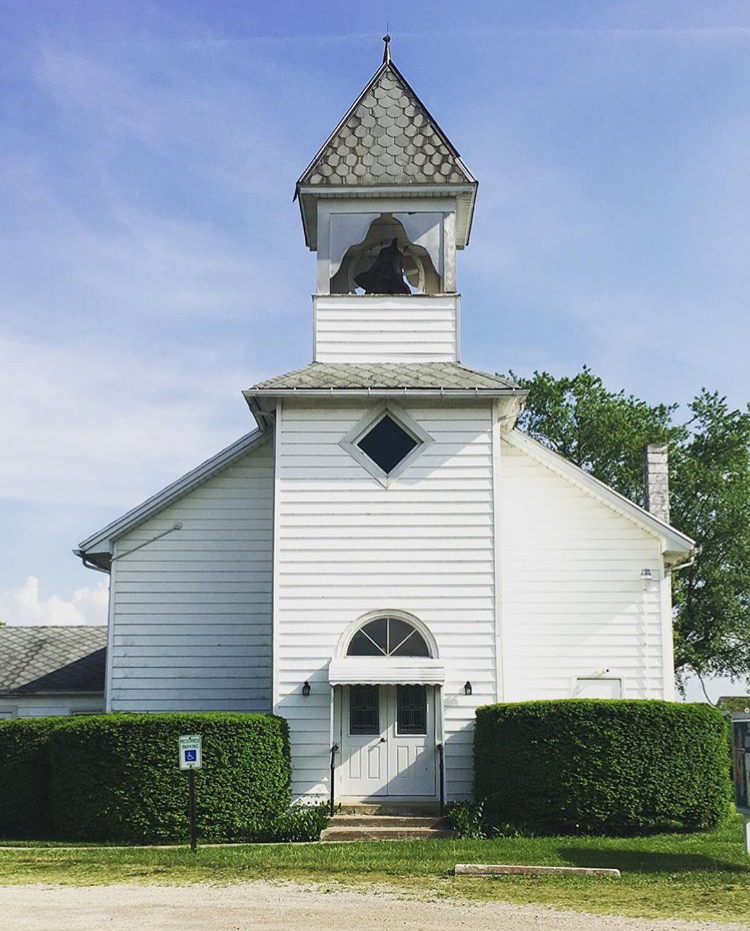
Scioto Chapel

=== Hott Farm ===
The Hott Farm is located on Ohio Route 316. The farm currently consists of a brick farmhouse and two barns.

=== George Hott Farm Cemetery ===
As part of the Hott Farm, a family cemetery was established off of Messmore Road. The cemetery has six identifiable markers. In 2019, the cemetery was brought out of disrepair and the first burial in 144 years took place.

- Elizabeth Robison (d. 1849)
- Annie Robison (d. 1849)
- Zachariah McLain (d. 1855)
- Issac Robison (d. 1875)
- unknown
- unknown
- Johann "John" Hartig (d. 2019)

=== Scioto Chapel ===
The church was organized in the community around 1843 by the United Brethren In Christ (E.U.B.) in a log school house. In 1875, a frame structure was constructed and the church was renamed Scioto Chapel. In 1968, the E.U.B. merged with the Methodist Church to form the United Methodist Church, thus the church became United Methodist.

After more than 50 years of being affiliated with the United Methodist Church, the congregation voted to leave the denomination to join the Global Methodist Church on January 1, 2023, as a result of a schism between the UMC and several more traditional congregations.

Scioto Chapel has a reported congregation of 30 people.
