= Ohio State Route 762 =

State highway in Pickaway County, Ohio, US

State Route 762

Route information
- Maintained by ODOT
- Length: 14.89 mi (23.96 km)
- Existed: 1938–present

Major junctions
- West end: US 62 / SR 3 / CR 20 in Harrisburg
- US 23 near Lockbourne
- East end: CR 385 (Rickenbacker Parkway) near Lockbourne

Location
- Country: United States
- State: Ohio
- Counties: Pickaway

Highway system
- Ohio State Highway System; Interstate; US; State; Scenic
← SR 761	→ SR 763

State Route 762 (SR 762) is an east–west state highway in central Ohio, a U.S. state. The highway has its western terminus at a signalized intersection with the concurrency of U.S. Route 62 and SR 3 just 0.25 miles (0.40 km) south of the village limits of Harrisburg. SR 762's eastern terminus is at an intersection of Pickaway County Route 385 (Rickenbacker Parkway) near the Rickenbacker International Airport.

== Route description ==
SR 762 is located in the northern portion of Pickaway County passing through the towns of Orient and Commercial Point. Throughout the highway's length, it passes just to the south of the Franklin County line. SR 762 begins at a signalized intersection with US 62 / SR 3 to the south of Harrisburg in Darby Township; to the north, the road continues as Pickaway County Route 20. SR 762 heads south for about 0.3 miles (0.48 km) before it makes a left turn to cross the Big Darby Creek where it enters Scioto Township. After passing an entrance road to the Pickaway Correctional Institution, the route crosses under an Indiana and Ohio Railway overpass and enters the town of Orient skirting the town's southern border throughout its entire length in Orient. After passing another sector of the prison, SR 762 heads east through mostly farmland. Upon entering the town of Commercial Point, SR 762 heads due south through it on Main Street.

At a skewed intersection with Scioto Street, SR 762 makes a left turn onto it and exits the town. After passing through more farmland, the road comes to a signalized intersection with SR 104. SR 762 continues east over the Scioto River and enters Harrison Township. After passing through a forest-entwined section of farmland, the road comes to an intersection with US 23. SR 762 continues east on a slightly realigned former township road to the south of the community of Duvall passing over CSX and Norfolk Southern rail lines on a new overpass. Just after the overpass, SR 762 makes a left turn at Duvall Road and Ashville Pike. The state route heads due north past the Rickenbacker Intermodal Facility before ending at Rickenbacker Parkway (CR 385) at the southern edge of the Rickenbacker International Airport.

No section of the original highway is included as a part of the National Highway System but the extension of SR 762 east of US 23 is designated an Intermodal Connector.

== History ==
The SR 762 designation occurred in 1937. It was established on the same alignment through northern Pickaway County between US 62/SR 3 and US 23 that it utilized throughout most of its history. No changes of major significance had taken place to the routing of SR 762 since it was created until its eastward extension.

In 2015, SR 762 was extended east and northward for 3.7 miles (6.0 km) as a part of Pickaway County East West Connector project to connect major roads to the Rickenbacker Intermodal Facility. The project began construction in 2013 with funding from a $16 million Transportation Investment Generating Economic Recovery Federal grant. Construction on a three-lane realignment of Duvall Road including the bypass of at-grade railroad crossings was completed in May 2015. A roundabout at the intersection with Duvall Road and Ashville Pike was constructed in 2024. Future improvements include an additional roundabout at the intersection with Rickenbacker Parkway and a diamond interchange with US 23.

== Major intersections ==
The entire route is in Pickaway County.

Location	mi	km	Destinations	Notes
Darby Township	0.00	0.00	US 62 / SR 3 / CR 20 – Columbus, Mount Sterling, Harrisburg	
Scioto Township	9.20	14.81	SR 104 – Columbus, Chillicothe	
Harrison Township	11.18	17.99	US 23 – Circleville, Columbus	
Harrison Township	14.89	23.96	CR 385 (Rickenbacker Parkway)	
1.000 mi = 1.609 km; 1.000 km = 0.621 mi
