= Matville =

Matville may refer to:

- Matville, Ohio, an unincorporated community in Pickaway County
- Matville, West Virginia, an unincorporated community in Raleigh County
