= Millport, Pickaway County, Ohio =

Unincorporated community in Ohio, U.S.

Coordinates: 39°42′56″N 82°58′23″W

Millport was an unincorporated community in Pickaway County, in the U.S. state of Ohio. The community is located between Ashville, Ohio, and South Bloomfield, Ohio, on Ohio State Route 316. As of 2019, the Millport has approximately 50 homes and has been incorporated into the Village of South Bloomfield.

== History ==
Millport was laid out and platted in 1837. A mill operated there and the community was a shipping port on the Ohio Canal.
