= W. C. Clemmons Mound =

Archaeological site in Ohio, United States

- U.S. National Register of Historic Places
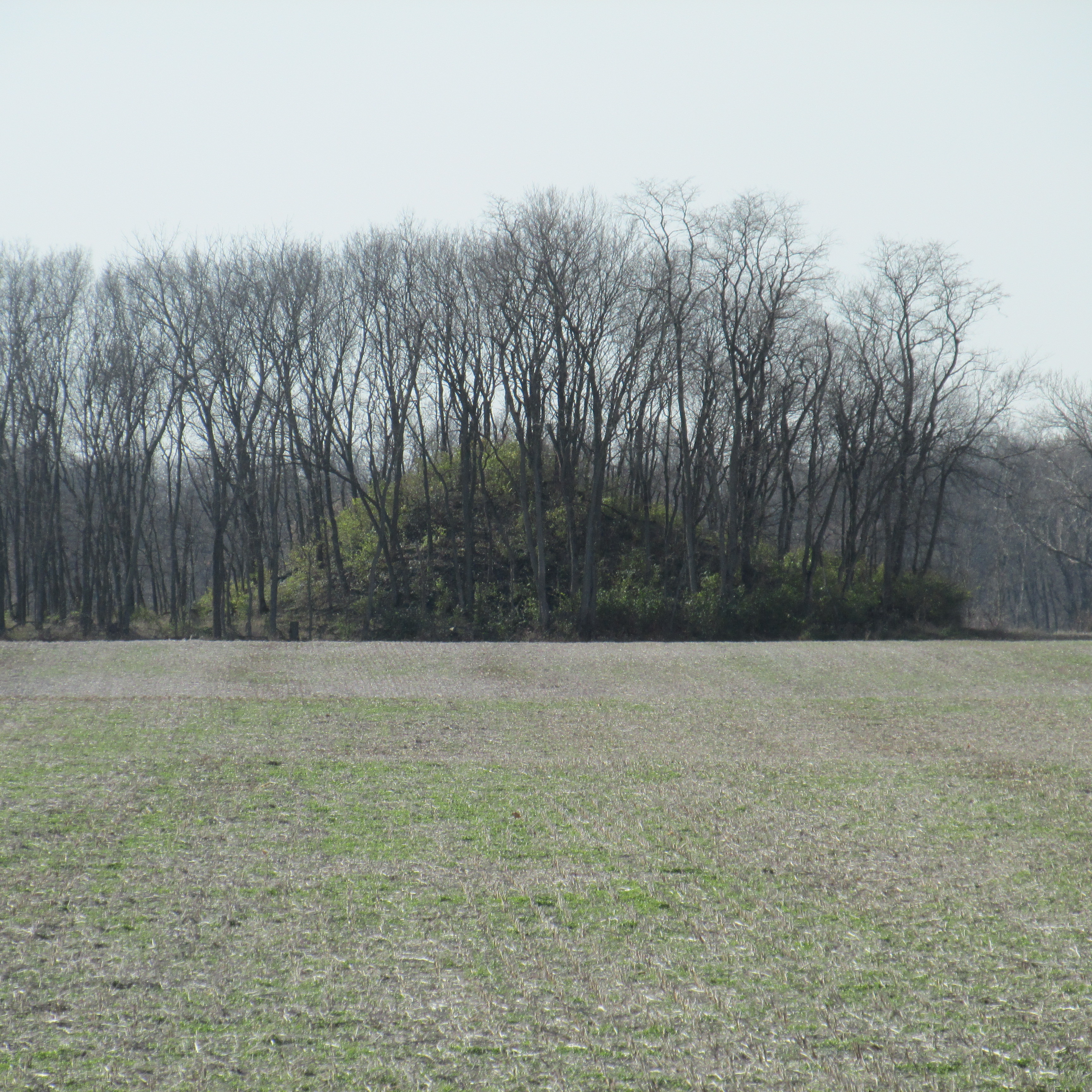
- Roadside view of the mound

- Location within Ohio Location within the United States
- Location: Southern side of Florence Chapel Pike, northwest of Fox
- Coordinates: 39°38′57″N 83°1′44″W
- Area: 3 acres (1.2 ha)
- NRHP reference No.: 74001594
- Added to NRHP: May 2, 1974

The W. C. Clemmons Mound is a Native American mound in the south central portion of the U.S. state of Ohio. Located near the unincorporated community of Fox, it lies in the middle of a farm field near a creek. A cone measuring approximately 22 feet (6.7 m) high and 144 feet (44 m) in diameter, its shape is almost exactly circular.

The mound is significant as a potential archaeological site. Although it has never been excavated, its location has led archaeologists to conclude that it was built by people of the Adena culture, who constructed many burial mounds for their leaders; typical Adena mounds contain log tombs that house the bodies of high-ranking members of society along with plentiful grave goods. Because the mound has never been excavated, it is exceedingly well preserved; perhaps no other mound in Pickaway County has been so little changed since the region was settled.

In 1974, the Clemmons mound was listed on the National Register of Historic Places, due to its archaeological value.
