= Dorothy Adkins =

American psychologist (1912–1975)

- Born: Dorothy Christina Adkins; April 6, 1912; Atlanta, Ohio, United States
- Died: December 19, 1975 (aged 63); Plain City, Ohio, United States
- Education: Ohio State University (BS, PhD)
- Occupation: Psychologist
- Known for: First female president of the Psychometric Society

Dorothy Christina Adkins (April 6, 1912 – December 19, 1975) was an American psychologist. Adkins is best known for her work in psychometrics and education testing, particularly in achievement testing. She was the first female president of the Psychometric Society and served in several roles in the American Psychological Association.

== Early life ==
Adkins was born on April 6, 1912, in Atlanta, a town in Pickaway County, Ohio, United States. Adkins father, George Hoadley Adkins, worked as a businessman as well as a farmer and her mother, Peal F. James-Adkins worked as a teacher at a local school. Dorothy was the couple's third child.

== Education ==
She attended public school in Atlanta until graduation in 1927. Growing up, Adkins developed a love of music, which led her to later study violin at the Cincinnati Conservatory of Music. After only one year at the Conservatory, she quit to pursue a degree in mathematics from Ohio State University. Her interest in mathematics quickly drew her to statistics and psychometrics, and she took up psychology. Adkins received a Bachelor of Science (1931) and PhD (1937) in mathematics and psychology from Ohio State.

Her PhD was completed under the advisement of Herbert Toops. Toops was a student of Edward Lee Thorndike for psychology and Truman Kelly for statistics. Adkins competed her PhD in 1937 under the title “A Comparative Study of Methods of Selecting Test Items”. While completing her PhD Adkins began working as a psychometrics assistant examiner under Louis Leon Thurstone at the University of Chicago. Upon completion of her PhD she was eventually promoted to research associate in 1938. During her time at the University of Chicago she was exposed to test development.

== Career ==
=== U.S. Government ===
Adkins' time as a psychometrics assistant examiner at the University of Chicago and research experience made her a desirable job candidate upon her graduation. In 1940 she was offered a position with the United States government, working as an assistant chief of Research and Test Development for the United States Social Security Board in Washington, D.C. She would later be promoted to the chief of this department. Adkins also worked as Chief of Social Sciences and Administrative Testing and the Chief of Test Development for the U.S. Civil Service Commission while in D.C. from 1940 to 1948. During this time, she received special assignments from the government to the Virgin Islands, Puerto Rico, Georgia, and Thailand. It would be almost a decade before Adkins returned to academia.

=== University of North Carolina Chapel Hill ===
In 1948 Adkins accepted a faculty position at the University of North Carolina Chapel Hill. After only two years at the university, she was promoted to chairman of the department of psychology. Adkins held this position until 1961, and for 11 of those years she was the only female department chair at the university. During this time at the University of North Carolina Adkins served as the Merit System Supervisor for the North Carolina Merit System and was a consultant to the NCMS and the North Carolina State Personnel Board from 1956 to 1959. It was also during this time that she wrote one of her most well known books: Test Construction: Development and Interpretation of Achievement Tests (1960).

=== Psychometric Society ===
Adkins was the first female president of the Psychometric Society, serving from 1949 to 1950. The first president of the Psychometric Society was Adkins research advisor at the University of Chicago, L.L. Thurstone, who served from 1935 to 1936. Since the society's founding in 1935, there have only been five female presidents. Following Adkins, there was a 46-year gap before another woman would be appointed that role (Fumiko Samejima 1996). Adkins also served as the managing editor for Psychometrika, the Psychometric Society's publication, from 1950 to 1956. After these assignments ended, she continued to serve as a member of the board of trustees as well as a representative on the Inner-Association Council on Test Reviewing for the Psychometric Society from 1969 to 1972.

=== University of Hawaii ===
On the way back from a trip in 1968, Adkins stopped in Hawaii to visit friends and fell in love with the Islands. When she was given the opportunity to teach and research at the University of Hawaii in Educational Psychology, she accepted. While at the University of Hawaii, Adkins was made director of the Center for Research in Early Childhood Education. She was only able to stay in Hawaii until 1974, at which time complicated and ongoing medical conditions forced her to return home to the mainland U.S.

=== Professional organizations ===
- Psychometric Society: President (1949–1950)
- Psychometric Society: Board of Trustees (1969–1972)
- Psychometric Society: Representative on the Inner-Association Council on Test Reviewing (1969–1972)
- American Psychological Association: President of the Division of Evaluation and Measurement (1952–1953)
- American Psychological Association: Secretary-Treasurer of the Division of Evaluation and Measurement (1949–1951)
- American Psychological Association: Recording Secretary (1949–1951)
- American Psychological Association: Member of the Board of Directors (1949–1951)
- North Carolina Psychological Association: President (1951–1952)

== Contributions to psychology and education testing ==
=== Gumpgookies ===
Gumpgookies was a method of assessing child motivation to achieve in school, which Adkins created along with Bonnie Baliff. In this method, a child had to choose which of two imaginary Gumpgookie characters he or she identified with. [3] A child choosing one character over another indicated different levels of motivation. This method was used in the Head Start program evaluation in 1968–1969.

=== Educational testing ===
Over the course of her career, Adkins because interested in new (at the time) statistical techniques of factor analysis. She applied factor analytic techniques in order to examine and better understand curriculum, program evaluation, and affect in children. She published several books examining measurement and analysis in education and achievement tests.

Evidence of Adkins influence on the field of achievement testing can be seen in the years surrounding the publication of her 1947 book Construction and Analysis of Achievement Tests. In the first 10 years after publication this book was cited 55 times, with a total of 152 citations, the most recent citation in 2014. Google Ngram can be used to view the number of times the phrase “education testing” was used in books in the 20 years prior to and after the publication of Adkins book. Prior to the publication there was a slight decline in the used of the phrase, however after its publication, there was a steady increase in use of the phrase. Following the same trend (but to a lesser degree) the same post publication trend can be seen with a search of “Dorothy Adkins” name.

=== Selected works ===
- Adkins, D. C. (1947). Construction and analysis of achievement tests. Oxford, England: U. S. Government Printing Office, Oxford.
- Adkins, D. C. (1958). Measurement in relation to the educational process. Educational and Psychological Measurement, 18, 221–240.
- Adkins, D. C. (1973). A simpler structure of the American psychological association. American Psychologist, 28(1), 47–54.
- Adkins, D. C., & Kuder, G. F. (1940). The relation of primary mental abilities to activity preferences. Psychometrika, 5(4), 251–262.
- Adkins, D. C., Payne, F. D., & Ballif, B. L. (1972). Motivation factor scores and response set scores for ten ethnic-cultural groups of preschool children. American Educational Research Journal, 9(4), 557–572.
- Flanagan, J. C., Adkins, D., & Cadwell, D. H. B. (1950). Major developments in examining methods. (PAR no. 504.) (mimeo.). Oxford, England: Civil Service Assembly, Oxford

A full list of her papers are held by the Archives of the History of American Psychology at the University of Akron.

== Personal life ==
While at the University of North Carolina, Adkins was again colleagues with L.L Thurstone. She became dear friends with Thurstone and his wife, Thelma Thurstone, a friendship that lasted many years. Adkins was highly regarded by her students and colleges. She was known as a precise, dedicated, and excellent teacher, never unprepared for a lecture or meeting. To her friends, Adkins was known as compassionate, though she was always busy. She was known to take time to cook homemade meals/desserts or pick flowers from her garden to bring to friends who were ill. Adkins enjoyed travel, concerts, parties and games. She had two Weimaraner dogs that she loved dearly. In June 1974 Adkins retired from University of Hawaii to Plain City, Ohio, for medical reasons. She eventually wanted to return to teaching at Chapel Hill, but her health never permitted. On December 19, 1975, Dorothy Adkins died in her home near her family. In 1976 Thelma Thurstone wrote a biography/memoir for Adkins, which was published in Psychometrika.
