= Heathergreen, Ohio =

Unincorporated community in Ohio, U.S.

Coordinates: 39°36′10″N 82°54′22″W

Heathergreen is an unincorporated community in Pickaway County, in the U.S. state of Ohio.
