= Kinderhook =

Kinderhook may refer to:

== Places in the United States ==
- Kinderhook, Illinois
- Kinderhook (town), New York
  - Kinderhook (village), New York, in the above town
- Kinderhook, Ohio
- Kinderhook Creek, a tributary of the Hudson River, New York
- Kinderhook Township, Pike County, Illinois
- Kinderhook Township, Michigan, in Branch County

== Other ==
- Kinderhook Industries, American private equity firm
- Kinderhook plates, a hoax perpetrated on 19th century Mormons
- "Old Kinderhook", a name applied to U.S. President Martin Van Buren
