= Woodlyn =

Woodlyn may refer to:

- Woodlyn, Ohio
- Woodlyn, Pennsylvania

== See also ==
- Woodlynne, New Jersey
