= Muhlenberg Township =

Muhlenberg Township is the name of two townships in the United States:

- Muhlenberg Township, Pickaway County, Ohio
- Muhlenberg Township, Berks County, Pennsylvania
