= Pickaway-Ross Career & Technology Center =

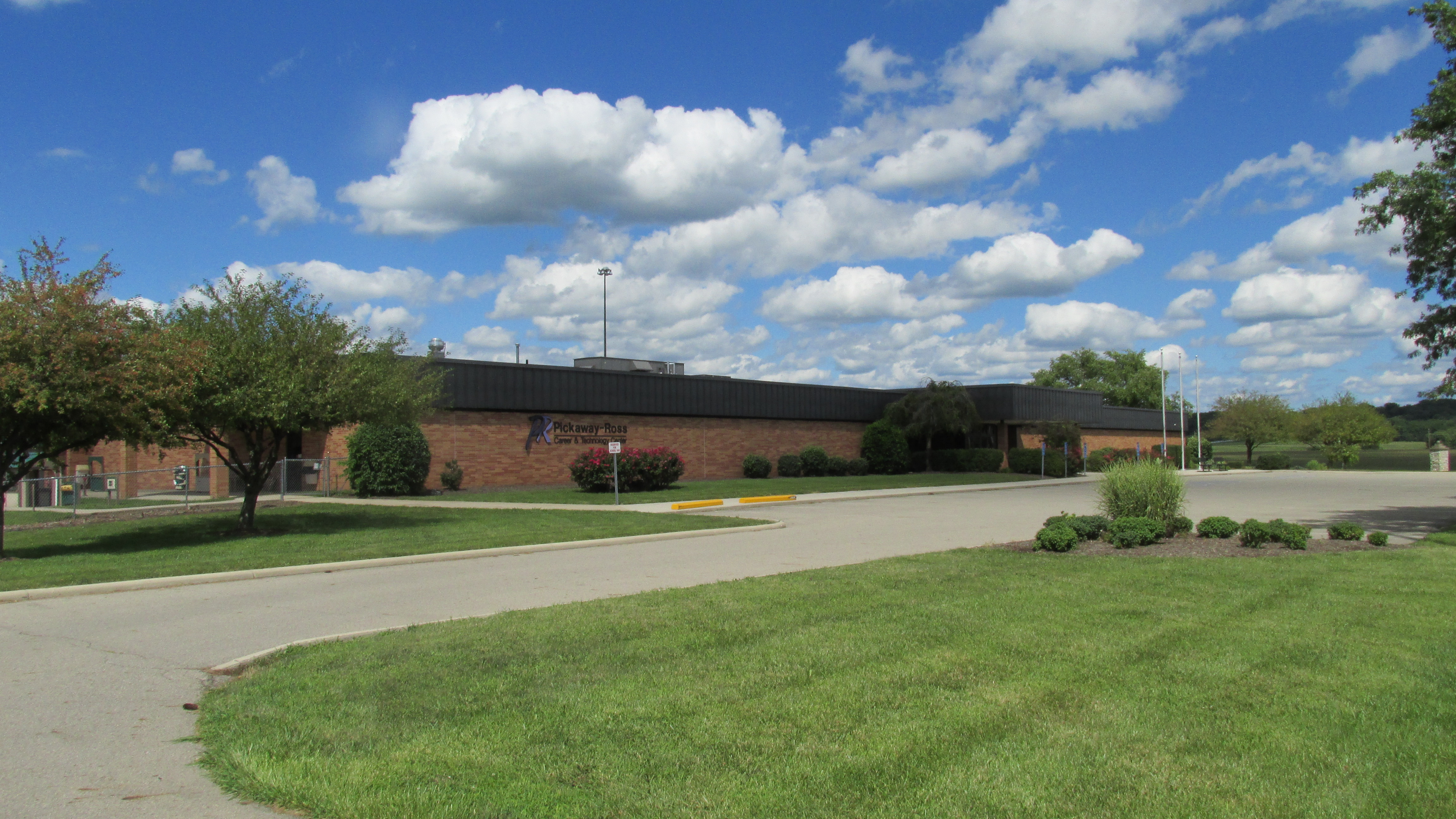

Location
- 895 Crouse Chapel Road; Chillicothe, Ohio; United States
- Coordinates: 39°26′24″N 82°57′41″W

Information
- Type: public, rural, high school
- Established: 1974
- School district: Pickaway-Ross County Joint Vocational School District
- Grades: 11–12
- Website: District Website

Pickaway-Ross Career & Technology Center (colloquially called Pickaway-Ross) is a vocational-technical school serving Pickaway and Ross counties in Ohio. The school is located north of Chillicothe, Ohio and is governed by the Pickaway-Ross County Joint Vocational School District.

Founded in 1974, Pickaway-Ross offers 20 high school tech-prep programs to students from 10 high schools in Ross and Pickaway counties. High school students attend Pickaway-Ross their junior and senior years, and can earn a Career Passport in addition to a diploma from their home schools. Six hundred students attend Pickaway-Ross's main campus, and another 1,500 students attend off-campus (or satellite) programs housed in affiliated high schools.

School districts affiliated with Pickaway-Ross include: Adena, Chillicothe, Huntington, Paint Valley, Southeastern, Unioto, and Zane Trace in Ross County, and Circleville, Logan Elm and Westfall in Pickaway County.

Pickaway-Ross also has an Adult Education Division, providing programs in skilled trades, public safety, medical services fields and others. That division also provides training and consulting services to local businesses and industries.
