= Ohio State Route 752 =

State highway in Pickaway County, Ohio, US

State Route 752

Route information
- Maintained by ODOT
- Length: 8.43 mi (13.57 km)
- Existed: 1937–present

Major junctions
- West end: US 23 in South Bloomfield
- East end: SR 674 near Ashville

Location
- Country: United States
- State: Ohio
- Counties: Pickaway

Highway system
- Ohio State Highway System; Interstate; US; State; Scenic
← SR 751	→ SR 753

State Route 752 (SR 752) is an east–west state highway in the south-central portion of Ohio. The western terminus of SR 752 is at a signalized T-intersection with US 23 on the north edge of South Bloomfield, and its eastern terminus is at SR 674 about 7 miles (11 km) east of Ashville on the Pickaway-Fairfield County Line.

SR 752 was created in the late 1930s. This two-lane state highway, which runs through the northeastern portion of Pickaway County, is becoming more highly traveled in recent years, as subdivisions are being constructed at a rapid rate in the Teays Valley Local School District.

== Route description ==
The entirety of SR 752 is located in the northeastern quadrant of Pickaway County. No portion of the highway is included as a part of the National Highway System.

== History ==
SR 752 was designated in 1937, following the alignment that it occupies to this day. No changes of major significance have taken place to this state route since its inception.

== Major intersections ==
County	Location	mi	km	Destinations	Notes
Pickaway	South Bloomfield	0.00	0.00	US 23	
Pickaway	Ashville	1.82	2.93	SR 316 west / CR 28 (Ashville Pike)	Eastern terminus of SR 316
Pickaway–Fairfield county line	Walnut–Amanda township line	8.43	13.57	SR 674 / Royalton Road	
1.000 mi = 1.609 km; 1.000 km = 0.621 mi
