= Thacher, Ohio =

Unincorporated community in Ohio, U.S.

Coordinates: 39°33′49″N 82°53′03″W

Thacher is an unincorporated community in Pickaway County, in the U.S. state of Ohio.

== History ==
A former variant name was Thatcher. A post office called Thatcher was established in 1886, and remained in operation until 1902. Thatcher was the name of a local blacksmith.
