= Westfall, Ohio =

Unincorporated community in Ohio, U.S.

Coordinates: 39°33′29″N 82°59′57″W

Westfall is an unincorporated community in Pickaway County, in the U.S. state of Ohio. There is no relationship between the community and with Westfall High School, despite it having the same name. Some nearby rivers and creeks/ponds are the Scioto River and Hitler Pond. It is off of Ohio State Route 104.

== History ==
Westfall was named for Abel Westfall, the first settler in the area. Westfall was considered a potential rival to Chillicothe, but the site was "unhealthy" and the town quickly disappeared.
