= Saint Paul, Ohio =

Unincorporated community in Ohio, U.S.

Coordinates: 39°44′50″N 82°54′46″W

Saint Paul is an unincorporated community in Pickaway County, in the U.S. state of Ohio.

== History ==
A post office was established at Saint Paul in 1861, and remained in operation until 1902. The reverend from the local St. Paul's Evangelical Lutheran Church was the first postmaster.
