= Hayesville, Pickaway County, Ohio =

Unincorporated community in Ohio, U.S.

Coordinates: 39°32′13″N 82°55′58″W

Hayesville is an unincorporated community in Pickaway County, in the U.S. state of Ohio.

== History ==
A post office called Hayesville Station was in operation from 1878 until 1879. Hayesville had two stores, a blacksmith shop, and grain elevator.
