= East Ringgold, Ohio =

Unincorporated community in Ohio, U.S.

Coordinates: 39°40′10″N 82°51′40″W

East Ringgold is an unincorporated community in Pickaway County, in the U.S. state of Ohio.

== History ==
The first settlement at East Ringgold (originally called Grand View) was made in the 1830s. The town had a wagon-making shop and a sawmill, and a post office from 1855 to 1906. Near East Ringgold, three mounds from the "Mound Builders" (the Adena Culture) can be found.
