= Pherson, Ohio =

Unincorporated community in Ohio, U.S.

Coordinates: 39°39′21″N 83°07′11″W

Pherson is an unincorporated community in Pickaway County, in the U.S. state of Ohio.

== History ==
A post office was established at Pherson in 1887, and remained in operation until 1910. Isaac A. Pherson, the first postmaster, gave the community his name.
