= Era, Ohio =

Unincorporated community in Ohio, U.S.

Coordinates: 39°44′28″N 83°14′26″W

Era is an unincorporated community in Pickaway County, in the U.S. state of Ohio.

== History ==
Era was originally called Palestine, and under the latter name was laid out in 1829. A post office called Palestine was established in 1833, the name was changed to Era in 1899, and the post office closed in 1913.
