= Ohio State Route 316 =

State highway in Pickaway County, Ohio, US

State Route 316

Route information
- Maintained by ODOT
- Length: 14.05 mi (22.61 km)
- Existed: 1931–present

Major junctions
- West end: SR 56 / CR 21 in Monroe Township
- US 23 in South Bloomfield
- East end: SR 752 / CR 28 in Ashville

Location
- Country: United States
- State: Ohio
- Counties: Pickaway

Highway system
- Ohio State Highway System; Interstate; US; State; Scenic
← SR 315	→ SR 317

State Route 316 (SR 316) is a 14.05-mile (22.61 km) long state highway located in Pickaway County, Ohio. The east–west route runs from SR 56 in the Five Points section of Monroe Township to SR 752 in Ashville.

== Route description ==
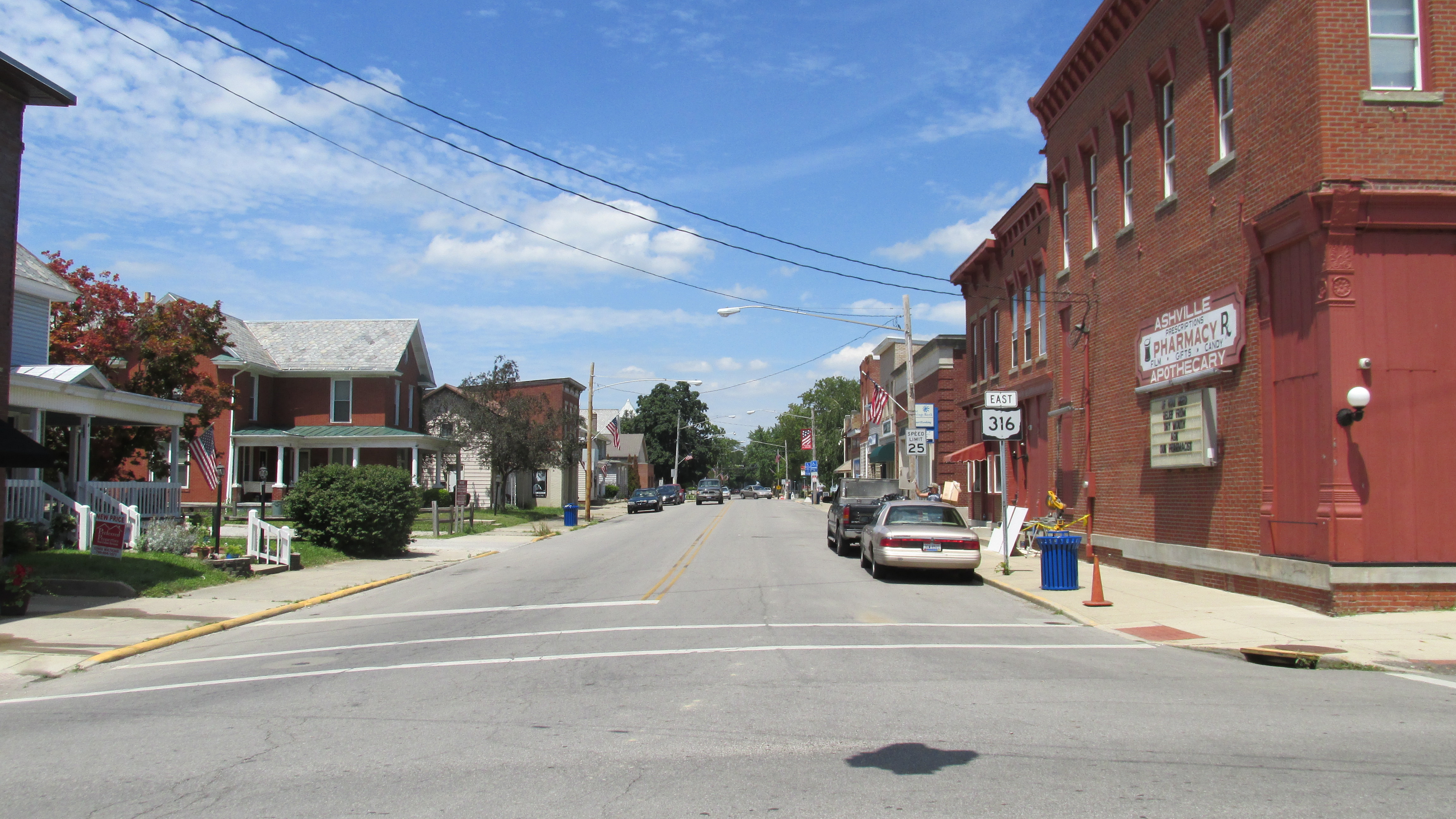
Eastbound SR 316 (northbound Long Street) in Ashville

SR 316 begins at a five-point intersection with SR 56 and Palestine–Williamsport Road in the aptly-named Five Points community within Monroe Township. The route heads east-northeast through farmland for about 4 miles (6.4 km) before entering the village of Darbyville. After its brief stint in Darbyville, the route crosses the Big Darby Creek and climbs a hill before entering more farmland. SR 316 gradually curves due east and intersects SR 104 before crossing the Scioto River and entering South Bloomfield. In South Bloomfield, the road reaches US 23 (Walnut Street) at a signalized intersection. SR 316 turns south onto US 23 for six blocks before SR 316 turns east onto Ashville Road. As the road crosses over Mud Run and exits South Bloomfield, the road name becomes Pickaway Street. The road then enters Ashville as West Main Street. In the center of town, SR 316 turns north onto Long Street. The route ends at a four-way intersection with SR 752 though the road continues ahead as County Route 28.

== History ==
The first section of SR 316 brought into the state highway system was a 1.5-mile (2.4 km) spur from US 23 in South Bloomfield to Ashville in 1931. By 1937, the route was extended west to Five Points at SR 56. The connection between downtown Ashville and SR 752 was added to the state highway c. 1970.

== Major intersections ==
The entire route is in Pickaway County.

Location	mi	km	Destinations	Notes
Monroe Township	0.00	0.00	SR 56 / CR 21 (Palestine–Williamsport Road) – Circleville, London	
Scioto Township	9.48	15.26	SR 104 – Columbus, Chillicothe	
South Bloomfield	11.27	18.14	US 23 north / North Street – Columbus	Western end of US 23 concurrency
South Bloomfield	11.55	18.59	US 23 south (Walnut Avenue) / Northup Avenue – Circleville	Eastern end of US 23 concurrency
Ashville	14.05	22.61	SR 752 / CR 28 (Ashville Pike)	
1.000 mi = 1.609 km; 1.000 km = 0.621 mi: Concurrency terminus
