= Leistville, Ohio =

Unincorporated community in Ohio, U.S.

Coordinates: 39°31′47″N 82°50′20″W

Leistville is an unincorporated community in Pickaway County, in the U.S. state of Ohio.

== History ==
A post office called Leistville was established in 1846, and remained in operation until 1902. In 1906, Leistville had between 40 and 50 residents.
