= Muhlenberg Township, Pickaway County, Ohio =

Township in Ohio, US

- Township
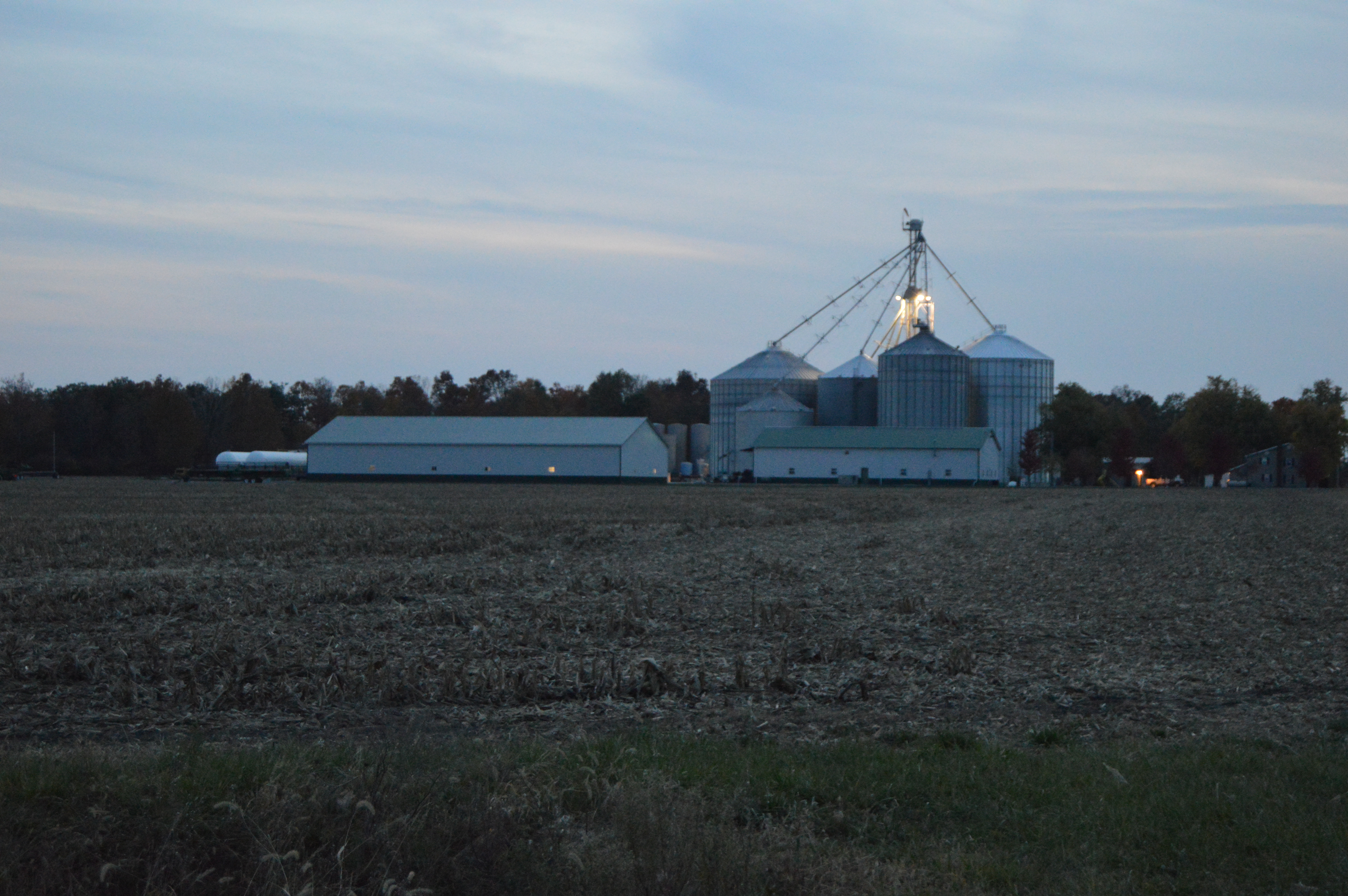
- Farm on State Route 316 northeast of Darbyville

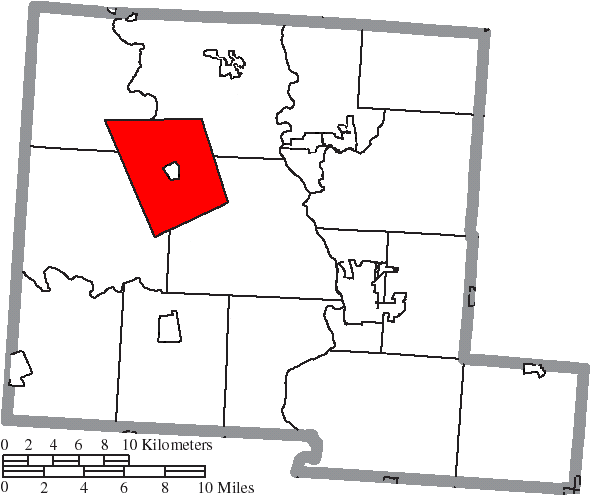
- Location of Muhlenberg Township in Pickaway County
- Coordinates: 39°41′45″N 83°7′9″W
- Country: United States
- State: Ohio
- County: Pickaway

Area
  - Total: 22.6 sq mi (58.6 km^{2})
  - Land: 22.5 sq mi (58.2 km^{2})
  - Water: 0.15 sq mi (0.4 km^{2})
- Elevation: 732 ft (223 m)

Population (2020)
  - Total: 813
  - Density: 36/sq mi (14/km^{2})
- Time zone: UTC-5 (Eastern (EST))
  - Summer (DST): UTC-4 (EDT)
- FIPS code: 39-53256
- GNIS feature ID: 1086799
- Website: https://muhlenbergtownshipoh.gov/

Muhlenberg Township is one of the fifteen townships of Pickaway County, Ohio, United States. The 2020 census found 813 people in the township.

== Geography ==
Located in the northwestern part of the county, it borders the following townships:

- Scioto Township - northeast
- Jackson Township - southeast
- Monroe Township - southwest
- Darby Township - northwest

The village of Darbyville is located in central Muhlenberg Township.

== Name and history ==
It is the only Muhlenberg Township statewide.

== Government ==
The township is governed by a three-member board of trustees, who are elected in November of odd-numbered years to a four-year term beginning on the following January 1. Two are elected in the year after the presidential election and one is elected in the year before it. There is also an elected township fiscal officer, who serves a four-year term beginning on April 1 of the year after the election, which is held in November of the year before the presidential election. Vacancies in the fiscal officership or on the board of trustees are filled by the remaining trustees.
