= Five Points, Pickaway County, Ohio =

Unincorporated community in Ohio, U.S.

Coordinates: 39°40′28″N 83°10′49″W

Five Points is an unincorporated community in Monroe Township, Pickaway County, in the U.S. state of Ohio.

== History ==
The community took its name from a 5-way intersection at the original town site. The first store in the vicinity was started at Five Points in 1849. A post office called Five Points was established in 1853, and remained in operation until 1905.
