= Elmwood, Ohio =

Unincorporated community in Ohio, U.S.

Coordinates: 39°30′0″N 82°55′40″W

Elmwood is an unincorporated community in Pickaway County, in the U.S. state of Ohio.

== History ==
Elmwood had its start in 1878 when the railroad was extended to that point.
