= Stringtown, Pickaway County, Ohio =

Unincorporated community in Ohio, U.S.

Coordinates: 39°30′12″N 82°46′27″W

Stringtown is an unincorporated community in Pickaway County, in the U.S. state of Ohio.

== History ==
A post office was established at Stringtown in 1866, and remained in operation until 1905. Besides the post office, Stringtown had a country store.
