= Whisler, Ohio =

Unincorporated community in Ohio, U.S.

Coordinates: 39°29′12″N 82°49′12″W

Whisler, Pinchgut, Whistler, or Wissler is an unincorporated community in Pickaway County, in the U.S. state of Ohio.

== History ==
A post office called Whisler was established in 1883, and remained in operation until 1933. Besides the post office, Whisler had a country store.
