= Walnut, Ohio =

Unincorporated community in Ohio, U.S.

Coordinates: 39°42′34″N 82°51′07″W

Walnut is an unincorporated community in Pickaway County, in the U.S. state of Ohio.

== History ==
The first store at Walnut opened in 1834. A post office called Walnut was established in 1890, and remained in operation until 1902.
