= Ohio State Route 674 =

North-south state highway in Ohio, US

State Route 674

Route information
- Maintained by ODOT
- Length: 16.01 mi (25.77 km)
- Existed: 1937–present

Major junctions
- South end: US 22 near Stoutsville, Ohio
- North end: US 33 in Canal Winchester

Location
- Country: United States
- State: Ohio
- Counties: Pickaway, Fairfield, Franklin

Highway system
- Ohio State Highway System; Interstate; US; State; Scenic
← SR 673	→ I-675

State Route 674 (SR 674) is a state highway located southeast of Columbus, Ohio. Most of the route straddles a county line; about 11 miles (18 km) of the southern part of route is on the Pickaway–Fairfield County line while the next 1.4 miles (2.3 km) is on the Fairfield-Franklin County line. The route's southern terminus is at US 22 just north of Stoutsville while the northern terminus is at an interchange with US 33 in the city of Canal Winchester.

== Route description ==
SR 674 begins at a four-way intersection with US 22 and a county road. The eastern half of the intersection is in Clearcreek Township, Fairfield County, while the western half is in Washington Township, Pickaway County. The route heads north along the county line for about 1.2 miles (1.9 km) until it reaches Bell Station Road / Peters Road. At this intersection, the county line makes a 90-degree turn to the west for about 900 feet (270 m) before turning north again. SR 674 gradually curves to the right and back to the county line; because of the curve, the route is fully in Amanda Township, Fairfield County for 0.40 miles (0.64 km). Once again following the county line, the route has an intersection with SR 188 at a skewed angle; only traffic on SR 674 must stop. Later, the route has an intersection with SR 752 marking that route's eastern terminus. The route follows the Pickaway-Fairfield line for another 5 miles (8.0 km) until Franklin County becomes the county on the west side of the road. Also, at this point, the route is in the incorporated village of Lithopolis. At Lithopolis Road, SR 674 turns left at a signalized intersection and gets off the county line road the remainder of the route. The route heads northwest for 3,300 feet (1.0 km) until turning right at Gender Road at another signalized intersection. Soon after this intersection, the route enters Canal Winchester. After crossing over Walnut Creek, the route passes The Villages at Westchester, a housing development. At Groveport Pike, the route widens to four lanes wide with a center turn lane after having its entire route be a two-lane road. SR 674 has a grade crossing with the Indiana and Ohio Central Railroad and enters an area with many commercial businesses as it approaches its northern terminus at US 33. Just before the interchange with the US 33 freeway, the route becomes a four-lane divided highway. The route ends at the aforementioned interchange with US 33, but the roadway continues north as Gender Road towards the eastern neighborhoods of Columbus.

== History ==
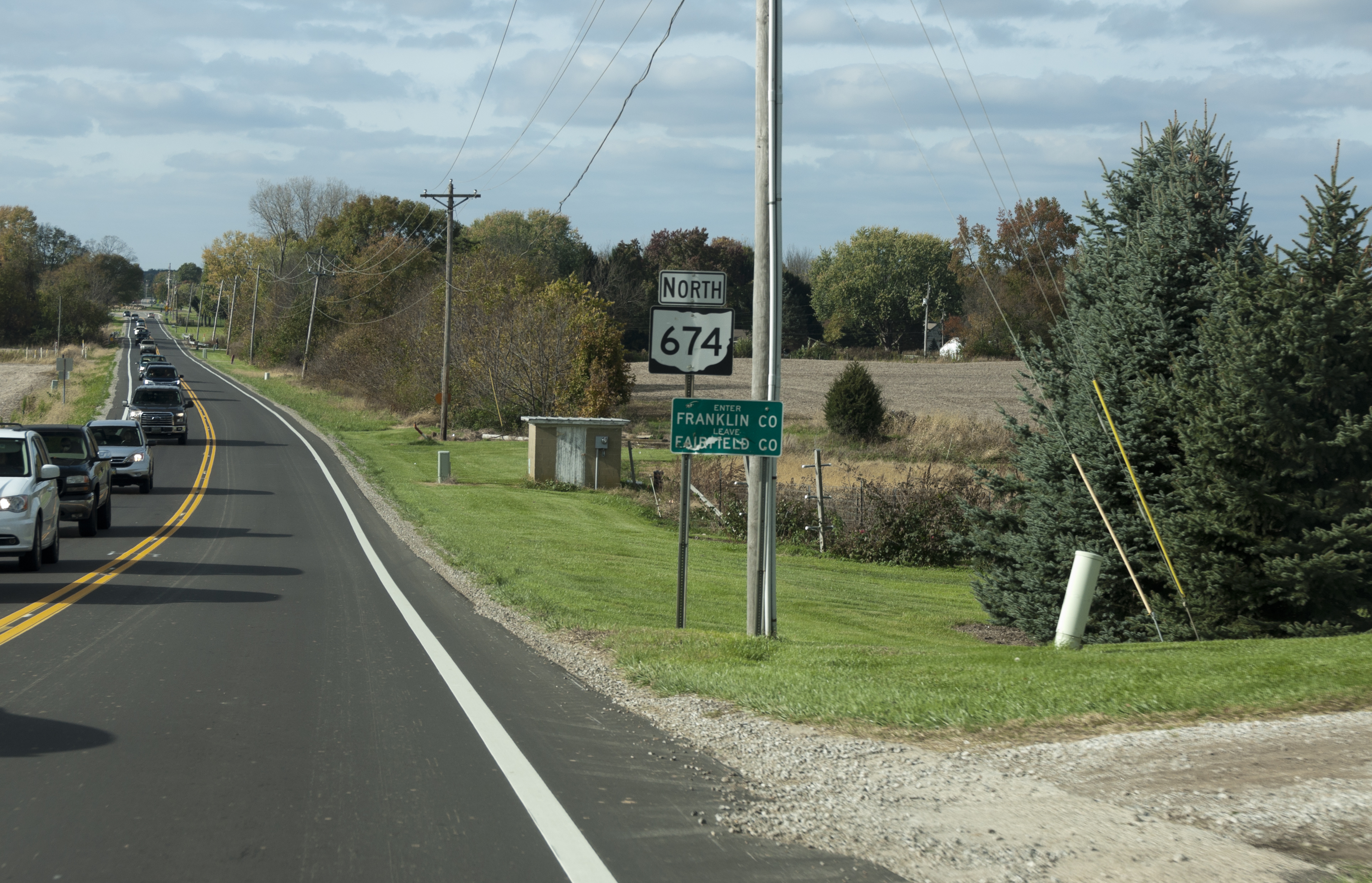
Northbound between Franklin County, and Fairfield County

SR 674 was first designated in 1937 and has generally always followed the same US 22-Canal Winchester alignment. However, at its first designation, instead of turning fully into Franklin County at Lithopolis Road as it does today, it continued north into downtown Canal Winchester ending at Waterloo Street (then SR 31, became US 33 one year later). When US 33 was moved onto a bypass north of Canal Winchester by 1953, SR 674 was extended north along West Waterloo Street to end at an intersection with the new bypass. When US 33 was converted to a freeway in the area in the 1960s, SR 674 was extended slightly to the west to end at a new interchange with US 33. Between 1992 and 1995, the route was routed out of the center of Canal Winchester on the alignment it runs today.

== Major intersections ==
County	Location	mi	km	Destinations	Notes
Pickaway–Fairfield county line	Washington–Clearcreek township line	0.00	0.00	US 22 / Winchester Southern Road – Circleville, Lancaster, Stoutsville	
Pickaway–Fairfield county line	Walnut–Amanda township line	3.11	5.01	SR 188 (Lancaster-Circleville Road)	
Pickaway–Fairfield county line	Walnut–Amanda township line	6.34	10.20	SR 752 west / Royalton Road	Eastern terminus of SR 752
Franklin	Canal Winchester	16.01	25.77	US 33 / Gender Road – Columbus, Lancaster	Interchange
1.000 mi = 1.609 km; 1.000 km = 0.621 mi
