= Kinderhook, Ohio =

Unincorporated community in Ohio, U.S.

Coordinates: 39°34′29″N 83°04′06″W

Kinderhook is an unincorporated community in Pickaway County, in the U.S. state of Ohio.

== History ==
A post office called Kinderhook was established in 1859, and remained in operation until 1918. Besides the post office, Kinderhook had a railroad station, grain elevator, and two country stores.
