= Atlanta, Ohio =

Unincorporated community in Ohio, U.S.

Coordinates: 39°33′41″N 83°11′26″W

Atlanta is an unincorporated community in Pickaway County, in the U.S. state of Ohio.

== History ==
A post office called Atlanta was established in 1866, and remained in operation until 1984. Early variant names were Propsvilla and Corners. Besides the post office Atlanta had a railroad station. There was also a two-story brick school house built in 1903. A Methodist church was also completed in 1896 and is still in use. In the middle of town is a town pump where you could get water for yourself and your horses. The small general store which housed the post office was very close to the railroad. There was and still is a grain elevator where farmers bring their harvest.
