= Duvall, Ohio =

Unincorporated community in Ohio, U.S.

Coordinates: 39°46′20″N 82°57′31″W

Duvall is an unincorporated community in Pickaway County, in the U.S. state of Ohio.

== History ==
A post office called Duvall was established in 1881, and remained in operation until 1955. Besides the post office, Duvall had a grain elevator.
