= Woodlyn, Ohio =

Unincorporated community in Ohio, U.S.

Coordinates: 39°34′12″N 83°06′51″W

Woodlyn or Williamsport Station is an unincorporated community in Pickaway County, in the U.S. state of Ohio.

== History ==
A post office called Woodlyn was established in 1882, and remained in operation until 1906. Besides the post office, Woodlyn had a railroad station and grain elevator.
