= Harrisburg, Ohio =

- Village
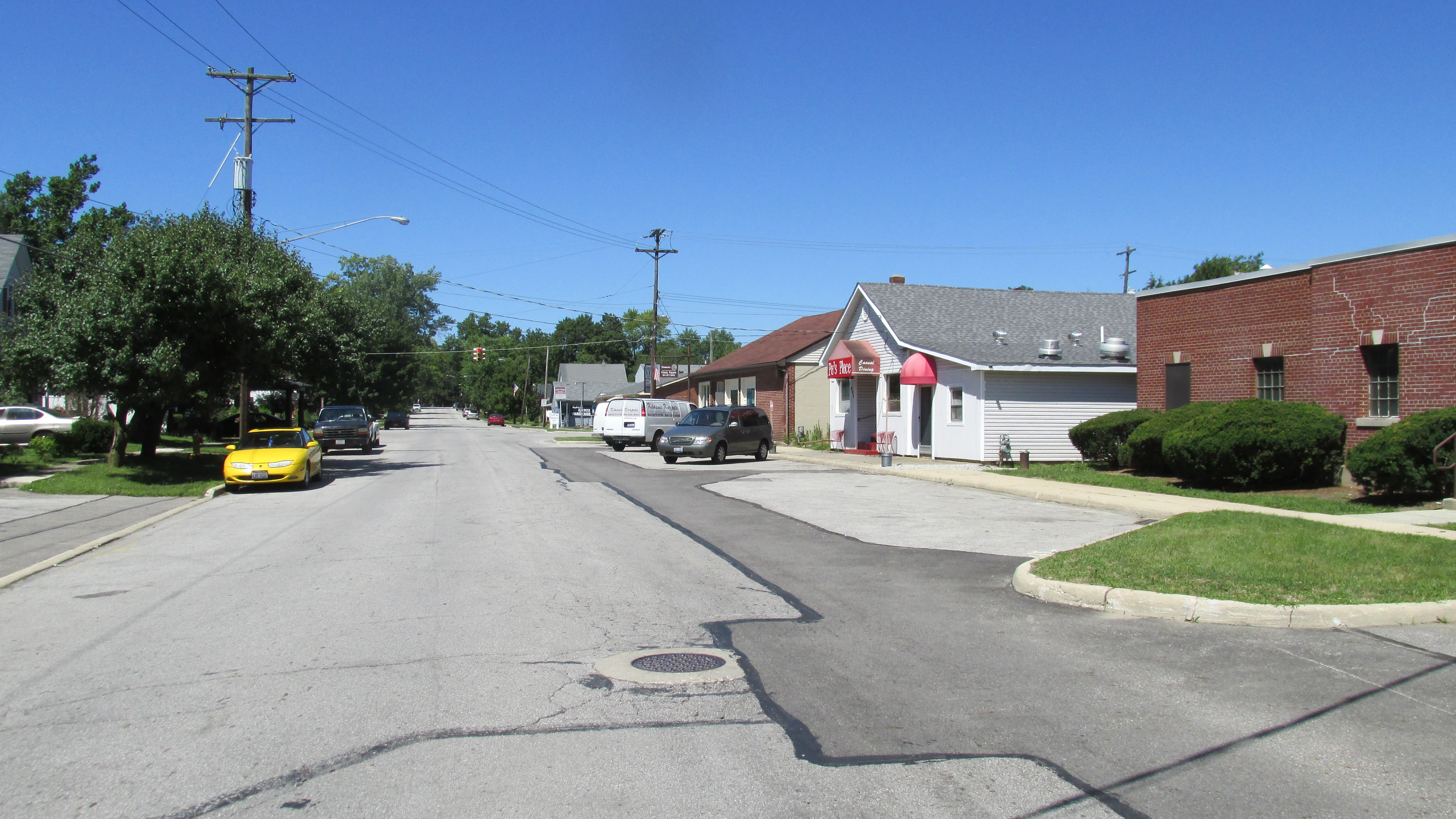
- Looking north on High Street in Harrisburg

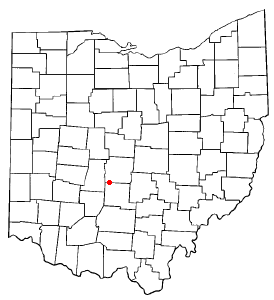
- Location of Harrisburg, Ohio

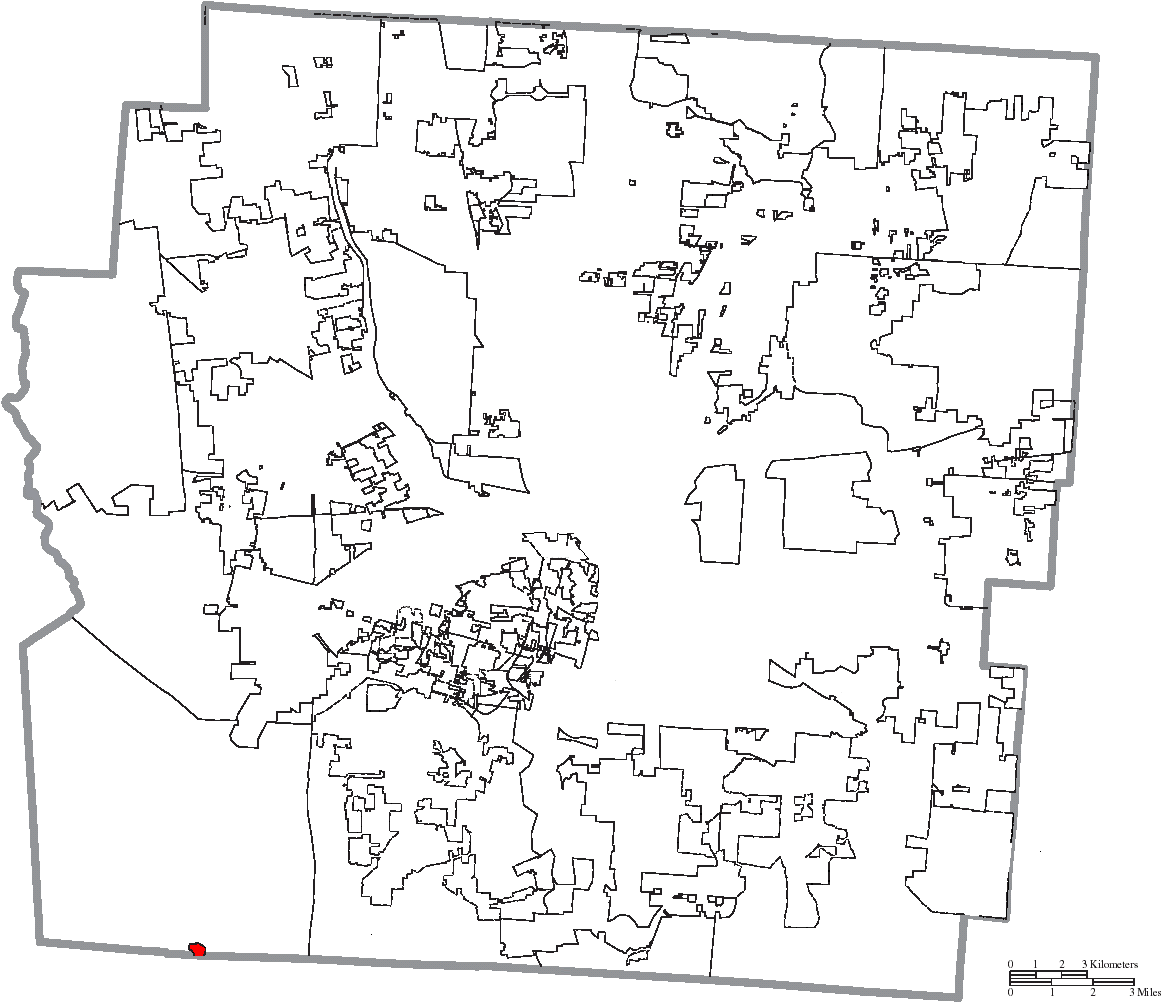
- Location of Harrisburg in Franklin County
- Coordinates: 39°48′39″N 83°10′06″W
- Country: United States
- State: Ohio
- Counties: Franklin, Pickaway

Area
  - Total: 0.15 sq mi (0.40 km^{2})
  - Land: 0.15 sq mi (0.40 km^{2})
  - Water: 0 sq mi (0.00 km^{2})
- Elevation: 797 ft (243 m)

Population (2020)
  - Total: 315
  - Estimate (2023): 309
  - Density: 2,032.1/sq mi (784.61/km^{2})
- Time zone: UTC-5 (Eastern (EST))
  - Summer (DST): UTC-4 (EDT)
- ZIP code: 43126
- Area codes: 614 and 380
- FIPS code: 39-33740
- GNIS feature ID: 2398252
- Website: https://villageofharrisburghome.wordpress.com/

Harrisburg is a village in Franklin and Pickaway counties in the U.S. state of Ohio. The population was 315 at the 2020 census.

== History ==
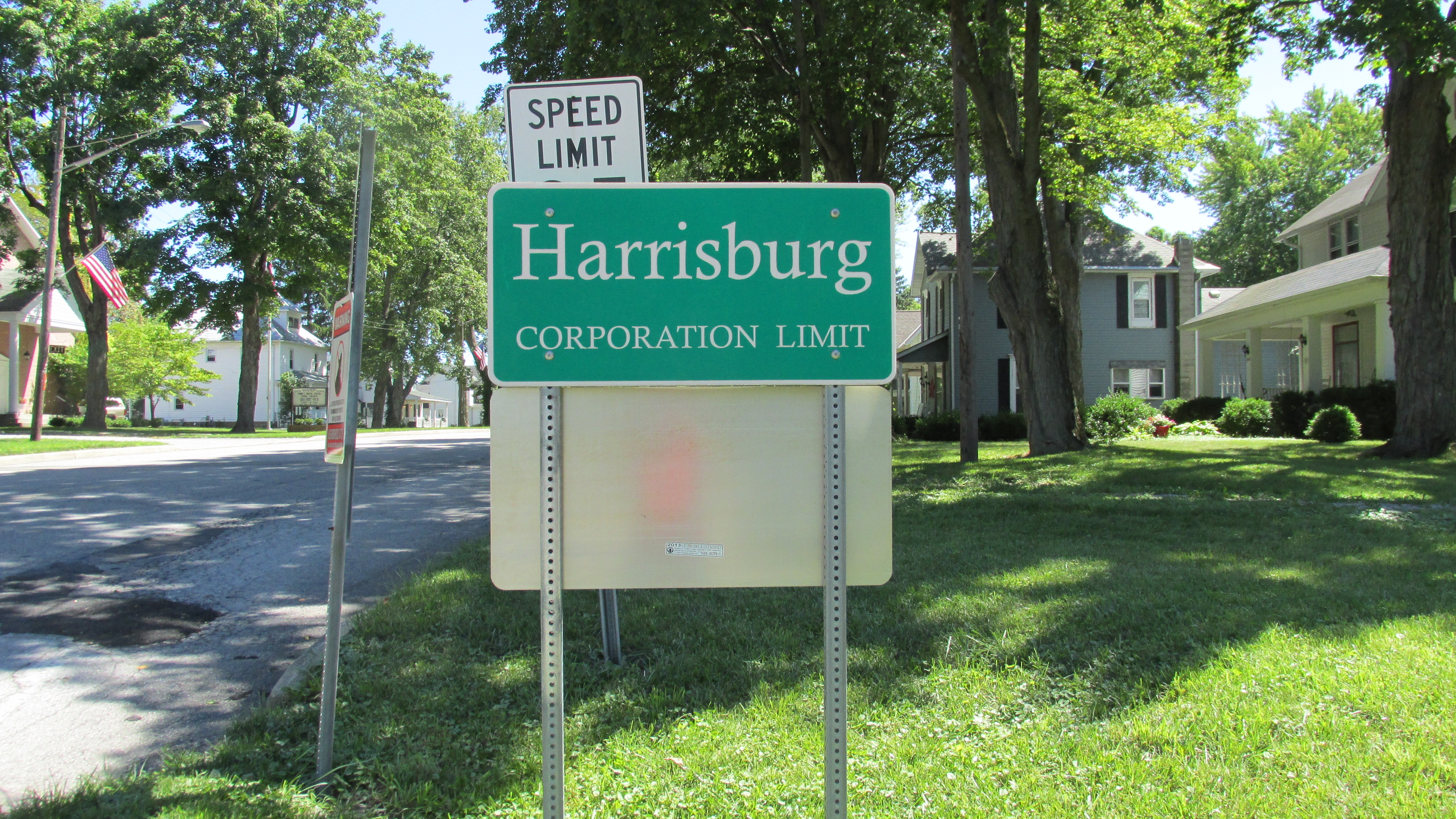
Harrisburg corporation limit sign

Harrisburg was founded in 1836 by Joseph Chenowith, and surveyed and platted by Frederick Cole. Prior to the laying out of the village, the area was known as Darby Cross Roads. The present name is after Harrisburg, Pennsylvania.

Prior to the establishment of the village of Harrisburg, the Big Darby Post Office had been established on March 13, 1834, and the name was changed to Harrisburgh Post Office on February 18, 1835. The post office was, for an unknown reason, discontinued or decommissioned on August 26, 1836, but was quickly re-established on October 21, 1836. The spelling was officially changed to "Harrisburg" on March 30, 1893.

From the outset in 1836 Harrisburg was known as a lively village, and then held about thirty families. By 1858 the population had grown to one hundred and fifteen, by 1900 to around two hundred, and in 1908 was estimated at three hundred.

Harrisburg had an elementary school which was closed in 2008 due to a failed levy. The school merged with Darbydale Elementary School, & the building stood for an extra 6 years before it was demolished.

== Geography ==
According to the United States Census Bureau, the village has a total area of 0.15 square miles (0.39 km^{2}), all land.

== Demographics ==
Historical population
Census	Pop.	Note	%±
1850	109		—
1860	140		28.4%
1870	153		9.3%
1880	186		21.6%
1890	211		13.4%
1900	247		17.1%
1910	286		15.8%
1920	258		−9.8%
1930	276		7.0%
1940	294		6.5%
1950	344		17.0%
1960	359		4.4%
1970	556		54.9%
1980	363		−34.7%
1990	340		−6.3%
2000	332		−2.4%
2010	320		−3.6%
2020	315		−1.6%
2023 (est.)	309	▼	−1.9%
U.S. Decennial Census 2020

=== 2010 census ===
As of the census of 2010, there were 320 people, 138 households, and 86 families living in the village. The population density was 2,133.3 inhabitants per square mile (823.7/km^{2}). There were 147 housing units at an average density of 980.0 per square mile (378.4/km^{2}). The racial makeup of the village was 96.9% White, 0.6% African American, 0.9% Native American, 0.6% Asian, and 0.9% from two or more races. Hispanic or Latino people of any race were 0.3% of the population.

There were 138 households, of which 24.6% had children under the age of 18 living with them, 50.0% were married couples living together, 8.7% had a female householder with no husband present, 3.6% had a male householder with no wife present, and 37.7% were non-families. 30.4% of all households were made up of individuals, and 10.8% had someone living alone who was 65 years of age or older. The average household size was 2.32 and the average family size was 2.91.

The median age in the village was 44.7 years. 19.1% of residents were under the age of 18; 7% were between the ages of 18 and 24; 24.8% were from 25 to 44; 35% were from 45 to 64; and 14.4% were 65 years of age or older. The gender makeup of the village was 50.9% male and 49.1% female.

=== 2000 census ===
As of the census of 2000, there were 332 people, 134 households, and 103 families living in the village. The population density was 3,330.2 inhabitants per square mile (1,285.8/km^{2}). There were 142 housing units at an average density of 1,424.4 per square mile (550.0/km^{2}). The racial makeup of the village was 96.69% White, 0.30% African American, 0.90% Native American, 0.30% Asian, 0.30% from other races, and 1.51% from two or more races. Hispanic or Latino people of any race were 0.60% of the population.

There were 134 households, out of which 32.1% had children under the age of 18 living with them, 61.9% were married couples living together, 7.5% had a female householder with no husband present, and 23.1% were non-families. 20.1% of all households were made up of individuals, and 7.5% had someone living alone who was 65 years of age or older. The average household size was 2.48 and the average family size was 2.84.

In the village, the population was spread out, with 24.1% under the age of 18, 6.9% from 18 to 24, 30.4% from 25 to 44, 27.1% from 45 to 64, and 11.4% who were 65 years of age or older. The median age was 38 years. For every 100 females there were 102.4 males. For every 100 females age 18 and over, there were 93.8 males.

The median income for a household in the village was $43,438, and the median income for a family was $45,781. Males had a median income of $35,417 versus $25,833 for females. The per capita income for the village was $18,327. About 2.9% of families and 3.2% of the population were below the poverty line, including 2.4% of those under age 18 and none of those age 65 or over.
