= Fox, Ohio =

Unincorporated community in Ohio, U.S.

Coordinates: 39°38′36″N 83°00′45″W

Fox is an unincorporated community in Pickaway County, in the U.S. state of Ohio.

== History ==
A post office called Fox was established in 1891, and remained in operation until 1904. Besides the post office, Fox had a blacksmith shop and country store. In 1906, Fox was said to be "a small place" with a population of about 25.
