= Matville, West Virginia =

Matville
- Unincorporated community
- Location within the state of West Virginia Matville (the United States)
- Coordinates: 37°49′43″N 81°19′43″W
- Country: United States
- State: West Virginia
- County: Raleigh
- Elevation: 1,781 ft (543 m)
- Time zone: UTC-5 (Eastern (EST))
  - Summer (DST): UTC-4 (EDT)
- GNIS ID: 1742852

Matville is an unincorporated community in Raleigh County, West Virginia, United States.
