= Westfall Local School District =

School district in Ohio, United States

Address
- 19463 Pherson Pike Williamsport, Ohio, 43164; United States

District information
- Type: Public
- Grades: PreK–12
- NCES District ID: 3904910

Students and staff
- Students: 1,371 (2020–2021)
- Teachers: 82.0 (on an FTE basis)
- Staff: 162.5 (on an FTE basis)
- Student–teacher ratio: 16.72:1

Other information
- Website: www.westfallschools.com

Westfall Local School District is a school district in Pickaway County, Ohio.

The schools included in the district are, Westfall High School, Westfall Middle School, and Westfall Elementary School.
