= Matville, Ohio =

Unincorporated community in Ohio, U.S.

Coordinates: 39°45′50″N 83°06′01″W

Matville is an unincorporated community in Pickaway County, in the U.S. state of Ohio.

== History ==
A post office called Matville was established in 1889, and remained in operation until 1902. In 1906, Mativlle had about 50 inhabitants.
