= Scioto Township, Pickaway County, Ohio =

Township in Ohio, US

- Township
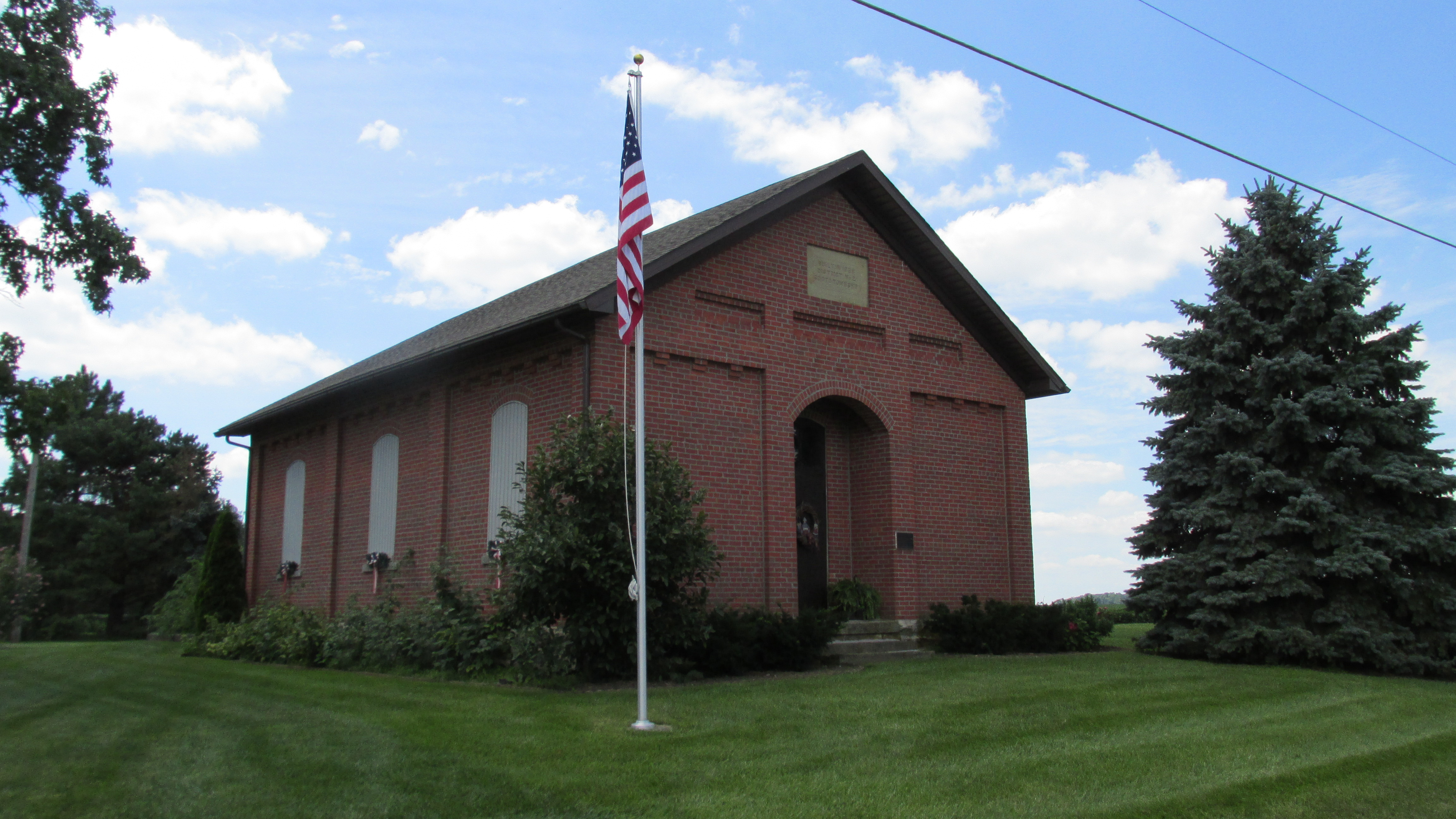
- The District #2 Schoolhouse, a historic site in the township

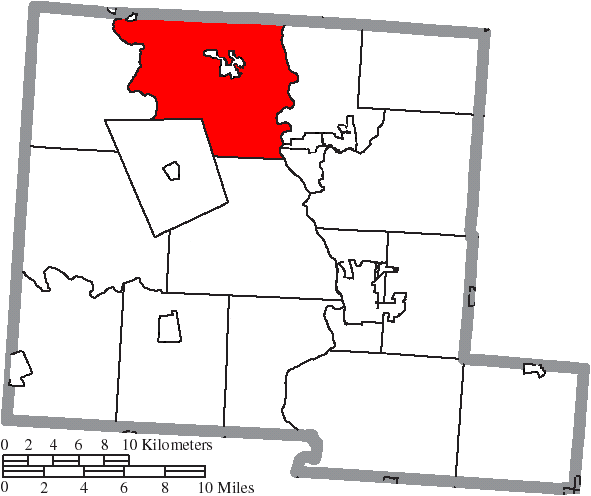
- Location of Scioto Township in Pickaway County
- Coordinates: 39°45′59″N 83°4′8″W
- Country: United States
- State: Ohio
- County: Pickaway
- Established: March 1, 1810

Government
  - Trustee: Ralph Wolfe (since 2018)
  - Trustee: Ron Jahn (since 2024)
  - Trustee: Barton Fannin (since 2022)

Area
  - Total: 45.0 sq mi (116.6 km^{2})
  - Land: 44.5 sq mi (115.2 km^{2})
  - Water: 0.54 sq mi (1.4 km^{2})
- Elevation: 850 ft (259 m)

Population (2020)
  - Total: 11,712
  - Density: 263/sq mi (101.7/km^{2})
- Time zone: UTC-5 (Eastern (EST))
  - Summer (DST): UTC-4 (EDT)
- FIPS code: 39-70870
- GNIS feature ID: 1086803
- Website: https://sciototownship.mapyourcampaign.com/

Scioto Township is one of the fifteen townships of Pickaway County, Ohio, United States. The 2020 United States Census found 11,712 people in the township.

== Geography ==
Located in the northern part of the county, it borders the following townships:

- Jackson Township, Franklin County - north
- Hamilton Township, Franklin County - northeast
- Harrison Township - east
- Jackson Township - south
- Muhlenberg Township - southwest
- Darby Township - west
- Pleasant Township, Franklin County - northwest

There is only one village located in Scioto Township, which is Commercial Point in the center of the township. Additional areas include the Census-designated place of Orient, located in the northwest, the Unincorporated Communities of Robtown in the southwest, and Southern Point in the northeast corner.

== Name and history ==
Scioto Township was transferred to Pickaway County from Franklin County on March 1, 1810, by the Ohio General Assembly, when the new county was formed. The township was boarded to the east by the Scioto River and to the west and south by Darby Creek. The township gave part of it land to Jackson Township in 1830 and additional land to Muhlenberg Township upon its formation.

Early settlers came from primarily Pennsylvania and Virginia beginning in 1800, with Thomas and John Thompson, both of whom were soldiers in the American Revolutionary War. The first town established was Robtown, by Michael and Issac Robison, a father and son pair, in 1822. Wiley H. Beckett, created the village of Genoa in 1841 and two years later, James H. Burnley, created the village of Rome. The towns combined when the Village was incorporated in on March 21, 1851, with Genoa being the western half and Rome being the eastern. In 1872, the town changed its name to Commercial Point, which was suggested by Eli Harsh.

The township is named after the Scioto River and it is one of five Scioto Townships statewide.

== Government ==
The township is governed by a three-member board of trustees, who are elected in November of odd-numbered years to a four-year term beginning on the following January 1. Two are elected in the year after the presidential election and one is elected in the year before it. There is also an elected township fiscal officer, who serves a four-year term beginning on April 1 of the year after the election, which is held in November of the year before the presidential election. Vacancies in the fiscal officership or on the board of trustees are filled by the remaining trustees.
