= Pickaway County, Ohio =

County in Ohio, United States

- County
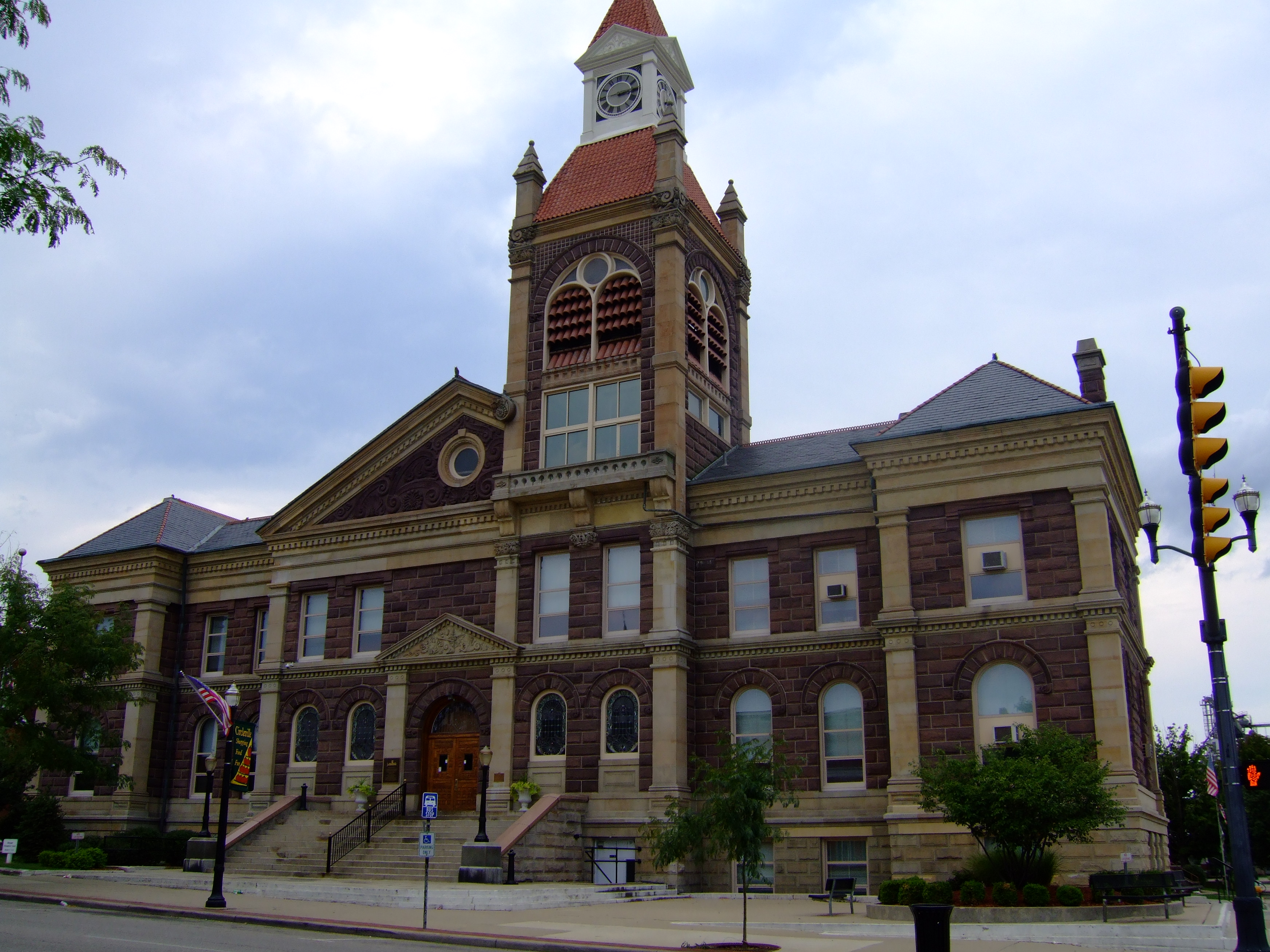
- Pickaway County Courthouse

- Flag Seal

- Location within the U.S. state of Ohio
- Coordinates: 39°38′N 83°02′W
- Country: United States
- State: Ohio
- Founded: March 1, 1810
- Named for: Pekowi band
- Seat: Circleville
- Largest city: Circleville

Area
  - Total: 507 sq mi (1,310 km^{2})
  - Land: 501.32 sq mi (1,298.4 km^{2})
  - Water: 5.23 sq mi (13.5 km^{2}) 1.0%

Population (2020)
  - Total: 58,539
  - Estimate (2025): 62,978 ▲
  - Density: 120/sq mi (46/km^{2})
- Time zone: UTC−5 (Eastern)
  - Summer (DST): UTC−4 (EDT)
- Congressional district: 2nd
- Website: www.pickaway.org

Pickaway County is a county in the U.S. state of Ohio. As of the 2020 census, the population was 58,539. Its county seat is Circleville. Its name derives from the Pekowi band of Shawnee Indians, who inhabited the area. (See List of Ohio county name etymologies.)

Pickaway County is part of the Columbus, OH Metropolitan Statistical Area.

== History ==
The future state of Ohio was part of the Northwest Territory, created in 1787. To begin providing local control of this area, several counties were designated, among them Washington (1788) and Wayne (1796) Counties. Portions of these counties were partitioned off to create Ross (1798), Fairfield (1800), and Franklin (1803) Counties. An act of the General Assembly of Ohio (January 12, 1810) directed that portions of Fairfield, Franklin, and Ross counties were to be partitioned off to create Pickaway County effective March 1, 1810, with Circleville named as county seat later that year (see History of Circleville).

== Geography ==
The Scioto River flows southward through the center of Pickaway County. Big Darby Creek drains the upper western part of the county, discharging into the Scioto at Circleville, and Deer Creek drains the lower western part of the county, flowing southward into Ross County. The county terrain consists of low rolling hills carved with drainages; all available areas (87%) are devoted to agriculture. The terrain's highest point (1,090' or 332 m ASL) lies on the county's east border, 2.4 miles (3.9 km) east-northeast of Hargus Lake. The county has a total area of 506.55 square miles (1,312.0 km^{2}), of which 501.32 square miles (1,298.4 km^{2}) is land and 5.23 square miles (13.5 km^{2}) (1.0%) is water.

=== Adjacent counties ===
- Franklin County – north
- Fairfield County – east
- Hocking County – southeast
- Ross County – south
- Fayette County – southwest
- Madison County – northwest

=== Protected areas ===
- A. W. Marion State Park
- Deer Creek State Park (part)
- Stage's Pond State Nature Preserve

=== Lakes ===
- Deer Creek Lake (part)
- Hargus Lake

== Demographics ==
Historical population
| Census | Pop. | Note | %± |
|---|---|---|---|
| 1810 | 7,124 | | — |
| 1820 | 13,149 | | 84.6% |
| 1830 | 16,001 | | 21.7% |
| 1840 | 19,725 | | 23.3% |
| 1850 | 21,006 | | 6.5% |
| 1860 | 23,649 | | 12.6% |
| 1870 | 24,875 | | 5.2% |
| 1880 | 27,415 | | 10.2% |
| 1890 | 26,959 | | −1.7% |
| 1900 | 27,016 | | 0.2% |
| 1910 | 26,158 | | −3.2% |
| 1920 | 25,788 | | −1.4% |
| 1930 | 27,238 | | 5.6% |
| 1940 | 27,889 | | 2.4% |
| 1950 | 29,352 | | 5.2% |
| 1960 | 35,855 | | 22.2% |
| 1970 | 40,071 | | 11.8% |
| 1980 | 43,662 | | 9.0% |
| 1990 | 48,255 | | 10.5% |
| 2000 | 52,727 | | 9.3% |
| 2010 | 55,698 | | 5.6% |
| 2020 | 58,539 | | 5.1% |
| 2025 (est.) | 62,978 | ▲ | 7.6% |
US Decennial Census; 1790–1960 1900–1990; 1990–2000 2020

=== 2020 census ===
As of the 2020 census, the county had a population of 58,539. The median age was 40.3 years. 22.4% of residents were under the age of 18 and 16.9% of residents were 65 years of age or older. For every 100 females there were 109.6 males, and for every 100 females age 18 and over there were 111.1 males age 18 and over.

The racial makeup of the county was 90.1% White, 3.7% Black or African American, 0.3% American Indian and Alaska Native, 0.5% Asian, <0.1% Native Hawaiian and Pacific Islander, 0.6% from some other race, and 4.8% from two or more races. Hispanic or Latino residents of any race comprised 1.5% of the population.

39.5% of residents lived in urban areas, while 60.5% lived in rural areas.

There were 21,005 households in the county, of which 32.7% had children under the age of 18 living in them. Of all households, 53.4% were married-couple households, 16.0% were households with a male householder and no spouse or partner present, and 22.8% were households with a female householder and no spouse or partner present. About 24.2% of all households were made up of individuals and 11.7% had someone living alone who was 65 years of age or older.

There were 22,372 housing units, of which 6.1% were vacant. Among occupied housing units, 73.6% were owner-occupied and 26.4% were renter-occupied. The homeowner vacancy rate was 1.1% and the rental vacancy rate was 6.1%.

=== Racial and ethnic composition ===
Pickaway County, Ohio – Racial and ethnic composition Note: the US Census treats Hispanic/Latino as an ethnic category. This table excludes Latinos from the racial categories and assigns them to a separate category. Hispanics/Latinos may be of any race.
| Race / ethnicity (NH = Non-Hispanic) | Pop 1980 | Pop 1990 | Pop 2000 | Pop 2010 | Pop 2020 | % 1980 | % 1990 | % 2000 | % 2010 | % 2020 |
|---|---|---|---|---|---|---|---|---|---|---|
| White alone (NH) | 42,769 | 44,711 | 48,250 | 52,259 | 52,416 | 97.95% | 92.66% | 91.51% | 93.83% | 89.54% |
| Black or African American alone (NH) | 569 | 2,990 | 3,383 | 1,876 | 2,143 | 1.30% | 6.20% | 6.42% | 3.37% | 3.66% |
| Native American or Alaska Native alone (NH) | 49 | 119 | 141 | 96 | 131 | 0.11% | 0.25% | 0.27% | 0.17% | 0.22% |
| Asian alone (NH) | 49 | 90 | 116 | 206 | 296 | 0.11% | 0.19% | 0.22% | 0.37% | 0.51% |
| Native Hawaiian or Pacific Islander alone (NH) | x | x | 16 | 11 | 11 | x | x | 0.03% | 0.02% | 0.02% |
| Other race alone (NH) | 37 | 22 | 24 | 43 | 153 | 0.08% | 0.05% | 0.05% | 0.08% | 0.26% |
| Mixed race or Multiracial (NH) | x | x | 464 | 619 | 2,486 | x | x | 0.88% | 1.11% | 4.25% |
| Hispanic or Latino (any race) | 189 | 323 | 333 | 588 | 903 | 0.43% | 0.67% | 0.63% | 1.06% | 1.54% |
| Total | 43,662 | 48,255 | 52,727 | 55,698 | 58,539 | 100.00% | 100.00% | 100.00% | 100.00% | 100.00% |

=== 2010 census ===
As of the 2010 United States census, there were 55,698 people, 19,624 households, and 14,286 families in the county. The population density was 111.1 people per square mile (42.9 people/km^{2}). The racial makeup of the county was 94.5% white, 3.4% black or African American, 0.4% Asian, 0.2% American Indian, 0.3% from other races, and 1.2% from two or more races. Those of Hispanic or Latino origin made up 1.1% of the population. In terms of ancestry, 27.0% were German, 16.3% were American, 14.9% were Irish, and 11.1% were English.

Of the 19,624 households, 35.4% had children under the age of 18 living with them, 56.6% were married couples living together, 10.9% had a female householder with no husband present, 27.2% were non-families, and 22.2% of all households were made up of individuals. The average household size was 2.61 and the average family size was 3.03. The median age was 38.5 years.

The median income for a household in the county was $49,262 and the median income for a family was $58,811. Males had a median income of $44,224 versus $35,077 for females. The per capita income for the county was $21,432. About 9.5% of families and 12.4% of the population were below the poverty line, including 19.3% of those under age 18 and 6.8% of those age 65 or over.

=== 2000 census ===
As of the 2000 United States census, there were 52,727 people, 17,599 households, and 13,287 families in the county. The population density was 105.2 people per square mile (40.6 people/km^{2}). There were 18,596 housing units at an average density of 37.1 units per square mile (14.3/km^{2}). The racial makeup of the county was 91.95% White, 6.43% Black or African American, 0.28% Native American, 0.22% Asian, 0.03% Pacific Islander, 0.15% from other races, and 0.93% from two or more races. 0.63% of the population were Hispanic or Latino of any race.

There were 17,599 households, out of which 35.40% had children under the age of 18 living with them, 61.50% were married couples living together, 9.80% had a female householder with no husband present, and 24.50% were non-families. 20.60% of all households were made up of individuals, and 9.10% had someone living alone who was 65 years of age or older. The average household size was 2.63 and the average family size was 3.02.

The county population contained 24.30% under the age of 18, 9.00% from 18 to 24, 32.60% from 25 to 44, 23.40% from 45 to 64, and 10.80% who were 65 years of age or older. The median age was 36 years. For every 100 females there were 122.20 males. For every 100 females age 18 and over, there were 125.00 males.

The median income for a household in the county was $42,832, and the median income for a family was $49,259. Males had a median income of $36,265 versus $26,086 for females. The per capita income for the county was $17,478. About 7.60% of families and 9.50% of the population were below the poverty line, including 13.40% of those under age 18 and 7.00% of those age 65 or over.

== Politics ==
Prior to 1952, Pickaway County was strongly Democratic in presidential elections, only backing two Republican candidates for president from 1856 to 1948. Starting with the 1952 election, it has become a Republican Party stronghold, with the sole Democrat to win the county in a presidential election since then being Lyndon B. Johnson in 1964 in the midst of his statewide & national landslide victory.

United States presidential election results for Pickaway County, Ohio
| Year | Republican | | Democratic | | Third party(ies) | |
| Year | No. | % | No. | % | No. | % |
|---|---|---|---|---|---|---|
| 1856 | 1,724 | 41.32% | 2,066 | 49.52% | 382 | 9.16% |
| 1860 | 2,002 | 42.70% | 2,425 | 51.73% | 261 | 5.57% |
| 1864 | 2,215 | 46.67% | 2,531 | 53.33% | 0 | 0.00% |
| 1868 | 2,176 | 44.40% | 2,725 | 55.60% | 0 | 0.00% |
| 1872 | 2,353 | 46.59% | 2,660 | 52.67% | 37 | 0.73% |
| 1876 | 2,565 | 43.03% | 3,389 | 56.85% | 7 | 0.12% |
| 1880 | 2,910 | 43.63% | 3,753 | 56.27% | 7 | 0.10% |
| 1884 | 2,931 | 42.66% | 3,889 | 56.60% | 51 | 0.74% |
| 1888 | 3,046 | 43.40% | 3,831 | 54.58% | 142 | 2.02% |
| 1892 | 2,953 | 42.89% | 3,759 | 54.60% | 173 | 2.51% |
| 1896 | 3,370 | 44.23% | 4,165 | 54.67% | 84 | 1.10% |
| 1900 | 3,201 | 43.42% | 4,033 | 54.70% | 139 | 1.89% |
| 1904 | 2,976 | 44.63% | 3,492 | 52.37% | 200 | 3.00% |
| 1908 | 3,119 | 43.15% | 4,007 | 55.43% | 103 | 1.42% |
| 1912 | 2,282 | 36.12% | 3,311 | 52.41% | 724 | 11.46% |
| 1916 | 2,629 | 40.37% | 3,820 | 58.66% | 63 | 0.97% |
| 1920 | 5,273 | 48.20% | 5,645 | 51.60% | 21 | 0.19% |
| 1924 | 4,166 | 46.24% | 4,539 | 50.38% | 304 | 3.37% |
| 1928 | 5,871 | 59.87% | 3,894 | 39.71% | 41 | 0.42% |
| 1932 | 4,395 | 40.30% | 6,414 | 58.81% | 98 | 0.90% |
| 1936 | 4,920 | 38.55% | 7,813 | 61.22% | 30 | 0.24% |
| 1940 | 5,974 | 46.42% | 6,895 | 53.58% | 0 | 0.00% |
| 1944 | 5,997 | 52.80% | 5,362 | 47.20% | 0 | 0.00% |
| 1948 | 4,965 | 48.38% | 5,290 | 51.55% | 7 | 0.07% |
| 1952 | 6,836 | 57.23% | 5,109 | 42.77% | 0 | 0.00% |
| 1956 | 6,956 | 60.67% | 4,509 | 39.33% | 0 | 0.00% |
| 1960 | 7,821 | 61.63% | 4,870 | 38.37% | 0 | 0.00% |
| 1964 | 5,317 | 42.11% | 7,310 | 57.89% | 0 | 0.00% |
| 1968 | 6,690 | 53.25% | 3,536 | 28.14% | 2,338 | 18.61% |
| 1972 | 9,661 | 74.30% | 2,978 | 22.90% | 363 | 2.79% |
| 1976 | 7,695 | 54.79% | 5,907 | 42.06% | 443 | 3.15% |
| 1980 | 9,289 | 61.23% | 5,052 | 33.30% | 829 | 5.46% |
| 1984 | 11,942 | 73.90% | 4,110 | 25.43% | 108 | 0.67% |
| 1988 | 10,796 | 68.36% | 4,905 | 31.06% | 93 | 0.59% |
| 1992 | 8,690 | 45.91% | 5,765 | 30.45% | 4,475 | 23.64% |
| 1996 | 8,666 | 49.52% | 7,042 | 40.24% | 1,793 | 10.25% |
| 2000 | 10,717 | 60.41% | 6,598 | 37.19% | 425 | 2.40% |
| 2004 | 14,161 | 61.97% | 8,579 | 37.54% | 112 | 0.49% |
| 2008 | 14,228 | 59.81% | 9,077 | 38.16% | 482 | 2.03% |
| 2012 | 14,037 | 58.11% | 9,684 | 40.09% | 433 | 1.79% |
| 2016 | 17,076 | 68.55% | 6,529 | 26.21% | 1,307 | 5.25% |
| 2020 | 20,593 | 72.73% | 7,304 | 25.80% | 417 | 1.47% |
| 2024 | 21,607 | 73.46% | 7,397 | 25.15% | 409 | 1.39% |

United States Senate election results for Pickaway County, Ohio1
| Year | Republican | | Democratic | | Third party(ies) | |
| Year | No. | % | No. | % | No. | % |
|---|---|---|---|---|---|---|
| 2024 | 19,613 | 67.51% | 8,452 | 29.09% | 986 | 3.39% |

== Economy ==
Manufacturing makes up a significant proportion of area industry and employment; in the 2010 census; 3075 county residents (13.4%) were employed in manufacturing. Circleville is home to the largest DuPont chemical plant in Ohio. Opened in the 1950s, it produces Mylar and Tedlar plastic films, the latter used extensively in the production of photovoltaic modules.

Other manufacturing concerns in Circleville or surrounding Pickaway County include Aleris, a producer of rolled and extruded aluminum products, and Florida Production Engineering (FPE), producing plastic injection molded components for the automotive industry. Georgia-Pacific, a manufacturer of paperboard containers and other paper products, has a plant located south of Circleville. The PPG Industries Circleville plant is the company's center for polymer resin production, primarily for automotive applications.

Other major employers include Berger Health System; Circleville City, Teays Valley Local and Logan Elm Local School districts; Circle Plastics/TriMold LLC; the State of Ohio; and Wal-Mart Stores.

Businesses that formerly operated include the Jefferson-Smurfit paper mill, a 300-acre site, that is being redeveloped. American Electric Power (AEP) owned the Picway Power Plant in the northern part of Pickaway County. The coal-fired power plant operated from 1926 to 2015. A GE Lighting plant opened in 1948. The plant closed in 2017. RCA/Thomson Glass operated from 1970 until its closing around 2006.

In January 2025, Anduril Industries announced plans to build its $1 billion Arsenal-1 manufacturing facility in Pickaway County, Ohio near Rickenbacker International Airport to produce weapons systems, including aerial and maritime drones.

== Education ==
A list of all school districts covering portions of the county, no matter how slight (even if the schools and administration buildings are in other counties):

- Adena Local School District
- Circleville City School District
- Logan Elm Local School District
- Miami Trace Local School District
- South-Western City School District
- Teays Valley Local School District
- Westfall Local School District

=== Teays Valley Local School District ===
Teays Valley is in the northern part of the county. Schools in this district include:

- Teays Valley High School – 1,262 students
- Teays Valley East Middle School (grades 6–8) – 523
- Teays Valley West Middle School (grades 6–8) – 534
- Ashville Elementary (grades PK–5) – 464
- Walnut Elementary (grades PK–5) – 507
- Scioto Elementary (grades PK–5) – 626
- South Bloomfield Elementary (grades PK–5) – 458

Teays Valley has the largest number of students in the county at 4,374 total students.

=== Circleville City Schools ===
- Circleville High School – 559 students
- Circleville Middle School (grades 6–8) – 487
- Circleville Elementary (grades K–5) – 1,029

=== Logan Elm Local Schools ===
Logan Elm consists of the area in Southeastern Pickaway County.

- Logan Elm High School – 559 students
- George McDowell-Exchange Middle School (grades 7–8) – 299
- Salt Creek Intermediate School (grades 5–6) – 262
- Washington Elementary (grades K–4) – 212
- Pickaway Elementary (grades K–4) – 188

=== Westfall Local Schools ===
Westfall lies in the Western part of the county.

- Westfall High School – 422 students
- Westfall Middle School (grades 6–8) – 335
- Westfall Elementary (grades K–5) – 588

=== Pickaway-Ross Career & Technology Center ===
Pickaway-Ross lies just below the county line in Ross County. Students from the following affiliated Pickaway and Ross county districts attend the vocational school:

- Circleville City School District (Pickaway County)
- Logan Elm Local School District (Pickaway County)
- Westfall Local School District (Pickaway County)
- Adena Local School District (Ross County)
- Chillicothe City School District (Ross County)
- Huntington Local School District (Ross County)
- Paint Valley Local School District (Ross County)
- Southeastern Local School District (Ross County)
- Unioto Local School District (Ross County)
- Zane Trace Local School District (Ross County)

== Infrastructure ==
=== Airports ===
The Pickaway County Memorial Airport is located five nautical miles (5.8 mi; 9.3 km) south of Circleville's central business district.

=== Major highways ===
- I-71
- US 22
- US 23
- US 62
- SR 3
- SR 56
- SR 104
- SR 138
- SR 159
- SR 180
- SR 188
- SR 207
- SR 316
- SR 361
- SR 674
- SR 752
- SR 762

== Communities ==
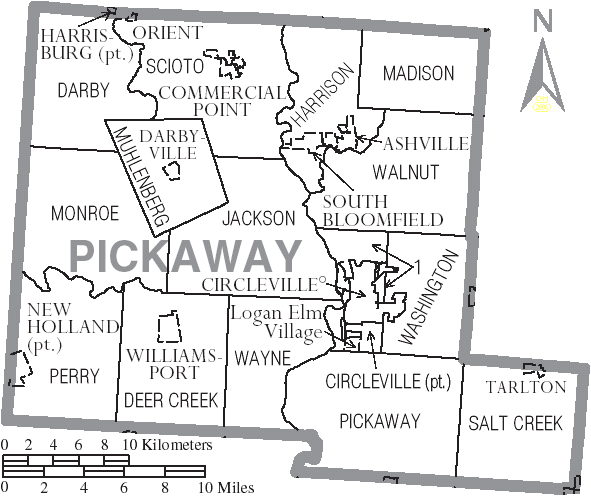
Map of Pickaway County, Ohio with municipal and township labels

=== City ===
- Circleville (county seat)

=== Villages ===
- Ashville
- Commercial Point
- Darbyville
- Lockbourne
- Harrisburg
- New Holland
- Orient (disincorporated 2013)
- South Bloomfield
- Tarlton
- Williamsport

=== Census-designated places ===
- Derby
- Logan Elm Village
- Orient

=== Unincorporated communities ===
- Atlanta
- Duvall
- East Ringgold
- Elmwood
- Era
- Five Points
- Fox
- Grange Hall
- Hayesville
- Kinderhook
- Leistville
- Little Chicago
- Little Walnut
- Matville
- Meade
- Millport
- Pherson
- Robtown
- Saint Paul
- Southern Point
- Stringtown
- Thacher
- Walnut
- Westfall
- Whisler
- Woodlyn

=== Townships ===
- Circleville
- Darby
- Deer Creek
- Harrison
- Jackson
- Madison
- Monroe
- Muhlenberg
- Perry
- Pickaway
- Salt Creek
- Scioto
- Walnut
- Washington
- Wayne
- Yamarick ("paper" township coextensive with the city of Circleville)

== Notable residents ==
- Dorothy Adkins (1912–1975), psychologist, grew up in Atlanta, Pickaway County
- Dwight Radcliff, the longest serving Sheriff of Pickaway County
- Gay Ludwig Hitler, dentist from the Pickaway County Hitler family, of which many places in the county are named after. He was of no relation to Adolf Hitler.

== Other notable aspects ==
Pickaway County is also known for its various places with the name "Hitler", including Hitler Road, Hitler-Ludwig Road, Hitler-Ludwig Cemetery, and Hitler Park. They are not named after the German dictator Adolf Hitler, but rather they were named after a local historical family named the Hitlers, who have been described by a local paper in 2011 as "fine, upstanding citizens". The family included George Washington Hitler and his son, Dr. Gay Hitler, who worked as a local dentist between 1922 and 1946.

== See also ==
- National Register of Historic Places listings in Pickaway County, Ohio
