= Darbyville, Ohio =

- Village
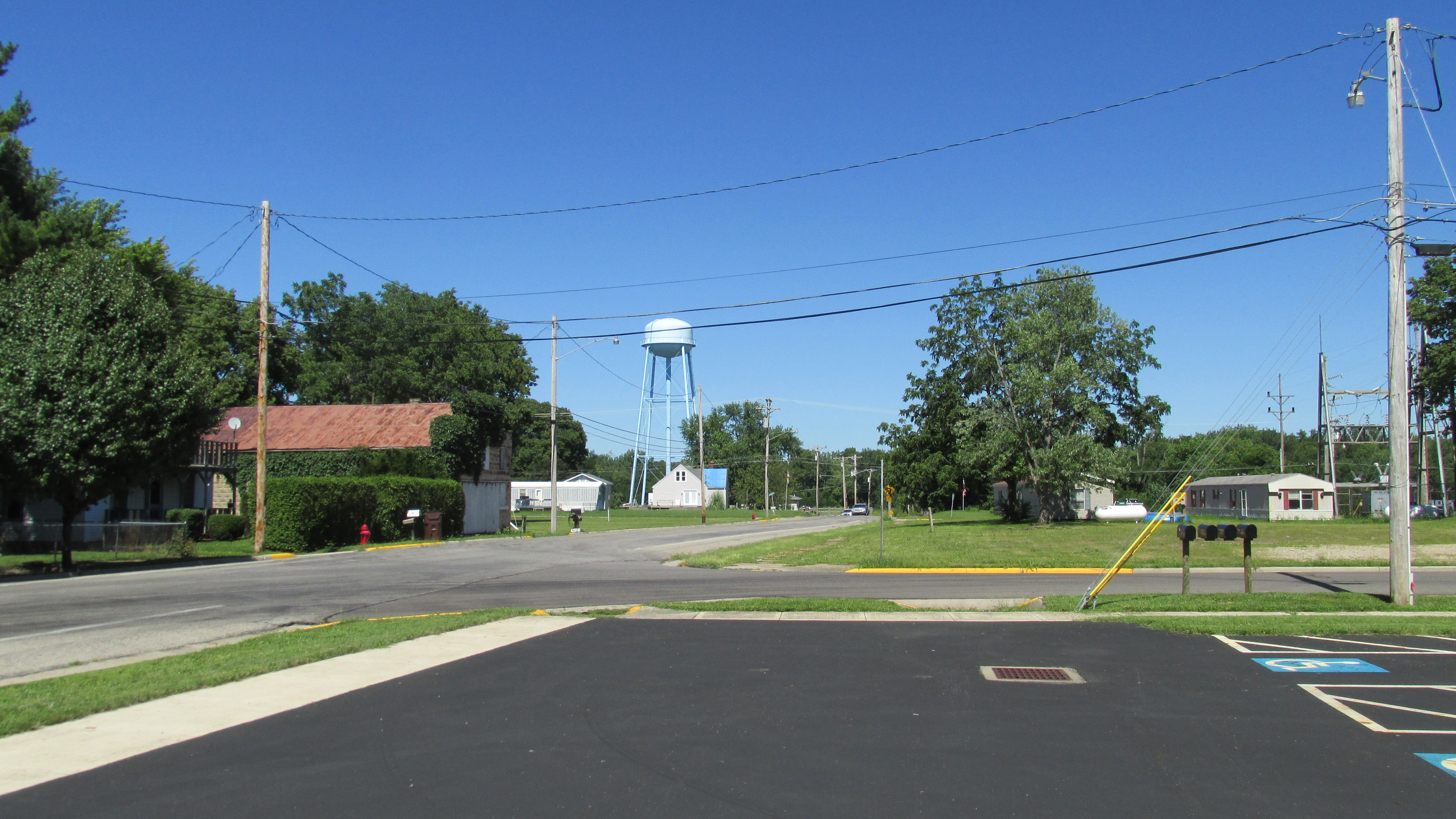
- Looking east on Water Street (Ohio Highway 316) in Darbyville

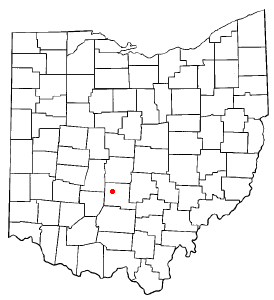
- Location of Darbyville, Ohio

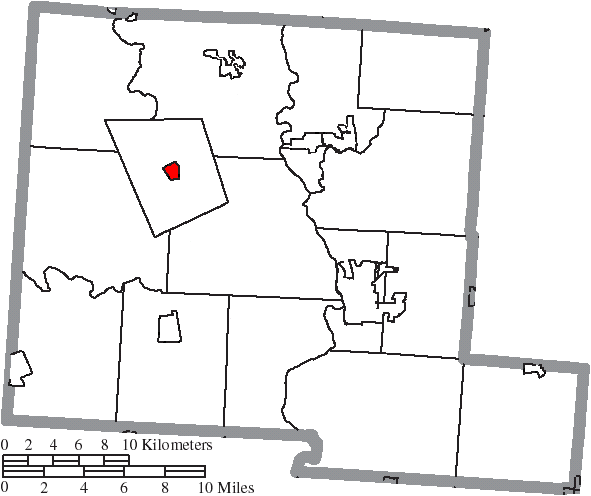
- Location of Darbyville in Pickaway County
- Coordinates: 39°41′45″N 83°06′50″W
- Country: United States
- State: Ohio
- County: Pickaway
- Township: Muhlenberg

Area
  - Total: 0.54 sq mi (1.39 km^{2})
  - Land: 0.52 sq mi (1.34 km^{2})
  - Water: 0.023 sq mi (0.06 km^{2})
- Elevation: 742 ft (226 m)

Population (2020)
  - Total: 186
  - Estimate (2023): 189
  - Density: 360.6/sq mi (139.23/km^{2})
- Time zone: UTC-5 (Eastern (EST))
  - Summer (DST): UTC-4 (EDT)
- FIPS code: 39-20212
- GNIS feature ID: 2398683

Darbyville is a village in Pickaway County, Ohio, United States. The population was 186 at the 2020 census.

== History ==
Darbyville was laid out in 1826. The village takes its name from nearby Big Darby Creek.

== Geography ==
According to the United States Census Bureau, the village has a total area of 0.49 square miles (1.27 km^{2}), of which, 0.47 square miles (1.22 km^{2}) is land and 0.02 square miles (0.05 km^{2}) is water.

== Demographics ==
Historical population
Census	Pop.	Note	%±
1870	233		—
1880	262		12.4%
1890	257		−1.9%
1900	250		−2.7%
1910	233		−6.8%
1920	206		−11.6%
1930	222		7.8%
1940	256		15.3%
1950	203		−20.7%
1960	213		4.9%
1970	229		7.5%
1980	282		23.1%
1990	272		−3.5%
2000	293		7.7%
2010	222		−24.2%
2020	186		−16.2%
2023 (est.)	189	▲	1.6%
U.S. Decennial Census

=== 2010 census ===
As of the census of 2010, there were 222 people, 79 households, and 58 families living in the village. The population density was 472.3 inhabitants per square mile (182.4/km^{2}). There were 92 housing units at an average density of 195.7 per square mile (75.6/km^{2}). The racial makeup of the village was 98.2% White, 0.5% African American, and 1.4% from two or more races.

There were 79 households, of which 36.7% had children under the age of 18 living with them, 48.1% were married couples living together, 13.9% had a female householder with no husband present, 11.4% had a male householder with no wife present, and 26.6% were non-families. 22.8% of all households were made up of individuals, and 12.7% had someone living alone who was 65 years of age or older. The average household size was 2.81 and the average family size was 3.10.

The median age in the village was 38.4 years. 26.6% of residents were under the age of 18; 10% were between the ages of 18 and 24; 24.8% were from 25 to 44; 24% were from 45 to 64; and 14.9% were 65 years of age or older. The gender makeup of the village was 47.7% male and 52.3% female.

=== 2000 census ===
As of the census of 2000, there were 293 people, 94 households, and 75 families living in the village. The population density was 627.4 inhabitants per square mile (242.2/km^{2}). There were 100 housing units at an average density of 214.1 per square mile (82.7/km^{2}). The racial makeup of the village was 97.27% White. Hispanic or Latino people of any race were 2.73% of the population.

There were 94 households, out of which 38.3% had children under the age of 18 living with them, 53.2% were married couples living together, 16.0% had a female householder with no husband present, and 20.2% were non-families. 17.0% of all households were made up of individuals, and 7.4% had someone living alone who was 65 years of age or older. The average household size was 3.12 and the average family size was 3.41.

In the village, the population was spread out, with 31.4% under the age of 18, 5.1% from 18 to 24, 32.1% from 25 to 44, 20.5% from 45 to 64, and 10.9% who were 65 years of age or older. The median age was 34 years. For every 100 females there were 104.9 males. For every 100 females age 18 and over, there were 93.3 males.

The median income for a household in the village was $37,727, and the median income for a family was $37,969. Males had a median income of $28,214 versus $20,000 for females. The per capita income for the village was $11,329. About 18.3% of families and 22.0% of the population were below the poverty line, including 25.9% of those under the age of eighteen and 25.0% of those 65 or over.
