= South Bloomfield, Ohio =

- Village
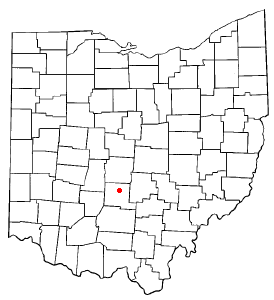
- Location of South Bloomfield, Ohio

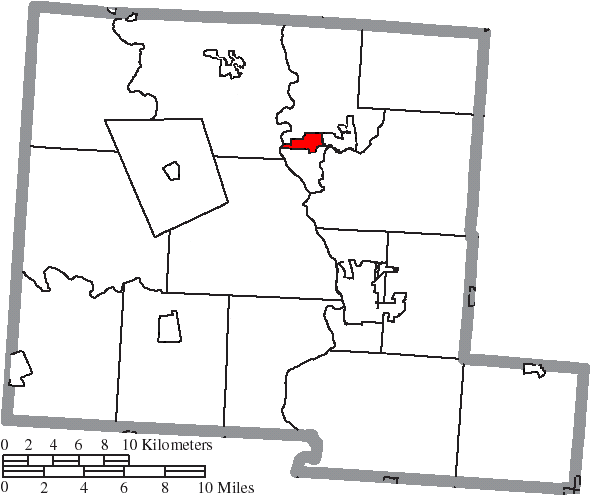
- Location of South Bloomfield in Pickaway County
- Coordinates: 39°42′57″N 83°00′00″W
- Country: United States
- State: Ohio
- County: Pickaway
- Township: Harrison

Government
  - Mayor: Aaron Thomas

Area
  - Total: 3.93 sq mi (10.18 km^{2})
  - Land: 3.93 sq mi (10.18 km^{2})
  - Water: 0 sq mi (0.00 km^{2})
- Elevation: 682 ft (208 m)

Population (2020)
  - Total: 2,143
  - Estimate (2025): 4,164
  - Density: 545.1/sq mi (210.47/km^{2})
- Time zone: UTC-5 (Eastern (EST))
  - Summer (DST): UTC-4 (EDT)
- ZIP code: 43103
- Area code: 740
- FIPS code: 39-73068
- GNIS feature ID: 2399843
- Website: http://www.southbloomfieldoh.com/

South Bloomfield is a village in Pickaway County, Ohio, United States. The population was 2,143 at the 2020 census. Since the 2000 census, it has consistently been one of the fastest-growing villages in central Ohio. As of 2025, the estimated population is 4,164.

== History ==
The town was originally laid out in 1803. General James Denny was originally contracted to survey the area, embracing 40 acres and divided into 80 lots. The founding members in the area had initially hoped that this would eventually be the county seat, but time and politics worked against this idea.

South Bloomfield was once the Puppetry Capital of America.

== Geography ==
According to the United States Census Bureau, the village has a total area of 4.28 square miles (11.09 km^{2}), all land.

== Demographics ==
Historical population
Census	Pop.	Note	%±
1870	283		—
1880	303		7.1%
1890	272		−10.2%
1900	222		−18.4%
1910	212		−4.5%
1920	230		8.5%
1930	235		2.2%
1940	238		1.3%
1950	250		5.0%
1960	424		69.6%
1970	610		43.9%
1980	934		53.1%
1990	900		−3.6%
2000	1,179		31.0%
2010	1,744		47.9%
2020	2,143		22.9%
2025 (est.)	4,164		94.3%
U.S. Decennial Census

=== 2010 census ===
As of the census of 2010, there were 1,744 people, 654 households, and 473 families living in the village. The population density was 407.5 inhabitants per square mile (157.3/km^{2}). There were 688 housing units at an average density of 160.7 per square mile (62.0/km^{2}). The racial makeup of the village was 97.1% White, 0.9% African American, 0.3% Native American, 0.2% Asian, 0.2% from other races, and 1.4% from two or more races. Hispanic or Latino people of any race were 1.1% of the population.

There were 654 households, of which 41.9% had children under the age of 18 living with them, 52.4% were married couples living together, 14.4% had a female householder with no husband present, 5.5% had a male householder with no wife present, and 27.7% were non-families. 21.9% of all households were made up of individuals, and 9.4% had someone living alone who was 65 years of age or older. The average household size was 2.67 and the average family size was 3.02.

The median age in the village was 34.3 years. 28.1% of residents were under the age of 18; 8% were between the ages of 18 and 24; 30.5% were from 25 to 44; 23.3% were from 45 to 64; and 10.1% were 65 years of age or older. The gender makeup of the village was 48.9% male and 51.1% female.

=== 2000 census ===
As of the census of 2000, there were 1,179 people, 473 households, and 347 families living in the village. The population density was 1,026.3 inhabitants per square mile (396.3/km^{2}). There were 505 housing units at an average density of 439.6 per square mile (169.7/km^{2}). The racial makeup of the village was 98.98% White, 0.42% Native American, 0.08% Asian, 0.08% from other races, and 0.42% from two or more races. Hispanic or Latino people of any race were 1.27% of the population.

There were 473 households, out of which 36.4% had children under the age of 18 living with them, 56.2% were married couples living together, 12.5% had a female householder with no husband present, and 26.6% were non-families. 22.6% of all households were made up of individuals, and 8.9% had someone living alone who was 65 years of age or older. The average household size was 2.49 and the average family size was 2.90.

In the village, the population was spread out, with 27.0% under the age of 18, 9.2% from 18 to 24, 29.0% from 25 to 44, 24.0% from 45 to 64, and 10.8% who were 65 years of age or older. The median age was 34 years. For every 100 females there were 94.9 males. For every 100 females age 18 and over, there were 88.0 males.

The median income for a household in the village was $36,927, and the median income for a family was $39,853. Males had a median income of $32,344 versus $24,583 for females. The per capita income for the village was $16,961. About 6.1% of families and 7.8% of the population were below the poverty line, including 8.4% of those under age 18 and 4.5% of those age 65 or over.

== Education ==
South Bloomfield is served by the Teays Valley Local School District.

== In the media ==
South Bloomfield is featured in the Together Concepts video production "We Are... Teays Valley". The video depicts numerous achievements and innovations, as well as connections to American and world history.

== Gallery ==
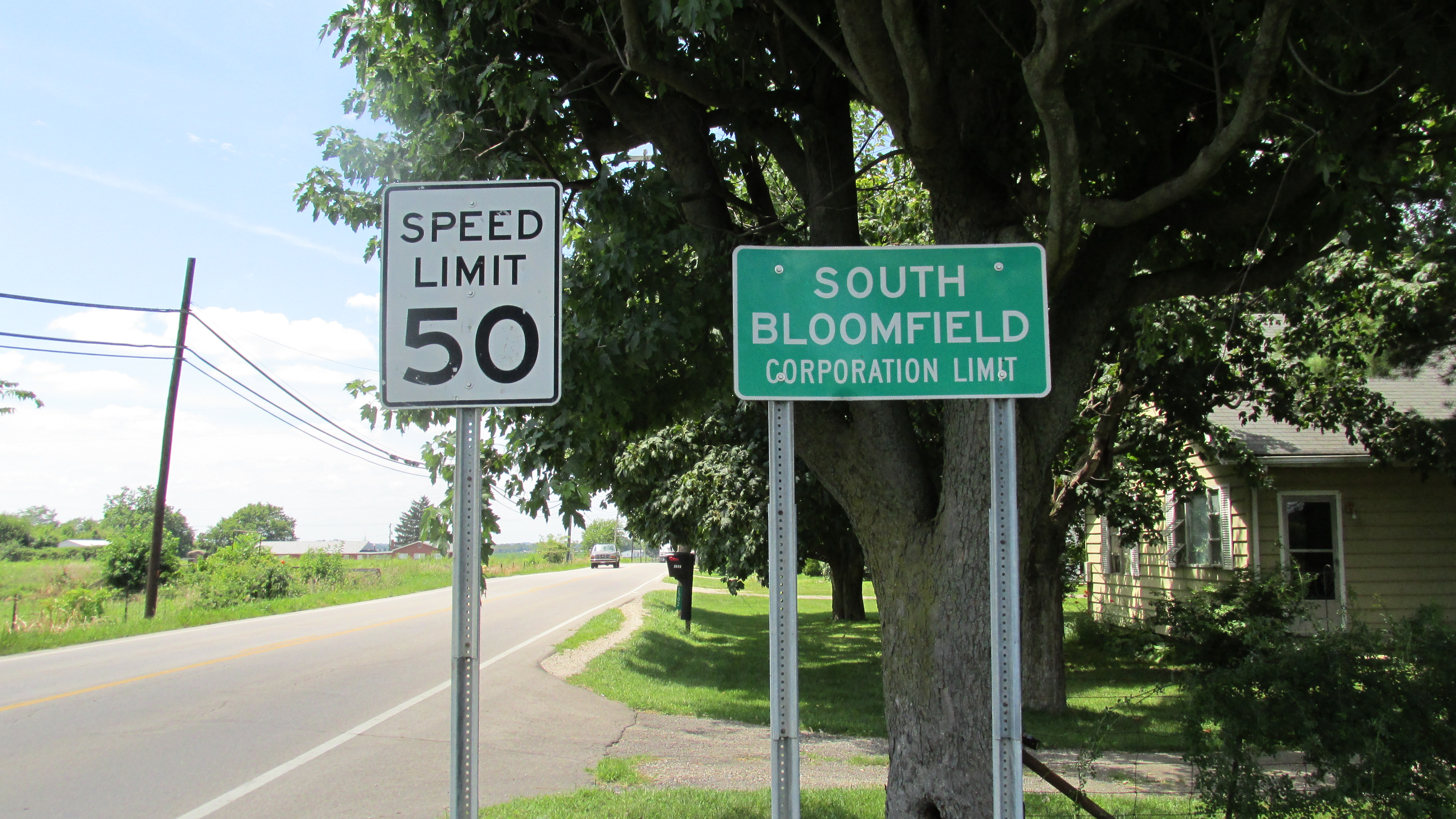
South Bloomfield corporation limit sign

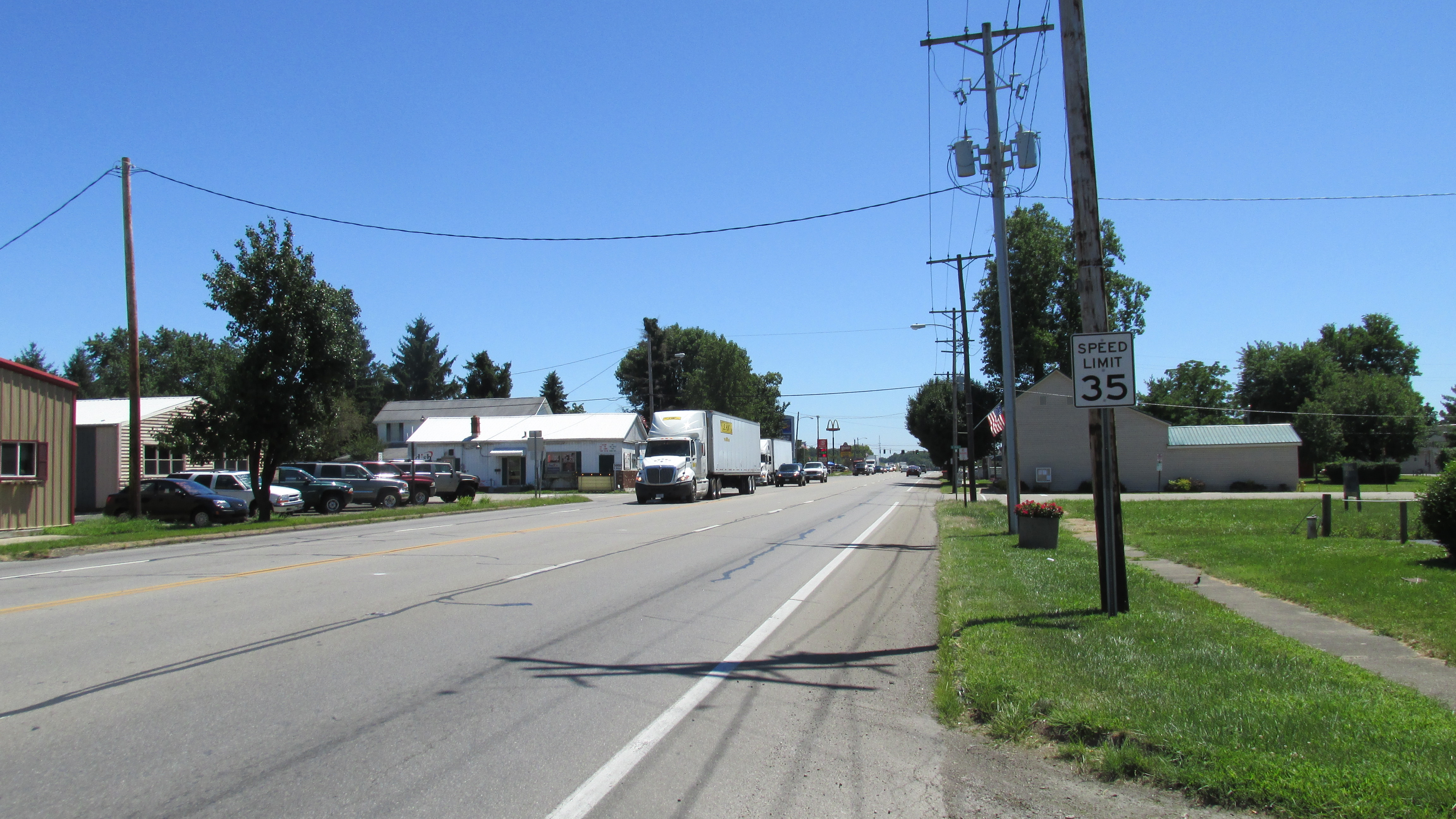
Looking south on North Walnut Street (US Highway 23) in South Bloomfield

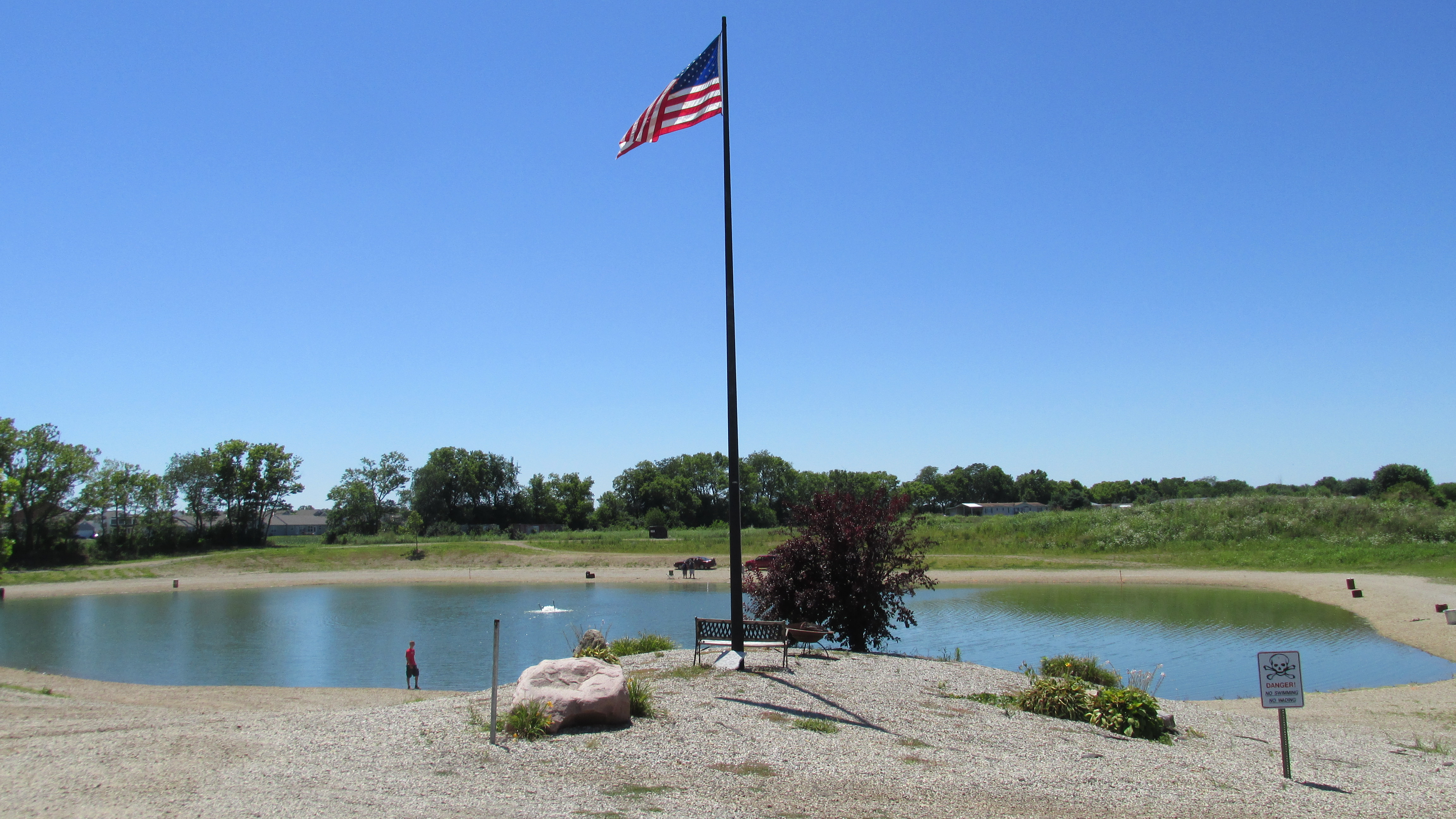
Krazy Kats Pay Lake

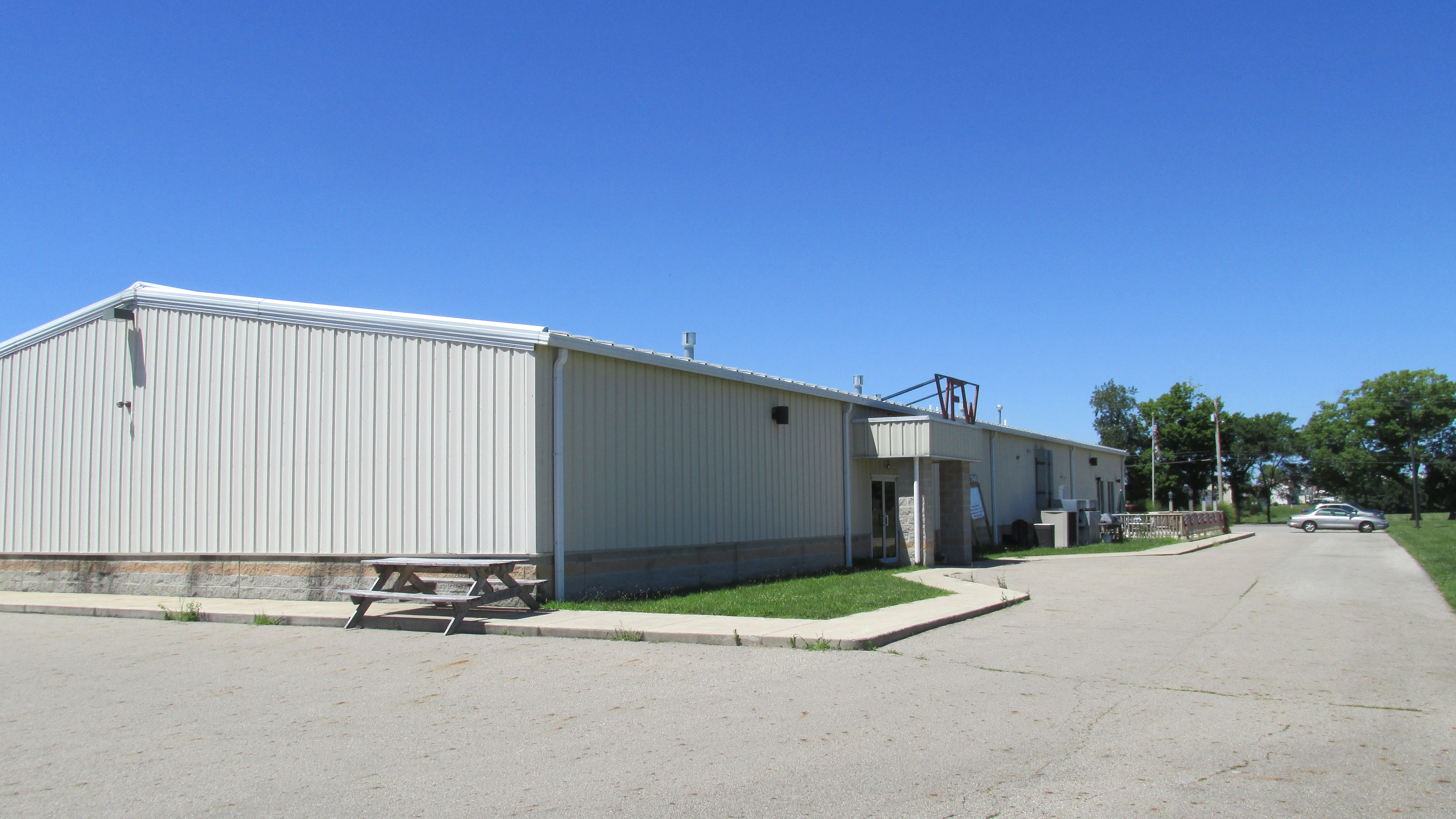
Rick Brown Memorial VFW Post 7941

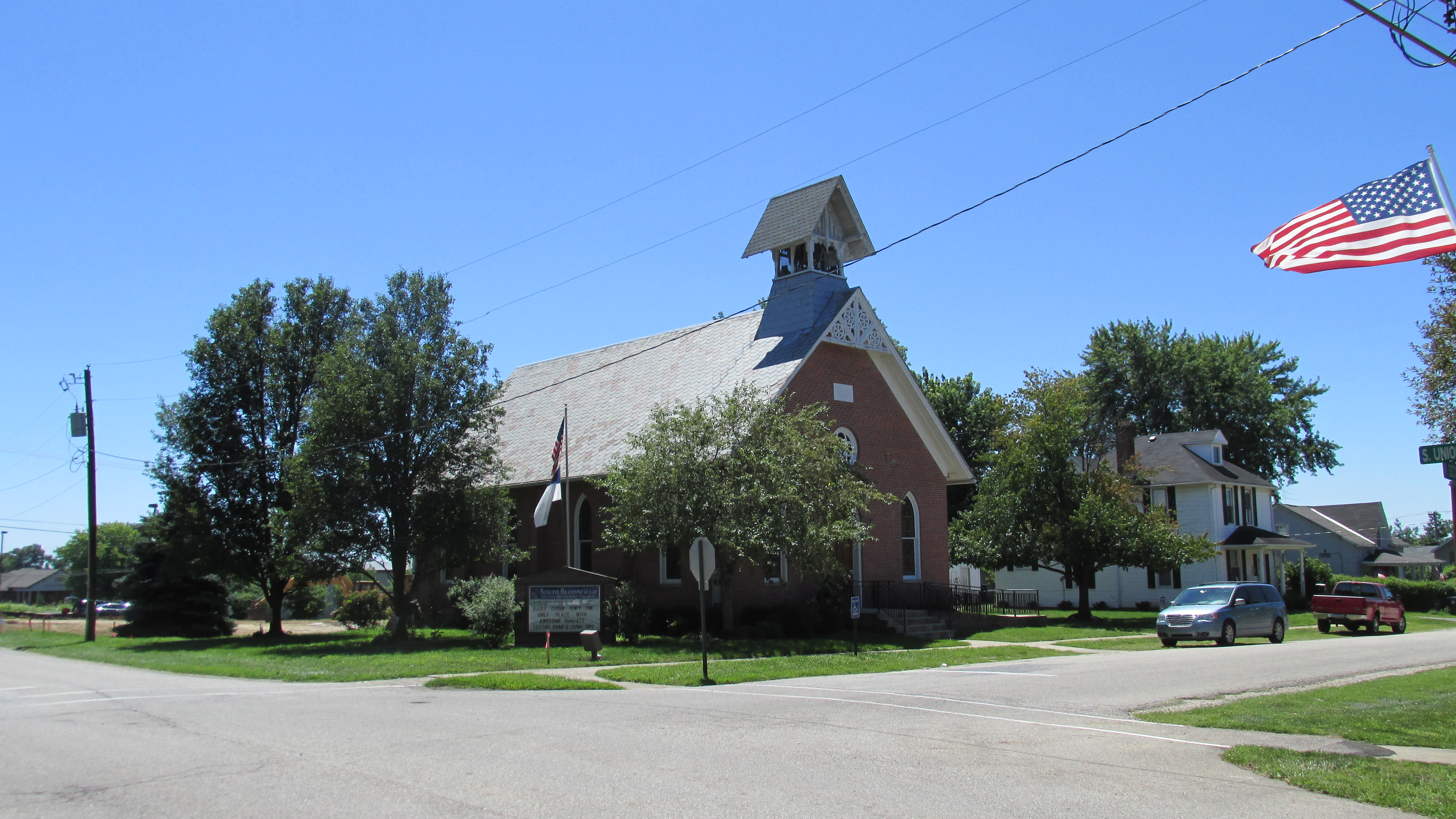
South Bloomfield Methodist Church

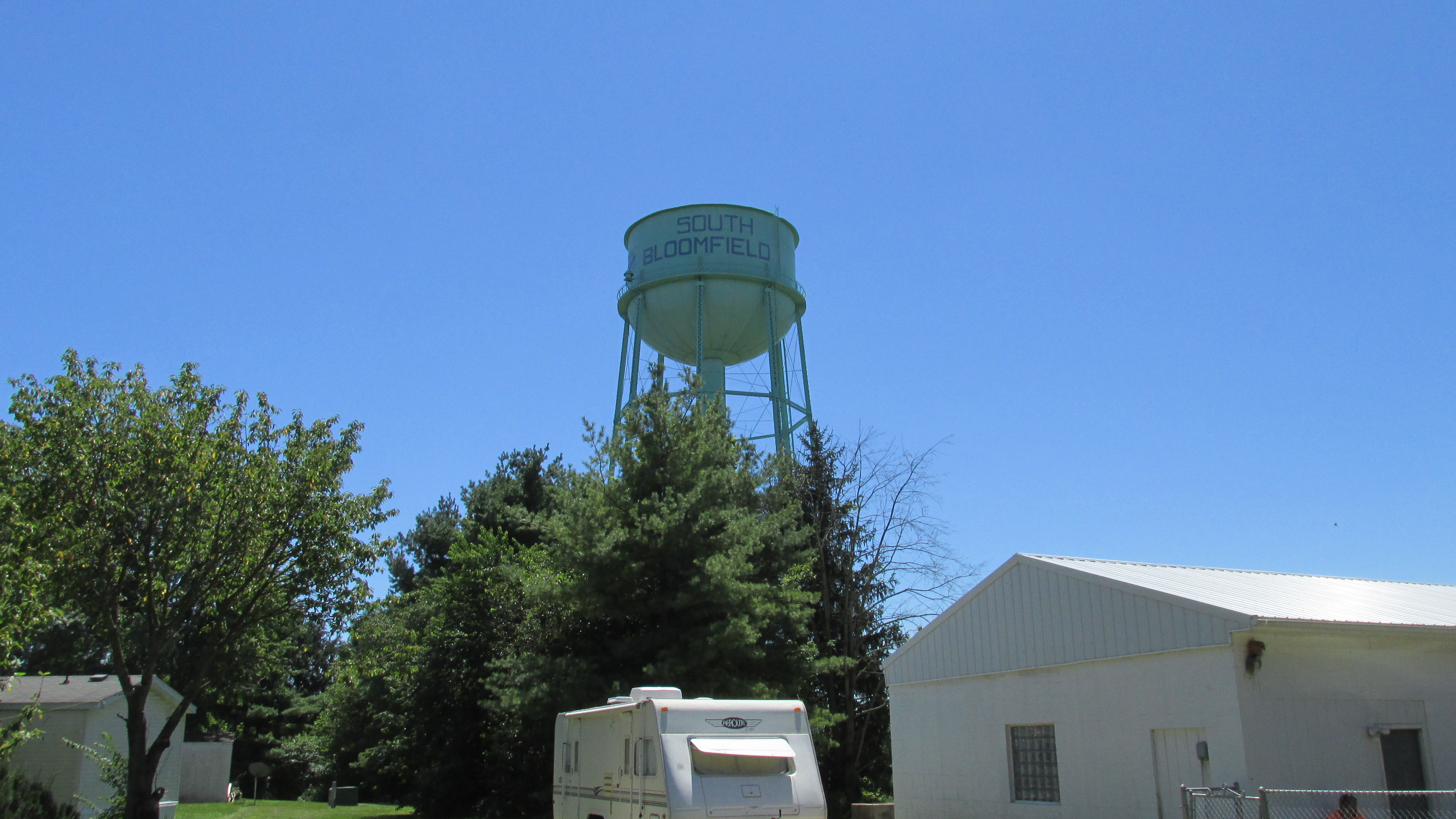
South Bloomfield Water Tower
