= Zane Trace High School =

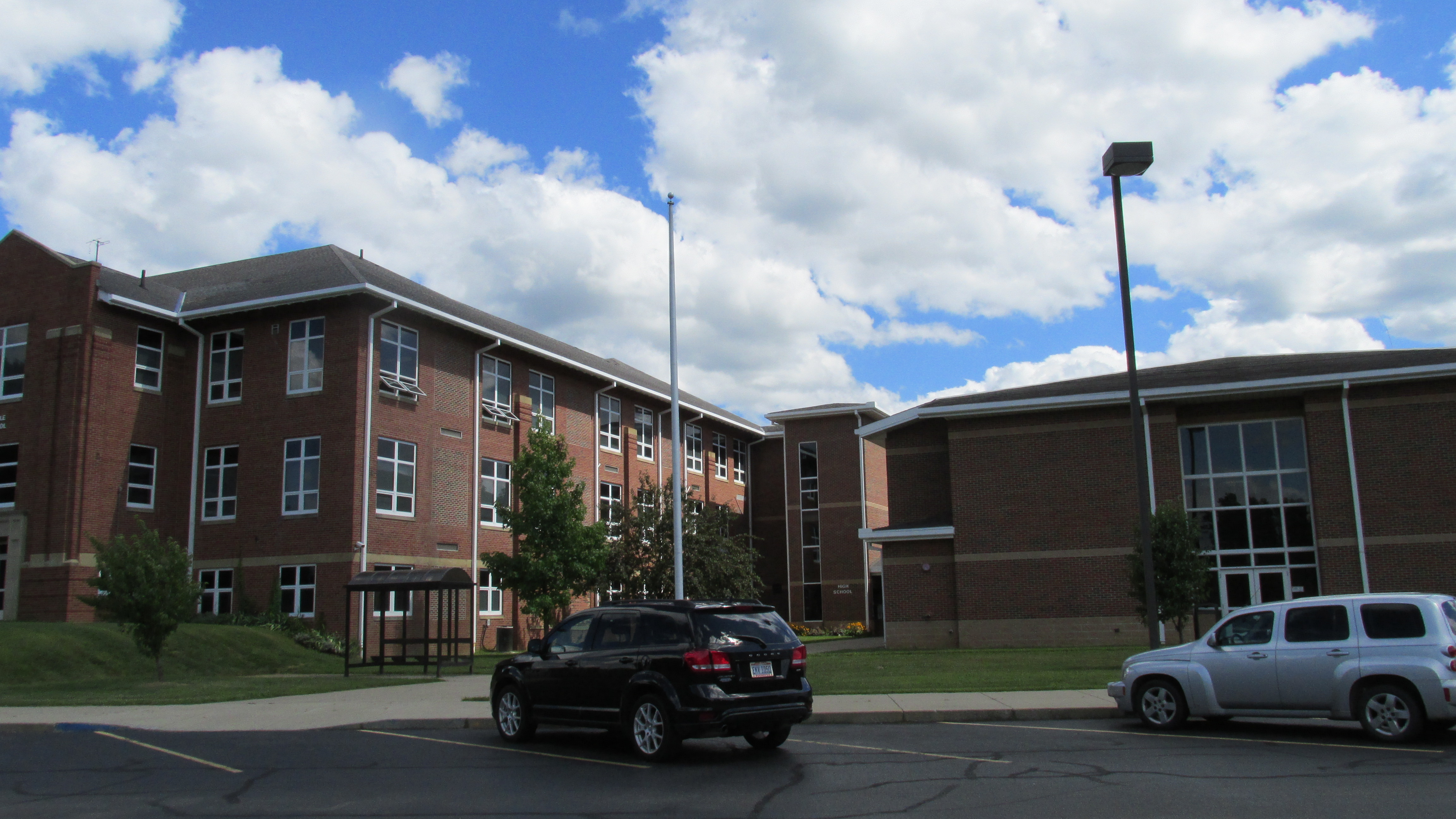

Location
- 946 State Route 180; Chillicothe, Ohio 45601; United States

Information
- School type: Public
- Principal: Ty Wertman
- Teaching staff: 16.00 (FTE)
- Grades: 9-12
- Enrollment: 411 (2022-2023)
- Student to teacher ratio: 25.69
- Color
- Team name: Pioneers
- Website: www.zanetrace.org/o/zth

Zane Trace High School is a public high school near Chillicothe, Ohio, seated along the shores of Kinnikinnick Creek. It is the only high school in the Zane Trace Local School District. Their nickname is the Pioneers, and their colors are red, blue, and white. Their sports programs include: football, boys and girls cross country, boys and girls soccer, boys and girls basketball, volleyball, cheerleading, boys and girls track, boys and girls bowling, swimming, softball, baseball, wrestling, and e-sports.

== History ==
Zane Trace takes its name from a frontier road built before Ohio statehood by Ebenezer Zane. The road followed historical Native American trails and passed by nearby Kinnikinnick Creek. Zane Trace Local School District was created in 1967 when the school districts of Centralia, Kingston, and Adelphi consolidated.

== Awards ==
- 2020 Ohio Department of Education Purple Star Award for Military Support
- National FFA Chapter Star Winner
- Johnny Reed won the Archie Griffin Sportsmanship Award

== Athletics ==
Zane Trace competes in the Scioto Valley Conference.

=== Scioto Valley Conference ===
- Bainbridge Paint Valley Bearcats
- Chillicothe Unioto Sherman Tanks
- Chillicothe Zane Trace Pioneers
- Frankfort Adena Warriors
- Huntington Ross Huntington Huntsmen
- Piketon Redstreaks
- Richmond Dale/Chillicothe Southeastern Panthers
- Williamsport Westfall Mustangs

=== State Tournament Appearances ===
- Bowling 2006 State Champions (non-OHSAA)
- Baseball 1970 & 2001 Final Four
- Basketball 1970 Final Four
- Softball 2005 State Runner Up
- 2010 State champion in 800m Run, while setting state record at 2:08
- 2012 Girls Cross Country state runner up
