= Unioto High School =

High school in Ohio, United States

Coordinates: 39°21′58″N 83°00′47″W

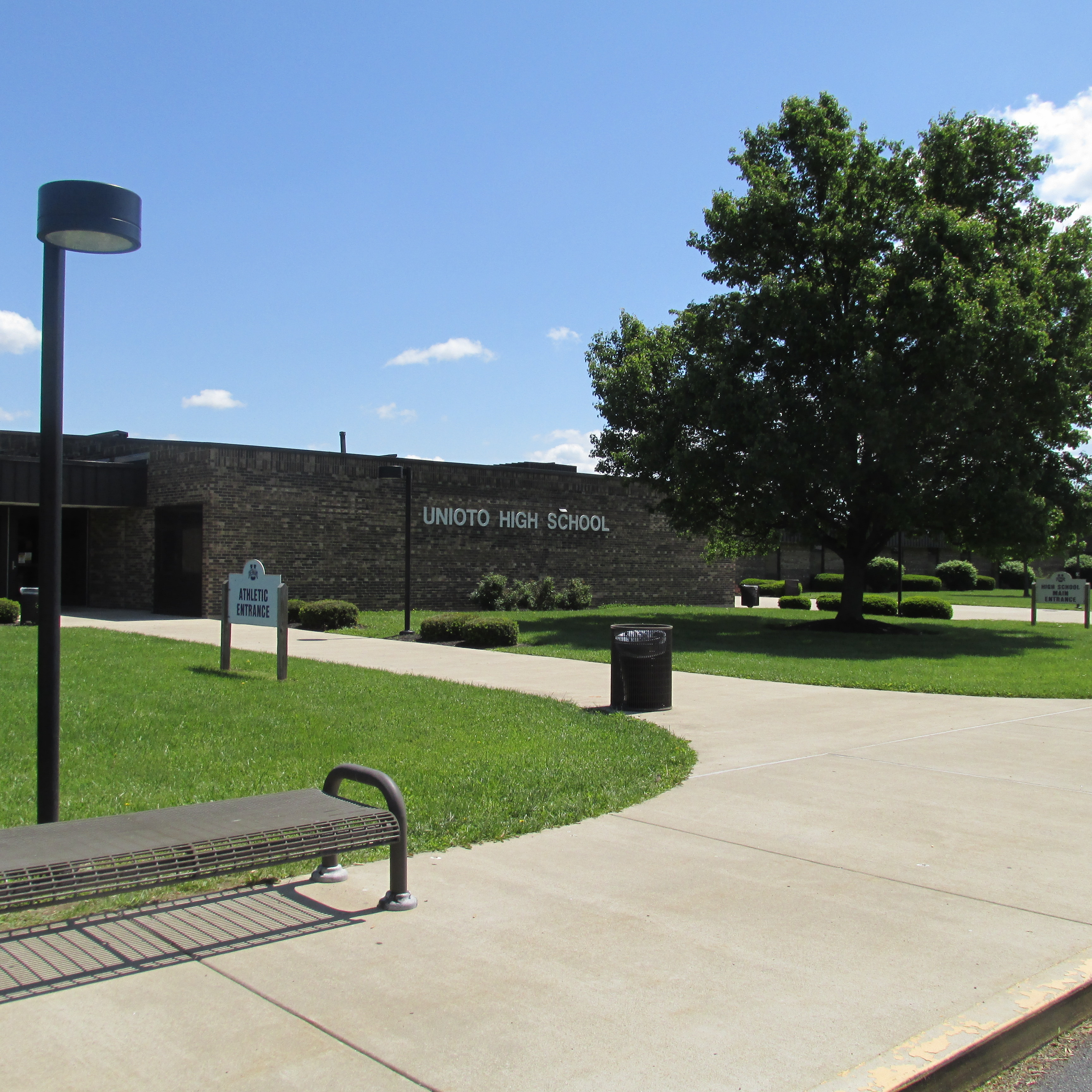

Location
- 14193 Pleasant Valley Road; Chillicothe, (Ross County), Ohio 45601; United States

Information
- Type: Public high school
- Principal: Nathan Caplinger
- Staff: 23.00 (FTE)
- Enrollment: 605 (2023-2024)
- Student to teacher ratio: 26.30
- Colors: Purple and gold
- Athletics conference: Scioto Valley Conference
- Nickname: Sherman Tanks

Unioto High School is a public high school near Chillicothe, Ohio. It is the only high school in the Union-Scioto Local School District. The school colors are purple and gold. The name Unioto is a portmanteau of the two townships that the school district primarily serves in Ross County: Union Township and Scioto Township.

The current high school building is situated on land that was once owned and operated by the United States Senate as Camp Sherman. Camp Sherman operated from 1918 until 1921. Its purpose was to train U.S. Army soldiers for service in France during the First World War.

The school is surrounded today by property still owned by the government. Nearby are the following:

- Chillicothe Correctional Institution
- Ross Correctional Institution
- The Chillicothe Correctional Institutions State Penal Dairy Farm
- The Chillicothe Veterans Administration Hospital
- The Hopewell Culture National Historical Park (Mound City)

== Athletics ==
NFL player, 2002 BCS National champion, Ohio State football player, and sports analyst Ben Hartsock went to school here.

=== Scioto Valley Conference ===
- Bainbridge Paint Valley Bearcats
- Chillicothe Unioto Sherman Tanks
- Chillicothe Zane Trace Pioneers
- Frankfort Adena Warriors
- Chillicothe Huntington Huntsmen
- Piketon Redstreaks
- Chillicothe Southeastern Panthers
- Williamsport Westfall Mustangs

See also Ohio High School Athletic Conferences

=== State-wide success ===
Unioto teams are rivals with the Southeastern Panthers and the Zane Trace Pioneers.

- Girls Basketball

2-time State Runners-up (1987–88, 1989–90), also made one other trip to the State Final Four (1995–96) 5-time District Champions, Sweet Sixteen run in 2022-23

- Boys Basketball

1-time State Runner Up (1991-1992)

- Boys Cross Country

5-time Regional Champions (2004–06, 2010, 2019) 18-time SVC Champions (2001-2013, 2015-2019) 16-time district Champions (2003-2012, 2015-2019) All of this cross-country efforts were coached under Unioto hall of famer Matt Paxton.

- Girls Volleyball

2-time State Final Four Qualifier

- Baseball

3-time State Final Four Qualifier

- Boys Soccer

2-time State Final Four Qualifier (2005, 2021) 3-time State Finals Golf Qualifiers 2012 team sets school record with a 14-game winning streak

- Football

SVC Champions and Gold Ball winners following 9-2 (7-0 SVC) season in 2023. Schedule:

- at Vinton County* - W 21-20
- Amanda-Clearcreek* - W 29-10
- Waverly* - L 14-28
- Westfall - W 48-26
- at Huntington - W 51-0
- Piketon - W 45-22
- at Adena - W 52-0
- Zane Trace (rivalry) - W 27-14
- at Paint Valley - W 45-7
- at Southeastern - W 56-8
- Urbana* (Playoffs) - L 21-56

=== Mr. Hill incident ===
On December 10, 2021, at approximately 8:07 PM Eastern Time, an intoxicated man by the name of Mr. Hill walked on the Unioto basketball court during a game against Zane Trace. The man was escorted out after being put into a bear hug and after assaulting many deputies. He was arrested later that night.

== History ==
The first school house in Union Township was built about 1800, at or near the log house of Mr. Joseph Clark. It was a structure with a puncheon floor and a roof of clapboards with eight-poles laid across to keep them on. The windows were made by cutting out a log for several feet on each side of the house and putting greased paper in the opening. One end of the house was almost entirely appropriated for a fireplace. The seats consisted of split slabs supported by wooden pins. In this manner the school houses were built for a number of years. A school was opened in a log cabin about a mile north of where Andersonville now stands, in 1816 or 1817, the teacher being a man by the name of Perkins. It was afterwards held in a school house on the Inghams’ farm. East of the village. A hewed log house was erected a short distance above Andersonville in 1823, and was used until the brick house in the village was erected. A school house was built at an early date where the Union Church now stands, and another where the upper part of the basin was, in 1814 or 1815, Mr. Young and Mr. Lowery were the teachers. One of the earliest schools was opened on the farm of Thomas Withgott in which Charles McCrea was one of the first teachers. The first school in the Cook neighborhood was kept in a six-cornered, round log school house, as early as 1805 or 1806. Ebeneezer Everts was one of the first school teachers there, teaching several terms. The first school organized under the School Law was the Quaker School, then kept in a hewed log school house.

The one-room school houses of Union and Scioto townships were abandoned at the end of the school year 1935-1936, upon the recommendation of the State Department of Education. A new district was created using the name Union-Scioto Rural School. The school became known as Unioto, a portmanteau of Union and Scioto. A tax levy of 3 ½ mils voted by the district evolved the sum of $50,000 which was matched by another $50,000 from the Federal government under the Public Works Administration and numbered as Project M OH 1021 R. The building site was purchased from Mr. George Garrison, on Egypt Pike, for the sum of $2,000. Construction was started in February 1936, and the building was occupied September 23 of the same year. DeVoss and Donaldson were the architects, McCabe and Proctor were the contractors.

It was thought that colors of purple and gold were adopted at the suggestion of one of the board members whose Chillicothe class colors were purple and gold. The mascot name of “The Shermans” was later adopted when Supt. McMahon, former general in the United States Army, was superintendent of the Unioto School. Since Unioto lies just opposite the former site of World War I Camp Sherman, the suggestion of “The Shermans” was unanimously accepted by the student body. The tank emblem became likewise a fitting symbol for the school.

Unioto High School graduated its first senior class of eight members in May 1937.

Other one-room school houses of the district: The Hurst School, Egypt Pike and Cattail Road; The Roush’s School, Stone Road; The Bowdle School, Morrison and Albright Roads; The Andersonville School, Andersonville Road; The Dunlap School, Route 104; Sulpher Lick School, near Maple Grove Hotel; School at the Ross County Infirmary; Polk Hollow School, Polk Hollow Road; The Steel School, Belleview Hill and Plyley’s Lane; Shady Grove School, Plyley’s Lane; Pleasant Valley School, Pleasant Valley; Frenchtown School, Frenchtown; Tootle School; Springbank School; Bier’s Run School.

=== School construction, renovations; 1937–2023 ===
1936 – School erected on Egypt Pike

1957 – New elementary school, with an addition in 1961

1973 – Intermediate Learning Center erected

1973 – New high school

1995 – Old high school renovated for use as junior high school

2002 – New elementary school

2002 – New junior high school

2002 – New additions to high school

2003 – Demolition to old elementary school

2014 – 6th grade hallway added to the junior high

2017 – Paved football field parking and new field house added by the soccer field

2023 – Brand new track around the football field
