= Southeastern High School (Chillicothe, Ohio) =

High school in Chillicothe, Ohio, United States

Coordinates: 39°16′53″N 82°52′17″W

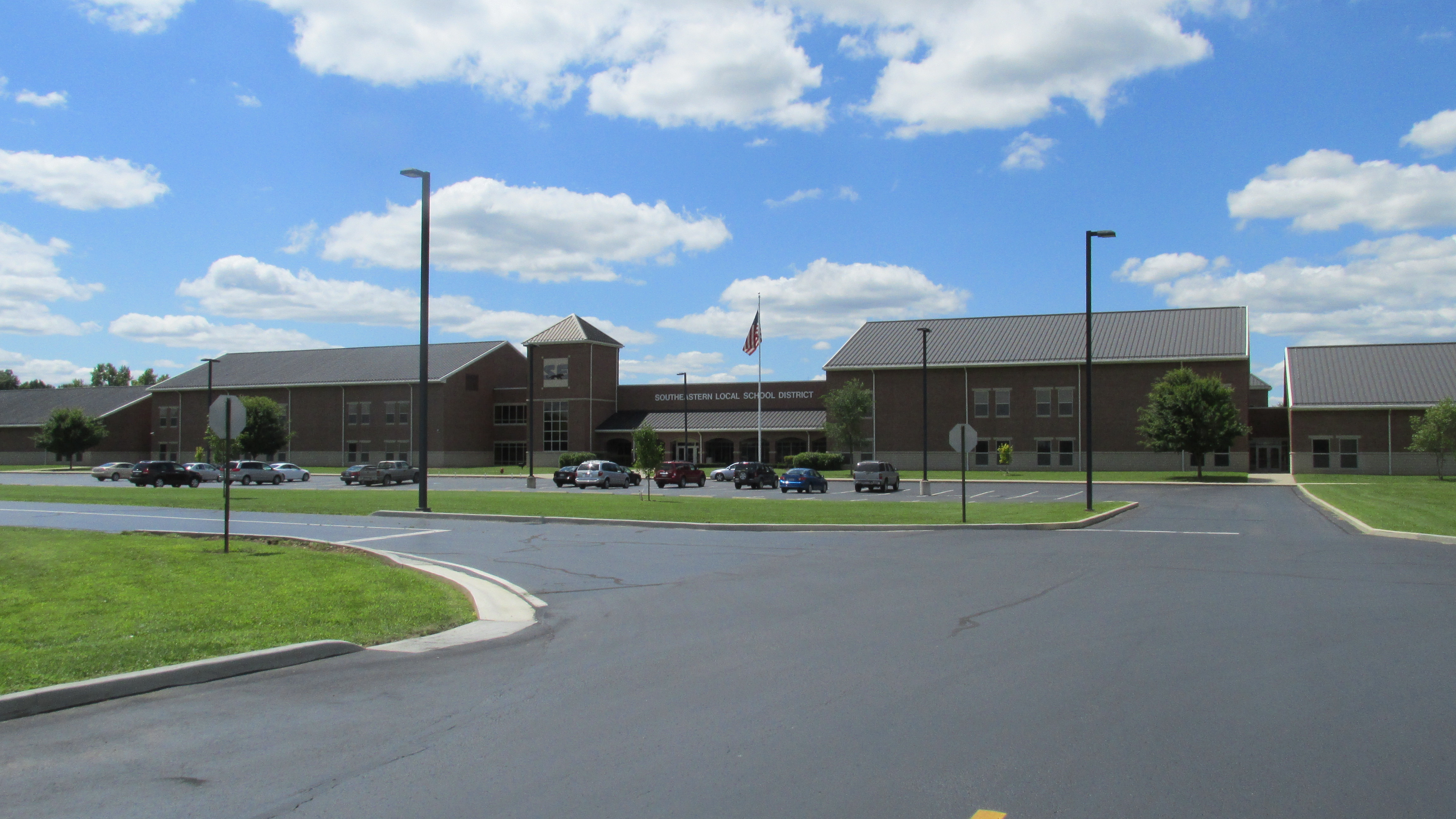

Location
- 2003 Lancaster Road; Chillicothe, (Ross County), Ohio 45601; United States

Information
- Type: Public high school
- Principal: Brian Ruckel
- Staff: 22.70 (FTE)
- Enrollment: 251 (2023-2024)
- Student to teacher ratio: 11.06
- Colors: Blue and white
- Athletics conference: Scioto Valley Conference
- Nickname: Panthers

Southeastern High School is a public high school in Chillicothe, Ohio. It is the only high school in the Southeastern Local School District. Their nickname is the Panthers. They are in the Scioto Valley Conference. The school is located on 2003 Lancaster Road, Chillicothe, Ohio.

== History ==
In October 1935, the district board decided on an expected 12-acre plot on Lancaster Road for the six-year Southeastern rural high school. About a half year later, a new structure for the Southeastern rural high school was selected on April 10, 1936, on the Caldwell Farm at the corner of Higby Road and the Chesapeake & Ohio Railway.

Principal Leonard Steyer
Superintendent Brian Justice

== Athletics ==
=== Scioto Valley Conference ===
- Bainbridge Paint Valley Bearcats
- Chillicothe Unioto Sherman Tanks
- Chillicothe Zane Trace Pioneers
- Frankfort Adena Warriors
- Huntington Ross Huntington Huntsmen
- Piketon Redstreaks
- Richmond Dale/Chillicothe Southeastern Panthers
- Williamsport Westfall Mustangs

See also Ohio High School Athletic Conferences

Their football/track stadium is named R.L. Davisson Memorial Stadium, named after a teacher that taught there.
