= Paint Valley High School =

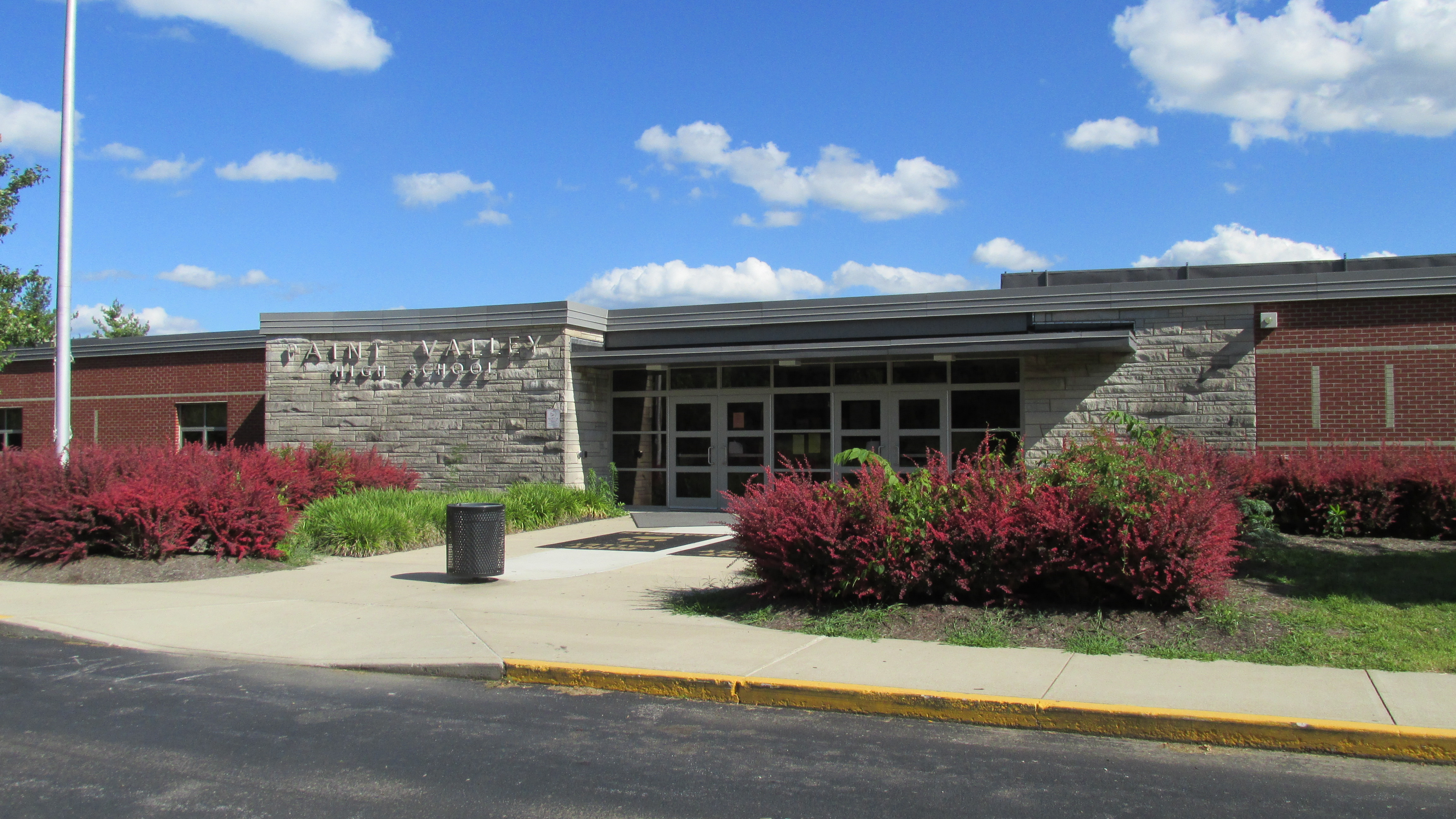
- Paint Valley High School

Location
- 7454 US Highway 50; Bainbridge, Ohio; United States; 39°14′31″N 83°12′52″W

Information
- School type: Public
- Established: 1959
- Principal: Joel Holbert
- Staff: 7.00 (FTE)
- Enrollment: 226 (2023–2024)
- Student to teacher ratio: 32.29
- Colors: Black and Gold
- Website: https://www.paintvalleylocalschools.org/schools/middlehigh-school

Paint Valley High School is a high school located in Bainbridge, Ohio. It is the only high school in the Paint Valley Local School District. The school mascot is the Bearcat. Paint Valley has school clubs such as FCS, NHS, E-Sports, and many more.

Paint Valley High School is the result of centralizing the high schools in both Bainbridge (Paxton and Paint Townships) and Bourneville (Twin Township.) The Bearcat mascot comes from a fusion of the Bainbridge Polar Bears and the Twin Tigers. The original Paint Valley High School was built in 1959. Junior high and vocational agriculture wings were added in 1975. In 1987-88 an arts wing was added. In 2003 Paint Valley combined both Bainbridge and Twin Elementary schools (the former high schools) into a brand new elementary/middle school building located beside the high school. The elementary school formerly known as Twin Elementary was auctioned off and demolished in 2008. Bainbridge elementary had a boiler explosion and was partially demolished in 2006.

== Athletics ==
The Bearcats play in the Scioto Valley conference. The members of that conference are listed below.

- Bainbridge Paint Valley Bearcats
- Chillicothe Unioto Shermans
- Chillicothe Zane Trace Pioneers
- Frankfort Adena Warriors
- Huntington Ross Huntington Huntsmen
- Piketon Redstreaks
- Richmond Dale/Chillicothe Southeastern Panthers
- Williamsport Westfall Mustangs

See also Ohio High School Athletic Conferences

Boys Junior High Football - Undefeated 2009 Coaches; Darrin Stanforth, Mikey Mettler, Mike Thompson, and Dave ("Sal") Salomone.

=== Ohio High School Athletic Association State Championships ===
- Boys Baseball – 1995

== Band ==
The Paint Valley High School Band made its first appearance at OMEA District XVI Adjudicated Event in 2001 under the direction of Sean Brehm where they earned an Excellent (II) rating. In 2017, the band earned a Superior (I) rating at OMEA District XVI AE which qualified them, for the first time in district history, for OMEA State Adjudicated Event. The band earned an Excellent (II) rating at OMEA State AE that year. The year following (2018), the band again qualified for OMEA State Adjudicated Event but this time with Superior (I) ratings from all four District XVI judges. At 2018 OMEA State AE, the Paint Valley High School band earned the district's first ever OMEA State Superior (I) rating.
