= Deerfield Township, Ross County, Ohio =

Township in Ohio, US

- Township
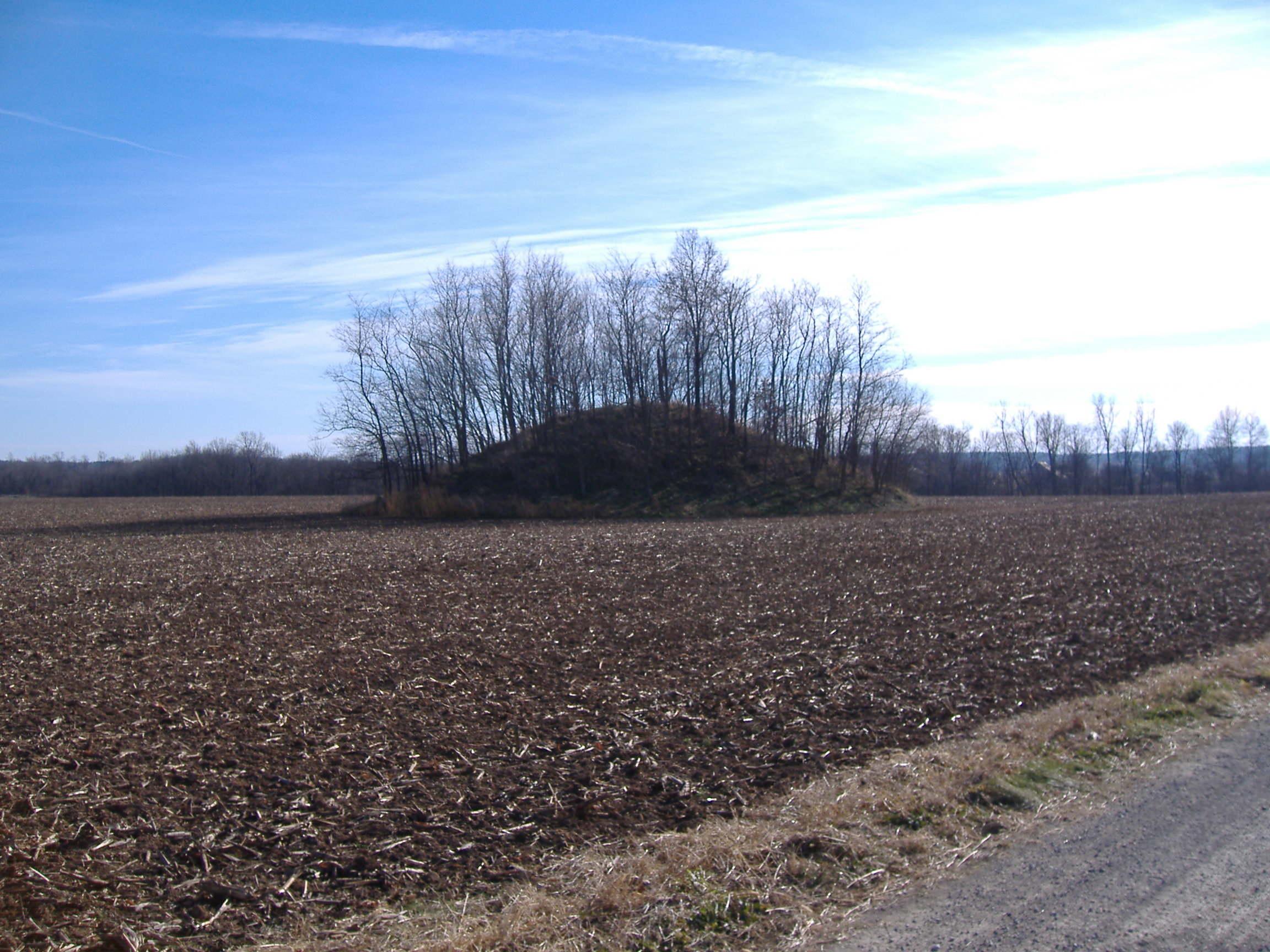
- Austin Brown Mound

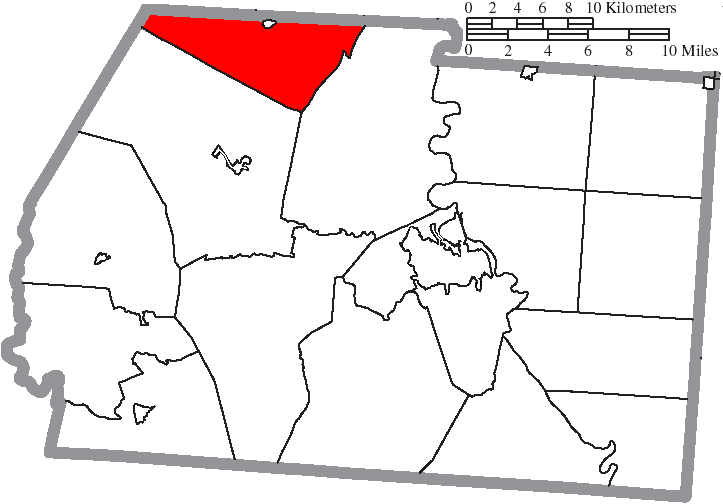
- Location of Deerfield Township in Ross County
- Coordinates: 39°29′52″N 83°9′7″W
- Country: United States
- State: Ohio
- County: Ross

Area
  - Total: 30.8 sq mi (79.7 km^{2})
  - Land: 30.8 sq mi (79.7 km^{2})
  - Water: 0 sq mi (0.0 km^{2})
- Elevation: 732 ft (223 m)

Population (2020)
  - Total: 1,039
  - Density: 33.8/sq mi (13.0/km^{2})
- Time zone: UTC-5 (Eastern (EST))
  - Summer (DST): UTC-4 (EDT)
- FIPS code: 39-21224
- GNIS feature ID: 1086894

Deerfield Township is one of the sixteen townships of Ross County, Ohio, United States. The 2020 census found 1,039 people in the township.

== Geography ==
Located in the northwestern corner of the county, it borders the following townships:

- Perry Township, Pickaway County - north, west of Deer Creek Township
- Deer Creek Township, Pickaway County - north, east of Perry Township
- Wayne Township, Pickaway County - northeast
- Union Township - southeast
- Concord Township - southwest
- Wayne Township, Fayette County - west
- Marion Township, Fayette County - northwest corner

The village of Clarksburg is located in northern Deerfield Township.

== Name and history ==
Statewide, other Deerfield Townships are located in Morgan, Portage, and Warren counties.

== Government ==
The township is governed by a three-member board of trustees, who are elected in November of odd-numbered years to a four-year term beginning on the following January 1. Two are elected in the year after the presidential election and one is elected in the year before it. There is also an elected township fiscal officer, who serves a four-year term beginning on April 1 of the year after the election, which is held in November of the year before the presidential election. Vacancies in the fiscal officership or on the board of trustees are filled by the remaining trustees.
