= Cindy Noble =

American basketball player (born 1958)

Personal information
- Born: November 14, 1958 (age 68) Clarksburg, Ohio, U.S.
- Listed height: 6 ft 5 in (1.96 m)

Career information
- High school: Adena (Frankfort, Ohio)
- College: Tennessee (1978–1981)

Career highlights
- USA Basketball Female Athlete of the Year (1982); Kodak All-American (1981)
- Women's Basketball Hall of Fame
Medals
Women's basketball
Representing the United States
Olympic Games
Gold medal – first place	1984 Los Angeles	Team competition
World Cup
Silver medal – second place	1983 Rio de Janeiro	Team competition
Pan American Games
Gold medal – first place	1983 Caracas	Team competition
Universiade
Gold medal – first place	1979 Mexico City	Team competition
Jones Cup
Gold medal – first place	1984 Taipei	Team competition

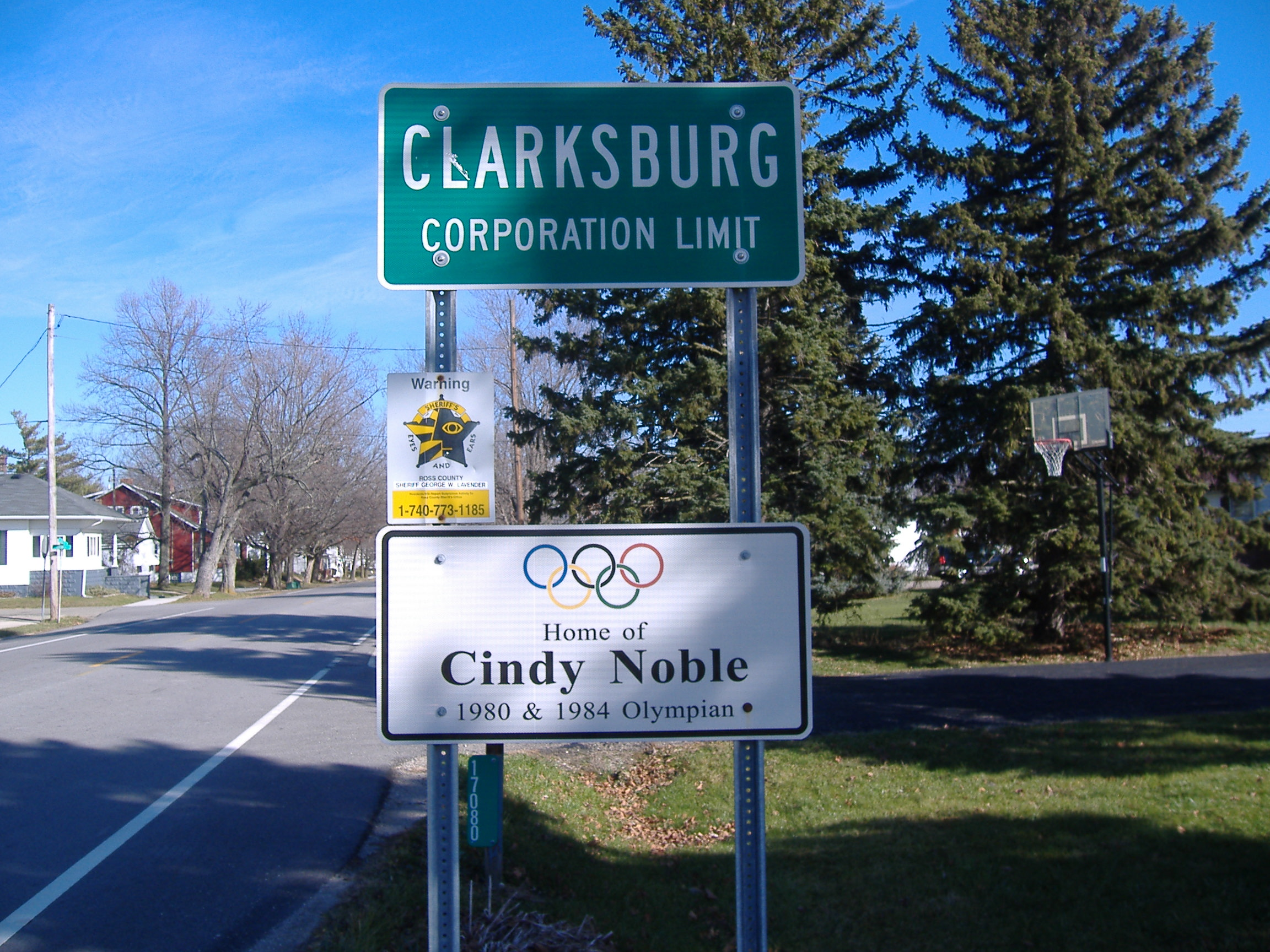
Sign in Clarksburg, Ohio commemorating Cindy Noble's Olympic appearances

Cindy Jo Noble (born November 14, 1958) is an American basketball player who competed for the United States in the 1984 Summer Olympics. In the 1984 Summer Olympics the U.S. women's basketball team won a gold medal. Noble was inducted into the Women's Basketball Hall of Fame in 2000.

Noble was born in Clarksburg, Ohio and attended Adena High School in Frankfort, Ohio and the University of Tennessee. She is 6 feet, 5 inches tall.

== Tennessee statistics ==
Legend
GP	Games played	GS	Games started	MPG	Minutes per game
FG%	Field goal percentage	3P%	3-point field goal percentage	FT%	Free throw percentage
RPG	Rebounds per game	APG	Assists per game	SPG	Steals per game
BPG	Blocks per game	PPG	Points per game	**Bold**	Career high

Year	Team	GP	Points	FG%	FT%	RPG	APG	SPG	BPG	PPG
1978	Tennessee	30	369	48.5%	75.4%	**7.9**	NA	NA	NA	12.3
1979	Tennessee	34	434	58.2%	75.8%	6.2	0.7	1.3	0.5	12.8
1980	Tennessee	**38**	**677**	**67.9%**	**79.7%**	7.6	**0.9**	**1.6**	0.7	**17.8**
1981	Tennessee	31	452	59.7%	73.8%	7.4	0.7	1.5	**1.5**	14.6
Career		133	1932	59.0%	76.7%	7.3	0.6	1.1	0.7	14.5

== USA Basketball ==
Noble was named to the team representing the US at the 1979 World University Games, held in Mexico City, Mexico. The USA team won all seven games to take the gold medal. The USA team played and beat Cuba twice, the team that had defeated them at the Pan Am games. Noble averaged 7.0 points per game.

Noble was selected to be a member of the team representing the US at the 1980 Olympics, but the team did not go, due to the 1980 Olympic boycott. The team did go 6–1 in Olympic Qualifying games, with Noble scoring 13.8 points per game, the second-most on the team. She led the team in rebounding, with 6.7 per game. In 2007 Noble did, however, receive one of 461 Congressional Gold Medals created especially for the spurned athletes.

Noble was selected to be a member of the team representing the US at the 1983 Pan American Games held in Caracas, Venezuela. The team won all five games to earn the gold medal for the event. Noble averaged 3.8 points per game.

Noble played for the USA national team in the 1983 World Championships, held in Sao Paulo, Brazil. The team won six games but lost two against the Soviet Union. In an opening-round game, the USA team had a nine-point lead at halftime, but the Soviets came back to take the lead, and a final shot by the USA failed to drop, leaving the USSR team with a one-point victory 85–84. The USA team won their next four games, setting up the gold medal game against USSR. This game was also close and was tied at 82 points each with six seconds to go in the game. The Soviets Elena Chausova received the inbound's pass and hit the game-winning shot in the final seconds, giving the USSR team the gold medal with a score of 84–82. The USA team earned the silver medal. Noble averaged 3.9 points per game.

In 1984, the USA sent its national team to the 1984 William Jones Cup competition in Taipei, Taiwan, for pre-Olympic practice. The team easily beat each of the eight teams they played, winning by an average of just under 50 points per game. Noble averaged 5.5 points per game.

She continued with the national team to represent the US at the 1984 Olympics. The team won all six games to claim the gold medal. Noble averaged 8.7 points per game.
