= Adena High School =

School in Ohio, United States

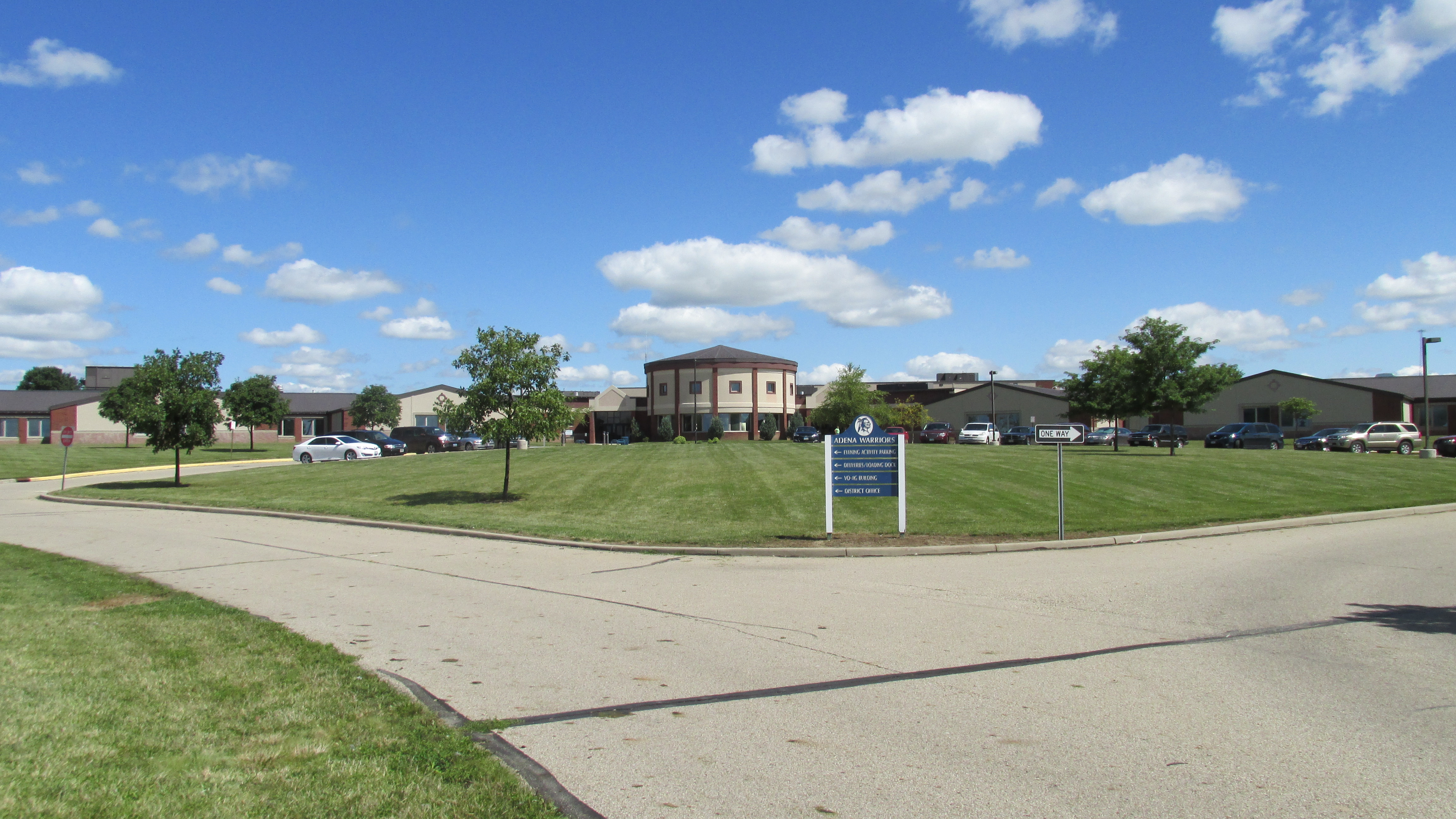

Location
- 3367 County Road 550; Frankfort, Ohio; United States
- Coordinates: 39.416°N 83.194°W

Information
- NCES School ID: 390494903611
- Staff: 19.00 (FTE)
- Gender: Co-educational
- Enrollment: 306 (2023–2024)
- Student to teacher ratio: 16.11
- Color
- Team name: Warriors
- Website: adena.k12.oh.us

Adena High School is a public high school located in Frankfort, Ohio. It is the only high school in the Adena Local School District.

== Athletics ==
=== Scioto Valley Conference ===
- Bainbridge Paint Valley Bearcats
- Chillicothe Unioto Shermans
- Kinnikinnick Zane Trace Pioneers
- Frankfort Adena Warriors
- Huntington Ross Huntington Huntsmen
- Piketon Redstreaks
- Richmond Dale/Londonderry Southeastern Panthers
- Williamsport Westfall Mustangs

See also Ohio High School Athletic Conferences

=== Ohio High School Athletic Association State Championships ===
- Boys Track and Field - 1972
- Girls Track and Field - 1975
- Girls Basketball – 1976, 1994
- Girls Volleyball – 1975, 1976
