= Deer Creek Township, Ohio =

Deer Creek Township, Ohio, may refer to:

- Deer Creek Township, Madison County, Ohio
- Deer Creek Township, Pickaway County, Ohio
