= Wayne Township, Pickaway County, Ohio =

Township in Ohio, US

- Township
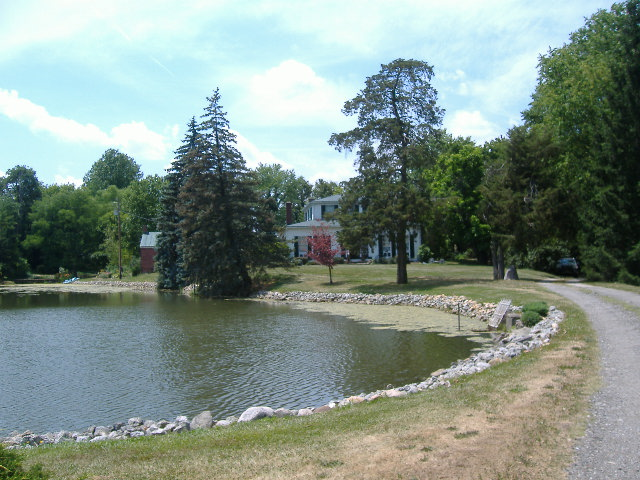
- The Horsey-Barthelmas Farm, a historic site in the township

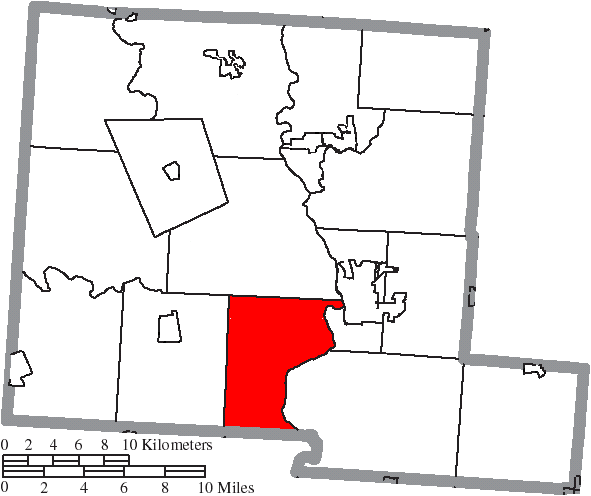
- Location of Wayne Township in Pickaway County
- Coordinates: 39°33′30″N 83°0′1″W
- Country: United States
- State: Ohio
- County: Pickaway

Area
  - Total: 27.1 sq mi (70.3 km^{2})
  - Land: 26.9 sq mi (69.7 km^{2})
  - Water: 0.23 sq mi (0.6 km^{2})
- Elevation: 725 ft (221 m)

Population (2020)
  - Total: 427
  - Density: 16/sq mi (6.1/km^{2})
- Time zone: UTC-5 (Eastern (EST))
  - Summer (DST): UTC-4 (EDT)
- FIPS code: 39-82264
- GNIS feature ID: 1086806

Wayne Township is one of the fifteen townships of Pickaway County, Ohio, United States. The 2020 census found 427 people in the township.

== Geography ==
Located in the southern part of the county, it borders the following townships:

- Jackson Township - north
- Circleville Township - northeast
- Pickaway Township - southeast
- Union Township, Ross County - south
- Deerfield Township, Ross County - southwest
- Deer Creek Township - west

No municipalities are located in Wayne Township.

== Name and history ==
It is one of twenty Wayne Townships statewide.

== Government ==
The township is governed by a three-member board of trustees, who are elected in November of odd-numbered years to a four-year term beginning on the following January 1. Two are elected in the year after the presidential election and one is elected in the year before it. There is also an elected township fiscal officer, who serves a four-year term beginning on April 1 of the year after the election, which is held in November of the year before the presidential election. Vacancies in the fiscal officership or on the board of trustees are filled by the remaining trustees.
