= Jackson Township, Pickaway County, Ohio =

Township in Ohio, US

- Township
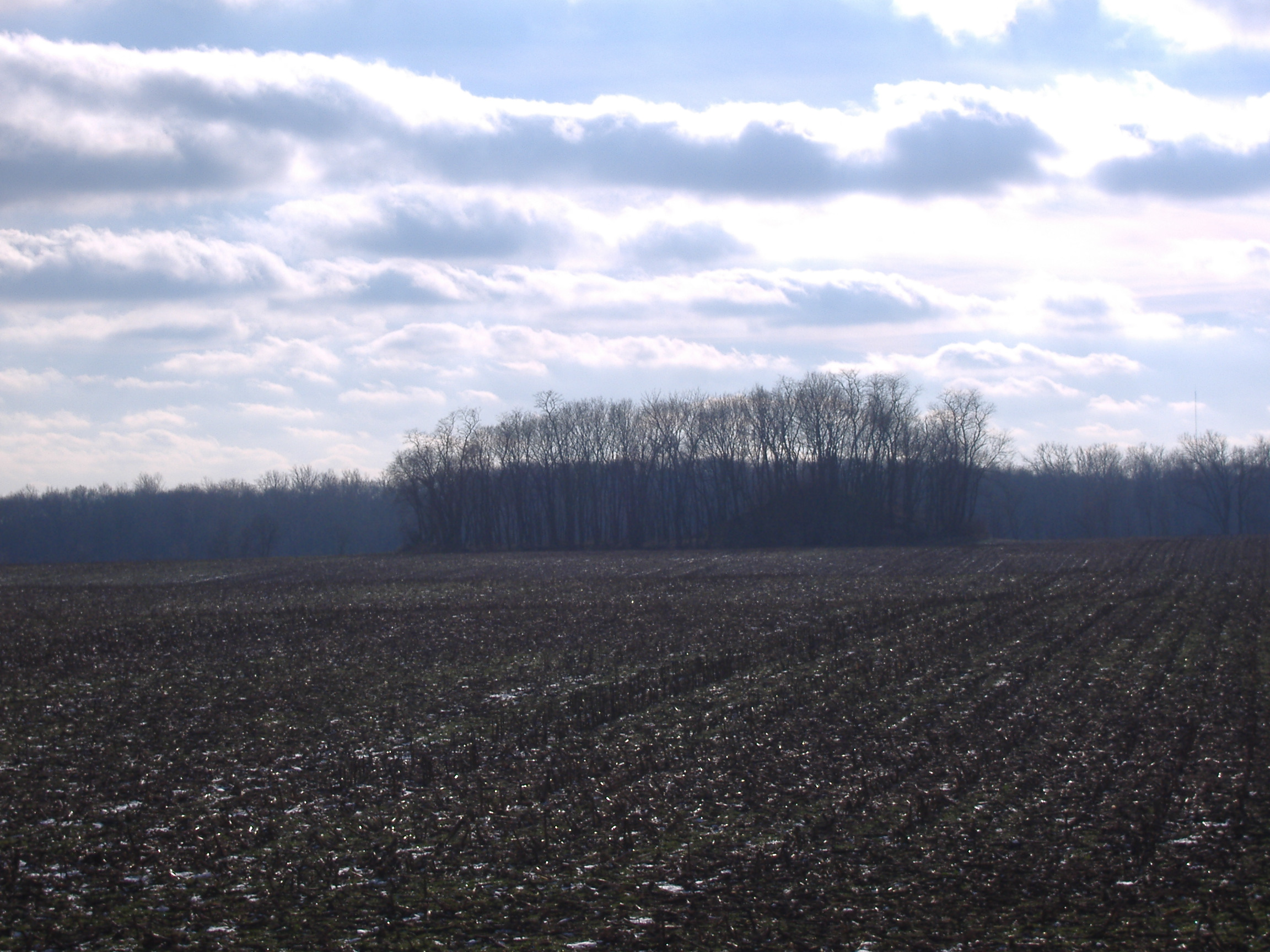
- The W.C. Clemmons Mound, a historic site in the township

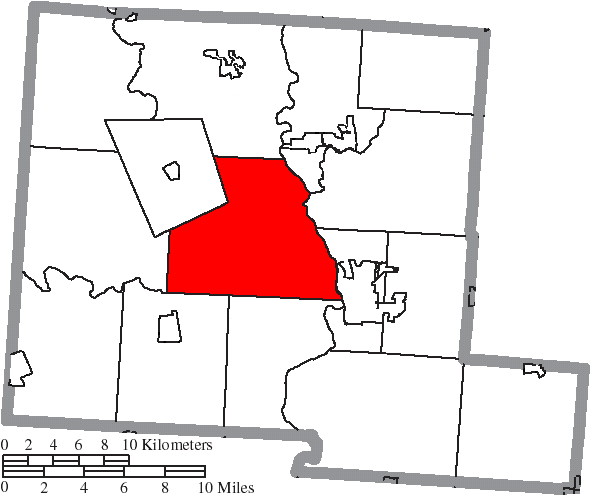
- Location of Jackson Township in Pickaway County
- Coordinates: 39°39′41″N 83°1′26″W
- Country: United States
- State: Ohio
- County: Pickaway

Area
  - Total: 42.6 sq mi (110.4 km^{2})
  - Land: 42.5 sq mi (110.0 km^{2})
  - Water: 0.15 sq mi (0.4 km^{2})
- Elevation: 719 ft (219 m)

Population (2020)
  - Total: 1,098
  - Density: 26/sq mi (10/km^{2})
- Time zone: UTC-5 (Eastern (EST))
  - Summer (DST): UTC-4 (EDT)
- FIPS code: 39-37982
- GNIS feature ID: 1086796
- Website: https://jacksontwppickawayco.org/

Jackson Township is one of the fifteen townships of Pickaway County, Ohio, United States. The 2020 census found 1,098 people in the township.

== Geography ==
Located in the center of the county, it borders the following townships:

- Scioto Township - north
- Harrison Township - northeast
- Walnut Township - east
- Circleville Township - southeast
- Wayne Township - south
- Deer Creek Township - southwest
- Monroe Township - west
- Muhlenberg Township - northwest

No municipalities are located in Jackson Township.

== Name and history ==
It is one of thirty-seven Jackson Townships statewide.

== Government ==
The township is governed by a three-member board of trustees, who are elected in November of odd-numbered years to a four-year term beginning on the following January 1. Two are elected in the year after the presidential election and one is elected in the year before it. There is also an elected township fiscal officer, who serves a four-year term beginning on April 1 of the year after the election, which is held in November of the year before the presidential election. Vacancies in the fiscal officership or on the board of trustees are filled by the remaining trustees.
