= Perry Township, Pickaway County, Ohio =

Township in Ohio, US

- Township
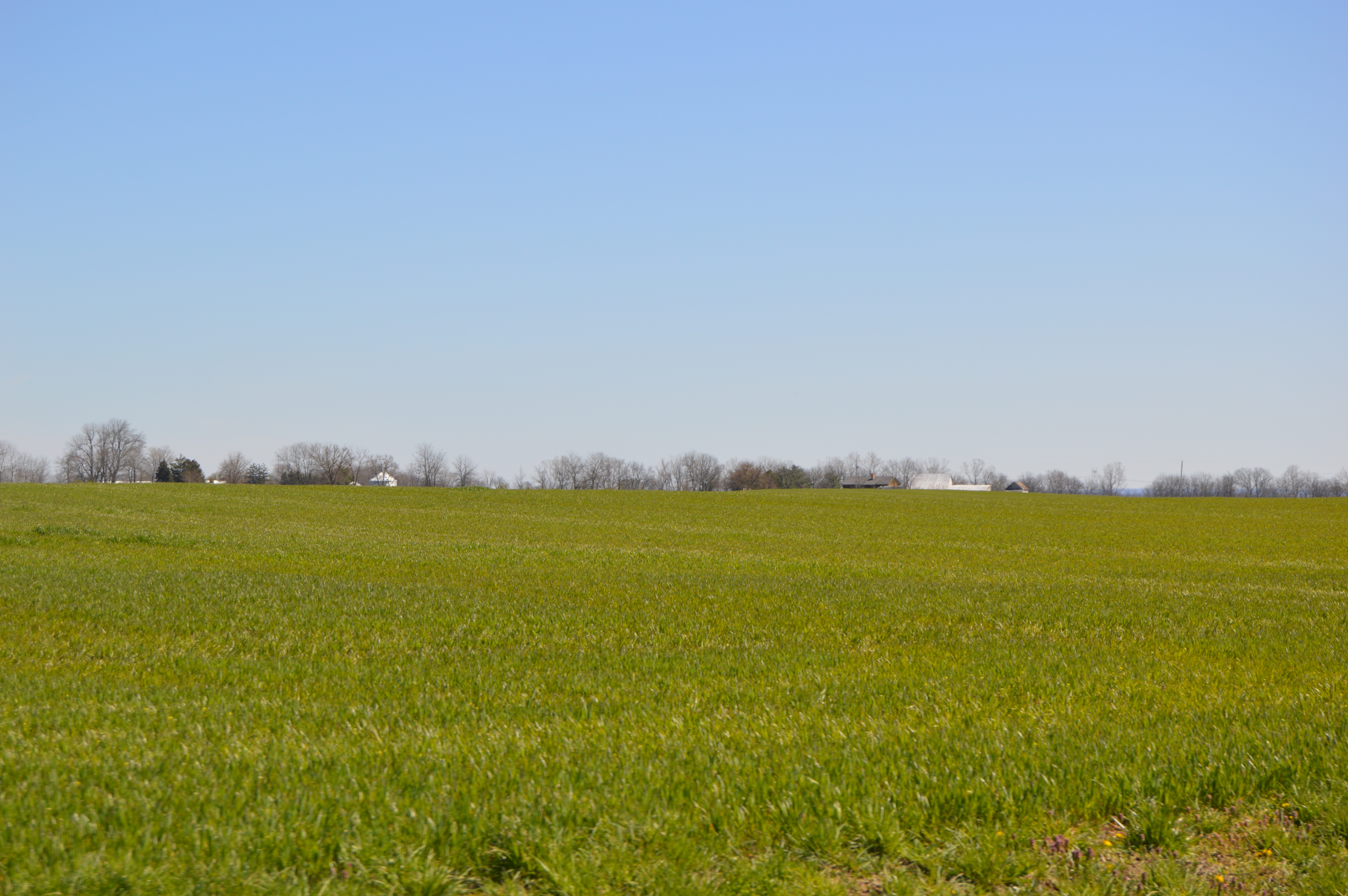
- Fields southeast of New Holland

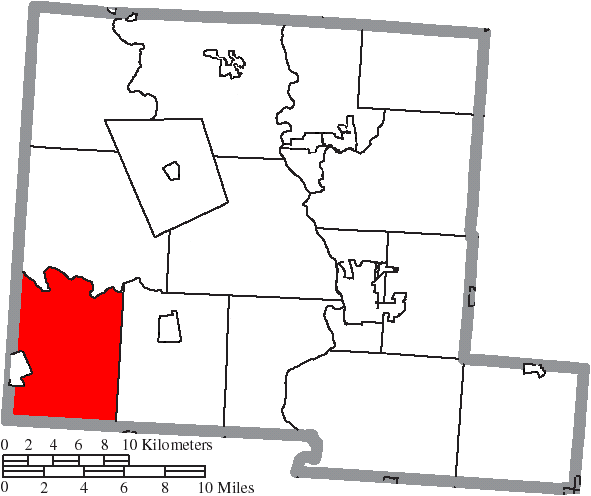
- Location of Perry Township in Pickaway County
- Coordinates: 39°33′22″N 83°13′42″W
- Country: United States
- State: Ohio
- County: Pickaway

Area
  - Total: 37.7 sq mi (97.7 km^{2})
  - Land: 36.8 sq mi (95.3 km^{2})
  - Water: 0.97 sq mi (2.5 km^{2})
- Elevation: 860 ft (262 m)

Population (2020)
  - Total: 1,253
  - Density: 34/sq mi (13.1/km^{2})
- Time zone: UTC-5 (Eastern (EST))
  - Summer (DST): UTC-4 (EDT)
- FIPS code: 39-62008
- GNIS feature ID: 1086800

Perry Township is one of the fifteen townships of Pickaway County, Ohio, United States. The 2020 census found 1,253 people in the township.

== Geography ==
Located in the southwestern corner of the county, it borders the following townships:

- Monroe Township - north
- Deer Creek Township - east
- Deerfield Township, Ross County - south
- Wayne Township, Fayette County - southwest corner
- Marion Township, Fayette County - west
- Madison Township, Fayette County - northwest

Part of the village of New Holland is located in western Perry Township.

== Name and history ==
It is one of twenty-six Perry Townships statewide.

== Government ==
The township is governed by a three-member board of trustees, who are elected in November of odd-numbered years to a four-year term beginning on the following January 1. Two are elected in the year after the presidential election and one is elected in the year before it. There is also an elected township fiscal officer, who serves a four-year term beginning on April 1 of the year after the election, which is held in November of the year before the presidential election. Vacancies in the fiscal officership or on the board of trustees are filled by the remaining trustees.
