= Ben Hartsock =

American football player (born 1980)

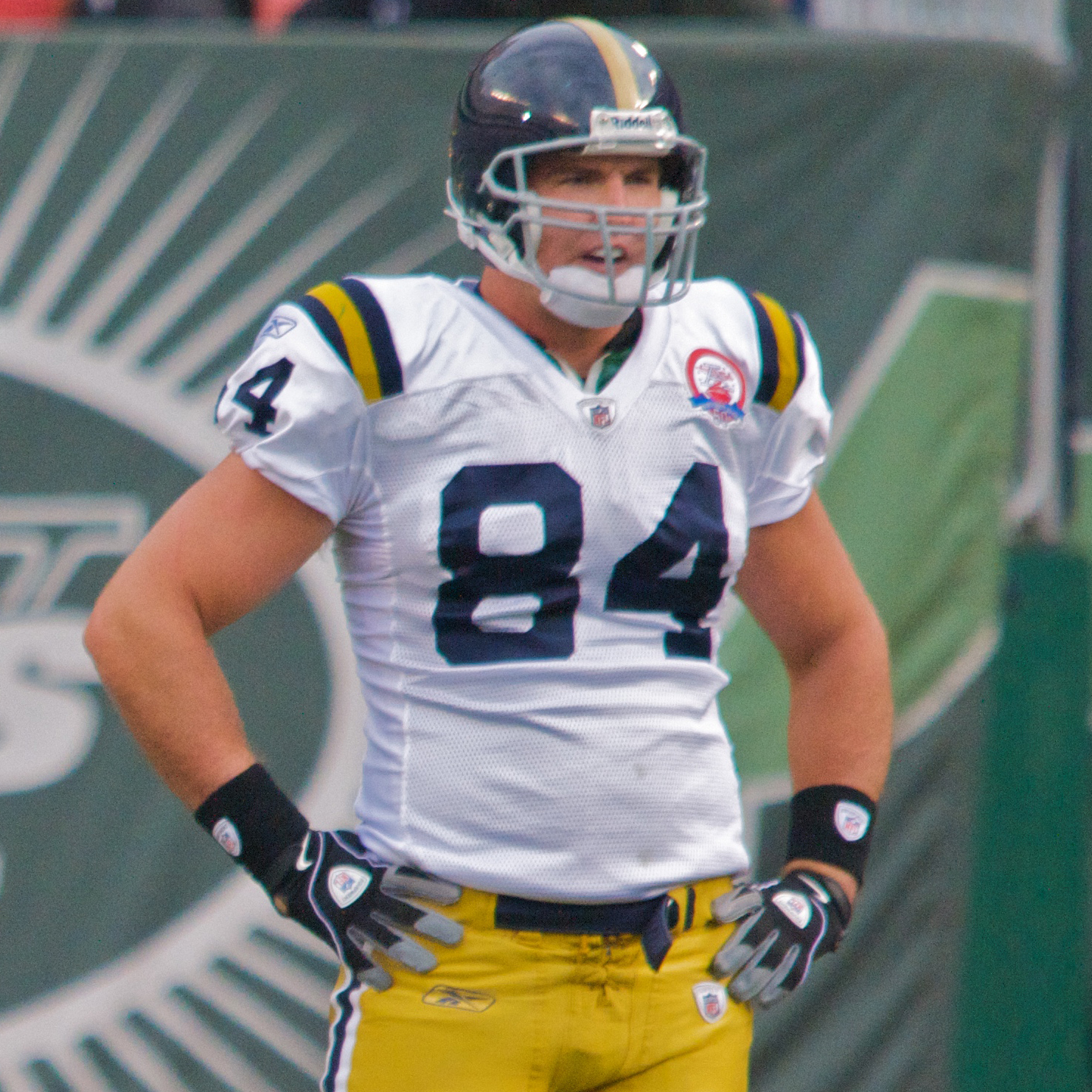
- Hartsock with the New York Jets in 2009

No. 80, 47, 88, 89, 84
- Position: Tight end

Personal information
- Born: July 5, 1980 (age 46); Chillicothe, Ohio, U.S.
- Listed height: 6 ft 4 in (1.93 m)
- Listed weight: 265 lb (120 kg)

Career information
- High school: Unioto (Chillicothe)
- College: Ohio State
- NFL draft: 2004: 3rd round, 68th overall pick

Career history
- Indianapolis Colts (2004–2006); Tennessee Titans (2006–2007); Atlanta Falcons (2008); New York Jets (2009–2010); Carolina Panthers (2011–2013); New England Patriots (2014)*
- * Offseason or practice squad member only

Awards and highlights
- BCS national champion (2002); First-team All-Big Ten (2003)

Career NFL statistics
- Receptions: 31
- Receiving yards: 312
- Receiving touchdowns: 1
- Stats at Pro Football Reference

Benjamin Richard Hartsock (born July 5, 1980) is an American former professional football player who was a tight end in the National Football League (NFL). He played college football for the Ohio State Buckeyes and was selected by the Indianapolis Colts in the third round of the 2004 NFL draft.

Hartsock also played in the NFL for the Tennessee Titans, Atlanta Falcons, New York Jets, and Carolina Panthers during his NFL career. Since retiring he has worked as a color analyst for pro and college football on Fox Sports Radio and ESPN Radio.

== Early life ==
Hartsock attended Unioto High School in Chillicothe, Ohio, where he caught 86 passes for 1562 yards (18.16 yards reception). He also played running back, placekicker, and linebacker. Hartsock recorded 61 tackles, and 19 quarterback sacks during his senior season, after switching from linebacker to defensive end. Hartsock was a three-year captain and four-year letter winner. Hartsock committed to play at Ohio State University during his senior year of high school.

== College career ==
Hartsock attended the Ohio State University, where he played tight end. He was a three-time Academic All-Big Ten Conference honoree and won CoSIDA Academic All-American honors as a junior.

During his college career, Hartsock started 31 of 51 games played and had 58 receptions for 519 yards (8.9 yards per reception). Hartsock recorded 33 catches for 290 yards and 2 touchdowns) in his senior year. As a junior, he was a contributor for the 2002 Ohio State Buckeyes football team, which defeated the Miami Hurricanes in the Fiesta Bowl, winning the BCS National Championship.

== Professional career ==
=== Indianapolis Colts ===
Hartsock was selected in the third round with the 68th overall pick of the 2004 NFL draft by the Indianapolis Colts. He was a reserve tight end in his time with the Colts, playing behind Marcus Pollard and Dallas Clark.

=== Tennessee Titans ===
In 2006, Hartsock signed with the Colts' division rival, the Tennessee Titans. He started 12 games, compiling 206 yards receiving in two years at tight end for Tennessee. The Titans lost Hartsock to unrestricted free agency in March 2008.

=== Atlanta Falcons ===
On March 2, 2008, the Atlanta Falcons came to an agreement with Hartsock. He was released on September 1, 2009.

=== New York Jets ===
Hartsock was signed by the New York Jets on September 2, 2009, to a one-year $1.2 million contract. Hartsock recorded his first career touchdown on a two-yard pass from Jets quarterback Mark Sanchez against his former team, the Tennessee Titans, in September 2009.

Hartsock was re-signed by the team to a two-year contract in March 2010. On March 2, 2011, Hartsock was released by the Jets after spending the past two seasons with the team primarily as a blocker.

=== Carolina Panthers ===
Hartsock signed a two-year contract with the Carolina Panthers on July 27, 2011.

=== New England Patriots ===
On August 10, 2014, Hartsock was signed by the New England Patriots. He was released just four days later, on August 14.

== Personal life ==
Hartsock is a Christian. He married his high school sweetheart, Amy Lykowski, in 2003, and they have two daughters, Whitney and Lindsey.
