= Monroe Township, Pickaway County, Ohio =

Township in Ohio, US

- Township
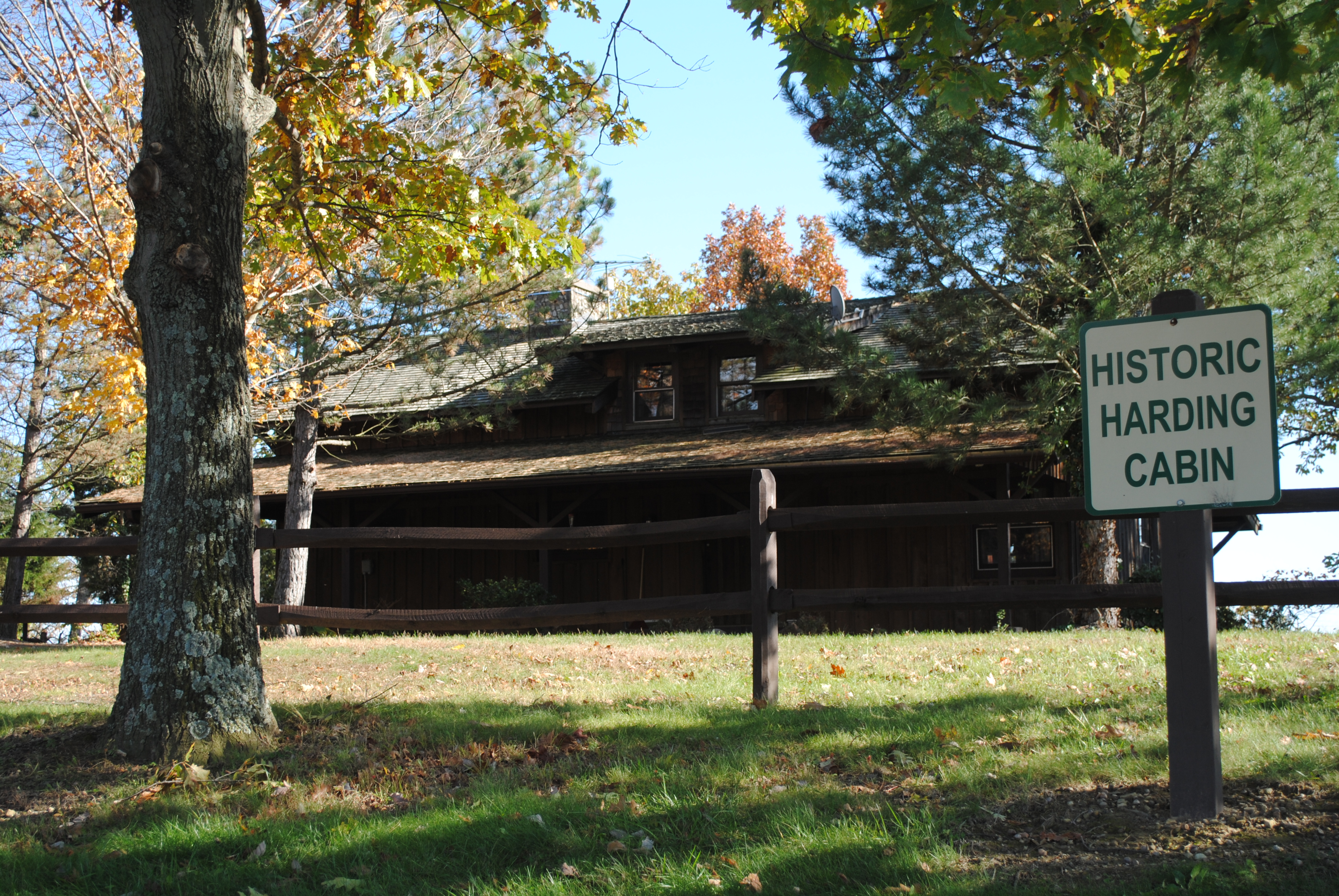
- The Shack (the Harry M. Daugherty cabin), a historic site in the township

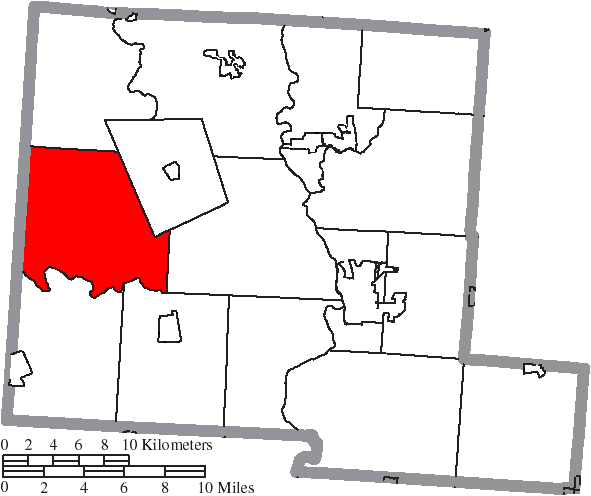
- Location of Monroe Township in Pickaway County
- Coordinates: 39°39′32″N 83°11′13″W
- Country: United States
- State: Ohio
- County: Pickaway

Area
  - Total: 41.5 sq mi (107.6 km^{2})
  - Land: 40.3 sq mi (104.5 km^{2})
  - Water: 1.2 sq mi (3.0 km^{2})
- Elevation: 958 ft (292 m)

Population (2020)
  - Total: 1,250
  - Density: 31/sq mi (12/km^{2})
- Time zone: UTC-5 (Eastern (EST))
  - Summer (DST): UTC-4 (EDT)
- FIPS code: 39-51534
- GNIS feature ID: 1086798
- Website: https://www.monroetownshipohio.com/

Monroe Township is one of the fifteen townships of Pickaway County, Ohio, United States. The 2020 census found 1,250 people in the township.

== Geography ==
Located in the western part of the county, it borders the following townships:

- Darby Township - north
- Muhlenberg Township - northeast
- Jackson Township - east
- Deer Creek Township - southeast
- Perry Township - south
- Madison Township, Fayette County - southwest
- Pleasant Township, Madison County - northwest

No municipalities are located in Monroe Township.

== Name and history ==
It is one of twenty-two Monroe Townships statewide.

== Government ==
The township is governed by a three-member board of trustees, who are elected in November of odd-numbered years to a four-year term beginning on the following January 1. Two are elected in the year after the presidential election and one is elected in the year before it. There is also an elected township fiscal officer, who serves a four-year term beginning on April 1 of the year after the election, which is held in November of the year before the presidential election. Vacancies in the fiscal officership or on the board of trustees are filled by the remaining trustees.
