= Austin Brown Mound =

Archaeological site in Ohio, United States

- U.S. National Register of Historic Places
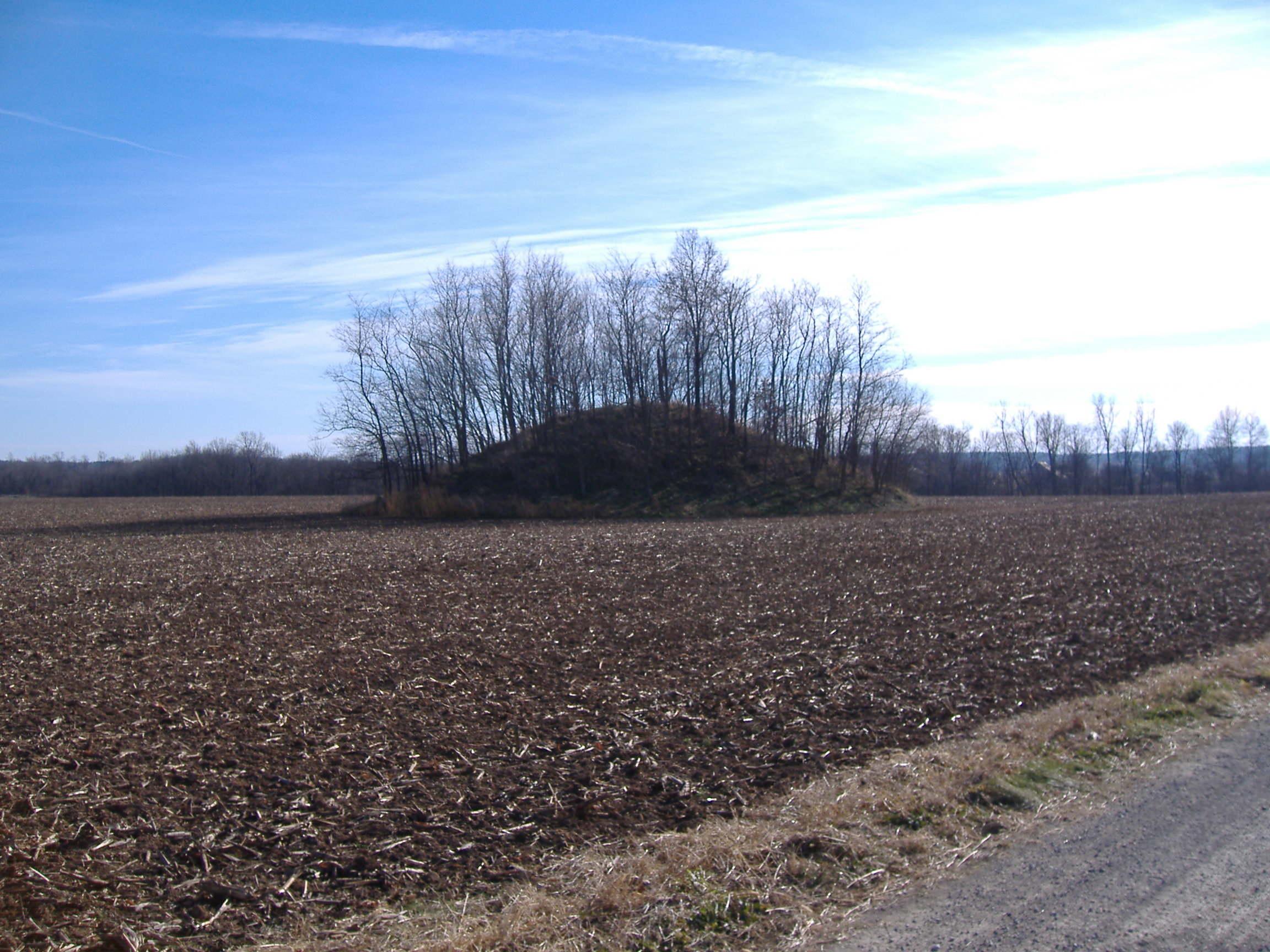
- Roadside view
- Nearest city: Chillicothe, Ohio
- Area: 0.5 acres (0.20 ha)
- NRHP reference No.: 74001613
- Added to NRHP: February 15, 1974

The Austin Brown Mound, also known as the "Dwight Fullerton Mound," is a subconical Native American mound located northwest of the city of Chillicothe in Ross County, Ohio, United States. In 1897, the Ohio Historical Society sponsored an excavation of the mound under the leadership of Clarence Loveberry, who oversaw the digging of a large tunnel into the mound's side. Loveberry's investigation yielded artifacts of the Adena culture and evidence of rotten logs on the floor of the mound, but in publishing the results of his excavation, he observed that neither a tomb nor any isolated burials were discovered within the mound. Since 1897, other Adena mounds have been excavated and shown to have wooden tombs in off-center locations, presumably to complicate the efforts of those who would loot the mounds; accordingly, it is possible that the Brown mound likewise has an off-center tomb.

Despite the Loveberry excavation, the Brown mound remains one of the most important Adena mounds in Ohio. It is one of the largest known Adena mounds, and it has been damaged less than almost every other large Adena mound; accordingly, it is a highly valuable archaeological site. In recognition of its archaeological value, the Austin Brown Mound was listed on the National Register of Historic Places in 1974. It is one of eighteen archaeological sites on the Register in Ross County; among the other seventeen is the Charles Metzger Mound, another Adena mound in the close vicinity of the Brown mound.
