= Deer Creek Township, Pickaway County, Ohio =

Township in Ohio, US

- Township
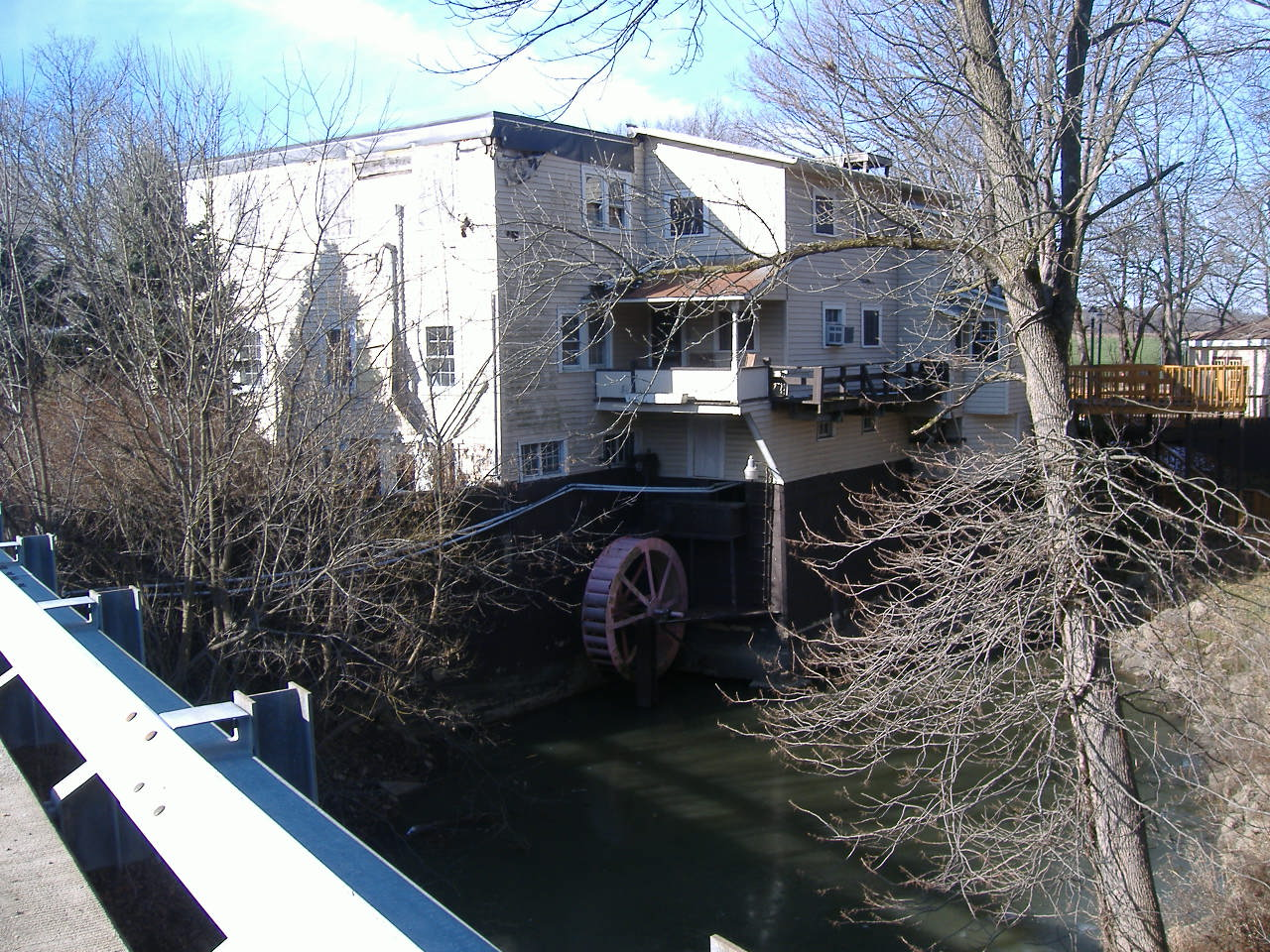
- Bazore Mill, a historic site in the township

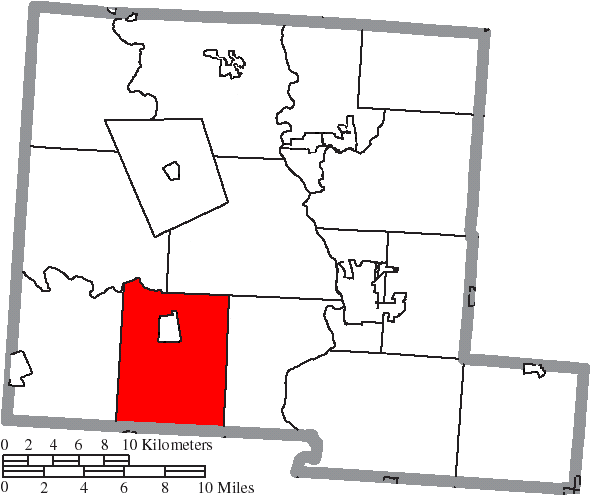
- Location of Deer Creek Township in Pickaway County
- Coordinates: 39°34′1″N 83°7′0″W
- Country: United States
- State: Ohio
- County: Pickaway

Area
  - Total: 36.3 sq mi (93.9 km^{2})
  - Land: 36.3 sq mi (93.9 km^{2})
  - Water: 0 sq mi (0.0 km^{2})
- Elevation: 761 ft (232 m)

Population (2020)
  - Total: 1,613
  - Density: 44.5/sq mi (17.2/km^{2})
- Time zone: UTC-5 (Eastern (EST))
  - Summer (DST): UTC-4 (EDT)
- FIPS code: 39-21168
- GNIS feature ID: 1086794

Deer Creek Township is one of the fifteen townships of Pickaway County, Ohio, United States. The 2020 census found 1,613 people in the township.

== Geography ==
Located in the southwestern part of the county, it borders the following townships:

- Jackson Township - northeast
- Wayne Township - east
- Deerfield Township, Ross County - south
- Perry Township - west
- Monroe Township - northwest

The village of Williamsport is located in northern Deer Creek Township.

== Name and history ==
Statewide, the only other Deer Creek Township is located in Madison County.

Deer Creek Township was named for the creek that runs through it. In the 1830s, there were two gristmills and two saw mills located on the creek.

== Government ==
The township is governed by a three-member board of trustees, who are elected in November of odd-numbered years to a four-year term beginning on the following January 1. Two are elected in the year after the presidential election and one is elected in the year before it. There is also an elected township fiscal officer, who serves a four-year term beginning on April 1 of the year after the election, which is held in November of the year before the presidential election. Vacancies in the fiscal officership or on the board of trustees are filled by the remaining trustees.
