= Williamsport, Ohio =

- Village
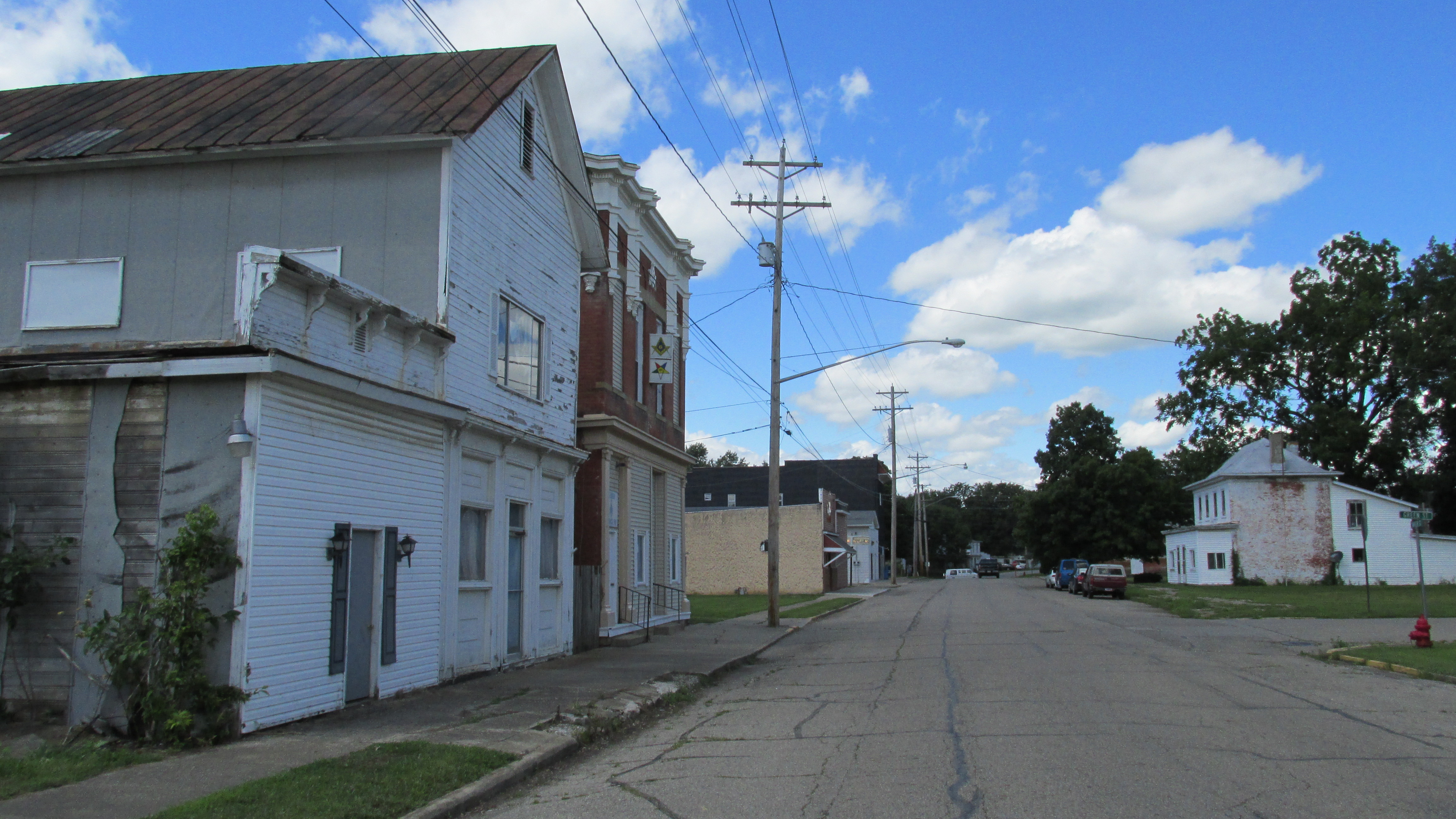
- Water Street

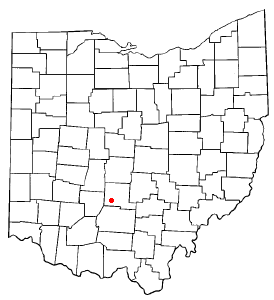
- Location of Williamsport, Ohio

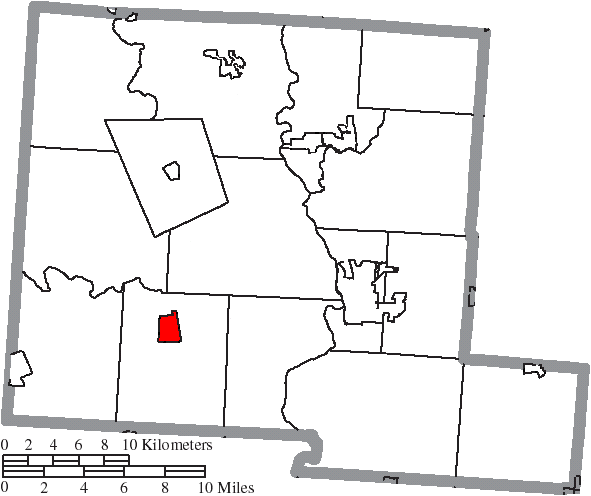
- Location of Williamsport in Pickaway County
- Coordinates: 39°34′55″N 83°07′28″W
- Country: United States
- State: Ohio
- County: Pickaway
- Township: Deer Creek

Area
  - Total: 1.80 sq mi (4.67 km^{2})
  - Land: 1.78 sq mi (4.60 km^{2})
  - Water: 0.031 sq mi (0.08 km^{2})
- Elevation: 768 ft (234 m)

Population (2020)
  - Total: 970
  - Density: 546.4/sq mi (210.97/km^{2})
- Time zone: UTC-5 (Eastern (EST))
  - Summer (DST): UTC-4 (EDT)
- ZIP code: 43164
- Area code: 740
- FIPS code: 39-85414
- GNIS feature ID: 2399697
- Website: https://www.williamsportoh.org/

Williamsport is a village in Pickaway County, Ohio, United States. The population was 970 at the 2020 census.

== History ==
In 2022, the village blocked the development of the 400-megawatt Chipmunk Solar project, which would have become one of the largest renewable energy projects in the United States. With the cancellation of the solar power array, the village lost an estimated $3.6 million per year in tax revenue (most of which was intended for public schools).

== Geography ==
According to the United States Census Bureau, the village has a total area of 1.84 square miles (4.77 km^{2}), of which 1.81 square miles (4.69 km^{2}) is land and 0.03 square miles (0.08 km^{2}) is water.

== Demographics ==
Historical population
Census	Pop.	Note	%±
1870	514		—
1880	313		−39.1%
1890	368		17.6%
1900	547		48.6%
1910	536		−2.0%
1920	554		3.4%
1930	524		−5.4%
1940	605		15.5%
1950	631		4.3%
1960	840		33.1%
1970	857		2.0%
1980	792		−7.6%
1990	851		7.4%
2000	1,002		17.7%
2010	1,023		2.1%
2020	970		−5.2%
U.S. Decennial Census

=== 2010 census ===
As of the census of 2010, there were 1,023 people, 342 households, and 272 families living in the village. The population density was 565.2 inhabitants per square mile (218.2/km^{2}). There were 377 housing units at an average density of 208.3 per square mile (80.4/km^{2}). The racial makeup of the village was 97.7% White, 0.3% African American, 0.2% Native American, 0.2% from other races, and 1.7% from two or more races. Hispanic or Latino people of any race were 0.3% of the population.

There were 342 households, of which 50.0% had children under the age of 18 living with them, 54.7% were married couples living together, 17.0% had a female householder with no husband present, 7.9% had a male householder with no wife present, and 20.5% were non-families. 17.0% of all households were made up of individuals, and 8.7% had someone living alone who was 65 years of age or older. The average household size was 2.99 and the average family size was 3.30.

The median age in the village was 30.5 years. 34% of residents were under the age of 18; 8.8% were between the ages of 18 and 24; 27.2% were from 25 to 44; 21.2% were from 45 to 64; and 8.8% were 65 years of age or older. The gender makeup of the village was 48.2% male and 51.8% female.

=== 2000 census ===
As of the census of 2000, there were 1,002 people, 355 households, and 275 families living in the village. The population density was 747.3 inhabitants per square mile (288.5/km^{2}). There were 376 housing units at an average density of 280.4 per square mile (108.3/km^{2}). The racial makeup of the village was 98.70% White, 0.70% African American, 0.20% Native American, 0.10% from other races, and 0.30% from two or more races. Hispanic or Latino people of any race were 0.10% of the population.

There were 355 households, out of which 44.8% had children under the age of 18 living with them, 55.8% were married couples living together, 19.2% had a female householder with no husband present, and 22.3% were non-families. 19.7% of all households were made up of individuals, and 9.6% had someone living alone who was 65 years of age or older. The average household size was 2.78 and the average family size was 3.19.

In the village, the population was spread out, with 32.2% under the age of 18, 7.4% from 18 to 24, 30.6% from 25 to 44, 20.5% from 45 to 64, and 9.3% who were 65 years of age or older. The median age was 32 years. For every 100 females there were 86.6 males. For every 100 females age 18 and over, there were 83.5 males.

The median income for a household in the village was $31,083, and the median income for a family was $32,292. Males had a median income of $28,333 versus $25,417 for females. The per capita income for the village was $14,115. About 20.0% of families and 22.7% of the population were below the poverty line, including 36.1% of those under age 18 and 20.2% of those age 65 or over.

== Events ==
The village of Williamsport hosts the annual "Deer Creek Dam Days" festival on the final weekend of May. Events center around the Deercreek reservoir dam as well as rural lifestyles.
