= Clarksburg, Ohio =

- Village
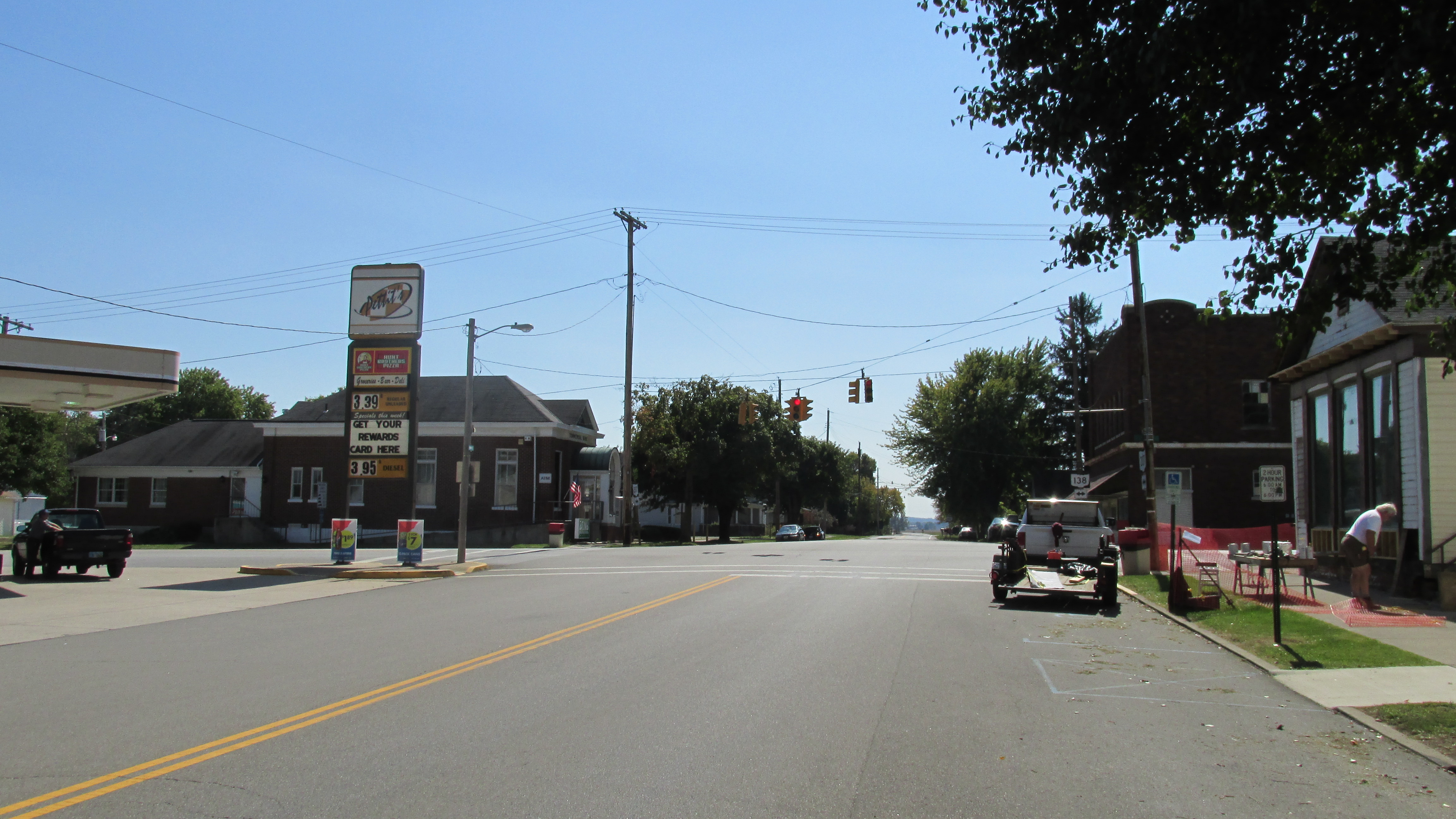
- Intersection of Main and High Streets in Clarksburg.

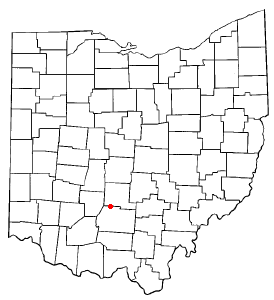
- Location of Clarksburg, Ohio

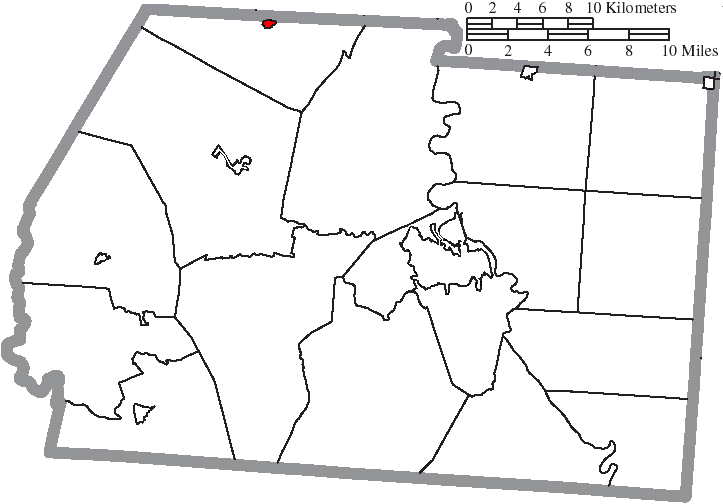
- Location of Clarksburg in Ross County
- Coordinates: 39°30′21″N 83°09′16″W
- Country: United States
- State: Ohio
- County: Ross

Area
  - Total: 0.16 sq mi (0.41 km^{2})
  - Land: 0.16 sq mi (0.41 km^{2})
  - Water: 0 sq mi (0.00 km^{2})
- Elevation: 771 ft (235 m)

Population (2020)
  - Total: 409
  - Estimate (2023): 403
  - Density: 2,580.2/sq mi (996.21/km^{2})
- Time zone: UTC-5 (Eastern (EST))
  - Summer (DST): UTC-4 (EDT)
- ZIP code: 43115
- Area code: 740
- FIPS code: 39-15336
- GNIS feature ID: 2397632

Clarksburg is a village in Ross County, Ohio, United States. The population was 409 at the 2020 census.

== History ==
The first permanent settlement at Clarksburg was founded circa 1800. Clarksburg was platted in 1817 by George Clark, and named for him.

== Geography ==
According to the United States Census Bureau, the village has a total area of 0.17 square miles (0.44 km^{2}), all land.

== Demographics ==
Historical population
Census	Pop.	Note	%±
1880	308		—
1890	378		22.7%
1900	551		45.8%
1910	558		1.3%
1920	420		−24.7%
1930	400		−4.8%
1940	390		−2.5%
1950	391		0.3%
1960	438		12.0%
1970	457		4.3%
1980	483		5.7%
1990	523		8.3%
2000	516		−1.3%
2010	455		−11.8%
2020	409		−10.1%
2023 (est.)	403	▼	−1.5%
U.S. Decennial Census

=== 2010 census ===
As of the census of 2010, there were 455 people, 166 households, and 117 families living in the village. The population density was 2,676.5 inhabitants per square mile (1,033.4/km^{2}). There were 184 housing units at an average density of 1,082.4 per square mile (417.9/km^{2}). The racial makeup of the village was 98.5% White, 0.2% African American, 0.4% from other races, and 0.9% from two or more races. Hispanic or Latino of any race were 1.8% of the population.

There were 166 households, of which 38.6% had children under the age of 18 living with them, 52.4% were married couples living together, 15.1% had a female householder with no husband present, 3.0% had a male householder with no wife present, and 29.5% were non-families. 22.9% of all households were made up of individuals, and 12% had someone living alone who was 65 years of age or older. The average household size was 2.74 and the average family size was 3.23.

The median age in the village was 34.8 years. 29% of residents were under the age of 18; 8% were between the ages of 18 and 24; 25.8% were from 25 to 44; 23% were from 45 to 64; and 14.3% were 65 years of age or older. The gender makeup of the village was 47.3% male and 52.7% female.

=== 2000 census ===
As of the census of 2000, there were 516 people, 178 households, and 131 families living in the village. The population density was 2,772.9 inhabitants per square mile (1,070.6/km^{2}). There were 190 housing units at an average density of 1,021.0 per square mile (394.2/km^{2}). The racial makeup of the village was 97.48% White, 1.55% African American, 0.19% Native American, 0.58% from other races, and 0.19% from two or more races.

There were 178 households, out of which 37.1% had children under the age of 18 living with them, 53.4% were married couples living together, 15.7% had a female householder with no husband present, and 26.4% were non-families. 20.8% of all households were made up of individuals, and 9.6% had someone living alone who was 65 years of age or older. The average household size was 2.80 and the average family size was 3.20.

In the village, the population was spread out, with 28.5% under the age of 18, 9.7% from 18 to 24, 28.1% from 25 to 44, 22.7% from 45 to 64, and 11.0% who were 65 years of age or older. The median age was 32 years. For every 100 females there were 100.8 males. For every 100 females age 18 and over, there were 95.2 males.

The median income for a household in the village was $32,159, and the median income for a family was $36,667. Males had a median income of $30,781 versus $17,500 for females. The per capita income for the village was $12,064. About 14.6% of families and 18.8% of the population were below the poverty line, including 26.4% of those under age 18 and 18.8% of those age 65 or over.

== Gallery ==
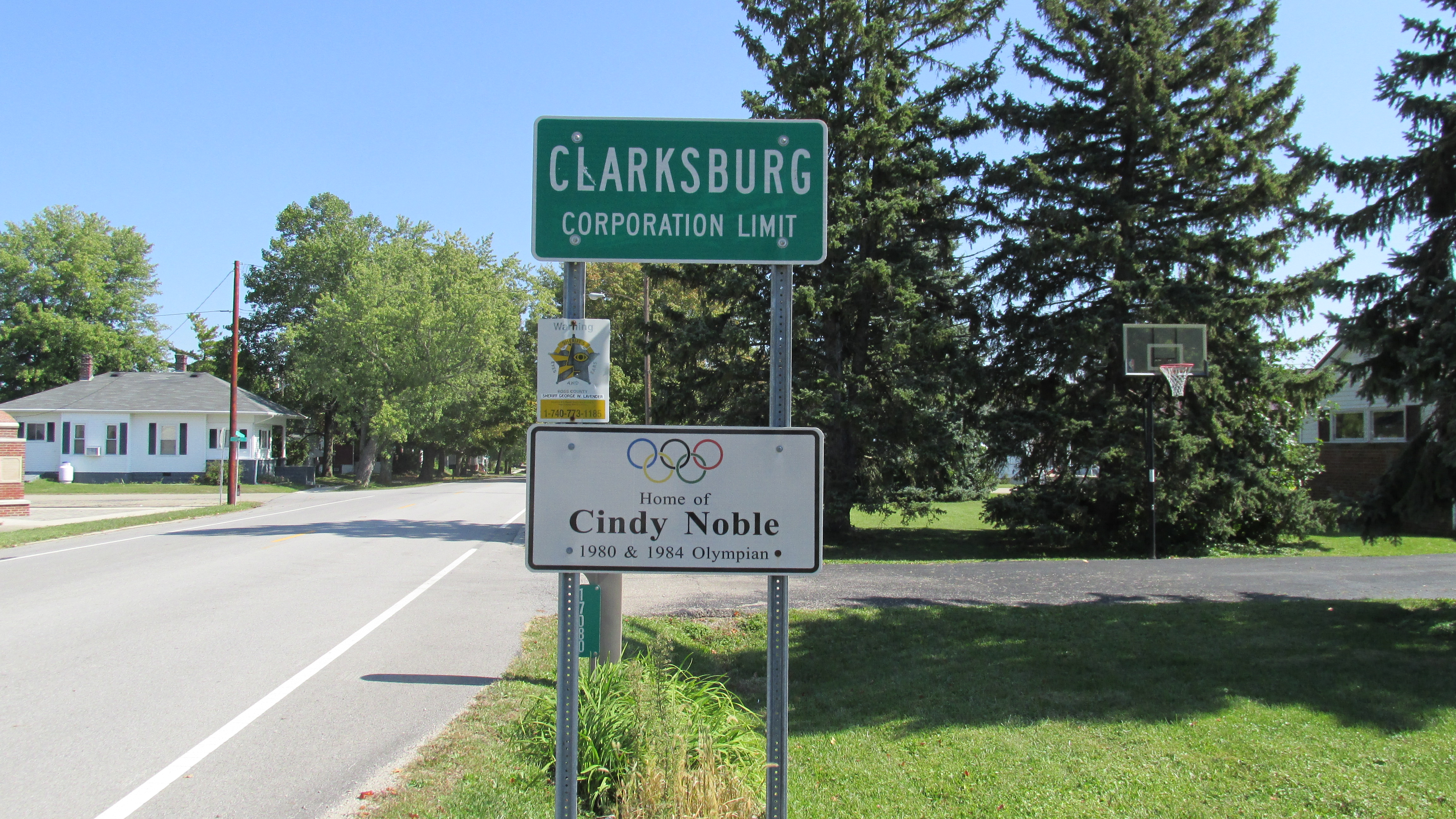
Clarksburg corporation limit sign

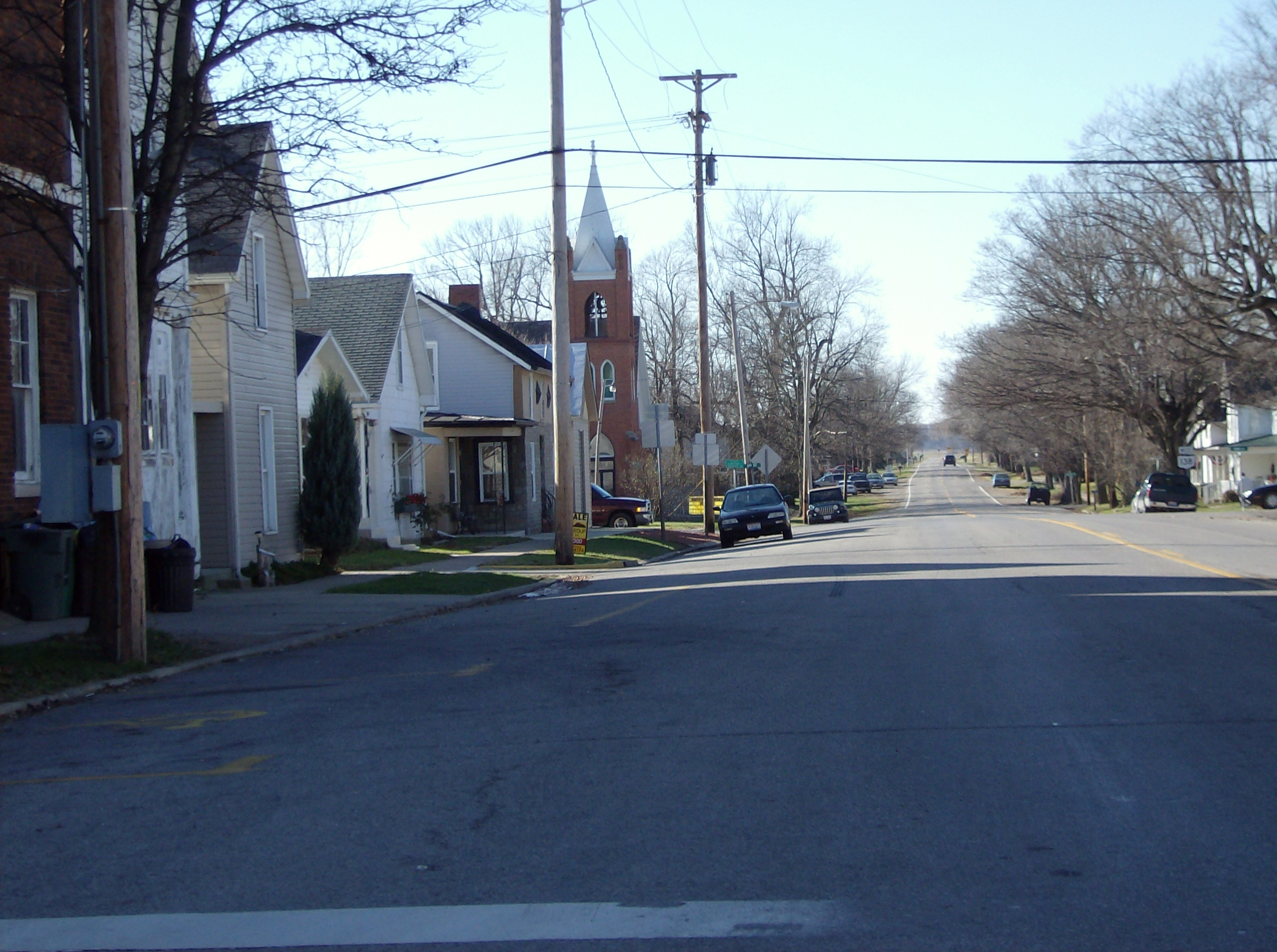
Along High Street (Ohio Highway 138) in Clarksburg

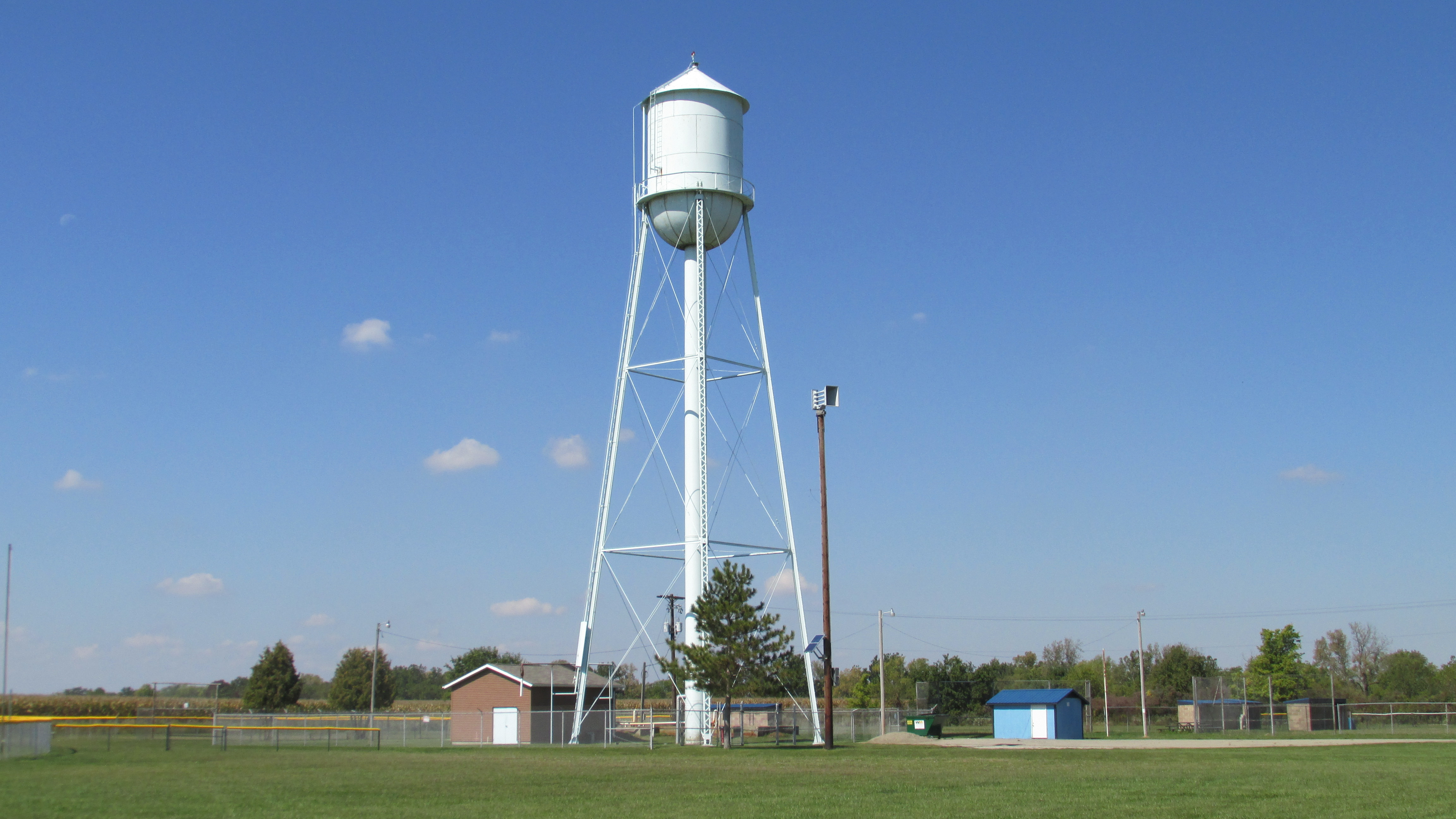
Water tower in Clarksburg

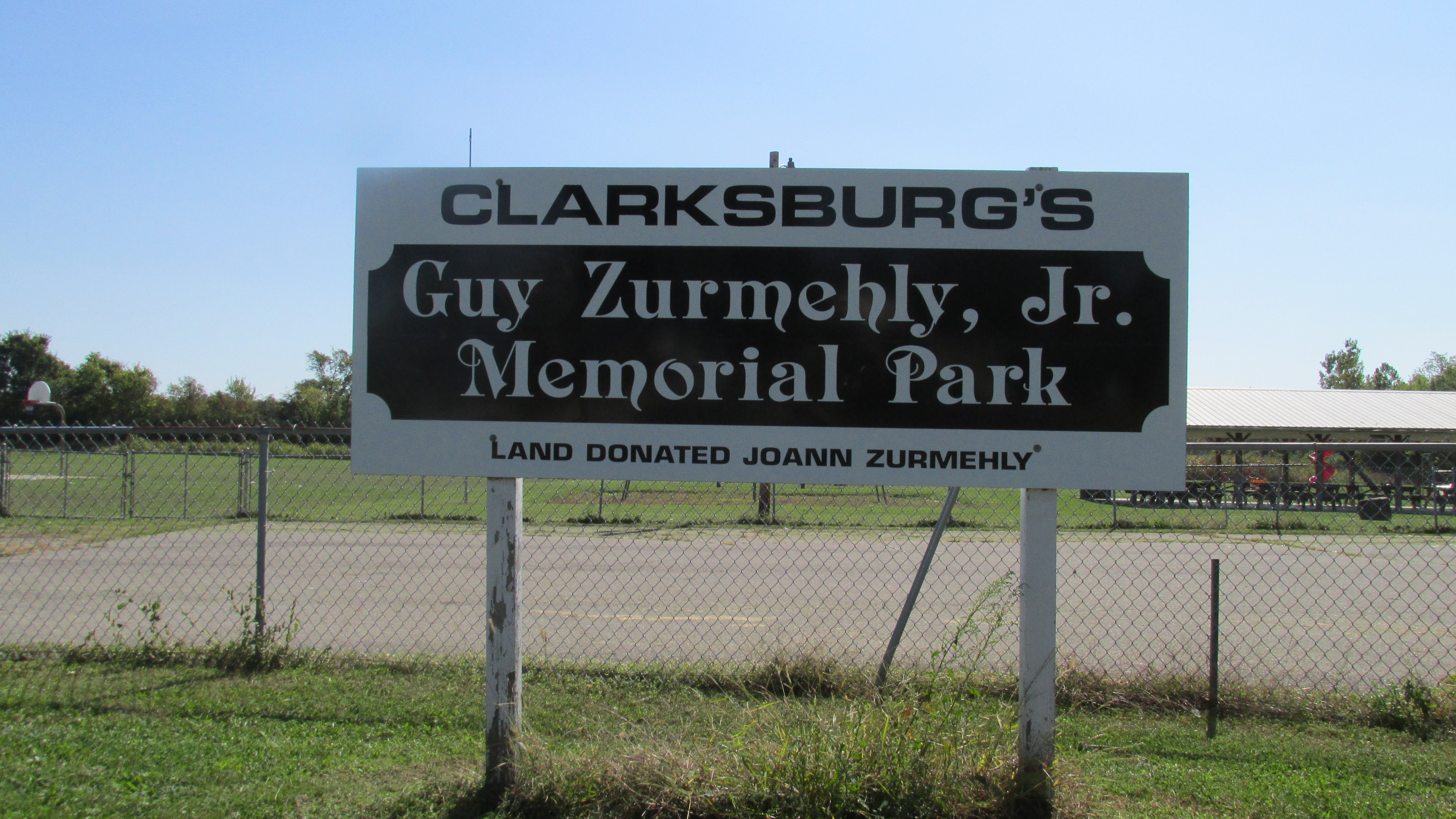
Zurmehly Park

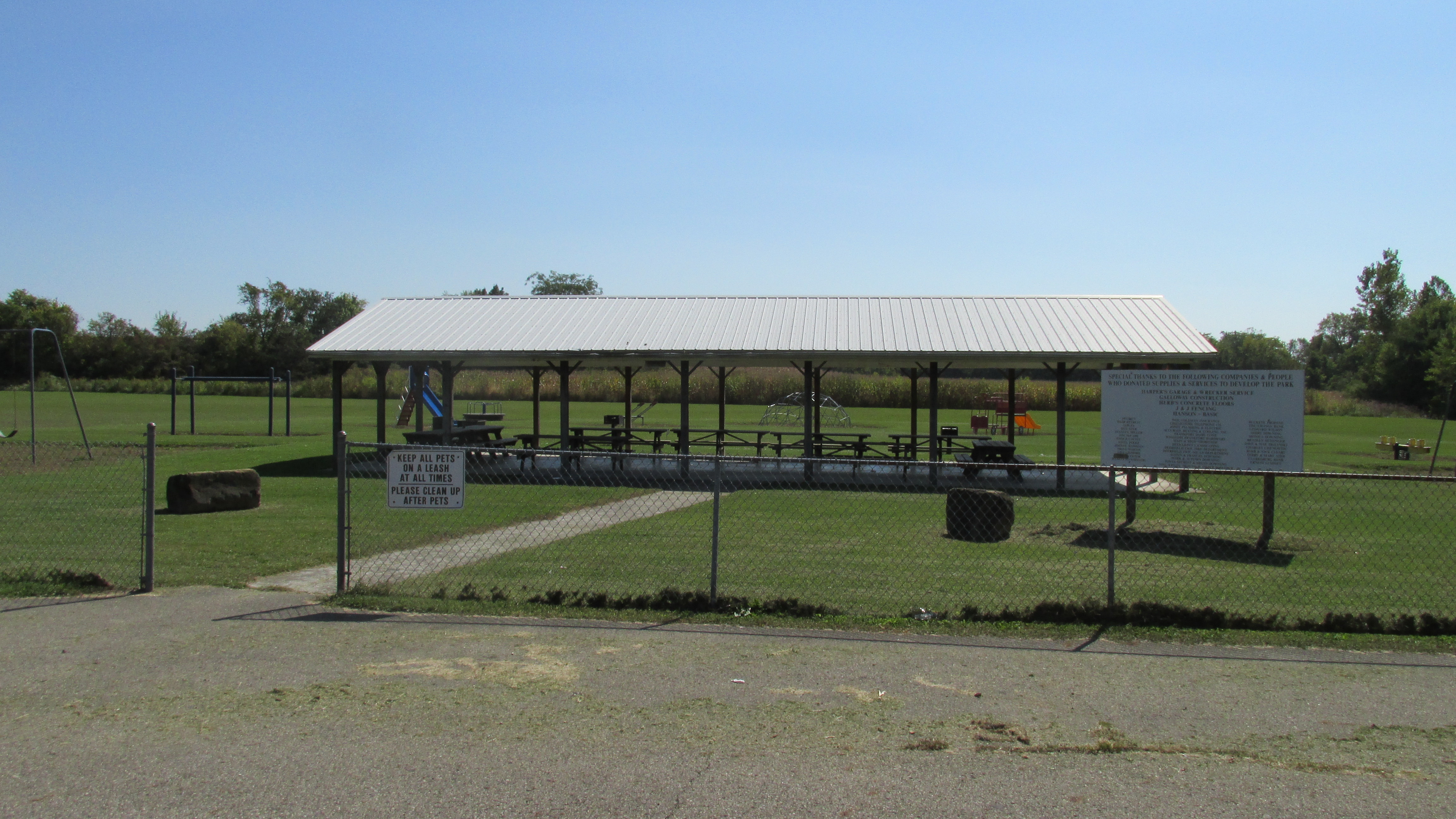
Zurmehly Park

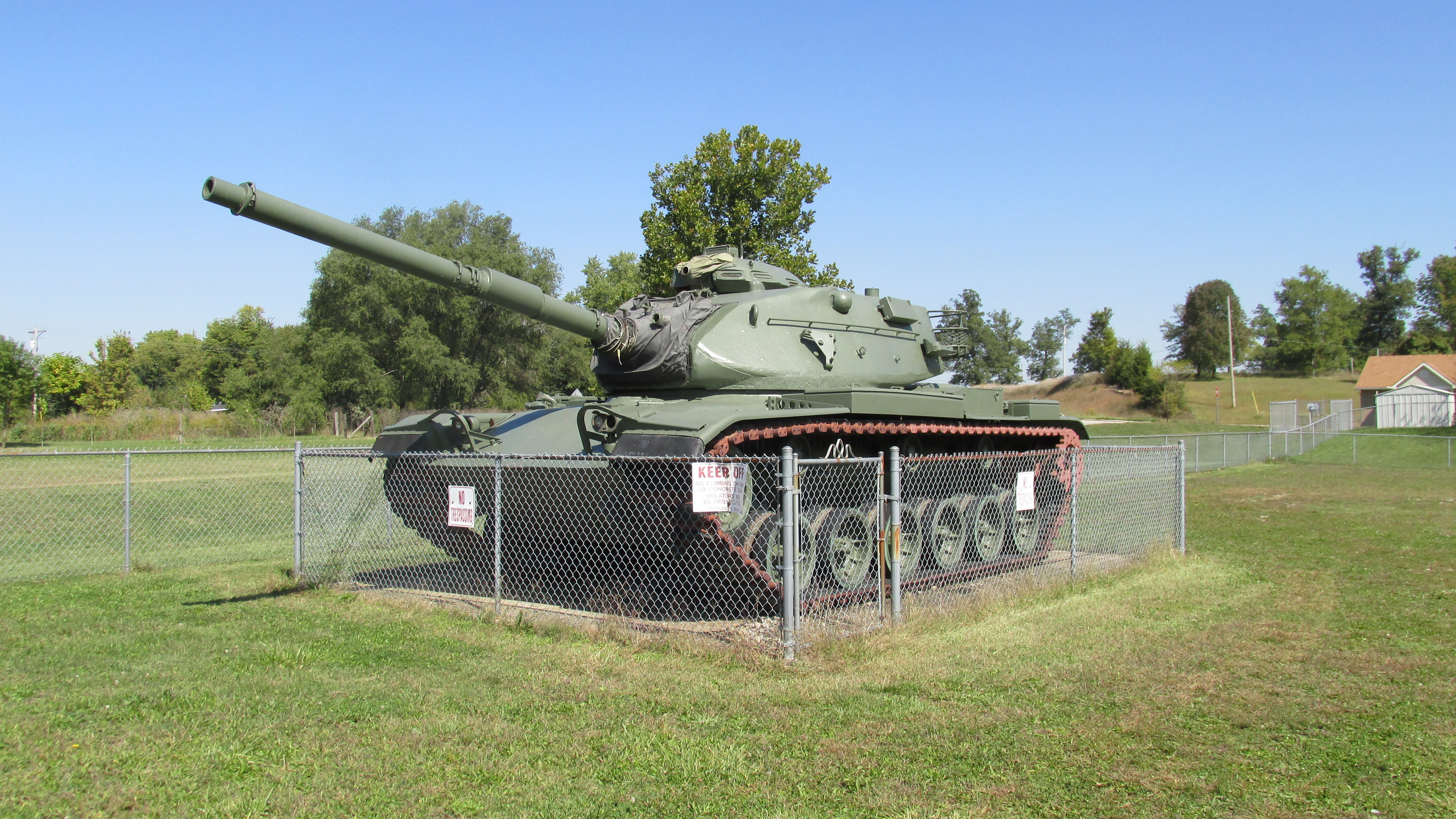
Zurmehly Park

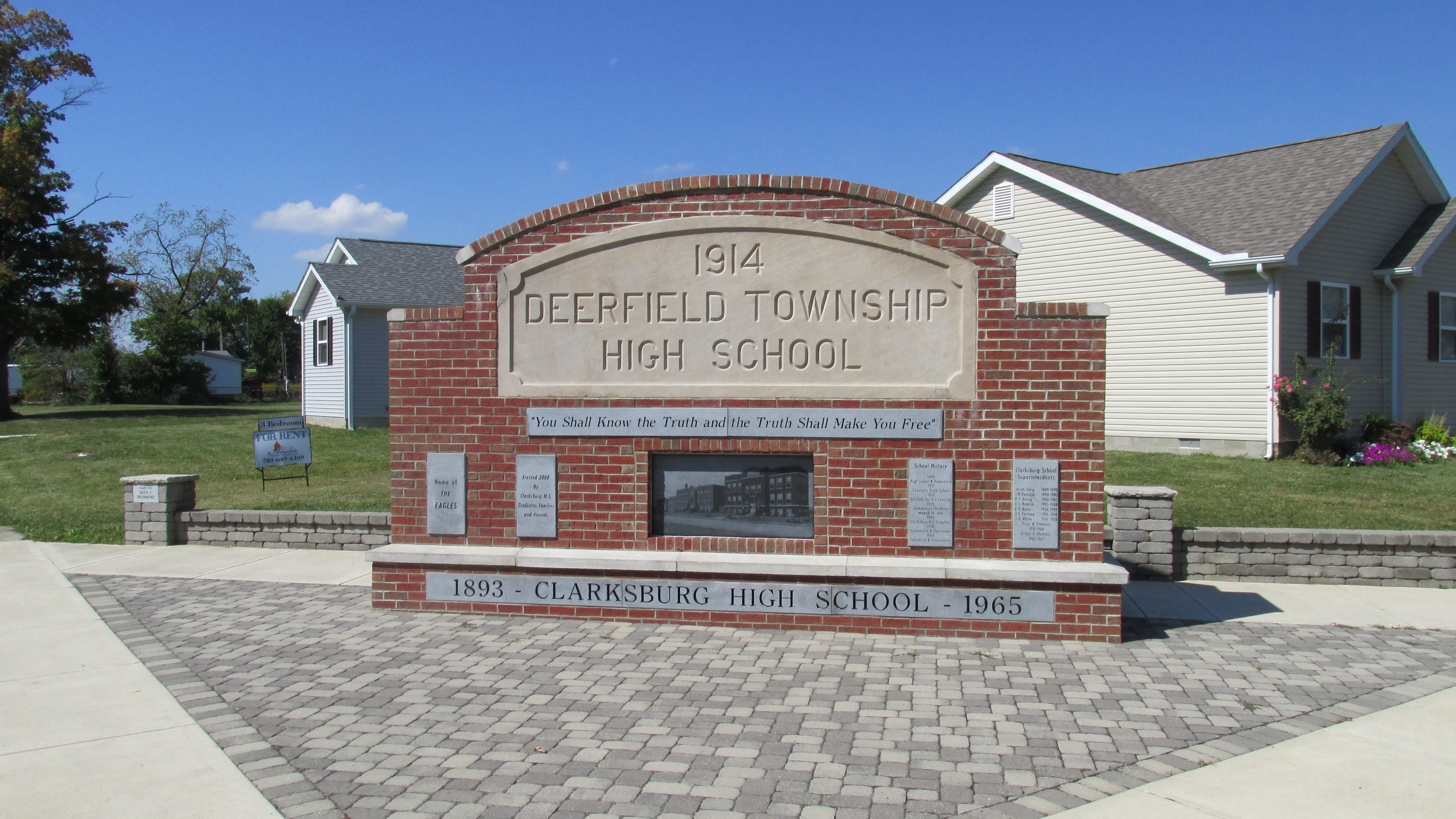
Site of former Clarksburg/Deerfield Township High School (1893 - 1965)
