= Westfall High School =

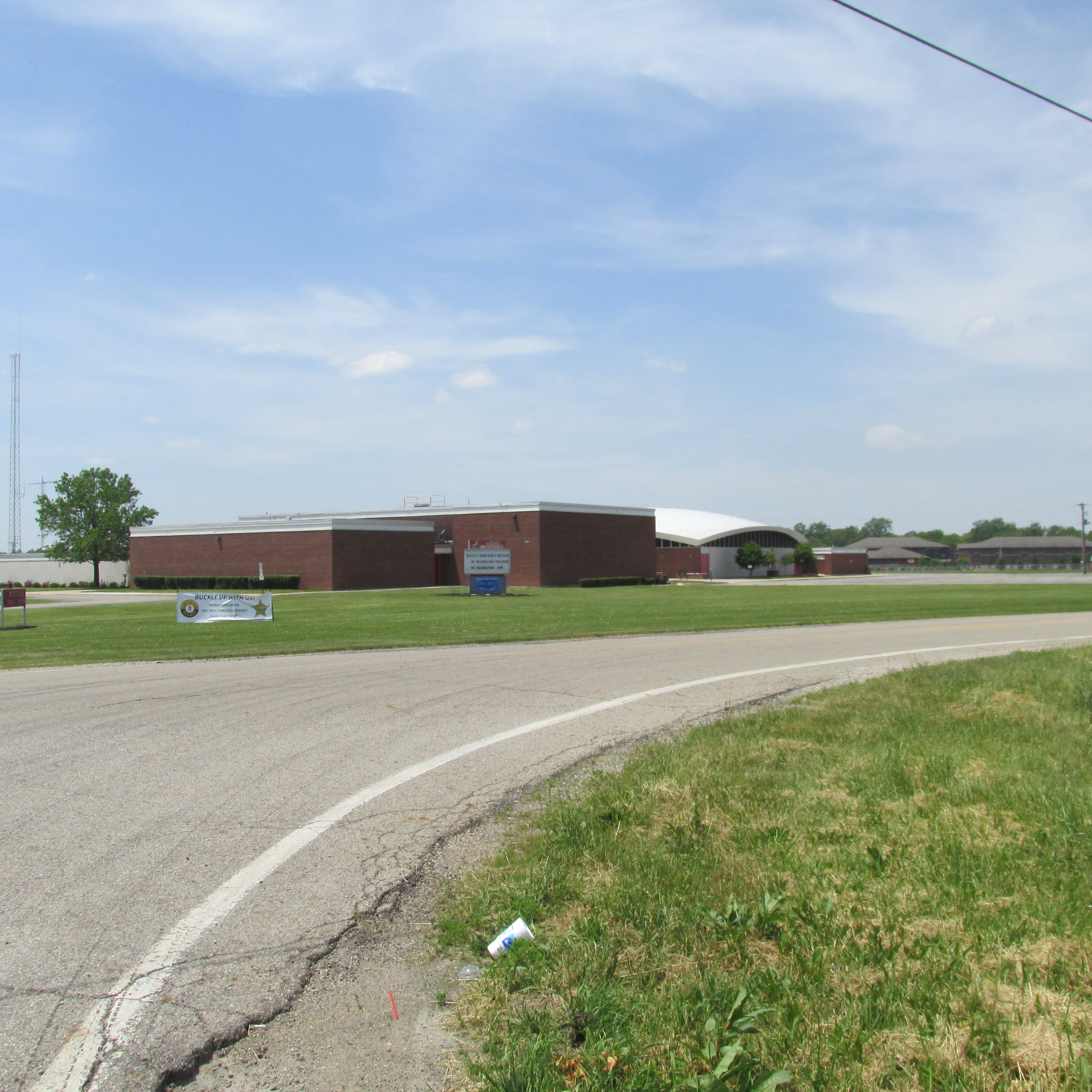
- Westfall High School

Location
- 19463 Pherson Pike; Williamsport, Ohio 43164; United States
- Coordinates: 39°39′19″N 83°07′16″W

Information
- Type: Public
- School district: Westfall Local Schools
- Superintendent: Jason Fife
- Principal: Dana Ortman
- Grades: 9-12
- Enrollment: 421 (2023–2024)
- Color
- Athletics: Scioto Valley Conference
- Mascot: Mustang
- Newspaper: ECHO
- Information: (740) 986-2911
- Website: Westfall High School

Westfall High School is a public high school near Williamsport, Ohio, United States. It is the only high school in the Westfall Local School District. The Westfall Local School District coverage area is mostly rural, and includes all or portions of six townships situated in the western part of Pickaway County. Westfall Middle School and Westfall High School are now combined with a community building.

== Athletics ==
=== Ohio High School Athletic Association State Championships ===
- Girls Softball - 2014

== Notable events ==
On March 2, 1977, Gordon Massie, a teacher at the school received a letter from an anonymous person claiming to have known about secret affairs in which he participated in. This is believed to be the first occurrence of the Circleville Letters, a series of threatening letters that terrorized the nearby town of Circleville from the 1970s until the 1990s.
