= Piketon High School =

School in Ohio, United States

Coordinates: 39°03′52″N 83°01′21″W

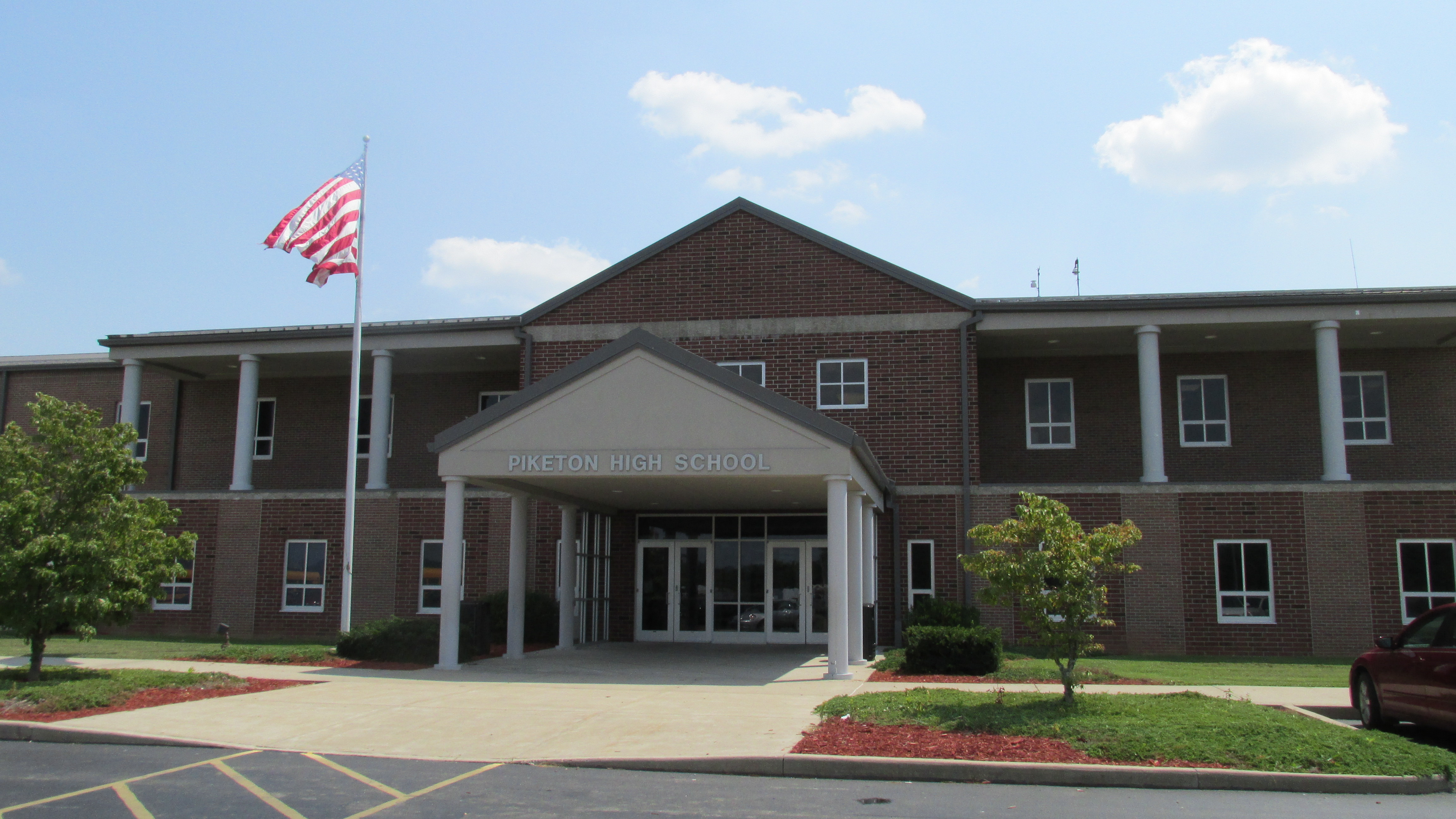

Location
- 1414 Piketon Road; Piketon, (Pike County), Ohio 45661; United States

Information
- Type: Public high school
- Principal: Jeff Reuter
- Teaching staff: 33.00 (FTE)
- Enrollment: 656 (2023-2024)
- Student to teacher ratio: 19.88
- Colors: Scarlet and gray
- Athletics conference: Scioto Valley Conference
- Nickname: Redstreaks

Piketon High School is a public high school in Piketon, Ohio, USA. It is the only high school in the Scioto Valley Local School District. The nickname is the Redstreaks.

== Athletics ==
Piketon High plays in the Scioto Valley Conference. The boys basketball team has 7 Conference Championships, 19 Sectional Championships, 4 District Championships, and 1 Regional Championship (2009).
