= Huntington High School (Ohio) =

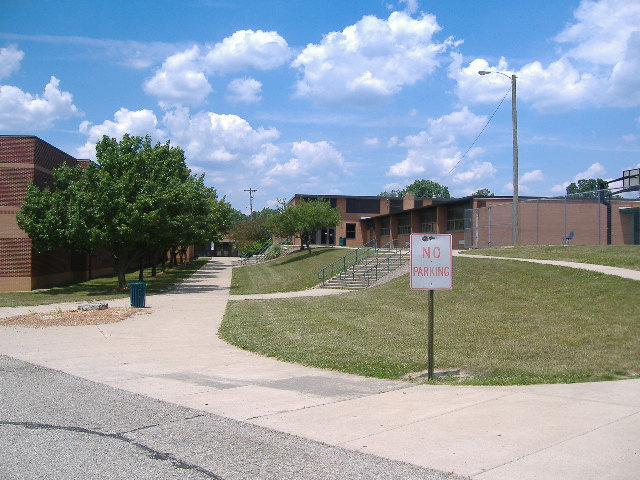

Location
- Chillicothe, Ohio; United States
- Coordinates: 39°14′42″N 83°03′24″W

Information
- Type: Public High School
- School district: Huntington
- Superintendent: Pete Ruby
- CEEB code: 360935
- Principal: Craig Kerns
- Grades: 9–12
- Enrollment: 306 (2023–24)
- Color(s): Hunter green, white
- Team name: Huntsmen
- Website: huntsmen.org

Huntington High School is a public high school located at 188 Huntsmen Road in Huntington Township, near Chillicothe, Ohio in Ross County. It is the only high school in the Huntington Local School District. The school is in conjunction with the Huntington Elementary and Huntington Middle school which buildings it connects to.

== History ==
In 1902, there stood sixteen different schools within Huntington Township. The first school had been taught by Thomas Gilfillen, while other teachers included Benning Wentworth, Zebulon Dow, Theophilus Wood, and Keith Green.

Huntington Township school, which would later turn into the elementary, middle, and high school, was built in 1926.
