= National Register of Historic Places listings in Pickaway County, Ohio =

Location of Pickaway County in Ohio

This is a list of the National Register of Historic Places listings in Pickaway County, Ohio, USA.

This is intended to be a complete list of the properties and districts on the National Register of Historic Places in Pickaway County, Ohio. The locations of National Register properties and districts for which the latitude and longitude coordinates are included below, may be seen in an online map.

There are 33 properties and districts listed on the National Register in the county.

This National Park Service list is complete through NPS recent listings posted August 28, 2026.

== Current listings ==
	Name on the Register	Image	Date listed	Location	City or town	Description
1	William Marshall Anderson House	William Marshall Anderson House	November 29, 1979 (#79001925)	131 W. Union St. 39°35′57″N 82°56′50″W	Circleville	
2	Adams Archeological Preserve	Adams Archeological Preserve	July 30, 1974 (#74001591)	Off State Route 56 southeast of Circleville; 39°33′00″N 82°52′27″W	Pickaway Township	Private Property
3	Ashville Depot	Ashville Depot	February 25, 1980 (#80003209)	Madison and Cromley Sts. 39°42′54″N 82°57′20″W	Ashville	
4	Bazore Mill	Bazore Mill	December 19, 1978 (#78002172)	South of Williamsport on State Route 138 at Deer Creek; 39°33′04″N 83°06′31″W	Deer Creek Township	
5	Bellevue	Bellevue	March 17, 1976 (#76001508)	North of Kingston on State Route 159; 39°29′01″N 82°54′07″W	Pickaway Township	
6	Joseph Black Farmhouse	Joseph Black Farmhouse	August 9, 1982 (#02001459)	9862 Heffner Rd. 39°30′51″N 82°50′47″W	Pickaway Township	
7	Granville M. Bulen House and Farm Complex	Granville M. Bulen House and Farm Complex	February 24, 2014 (#14000028)	10001 Bulen-Pierce Rd., south of Lockbourne; 39°47′14″N 82°58′34″W	Harrison Township	
8	Circleville High School	Circleville High School	August 31, 2015 (#15000576)	520 S. Court St. 39°35′48″N 82°56′49″W	Circleville	
9	Circleville Historic District	Circleville Historic District	May 16, 1978 (#78002171)	Main and Court Sts. 39°36′07″N 82°56′42″W	Circleville	
10	W.C. Clemmons Mound	W.C. Clemmons Mound	May 2, 1974 (#74001594)	Southern side of Florence Chapel Rd., northwest of Fox; 39°38′57″N 83°01′44″W	Jackson Township	Near Fox
11	Fleming-Hoffman Farm	Fleming-Hoffman Farm	August 25, 2022 (#100006647)	25043 OH 104; 39°34′04″N 83°00′04″W	Circleville vicinity	
12	Fridley-Oman Farm	Fridley-Oman Farm	December 6, 1975 (#75001517)	West of Marcy in Slate Run Metropolitan Park; 39°45′13″N 82°50′54″W	Madison Township	
13	Gill-Morris Farm	Gill-Morris Farm	August 14, 1986 (#86001658)	10104 State Route 56, southeast of Circleville; 39°32′19″N 82°50′36″W	Salt Creek Township	
14	Gregg-Crites Octagon House	Gregg-Crites Octagon House	June 21, 2021 (#100006653)	440 Crites Rd. 39°35′07″N 82°56′31″W	Circleville	
15	Horn Mound	Horn Mound	August 7, 1974 (#74001595)	Dead end of Armstrong Road, southeast of Tarlton; 39°31′20″N 82°44′22″W	Salt Creek Township	Near Tarlton
16	Horsey-Barthelmas Farm	Horsey-Barthelmas Farm	July 24, 1980 (#80003210)	West of Circleville on State Route 104; 39°33′18″N 83°00′32″W	Wayne Township	
17	Lawndale Farm Complex	Lawndale Farm Complex	April 19, 1984 (#84003795)	26476 Gay Dreisbach Rd., south of Circleville; 39°32′49″N 82°55′10″W	Pickaway Township	
18	Luthor List Mound	Luthor List Mound	October 16, 1974 (#74001592)	Along the Kingston Pike, southeast of Circleville; 39°34′31″N 82°55′29″W	Circleville Township	Also known as the Burning Mound
19	Matthew McCrea House	Matthew McCrea House	September 29, 1988 (#88001714)	428 E. Main St. 39°35′58″N 82°56′12″W	Circleville	
20	Memorial Hall	Memorial Hall	November 21, 1980 (#80003211)	165 E. Main St. 39°36′03″N 82°56′34″W	Circleville	
21	Morris House	Morris House	August 3, 1979 (#79001926)	149 W. Union St. 39°35′58″N 82°56′56″W	Circleville	
22	Mount Oval	Mount Oval	July 25, 1974 (#74001593)	Off U.S. Route 23, south of Circleville; 39°31′42″N 82°57′59″W	Pickaway Township	
23	Ohio and Erie Canal Southern Descent Historic District		April 1, 2019 (#100003572)	Multiple; 39°42′32″N 82°58′19″W	Ashville	Boundary increase approved September 2, 2022; extends into other Ohio counties
24	Perrill-Goodman Farm House	Perrill-Goodman Farm House	March 14, 1985 (#85000565)	Goodman Rd., south of Groveport; 39°47′18″N 82°52′56″W	Madison Township	
25	Stevenson Peters House	Stevenson Peters House	February 9, 1984 (#84003797)	9860 State Route 188, northeast of Circleville; 39°40′29″N 82°50′17″W	Walnut Township	
26	Redlands	Redlands	May 14, 1982 (#82003630)	1960 N. Court St., north of Circleville; 39°38′06″N 82°56′31″W	Circleville Township	
27	Renick Farm	Renick Farm	March 5, 1982 (#82003631)	North of South Bloomfield on U.S. Route 23; 39°45′01″N 82°59′28″W	Harrison Township	
28	Saint Philip's Episcopal Church	Saint Philip's Episcopal Church	May 15, 1986 (#86001064)	129 W. Mound St. 39°35′59″N 82°56′50″W	Circleville	
29	Scioto Township District No. 2 Schoolhouse	Scioto Township District No. 2 Schoolhouse	May 6, 1987 (#87000634)	8143 Snyder Rd., east of Orient; 39°47′45″N 83°05′38″W	Scioto Township	
30	The Shack	The Shack	May 23, 1974 (#74001596)	Northwest of Williamsport; 39°38′07″N 83°13′47″W	Monroe Township	
31	Tick Ridge Mound District	Tick Ridge Mound District	June 11, 1975 (#75001518)	Tick Ridge Peninsula in Deer Creek State Park; 39°36′56″N 83°14′15″W	Monroe Township	
32	Ansel T. Walling House	Ansel T. Walling House	December 14, 1987 (#87002145)	146 W. Union St. 39°35′58″N 82°56′55″W	Circleville	
33	Watt-Groce-Fickhardt House	Watt-Groce-Fickhardt House	August 23, 1985 (#85001804)	360 E. Main St. 39°36′00″N 82°56′20″W	Circleville	

== See also ==
- List of National Historic Landmarks in Ohio
- Listings in neighboring counties: Fairfield, Fayette, Franklin, Hocking, Madison, Ross
- National Register of Historic Places listings in Ohio
