= Ashville =

Ashville or Asheville may refer to:

== Places ==
=== United States ===
- Ashville, Alabama
- Ashville, Louisville, Kentucky
- Ashville, New York
- Asheville, North Carolina
  - Asheville metropolitan area
  - Asheville School
  - Asheville High School
  - Asheville Regional Airport
- Ashville, Ohio
  - Ashville Depot, a former train station
- Ashville, Pennsylvania

=== Elsewhere ===
- Ashville, South Australia, Australia
- Ashville, Manitoba, Canada
- Ashville Formation, a geological formation in Canada
- Ashville College, in Harrogate, England

== Ships ==
- Asheville-class gunboat
- Asheville-class gunboat (1917)
- USS Asheville, the name of several U.S. Navy ships

== See also ==
- Ashville Historic District (disambiguation)
