= Crites =

Crites is a surname. Notable people with the surname include:

- Alice Crites, Pulitzer Prize winning journalist
- Mike Crites (born 1948), American politician
- Shirley Crites (1934–1990), American baseball player
- Winston Crite (born 1965), American basketball player

== See also ==
- Crite
- Crites, West Virginia, incorporated area in Logan County, West Virginia
- Crites, a fictional character in the Critters film series
- Gregg-Crites Octagon House, or M. M. Crites house, an octagon house located in Circleville, Ohio
