= Crite =

Crite is a surname. Notable people with the surname include:

- Allan Crite (1910–2007), Boston-based African American artist
- Winston Crite (born 1965), American basketball player

== See also ==
- Crit (disambiguation)
- Crites
