= Matthew McCrea House =

Historic house in Ohio, United States

- U.S. National Register of Historic Places
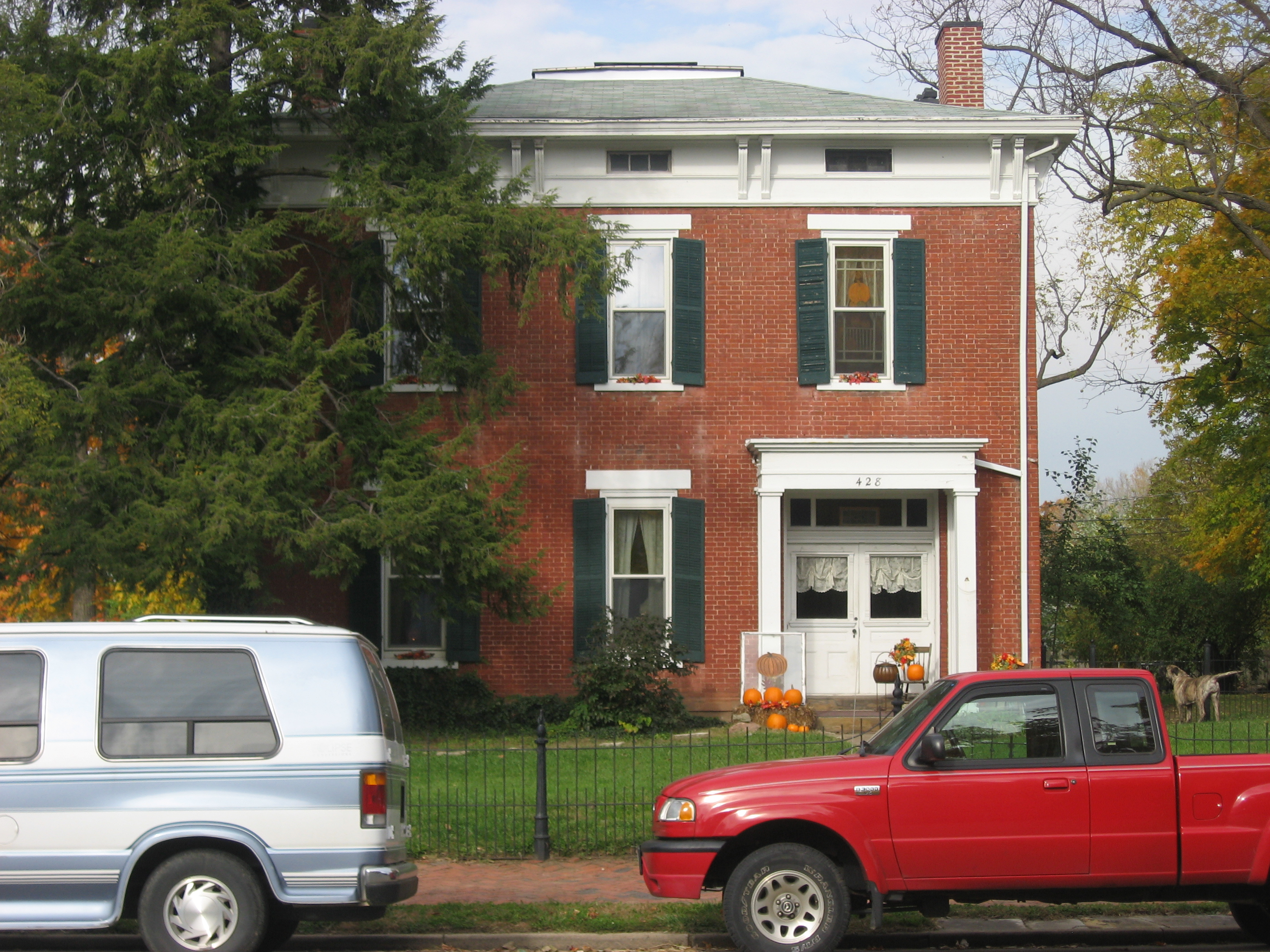
- Front of the house

- Location within Ohio Location within the United States
- Location: 428 E. Main St., Circleville, Ohio
- Coordinates: 39°36′14″N 82°56′7″W
- Area: Less than 1 acre (0.40 ha)
- Built: 1840
- Architectural style: Greek Revival, Italianate
- NRHP reference No.: 88001714
- Added to NRHP: September 29, 1988

The Matthew McCrea House is a historic house in Circleville, Ohio, United States. Located along Main Street on the city's eastern side, the house mixes elements of the Greek Revival and Italianate architectural styles.

Built circa 1840, the McCrea House is a brick building with a foundation of sandstone and a roof of asphalt, plus minor elements of wood and sandstone. Two stories high, the house is built in a mixed architectural style: its structure is the post and beam characteristic of period Greek Revival structures, but the overall shape is that of early Italianate houses. Among its Italianate elements are its cubical shape, a shallow hip roof, and large eaves supported by double brackets. Greek Revival elements include the entrance portico, a large entablature with frieze windows, and sandstone window sills and lintels. Inside, the house features original its original walnut woodwork and a circular stairway wrought of cherry.

For its first several decades, the McCrea House was almost alone; only one other nearby house was built circa 1840, for the surrounding neighborhood was primarily constructed in the last decade of the nineteenth century. Because of its historic architecture, the McCrea House was listed on the National Register of Historic Places in 1988. It lies one block east of the Watt-Groce-Fickhardt House, which is also listed on the National Register.
