= Mount Oval =

- U.S. National Register of Historic Places
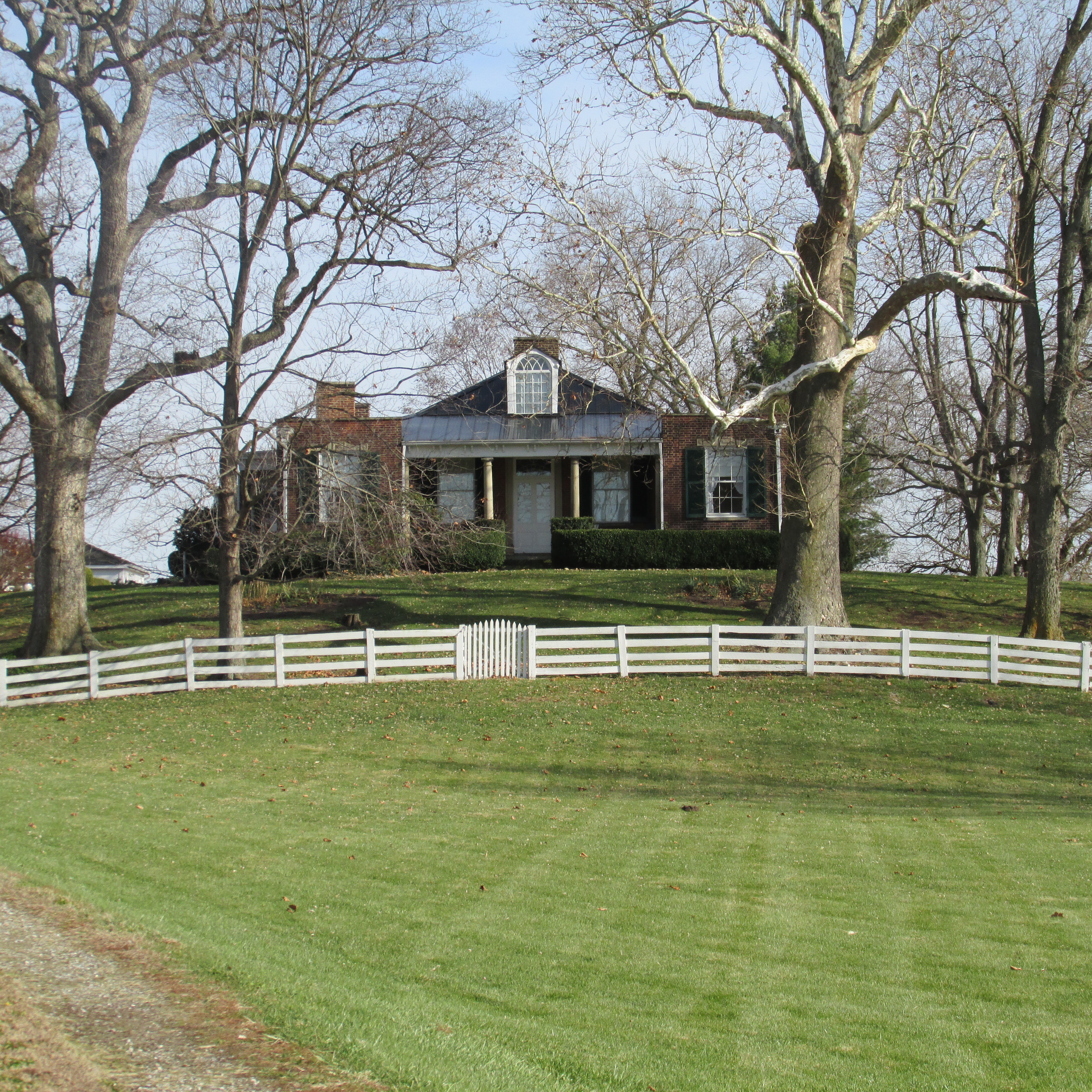
- Roadside view of the house

- Location within Ohio Location within the United States
- Location: Off U.S. Route 23, south of Circleville, Ohio
- Coordinates: 39°31′42″N 82°57′59″W
- Area: 4 acres (1.6 ha)
- Built: 1832
- Architectural style: Palladian
- NRHP reference No.: 74001593
- Added to NRHP: July 25, 1974

Mount Oval is a historic farmhouse in the south central part of the U.S. state of Ohio, south of the city of Circleville. Built in the 1830s, it was home to some of the region's more prominent farmers, and it has been named a historic site.

The first settler at the site of Mount Oval was John Boggs, who purchased the property from the U.S. government in 1806; the deed for the property was signed by Thomas Jefferson and James Madison, at that time President of the United States and United States Secretary of State. Arriving at the property, he discovered extensive evidence of aboriginal occupation at the site: localities such as Chief Cornstalk's Town, Camps Charlotte and Lewis, Grenadier Squaw Town, and Logan Elm were all near Boggs' new property. Boggs remained on the property until 1832, when William Renick married Jane Boggs and built the present house. During the period that the Renicks owned Mount Oval, it became a prominent center of cattle farming: the Renicks became the first farmers in the region to supply their cattle to the East Coast. Later owners included the families of Bernard Young, Mary Tolbert, and Jacob Ludwig, although for several decades the Ludwigs rented the property to tenants.

Mount Oval itself is a brick building with metal roof and elements of wood and stone. Architecturally, the house is a pure example of the Palladian style of architecture, displaying some elements that are patterned after Villa Capra, a grand Palladian mansion in northern Italy. Among its more distinctive elements is an interior room dedicated to caring for the needs of cattlemen; the Renicks' cattle farming prompted them to construct dedicated facilities within their home.

In 1974, Mount Oval was listed on the National Register of Historic Places, along with a single outbuilding; it qualified for inclusion because of its distinctive historic architecture. More than twenty-five different locations in Pickaway County are listed on the National Register, and Mount Oval achieved this distinction earlier than all but two of the others.
