= Ashville Historic District =

Ashville Historic District may refer to:

- Ashville Historic District (Ashville, Alabama), listed on the NRHP in Alabama
- Ashville Historic District (Marshall, Virginia), listed on the NRHP in Virginia

== See also ==
- Downtown Asheville Historic District, in Asheville, North Carolina, listed on the NRHP in North Carolina
- West Asheville End of Car Line Historic District, in Asheville, North Carolina, listed on the NRHP in North Carolina
- West Asheville-Aycock School Historic District, in Asheville, North Carolina, listed on the NRHP in North Carolina
