= Washington Township, Pickaway County, Ohio =

Township in Ohio, US

- Township
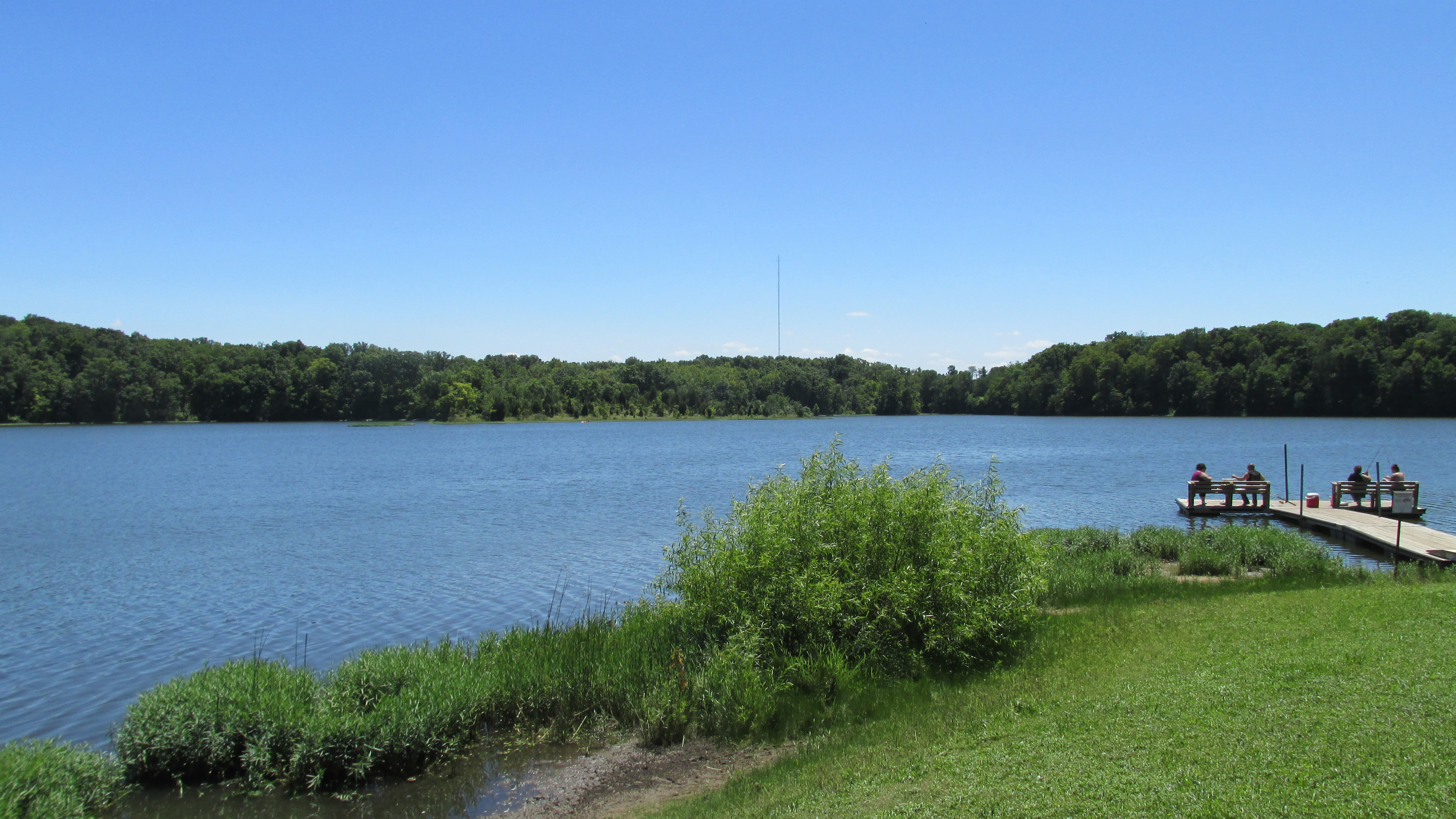
- Lake at A. W. Marion State Park

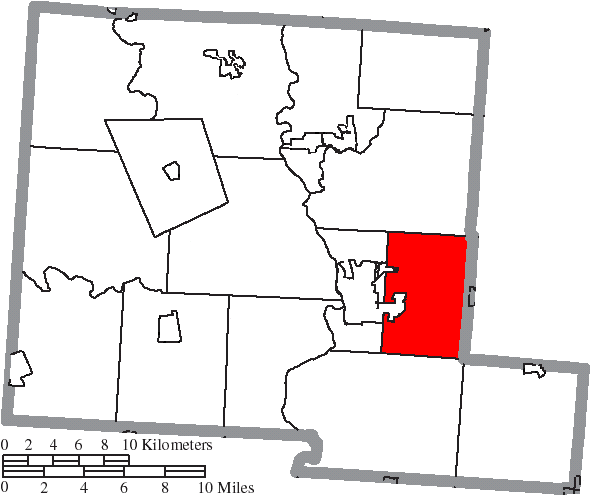
- Location of Washington Township in Pickaway County
- Coordinates: 39°36′49″N 82°53′42″W
- Country: United States
- State: Ohio
- County: Pickaway

Area
  - Total: 24.2 sq mi (62.7 km^{2})
  - Land: 23.9 sq mi (61.9 km^{2})
  - Water: 0.31 sq mi (0.8 km^{2})
- Elevation: 774 ft (236 m)

Population (2020)
  - Total: 2,991
  - Density: 125/sq mi (48.3/km^{2})
- Time zone: UTC-5 (Eastern (EST))
  - Summer (DST): UTC-4 (EDT)
- FIPS code: 39-81550
- GNIS feature ID: 1086805
- Website: https://washingtontownship.net/

Washington Township is one of the fifteen townships of Pickaway County, Ohio, United States. The 2020 census found 2,991 people in the township.

== Geography ==
Located in the eastern part of the county, it borders the following townships:

- Walnut Township - north
- Amanda Township, Fairfield County - northeast
- Clearcreek Township, Fairfield County - east
- Salt Creek Township - southeast corner
- Pickaway Township - south
- Circleville Township - west

Part of western Washington Township is occupied by the city of Circleville, the county seat of Pickaway County.

== Name and history ==
It is one of forty-three Washington Townships statewide.

== Government ==
The township is governed by a three-member board of trustees, who are elected in November of odd-numbered years to a four-year term beginning on the following January 1. Two are elected in the year after the presidential election and one is elected in the year before it. There is also an elected township fiscal officer, who serves a four-year term beginning on April 1 of the year after the election, which is held in November of the year before the presidential election. Vacancies in the fiscal officership or on the board of trustees are filled by the remaining trustees.
