= Stage's Pond State Nature Preserve =

State nature preserve in Ohio, United States

- Stage's Pond
- IUCN category V (protected landscape/seascape)
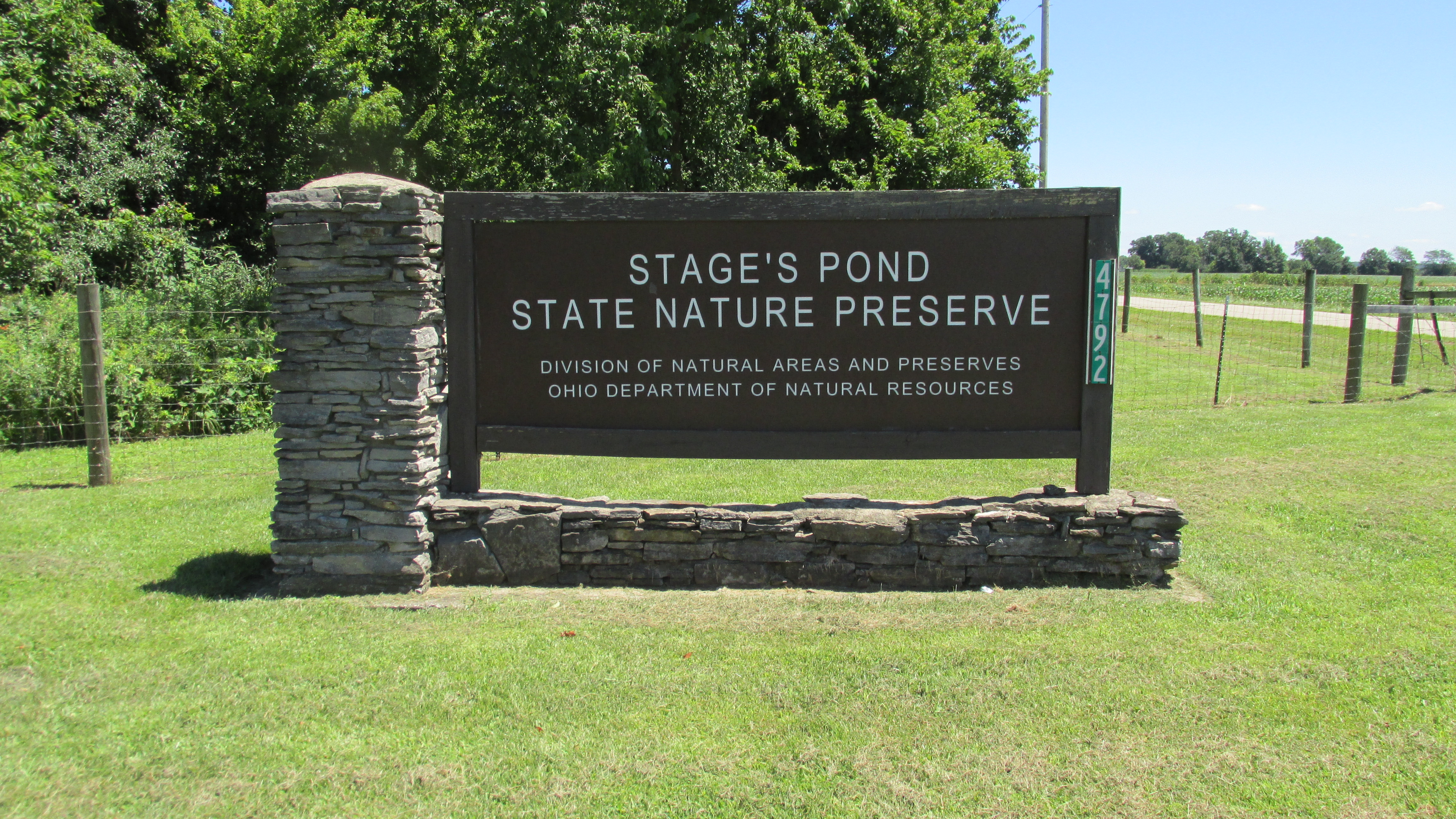
- Stage's Pond State Nature Preserve entrance.

- Location within Ohio Location within the United States
- Location: Pickaway County
- Nearest city: Circleville, Ohio
- Coordinates: 39.6764°N 82.9395°W
- Area: 178 acres (72 ha)
- Established: 1974
- Governing body: Ohio Department of Natural Resources

Stage's Pond State Nature Preserve is a 178 acres (0.72 km^{2}) nature preserve with ponds in Walnut Township, Pickaway County, Ohio.

The State Nature Preserve is located at 4792 Hagerty Road, north of the county seat of Circleville. The preserve was dedicated on August 23, 1974.

== Natural history ==
The large pond is an example of a kettle lake, one created by a melted piece of ice broken off from a glacier.

The ponds and surrounding habitat are a resting point for large numbers of migratory birds.

== Gallery ==
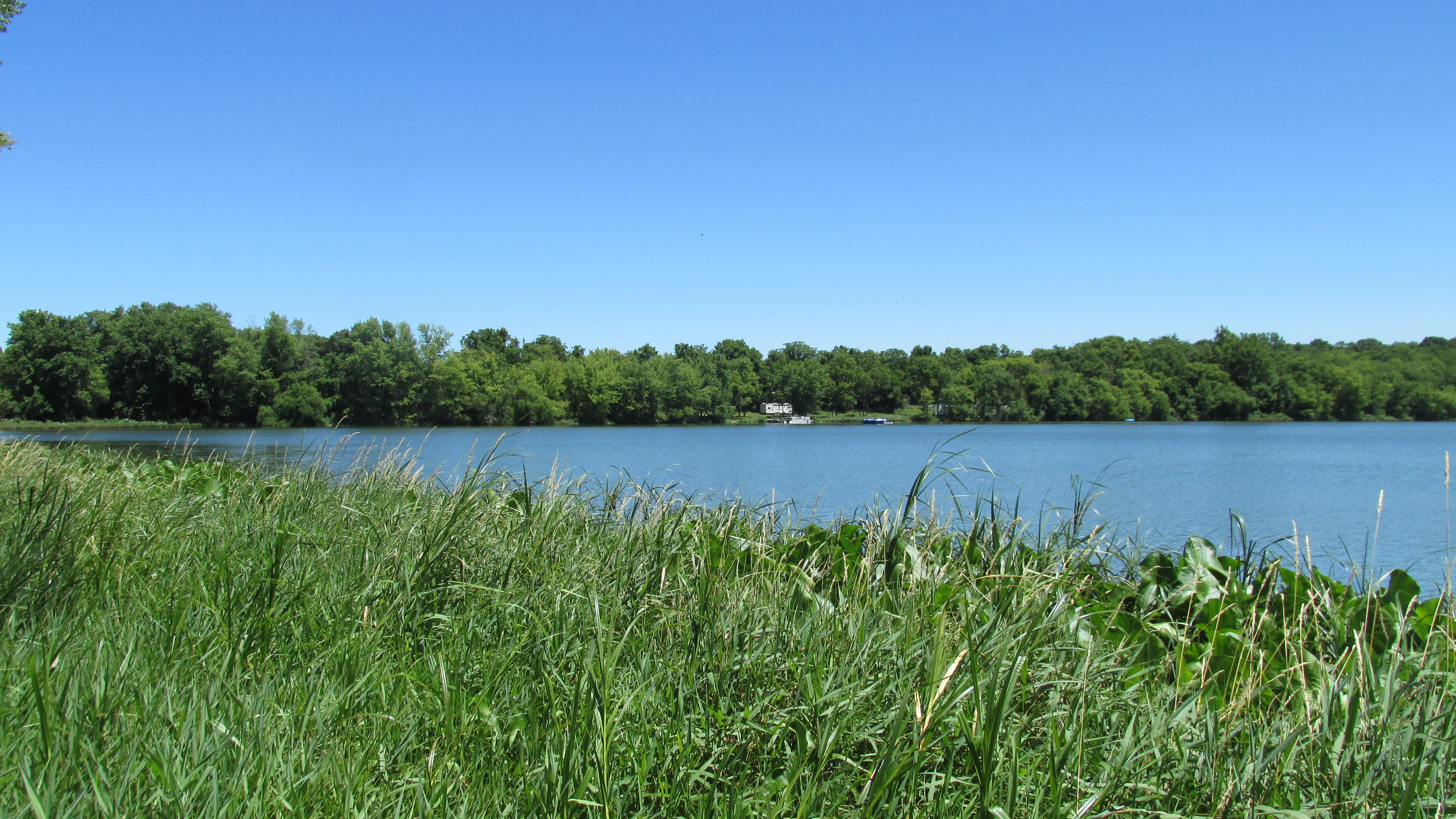
Stage's Pond

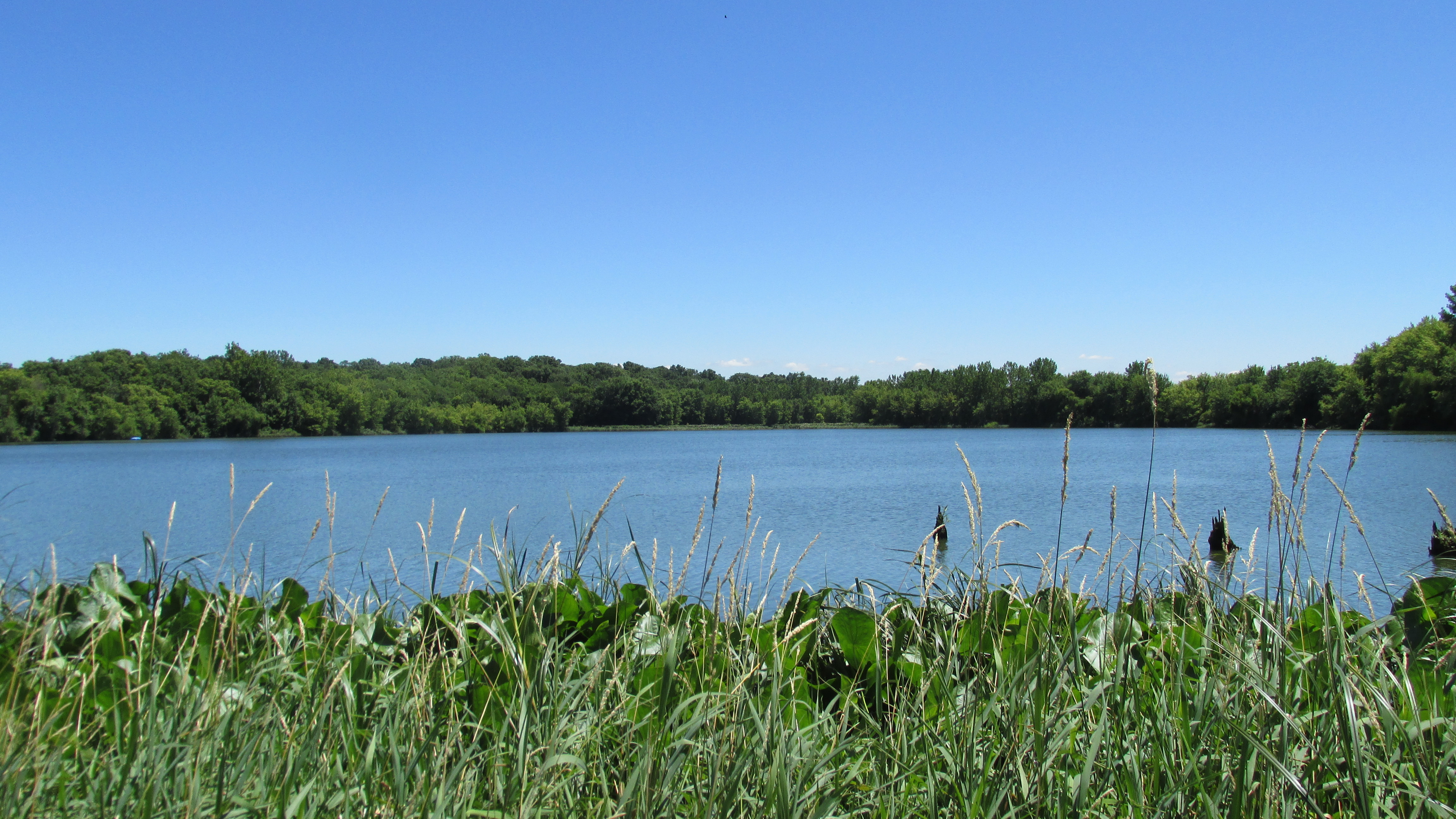
Stage's Pond

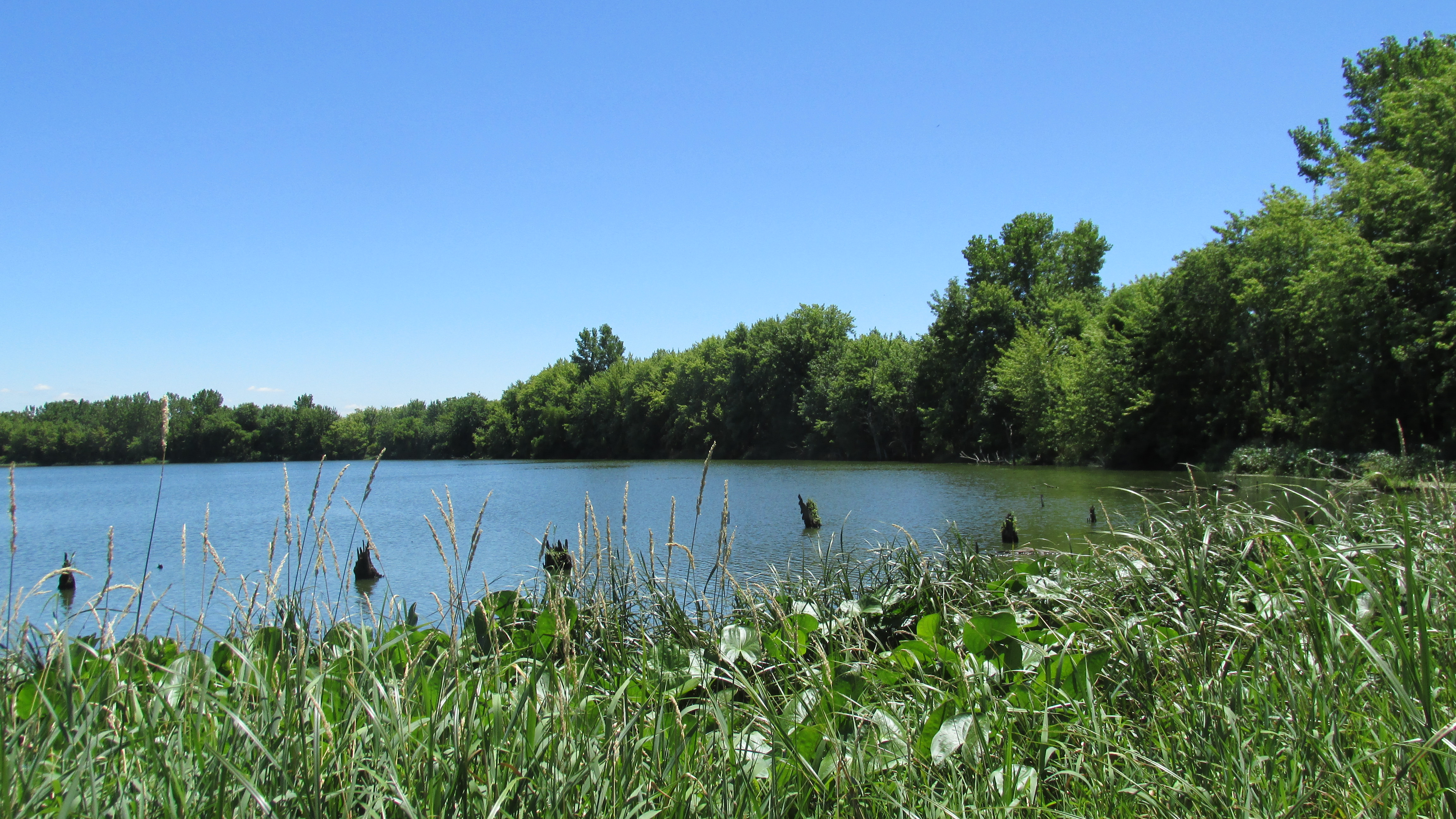
Stage's Pond
