= Circleville Historic District =

Historic district in Circleville, Ohio

- U.S. National Register of Historic Places
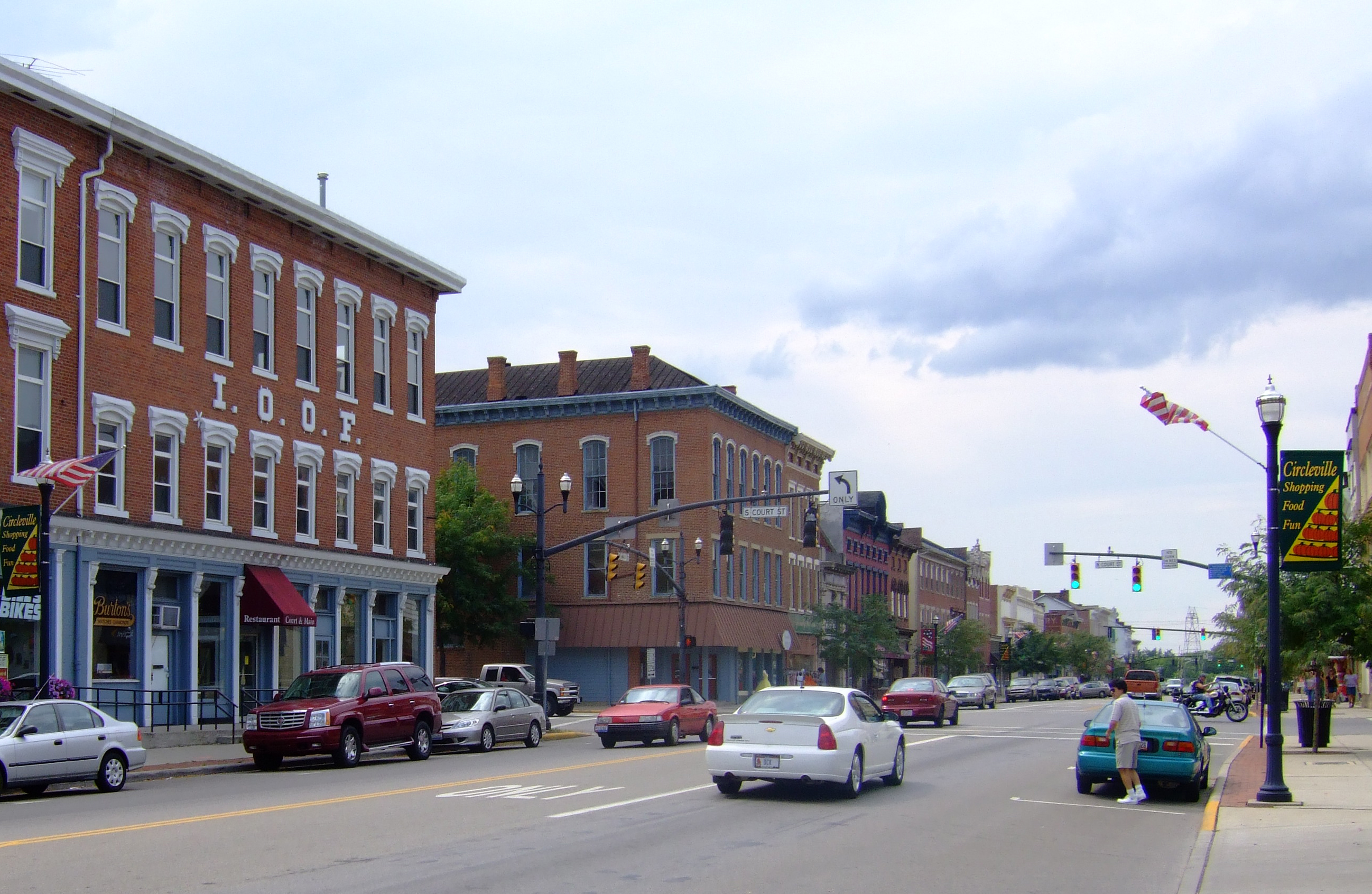
- View along Main Street

- Location within Ohio
- Location: Main and Court Sts., Circleville, Ohio
- Coordinates: 39.60190°N 82.94510°W
- Area: 35 acres (14 ha)
- Architect: William Doan, Daniel Driesbach and others
- Architectural style: Mid-19th Century Revival styles, Late Victorian
- NRHP reference No.: 78002171
- Added to NRHP: May 16, 1978

The Circleville Historic District in Circleville, Ohio in Pickaway County, Ohio is a historic district which was listed on the National Register of Historic Places in 1978. Its 35 acres (14 ha) area included 69 contributing buildings.

The district's (and Circleville's) center is the Pickaway County Courthouse. Circleville's original layout was designed to have streets radiating away from it, and it was to be enclosed by two concentric circular streets. By 1860, the "circle was squared" by subsequent development and alterations to property lines.

The district has numerous examples of Late Victorian architecture, including of Queen Anne and Italianate styles.

== Locations ==
Selected buildings are:

- Pickaway County Courthouse (1847, 1896). This was built in 1847 as a small Greek Revival-style courthouse. It was extensively modified in 1896 by architects Weary & Kramer, so much so that the original building was almost entirely concealed. It has smooth stone pilasters, a hipped roof, and a square tower.

- Circleville City Hall (1861), also known as "Circleville City Building". This was designed by local architect William Doane in "Romano-Tuscan style" (i.e. Italianate style?). As common in Italianate architecture in the United States, it has eaves ostensibly supported by decorative wooden brackets and a wooden cupola. It was in excellent condition in 1977. William Doane also designed the William Marshall Anderson House, also in Circleville and National Register-listed.
- Sheriff's Office & Jail (c.1890). This was at first a two-story brick-and-stone Queen Anne-style house with a round tower at its northeast corner. It was later converted to hold the sheriff's office, and a jail was added in a three-story brick extension to the rear.

- Masonic Lodge (1876), 113-115 W. Main St. Italianate, brick-and-stone, four-story building designed by J.T. Harris of Columbus. Its upper two floors were used for Masonic lodge purposes.
- The People's Bank (a.k.a. Marfield Bank) (1848), 133-135 W. Main St. This was operated as a bank by Samuel Marfield until 1877. According to the National Register nomination, this "2-story brick and stone building is the only remaining structure with a portion of its property line still part of the original circular pattern [of Circleville's original layout]." The Pickaway County Historical Society restored it in 1972.
- The Olds Building (a.k.a. Old Masonic Lodge) (1837), 115-119 W. Main St. Three-story brick building with parapet walls. In 1977 its first floor held two businesses "which have been there since the mid-1800's."

- Pythian Castle, 118 N. Court St.
- Circleville Post Office, 224 S. Court St. The post office was not mentioned in the 1977 National Register nomination as a contributing building, nor is it mentioned as an intrusion, but it is included within the district's boundaries.
- Moore House (1818, 1844, 1870), 304 S. Court St. Brick house with bracketed cornice and bracketed hoods over its doors. It was modified in 1844 by Samuel Moore (d.1902) who was "one of the most outstanding and public spirited citizens of Circleville." In 1977 the house was still owned by Moore family members.
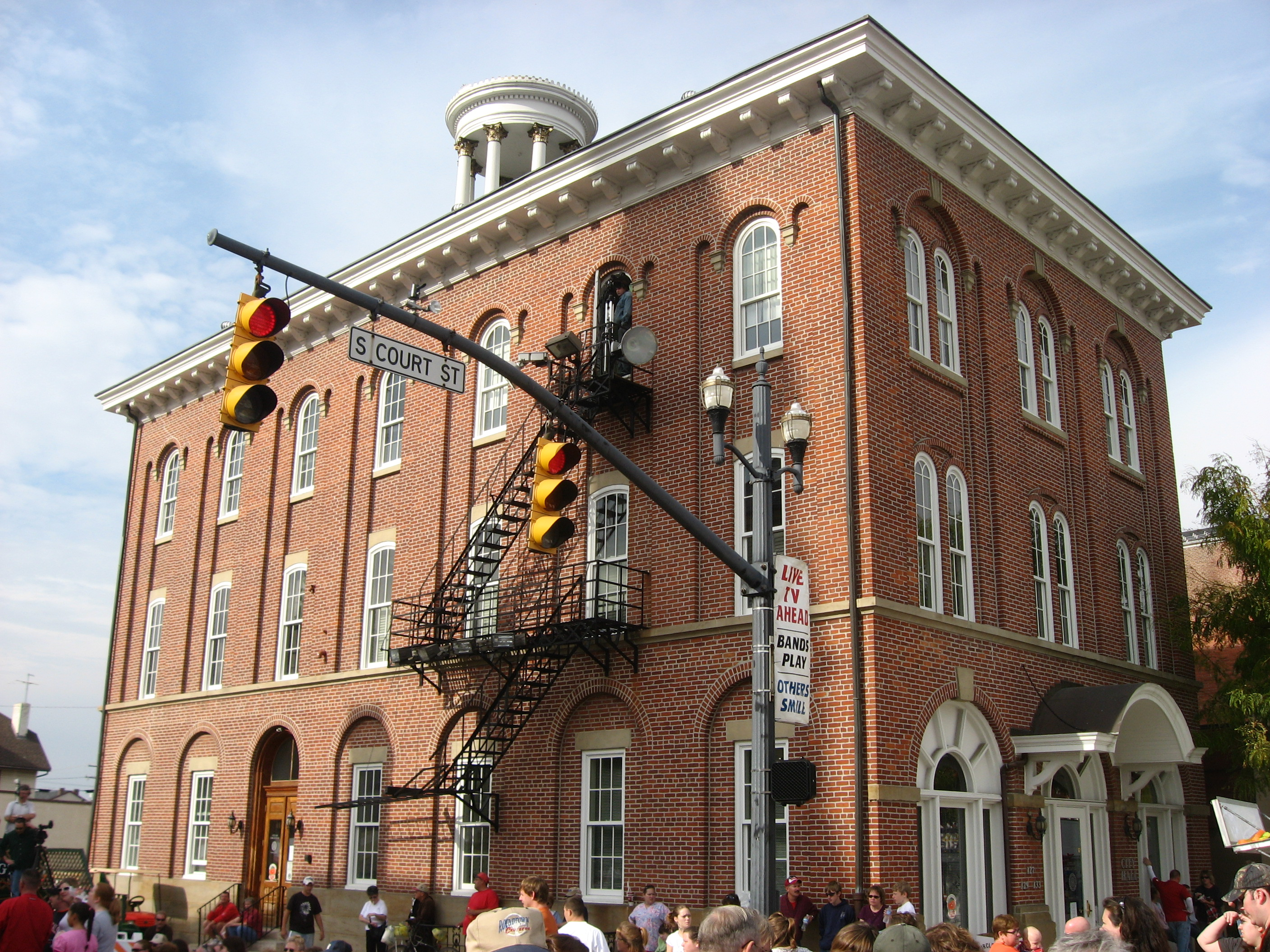
Circleville City Building, a.k.a. Circleville City Hall

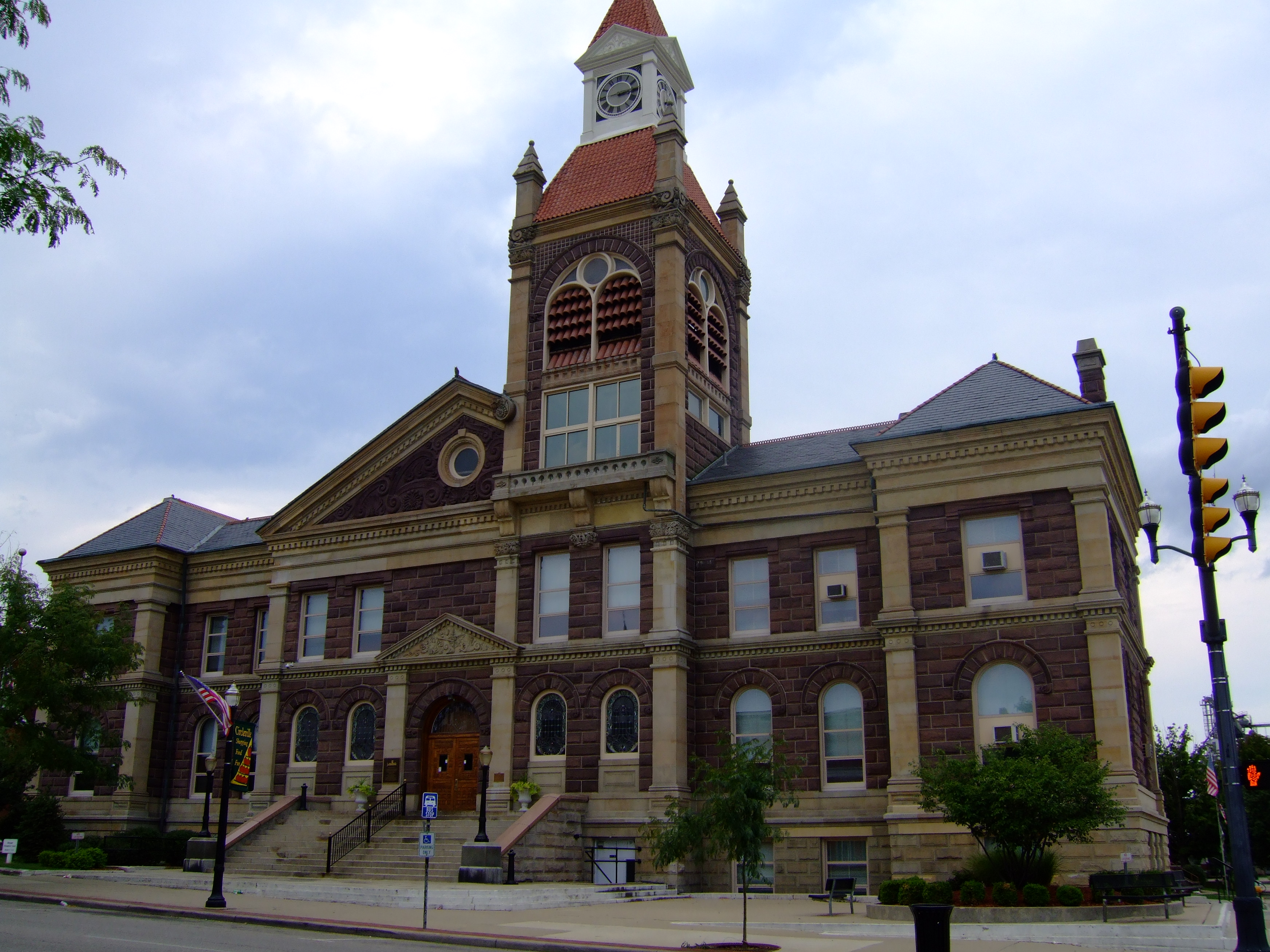
Pickaway County Courthouse

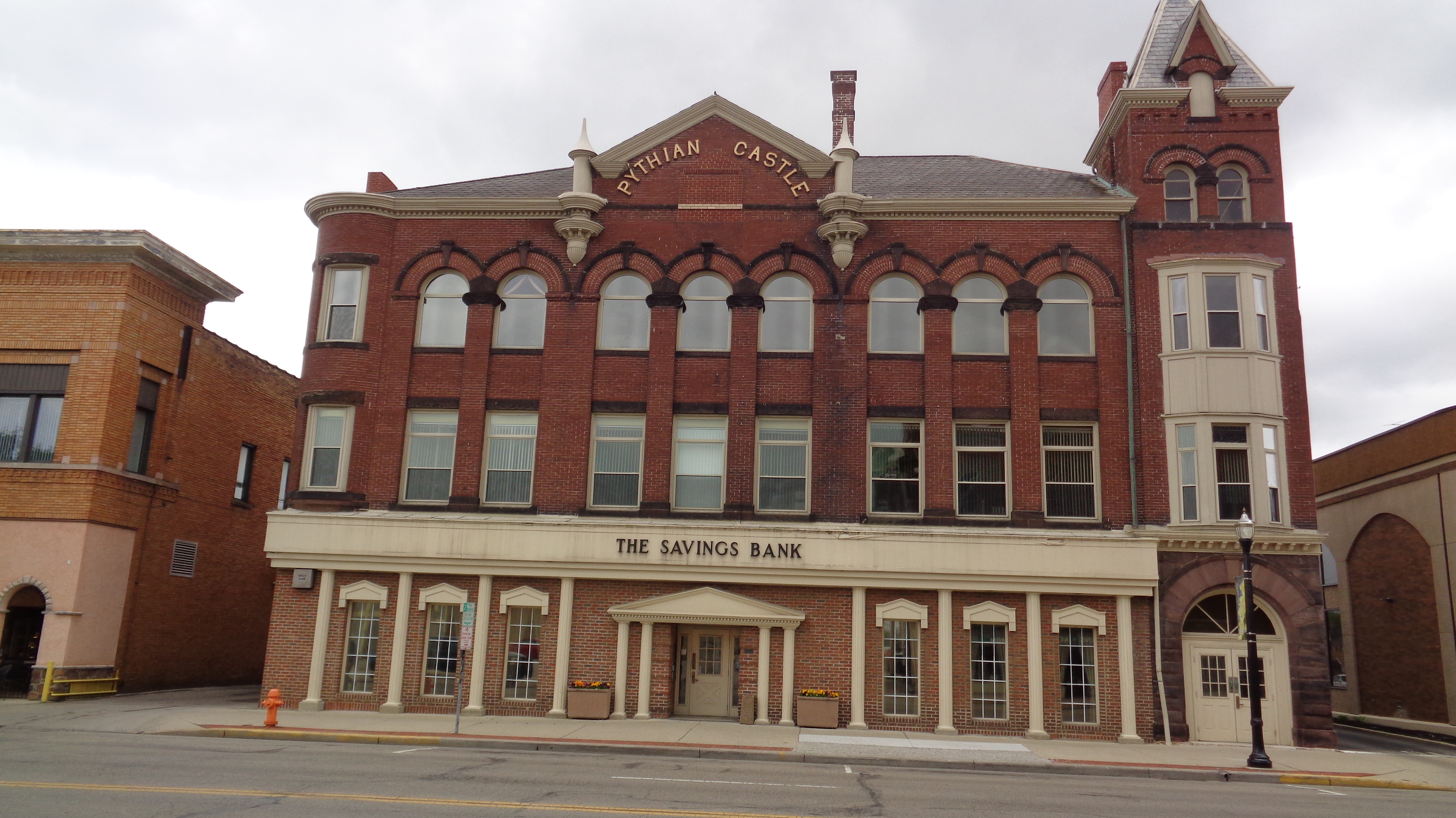
Pythian Castle

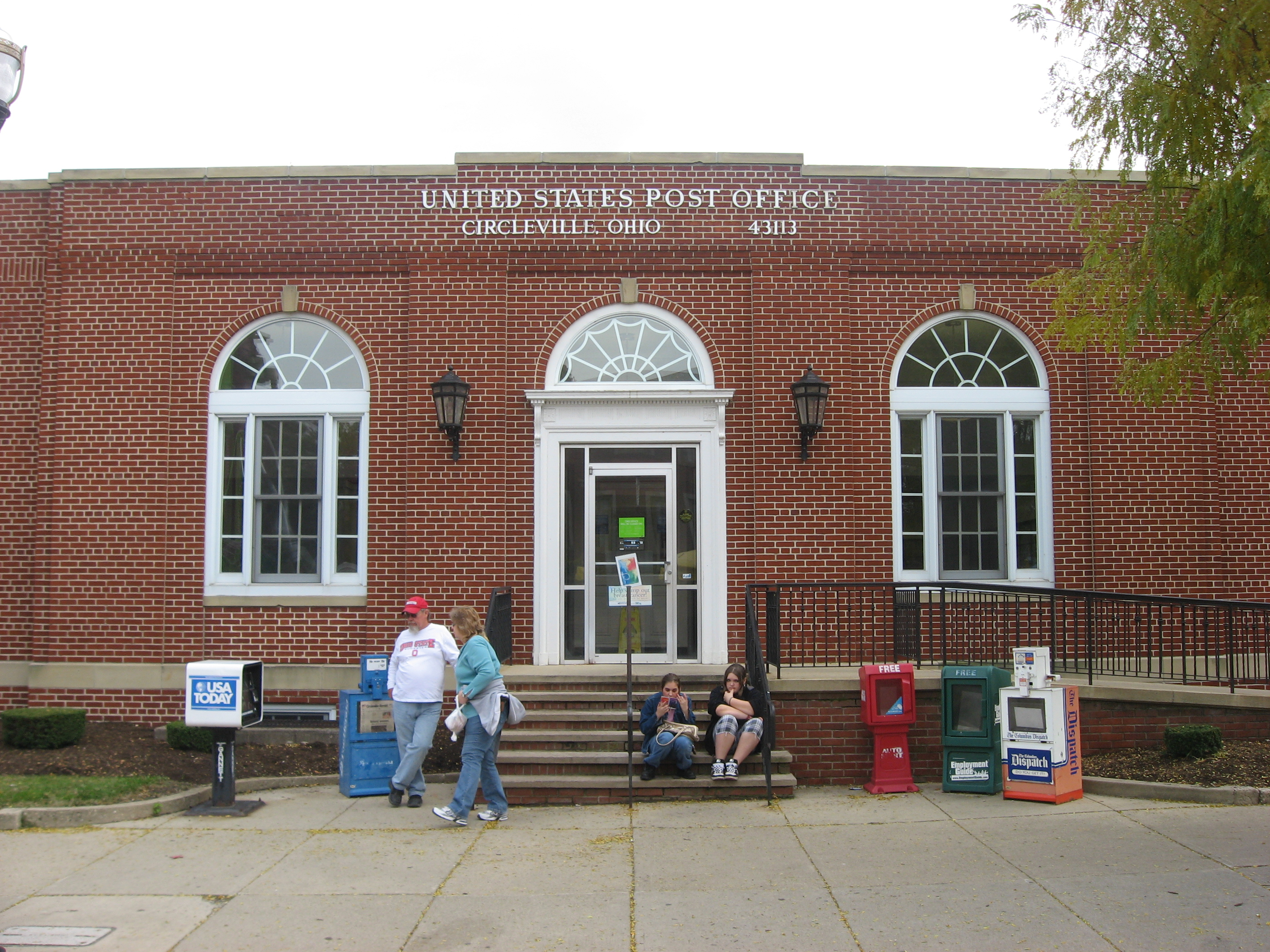
Circleville Post Office

== See also ==
- National Register of Historic Places listings in Pickaway County, Ohio, including several individually listed buildings in Circleville
