= Ashville, Louisville =

Neighborhood in Louisville, Kentucky

Coordinates: 38.1340°N 85.5791°W

Ashville is a neighborhood of Louisville, Kentucky centered along Bardstown Road (US 31E) and Brentlinger Lane. It is located near the Gene Snyder Freeway.
