= Gregg-Crites Octagon House =

Historic house in Ohio, United States

Coordinates: 39°35′8″N 82°56′31″W

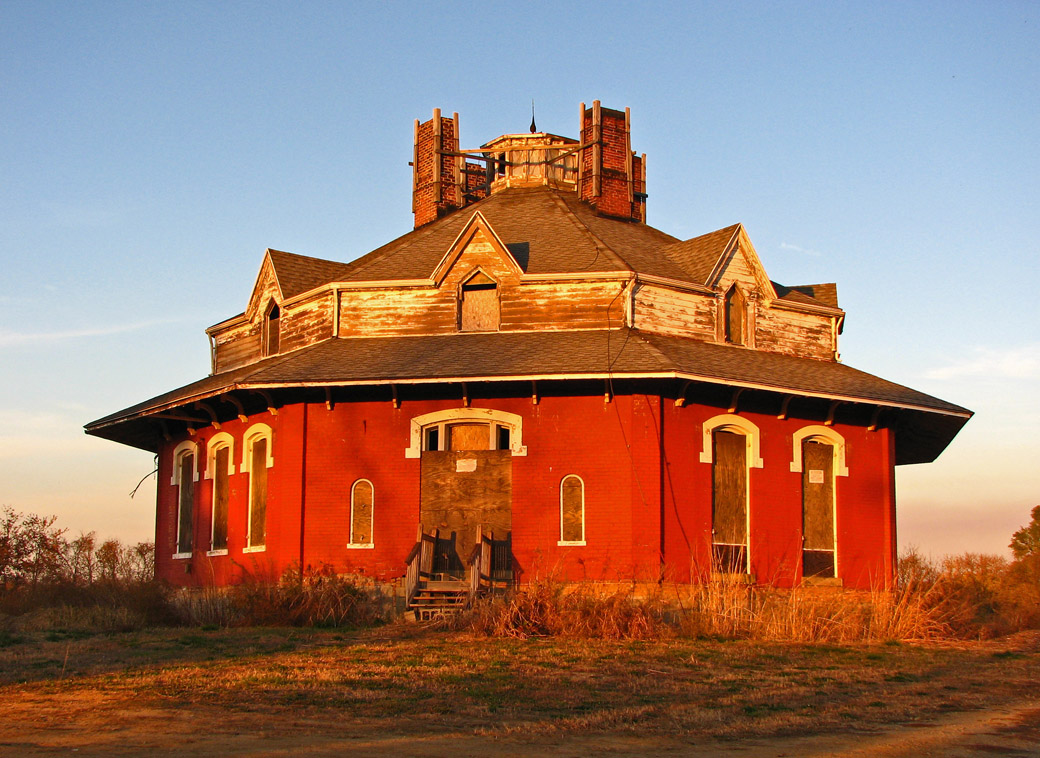
- The house in 2008
- Interactive map of the Gregg-Crites Octagon House area

General information
- Architectural style: Octagon mode
- Location: Circleville, Ohio, United States
- Construction started: 1855
- Completed: 1856
- Client: George Gregg

Technical details
- Structural system: Brick, timber frame upper floor

The Gregg-Crites house, also known as the M. M. Crites house, is an octagon house located in Circleville, Ohio, on Route 23 just south of town. It was built by George Gregg between 1855 and 1856 and now owned by The Roundtown Conservancy. It was listed on the National Register of Historic Places in 2021.

== Relocation ==
In the early 2000s the farm on which the house stood was acquired by a developer for a new Wal-Mart Supercenter, and the house was scheduled for demolition.

After some concerted and expensive action by the Roundtown Conservancy, the 480 ton house (minus its basement) was moved intact to a new location. In order to move the house, steel beams were inserted into the basement, bolted together on site to make a rigid base, and mounted on a hydraulic mechanism with 96 wheels in sets of four. The site donated for relocation was half a mile away, and the self-adjusting hydraulics were necessary to transport the house over uneven ground. The move took place on February 14–15, 2004, and was successful in avoiding damage to the brickwork and the fragile central staircase.

At its new site, the house was set on a concrete foundation which had been prepared for it. The Roundtown Conservancy plans to restore the building and possibly use it as a museum.

== Layout ==
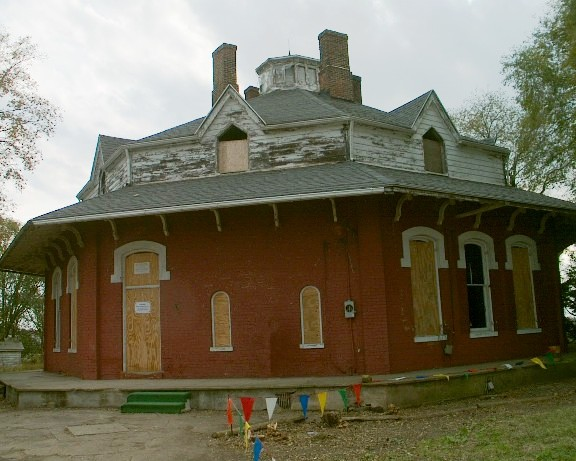
The house in 2003, in its original location on the MM Crites farm.

The house has an impressive circular hall with a central spiral stair. There are five main rooms on the first floor, eight equal bedrooms, and a small room in the lantern.

== See also ==
- List of octagon houses
- National Register of Historic Places listings in Pickaway County, Ohio
