= Stevenson Peters House =

- U.S. National Register of Historic Places
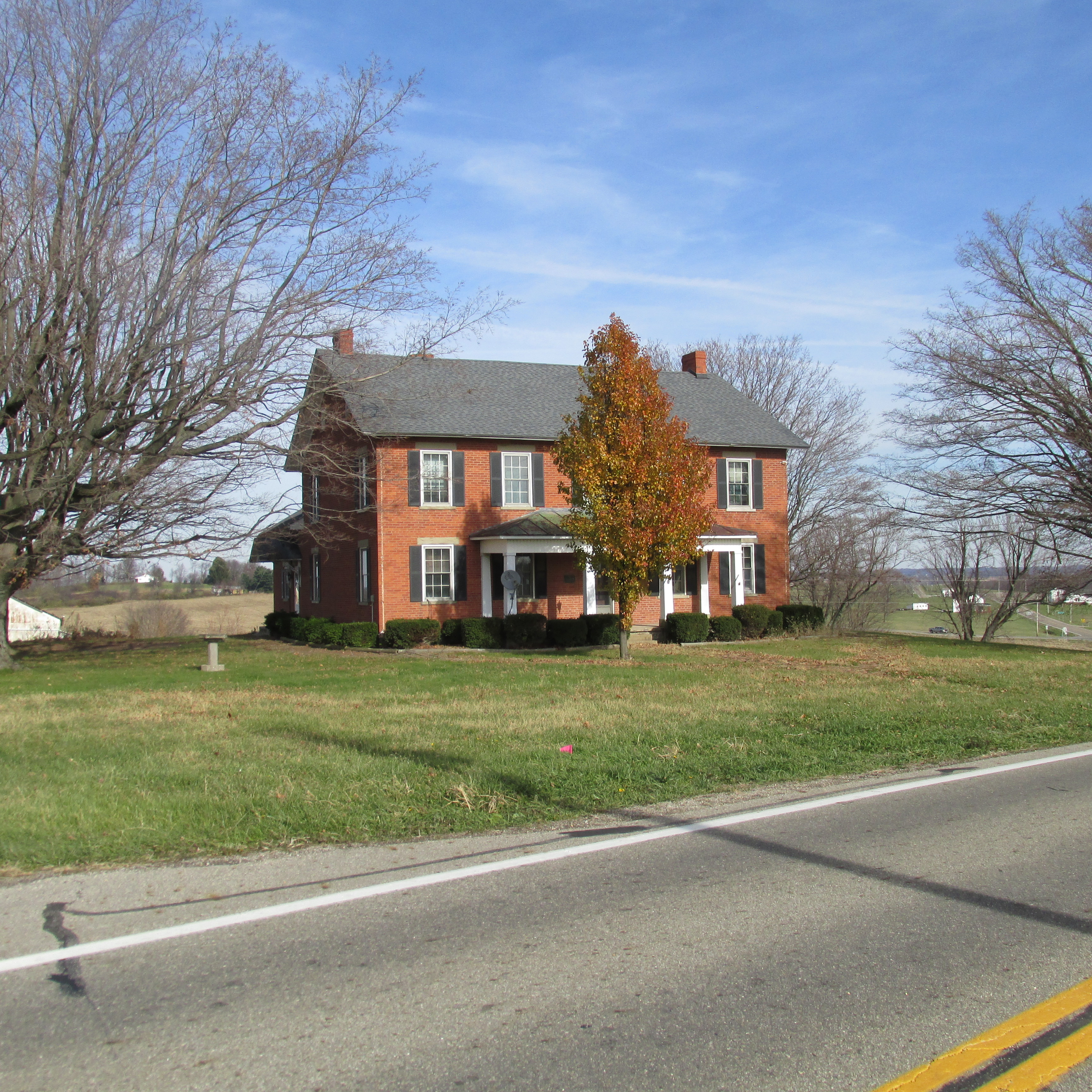
- Front of the house

- Location within Ohio Location within the United States
- Location: 9860 State Route 188, northeast of Circleville, Ohio
- Coordinates: 39°40′29″N 82°50′17″W
- Area: 2 acres (0.81 ha)
- Built: 1852
- NRHP reference No.: 84003797
- Added to NRHP: February 9, 1984

The Stevenson Peters House is a historic farm complex near the city of Circleville in Pickaway County, Ohio, United States. Built in the mid-19th century, the complex has been named a historic site.

Stevenson Peters was descended from one of Pickaway County's earliest families of settlers. By the mid-19th century, Peters had made himself one of Walnut Township's most extensive landowners. On the present property he erected the present house in 1852, and here he resided until his death in 1887. Later generations of the Peters family owned the property until 1978, when it was inherited by a family named Bartholomew. Accordingly, it has also been known as the "Peters-Bartholomew Residence."

Peters' farmhouse is a brick double-pen building with four-over-four windows, two-and-a-half stories tall and five bays wide. Because of its location on a hill, the house appears especially large to the viewer and can be seen from a particularly long distance. Nine additional buildings are located on the farmstead, which encompasses approximately 2 acres (0.81 ha) around the house.

In 1984, the Peters House was listed on the National Register of Historic Places, qualifying because of its distinctive historic architecture. Six of the ten buildings on the farmstead qualified as contributing properties, while the other four were deemed non-contributing. Particularly crucial to this designation was its four-over-four design, which represented an uncommon variation in its rural area.
