= Walnut Township, Pickaway County, Ohio =

Township in Ohio, US

- Township
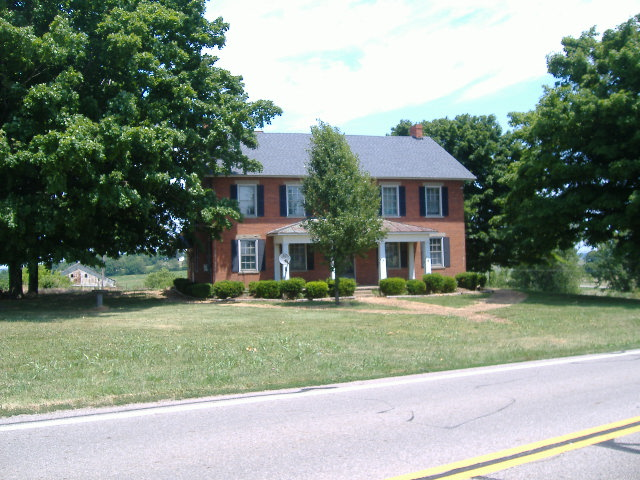
- The Stevenson Peters House, a historic site in the township

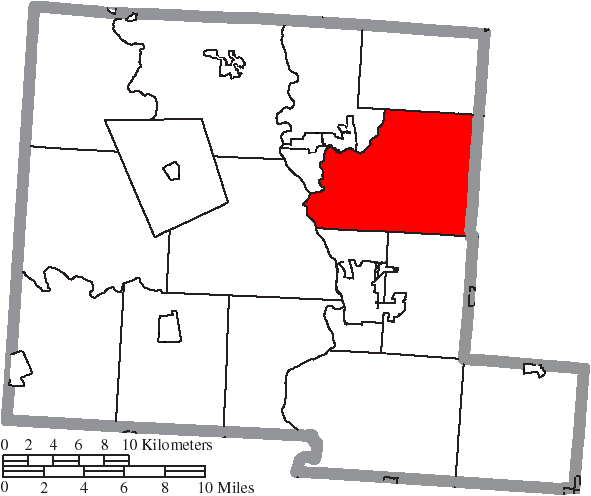
- Location of Walnut Township in Pickaway County
- Coordinates: 39°41′26″N 82°53′56″W
- Country: United States
- State: Ohio
- County: Pickaway

Area
  - Total: 40.9 sq mi (105.9 km^{2})
  - Land: 40.8 sq mi (105.6 km^{2})
  - Water: 0.12 sq mi (0.3 km^{2})
- Elevation: 801 ft (244 m)

Population (2020)
  - Total: 2,962
  - Density: 73/sq mi (28/km^{2})
- Time zone: UTC-5 (Eastern (EST))
  - Summer (DST): UTC-4 (EDT)
- FIPS code: 39-80598
- GNIS feature ID: 1086804
- Website: https://walnuttownshippickawayohio.com/

Walnut Township is one of the fifteen townships of Pickaway County, Ohio, United States. The 2020 census found 2,962 people in the township.

== Geography ==
Located in the northeastern part of the county, it borders the following townships:

- Madison Township - north
- Bloom Township, Fairfield County - northeast corner
- Amanda Township, Fairfield County - east
- Washington Township - south
- Circleville Township - southwest
- Jackson Township - west
- Harrison Township - northwest

No municipalities are located in Walnut Township.

Stage's Pond State Nature Preserve, a 178-acre nature preserve with ponds, is located in Walnut Township.

== Name and history ==
Statewide, other Walnut Townships are located in Fairfield and Gallia Counties.

== Government ==
The township is governed by a three-member board of trustees, who are elected in November of odd-numbered years to a four-year term beginning on the following January 1. Two are elected in the year after the presidential election and one is elected in the year before it. There is also an elected township fiscal officer, who serves a four-year term beginning on April 1 of the year after the election, which is held in November of the year before the presidential election. Vacancies in the fiscal officership or on the board of trustees are filled by the remaining trustees.
