= USS Asheville =

Four ships of the United States Navy have been named Asheville after Asheville, North Carolina.

- USS Asheville (PG-21), was a gunboat that served in the Caribbean and off the China coast, and was sunk by Japanese forces early in World War II.
- USS Asheville (PF-1), an Asheville-class patrol frigate, served on the East Coast doing escort duties during World War II.
- USS Asheville (PGM-84), a high-speed gunboat, served in the Vietnam War.
- USS Asheville (SSN-758), is a Los Angeles-class submarine, currently in service.
