= Redlands (Circleville, Ohio) =

Historic house in Ohio, United States

- U.S. National Register of Historic Places
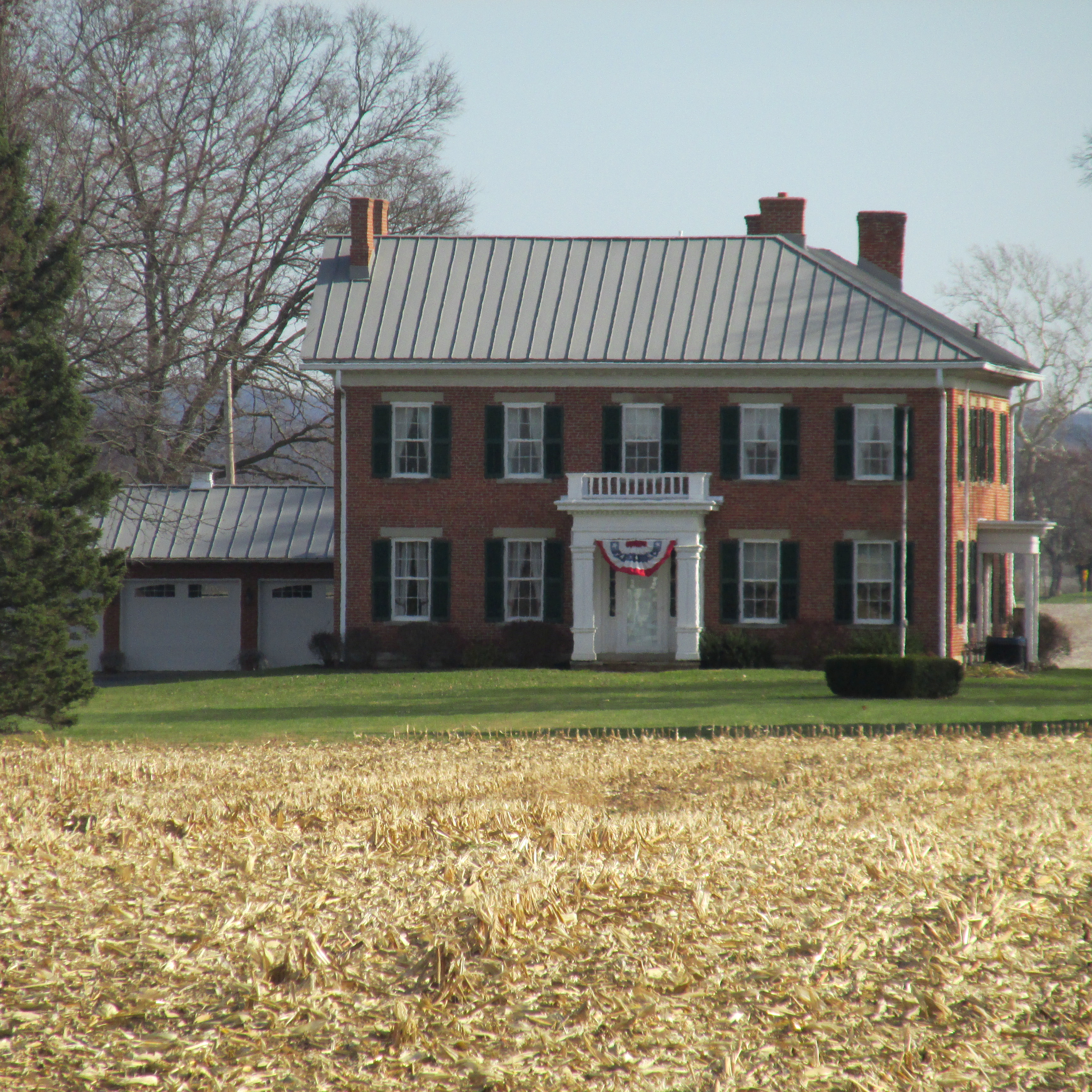
- View from Court Street

- Location within Ohio Location within the United States
- Location: 1960 N. Court St., north of Circleville, Ohio
- Coordinates: 39°38′6″N 82°56′31″W
- Area: 4 acres (1.6 ha)
- Built: 1858
- Architectural style: Greek Revival
- NRHP reference No.: 82003630
- Added to NRHP: May 14, 1982

Redlands is a historic farmhouse near the city of Circleville in the south-central part of the U.S. state of Ohio. A grand home built in the middle of the 19th century, it has been named a historic site.

Constructed in 1858, Redlands was originally the home of one of Pickaway County's more prosperous farmers, Jacob Valentine. The farmhouse itself is a brick structure, built of bricks manufactured on the farm; its foundation and minor elements are stone, and additional buildings on the property are weatherboarded. Its construction and its numerous decorative elements combine to make it typical of estates built for wealthy southern Ohio landowners soon before the Civil War. Particularly significant among these elements are the Greek Revival front porch, transoms above the windows and doors, its prominent fireplaces, and its grand front stairway.

Besides the residence, the farmstead comprises three outbuildings: two historic buildings, which are vernacular structures that had been completed by 1860, and one that lacks historic integrity. In 1982, Redlands was listed on the National Register of Historic Places, qualifying because of its well-preserved historic architecture; the house and the two historic outbuildings were ranked as contributing, and the non-historic outbuilding was considered non-contributing. Crucial to the farm's designation was its status as an intact gentleman's estate from the end of the pre-Civil War period.
