= Luthor List Mound =

Archaeological site in Ohio, United States

- U.S. National Register of Historic Places
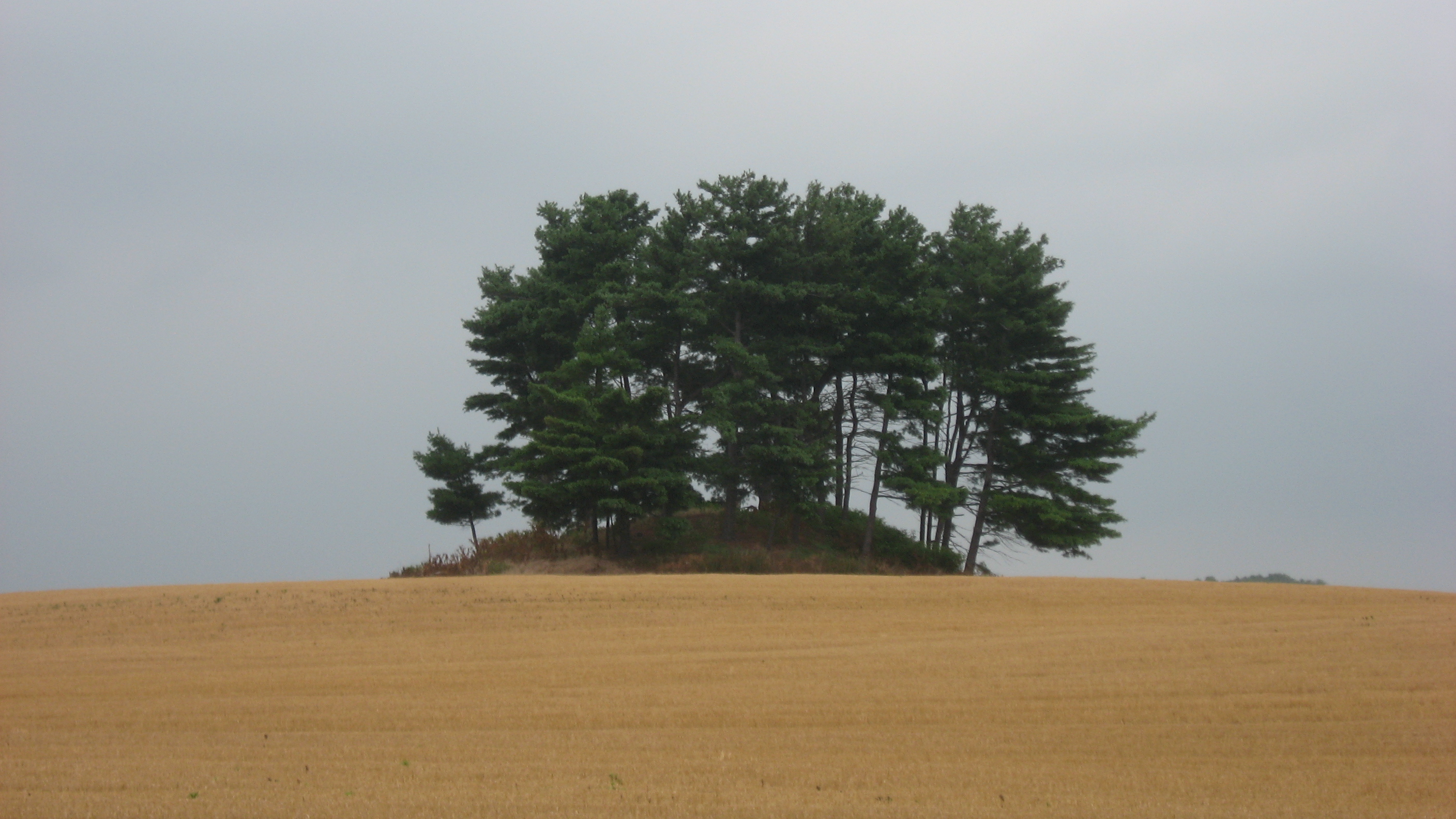
- Southern side of the mound

- Location within Ohio Location within the United States
- Location: Southeast of Circleville along the Kingston Pike
- Nearest city: Circleville, Ohio
- Coordinates: 39°34′31″N 82°55′29″W
- Area: 2 acres (0.81 ha)
- NRHP reference No.: 74001592
- Added to NRHP: October 16, 1974

The Luthor List Mound (also known as the "Burning Mound" or the "Signal Mound") is an archaeological site of the Adena culture in the southern part of the U.S. state of Ohio. Located in Pickaway County near the city of Circleville, this Native American mound sits along the Kingston Pike, southeast of Circleville in Circleville Township.

As one of the largest burial mounds in Pickaway County, the Luthor List Mound is believed to contain the skeletons of many leading members of the society that built it. The mound's location on top of a small ridge, far from major bodies of water, is indicative that it was built by Adenan peoples, who often buried their chieftains in mounds such as the Luthor List Mound. Such mounds were typically built in stages: individuals would be buried within small mounds, and the resulting mound cluster would be covered with earth and converted into a single large mound.

Unlike many of the region's conical mounds, the Luthor List Mound has seen very little damage since white settlement of the region. Located on a ridgeline, the mound sits at an elevation of 735 feet (224 m). With a diameter of at least 75 feet (23 m) in all directions, it is 12 feet (3.7 m) high; the erosion caused by the plows of past farmers has not damaged the Luthor List Mound because of its location — sitting atop the ridgeline and covered with trees, it is not an ideal farming location. In recognition of its archaeological value, the Luthor List Mound was listed on the National Register of Historic Places in 1974.
