= Circleville Township, Ohio =

Township in Ohio, US

Circleville Township, Pickaway County, Ohio
- Township
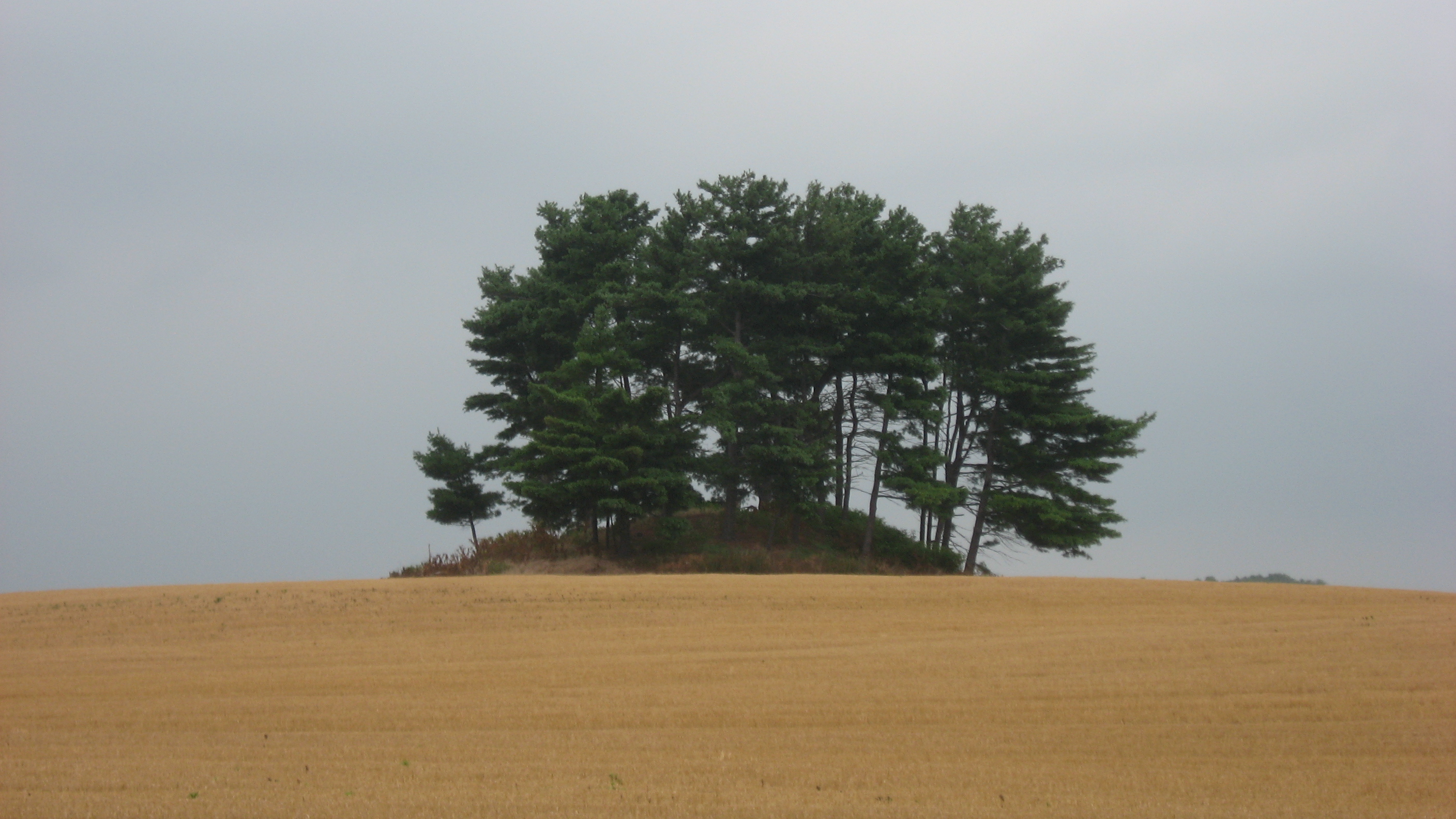
- The Luthor List Mound, a historic site in the township

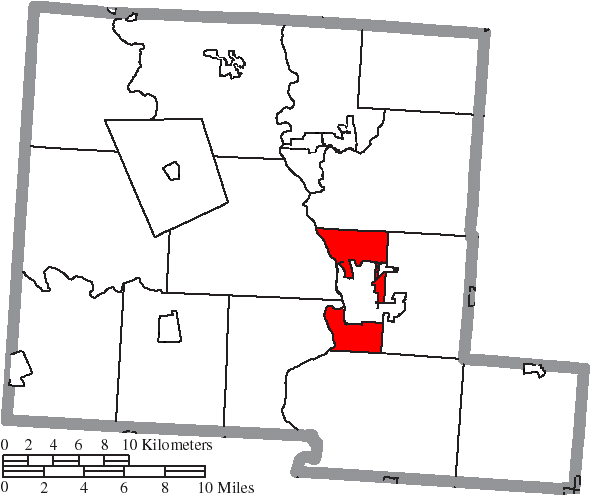
- Location of Circleville Township in Pickaway County
- Coordinates: 39°36′30″N 82°56′56″W
- Country: United States
- State: Ohio
- County: Pickaway

Area
  - Total: 10.1 sq mi (26.2 km^{2})
  - Land: 9.9 sq mi (25.7 km^{2})
  - Water: 0.23 sq mi (0.6 km^{2})
- Elevation: 692 ft (211 m)

Population (2020)
  - Total: 2,531
  - Density: 255/sq mi (98.5/km^{2})
- Time zone: UTC-5 (Eastern (EST))
  - Summer (DST): UTC-4 (EDT)
- ZIP code: 43113
- Area code: 740
- FIPS code: 39-15077
- GNIS feature ID: 1086792
- Website: https://www.circlevilletwp.com/

Circleville Township is one of the fifteen townships of Pickaway County, Ohio, United States. The 2020 census found 2,531 people in the township.

== Geography ==
Located in the eastern part of the county, it borders the following townships:

- Walnut Township - north
- Washington Township - east
- Perry Township - south
- Wayne Township - southwest
- Jackson Township - northwest

Central Circleville Township is occupied by the city of Circleville, the county seat of Pickaway County. In southwestern Circleville Township is located the census-designated place of Logan Elm Village.

== Name and history ==
It is the only Circleville Township statewide.

Circleville Township was organized in 1833.

== Government ==
The township is governed by a three-member board of trustees, who are elected in November of odd-numbered years to a four-year term beginning on the following January 1. Two are elected in the year after the presidential election and one is elected in the year before it. There is also an elected township fiscal officer, who serves a four-year term beginning on April 1 of the year after the election, which is held in November of the year before the presidential election. Vacancies in the fiscal officership or on the board of trustees are filled by the remaining trustees.
