= Crit =

Crit or CRIT may refer to:

== People ==
- Crit Luallen, Kentucky Auditor of Public Accounts and potential 2008 United States Senate candidate
- Colorado River Indian Tribes (CRIT), a Native American tribe headquartered in Parker, Arizona

== Places ==
- Criţ, a village in Buneşti Commune, Braşov County, Romania

== Academia ==
- Critical legal studies, a movement in legal thought
- Critical management studies, a group of politically left-wing and theoretically innovative approaches to management, business and organization
- Critical theory
- Critical theory (Frankfurt School), theory in the positivistic, scientistic, or purely observational mode
- Critical thinking

== Other ==
- Critic or critique
- Criterium or crit, bicycle race
- Critical hit, an especially successful attack in role-playing games and computer and video games
- Centro de Rehabilitación Infantil Teletón (CRIT)
- Hematocrit, a measure of proportion in blood volume

== See also ==
- Literary criticism, sometimes abbreviated as lit.
