= William Marshall Anderson House =

Historic house in Ohio, United States

- U.S. National Register of Historic Places
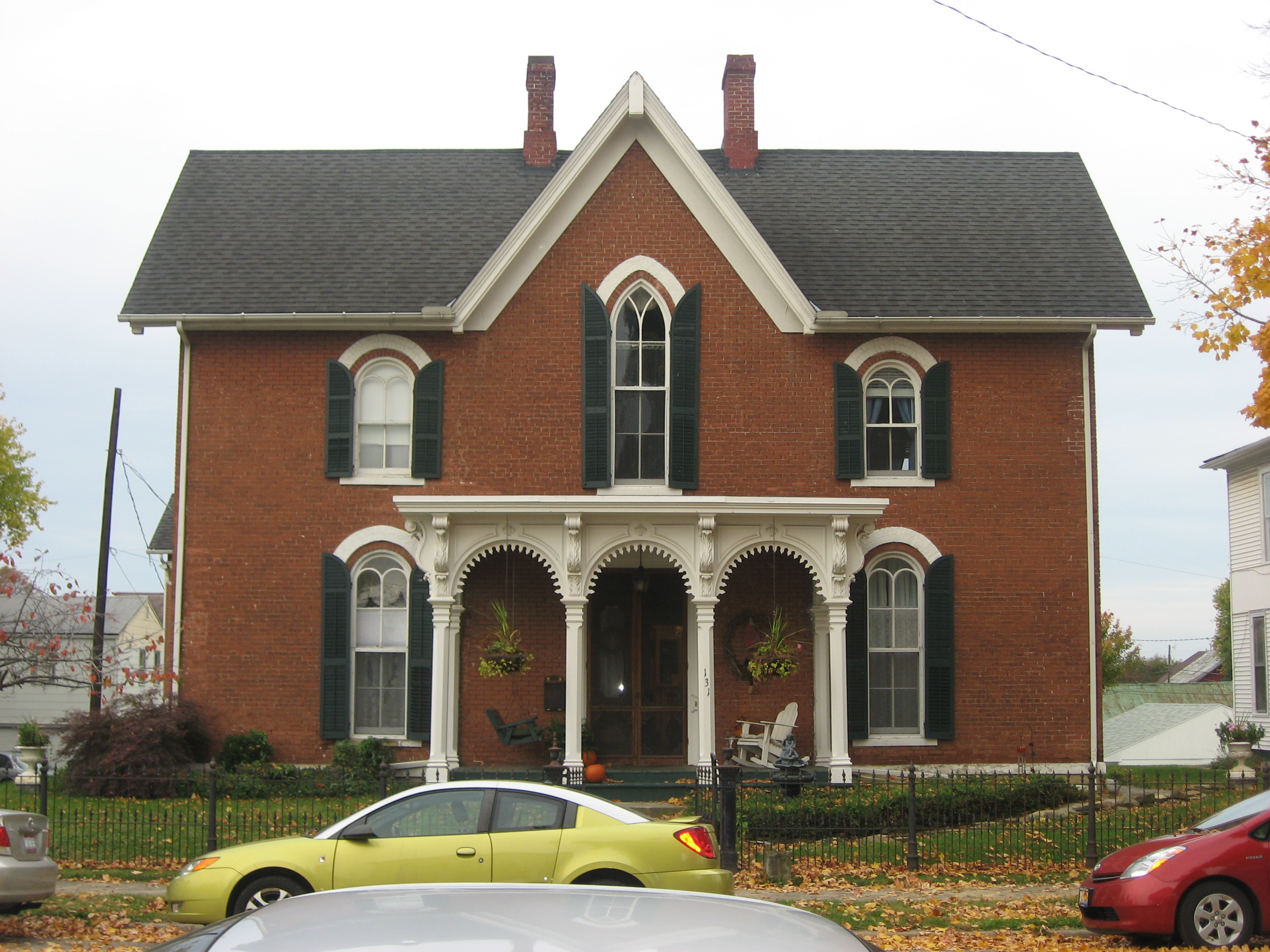
- Front of the house

- Location within Ohio Location within the United States
- Location: 131 W. Union St., Circleville, Ohio
- Coordinates: 39°35′57″N 82°56′50″W
- Area: Less than 1 acre (0.40 ha)
- Built: 1865
- Architect: William Doane
- Architectural style: Gothic Revival
- NRHP reference No.: 79001925
- Added to NRHP: November 29, 1979

The William Marshall Anderson House is a historic house in Circleville, Ohio, United States. Built in 1865 as the home of William Marshall Anderson, the house has been ranked as a leading example of Gothic Revival architecture. Walls of brick and wood, covered with an asphalt roof, are decorated with many features of this style, including ornate wooden trim and ogive windows. The house's well-preserved nineteenth-century architecture led to its placement on the National Register of Historic Places in 1979.

It may have been designed by William Doane, (Note: This may be William Howard Doane, a manufacturer of wood-working machinery who is more widely known as a hymn-writer and church leader, and whose home in Cincinnati also features wooden brackets under its eaves. The Circleville City Building (also known as Circleville City Hall, and listed on the National Register as contributing in the Circleville Historic District), was also designed by William Doan, and also features wooden brackets under its eaves.) a local architect who designed several schools and the Circleville City Hall.
