= West Asheville–Aycock School Historic District =

Historic district in North Carolina, United States

- U.S. National Register of Historic Places
- U.S. Historic district
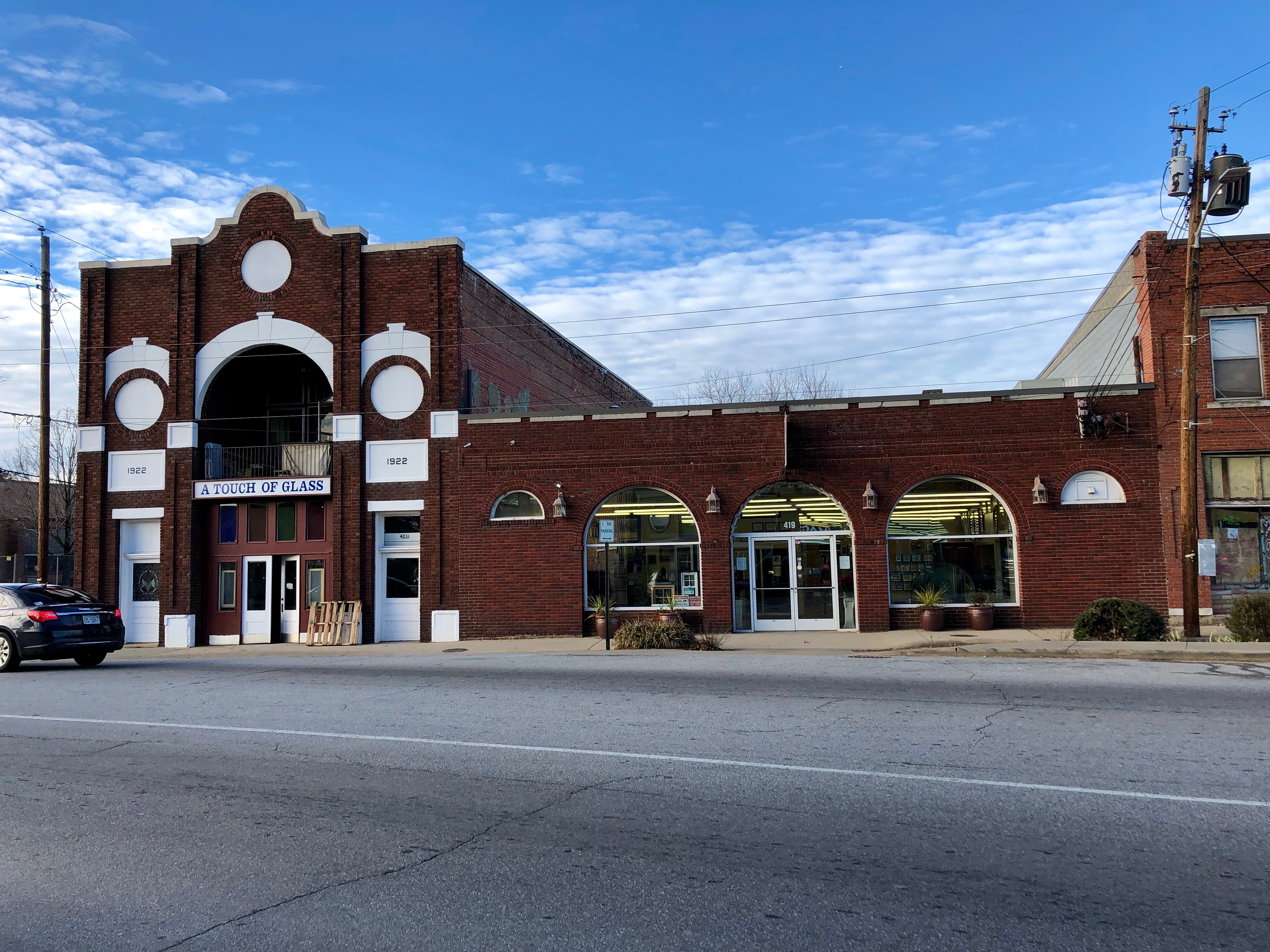
- West Asheville Fire Station & the Non-Contributing West Asheville Theater

- Location within North Carolina Location within the United States
- Location: 401-441 Haywood Rd., Asheville, North Carolina
- Coordinates: 35°34′42″N 82°34′53″W
- Area: 10 acres (4.0 ha)
- Architect: Six Associates Inc.
- Architectural style: Early Commercial, Classical Revival
- NRHP reference No.: 06000718 (original); 14000544 (increase)

Significant dates
- Added to NRHP: August 23, 2006
- Boundary increase: September 3, 2014

West Asheville–Aycock School Historic District is a national historic district located at Asheville, Buncombe County, North Carolina. The district encompasses 10 contributing buildings in a commercial and institutional section of West Asheville. It includes one and two-story brick civic and commercial buildings, dating from about 1915 to 1936. Their development was influenced by streetcar service along the Haywood Road corridor that operated from 1910 to 1934. Notable buildings contributing to the historic district include the McGeachy Filling Station (c. 1936), Buckner Building (c. 1924), West Asheville Fire Station (1922), Charles B. Aycock School (1953), West Asheville Bank and Trust Company (c. 1927), DeLuxe Barber Shop (1927), and Universal Motors (1928).

It was listed on the National Register of Historic Places in 2006.

== Gallery ==
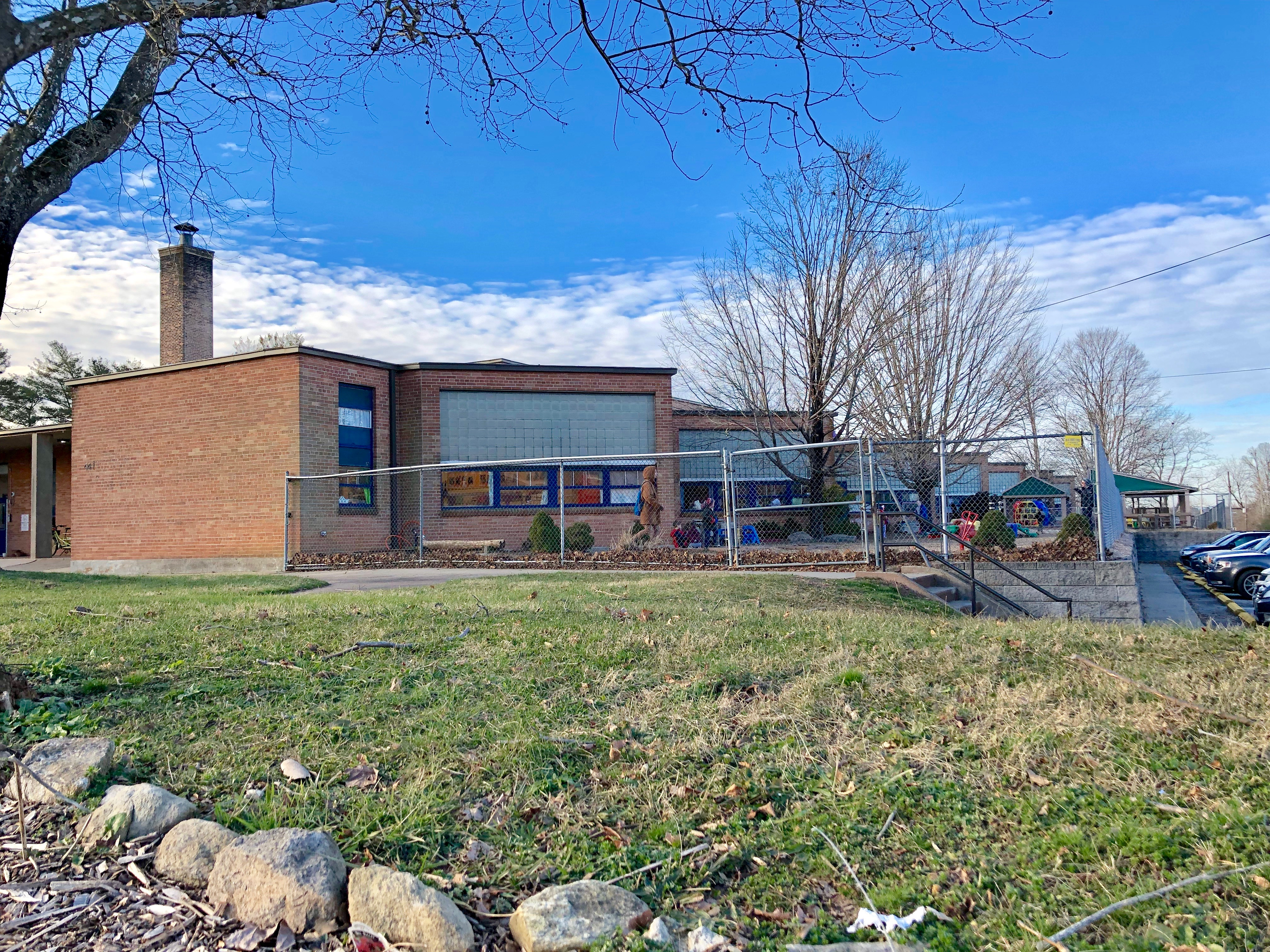
Charles B. Aycock School, 2019

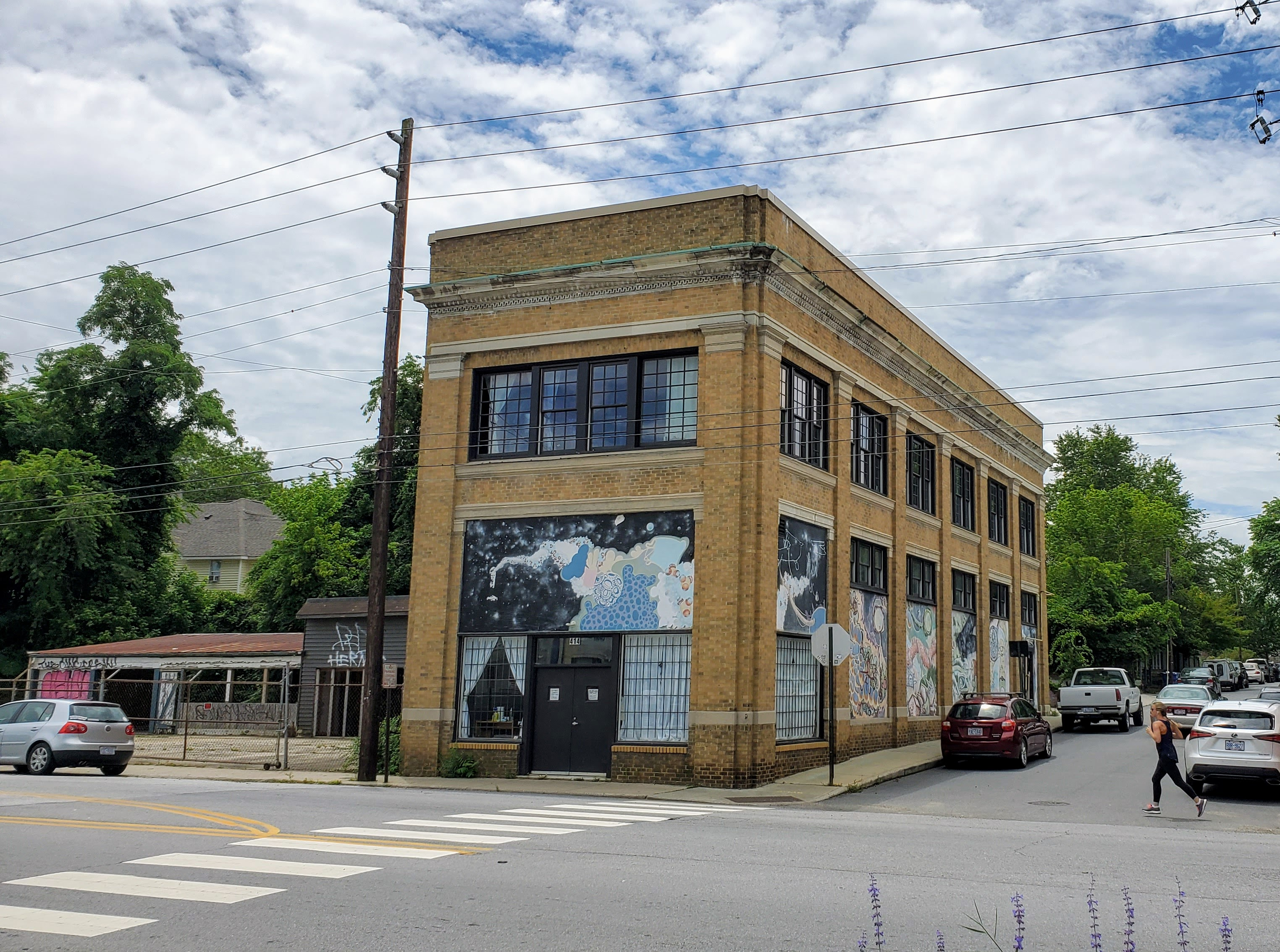
West Asheville Bank and Trust Company, 2021

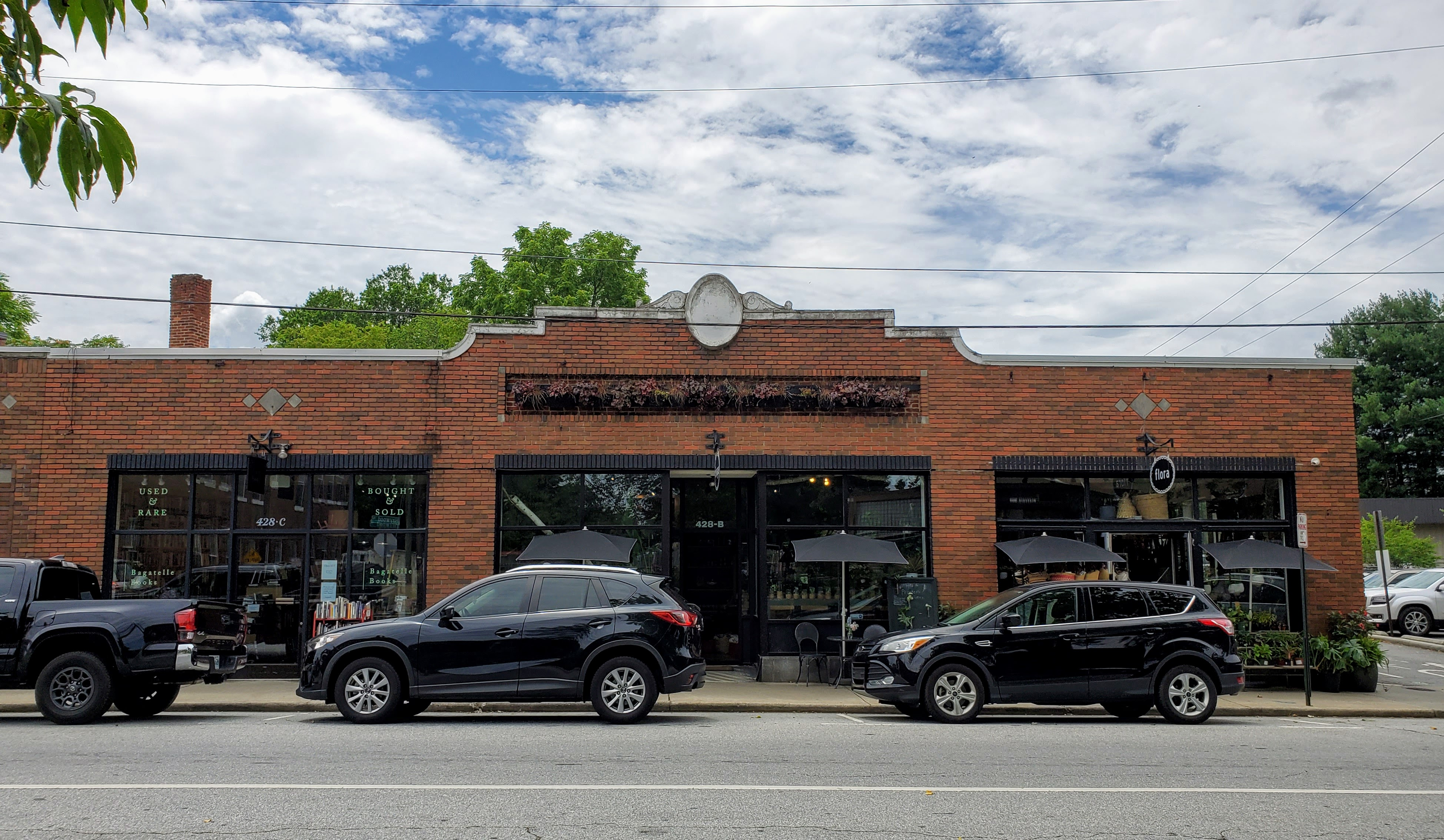
Universal Motors, 2021

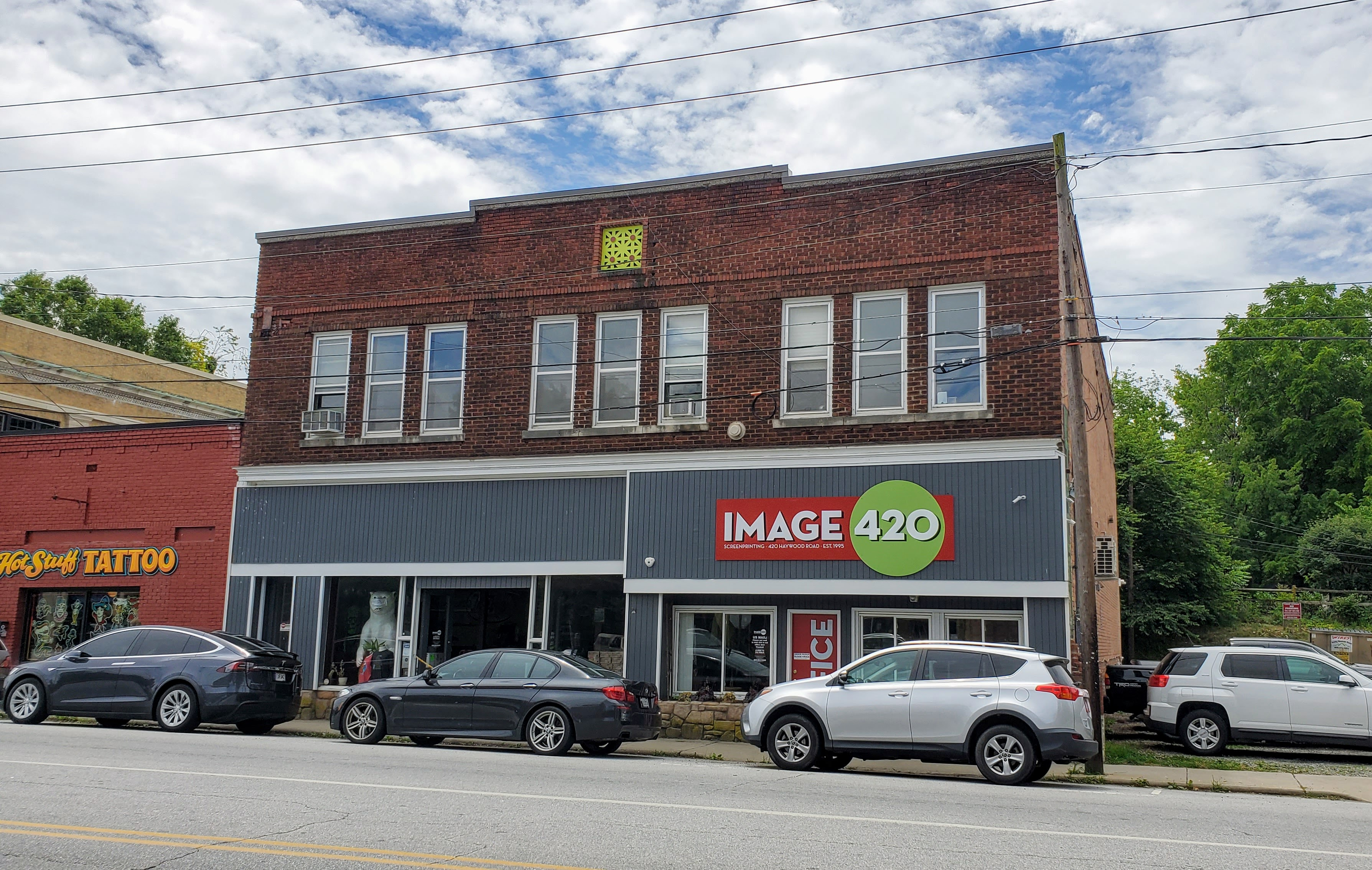
418-420 Haywood Road, 2021

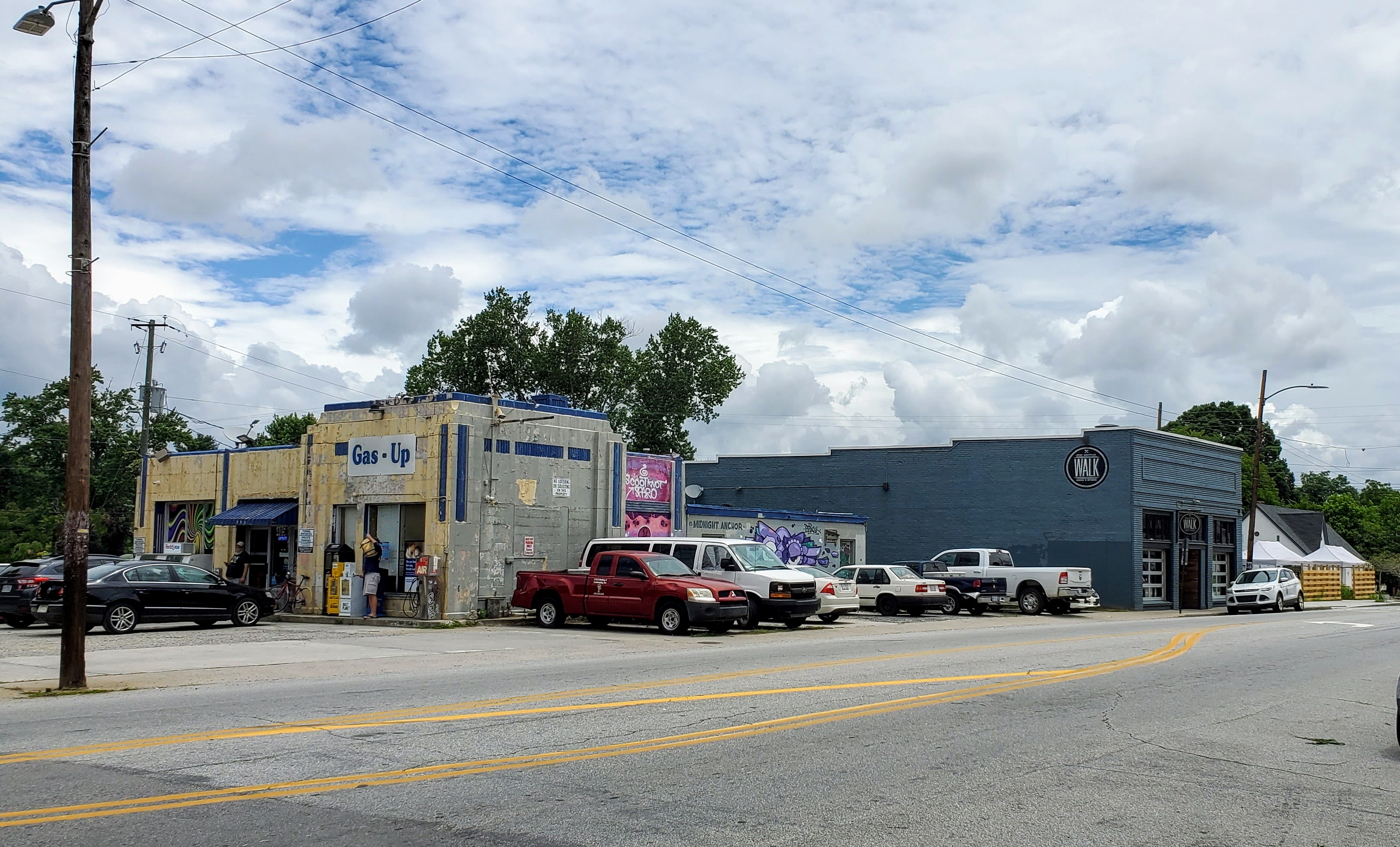
McGeachy Filling Station & West Asheville Motor Company, 2021
