= Ashville station =

- Ashville Depot
- U.S. National Register of Historic Places
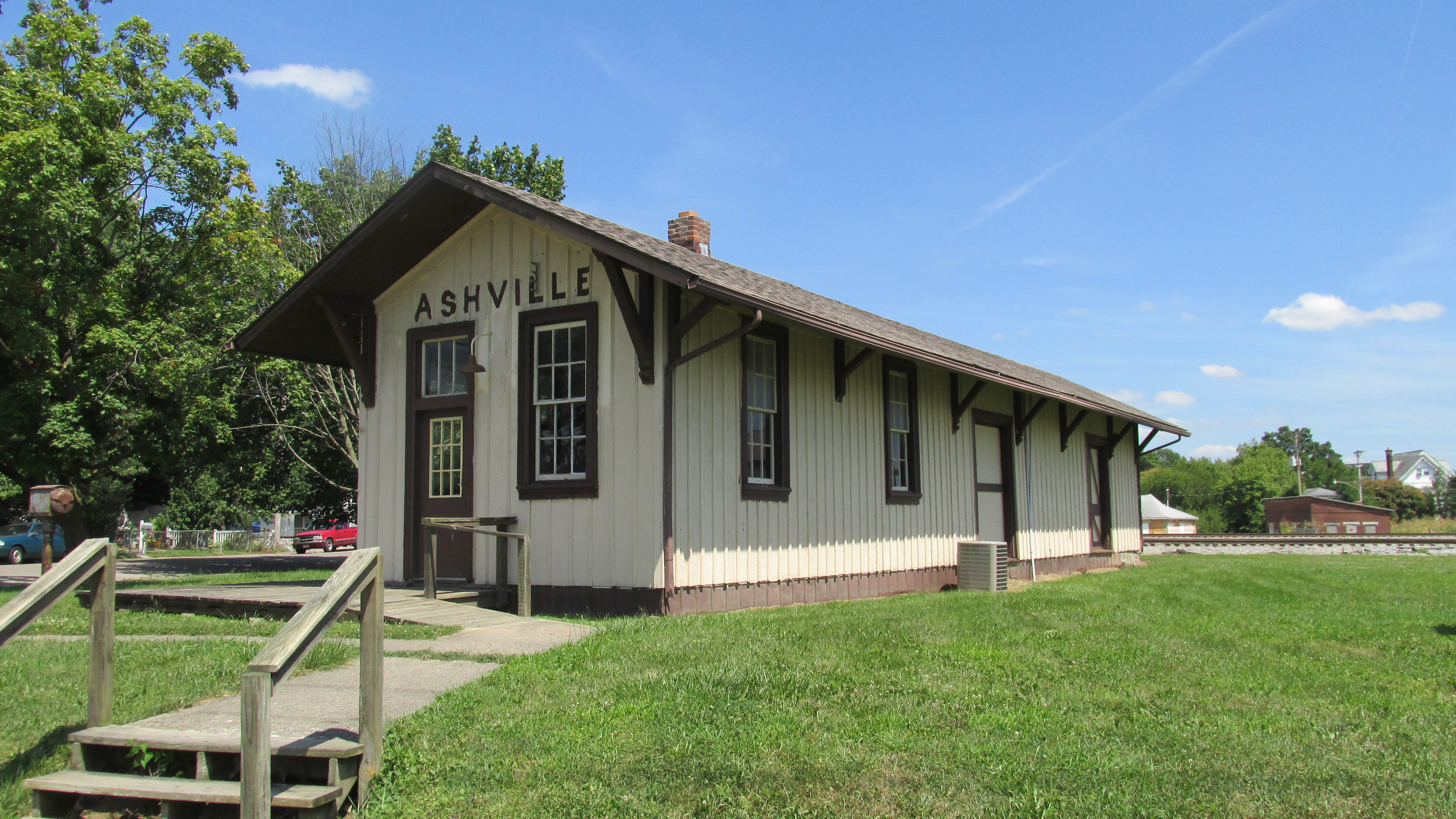
- Front and side

- Location within Ohio Location within the United States
- Location: Madison and Cromley Sts., Ashville, Ohio
- Coordinates: 39°42′54″N 82°57′20″W
- Area: Less than 1 acre (0.40 ha)
- Built: 1876
- NRHP reference No.: 80003209
- Added to NRHP: February 25, 1980

The Ashville Depot is a small former train station in the village of Ashville in Pickaway County, Ohio, United States. A simple weatherboaded building that was constructed in 1876, it was once the commercial center of the area.

Ashville was a railroad town that was founded at the intersection of a railroad line and a leading rural road. As the connecting point between the two modes of transportation, its train station was a central part of the life of the village and of the surrounding Harrison Township. In 1876, the short-lived Scioto Valley Railway erected a new station in Ashville; its construction helped to make the newly founded village the most important community in northern Pickaway County.

After a century of use, the depot was closed in 1976. Railroad officials planned its destruction, but local residents formed a historic preservation organization to save it; accordingly, it was relocated and placed on concrete blocks. The depot was added to the National Register of Historic Places in 1980, qualifying because of its historic architecture and its important place in local history; among the reasons it qualified was its status as the only extant train station built by the Scioto Valley Railway. Such a designation is unusual, for buildings that have been moved from their original locations are not normally eligible for inclusion on the National Register.

Preceding station	Norfolk and Western Railway	Following station
Circleville toward Portsmouth	Portsmouth – Columbus	Duvall toward Columbus
