= Watt–Groce–Fickhardt House =

Historic house in Ohio, United States

- U.S. National Register of Historic Places
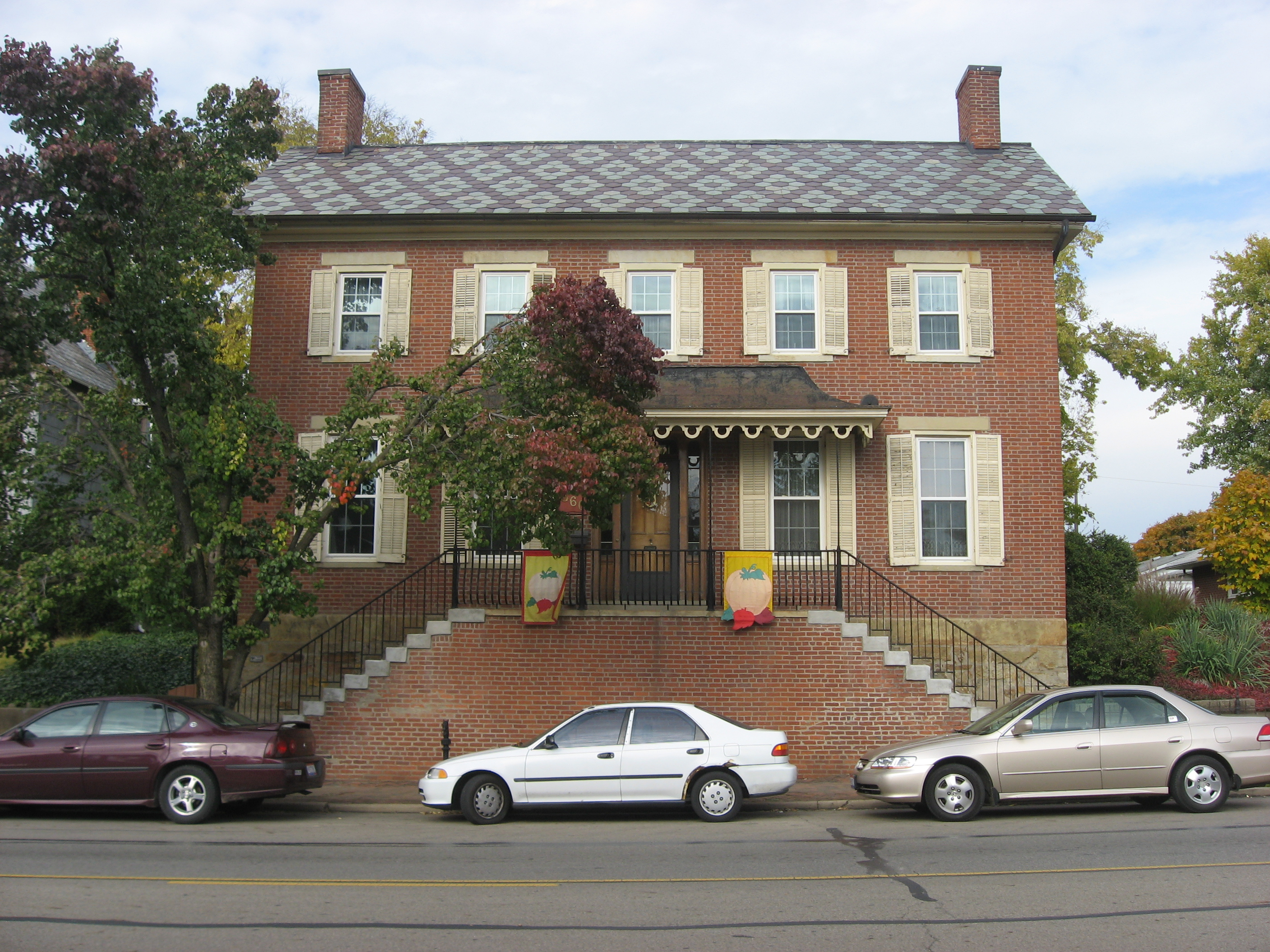
- Front of the house

- Location within Ohio Location within the United States
- Location: 360 E. Main St., Circleville, Ohio
- Coordinates: 39°36′0″N 82°56′20″W
- Area: 0.3 acres (0.12 ha)
- Built: 1826
- Architectural style: I-house
- NRHP reference No.: 85001804
- Added to NRHP: August 23, 1985

The Watt–Groce–Fickhardt House is a historic house in Circleville, Ohio, United States. Located along Main Street on the city's eastern side, it is a distinctive landmark and has been named a historic site.

Circleville was platted in 1810 on a farm owned by Jacob Ziegler and Samuel Watt; later in the year, Ziegler sold his interest in the farm to Watt. With the community's rapid expansion, Watt sold more land; by 1820, only 148 acres (60 ha) remained in his ownership. Using the money from the land sales, Watt built a new farmhouse in 1826; two stories high, it is a brick structure with a stone foundation and a metal roof. When completed, it was a typical hall and parlor house.

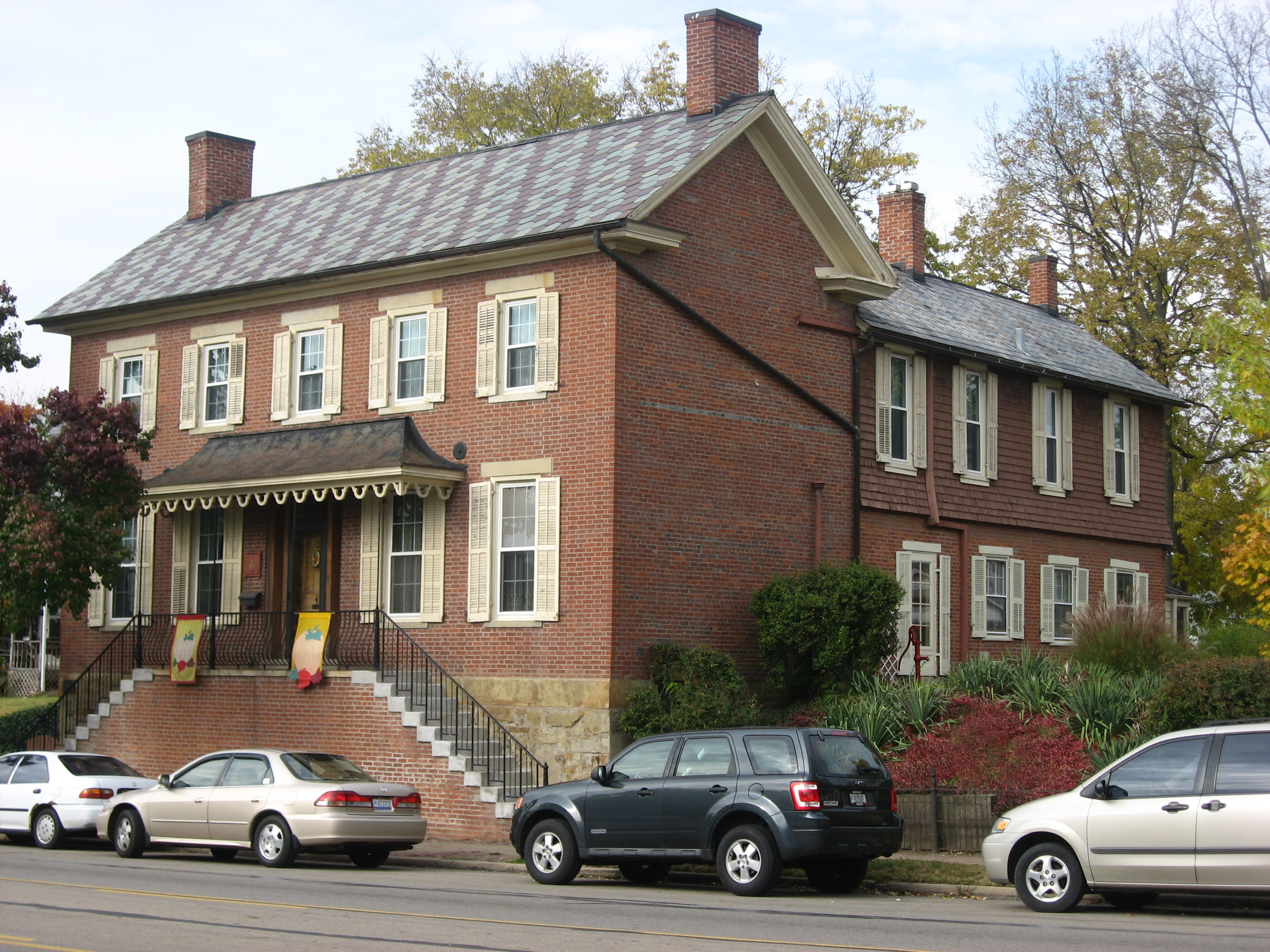
Front and side of the house

As Circleville continued to grow, Watt sold most of his remaining land in 1835; only 5 acres (2.0 ha) remained after the end of that year. Becoming a leading local businessman, he made an extensive addition to the house in 1852; this new structure took the form of an I-house. A smaller addition, built in 1885, is a frame structure attached to the original portion of the house.

Today, the Watt–Groce–Fickhardt House remains a well-preserved example of antebellum architecture. In 1985, the house was listed on the National Register of Historic Places, qualifying because of its historic architecture and because of its connection to a later resident, John G. Groce, who was a leading member of local society.
