= Teays Valley High School =

Public secondary school in Ashville, Ohio, United States

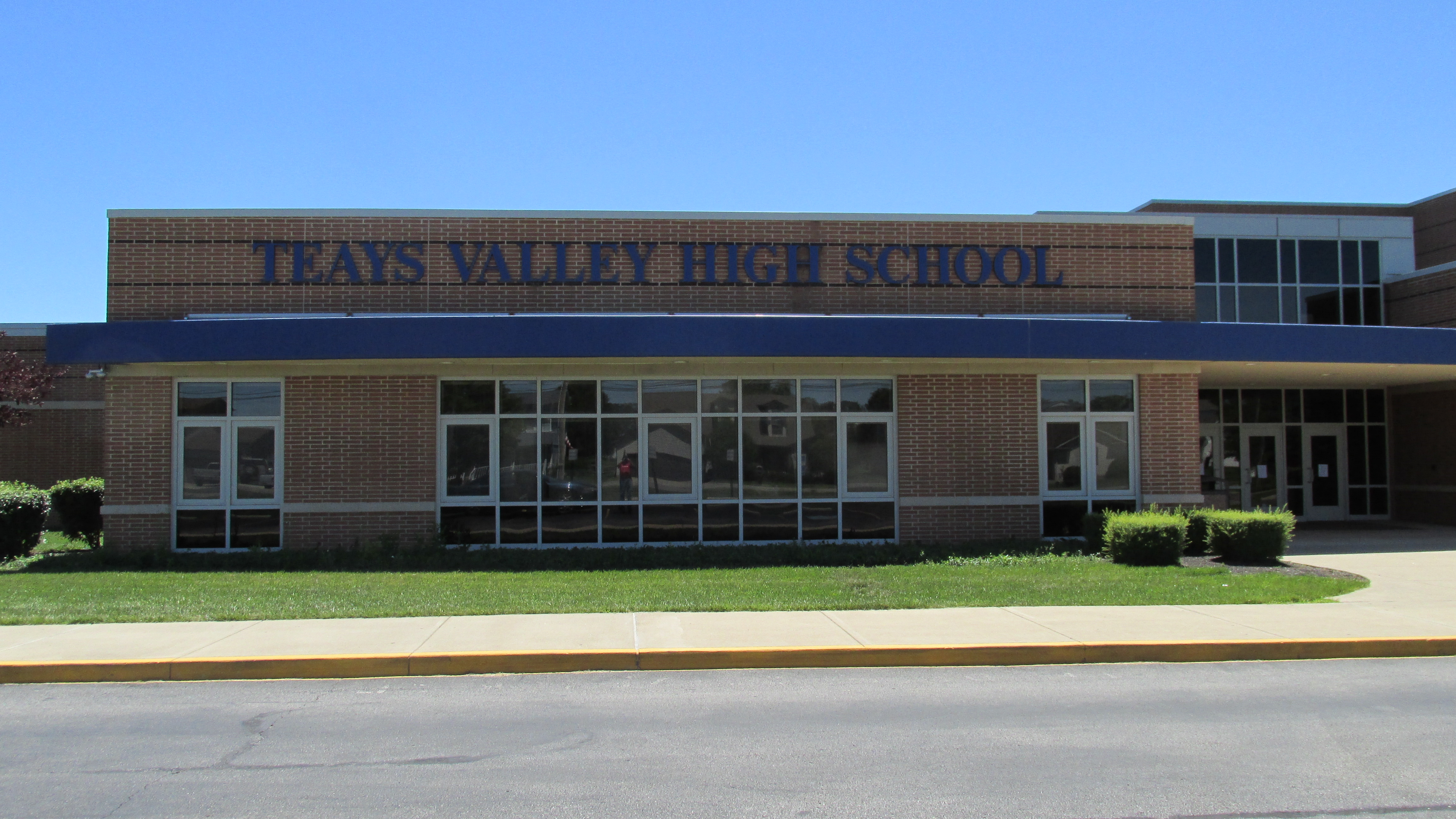
- Teays Valley High School

Location
- 3887 State Route 752; Ashville, OH; United States; 39°43′22″N 82°56′44″W

Information
- Type: Public High School
- School district: Teays Valley Local School District
- Teaching staff: 57.00 (FTE)
- Grades: 9-12
- Enrollment: 1,263 (2024-2025)
- Student to teacher ratio: 22.16
- Colors: Blue and Gold
- Song: Teays Valley Alma Mater
- Fight song: Teays Valley Fight Song
- Athletics conference: Ohio Capital Conference
- Team name: Vikings
- Feeder schools: Teays Valley East Middle School, Teays Valley West Middle School

Teays Valley High School is a public high school located at 3887 State Route 752 in Ashville, Ohio. It is the only high school in the Teays Valley Local School District. The school mascot is the Viking.

== Academics ==
As of the 2023–2024 school year, Teays Valley High School offers courses in English, mathematics, science (including physical science, biology, chemistry, physics, environmental science, and anatomy), and social studies (world history, U.S. history, government, and psychology). Additional subjects include information technology, Spanish, French, physical education, music (choir and band), and visual arts.

The school offers both Honors courses are available in English, mathematics, and science, with options including AP as well.

The school participates in Ohio's Post-Secondary Enrollment Option (PSEO), which allows students to take courses at participating colleges and universities. Ohio Christian University and Columbus State Community College are common choices.

Graduates pursue various post-secondary options, including military service and college. Approximately 90% of college-bound students attend institutions within Ohio.

== Athletics ==
As of the 2023–2024 school year, Teays Valley has 23 varsity-level teams. All athletic teams participate in the Mid-State League.

=== Fall Sports ===
- Cheerleading
- Cross country (Boys)
- Cross country (Girls)
- Football
- Golf (Boys) l
- Golf (Girls)
- Soccer (Boys)
- Soccer (Girls)
- Tennis (Girls)
- Volleyball (Girls)

=== Winter Sports ===
- Basketball (Boys)
- Basketball (Girls)
- Bowling (Boys)
- Bowling (Girls)
- Swimming
- Wrestling - Two state champions

=== Spring Sports ===
- Baseball
- Softball
  - OHSAA Division I State Champions: 2015
- Tennis (Boys)
- Track and field - Two state champions

=== Ohio High School Athletic Association State Championships ===
==== Team championships ====
- Girls Softball - 2015

== Career and technical ==
Many students opt at the end of their sophomore year to attend the Eastland-Fairfield Career & Technical Schools. These allow students to focus on one area or even a specific career path. These students are for all purposes attending the career center, but are eligible to participate in any extracurricular activities that Teays Valley offers, as well. Eastland-Fairfield Career and Technical Schools which offers nearly 40 high school programs designed for students in their junior and senior year.

| School | Location | Satellite Locations | School Districts | Grades |
|---|---|---|---|---|
| Eastland-Fairfield Career & Technical Schools | Eastland: Groveport, Ohio Fairfield: Carrol, Ohio | Lincoln High School; Groveport Madison High School; New Albany High School; Pickerington High School North; Reynoldsburg High School; Canal Winchester High School | 16 School Districts | 11–12 |

== Notable alumni ==
- Sarah Fisher, former IndyCar Series driver and owner of Sarah Fisher Hartman Racing
- Champ Henson, former Ohio State and NFL player; current Pickaway County commissioner
