= Oscar Randolph =

American football player and coach (1884–1964)

Biographical details
- Born: September 28, 1884; Chicago, Illinois, U.S.
- Died: December 31, 1964 (aged 80)

Playing career
- 1903–1906: Virginia
- Position: Quarterback

Coaching career (HC unless noted)
- 1907–1910: Virginia (assistant)
- 1912–1917: VMI (assistant)
- 1919: Virginia (assistant)

Accomplishments and honors

Awards
- All-Southern (1906)

Reverend Oscar W. Randolph
- Church: The Episcopal Church
- Diocese: Southern Virginia

Personal details
- Born: September 28, 1884 Chicago, Illinois
- Died: December 31, 1964 (aged 80)
- Denomination: Anglican
- Parents: Isham Randolph
- Education: University of Virginia

Oscar De Wolf Randolph (September 28, 1884 – December 31, 1964) was an American football player and coach and Episcopal minister. Both Randolph Hall at Virginia Episcopal School in Lynchburg, VA and Randolph Memorial Hall at St. Mary's-on-the-Highlands Episcopal Church in Birmingham, AL are named in his honor. One description of his personality was that of a "cold fish". He was the son of Isham Randolph, and a descendant of Sir John Randolph.

Randolph played quarterback for the Virginia Cavaliers of the University of Virginia. He was a protege of then Virginia quarterback John Pollard, and "one of the fastest quarters Virginia has ever had." In 1906, Randolph was selected for the All-Southern team published in The Washington Post. He was a teammate of Billy Gloth.

After UVA, Randolph entered the Virginia Theological Seminary and helped coach the Episcopal High School football team. He helped coach the backfields of Virginia and VMI in later years.

He was the rector of Robert E. Lee Memorial Episcopal Church in Lexington, and conducted the funeral of Lee's son.

On March 3, 1919, Randolph became the interim rector of St. Mary's-on-the-Highlands Episcopal Church in Birmingham, Alabama, leading the church through the Lenten season. After Easter, Randolph was issued and accepted a formal call to be the church's fifth rector. During Randolph's tenure, a new Parish House was constructed—and despite relocation and reconstruction, the Parish Hall of St. Mary's is still named Randolph Memorial Hall in his honor. Randolph resigned from St. Mary's on December 30, 1928 to become Rector and President of Virginia Episcopal School in Lynchburg, VA.
