= Little Chicago, Ohio =

Unincorporated community in Ohio, U.S.

Coordinates: 39°43′20″N 82°57′10″W

Little Chicago is an unincorporated community in Pickaway County, in the U.S. state of Ohio. The community has been incorporated into the Village of Ashville, Ohio.

== History ==
The community was established as a railroad town. It was the area that surrounded the tracks of the then Scioto Valley Railway which has since become owned by Norfolk Southern Railway.
