= Commercial Point, Ohio =

- Village
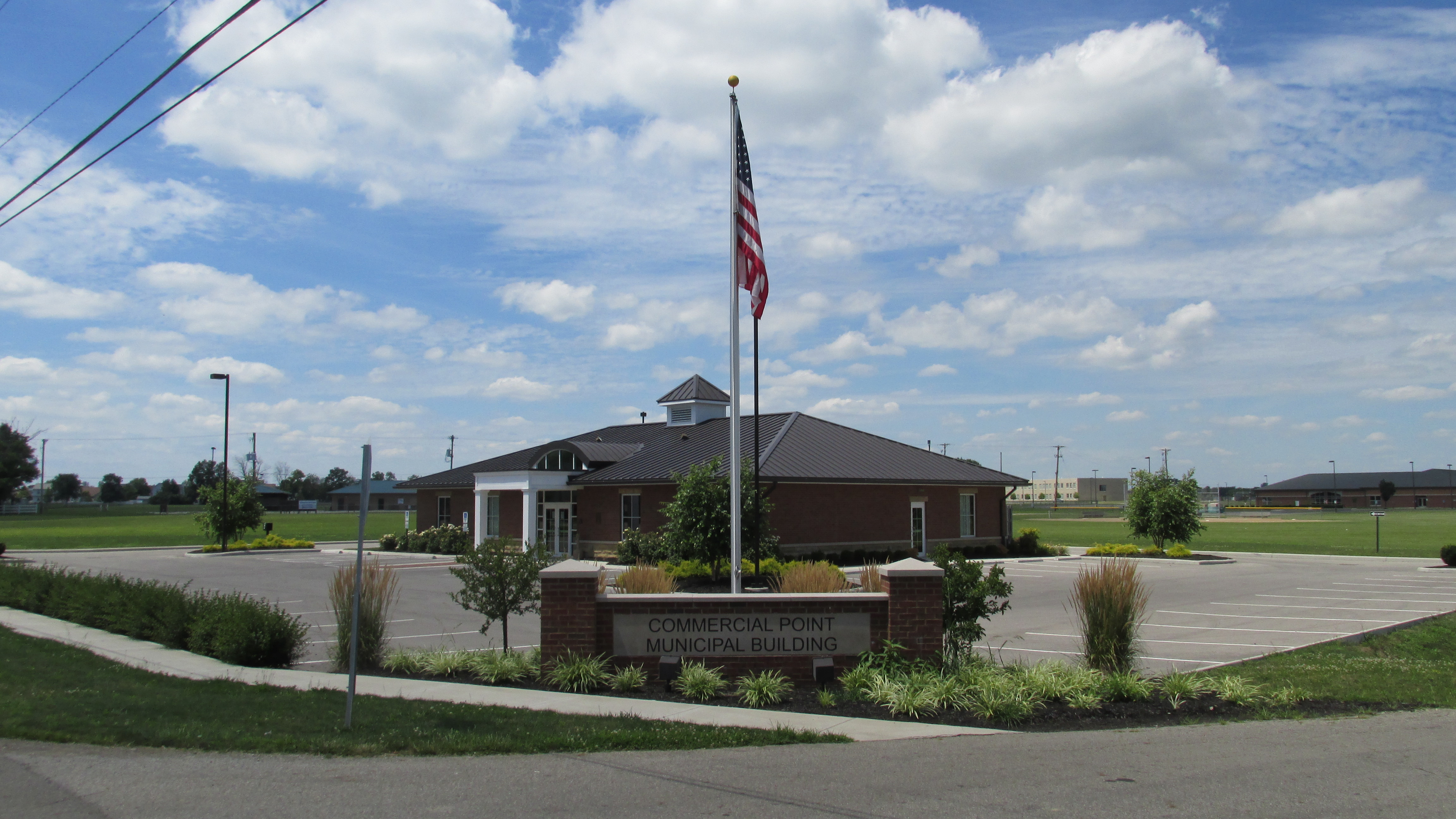
- Commercial Point municipal building

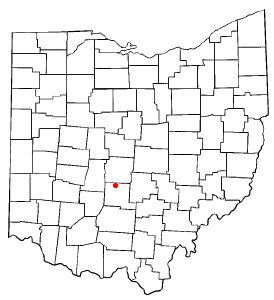
- Location of Commercial Point, Ohio

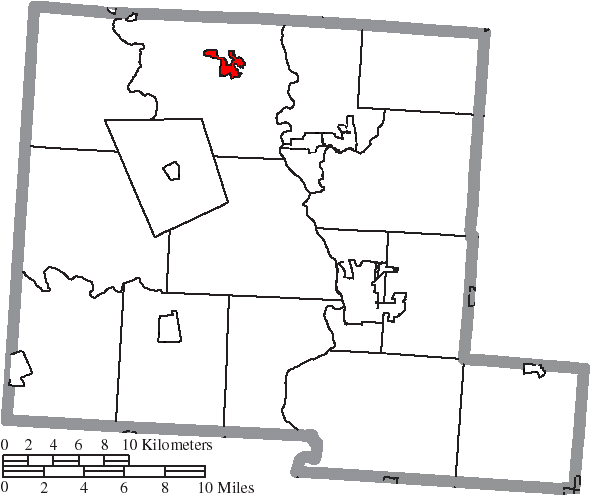
- Location of Commercial Point in Pickaway County
- Coordinates: 39°47′12″N 83°01′32″W
- Country: United States
- State: Ohio
- County: Pickaway
- Township: Scioto

Government
  - Mayor: Nancy Geiger

Area
  - Total: 3.75 sq mi (9.70 km^{2})
  - Land: 3.74 sq mi (9.68 km^{2})
  - Water: 0.0077 sq mi (0.02 km^{2})
- Elevation: 705 ft (215 m)

Population (2020)
  - Total: 3,078
  - Estimate (2023): 3,215
  - Density: 823.1/sq mi (317.81/km^{2})
- Time zone: UTC-5 (Eastern (EST))
  - Summer (DST): UTC-4 (EDT)
- ZIP code: 43116
- Area code: 614
- FIPS code: 39-18070
- GNIS feature ID: 2398608
- Website: https://www.commercialpointohio.gov/

Commercial Point is a village in Pickaway County, Ohio, United States. The population was 3,078 at the 2020 census. It is one of the fastest-growing villages in central Ohio.

== History ==
Wiley H. Beckett came from eastern Virginia in 1829 and settled on a 238-acre tract west of the present Commercial Point. In 1841 he laid out a community called Genoa. James H. Burnley, also from Virginia, arrived in the area in 1832 and laid out a similar community east of Genoa called Rome. As the two towns grew larger, Rome became the western half, and Genoa the eastern half, of a new single town. When Genoa was incorporated in 1851, Rome was merged into the new village. The first store was established in 1844 by Wiley H. Beckett, and the post office was originally named Beckett's Store. The name of the village was changed in 1872 to Commercial Point.

== Geography ==
According to the United States Census Bureau, the village has a total area of 1.13 square miles (2.93 km^{2}), all of it land.

== Demographics ==
Historical population
Census	Pop.	Note	%±
1870	154		—
1880	169		9.7%
1890	265		56.8%
1900	245		−7.5%
1910	234		−4.5%
1920	220		−6.0%
1930	211		−4.1%
1940	207		−1.9%
1950	238		15.0%
1960	308		29.4%
1970	320		3.9%
1980	316		−1.2%
1990	405		28.2%
2000	776		91.6%
2010	1,582		103.9%
2020	3,078		94.6%
2023 (est.)	3,215	▲	4.5%
U.S. Decennial Census

=== 2020 census ===
As of the 2020 census, Commercial Point had a population of 3,078. The median age was 32.5 years. 35.5% of residents were under the age of 18 and 8.2% of residents were 65 years of age or older. For every 100 females there were 93.8 males, and for every 100 females age 18 and over there were 95.0 males age 18 and over.

0.0% of residents lived in urban areas, while 100.0% lived in rural areas.

There were 926 households in Commercial Point, of which 57.7% had children under the age of 18 living in them. Of all households, 70.2% were married-couple households, 10.0% were households with a male householder and no spouse or partner present, and 13.1% were households with a female householder and no spouse or partner present. About 10.8% of all households were made up of individuals and 4.6% had someone living alone who was 65 years of age or older.

There were 963 housing units, of which 3.8% were vacant. The homeowner vacancy rate was 0.4% and the rental vacancy rate was 2.1%.

Racial composition as of the 2020 census
Race	Number	Percent
White	2,693	87.5%
Black or African American	85	2.8%
American Indian and Alaska Native	6	0.2%
Asian	45	1.5%
Native Hawaiian and Other Pacific Islander	1	0.0%
Some other race	41	1.3%
Two or more races	207	6.7%
Hispanic or Latino (of any race)	84	2.7%

=== Income and poverty ===
The median household income in the village was $102,689, and the median income for a family was $107,000. Median income for married-couples families was $115,679, making it the highest median income community in Pickaway county. Males had a median income of $71,691 versus $64,595 for females. The per capita income for the village was $43,964. About 5.6% of the population were below the poverty line. Home ownership rate in the village was 93.8%.

=== 2010 census ===
As of the census of 2010, there were 1,582 people, 507 households, and 413 families residing in the village. The population density was 1,400.0 inhabitants per square mile (540.5/km^{2}). There were 547 housing units at an average density of 484.1 per square mile (186.9/km^{2}). The racial makeup of the village was 94.4% White, 1.3% African American, 0.3% Native American, 1.3% Asian, 1.0% from other races, and 1.8% from two or more races. Hispanic or Latino people of any race were 2.0% of the population.

There were 507 households, of which 53.1% had children under the age of 18 living with them, 67.5% were married couples living together, 9.7% had a female householder with no husband present, 4.3% had a male householder with no wife present, and 18.5% were non-families. 14.0% of all households were made up of individuals, and 4.2% had someone living alone who was 65 years of age or older. The average household size was 3.12 and the average family size was 3.43.

The median age in the village was 32.1 years. 34.8% of residents were under the age of 18; 6.1% were between the ages of 18 and 24; 32.7% were from 25 to 44; 19.9% were from 45 to 64; and 6.4% were 65 years of age or older. The gender makeup of the village was 48.0% male and 52.0% female.

=== 2000 census ===
As of the census of 2000, there were 776 people, 277 households, and 222 families residing in the village. The population density was 712.5 inhabitants per square mile (275.1/km^{2}). There were 288 housing units at an average density of 264.4 per square mile (102.1/km^{2}). The racial makeup of the village was 98.07% White, 0.13% African American, 0.13% Asian, and 1.68% from two or more races. Hispanic or Latino people of any race were 0.52% of the population.

There were 277 households, out of which 44.0% had children under the age of 18 living with them, 66.8% were married couples living together, 9.4% had a female householder with no husband present, and 19.5% were non-families. 14.8% of all households were made up of individuals, and 6.5% had someone living alone who was 65 years of age or older. The average household size was 2.80 and the average family size was 3.13.

In the village, the population was spread out, with 30.5% under the age of 18, 6.8% from 18 to 24, 35.3% from 25 to 44, 19.7% from 45 to 64, and 7.6% who were 65 years of age or older. The median age was 34 years. For every 100 females there were 95.5 males. For every 100 females age 18 and over, there were 93.9 males.

The median income for a household in the village was $55,563, and the median income for a family was $56,806. Males had a median income of $33,571 versus $26,625 for females. The per capita income for the village was $21,964. About 6.7% of families and 9.0% of the population were below the poverty line, including 16.2% of those under age 18 and 29.8% of those age 65 or over.

== Education ==
Commercial Point is served by the Teays Valley Local School District. Schools located here include the highly rated Scioto Elementary School and Teays Valley West Middle School.

== Notable residents ==
- Sarah Fisher, former IndyCar Series driver and team owner
- Corinne Morgan, singer and recording artist

== Gallery ==
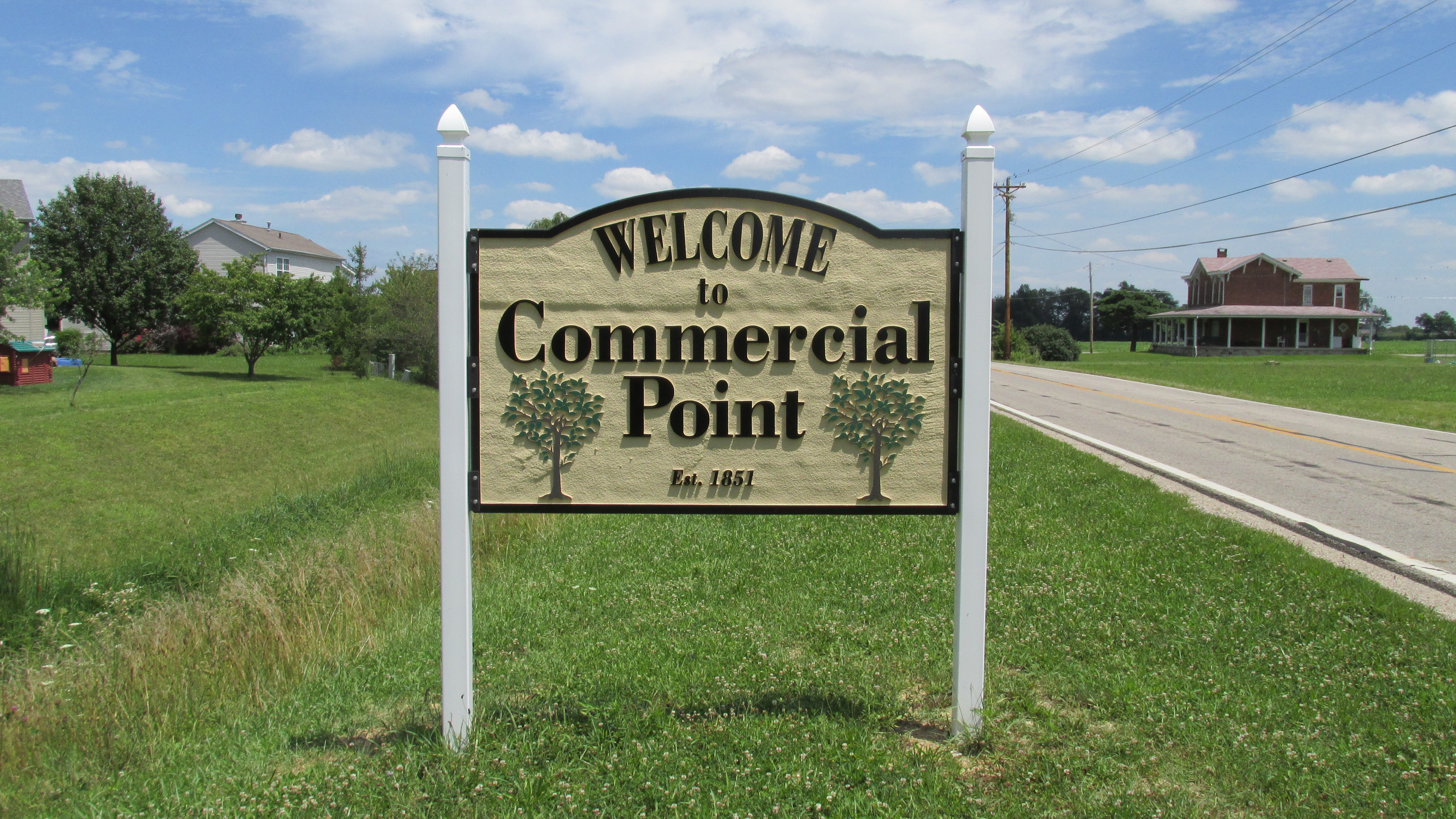
Commercial Point community sign

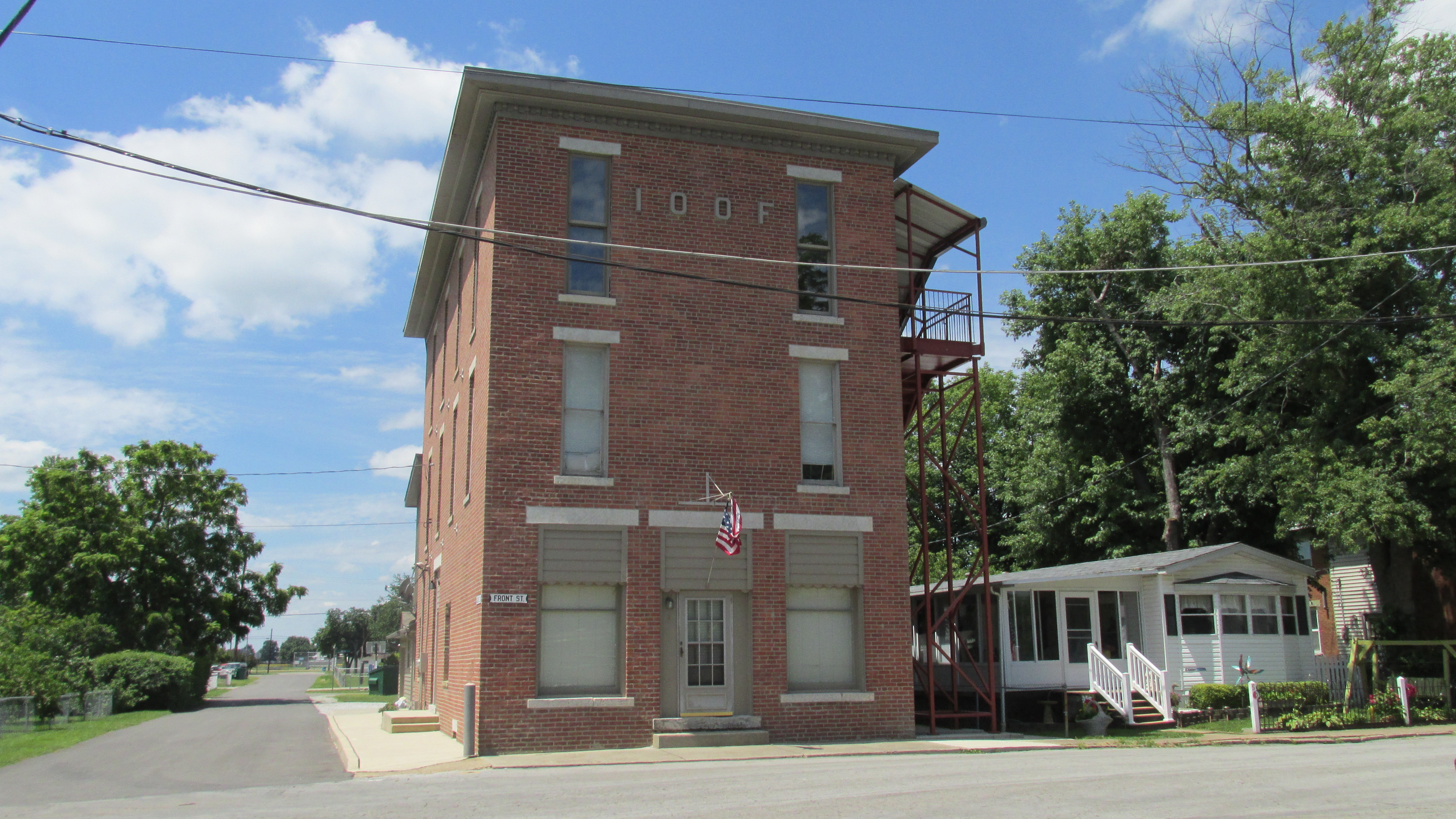
Independent Order of Odd Fellows building

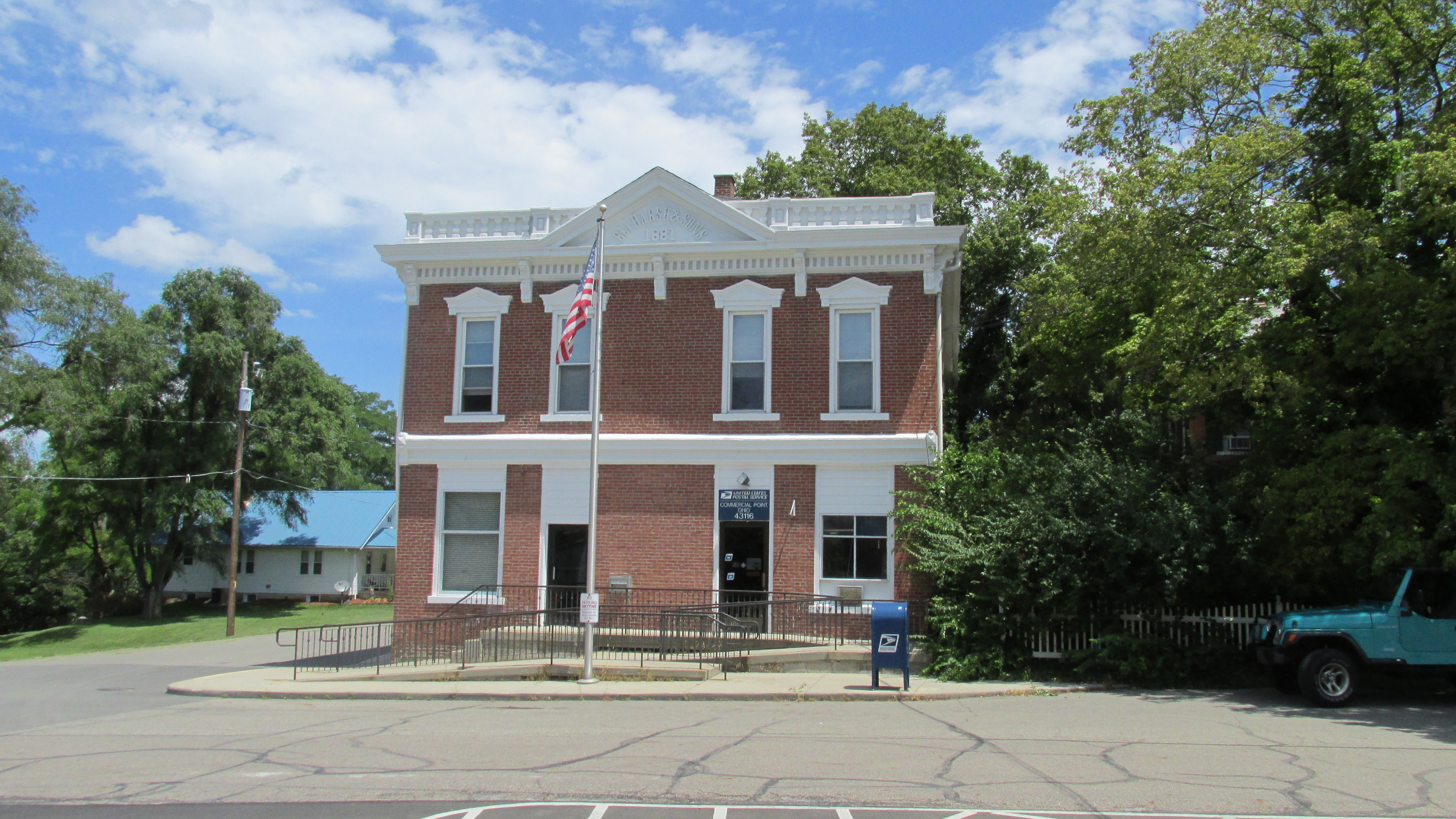
Former Commercial Point post office

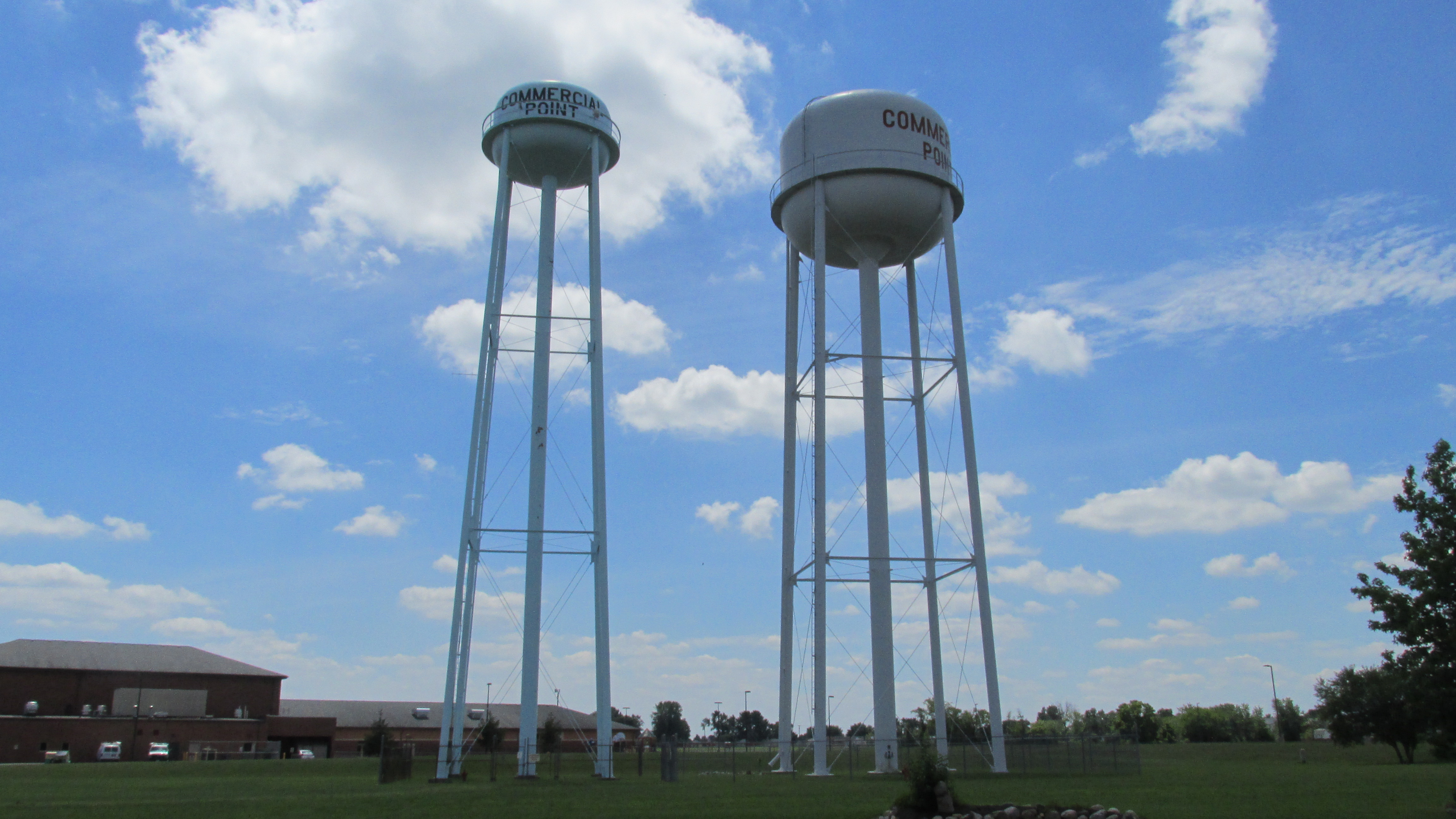
Water towers in Commercial Point
