= Diana Blaney =

American planetary scientist

Diana Lee Blaney is an American planetary scientist at the Jet Propulsion Laboratory, and a former chair of the Division for Planetary Sciences of the American Astronomical Society.

== Research ==
Blaney's research focuses on instrumentation for space missions to determine the chemical composition of bodies in the Solar System, including "directing the infrared instrument" on the Spirit rover on Mars, and serving as principal investigator for the Mapping Imaging Spectrometer for Europa, a planned mission to study the surface and internal water ocean of Europa.

== Education and career ==
Blaney is originally from Ashville, Ohio, the daughter of two teachers, and grew up dreaming of becoming a scientist of some sort before settling on space science. She majored in mechanical engineering at the Ohio State University, graduating in 1984. She completed a PhD in geology and geophysics at the University of Hawaiʻi at Mānoa in 1990; her doctoral research involved Earth-based observation of Mars, supervised by Thomas B. McCord.

She came to JPL for postdoctoral research as a National Research Council Research Associate in 1990. Initially, she intended to work on a spectrometer for the Mars Observer, but after that instrument was cancelled she quickly switched to other projects involving unmanned landers on Mars and comets, eventually including the Chemistry and Camera complex of the Mars rover missions. She has remained at JPL as a scientist since 1992, and is Deputy Project Scientist for the Mars Exploration Rover project.

She chaired the Division for Planetary Sciences of the American Astronomical Society for the 2021–2022 term.
