= Isham Randolph =

American civil engineer

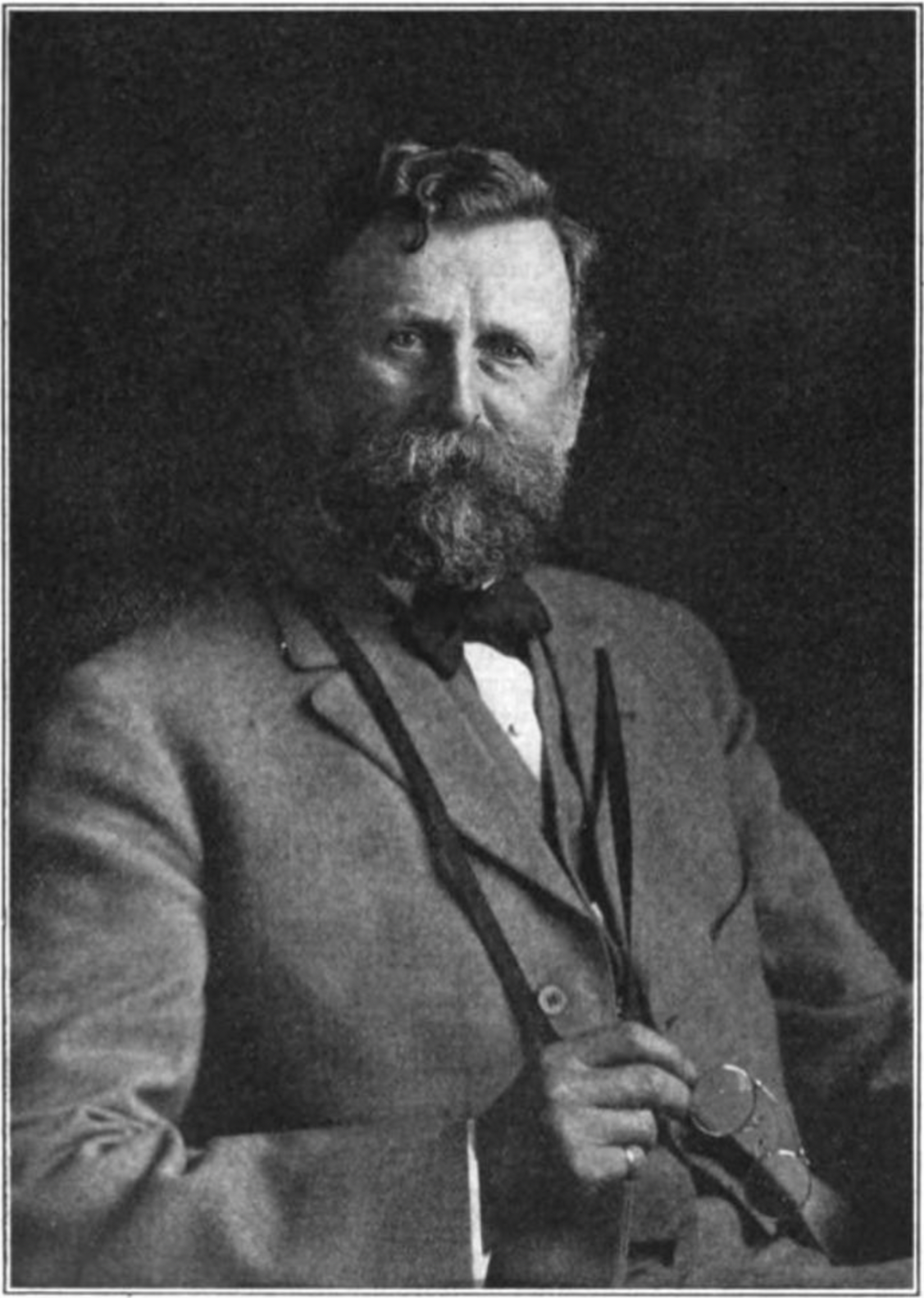
- Born: March 25, 1848; Clarke County, Virginia
- Died: August 2, 1920 (aged 72); Chicago, Illinois
- Engineering career
- Discipline: Civil engineering
- Projects: Chicago Sanitary and Ship Canal
- Awards: Elliott Cresson Medal (1913)

Signature
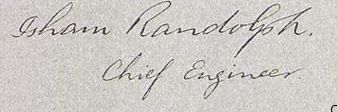

Isham Randolph (March 25, 1848 in Clarke County, Virginia – August 5, 1920) was an American civil engineer who is best known as the chief engineer of the Sanitary District of Chicago during the construction of the Chicago Sanitary and Ship Canal. Randolph had no formal engineering training, he began his career as a railroad axeman. After completing the Chicago Sanitary and Ship Canal, at the time the largest canal in the world, Randolph became a consulting engineer on the Panama Canal at the request of the Roosevelt Administration.

== Early life in Virginia (1848–1870) ==
Isham Randolph is a descendant of the prominent Randolph family of Virginia. He was 13 years old when the American Civil War began, and lost two brothers who fought for the Confederate States of America. Randolph's family owned slaves, and Randolph learned the beginnings of his engineering skills from a slave his family owned. In 1868, Randolph became an axeman working on the Winchester and Strasburg Railroad, part of the Winchester and Potomac Railroad operated at the time by the Baltimore and Ohio Railroad. Following his service with the Baltimore and Ohio Railroad, he was the Assistant Engineer for the Scioto Valley Railroad. Randolph Street in Ashville, Ohio is named in his honor.

== Railroad work in Chicago (1870–1893) ==
Randolph arrived in Chicago in 1870, working as a surveyor for the Chicago Division of the Baltimore and Ohio Railroad. In 1880 Randolph became the chief engineer of the Chicago and Western Indiana Railroad. In 1880, Randolph presented himself to Carter Harrison, Sr. the Mayor of Chicago, and his 3rd cousin. The mayor opposed the expansion of the line Randolph was working on, and encouraged mob action against Randolph and his men.

== Chief Engineer, Sanitary District of Chicago (1893–1907) ==
Randolph was appointed the Chief Engineer of the Sanitary District of Chicago on June 7, 1893, and left that position in 1907. His most significant contribution to the district was the Chicago Sanitary and Ship Canal which reversed the flow of the Chicago River and created a large vessel waterway between Lake Michigan and the Gulf of Mexico. Randolph was the fourth Chief Engineer of the district, the previous three were not able to conceive of a plan for the canal that would meet the requirements of the city for a budget that the city was satisfied with. The last statement is not correct, although it may be attributed to the cited reference. The basic plan for the canal was in the 1887 report of the Commission on Drainage and Water Supply appointed by the Chicago City Council. The report was prepared by Rudolph Hering assisted by Benezette Williams and Samuel Artingstall. Williams and Artingstall were the second and third chief engineers of the Sanitary District of Chicago, preceding Randolph. The initial contracts for construction of the canal were awarded and construction began before Randolph was appointed. Randolph's genius in the construction of the canal and later projects of the district was his strict adherence to the plan and contract requirements. He deftly guided the elected board members of the district in making sound engineering decisions. He also supervised others in the design of regulating structures, controlling gates and a navigation lock that were pioneering for the time.

== The Panama Canal & private practice (1905–1920) ==
Randolph was appointed to the International Board of Consulting Engineers for the construction of the Panama Canal in May 1905 by President Theodore Roosevelt. After resigning from the Sanitary District of Chicago in 1907, Randolph went into private practice as a civil engineer. Isham Randolph died August 2, 1920.
