= Teays Valley Local School District =

School district in Ohio, United States

Address
- 385 Viking Way Ashville, Ohio, 43103; United States

District information
- Type: Public
- Motto: All In
- Grades: Pre-K–12
- Established: 1963; 63 years ago
- Superintendent: Kyle Wolfe
- Asst. superintendent(s): Shannon Helser
- Schools: 7
- Budget: $55.7 million (FY 2024)
- NCES District ID: 3904909

Students and staff
- Enrollment: 4,538 (2024–2025)
- Teachers: 209.10 (on an FTE basis) (2024–2025)
- Staff: 323.50 (on an FTE basis) (2024–2025)
- Student–teacher ratio: 21.70 (2024–2025)
- Athletic conference: Ohio Capital Conference

Other information
- Website: www.tvsd.us

Teays Valley Local School District is a school district in Pickaway County, Ohio, United States. It services the communities of South Bloomfield, Ashville, Commercial Point, and Amanda; in addition, students from Circleville and Grove City attend.

== History ==
Teays Valley was officially established in 1963 when Ashville-Harrison, Walnut Township, and Scioto Township High Schools combined. At that time, the student population was just 1,650. They named the school "Teays Valley" after the ancient Teays River that ran under present day Pickaway County. The school district is the largest in Pickaway County.

The district is featured in the Together Concepts video production "We Are Teays Valley". The video depicts a surprising number of achievements and innovations, as well as connections to American and world history.

In 2007, the Teays Valley Educational Foundation, a 501(c)(3) organization was founded to promote excellence within the district.

== Schools ==
=== High schools ===
Teays Valley High School, located in Ashville, Ohio, draws students over the northern half of Pickaway County, Ohio. It was opened in 1964 and is currently the largest high school in the county.

=== Middle schools ===
The students living in the eastern part of the school district go to Teays Valley East Middle School, while the ones living on the western side of the district go to Teays Valley West Middle School.

==== Teays Valley East Middle School ====
Opened in 2009, East Middle School is located in Ashville, Ohio, and hosts sixth through eighth grade students. Currently, there are 485 students enrolled at the school. Each grade is separated into two blocks, gold and blue. Each block is then assigned teaching staff for the core courses which consist of science, mathematics, social studies, and language arts. Other required courses (physical education, health education, college & career connections and arts education), and electives (vocal music, instrumental music).

Nine sports are offered to students in both seventh and eighth-grade. They are football, cross country, golf, volleyball, basketball, wrestling, baseball, softball, and track and field. Non-competitive cheerleading is also offered. Like the high school, all teams compete in the Ohio Capital Conference.

==== Teays Valley West Middle School ====
The school is located on 74.94 acres in the Village of Commercial Point, Ohio. The property was obtained in 2008 and is located next to Scioto Elementary.

Currently, there are 502 students in grades sixth through eighth enrolled at the school. Each grade is separated into two blocks, gold and blue. Each block is then assigned teaching staff for the core courses which consist of science, mathematics, social studies, and language arts. Other required courses (physical education, health education, college & career connections and arts education), and electives (vocal music, instrumental music).

Nine sports are offered to students in both seventh and eighth grade. They are football, cross country, golf, volleyball, basketball, wrestling, baseball, softball, and track and field. Non-competitive cheerleading is also offered. Unlike the high school and East Middle School, all teams compete in the Mid-state League Ohio Division.

=== Elementary schools ===
All of the district's elementary schools contain grades Pre-k through 5th grade.

==== Ashville Elementary ====
Ashville Elementary is a PK–5th grade school located in Ashville, Ohio. The school has 502 students as of February 2020. Originally a high school, the original building which was built in 1928, was transitioned to an elementary when Ashville–Harrison School joined the district in 1963. In 2003, a new building was erected and the old building torn down. The mascot for the original school was the Broncos with black and orange as the colors.

==== Scioto Elementary ====
Scioto Elementary is the largest elementary school in the district with 677 students in grades PK–5. It is located in Commercial Point, Ohio next to West Middle School. The original school for Scioto Township was built in 1917 and was demolished in 2003, with the new school built several hundred yards north of the original building. The elementary was one of the three schools that originally made up the district in 1963. Scioto had been known as the Buffaloes with red and black as the school's colors.

==== South Bloomfield Elementary ====
South Bloomfield is the newest of the elementary schools, it is also the smallest with 422 students as of February 2020. The school opened in 2013 and has grades PK–5.

==== Walnut Elementary ====
Walnut Elementary is a K–5th grade school located near the former village of Nebraska, Ohio and in Walnut Township. The school is the only building in the district that is not in the incorporation limits of a city or village. Walnut Township School was built in 1922 and were known as the Tigers with the colors of black and red. The building was torn down in 2003 when a new school was erected next to it. Currently, 513 students attend Walnut and eventually go to East Middle School.

=== Former schools ===
==== Teays Valley Middle School ====
Opened in 1985, all sixth through eighth grade students attended this central campus. In 2002, the school expanded adding a new cafeteria, music rooms and several classrooms. Due to rapid growth in Scioto Township, the district decided to build two new middle schools and split the students based on the location of their residence. The new schools opened in 2009 and the former middle school became the Freshman Campus, District offices and home to Brooks-Yates.

== Current Events ==
With each issue, the Circleville Herald dedicates a page to happenings in the Teays Valley Local School District, including a "Superintendent's Corner" editorial written by the current superintendent of the district.
