= Glass production in Licking County, Ohio =

Licking County has been tied to the glass-making industry throughout the Midwest since the 1800s. This is due to the silica deposits found throughout rivers in Ohio. Although glass production has decreased in Licking County since the 1800s, it is still relevant today.

== History ==
Shields King & Co. was a glass manufacturing company founded in 1871, and it began making glass bottles. It was founded by William Shields, David E. Stevens, Oren G. King, William E. Atkinson, and David C. Winegarner. They worked with others like Richard Lumley to complete different patents including self-sealing fruit jars. Together, King & Co. worked in the Newark Star Glassworks factory to produce beer bottles, jars, and bottle stoppers.

After opening in 1871, they were successful however; after being bought by Edward H. Everett in 1880, it prompted a significant increase in business. During the late 1800s, 20,000 dollars' worth of beer bottles were produced for a brewing company in Cincinnati. The factory was in production until it burnt down in May 1893, only to begin production again in December. Edward H. Everett decided to facilitate a combination with other glass companies and create The American Bottle Company, a glass container manufacturer in the Midwest. It was founded in 1905 and is known for producing various bottles and jars for multiple industries.

Edward H. Everett caused growth within the glass industry as these factories became entirely based on machines for production. Machine-based production benefited the speed at which glassware was produced. However, the machines removed the heritage of glass blowers, taking away jobs from previous employees.

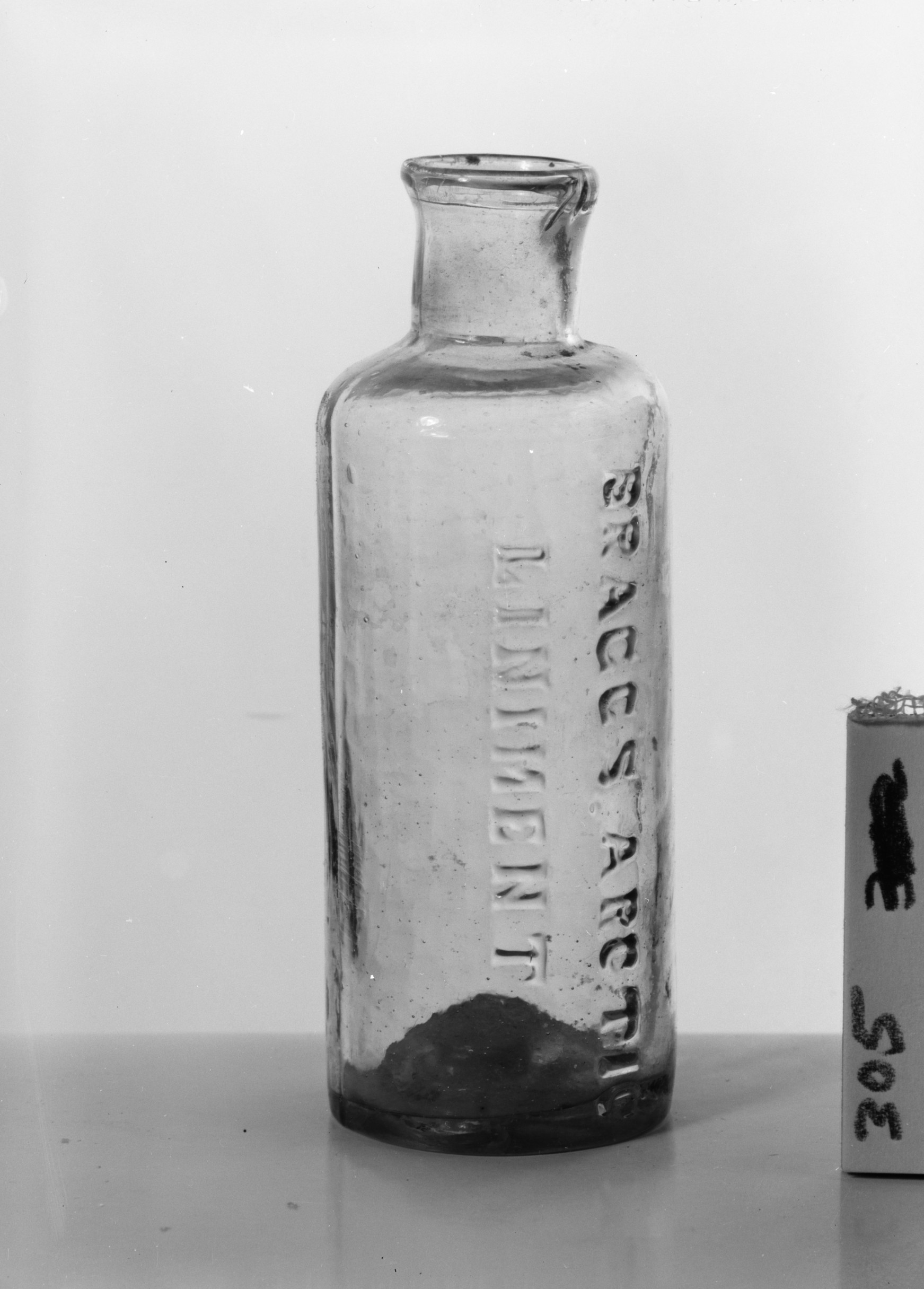
In the 1800s in Licking County this is what a glass bottle would have looked like.

The “Stevens Tin Top” is an example of a piece of glass produced in the Newark Star Glassworks. It had a groove-ring wax sealer in a blue aquamarine glass. The jar is hand blown and has a tool applied to the lip. There were two patented fruit jars in 1875, and the name of their jars came to be called The Western Pride Self Sealing Jar. Shields and King & Co remarked that their jars were the cheapest on the market and that a wrench was unnecessary, therefore easier to open, setting them apart from their opponents.

=== Silica deposits ===
In McDermott, Ohio and Newark, Ohio some sandstones contain substances with different levels of purity that are sufficient as a source of silica. Silica sand units were mined throughout Ohio during the Civil War. These units continued to grow; shortly after World War I, large amounts of silica products were produced in Ohio. In the 1900s, these sandstones brought in large amounts of money, especially over the past 35 years. In 1986, 2 million tons of silica sandstone was sold with a value of 24 million dollars. The name Licking County originated from the salt licks found on the river's banks. These salt licks were not only beneficial for glass making but were also enjoyed by the wildlife surrounding the area.

== Later glass manufacturers ==
Holophane, founded in France in 1895, brought its glass technology to Newark, Ohio in 1902. It capitalized on the area's natural resources and skilled workforce. Initially collaborating with the A.H. Heisey Glass Company, Holophane established its own plant in 1910, however Holophane used Heisey-manufactured glass throughout the early 20th century. Heisey started manufacturing in Newark in 1896. In addition to this they worked together on other projects including the restoration of Heisey glass molds. Its creative glass products became essential for industrial and street lighting, particularly during World War II, when it supplied military bases and airfields.

After the war, Holophane expanded operations to nearby cities like Springfield and Pataskala, introduced overhead street lights in 1948, and diversified into decorative lighting. This glass boom extended to Utica, but was short-lived, folding during the Great Depression.

The Holophane company and other production companies were later run by Acuity Brands in 1999. Work changed drastically for the Newark department after Acuity Brands abruptly announced that it would be moving assembly lines to Mexico, leaving several Holophane employees without a job. Despite pushback from Congress in Ohio about their move to Mexico, Acuity was determined to move Holophane productions and dismissed other opinions. In 2008, Acuity Brands was under legal obligation to represent The Bill Clinton Climate Initiative before facing backlash due to the company's negligence in the Clean Water Act.

== See also ==
- Newark, Ohio
- Holophane
- Heisey Glass Company
