= Lloyd Corners, Ohio =

- Unincorporated community
- Location within Ohio Location within the United States
- Coordinates: 40°00′50″N 82°24′12″W
- Country: United States
- State: Ohio
- County: Licking
- Township: Licking
- Elevation: 1,024 ft (312 m)
- Time zone: UTC-5 (Eastern (EST))
  - Summer (DST): UTC-4 (EDT)
- Area code: 740
- GNIS feature ID: 1065013

Lloyd Corners is an unincorporated community in Licking County, Ohio, United States. Lloyd Corners is located on Ohio State Route 13, 3 miles (4.8 km) south of Newark.
