= Leonidas H. Inscho =

American Civil War Medal of Honor recipient

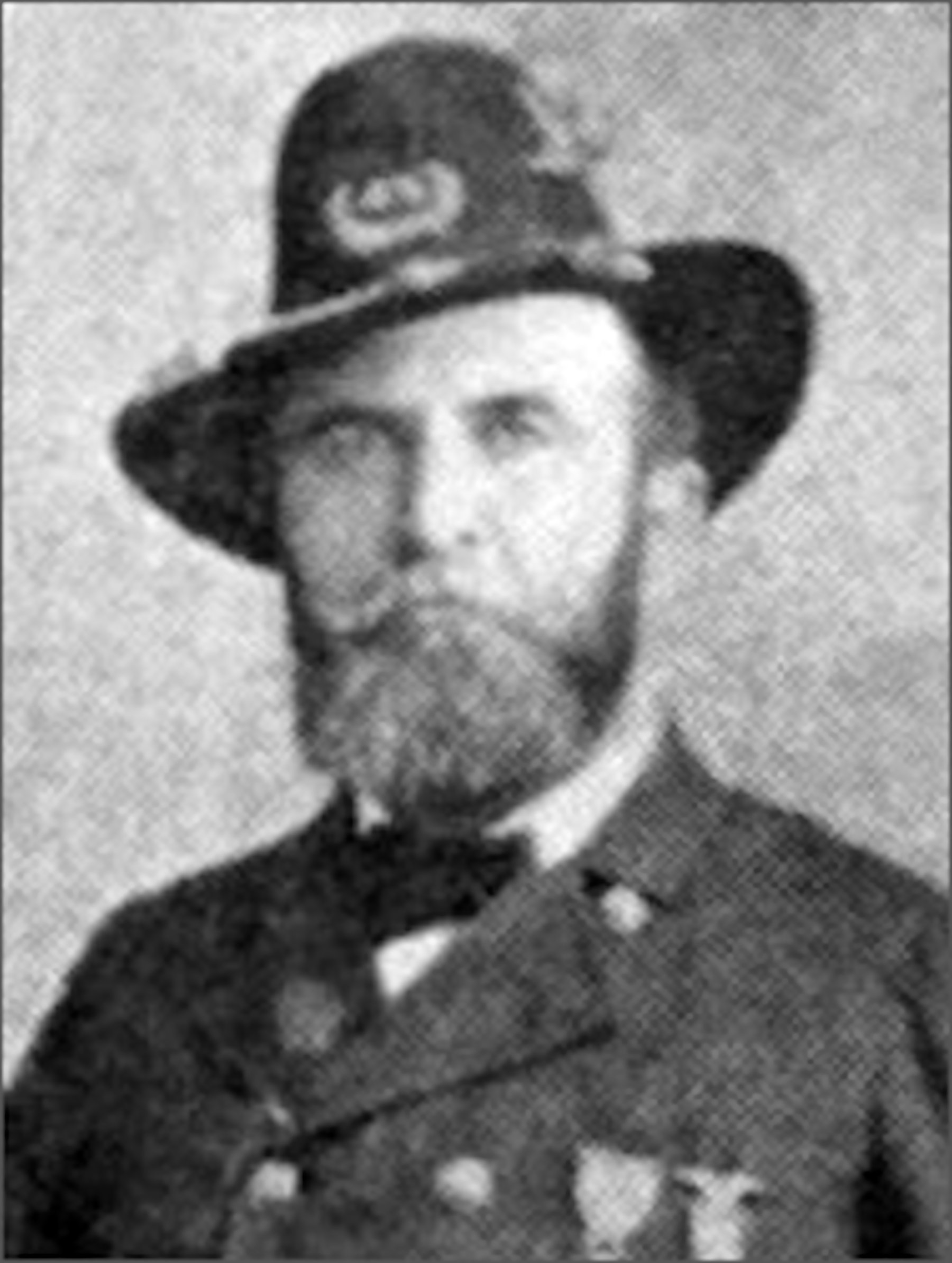
- Inscho in 1895
- Born: 1840; Chatham, Ohio, U.S.
- Died: 1907 (aged 66–67)
- Burial place: Newark, Ohio, U.S.
- Military career
- Rank: Corporal
- Unit: 12th Ohio Infantry
- Conflicts: American Civil War Battle of South Mountain
- Awards: Medal of Honor

Leonidas H. Inscho (1840–1907) was an American soldier and member of the 12th Ohio Infantry who fought in the American Civil War and was awarded the Medal of Honor for capturing a Confederate captain and some of his men, despite an injury to his left hand.

Inscho enlisted in 1861, and was wounded twice, once in 1862, and once in 1863.

He was awarded the Medal of Honor on January 31, 1894.
