= Locust Grove, Licking County, Ohio =

Locust Grove, Ohio
- Unincorporated community
- Location within Ohio Location within the United States
- Coordinates: 40°00′10″N 82°26′16″W
- Country: United States
- State: Ohio
- County: Licking
- Township: Licking
- Elevation: 889 ft (271 m)
- Time zone: UTC-5 (Eastern (EST))
  - Summer (DST): UTC-4 (EDT)
- Area code: 740
- GNIS feature ID: 1042706

Locust Grove is an unincorporated community in Licking County, Ohio, United States. Locust Grove is 4.3 miles (6.9 km) south-southwest of Newark.
