= Career and Technology Education Centers of Licking County =

Public high school in Newark, Ohio, United States

Career and Technology Education Centers of Licking County (C-TEC)

Location
- 150 Price Road; Newark, (Licking County), Ohio 43055; United States; 40°6′0″N 82°25′47″W

Information
- Type: Public, Coeducational high school
- Superintendent: Joyce Malainy
- Grades: 11-12 and adult students
- Accreditation: Accrediting Commission of Career Schools and Colleges
- Website: http://www.c-tec.edu

The Career and Technology Education Centers of Licking County (C-TEC) is a public school with a focus is on preparing high school 11th & 12th graders to be career and college ready. It also has an Adult Education center located on campus that has 15 full time occupational programs and numerous short term classes available.
