= Locust Grove, Ohio =

Locust Grove, Ohio may refer to the following places in Ohio, United States:

- Locust Grove, Adams County, Ohio
- Locust Grove, Licking County, Ohio
- Locust Grove, Mahoning County, Ohio
- Locustgrove, Ohio, in Clark County
