= New Way =

New Way may refer to:

== Political parties ==
- New Way (Israel), a short-lived political faction in Israel in 2001

== Publications ==
- New Way (Jewish newspaper), Новый путь, Novyĭ putʹ, a newspaper of the Russian Empire subtitled еженедв̌льник, посвященный вопросам еврейской жизни, 'A Weekly Dedicated to Questions of Jewish Cultural Life'
- New Way (Naujas Kelias), a Neo-Nazi Publication in Lithuania
- Novy Put, Новый путь, 'New Way', a magazine of the Russian Empire

Many other Russian publications and topics are entitled Новый путь, 'New Way'.

== Towns ==
- New Way, Ohio, a community in the United States
- New Way, Essex, United Kingdom, a hamlet near Harlow

== Music ==
- "New Way (To Light Up an Old Flame)", a single by American country music artist Joe Diffie
