= Denmans Crossroads, Ohio =

Ghost town in Ohio, United States

Coordinates: 40.138°N 82.250°W

Denmans Crossroads is a ghost town in Licking County, in the U.S. state of Ohio.

== History ==
The community was named for the local Denman family. Phillip Denman built the first house in the area in 1813.
