= Fleatown =

Fleatown is the name of two places in the USA:

- Fleatown, Ohio
- former name of Federalsburg, Delaware
