= Fleatown, Ohio =

- Unincorporated community
- Location within Ohio Location within the United States
- Coordinates: 39°59′35″N 82°24′17″W
- Country: United States
- State: Ohio
- County: Licking
- Township: Licking
- Elevation: 902 ft (275 m)
- Time zone: UTC-5 (Eastern (EST))
  - Summer (DST): UTC-4 (EDT)
- Area code: 740
- GNIS feature ID: 1064656

Fleatown is an unincorporated community in Licking County, Ohio, United States. Fleatown is located on Ohio State Route 13, 4.5 miles (7.2 km) south of Newark.

According to Frank K. Gallant, Fleatown may have been so named on account of its unsophisticated character.
