= Perryton, Ohio =

Unincorporated community in Ohio, U.S.

Coordinates: 40°08′40″N 82°12′04″W

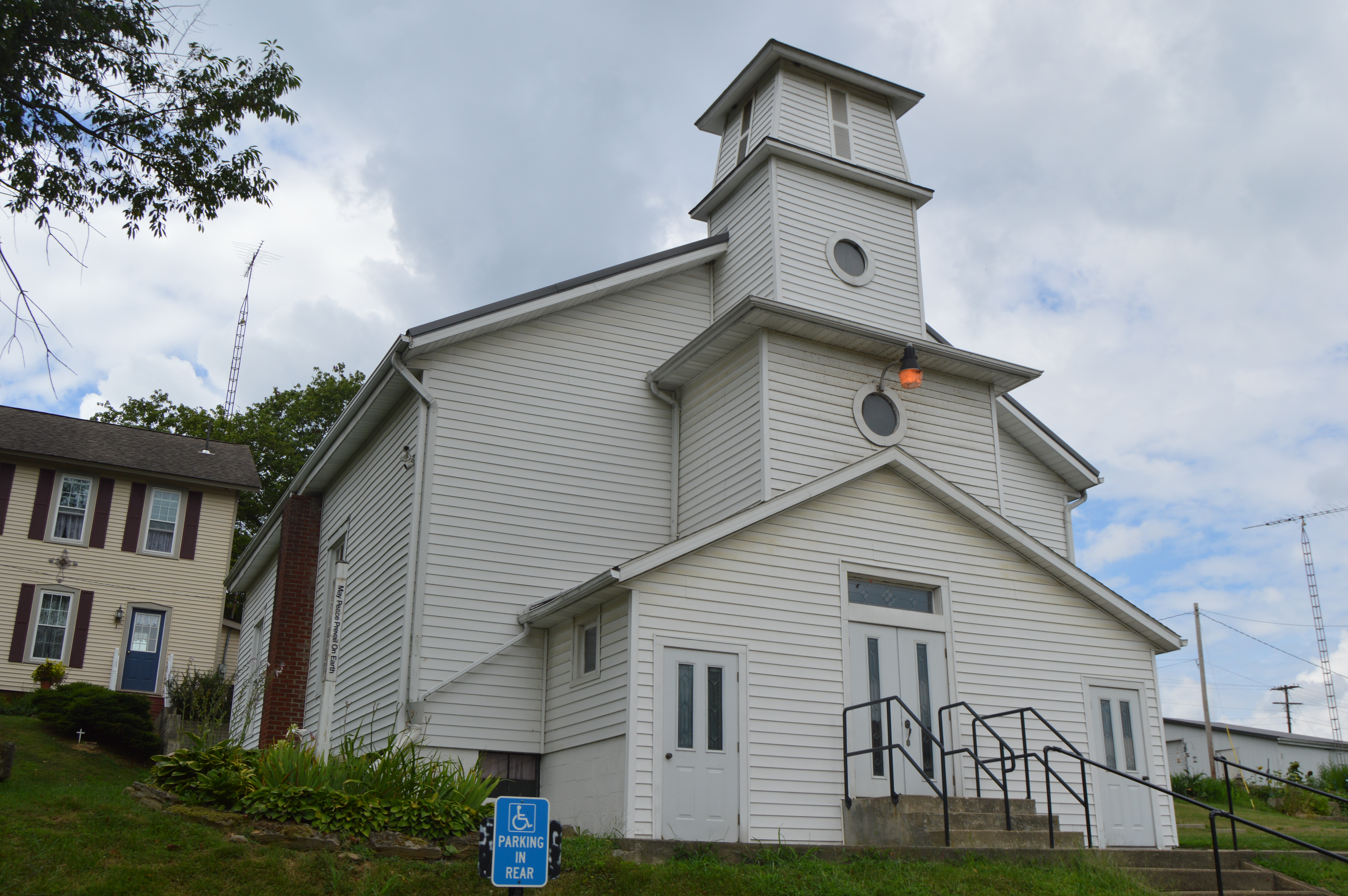
Perryton United Methodist Church

Perryton is an unincorporated community in Licking County, in the U.S. state of Ohio.

== History ==
A post office was established at Perryton in 1836, and remained in operation until 1905. Perryton, like Perry Township, derives its name from Commodore Oliver Hazard Perry.
