= Outville, Ohio =

Unincorporated community in Ohio, U.S.

Coordinates: 39°59′42″N 82°35′45″W

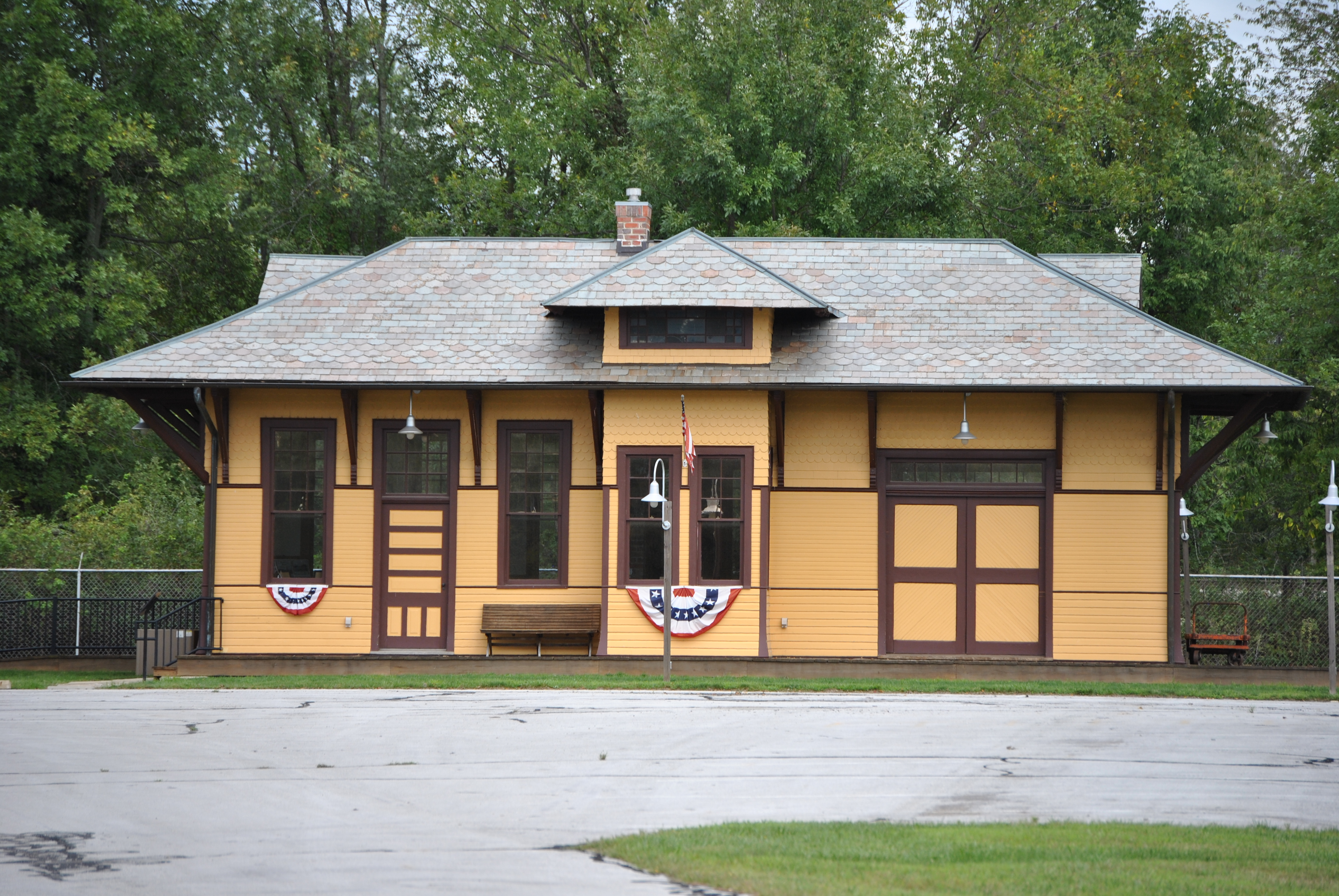
The Outville Depot, a historic site

Outville is an unincorporated community in Licking County, in the U.S. state of Ohio.

== History ==
Outville had its start when the railroad was extended to that point. A post office was established at Outville in 1858, and remained in operation until 1960.
