= Boston, Licking County, Ohio =

Unincorporated community in Ohio, U.S.

Coordinates: 40°04′33″N 82°13′38″W

Boston is an unincorporated community in Licking County, in the U.S. state of Ohio.

== History ==
Boston was founded around 1832 when a store was established there, and the community sprang up around it.
