= Union Station, Ohio =

Unincorporated community in Ohio, U.S.

Coordinates: 40°01′17″N 82°30′46″W

Union Station is an unincorporated community in Licking County, in the U.S. state of Ohio.

== History ==
Union Station had its start as a railroad station in Union Township. A post office was established at Union Station in 1869, and remained in operation until 1918.
