= Columbia Center, Ohio =

Coordinates: 40°0′0″N 82°41′48″W

Columbia Center is a historic neighborhood of the city of Pataskala in Licking County, Ohio, United States. It lies slightly more than 1 mile (1.6 km) west of Pataskala's downtown.

== History ==
Columbia Center was platted around 1850 when the railroad was extended to that point. A post office was established at Columbia Center in 1851, and remained in operation until 1907.
