= Rain Rock, Ohio =

Unincorporated community in Ohio, U.S.

Coordinates: 40°11′34″N 82°17′23″W

Rain Rock is an unincorporated community in Licking County, Ohio.

The community is named for a nearby natural feature called Rainy Rock, a formation of sandstone with a dripping waterfall.
