= Welsh Hills, Ohio =

- Unincorporated community
- Location within Ohio Location within the United States
- Coordinates: 40°05′02″N 82°27′59″W
- Country: United States
- State: Ohio
- County: Licking
- Town: Granville
- Elevation: 950 ft (290 m)
- Time zone: UTC-5 (Central (CST))
  - Summer (DST): UTC-4 (EDT)
- Area code: 740
- GNIS feature ID: 1062592

Welsh Hills is an unincorporated community in Granville, Licking County, Ohio. It was settled by Welsh immigrants and was founded in 1802.
