= Licking County, Ohio =

County in Ohio, United States

- County
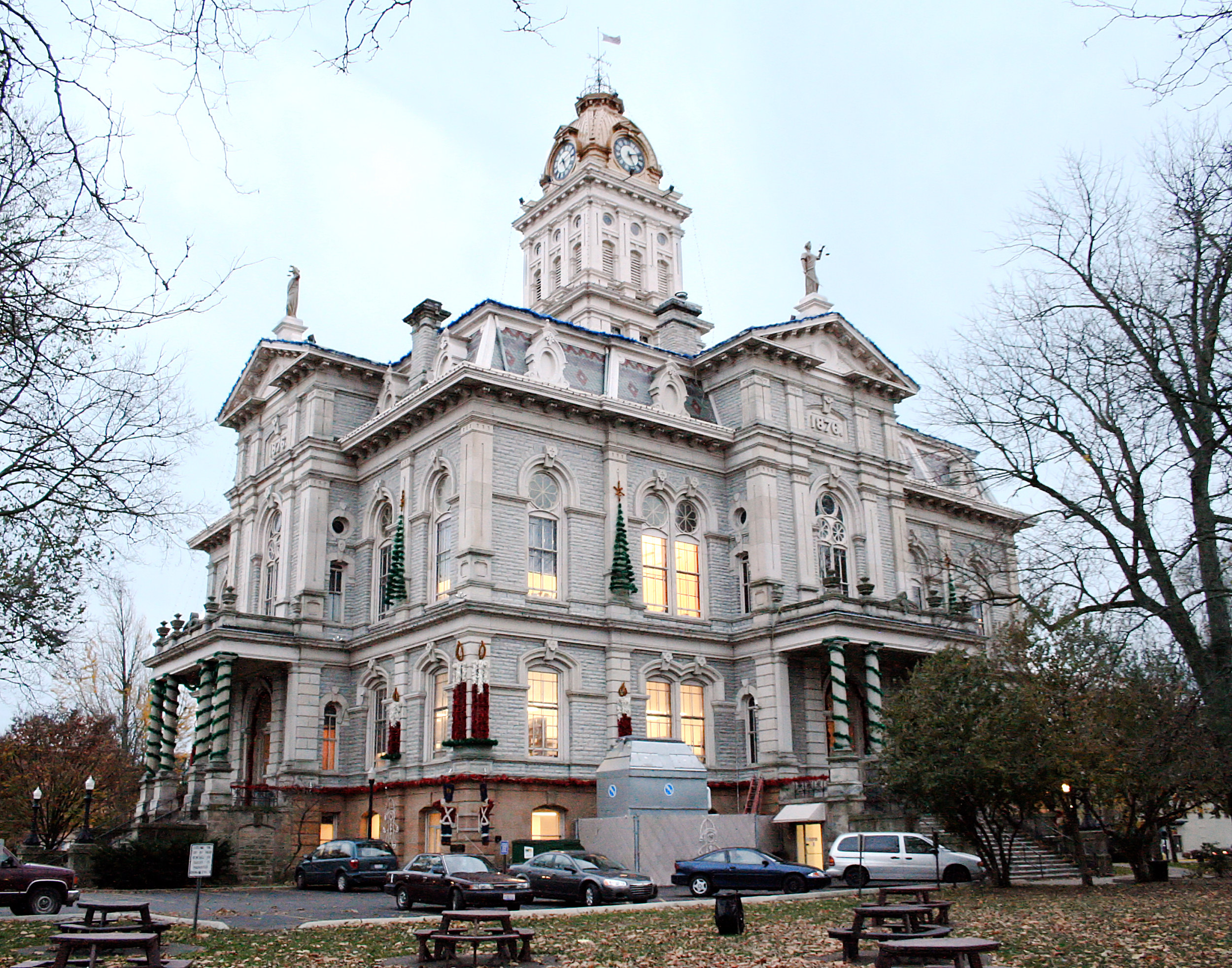
- Licking County Courthouse

- Flag Seal

- Location within the U.S. state of Ohio
- Coordinates: 40°05′N 82°29′W
- Country: United States
- State: Ohio
- Founded: March 1, 1808
- Named for: Licking River
- Seat: Newark
- Largest city: Newark

Area
  - Total: 687 sq mi (1,780 km^{2})
  - Land: 683 sq mi (1,770 km^{2})
  - Water: 5.0 sq mi (13 km^{2}) 0.7%

Population (2020)
  - Total: 178,519
  - Estimate (2025): 185,564 ▲
  - Density: 261/sq mi (101/km^{2})
- Time zone: UTC−5 (Eastern)
  - Summer (DST): UTC−4 (EDT)
- Congressional district: 12th
- Website: lickingcounty.gov

Licking County is located in the central portion of the U.S. state of Ohio. At the 2020 census, the population was 178,519. Its county seat is Newark. The act creating Licking County from parts of Fairfield County was passed on January 30, 1808, and the county was organized on March 1, 1808.

It is named after the Licking River, which is thought to be named for the salt licks that were in the area. However, one account explains it as an English pronunciation of the river's indigenous Delaware name W'li/'ik'/nk, which means "where the flood waters recede".

Licking County is part of the Columbus, OH Metropolitan Statistical Area.

== Geography ==
According to the United States Census Bureau, the county has a total area of 687 square miles (1,780 km^{2}), of which 683 square miles (1,770 km^{2}) is land and 5.0 square miles (13 km^{2}) (0.7%) is water. It is the third-largest county in Ohio by land area.

=== Adjacent counties ===
- Knox County (north)
- Coshocton County (northeast)
- Muskingum County (east)
- Perry County (southeast)
- Fairfield County (southwest)
- Franklin County (west)
- Delaware County (northwest)

=== Major highways ===
- I-70
- US 40
- US 62
- SR 13
- SR 16
- SR 37
- SR 79
- SR 146
- SR 161
- SR 586
- SR 657
- SR 661

== Demographics ==
Historical population
Census	Pop.	Note	%±
1810	3,852		—
1820	11,861		207.9%
1830	20,869		75.9%
1840	35,096		68.2%
1850	38,846		10.7%
1860	37,011		−4.7%
1870	35,756		−3.4%
1880	40,450		13.1%
1890	43,279		7.0%
1900	47,070		8.8%
1910	55,590		18.1%
1920	56,426		1.5%
1930	59,962		6.3%
1940	62,279		3.9%
1950	70,645		13.4%
1960	90,242		27.7%
1970	107,799		19.5%
1980	120,981		12.2%
1990	128,300		6.0%
2000	145,491		13.4%
2010	166,492		14.4%
2020	178,519		7.2%
2025 (est.)	185,564	▲	3.9%
U.S. Decennial Census; 1790-1960 1900-1990; 1990-2000 2010-2020

=== 2020 census ===
As of the 2020 census, the county had a population of 178,519. The median age was 40.4 years. 23.0% of residents were under the age of 18 and 17.5% of residents were 65 years of age or older. For every 100 females there were 96.9 males, and for every 100 females age 18 and over there were 94.4 males age 18 and over.

The racial makeup of the county was 86.3% White, 4.0% Black or African American, 0.3% American Indian and Alaska Native, 2.8% Asian, <0.1% Native Hawaiian and Pacific Islander, 1.1% from some other race, and 5.5% from two or more races. Hispanic or Latino residents of any race comprised 2.2% of the population.

The 2020 census reported that 66.2% of residents lived in urban areas, while 33.8% lived in rural areas.

There were 68,462 households in the county, of which 31.2% had children under the age of 18 living in them. Of all households, 52.2% were married-couple households, 16.6% were households with a male householder and no spouse or partner present, and 23.8% were households with a female householder and no spouse or partner present. About 25.2% of all households were made up of individuals and 11.6% had someone living alone who was 65 years of age or older.

There were 72,709 housing units, of which 5.8% were vacant. Among occupied housing units, 72.5% were owner-occupied and 27.5% were renter-occupied. The homeowner vacancy rate was 1.2% and the rental vacancy rate was 5.9%.

=== Racial and ethnic composition ===
Licking County, Ohio – Racial and ethnic composition Note: the US Census treats Hispanic/Latino as an ethnic category. This table excludes Latinos from the racial categories and assigns them to a separate category. Hispanics/Latinos may be of any race.
Race / ethnicity (NH = Non-Hispanic)	Pop 1980	Pop 1990	Pop 2000	Pop 2010	Pop 2020	% 1980	% 1990	% 2000	% 2010	% 2020
White alone (NH)	117,805	124,737	138,498	153,811	152,935	97.37%	97.22%	95.19%	92.38%	85.67%
Black or African American alone (NH)	2,021	2,198	2,966	5,643	7,142	1.67%	1.71%	2.04%	3.39%	4.00%
Native American or Alaska Native alone (NH)	168	244	414	436	386	0.14%	0.19%	0.28%	0.26%	0.22%
Asian alone (NH)	331	459	841	1,224	4,999	0.27%	0.36%	0.58%	0.74%	2.80%
Native Hawaiian or Pacific Islander alone (NH)	x	x	27	33	45	x	x	0.02%	0.02%	0.03%
Other race alone (NH)	120	58	173	183	787	0.10%	0.05%	0.12%	0.11%	0.44%
Mixed race or Multiracial (NH)	x	x	1,465	2,850	8,237	x	x	1.01%	1.71%	4.61%
Hispanic or Latino (any race)	536	604	1,107	2,312	3,988	0.44%	0.47%	0.76%	1.39%	2.23%
Total	120,981	128,300	145,491	166,492	178,519	100.00%	100.00%	100.00%	100.00%	100.00%

=== 2010 census ===
As of the census of 2010, there were 166,492 people, 63,989 households, and 45,162 families living in the county. The population density was 243.9 inhabitants per square mile (94.2/km^{2}). There were 69,291 housing units at an average density of 101.5 units per square mile (39.2 units/km^{2}). The racial makeup of the county was 93.2% white, 3.4% black or African American, 0.7% Asian, 0.3% American Indian, 0.4% from other races, and 1.9% from two or more races. Those of Hispanic or Latino origin made up 1.4% of the population. In terms of ancestry, 29.5% were German, 16.0% were Irish, 13.0% were English, 10.8% were American, and 5.5% were Italian.

Of the 63,989 households, 34.2% had children under the age of 18 living with them, 54.5% were married couples living together, 11.2% had a female householder with no husband present, 29.4% were non-families, and 23.8% of households were made up of individuals. The average household size was 2.55 and the average family size was 3.00. The median age was 39.1 years.

The median household income was $53,291 and the median family income was $64,386. Males had a median income of $47,391 versus $37,054 for females. The per capita income for the county was $25,534. About 8.2% of families and 11.1% of the population were below the poverty line, including 15.7% of those under age 18 and 6.5% of those age 65 or over.

=== 2000 census ===
As of the census of 2000, there were 145,491 people, 55,609 households, and 40,149 families living in the county. The population density was 212 inhabitants per square mile (82/km^{2}). There were 58,760 housing units at an average density of 86 units per square mile (33 units/km^{2}). The racial makeup of the county was 95.64% White, 2.06% Black or African American, 0.30% Native American, 0.58% Asian, 0.02% Pacific Islander, 0.30% from other races, and 1.10% from two or more races. 0.76% of the population were Hispanic or Latino of any race. Of the 55,609 households 34.40% had children under the age of 18 living with them, 58.50% were married couples living together, 10.00% had a female householder with no husband present, and 27.80% were non-families. 23.10% of households were one person and 9.10% were one person aged 65 or older. The average household size was 2.56 and the average family size was 3.01.

The age distribution was 26.00% under the age of 18, 8.80% from 18 to 24, 29.40% from 25 to 44, 23.90% from 45 to 64, and 11.90% 65 or older. The median age was 37 years. For every 100 females there were 94.80 males. For every 100 females age 18 and over, there were 92.00 males.

The median household income was $44,124 and the median family income was $51,969. Males had a median income of $37,957 versus $26,884 for females. The per capita income for the county was $20,581. About 5.50% of families and 7.50% of the population were below the poverty line, including 9.10% of those under age 18 and 7.50% of those age 65 or over.

== Politics ==
Prior to 1944, Licking County primarily supported Democratic Party candidates in presidential elections, only voting for Republican candidates five times from 1856 to 1940 in five national landslides for the party. From 1944 onward, the county has become a Republican stronghold presidentially, with the only Democratic presidential candidate to win the county since then being Lyndon B. Johnson in the midst of his 1964 national landslide.

United States presidential election results for Licking County, Ohio
Year	Republican		Democratic		Third party(ies)	
Year	No.	%	No.	%	No.	%
1856	3,027	44.42%	3,371	49.46%	417	6.12%
1860	3,502	47.06%	3,154	42.38%	786	10.56%
1864	3,312	46.22%	3,853	53.78%	0	0.00%
1868	3,487	44.03%	4,432	55.97%	0	0.00%
1872	3,493	43.01%	4,562	56.17%	67	0.82%
1876	3,962	41.84%	5,473	57.79%	35	0.37%
1880	4,210	42.62%	5,575	56.44%	93	0.94%
1884	4,599	42.97%	5,958	55.67%	145	1.35%
1888	4,867	43.04%	6,199	54.82%	241	2.13%
1892	4,619	41.97%	6,038	54.87%	348	3.16%
1896	5,560	45.32%	6,611	53.89%	96	0.78%
1900	5,854	46.09%	6,716	52.88%	130	1.02%
1904	6,798	51.04%	6,019	45.19%	503	3.78%
1908	6,756	44.55%	7,685	50.67%	725	4.78%
1912	4,487	33.73%	6,120	46.01%	2,694	20.25%
1916	5,935	40.93%	8,183	56.43%	382	2.63%
1920	11,924	51.89%	10,679	46.47%	378	1.64%
1924	13,914	58.49%	7,428	31.23%	2,446	10.28%
1928	19,130	72.14%	7,244	27.32%	143	0.54%
1932	13,355	48.01%	13,904	49.99%	556	2.00%
1936	11,958	39.37%	17,785	58.56%	629	2.07%
1940	16,288	49.86%	16,379	50.14%	0	0.00%
1944	16,815	56.74%	12,819	43.26%	0	0.00%
1948	15,164	54.62%	12,511	45.07%	87	0.31%
1952	20,385	63.50%	11,718	36.50%	0	0.00%
1956	21,912	67.44%	10,581	32.56%	0	0.00%
1960	23,653	63.95%	13,335	36.05%	0	0.00%
1964	15,096	39.25%	23,364	60.75%	0	0.00%
1968	19,542	48.89%	15,021	37.58%	5,407	13.53%
1972	28,070	66.47%	12,460	29.50%	1,702	4.03%
1976	23,518	53.78%	19,247	44.01%	968	2.21%
1980	28,425	58.28%	17,208	35.28%	3,136	6.43%
1984	37,560	72.26%	13,995	26.93%	421	0.81%
1988	34,540	66.72%	16,793	32.44%	434	0.84%
1992	26,918	44.54%	18,898	31.27%	14,618	24.19%
1996	28,276	48.78%	22,624	39.03%	7,067	12.19%
2000	37,180	59.52%	23,196	37.13%	2,090	3.35%
2004	49,016	61.72%	30,053	37.84%	351	0.44%
2008	46,918	56.82%	33,932	41.09%	1,720	2.08%
2012	45,503	55.80%	34,201	41.94%	1,846	2.26%
2016	51,241	61.28%	27,376	32.74%	5,007	5.99%
2020	59,514	63.05%	33,055	35.02%	1,827	1.94%
2024	61,359	64.20%	32,832	34.35%	1,390	1.45%

United States Senate election results for Licking County, Ohio1
Year	Republican		Democratic		Third party(ies)	
Year	No.	%	No.	%	No.	%
2024	55,320	58.66%	35,373	37.51%	3,616	3.83%

== Industry and business ==
=== Early history ===
Since Licking County's establishment in 1808, businesses and industries have served as a source of employment, generating income and promoting economic growth. Notable industries include manufacturing, retail and wholesale trade, health care and social assistance, accommodation and food services. Manufacturing, agriculture, and services prove to be the major sectors of Licking County's industry.

==== Manufacturing ====
Manufacturing is one of the largest industry sectors in Licking County. Major establishments and advancements have been made by manufacturing facilities in the county by renowned companies or corporations, namely Invenergy, Armstrong World Industries, Intel, and Atkore. These investments have provided Licking County residents with a diverse range of employment opportunities and facilitated its economic growth. However, in the past many other successful manufacturing companies have come to a close, such as Longaberger, Fyrepel, Meritor plant in Heath, and E.T. Rugg. The glass-making industry, which has been established since the late 19th century from Newark with natural gas supplies, sand quarry, and cheap labor, is also a significant manufacturing sector in Licking County. A.H. Heisey & Co. in Newark was a major manufacturer of Early American Pressed Glass (EAPG).

==== Agriculture ====
Agriculture is regarded as a traditional cornerstone of Licking County. Within Licking County, agriculture has always been a significant industry, and in the 1800s, it was a top producer of corn, wheat, and oats. The formation of the Licking County Agricultural Society in 1832, as well as the creation of the Ohio and Erie Canal, helped boost agriculture in Licking County during this time period. Farmers benefited from easy access to markets via railroads, and different companies would supply tools to local farmers. In the later end of the 1800s, Licking County was in the top ten of counties within Ohio for agricultural production. By 1870, 2,692 farms with 278,611 improved acres were owned by farmers within Licking County; all of these helped account for $3,500,000 in production. Licking County ranked very high within the state of Ohio in production of corn, wheat, and oats while also leading the state in wool production. By 1887, 150,000 acres of designated pasture land was readily available and Licking County ranked first in Ohio with over 174,000 sheep within the county.

In the 19th century, Licking County farms produced a variety of crops like corn, wheat, and oats, along with livestock such as cattle, chickens, pigs and lambs. Farms relied on labor-intensive methods of farming, using crop rotation and the spread of manure to keep the soil fertile.

As of 2017, Licking County ranks 11th out of 88 counties in Ohio for products sold, and agriculture is still an important industry. Currently, Licking County is focused on large-scale production of grains and oilseeds, in particular corn and soybeans. This accounted for two-thirds of the county's agricultural sales in 2017, according to the USDA Census of Agriculture. Modern agricultural methods involve chemicals and mechanization, which support a shift from traditional to modern farming practices.

Charles Metz and Brothers Meat Market, a local agricultural company located in Newark, is a well known meat provider for regional butchers and markets. Weiant Greenhouses was another local company that grew lettuce. It covered five acres of glass structures, becoming one of the largest greenhouses in Ohio and providing vegetables to three nearby states during its time. Unfortunately, it came to a close after a destructive storm in 1978. While modern farmers have multiple advantages such as better agricultural equipment, pesticides and fertilizers, many have encountered challenges due to an increase in the cost of producing crops and raising livestock, and a declining payout as well.

==== Services ====
The service industry, as a whole, has provided jobs for more than 30% of the employed population in Licking County. From housing and dining services to entertainment services, a variety of services have been available in Licking County. Among these, Education Services and Accommodations & Food Services are considered the major forms of services. Educational institutions in Licking County include Denison University, Newark City Schools, and Columbus State Community College.

=== Contemporary business and industry ===
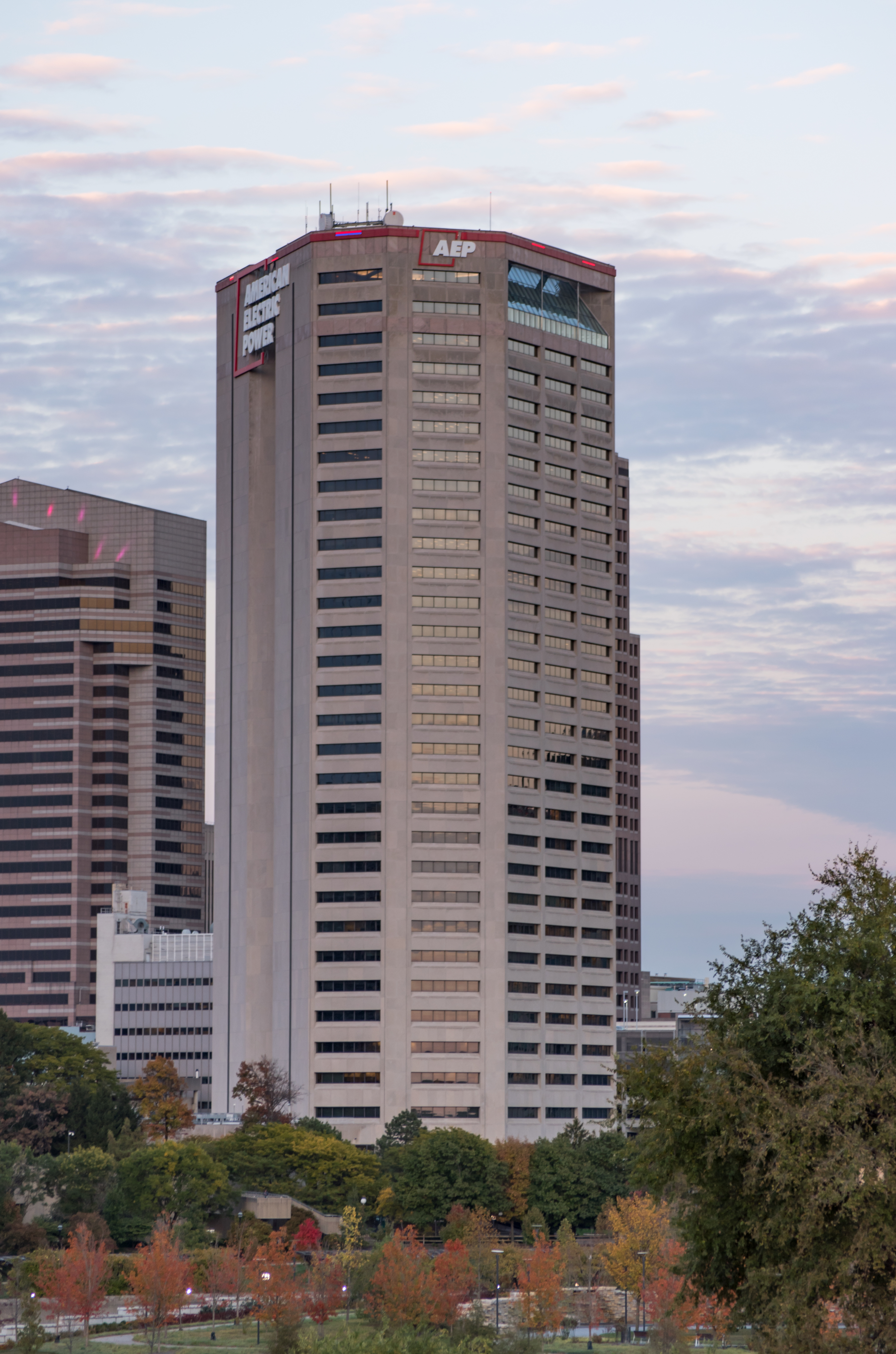
AEP headquarters building in Columbus, Ohio

Licking County continues to see substantial growth in industries across multiple fields, especially traditional companies with major distribution. Manufacturing, Retail Trade, Health Care and Social Assistance are the top three industries in Licking County's employment for recent years.

From 2017 to 2022, the number of jobs increased by 22.6% in Licking County, compared to the national growth rate of 3.8%. The number of jobs is projected to grow an additional 7,455 over the next 5 years. Licking County's manufacturing economy continued to grow with a 12% increase in manufacturing jobs between 2017 and 2022.

In January 2022 Intel announced their intention to build a $20 billion semiconductor plant in Licking County that would employ up to 3,000 workers. The facility will be built on a 3,190-acre site (1,290 ha) that has been annexed from the Jersey Township to New Albany. In March 2023, Invenergy invested $600 million in Illuminate USA, with the goal of manufacturing high-quality domestic solar panels and creating 850 new, high-paying jobs.

Top 10 employers in Licking County (2018):

1. Amazon
2. Licking Memorial
3. Ascena Retail
4. Kroger
5. Licking County Government
6. Owens Corning
7. AEP Ohio
8. L Brands
9. Anomatic
10. Denison University

== Places of interest ==
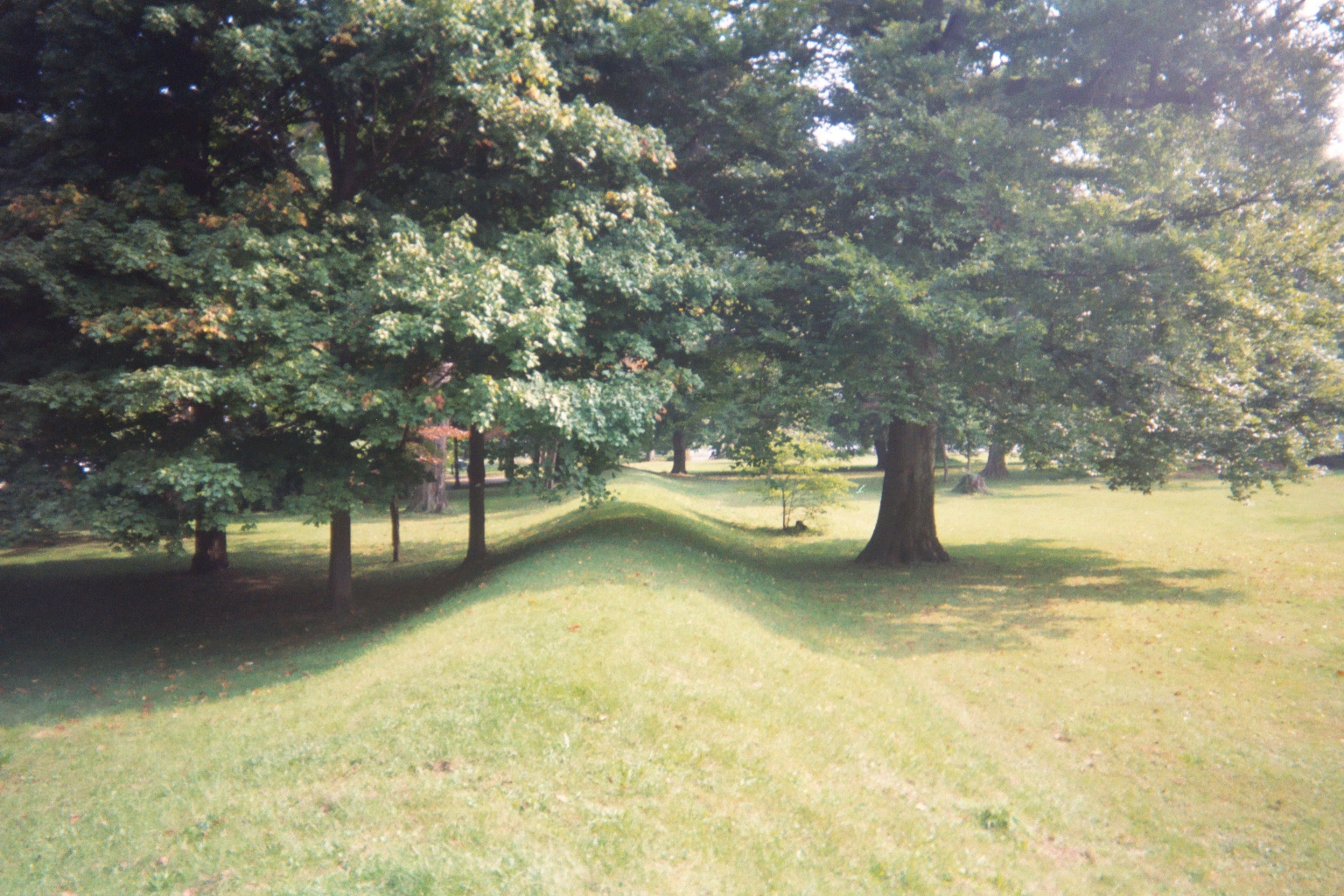
View from a section of the Great Circle Earthworks, part of the Newark Earthworks.

- Newark Earthworks – the Great Circle and Octagon Earthworks are components of the Hopewell Ceremonial Earthworks, which were designated a UNESCO World Heritage Site in 2023.
- Blackhand Gorge State Nature Preserve
- Flint Ridge State Memorial
- Dawes Arboretum
- Ye Olde Mill in Utica, where Velvet ice cream is produced.
- Heisey Glass Museum
- Longaberger former basket facility (Main office building was a 7-story replica basket, the largest in the world)
- National Trail Raceway – NHRA Dragstrip
- Denison University
- Home Building Association Bank

== Historic family farms ==
There are 29 farms within Licking County that have been designated as historic family farms by the Ohio Historic Family Farm Program. This program helps designate farms that have been consecutively owned by the same family for one hundred years or more. There are three designations that are offered by the program: Century Farms (100–149 years), Sesquicentennial Farms (150–199 years), and Bicentennial Farms (200 and more years). To be approved into Ohio's Historic Family Farms Program, ten or more acres of land must be used for agricultural use. If the farm is under ten acres, $2,500 of income must be produced yearly. The owners also must provide an 8.5x11-inch map and a current photograph of the farm. Verifiable family records must be shown to prove that the farm has been within 100 years of consecutive ownership by the family. Once a farm has received this designation, the family must continue to farm the land to stay a historic family farm.

=== Licking County Historic Family Farms List ===
This is a list of all 29 Historic Family Farms, as of August 5, 2025. Officially recorded by the Ohio Department of Agriculture. Ordered by family last name:

Family Last Name	Farm Name	Farm Founding Year
Ashbrook Berry		1859
Baker	Baker's Acres	1917
Carr		1911
Coad		1830
Elsen	Sycamore Terrace	1876
Etsy	Wilkin-Hunt-Etsy	1829
Fackler	Jones Suns-Ray Farm LLC	1920
Fisk	Fisk Family Enterprises Ltd. LLC	1876
Garvin	Heritage Farm	1890
Goodman	Otter Creek Farm	1908
Gutridge	Sunnyside Farm	1864
Hatfield	6331 Bennington Chapel LLC	1831
Hupp		1878
Maxwell	Maxwell Keystone Inheritance Trust	1906
McCoy	Davison Family Farm LLC	1858
Newell	Benner Farm	1876
Rabb	Francis Family Farm	1809
Shaw	Shaw Property Management Trust	1883
Seigel		1915
Stevenson		1890
Stiers		1901
Swinehart	Swinehart Family	1899
Swinehart	Woolard/Swinehart Family	1906
Taylor	Gieseck Family Farm	1864
Todd	Grand View Farm	1833
Wagy	Wagy Family Farm	1844
Warner	Eshelman-Warner Farm	1898
Wells	Wells Farm	1893
West	West Kine Akrs	1877

=== Challenges facing historic family farms ===
Despite their recognition, many families are facing pressure to sell their historic family farms, due to increased urbanization and commercial growth in areas such as New Albany. Rising land values and frequent offers from developers encourage farmers to sell their land for commercial or residential use. In New Albany, a nine-million-square-foot business park and the addition of over 100 homes every year, are two examples that may affect the historic family farms in the area. The increasing urbanization and development of residential land may damage the preservation of a family's historic farm.

Family farms have begun to face increased economic difficulties in the county and subsequently, farmers are forced to work other jobs. Additionally, the average age of a farm operator is 56.8 years old and many of these family farms cannot find family members to inherit these farms. Due to this, some historic farms are at risk of losing their Historic Family Farm status. In response to the recent economic pressures, many historic farming families have reduced active cultivation for conservation purposes. Despite these changes and different pressures, the USDA Census reported that in 2017, 99% of all Licking County farms were still registered as family-owned.

== Sports ==
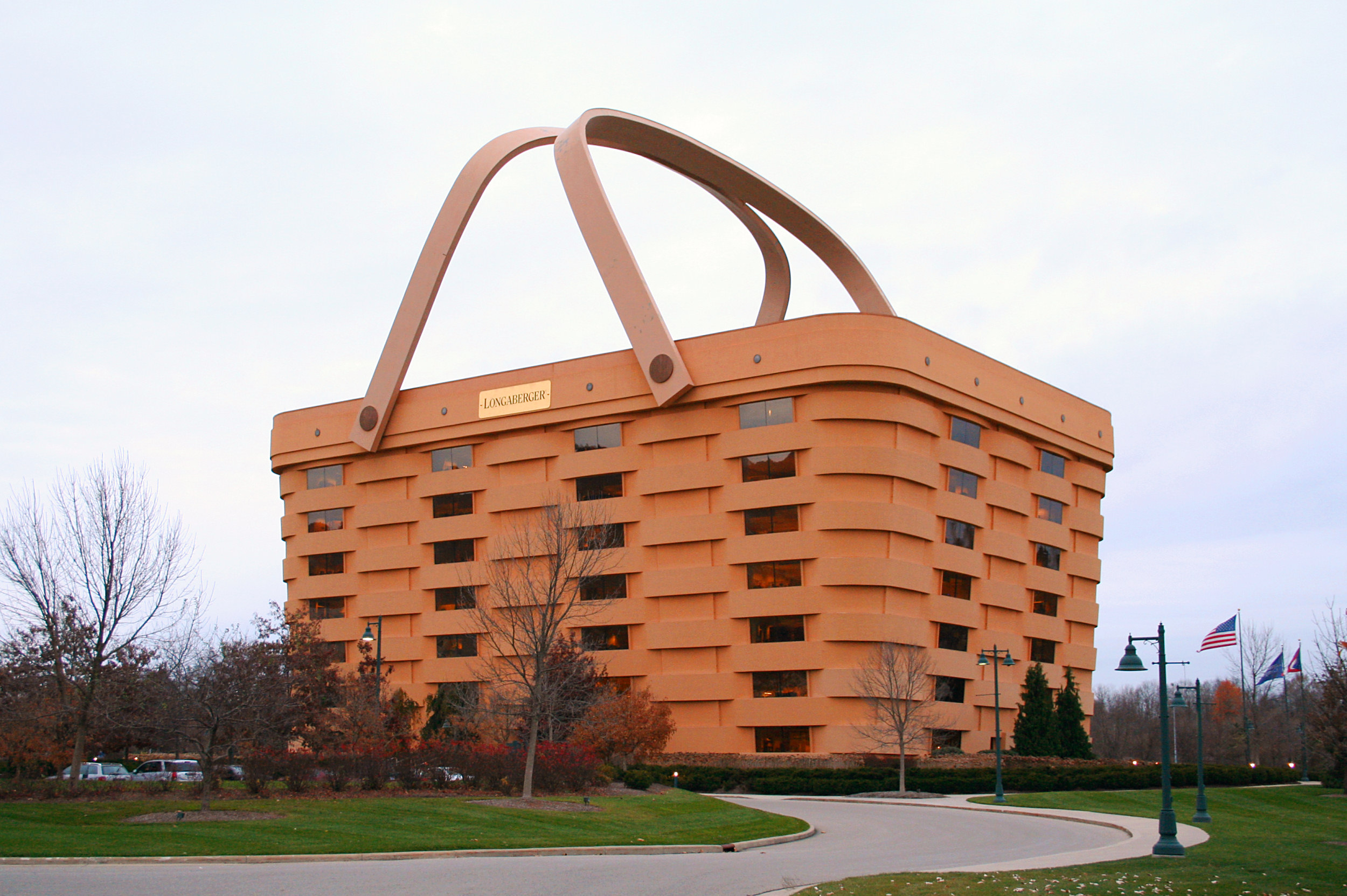
Longaberger former headquarters in Newark, Ohio, a giant Longaberger medium market basket.

Licking County high school athletic programs include Granville High School, Heath High School, Johnstown-Monroe High School, Lakewood High School, Licking Valley High School, Licking Heights High School, Newark Catholic High School, Newark High School, Northridge High School, Utica High School, and Watkins Memorial High School. From 2002 through 2007, at least one Licking County high school won an OHSAA state baseball championship each year: Newark Catholic High School in 2002, 2003, 2004, and 2006; Heath High School in 2002 and 2007; and Lakewood High School in 2005. Newark Catholic High School and Heath High School have combined for nine state titles in a six-year span.

Licking County schools won at least one state title in four straight sport seasons: Heath in both baseball and boys track and field (2007), Newark Catholic in football (2007), Newark in boys basketball (2008) and Lakewood in softball (2008).

In 2025, Licking Valley High School won the OHSAA Division III baseball state championship, defeating University School 1–0 in the title game. It was the program's first state baseball championship.

== Opioid and overdose crisis ==
In line with national and regional trends, opioid misuse led to increased rates of overdose and fatalities in Licking County over the last two decades. Opioids, which encompass a variety of drugs, are often used for pain relief. However, when opioids are taken in large doses, they can be fatal. Synthetic varieties of opioids, such as fentanyl, have been listed as one of the main contributors to the ongoing crisis. Evidence indicates that the opioid and overdose crises in Licking County have been affected by unemployment in the region, economic inequalities, and local, state, and federal responses to the crises. Amidst the COVID-19 pandemic, one director of a residential treatment center attributed isolation to the rise in overdose deaths across Licking County. Others have attributed the rise in overdose deaths to a rise in fentanyl and its analogues in the drug supply.

=== Statistics ===
Since 2001, unintentional drug overdose deaths in Licking County have increased. Between 2001 and 2010, the number of unintentional overdose fatalities per year ranged from four to 24. From 2011 to 2020, annual overdose deaths ranged from 13 to 47 per year. In 2022, 58 people died in Licking County due to unintentional drug overdoses. Licking County Memorial Health Systems found out that when focusing on fentanyl related deaths, the number increased by over 1000% between 2014 and 2018, from 2 to 21 deaths. The Licking County Health Department reported that fentanyl played a role in nearly three quarters of overdose deaths in 2020 and 2021.

=== Overdose mapping ===
In 2020, the Licking County Health Department introduced a new overdose mapping system that began tracking fatal and nonfatal overdose cases in the region. The system was designed, in part, to identify surges in overdoses that could then allow for more efficient and effective distribution of naloxone, a drug that reverses opioid overdose. It is possible that the recent increases in overdoses throughout Licking County may be the result of more overdoses being reported across the county as a result of overdose mapping.

=== Demographics ===
In 2021, of the 47 opioid related death, the primary group affected was white males between the ages 25-44. Annual data from the Licking County overdose fatality review illustrates 72% of overdoses in 2021 were male, while the remaining 28% were female. The most affected age range was 35-44 years old, with 15 deaths, followed closely by those aged 25-34, with 14 deaths. Additionally, 94% of deaths in 2021 were White/Caucasian and 6% were Black/African American. Regarding the level of education of those affected, 59.6% were high school graduates or had a GED, while 17% did not graduate high school. Additionally, 12.8% had a college education without a degree, and 8.5% held a college undergraduate degree.

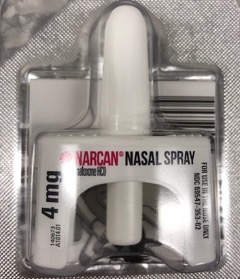
One method of stopping an overdose is applying narcan to the person's nose.

=== Refusal of Syringe Services Program ===
Syringe services programs (SSPs) offer drug users clean injection equipment and often other services, like referrals to treatment facilities, access to naloxone, and screenings for disease. Evidence indicates that SSPs help prevent the spread of disease, increase the likelihood that drug users will enter treatment, and decrease overdose deaths. Unsanitary syringe use has been a cause for the Hepatitis-C cases in the County. Despite these facts, in 2019, the Licking County Health Department unanimously voted against implementing a syringe exchange program in the county, and in 2024 it indicated that it was not willing to revisit its decision. Various organizations have taken issue with the Health Department's, decision, such as Licking County's branch of OhioCAN.

=== Resources available ===
Programs have emerged in Licking County to address the opioid and overdose crises.The Licking County Linkages Program helps individuals recovering from substance addiction by providing health care. In addition, their goals also revolve around reducing stigmas surrounding substance abuse as well as informing the general public of the dangers of drug consumption. Other services throughout Licking County include disposal of unwanted pills which can be done at several police stations within the county.

== Communities ==
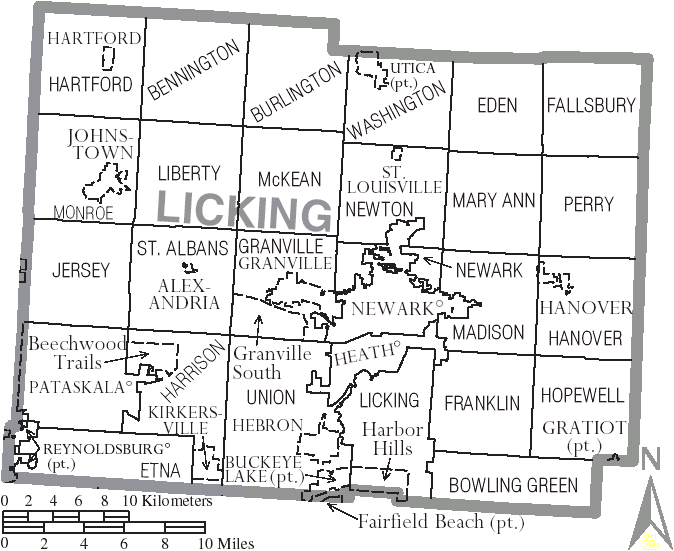
Map of Licking County, Ohio with Municipal and Township Labels

=== Cities ===
- Heath
- Johnstown
- New Albany
- Newark (county seat)
- Pataskala
- Reynoldsburg

=== Villages ===
- Alexandria
- Buckeye Lake
- Granville
- Gratiot
- Hanover
- Hartford
- Hebron
- Kirkersville
- St. Louisville
- Utica

=== Townships ===
- Bennington
- Bowling Green
- Burlington
- Eden
- Etna
- Fallsbury
- Franklin
- Granville
- Hanover
- Harrison
- Hartford
- Hopewell
- Jersey
- Liberty
- Licking
- Madison
- Mary Ann
- McKean
- Monroe
- Newark
- Newton
- Perry
- St. Albans
- Union
- Washington

=== Census-designated places ===
- Beechwood Trails
- Brownsville
- Etna
- Granville South
- Harbor Hills
- Jacksontown
- Jersey
- Marne

=== Unincorporated communities ===
- Amsterdam
- Appleton
- Boston
- Chatham
- Columbia Center
- Fleatown
- Fredonia
- Homer
- Linnville
- Lloyd Corners
- Locust Grove
- Luray
- New Way
- Outville
- Perryton
- Rain Rock
- Toboso
- Union Station
- Wagram
- Welsh Hills
- Wilkins Run

== See also ==
- National Register of Historic Places listings in Licking County, Ohio
