= Appleton, Ohio =

Unincorporated community in Ohio, U.S.

Coordinates: 40°12′33″N 82°36′59″W

Appleton is an unincorporated community in Licking County, in the U.S. state of Ohio.

== History ==
Appleton was laid out in 1832. A post office was established at Appleton in 1836, and remained in operation until 1904.
