= Amsterdam, Licking County, Ohio =

Unincorporated community in Ohio, U.S.

Coordinates: 39°57′27″N 82°22′42″W

Amsterdam is an unincorporated community in Licking County, in the U.S. state of Ohio.

== History ==
Amsterdam had its start when the National Road was extended to that point. The town was laid out in 1830. An old variant name of the community was Melgen. A post office called Melgen was established in 1888, and remained in operation until 1901.
