= Wilkins Run, Ohio =

Unincorporated community in Ohio, U.S.

Coordinates: 40°07′47″N 82°20′39″W

Wilkins Run is an unincorporated community in Licking County, in the U.S. state of Ohio.

== History ==
A post office was established at Wilkins Run in 1858, and remained in operation until 1902. The community was named for Henry and Daniel Wilkins, early settlers.
