= Anomatic =

Anomatic Corporation manufactures aluminum products, and is a manufacturer of large-quantity aluminum parts for cosmetic companies' packaging including Revlon, Maybelline, Estee Lauder and Mary Kay.

== History ==
Since 1965, Anomatic has been manufacturing items ranging from consumer products such as MP3 players, cookware, and baseball bats to industrial applications such as heat sinks and aerospace/aviation components.

== Product lines ==
The company produces anodized aluminum packaging for the personal care, makeup, fragrance, automotive, pharmaceutical, health and beauty industries for clients as well as industrial applications. It is headquartered in New Albany, Ohio with additional US manufacturing locations in Newark, Ohio, Blacklick, Ohio, Naugatuck, Connecticut, and an international facility in Suzhou, China. Anomatic’s services include package design, rapid 3D prototyping, metal forming, anodizing, decorating, assembly, and metallization.

== Environmental policies ==
The company has implemented a sustainability plan to reduce energy, waste, water and air pollution as well as recycle and reuse materials. In 2010, Anomatic announced the formation of the Sustainability and Environmental Operations Group which works to expand the company’s sustainable and green operations through Lean, Six Sigma and GMP.
