= Velvet Ice Cream Company =

American food company

Velvet Ice Cream
- Company type: Private
- Industry: Ice cream
- Founded: 1914
- Headquarters: Utica, Ohio, United States
- Key people: Joseph Dager (Founder)
- Products: Ice cream
- Revenue: $30 million
- Number of employees: 125
- Website: velveticecream.com

Velvet Ice Cream, is an ice cream manufacturer located in Utica, Ohio.

== History ==
Velvet, founded in 1914 in Utica, Ohio, by Joseph Dager, a Lebanese immigrant, is a family-owned and operated fourth generation ice cream manufacturer. Dager began the company in the basement of a Utica confectionary. In 1960, Velvet relocated to 'Ye Olde Mill', one mile south of the original location. In 2009, Joseph C. Dager became chairman of the board. Joe's daughter, Luconda, became president and Joanne and Andre Dager become vice-presidents. In 2015, Velvet began construction on a $3 million warehouse/freezer/distribution center.

== Ye Olde Mill ==
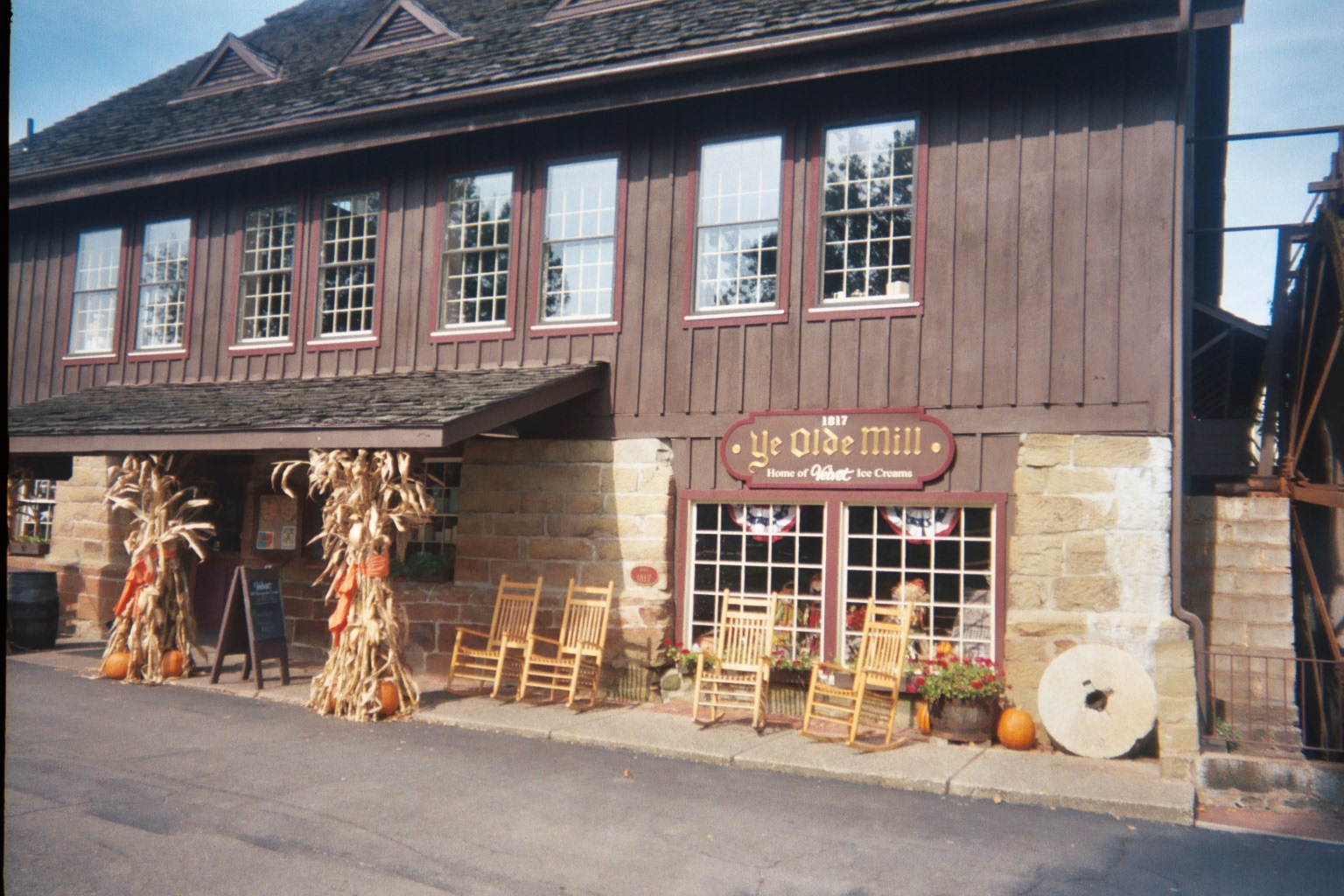
Ye Olde Mill entrance

The headquarters of Velvet, 'Ye Olde Mill', is situated on a 20-acre park-like setting. It has an ice cream museum, visitor center, and a working ice cream shop. It attracts more than 150,000 visitors per year.

Since 1974, Ye Olde Mill has been home to the Utica Ice Cream Festival, held annually on Memorial Day.

== Operations ==
Velvet has sales of over $30 million per year, and distributes more than 5 million gallons of ice cream each year. The company has retail distribution in Ohio, Indiana, Kentucky and West Virginia. It has food service distribution in 26 states.

In April 2021, the company issued a voluntary recall on its ice cream and sherbet products over concerns of possible listeria contamination.
