= Holophane =

Lighting company

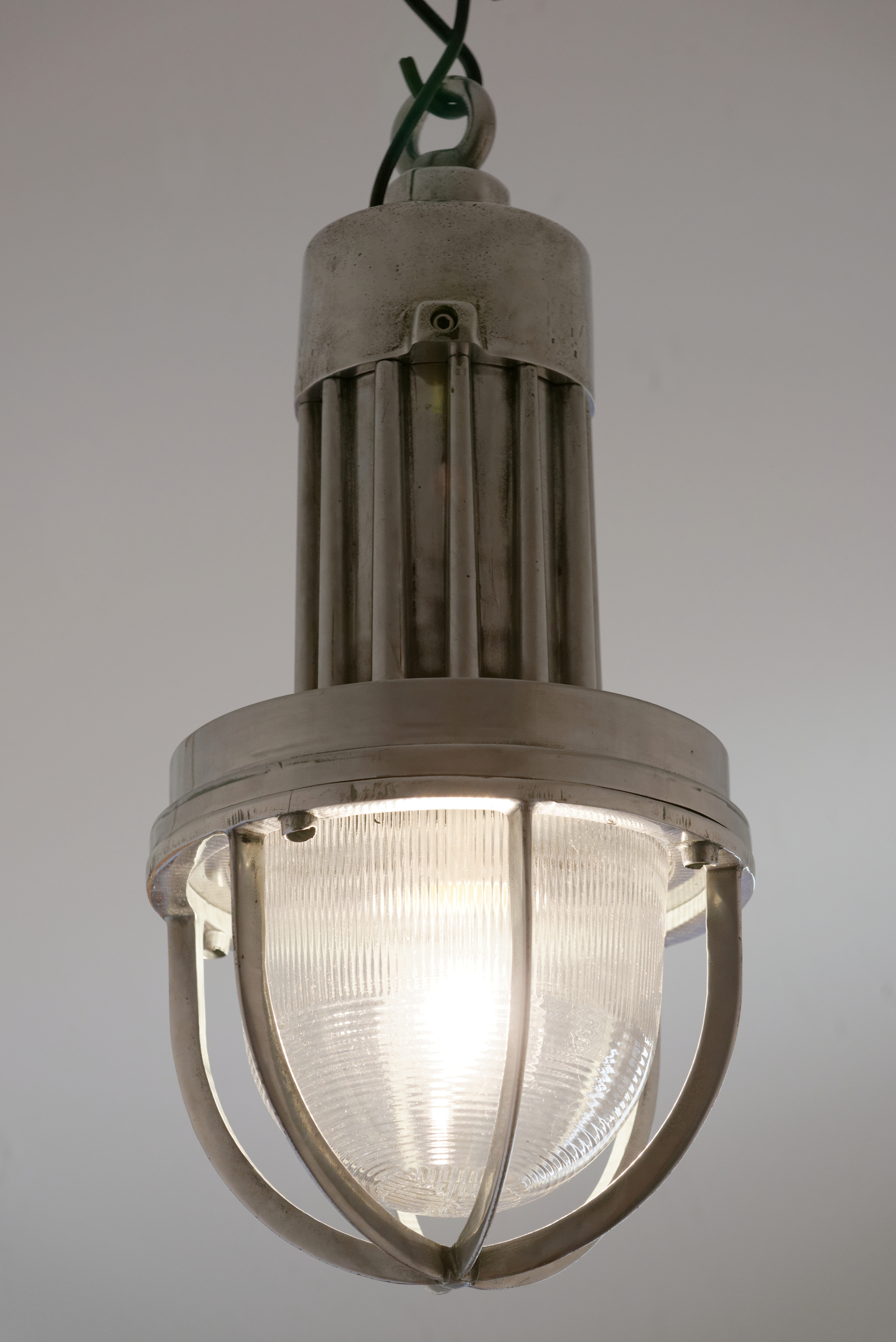
Vintage industrial Holophane pendant light

Holophane, a division of Acuity Brands, is a manufacturer of lighting-related products founded in 1898 in London, England. The company is a UK-based (Milton Keynes, England) and US manufacturer (based in Newark, Ohio) of lighting fixtures for commercial, industrial, outdoor, and emergency applications. The company (Holophane) is noted for its glass reflector/refractor. In addition, it manufactures lenses for street lights, including General Electric, Cooper Lighting, and Lithonia Lighting. Holophane has been integral in the Illuminating Engineering Society of North America since its inception in 1906, with the first meeting being held in the headquarters.

The hallmark of Holophane luminaires, or lighting fixtures, is the borosilicate glass reflector/refractor. The glass prisms provide a combination of uplight and downlight to illuminate any environment evenly without creating dark spots or glare. This ribbed glass shade/reflector, called "Holophane" or "Holophane style/type", is used in "vintage" style lighting, and is licensed and copied throughout the lighting industry. The trademarked name for the borosilicate glass is Endural. The process they took to perfect this material involves many forms of mathematics and engineering, going all the way to advanced calculus.

In October 2008, Acuity Brands announced that it was closing the Utica, Ohio plant and scaling back its Newark, Ohio assembly operations and relocating them to Mexico and Crawfordsville, Indiana.
