= Chatham, Licking County, Ohio =

Unincorporated community in Ohio, U.S.

Coordinates: 40°09′27″N 82°27′13″W

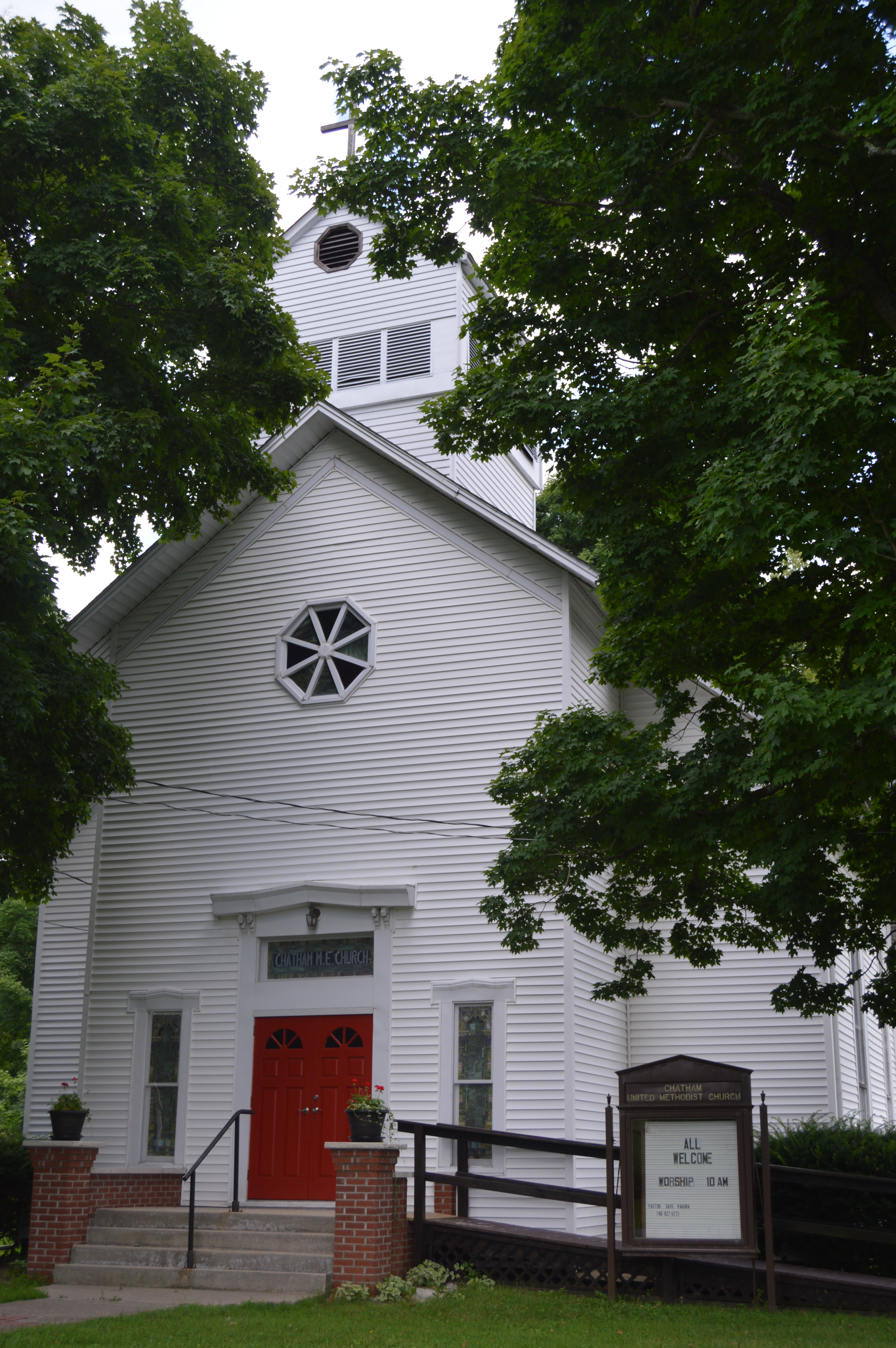
Methodist church

Chatham is an unincorporated community in Licking County, in the U.S. state of Ohio.

== History ==
Chatham was originally called Harrisburgh, and under the latter name was laid out in 1829. A post office was established under the name Chatham in 1836, and remained in operation until 1894.
