= New Way, Ohio =

Unincorporated community in Ohio, U.S.

Coordinates: 40°09′15″N 82°34′25″W

New Way is an unincorporated community in Licking County, in the U.S. state of Ohio.

== History ==
A post office was established at New Way in 1851, and remained in operation until 1902. The community took its name from the New Way Universalist church.
