= Licking Township, Licking County, Ohio =

Township in Ohio, US

- Township
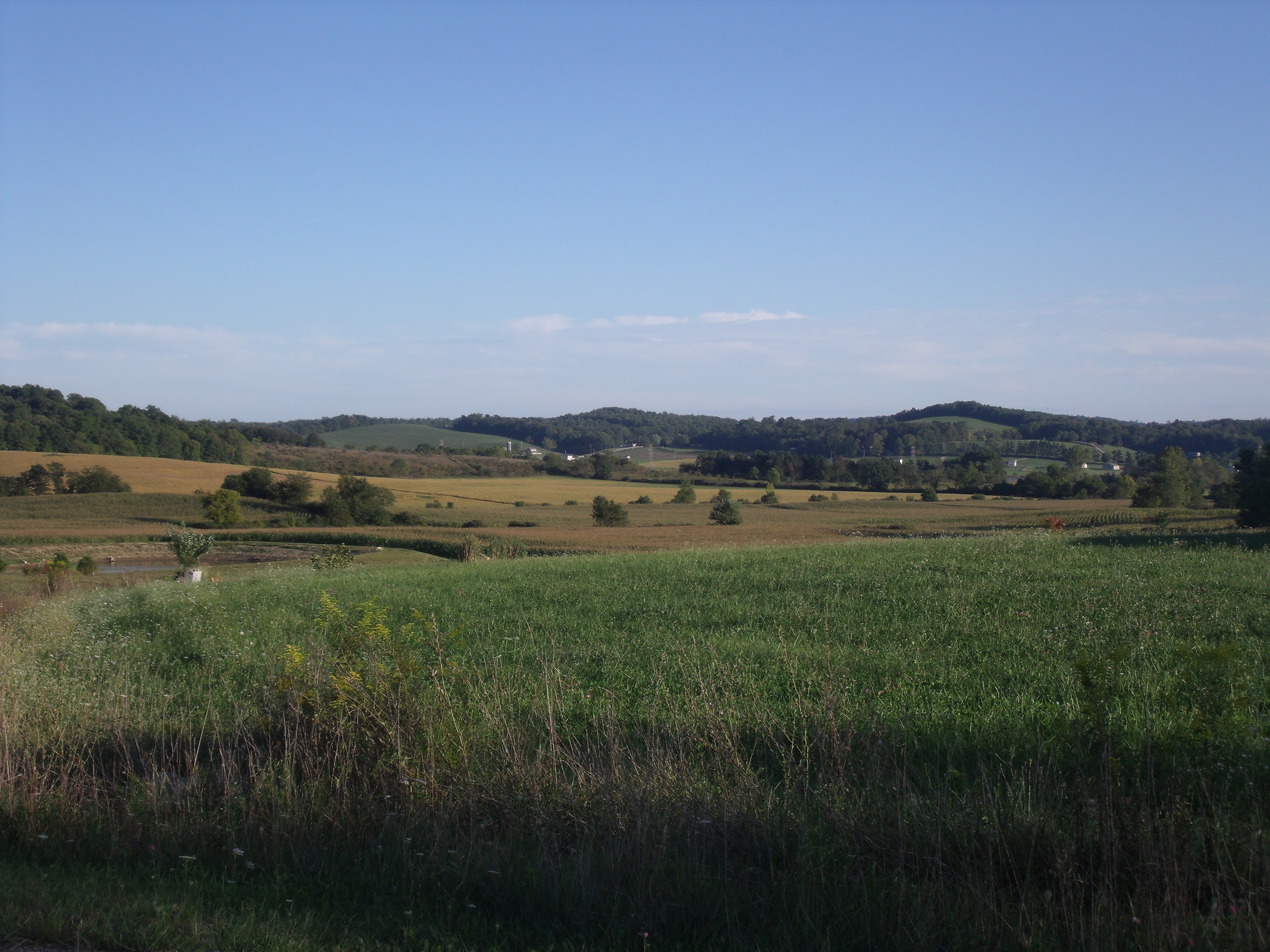
- Typical township scenery

- Location of Licking Township in Licking County
- Coordinates: 39°57′33″N 82°25′4″W
- Country: United States
- State: Ohio
- County: Licking

Area
  - Total: 27.0 sq mi (70.0 km^{2})
  - Land: 26.2 sq mi (67.8 km^{2})
  - Water: 0.85 sq mi (2.2 km^{2})
- Elevation: 955 ft (291 m)

Population (2020)
  - Total: 4,824
  - Density: 184/sq mi (71.2/km^{2})
- Time zone: UTC-5 (Eastern (EST))
  - Summer (DST): UTC-4 (EDT)
- FIPS code: 39-43456
- GNIS feature ID: 1086467
- Website: https://www.lickingtwplc.gov/

Licking Township is one of the 25 townships of Licking County, Ohio, United States. As of the 2020 census, the population was 4,824.

== Geography ==
Located on the southern edge of the county, it borders the following townships and city:

- Heath - north
- Franklin Township - east
- Bowling Green Township - southeast
- Thorn Township, Perry County - south
- Union Township - west

The census-designated place of Harbor Hills is located in the southern part of the township, and the CDP of Jacksontown lies at the center of the township.

== Name and history ==
Statewide, the only other Licking Township is located in Muskingum County.

== Government ==
The township is governed by a three-member board of trustees, who are elected in November of odd-numbered years to a four-year term beginning on the following January 1. Two are elected in the year after the presidential election and one is elected in the year before it. There is also an elected township fiscal officer, who serves a four-year term beginning on April 1 of the year after the election, which is held in November of the year before the presidential election. Vacancies in the fiscal officership or on the board of trustees are filled by the remaining trustees.
