= Newark, Ohio =

- City
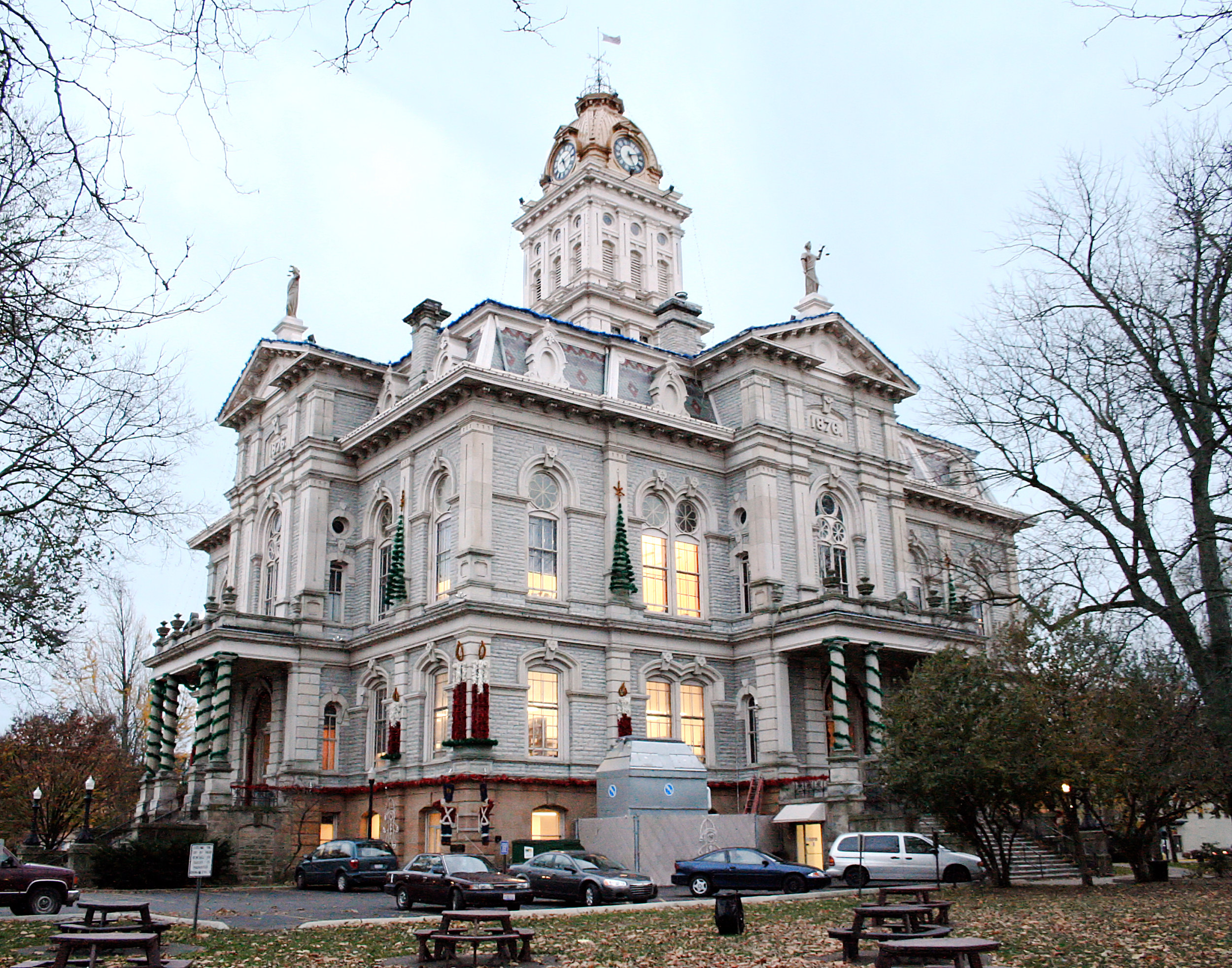
- Licking County Courthouse
- Motto: Land of Legend ⏤ Past and Future
- Interactive map of Newark, Ohio
- Location within Ohio Location within the United States
- Coordinates: 40°04′45″N 82°23′50″W
- Country: United States
- State: Ohio
- County: Licking
- Settled: 1802
- Incorporated: 1813

Government
  - Mayor: Jeff Hall (R)
  - President of Council: Jeff Harris (R)

Area
  - Total: 21.37 sq mi (55.34 km^{2})
  - Land: 20.88 sq mi (54.09 km^{2})
  - Water: 0.48 sq mi (1.25 km^{2})
- Elevation: 853 ft (260 m)

Population (2020)
  - Total: 49,934
  - Density: 2,390.9/sq mi (923.12/km^{2})
- Time zone: UTC−5 (Eastern (EST))
  - Summer (DST): UTC−4 (EDT)
- ZIP codes: 43055, 43056, 43058, 43093
- Area codes: 740, 220
- FIPS code: 39-54040
- GNIS feature ID: 1086473
- Website: www.newarkohio.gov

Newark (/ˈnjuːərk/ NEW-ərk) is a city in Licking County, Ohio, United States, and its county seat. It is located 40 miles (64 km) east of Columbus at the junction of the forks of the Licking River. The population was 49,934 at the 2020 census, making it the 18th-largest city in Ohio. It is known for having the world's largest basket, which housed the former headquarters of the now defunct Longaberger Company. The city is part of the Columbus metropolitan area.

It is the site of much of the Newark Earthworks, a major ancient complex built by the Hopewell culture. The Great Circle portion and additional burial mounds are located in the neighboring city of Heath, Ohio. This complex has been designated as a National Historic Landmark and is part of the Hopewell Ceremonial Earthworks World Heritage Site; it is operated as a state park by the Ohio History Connection.

== History ==
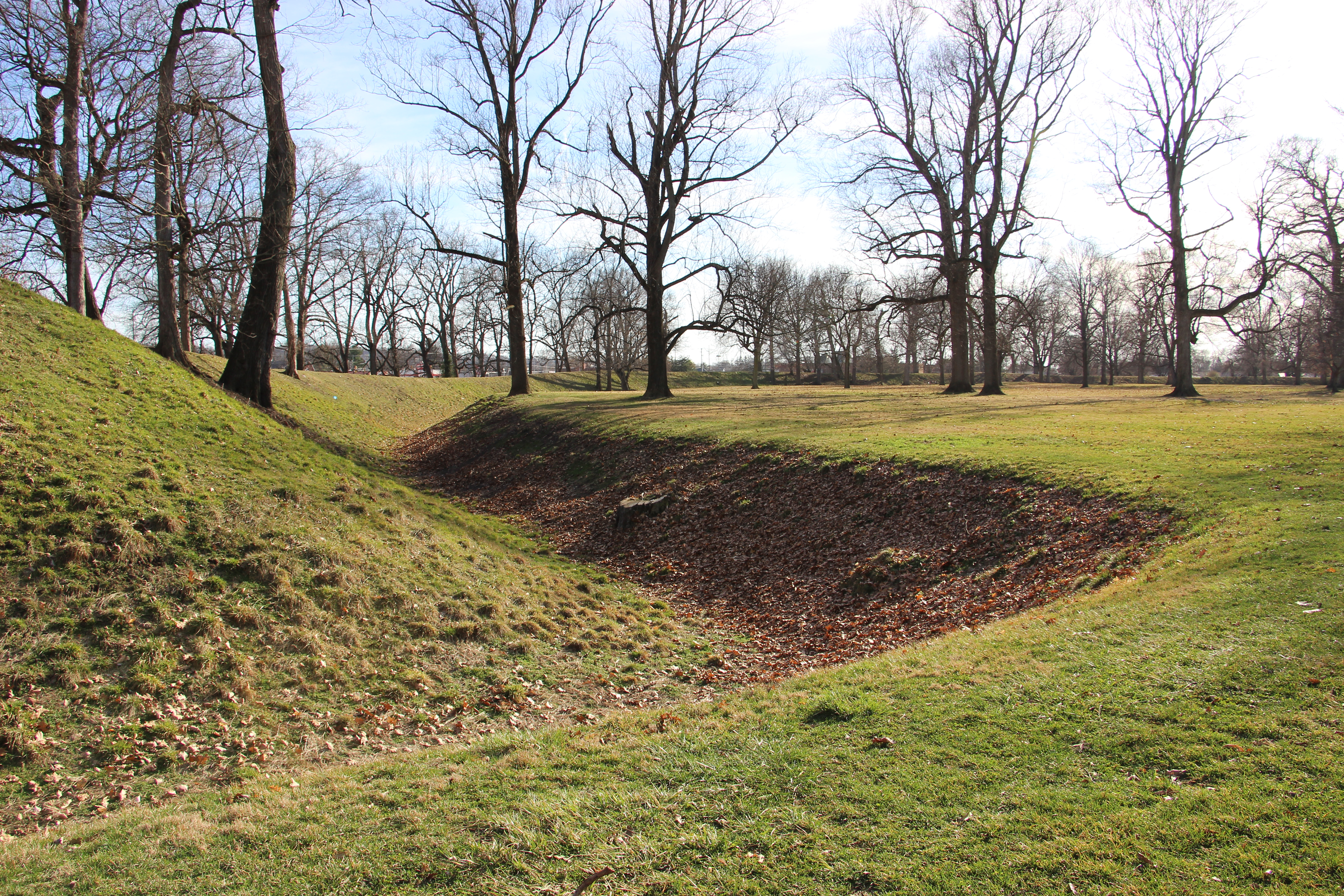
Newark Earthworks mound, Hopewell culture, 100 AD-500 AD

Cultures of indigenous peoples lived along the river valleys for thousands of years before European contact. From more than two thousand years ago, 100 AD to 500 AD, people of the Hopewell culture transformed the area of Newark and Heath. They built many earthen mounds and enclosures, creating the single largest earthwork complex in the Ohio River Valley. The Newark Earthworks, designated a National Historic Landmark, have been preserved to document and interpret the area's significant ancient history. The earthworks cover several square miles and about 206 acres. This is operated as a state park by the Ohio History Connection.

The Observatory Mound, Observatory Circle, and the interconnected Octagon earthworks span nearly 3,000 feet (910 m) in length. The Octagon alone is large enough to contain four Roman Coliseums. The Great Pyramid of Giza in Egypt would fit precisely within Observatory Circle. The even larger 1,180-foot (360 m)-diameter Newark Great Circle, located in Heath, is the largest circular earthwork in the Americas. The 8 feet (2.4 m)-high walls surround a 5 feet (1.5 m)-deep moat. At the entrance, the walls and moat are of greater and more impressive dimensions.

Contemporary archaeogeodesy and archaeoastronomy researchers have demonstrated that the Hopewell and other prehistoric cultures had advanced scientific understandings which they used to create their earthworks for astronomical observations, markings and celebrations. Researchers analyzed the placements, alignments, dimensions, and site-to-site interrelationships of the Hopewell earthworks to understand what had been done. Today, the Ohio Historical Society preserves the Great Circle Earthworks in a public park near downtown Newark, called Mound Builders Park (or the Newark Earthworks) located at 99 Cooper Ave, Newark, Ohio. The area of the Octagon Earthworks had been leased to a country club, but new arrangements in 1997 provided for more public access to it. Beginning in January 2025, the Octagon Earthworks have now been designated as a UNESCO World Heritage Site and is open to full public access. Later American Indian tribes inhabiting the area at the time of European contact were distant descendants of the Hopewell peoples.

=== European-American settlement ===
After exploration by traders and trappers in earlier centuries, the first European-American settlers arrived in 1802, led by Gen. William C. Schenck. He named the new village after his New Jersey hometown.

Nineteenth-century investment in infrastructure resulted in growth in the town after it was linked to major transportation and trade networks. On July 4, 1825, Governors Clinton of New York and Morrow of Ohio dug the first shovelfuls of dirt for the Ohio and Erie Canal project, at the Licking Summit near Newark, Ohio. On April 11, 1855, Newark became a stop along the Pittsburgh, Cincinnati, Chicago and St. Louis Railroad that was built to connect Pittsburgh to Chicago and St. Louis. On April 16, 1857, the Central Ohio Railroad connected Newark west to Columbus, and later Newark maintained a station on the Baltimore and Ohio Railroad.

The Heisey Glass Company started in Newark in 1895. The factory operated there for 62 years, until the company's demise in 1957 due to changing tastes. The National Heisey Glass Museum, operated by the Heisey Collectors of America, Inc., is located on Sixth Street in Newark.

In 1909, the Arcade was opened. Modeled after innovative European retail buildings, it became one of Newark's first successful retail emporiums. Later versions of buildings that contained a variety of shops indoors became known as shopping malls. At 60,000 square feet (5,600 m^{2}), the Arcade is one-third the size of an average modern Wal-Mart.

== Geography ==
According to the United States Census Bureau, the city has a total area of 21.37 square miles (55.35 km^{2}), of which 20.88 square miles (54.08 km^{2}) is land and 0.49 square miles (1.27 km^{2}) is water. Newark is located at 40°3′47″N 82°25′0″W (40.063014, −82.416779).

=== Climate ===
Climate data for Newark, Ohio (1991–2020 normals and extremes 1934–present)
Month	Jan	Feb	Mar	Apr	May	Jun	Jul	Aug	Sep	Oct	Nov	Dec	Year
Record high °F (°C)	76 (24)	77 (25)	85 (29)	90 (32)	95 (35)	101 (38)	106 (41)	101 (38)	103 (39)	90 (32)	81 (27)	76 (24)	106 (41)
Mean maximum °F (°C)	60.4 (15.8)	63.0 (17.2)	72.1 (22.3)	81.2 (27.3)	86.7 (30.4)	92.1 (33.4)	92.5 (33.6)	91.6 (33.1)	88.6 (31.4)	81.2 (27.3)	70.4 (21.3)	61.4 (16.3)	93.7 (34.3)
Mean daily maximum °F (°C)	36.4 (2.4)	39.6 (4.2)	49.7 (9.8)	62.8 (17.1)	72.7 (22.6)	81.1 (27.3)	84.3 (29.1)	82.8 (28.2)	76.3 (24.6)	64.4 (18.0)	51.7 (10.9)	40.7 (4.8)	61.9 (16.6)
Daily mean °F (°C)	27.3 (−2.6)	29.7 (−1.3)	38.6 (3.7)	49.9 (9.9)	60.2 (15.7)	69.1 (20.6)	72.6 (22.6)	71.0 (21.7)	63.9 (17.7)	52.2 (11.2)	41.1 (5.1)	32.2 (0.1)	50.7 (10.4)
Mean daily minimum °F (°C)	18.2 (−7.7)	19.7 (−6.8)	27.4 (−2.6)	37.1 (2.8)	47.7 (8.7)	57.1 (13.9)	60.9 (16.1)	59.1 (15.1)	51.5 (10.8)	40.0 (4.4)	30.5 (−0.8)	23.7 (−4.6)	39.4 (4.1)
Mean minimum °F (°C)	−2.1 (−18.9)	2.8 (−16.2)	12.0 (−11.1)	24.3 (−4.3)	34.8 (1.6)	44.9 (7.2)	51.5 (10.8)	49.9 (9.9)	39.3 (4.1)	28.2 (−2.1)	17.8 (−7.9)	8.1 (−13.3)	−4.7 (−20.4)
Record low °F (°C)	−24 (−31)	−26 (−32)	−7 (−22)	12 (−11)	23 (−5)	32 (0)	41 (5)	38 (3)	25 (−4)	14 (−10)	−4 (−20)	−21 (−29)	−26 (−32)
Average precipitation inches (mm)	3.21 (82)	2.56 (65)	3.61 (92)	4.01 (102)	4.24 (108)	4.69 (119)	4.56 (116)	3.89 (99)	3.24 (82)	3.11 (79)	2.99 (76)	3.29 (84)	43.40 (1,102)
Average snowfall inches (cm)	7.2 (18)	3.9 (9.9)	2.2 (5.6)	0.1 (0.25)	0.0 (0.0)	0.0 (0.0)	0.0 (0.0)	0.0 (0.0)	0.0 (0.0)	0.0 (0.0)	0.2 (0.51)	1.6 (4.1)	15.2 (39)
Average precipitation days (≥ 0.01 in)	12.7	10.4	10.8	12.5	12.8	11.3	11.4	10.3	8.8	10.1	10.2	11.8	133.1
Average snowy days (≥ 0.1 in)	3.9	3.3	1.2	0.1	0.0	0.0	0.0	0.0	0.0	0.0	0.3	1.9	10.7
Source: NOAA

== Demographics ==
Historical population
Census	Pop.	Note	%±
1810	232		—
1820	410		76.7%
1830	999		143.7%
1840	2,705		170.8%
1850	3,654		35.1%
1860	4,675		27.9%
1870	6,698		43.3%
1880	9,600		43.3%
1890	14,270		48.6%
1900	18,157		27.2%
1910	25,404		39.9%
1920	26,718		5.2%
1930	30,596		14.5%
1940	31,487		2.9%
1950	34,275		8.9%
1960	41,790		21.9%
1970	41,836		0.1%
1980	41,162		−1.6%
1990	44,389		7.8%
2000	46,279		4.3%
2010	47,573		2.8%
2020	49,934		5.0%

In terms of population, Newark, Ohio is the second-largest Newark in the United States, after Newark, New Jersey. Newark, Ohio is part of the Columbus, Ohio metropolitan area. The median income for a household in the city was $52,570, with 16.8% of the population below the poverty line.

=== 2020 census ===
As of the 2020 census, Newark had a population of 49,934. The median age was 38.6 years. 22.8% of residents were under the age of 18 and 17.7% of residents were 65 years of age or older. For every 100 females there were 93.5 males, and for every 100 females age 18 and over there were 90.5 males age 18 and over.

99.2% of residents lived in urban areas, while 0.8% lived in rural areas.

There were 20,817 households in Newark, of which 27.8% had children under the age of 18 living in them. Of all households, 37.6% were married-couple households, 20.6% were households with a male householder and no spouse or partner present, and 31.8% were households with a female householder and no spouse or partner present. About 33.2% of all households were made up of individuals and 13.9% had someone living alone who was 65 years of age or older.

There were 22,351 housing units, of which 6.9% were vacant. The homeowner vacancy rate was 1.7% and the rental vacancy rate was 6.3%.

Racial composition as of the 2020 census
Race	Number	Percent
White	44,198	88.5%
Black or African American	1,691	3.4%
American Indian and Alaska Native	133	0.3%
Asian	372	0.7%
Native Hawaiian and Other Pacific Islander	14	0.0%
Some other race	386	0.8%
Two or more races	3,140	6.3%
Hispanic or Latino (of any race)	1,001	2.0%

=== 2010 census ===
As of the 2010 census, there were 47,573 people, 19,840 households, and 12,057 families residing in the city. The population density was 2,278.4 inhabitants per square mile (879.7/km^{2}). There were 21,976 housing units at an average density of 1,052.5 per square mile (406.4/km^{2}). The racial makeup of the city was 92.8% White, 3.3% African American, 0.3% Native American, 0.6% Asian, 0.3% from other races, and 2.6% from two or more races. Hispanic or Latino people of any race were 1.2% of the population.

There were 19,840 households, of which 30.8% had children under the age of 18 living with them, 40.7% were married couples living together, 14.8% had a female householder with no husband present, 5.3% had a male householder with no wife present, and 39.2% were non-families. 31.9% of all households were made up of individuals, and 12.3% had someone living alone who was 65 years of age or older. The average household size was 2.35 and the average family size was 2.94.

The median age in the city was 37.3 years. Twenty-four percent of residents were under the age of 18; 9.9% were between the ages of 18 and 24; 25.6% were from 25 to 44; 26% were from 45 to 64; and 14.5% were 65 years of age or older. The gender makeup of the city was 47.8% male and 52.2% female.

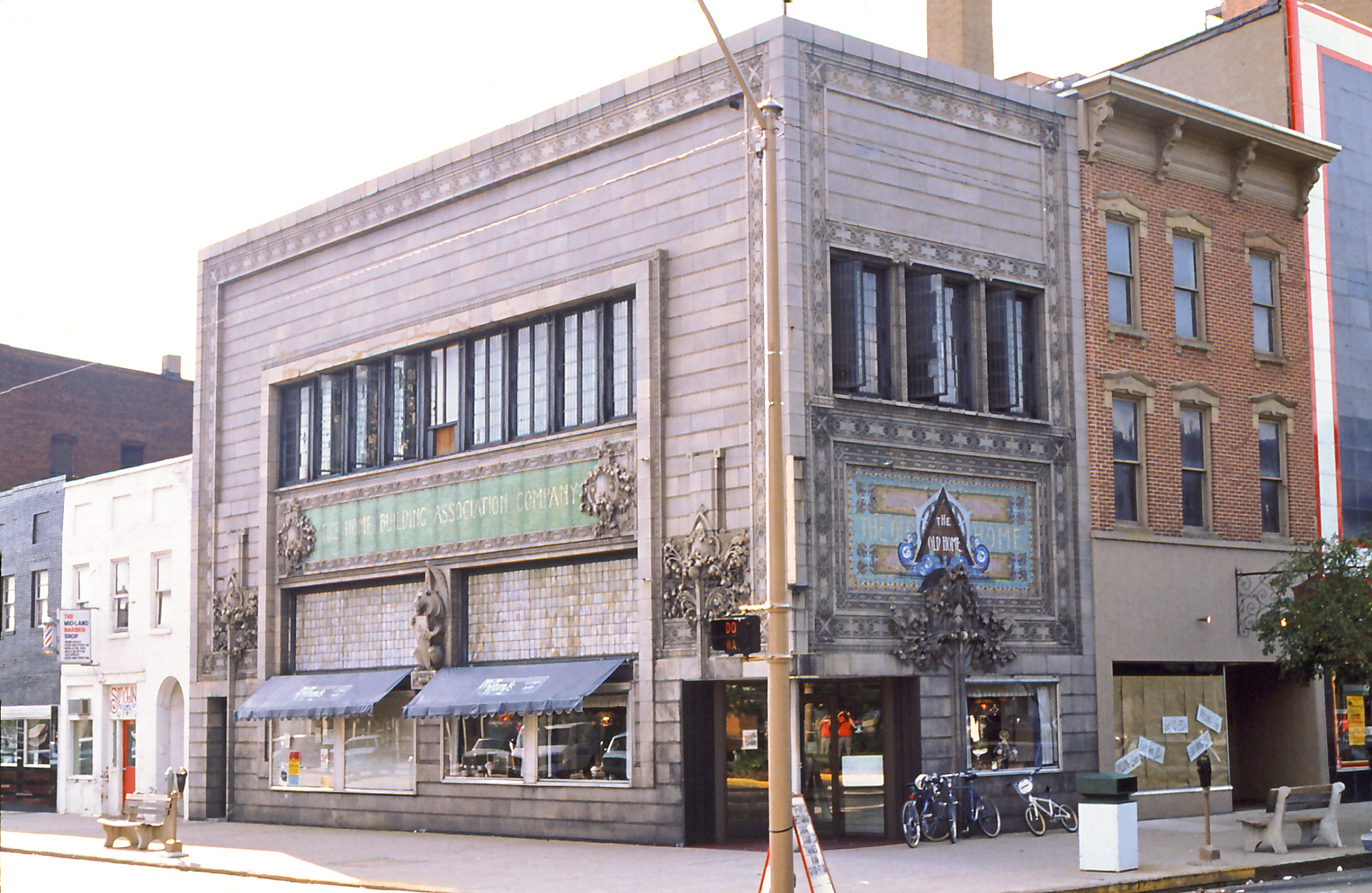
Home Building Association Bank, Louis Sullivan, architect

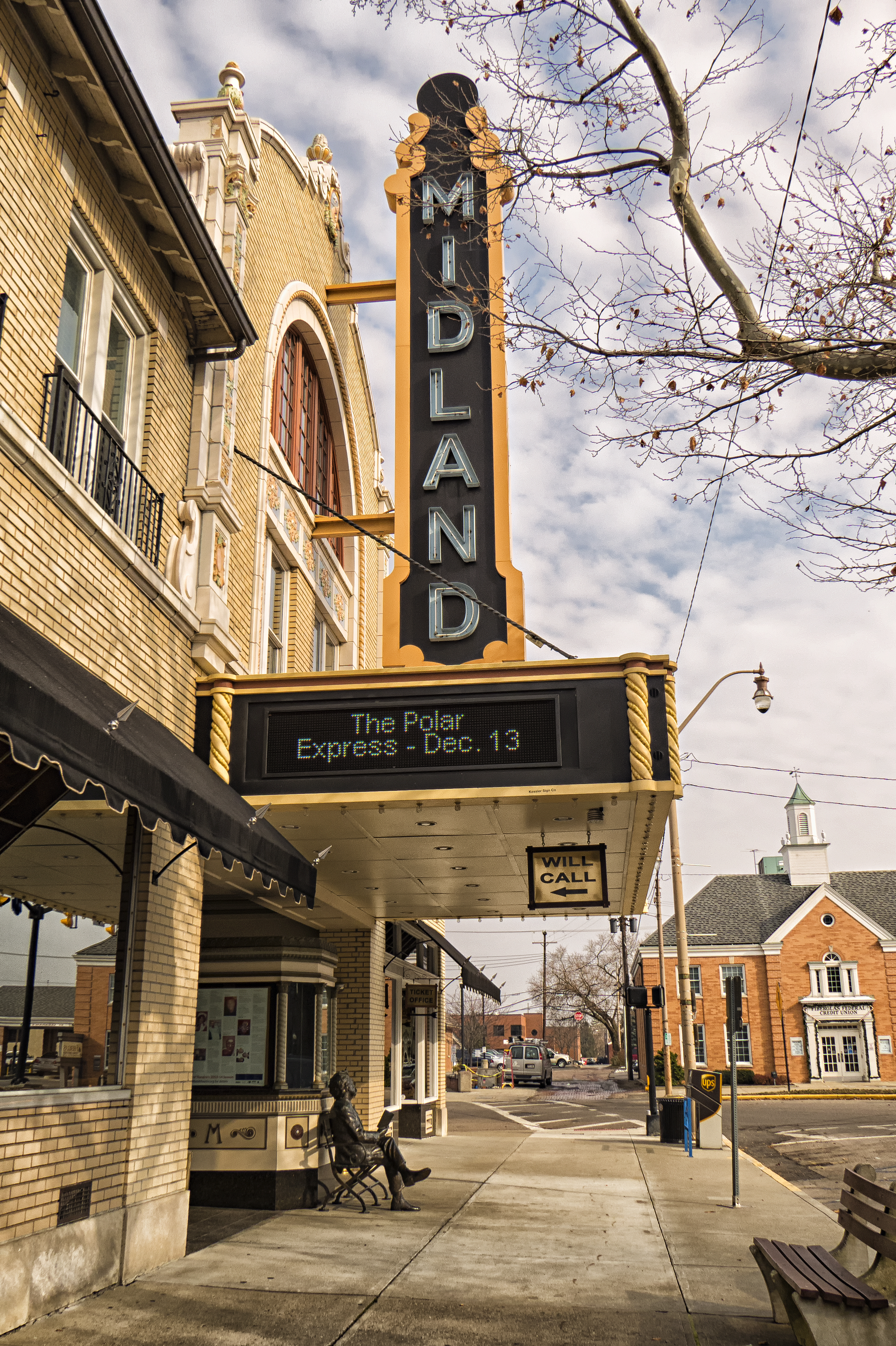
The Midland Theatre on Courthouse Square

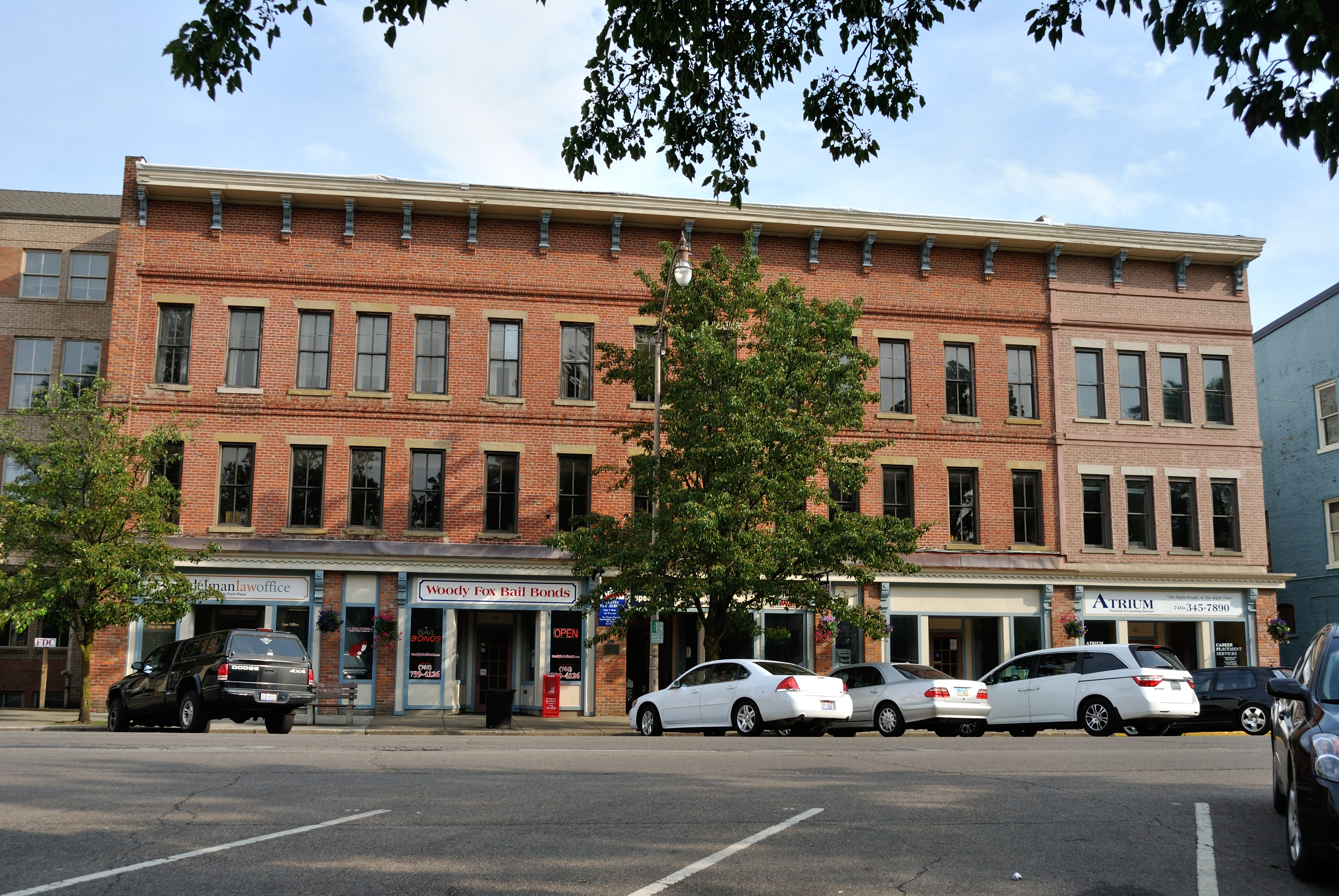
Shields Block

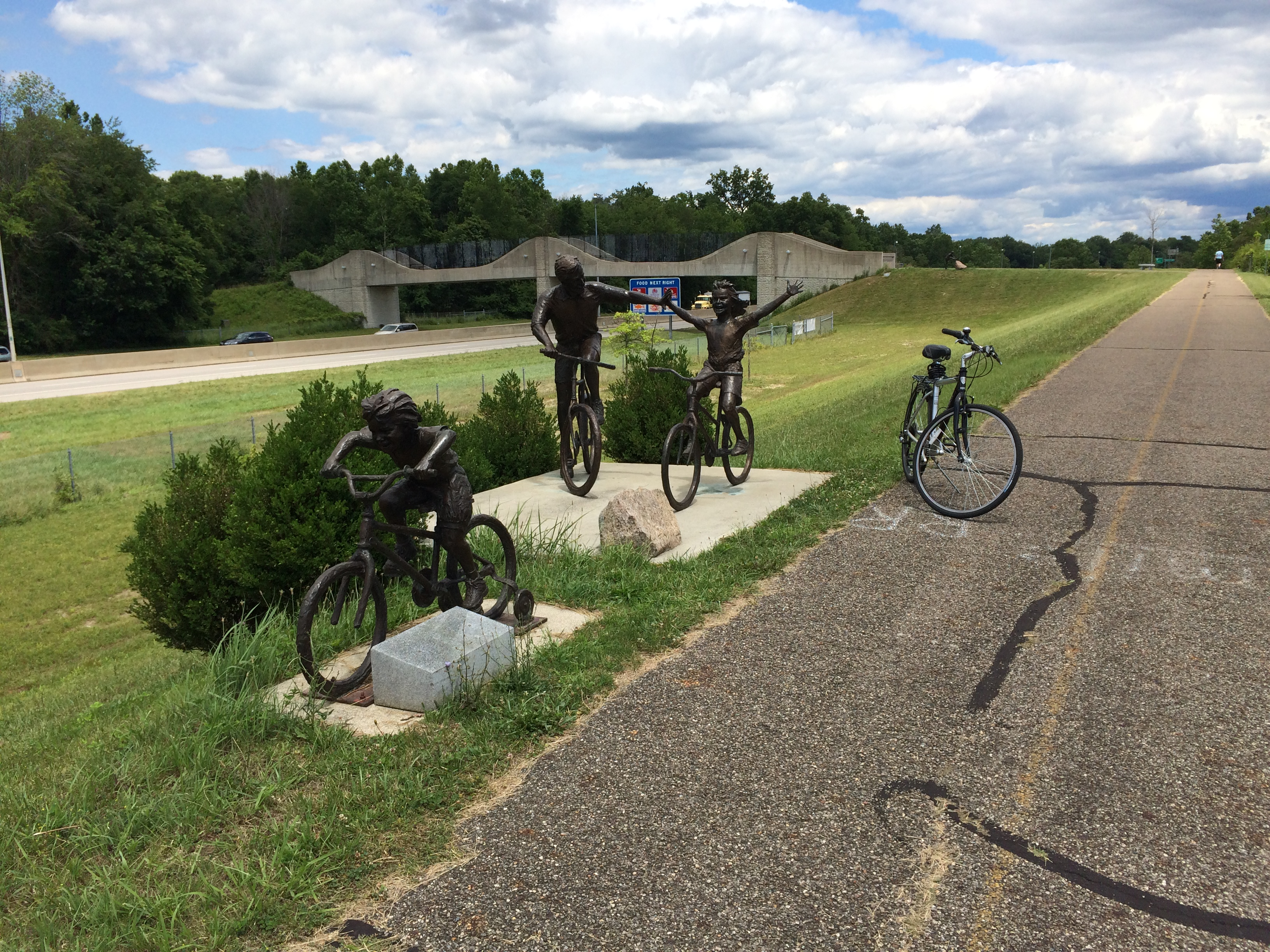
Family Outing, sculpture by Gary Lee Price, Thomas Evans Bike Trail, west of downtown

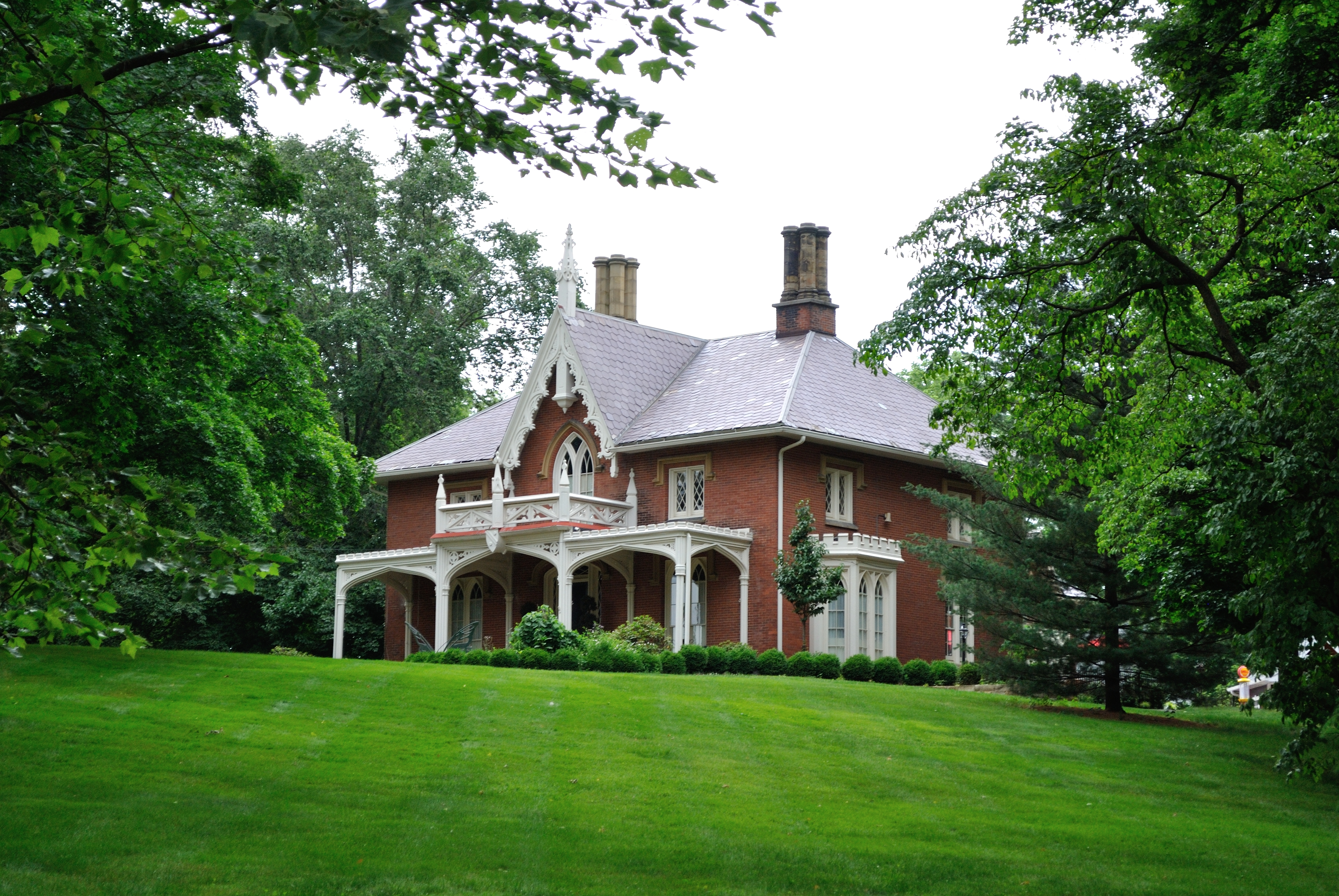
Upham-Wright House

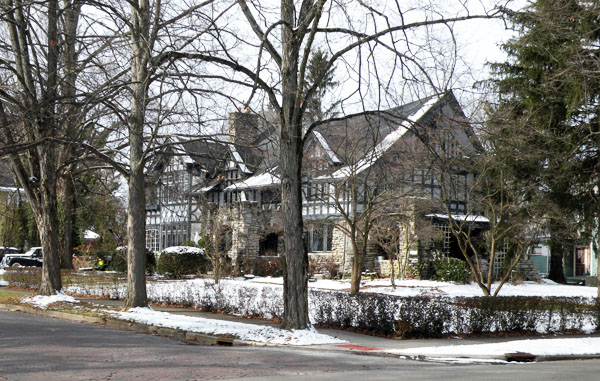
Home in the Hudson Avenue Historic District

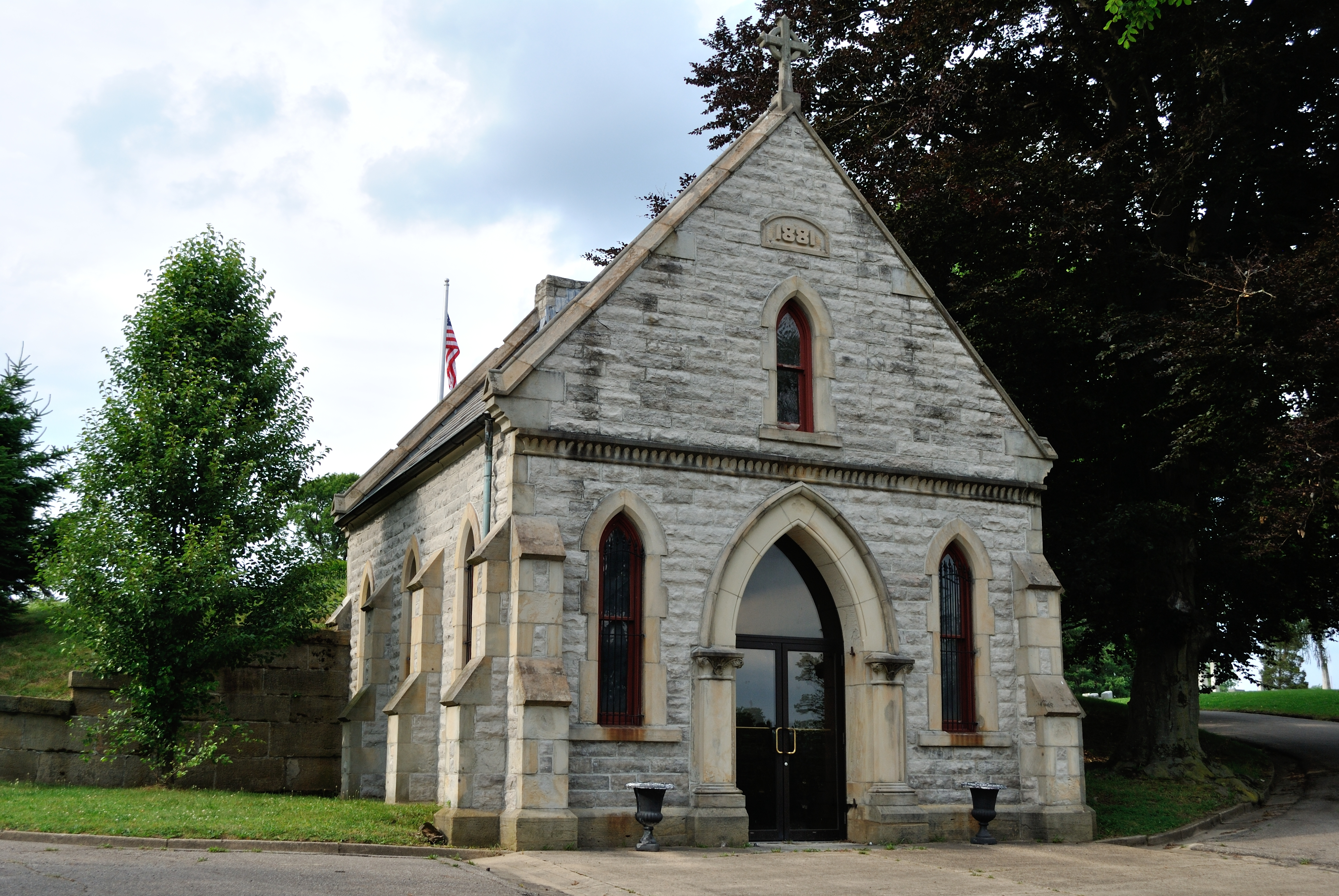
Cedar Hill Cemetery

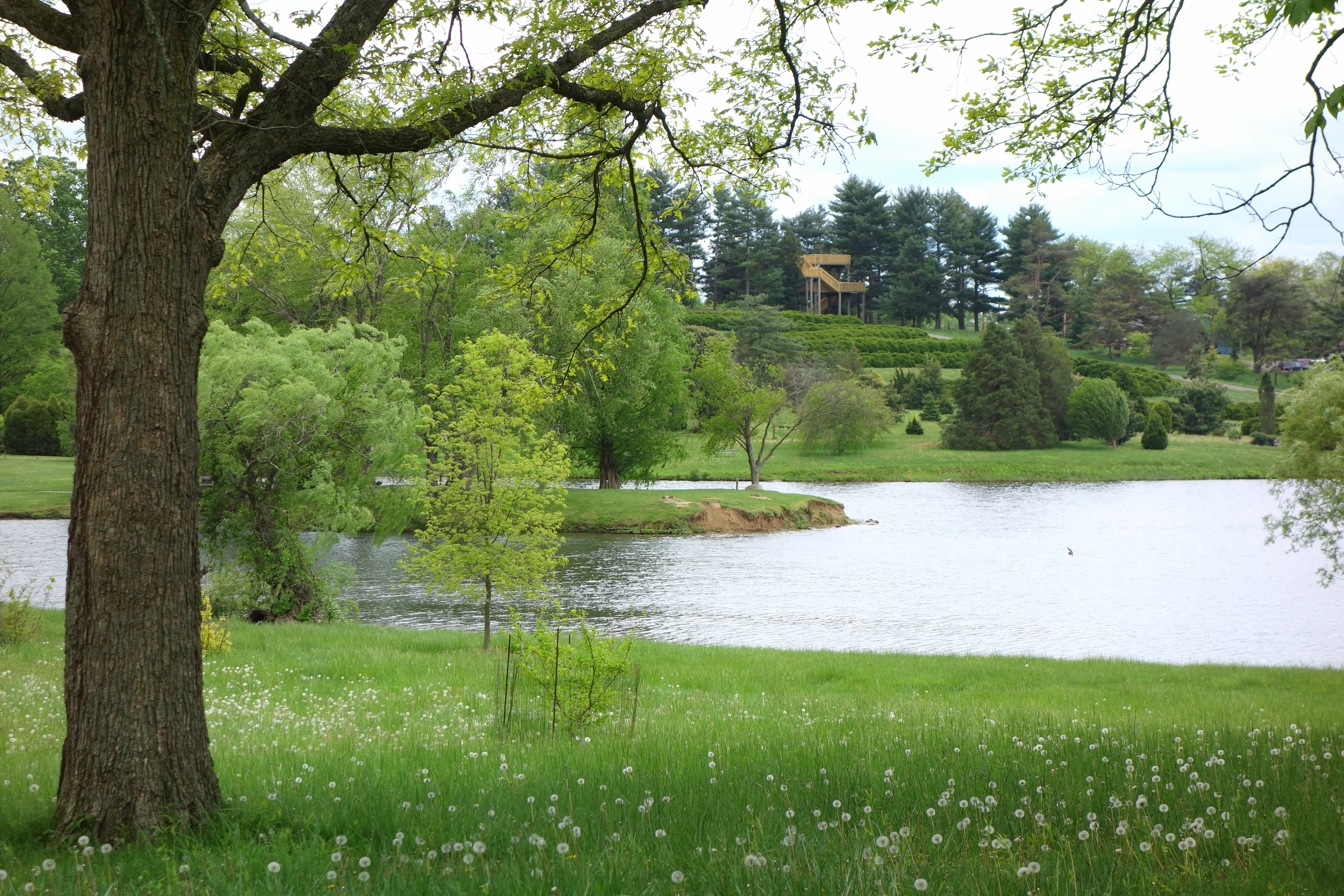
Nearby Dawes Arboretum south of Newark

== Economy ==
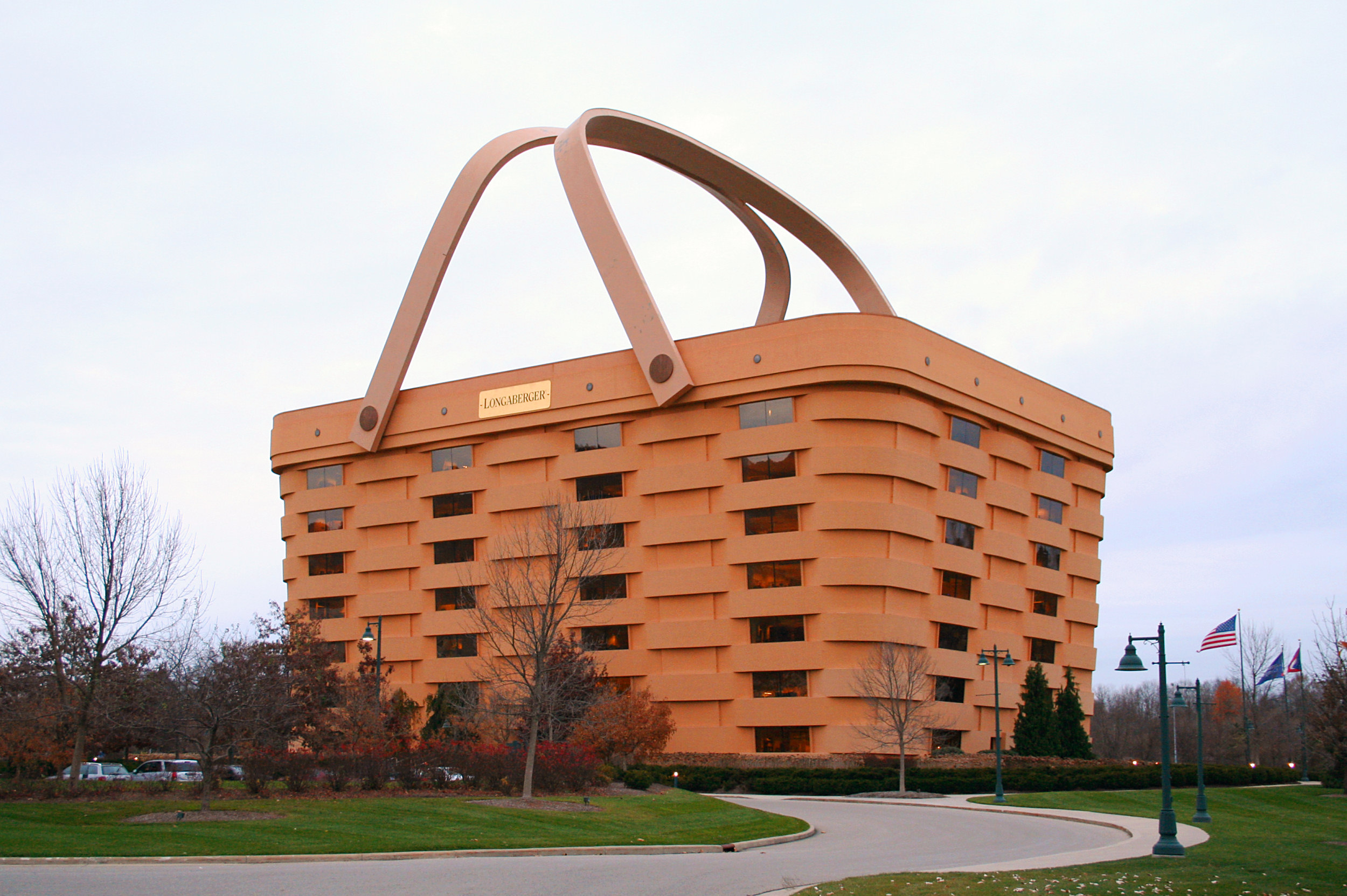
The Longaberger Company former corporate headquarters

Newark is the site of several major manufacturers. Holophane, founded in 1898, is one of the world's oldest manufacturers of lighting-related products. The main factory of Owens Corning Fiberglas is also located in Newark. State Farm Insurance had Regional Headquarters here. The Park National Bank Corporation is headquartered in downtown Newark.

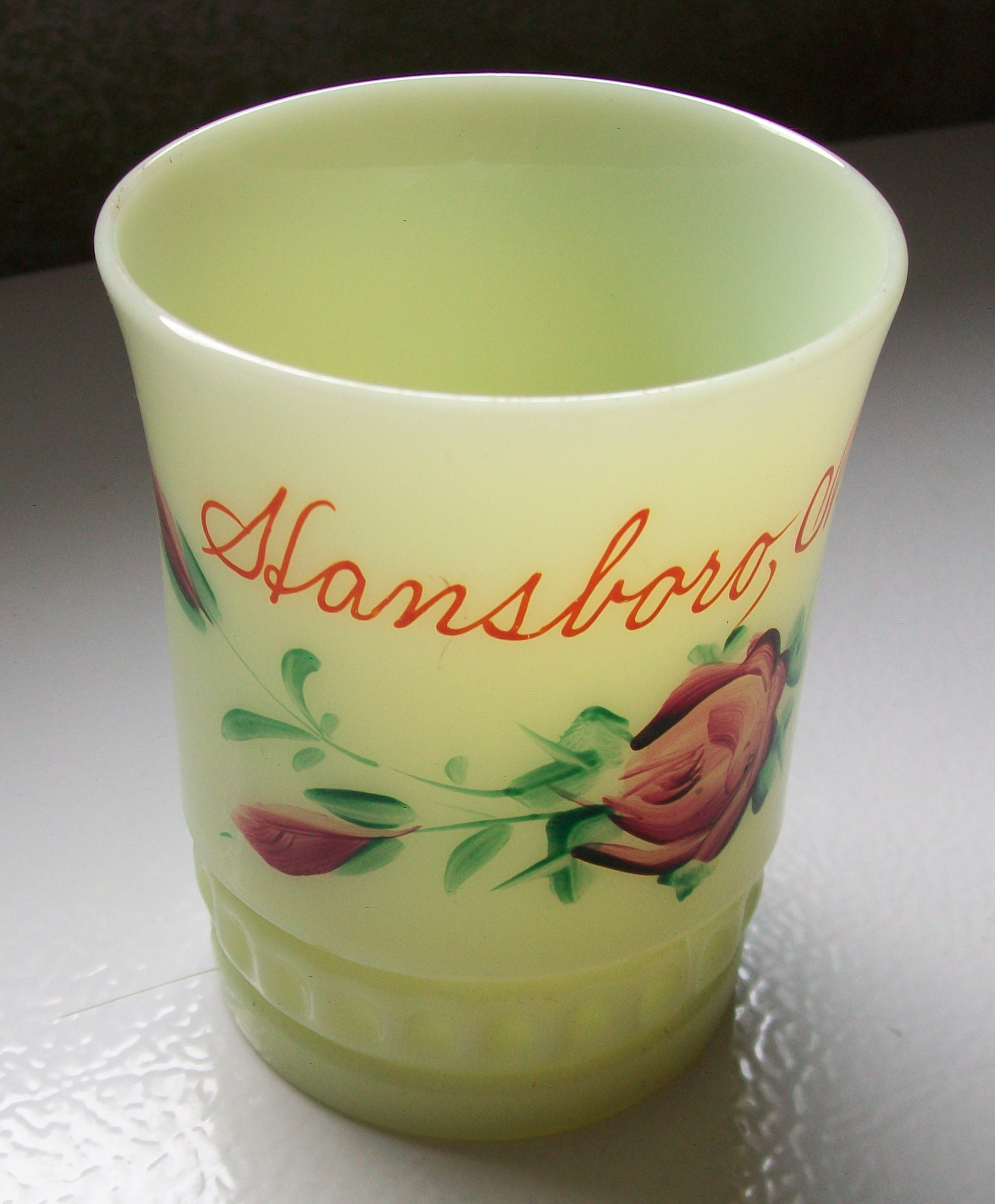
Heisey Uranium Milk Glass made in Newark

Several industrial parks have been developed and house such major companies as Kaiser Aluminum, Dow Chemical Company, General Electric, Covestro, Boeing, THK, Harry & David, Communicolor, Diebold, Anomatic, International Paper, and Tamarack Farms Dairy. For example, in 1997, basket-making company Longaberger opened their corporate headquarters in Newark which was designed as a giant "medium market basket," the favorite model of founder Dave Longaberger.

The main shopping center in the area is the Indian Mound Mall, located in nearby Heath. The mall is named for the internationally known, ancient complex called the Newark Earthworks, built 2,000 years ago by the Hopewell culture of central Ohio. It is a National Historic Landmark and major elements of the earthworks are located less than a mile away from the shopping mall named for them.

== Education ==
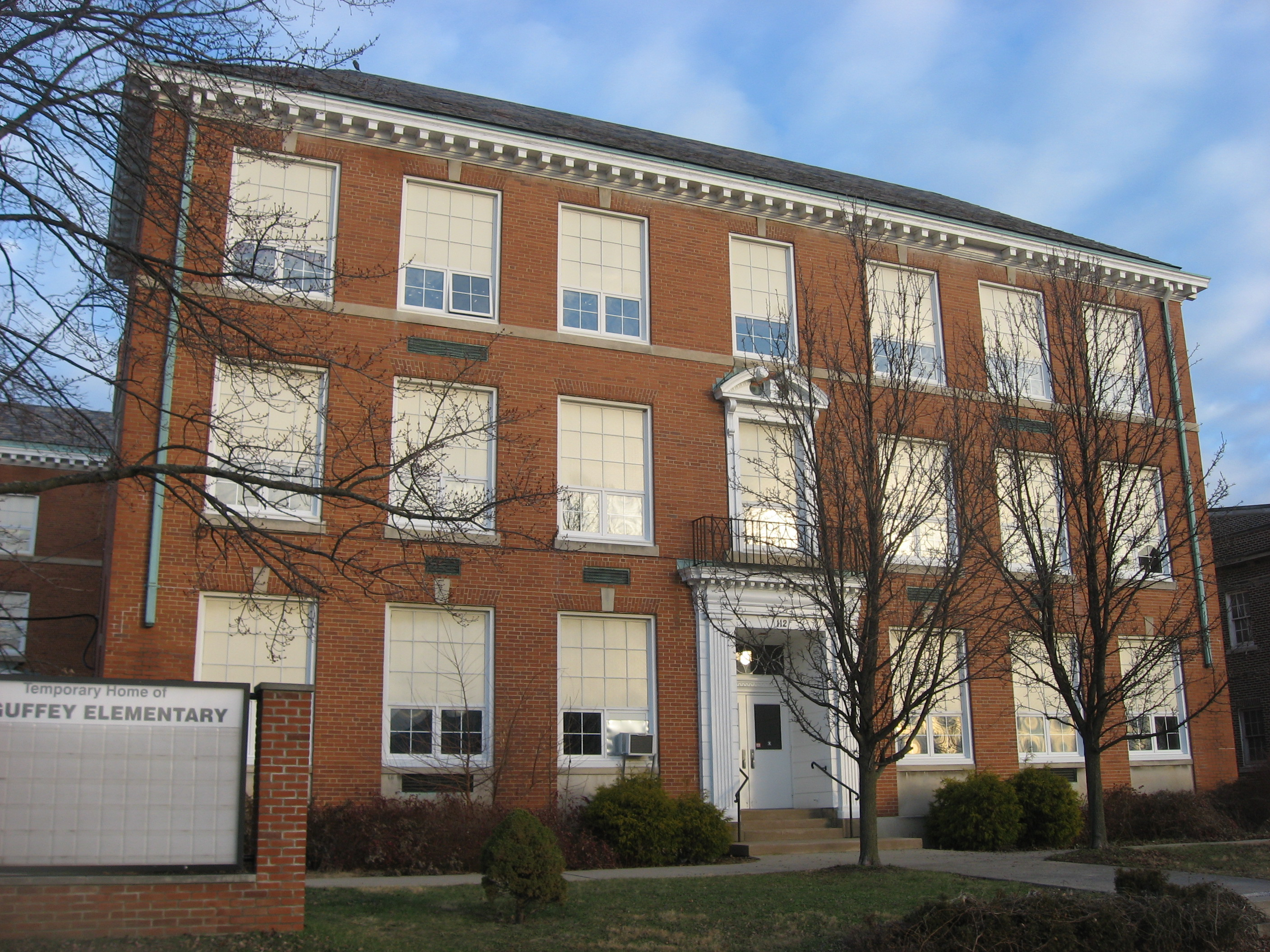
Former Central Elementary School, used also as West Main Intermediate

Newark City School District serves the city of Newark. Newark High School's enrollment is approximately 1,400 students, and it competes at the OHSAA D1 level. Newark High School has a storied tradition in academics and sports, as well as performing arts. Newark High School has won four OHSAA basketball titles (1936, 1938, 1943, 2008) and 3 AP football titles. The Pride of Newark Marching Band has made an unprecedented 42 consecutive years to the OMEA state finals. The Pride has earned a superior rating at State Marching Band finals in 31 years, including four straight seasons (2015, 2016, 2017, 2018). The Newark High School Sinfonia, under the direction of Susan Larson, tied for first runner-up at the National Orchestra Cup in New York City on April 5, 2009. The Sinfonia was featured in a front-page article of the April 14, 2009, edition of The New York Times, and received an invitation to the White House in the fall of 2009.

A regional campus of Ohio State University is also located in the city. The Ohio State University at Newark, founded in 1957, enrolls over 2,800 students and is the most diverse campus in the Ohio State system. Today, the campus features eleven buildings, including a recreation center and two residence halls. It offers Associate of Arts degrees, as well as Bachelor of Arts degrees in seven majors and master's degrees in education and social work. It also serves as a doorway to over 200 majors on the Ohio State University campus in Columbus. The Newark Campus shares its facilities with a two-year technical college, COTC (Central Ohio Technical College). It serves some 3,000 other students in 45 certificate and associate degree programs.

Newark is also home to a number of private religious schools, including St. Francis de Sales School, Blessed Sacrament School and Newark Catholic High School.

C-TEC (Career and Technology Education Centers of Licking County) offers high school and adult programs.

There are two public library branches in Newark. They are a part of the Licking County Library System.

== Infrastructure ==
=== Transportation ===
The Licking County Regional Airport is located three nautical miles (3.5 mi; 5.6 km) southwest of Newark's central business district.

Licking County Transit provides demand-response and deviated fixed route transit service in the region. GoBus' Columbus-Wooster route provides service to Newark.

== Notable people ==
- Roman Atwood, Youtube personality
- Gary A. Braunbeck, horror author
- John J. Brice, United States Navy officer and United States Commissioner of Fish and Fisheries (1896–1898)
- John Clem, one of the youngest soldiers in United States Army
- Mike Collins, football player for NFL's Detroit Lions and St. Louis Rams
- Katharine Coman, economic historian, professor at Wellesley College; credited with developing the field of industrial history
- Virgil Effinger, leader of the Black Legion and renegage Ku Klux Klan member
- Woody English, MLB player for Chicago Cubs
- John Getreu, serial killer
- Jon Hendricks, jazz singer
- Derek Holland, MLB starting pitcher for San Francisco Giants, Chicago White Sox, Texas Rangers, Detroit Tigers
- Rob Kelly, five-year NFL pro with the New Orleans Saints and New England Patriots
- Roman Mars, host and producer of 99% Invisible
- Andy Merrill, the voice of Brak
- Jerrie Mock, first woman to fly solo around the world
- Henrietta G. Moore, Universalist minister, educator, temperance activist, suffragist
- Bruce Mozert, photographer
- Wayne Newton, singer, actor, Las Vegas Strip entertainer; raised in Newark
- Kathi Norris, writer and television presenter
- Henry Putnam, Wisconsin state senator
- Dick Raymond, urban planner, entrepreneur, publisher, organizer
- Edward James Roye, 5th president of Liberia
- Fred Schaus, Hall of Fame head coach of NBA's Los Angeles Lakers, Purdue and West Virginia
- Marshall Sprague, journalist
- William Stanbery, U.S. congressman
- G. David Thompson, investment banker, industrialist, and modern art collector
- Jim Tyrer, professional football player for Kansas City Chiefs and Washington Redskins
- Jeff Uhlenhake, 12-year NFL pro with Miami Dolphins, Washington Redskins and New Orleans Saints
- Geoffrey C. Ward, historian and writer
- Clarence Hudson White, early photographer, member of modernist "Photo Secessionist" group
- Michael Z. Williamson, science fiction author
- Charles R. Woods, Civil War general
- William Burnham Woods, U.S. Supreme Court associate justice

== See also ==
- Blackhand Gorge State Nature Preserve
- Dawes Arboretum
- Home Building Association Bank
- Flint Ridge State Memorial
- Roper (company)

== Bibliography ==
- Smucker, Isaac (1807–1894): Recollections of Newark, Ohio Archæological and Historical Society Publications: Volume 20 [1911], pp. 240–247.
