= Ohio's 9th House of Representatives district =

American legislative district

Ohio's 9th State House of Representatives district
Representative
Munira Abdullahi; D–Columbus
- Population (2020): 117,175

Ohio's 9th House of Representatives district is currently represented by Democrat Munira Abdullahi. It is located entirely within Franklin County and includes the village of Minerva Park and parts of Columbus, as well as parts of Blendon and Sharon Townships.

== List of members representing the district ==
Member	Party	Years	General Assembly	Electoral history
District established January 2, 1967.
Charles E. Fry (Springfield)	Republican	January 2, 1967 – December 31, 1972	107th 108th 109th	Elected in 1966. Re-elected in 1968. Re-elected in 1970. Redistricted to the 75th district.
Troy Lee James (Cleveland)	Democratic	January 1, 1973 – December 31, 1982	110th 111th 112th 113th 114th	Redistricted from the 46th district and re-elected in 1972. Re-elected in 1974. Re-elected in 1976. Re-elected in 1978. Re-elected in 1980. Redistricted to the 12th district.
Patrick Sweeney (Cleveland)	Democratic	Jan 3, 1983 – December 31, 1992	115th 116th 117th 118th 119th	Redistricted from the 6th district and re-elected in 1982. Re-elected in 1984. Re-elected in 1986. Re-elected in 1988. Re-elected in 1990. Redistricted to the 19th district.
Barbara Boyd (Cleveland Heights)	Democratic	January 4, 1993 – December 31, 1998	120th 121st 122nd 123rd	Elected in 1992. Re-elected in 1994. Re-elected in 1996. Re-elected in 1998. Term-limited.
Claudette Woodard (Cleveland)	Democratic	January 1, 2001 – December 31, 2006	124th 125th 126th	Elected in 2000. Re-elected in 2002. Re-elected in 2004. Retired.
Barbara Boyd (Cleveland Heights)	Democratic	January 1, 2007 – December 31, 2014	127th 128th 129th 130th	Elected in 2006. Re-elected in 2008. Re-elected in 2010. Re-elected in 2012. Term-limited.
Janine Boyd (Cleveland Heights)	Democratic	January 5, 2015 – April 22, 2022	131st 132nd 133rd 134th	Elected in 2014. Re-elected in 2016. Re-elected in 2018. Re-elected in 2020. Resigned to become Regional Director of the U.S. Department of Health and Human Services.
Vacant		April 22, 2022 – May 18, 2022	134th	
Bishara Addison (Cleveland)	Democratic	May 18, 2022 – December 31, 2022	134th	Appointed to finish Boyd's term. Retired.
Munira Abdullahi (Columbus)	Democratic	January 2, 2023 – present	135th	Elected in 2022.
