= Raccoon Town, Ohio =

Ghost town in Ohio, United States

Coordinates: 40.181°N 82.742°W

Raccoon Town is a ghost town in Monroe Township, Licking County, in the U.S. state of Ohio.

== History ==
Raccoon Town was settled by Euro-American settlers in 1807 at the site of a former Wyandot village. The town took its name from nearby Raccoon Creek.
