= Hartford Township, Ohio =

Hartford Township, Ohio, may refer to:

- Hartford Township, Licking County, Ohio
- Hartford Township, Trumbull County, Ohio
