= Genoa Township, Delaware County, Ohio =

Township in Ohio, US

- Township
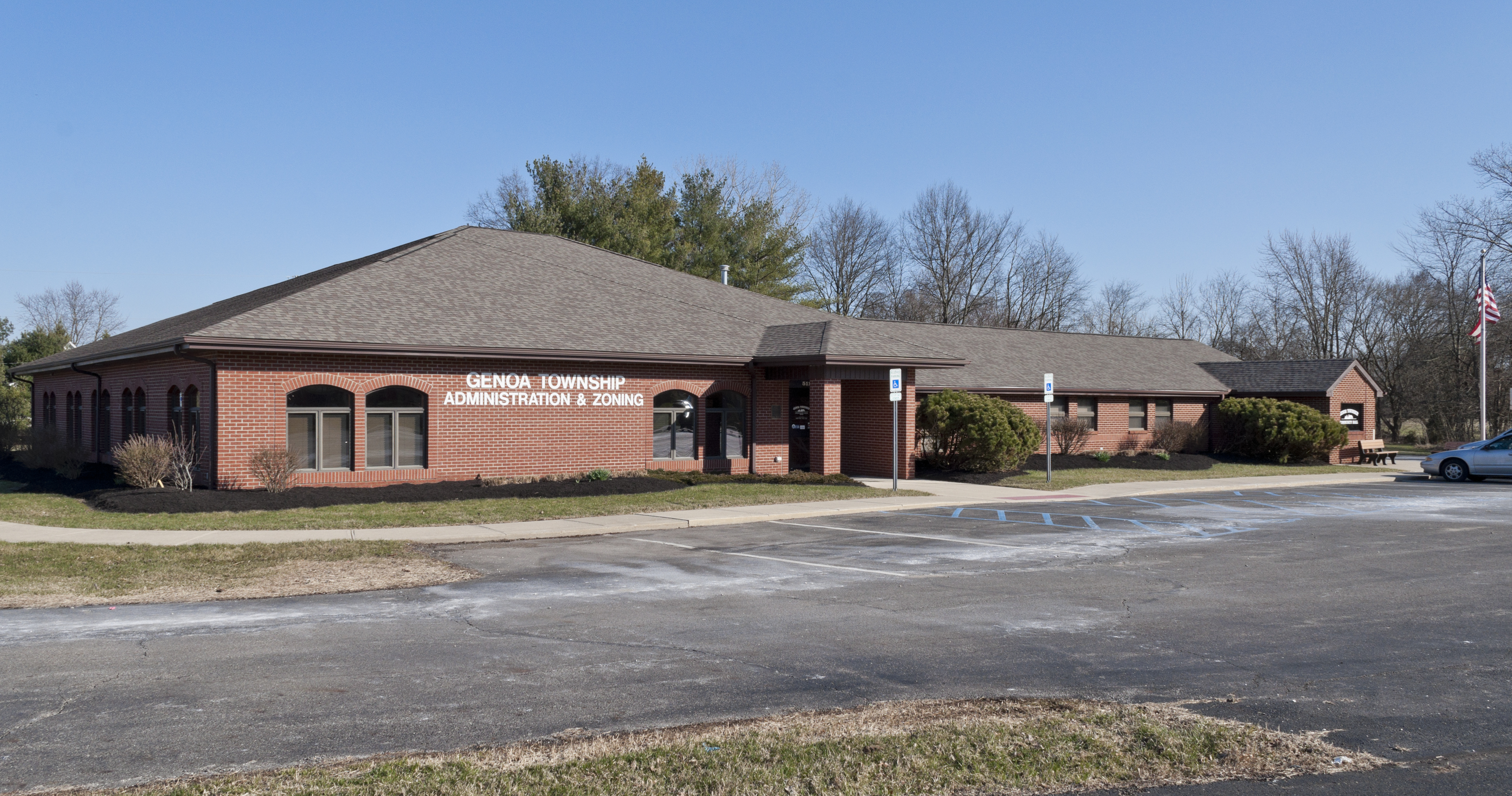
- Genoa Township Administration Building
- Motto: A Nice Place to Live
- Location of Genoa Township in Delaware County
- Coordinates: 40°10′4″N 82°54′26″W
- Country: United States
- State: Ohio
- County: Delaware

Area
  - Total: 21.5 sq mi (55.6 km^{2})
  - Land: 17.6 sq mi (45.7 km^{2})
  - Water: 3.8 sq mi (9.9 km^{2})
- Elevation: 928 ft (283 m)

Population (2020)
  - Total: 24,806
  - Density: 1,410/sq mi (543/km^{2})
- Time zone: UTC-5 (Eastern (EST))
  - Summer (DST): UTC-4 (EDT)
- FIPS code: 39-29694
- GNIS feature ID: 1086047
- Website: www.genoatwp.com

Genoa Township is one of the eighteen townships of Delaware County, Ohio, United States. The 2020 census found 24,806 people in the township.

== History ==
A variety of indigenous peoples inhabited Ohio for centuries, among them the Adena and Hopewell cultures. After their decline, others moved in. The French colonials found in central Ohio a variety of nations, including Delaware, Miami, Mingo, Ottawa, Shawnee, and Wyandot. The latter were among the last to remain until forced out in 1843.

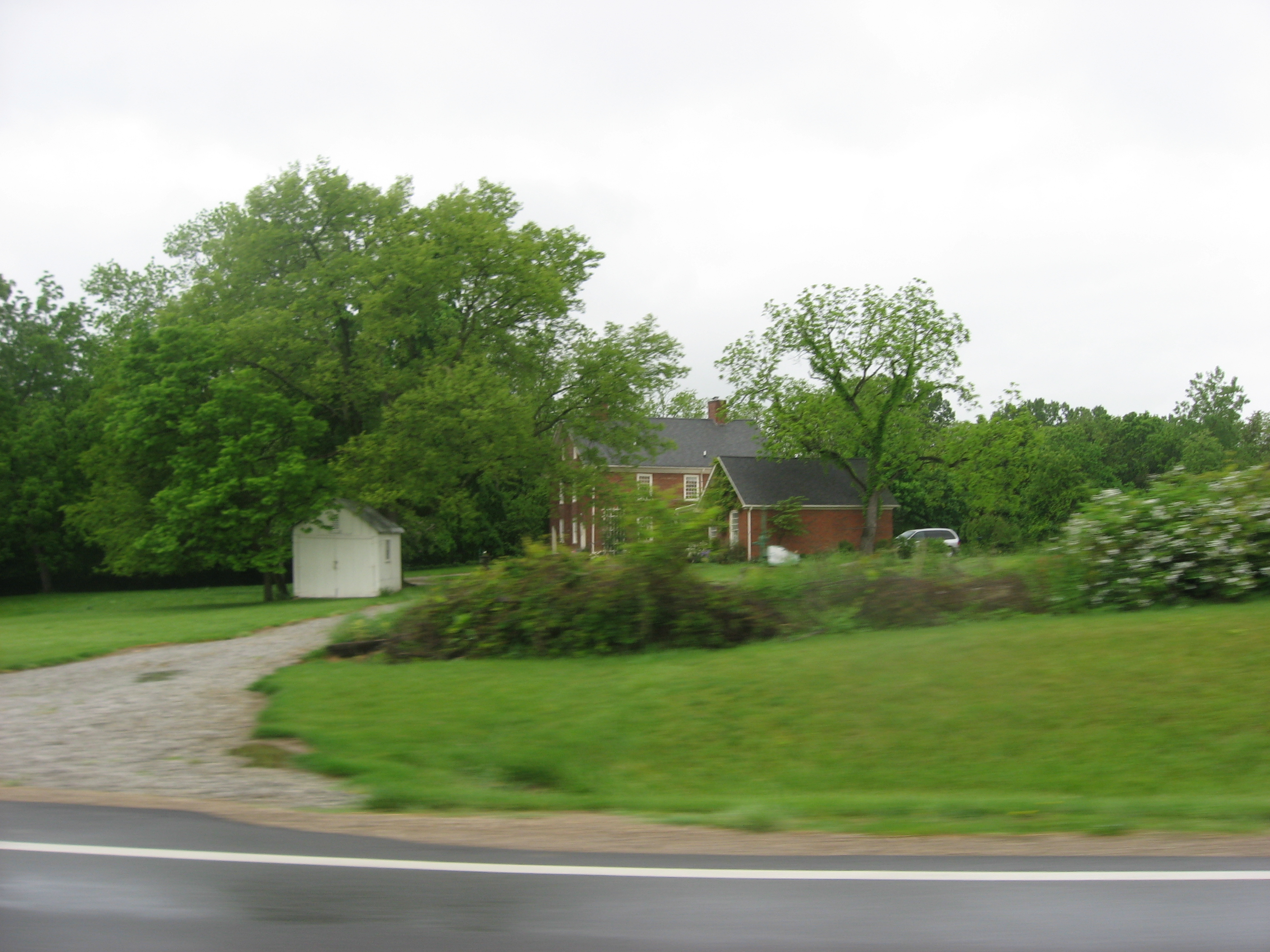
The Marcus Curtis Inn, constructed in 1822, was placed on the National Register in 1976.

The first European settlement of Genoa Township occurred adjacent to the eastern banks of Big Walnut Creek, which had been named by early settlers for the dense growth of black walnut trees, which grew along it. Due to the fact that much of the land was covered with dense forests, waterways such as Big Walnut Creek were a primary source of identification and transportation. In 1806, Jeremiah Curtiss of Connecticut became the first non-indigenous settler. He built a sawmill, a gristmill and a still along the bank of Big Walnut Creek. Though he moved to Marietta in 1811, his son, John Curtiss, returned to the township following the death of his father on June 21, 1813. Jeremiah's brother, Marcus, arrived in 1808 and around 1812 established the Marcus Curtiss Inn. The original inn was a log structure, but by 1822 a brick inn had been constructed. This structure still stands on Sunbury Road and is now a private residence. Both Jeremiah and Marcus are buried in Copeland Cemetery located on Yankee Street, adjacent to the eastern banks of Hoover Reservoir.

The Township was officially established in 1816, having been sectioned off from neighboring Harlem Township. The Township was named after Genoa, Italy, the birthplace of explorer Christopher Columbus, having been suggested by an early settler of the Township named Elisha Bennett. Unlike its namesake, the Township's name is pronounced with the stress on the second syllable, as ge-NO-a, although both pronunciations are used. Genoa Township is the only township named as such statewide. However, there is a village of Genoa located in Ottawa County, Ohio.

A relatively large portion of the Township is consumed by the Hoover Reservoir which provides drinking water to the City of Columbus. The reservoir was constructed by damming Big Walnut Creek between Smothers Road and Central College Road and flooding the surrounding low lands. Construction began in 1953. While a dedication was held in 1955, the official opening did not occur until 1958. Numerous roads were re-routed or severed in order to construct the reservoir, including; Maxtown Road, Sunbury Road, Big Walnut Road, Oxbow Road, and Yankee Street. While swimming within the reservoir is prohibited, recreational activities such as fishing, boating, and sailing are permitted with public landings and fishing areas provided at several locations around the perimeter of the reservoir.

== Geography ==
Located in the southeastern part of Delaware County, Genoa Township is part of the central Ohio region which is anchored by Columbus. The commute from Genoa Township to the job and entertainment center of downtown Columbus is less than twenty miles. Nearby shopping destinations Polaris Fashion Place (<5 miles), Tanger Outlet Mall (<8 miles), and Easton Town Center (<10 miles) are easily accessible from Genoa Township.

Genoa Township borders the following townships and city:

- City of Westerville - southwest
- The City of Columbus owns the land encompassing Hoover Reservoir within Genoa Township preserving open space at Hoover Meadows and Mud Hen Marsh.
- Orange Township - west
- Berkshire Township - north
- Harlem Township - east
- Plain Township, Franklin County - southeast corner
- Trenton Township - northeast corner
- Blendon Township, Franklin County - south
- Berlin Township - northwest corner

The Highland Lakes and Medallion golf course communities constitute a significant portion of the largely developed southern portion of the township. The northern half of Genoa Township is still generally rural, but beginning to be developed as well. Genoa Township is one of the fastest growing areas near Columbus.

A majority of the southern portion of the Township from the Delaware County border with Franklin County northward to Maxtown Road were annexed by the City of Westerville decades ago.

== Demographics ==
=== 2020 census ===
Genoa Township racial composition
Race	Number	Percentage
White (NH)	20,498	82.6%
Black or African American (NH)	1,124	4.53%
Native American (NH)	38	0.15%
Asian (NH)	1,122	4.52%
Pacific Islander (NH)	12	0.05%
Other/mixed	1,383	5.58%
Hispanic or Latino	629	2.54%

=== 2010 census ===
As of the census of 2010, there were 23,090 people living in the township. The population density was 1,073.9 inhabitants per square mile (414.6/km^{2}). There were 8,046 housing units at an average density of 374.2 per square mile (144.5/km^{2}). The racial makeup of the township was 89.3% White, 4.7% African American, 0.1% Native American, 3.7% Asian, 0.5% from other races, and 1.6% from two or more races. Hispanic or Latino of any race were 1.8% of the population.

In 2016 the zip codes that encompass Genoa Township were ranked the number one and two "Millionaire Neighborhoods" by Columbus Business First. Again in 2019, Columbus Business First research showed Genoa Township zip code 43021 was ranked first in central Ohio as the "Wealthiest Zip Code" (ranked by median household income) and 43082 was ranked third.

== Government ==
The Township is governed by a three-member Board of Trustees, who are elected in November of odd-numbered years to a four-year term beginning on the following January 1. Two are elected in the year after the presidential election and one is elected in the year before it. There is also an elected township Fiscal Officer, who serves a four-year term beginning on April 1 of the year after the election, which is held in November of the year before the presidential election. Vacancies in the Fiscal Office or on the Board of Trustees are filled by the Trustees via a special appointment until an election can be held. The Trustees currently employ a Township Administrator to oversee the day-to-day operations of the Township and its staff.

== Notable residents ==
- Jason Day, professional golfer on the PGA Tour
- Gabby Douglas, gymnast and 2012 Olympic gold medalist trained at Buckeye Gymnastics in Genoa Township
- Archie Griffin, two-time Heisman Trophy Winner at The Ohio State University
- John Kasich, Governor of Ohio (2011–2018)
- Pat Tiberi, U.S. Representative, Ohio's 12th congressional district (2001–2018)
- Nick Vannett, Ohio State University football player
- Rick Carfagna, Ohio House of Representatives (2017–2022)
