= Plain Township, Franklin County, Ohio =

Township in Ohio, US

- Township
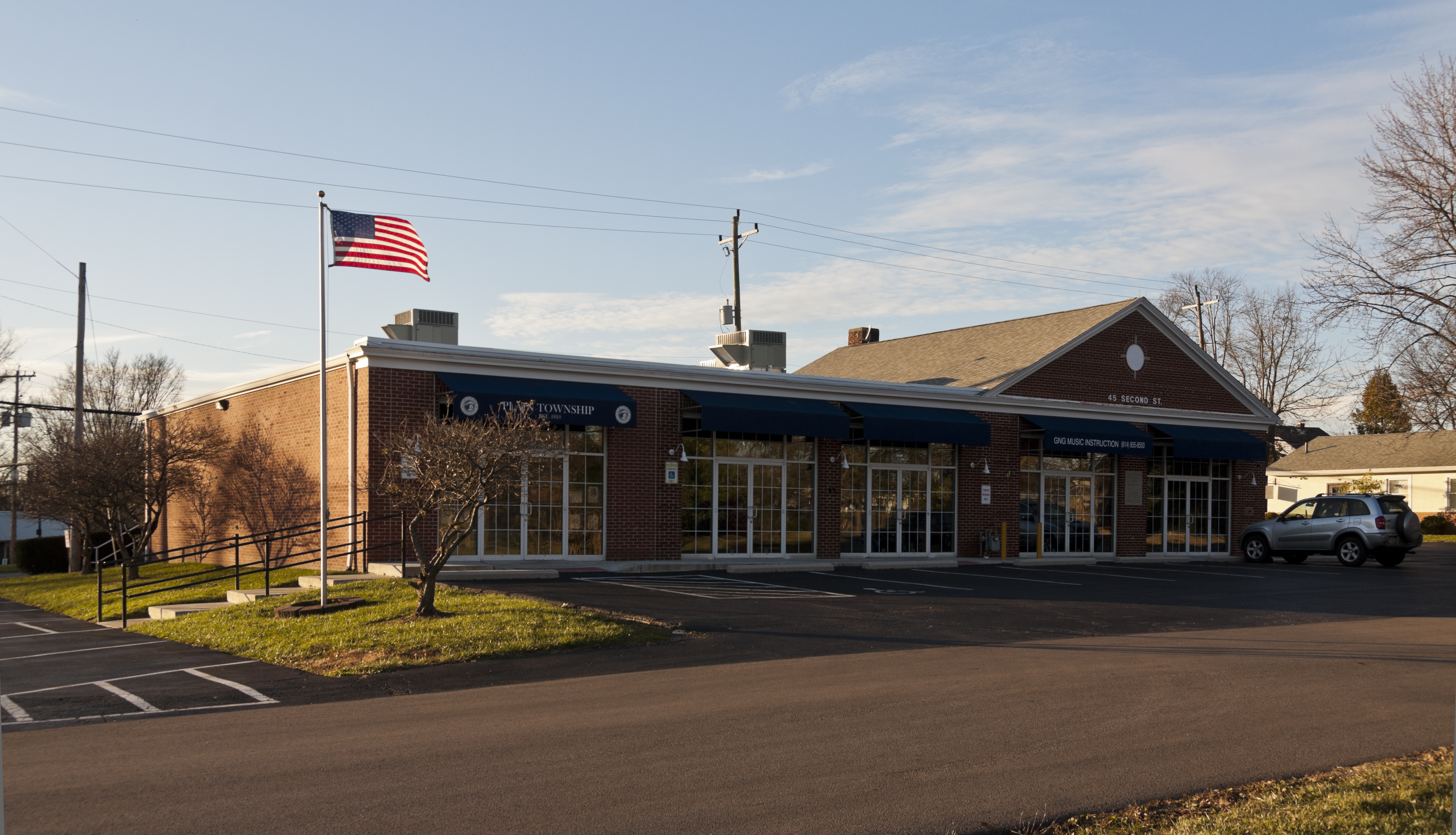
- Plain Township Townhall

- Location of Plain Township in Franklin County
- Coordinates: 40°5′3″N 82°49′29″W
- Country: United States
- State: Ohio
- County: Franklin

Area
  - Total: 20.4 sq mi (52.8 km^{2})
  - Land: 20.1 sq mi (52.1 km^{2})
  - Water: 0.27 sq mi (0.7 km^{2})
- Elevation: 1,027 ft (313 m)

Population (2020)
  - Total: 12,761
  - Density: 634/sq mi (245/km^{2})
- Time zone: UTC-5 (Eastern (EST))
  - Summer (DST): UTC-4 (EDT)
- FIPS code: 39-62974
- GNIS feature ID: 1086111
- Website: www.plaintownship.org

Plain Township is one of the seventeen townships of Franklin County, Ohio, United States. As of the 2020 census the population was 12,761.

== Geography ==
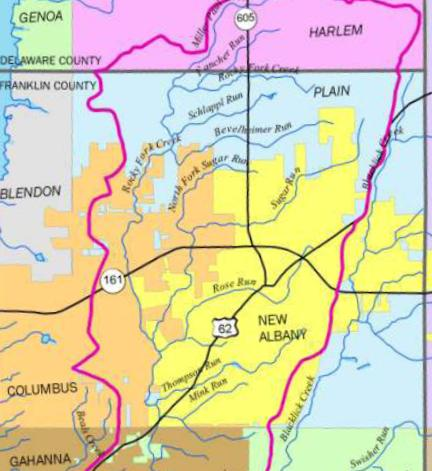
The runs of the Rocky Fork Creek and Blacklick Creek in Plain Township (blue) and New Albany (yellow), in the northeast corner of Franklin County.

Located in the northeastern corner of the county, it consists of a large section in the north and east and several small "islands" in the southwest. While the islands are surrounded by the city of Columbus, the large section borders the following townships and cities:

- Harlem Township, Delaware County - north
- Monroe Township, Licking County - northeast corner
- Jersey Township, Licking County - east
- Pataskala - southeast corner
- Jefferson Township - south
- Columbus - southwest
- Blendon Township - west
- Genoa Township, Delaware County - northwest corner

Two municipalities are located in Plain Township:

- Part of the city of Columbus, in the southwest
- The city of New Albany, in the center

The northern part of Plain Township is situated in the headwaters of the Rocky Fork Creek, a tributary of the Big Walnut Creek. From north to south, the Fancher Run, Schleppi Run, Bevelheimer Run, and Sugar Run of the Rocky Fork Creek wind through the township. Blacklick Creek runs from the northeast part of the township, south through New Albany, and on to the southeast section of the township.

== Name and history ==
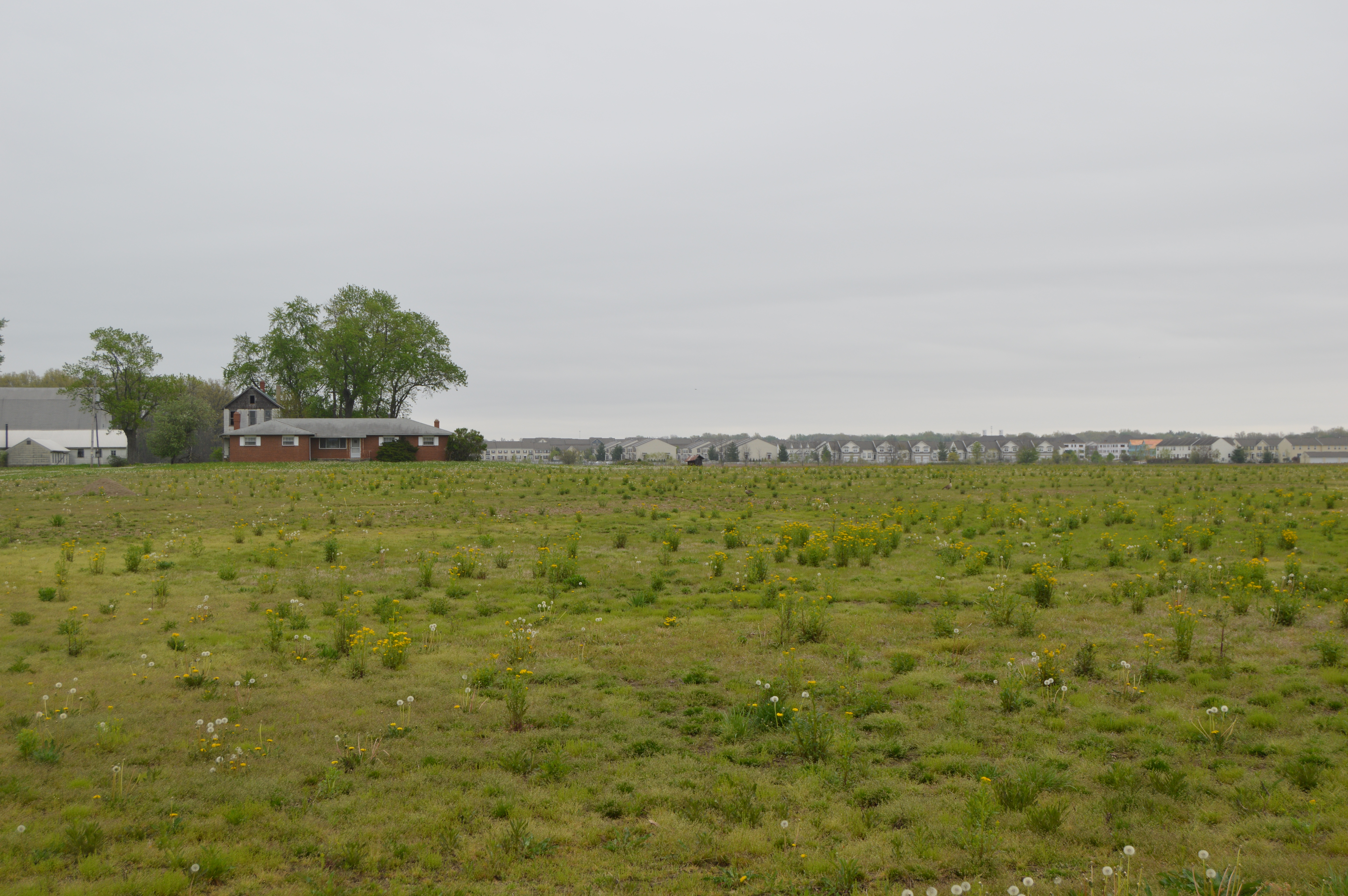
Fields along Schott Road

Statewide, other Plain Townships are located in Stark, Wayne, and Wood counties.

Plain Township was organized in 1810.

In 1815-1816, Plain Township was reduced to its present size of about 20,000 squares acres.

In 1967, a new Post Office was built by Gene and Louse Mayer and leased to the State.

In 1970 Plain Township stretched 5 by 5 miles (8 by 8 km), with the only exception to its being a full 25 square miles (65 km^{2}) being the fairly small town of New Albany. The south-central part of the township has since mainly become part of New Albany, while the southwest has been annexed by Columbus.

In the 1990s, the fire department became a full-time professional department, in 1997, the new Plain Township was built at 9500 Johnstown Road.

== Government ==
The township is governed by a three-member board of trustees, who are elected in November of odd-numbered years to a four-year term beginning on the following January 1. Two are elected in the year after the presidential election and one is elected in the year before it. There is also an elected township fiscal officer, who serves a four-year term beginning on April 1 of the year after the election, which is held in November of the year before the presidential election. Vacancies in the fiscal officer ship or on the board of trustees are filled by the remaining trustees.
