= Harlem Township, Delaware County, Ohio =

Township in Ohio, US

- Township
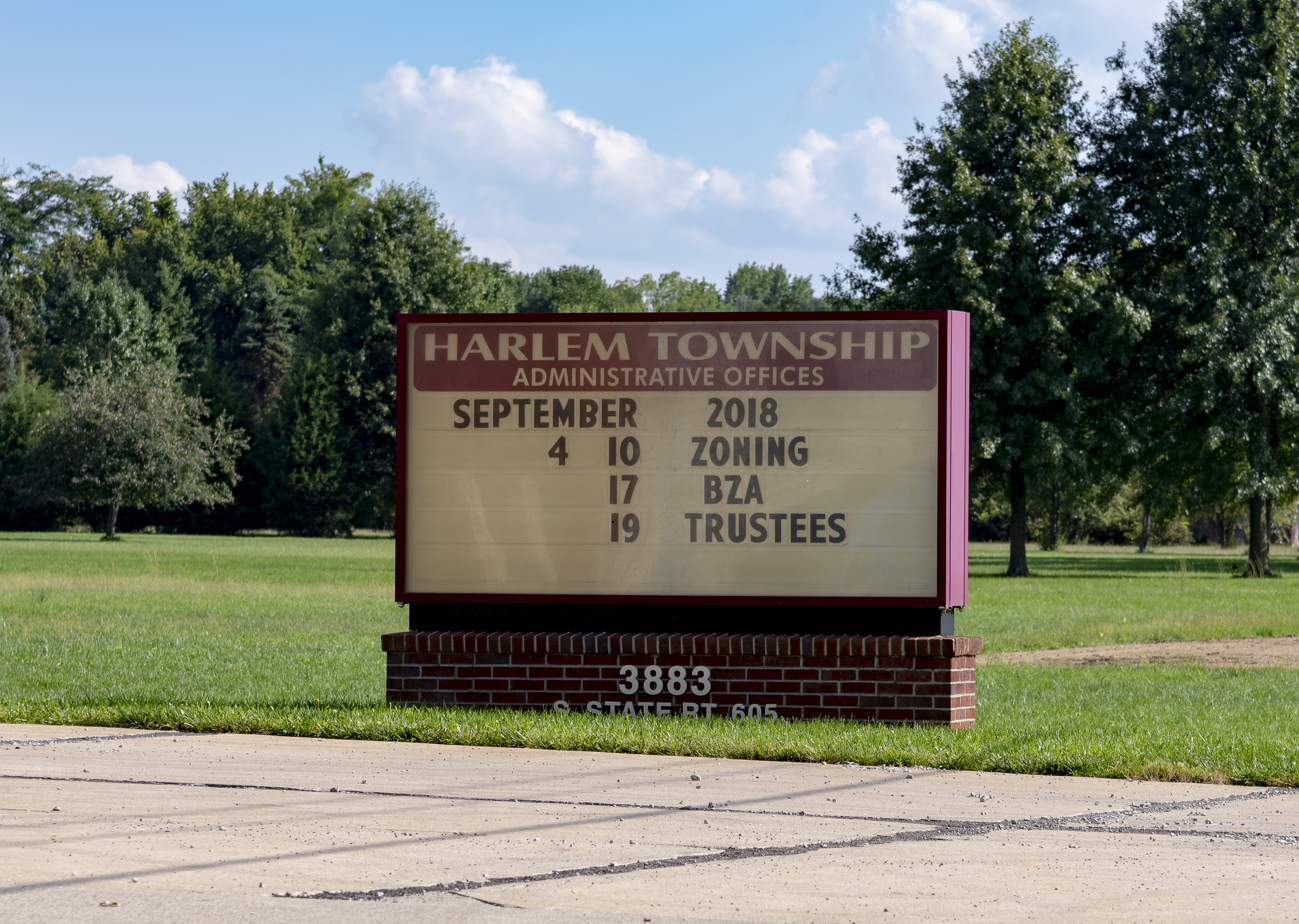

- Location of Harlem Township in Delaware County
- Coordinates: 40°9′43″N 82°48′12″W
- Country: United States
- State: Ohio
- County: Delaware

Area
  - Total: 26.56 sq mi (68.80 km^{2})
  - Land: 26.56 sq mi (68.78 km^{2})
  - Water: 0.0077 sq mi (0.02 km^{2})
- Elevation: 1,024 ft (312 m)

Population (2020)
  - Total: 4,554
  - Density: 171.5/sq mi (66.21/km^{2})
- Time zone: UTC-5 (Eastern (EST))
  - Summer (DST): UTC-4 (EDT)
- FIPS code: 39-33516
- GNIS feature ID: 1086048
- Website: www.harlemtwp.com

Harlem Township is one of the eighteen townships of Delaware County, Ohio, United States. The 2020 census reported a population of 4,554 in the township.

== Geography ==
Located in the southeastern corner of the county, it borders the following townships:

- Trenton Township - north
- Hartford Township, Licking County - northeast corner
- Monroe Township, Licking County - east
- Jersey Township, Licking County - southeast corner
- Plain Township, Franklin County - south
- Blendon Township, Franklin County - southwest corner
- Genoa Township - west
- Berkshire Township - northwest corner

No municipalities are located in Harlem Township.

Duncan Run is a stream that runs through Harlem township, flowing into Hoover reservoir.

== Name and history ==
Harlem Township was organized in 1810.

It is the only Harlem Township statewide.

== Government ==
The township is governed by a three-member board of trustees, who are elected in November of odd-numbered years to a four-year term beginning on the following January 1. Two are elected in the year after the presidential election and one is elected in the year before it. There is also an elected township fiscal officer, who serves a four-year term beginning on April 1 of the year after the election, which is held in November of the year before the presidential election. Vacancies in the fiscal officership or on the board of trustees are filled by the remaining trustees.

== Public services ==
Emergency services in Harlem Township are provided by the Harlem Township Division of Fire. The department is staffed 24/7 with the capability to provide fire/rescue and ALS medical services.

== Gallery ==
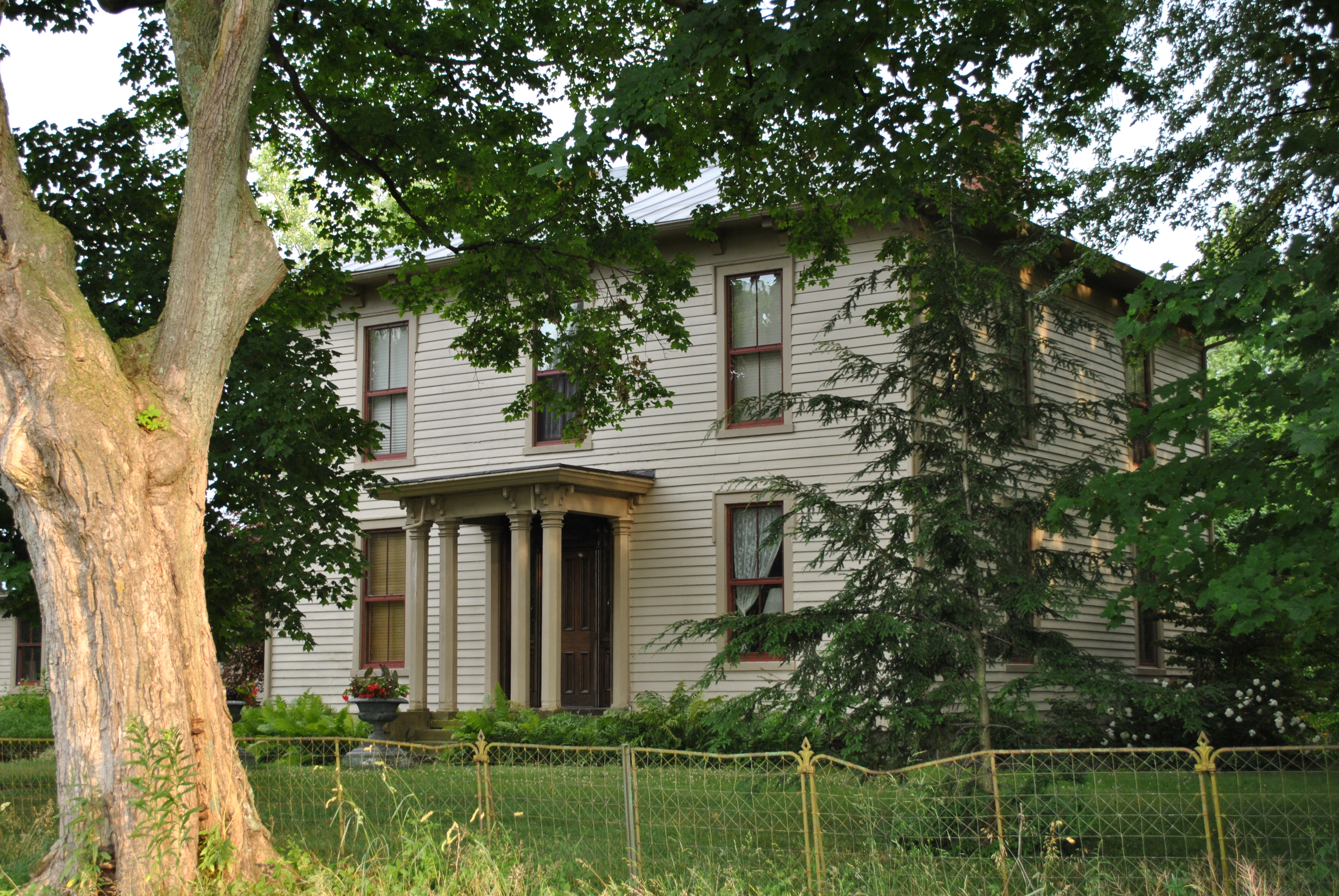
John Cook Farm house

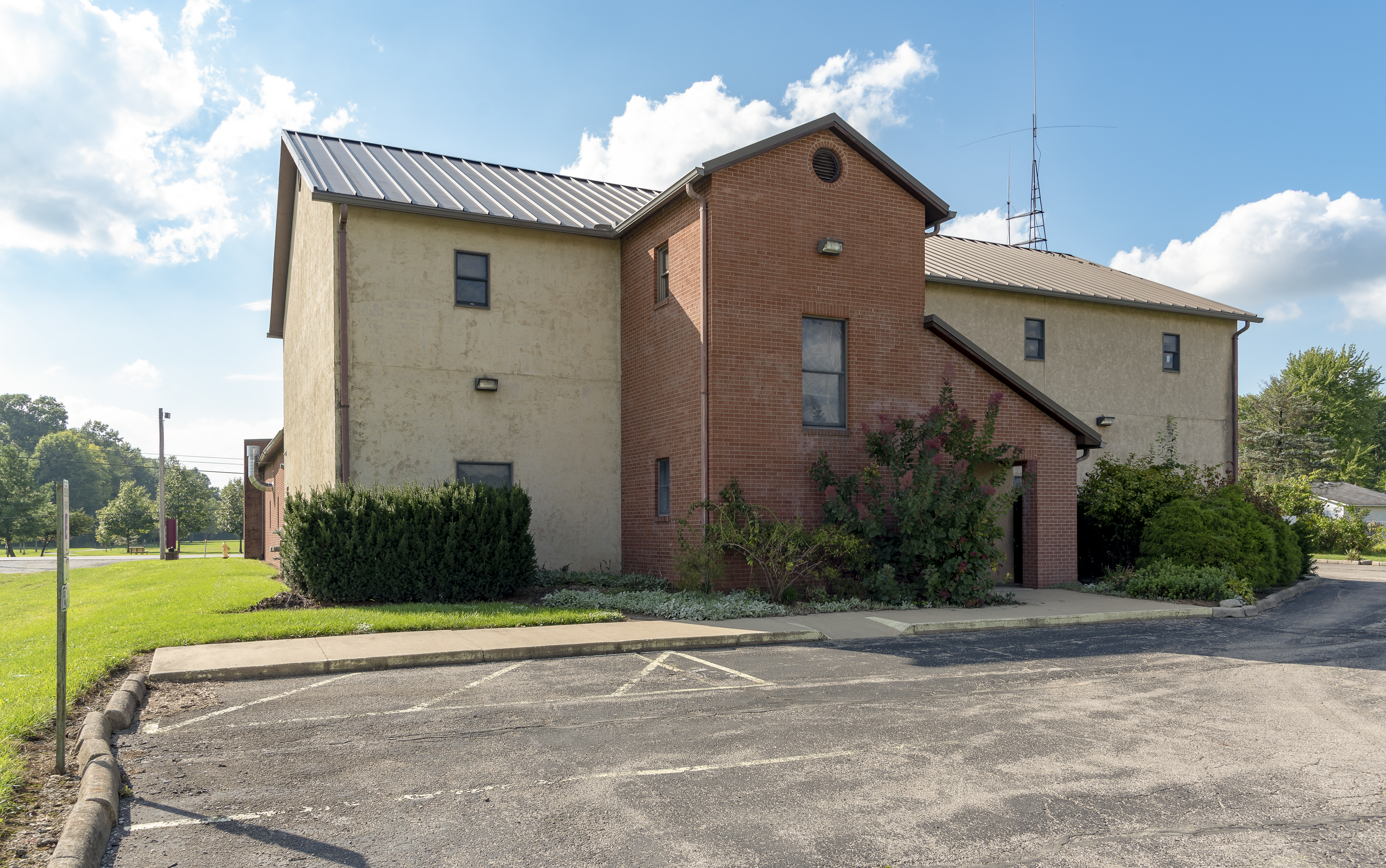
Harlem Township Hall

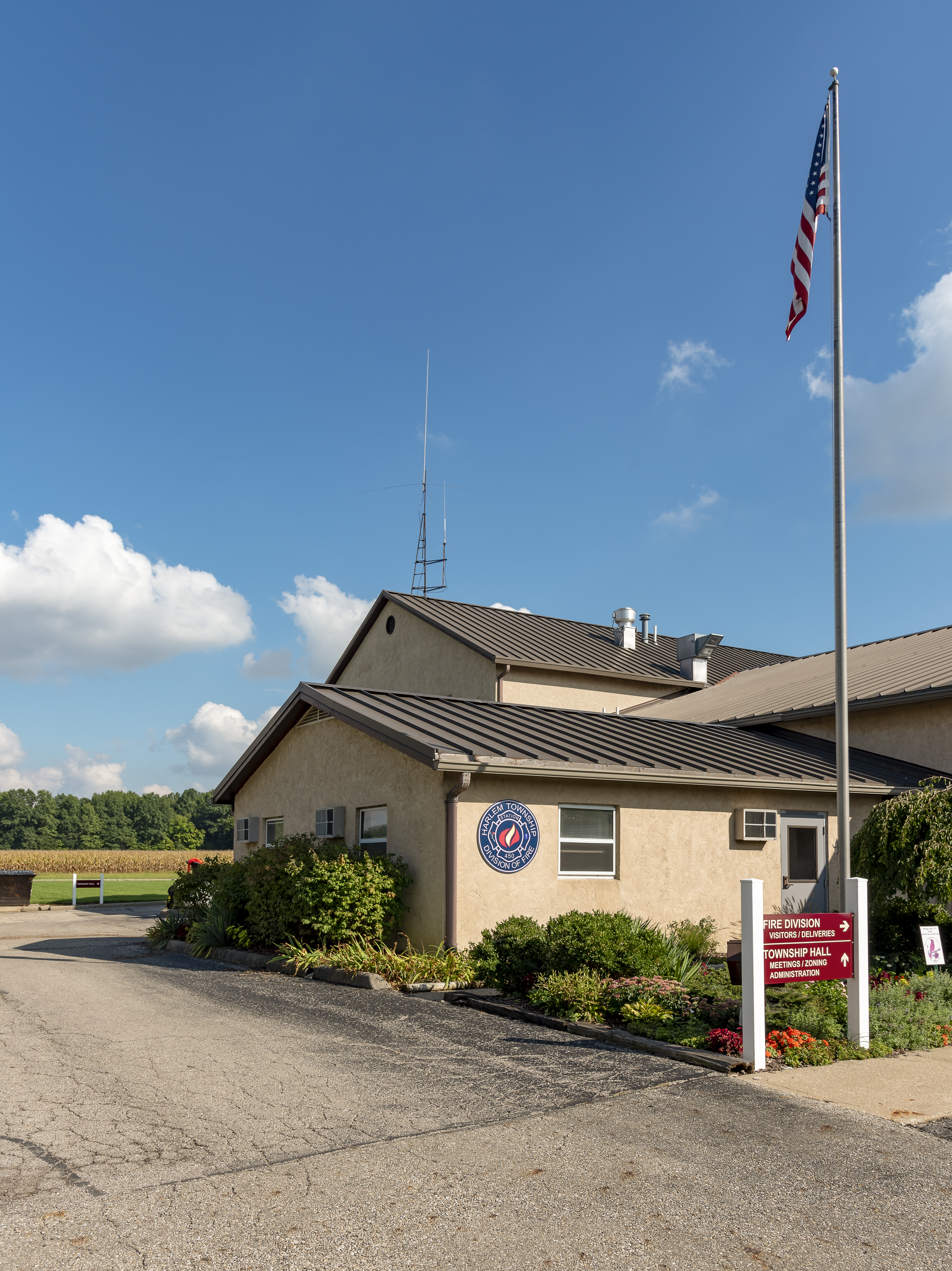
Harlem Township Division of Fire Headquarters

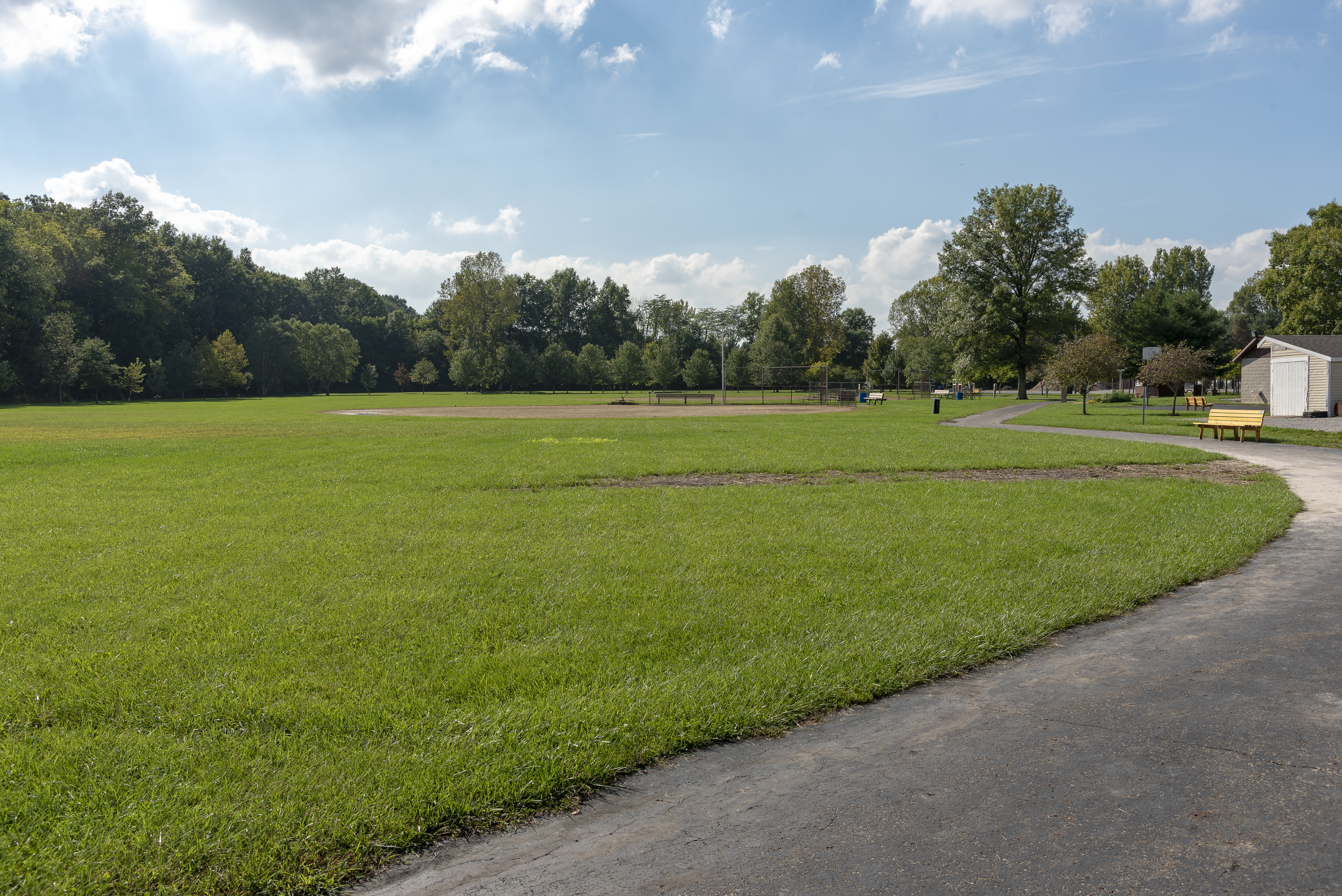
Harlem Township Community Park
