= Huber Ridge, Ohio =

- Census-designated place
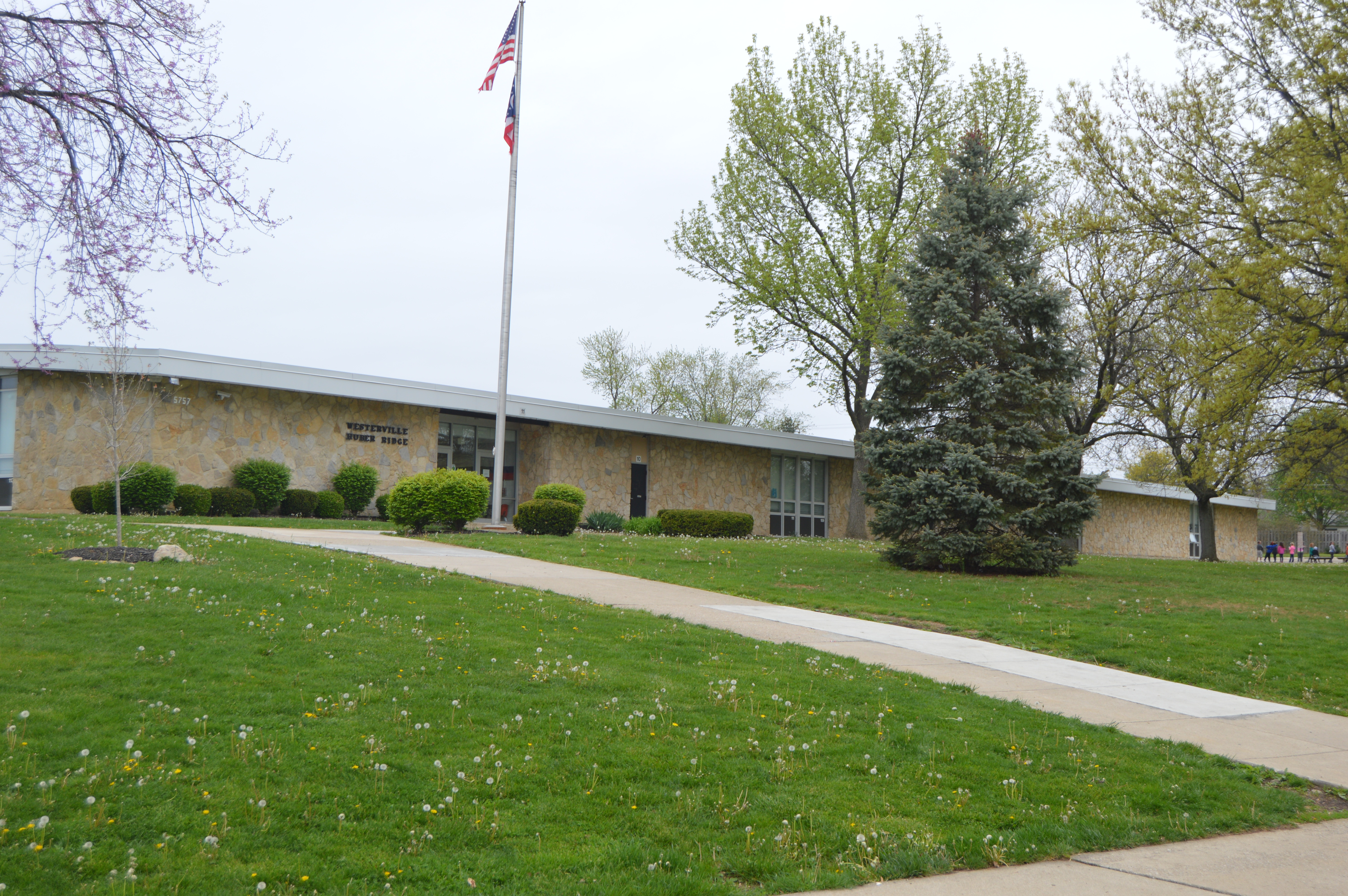
- Huber Ridge Elementary School

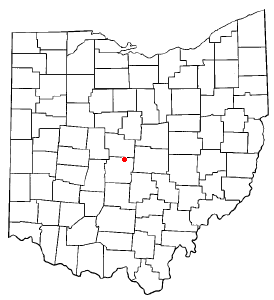
- Location of Huber Ridge, Ohio
- Coordinates: 40°05′28″N 82°55′02″W
- Country: United States
- State: Ohio
- County: Franklin
- Township: Blendon

Area
  - Total: 1.06 sq mi (2.74 km^{2})
  - Land: 1.05 sq mi (2.71 km^{2})
  - Water: 0.012 sq mi (0.03 km^{2})
- Elevation: 833 ft (254 m)

Population (2020)
  - Total: 4,940
  - Density: 4,718.2/sq mi (1,821.72/km^{2})
- Time zone: UTC-5 (Eastern (EST))
  - Summer (DST): UTC-4 (EDT)
- FIPS code: 39-36624
- GNIS feature ID: 2393059

Huber Ridge is a census-designated place (CDP) in Blendon Township, Franklin County, Ohio, United States. The population was 4,940 at the 2020 census.

== Geography ==
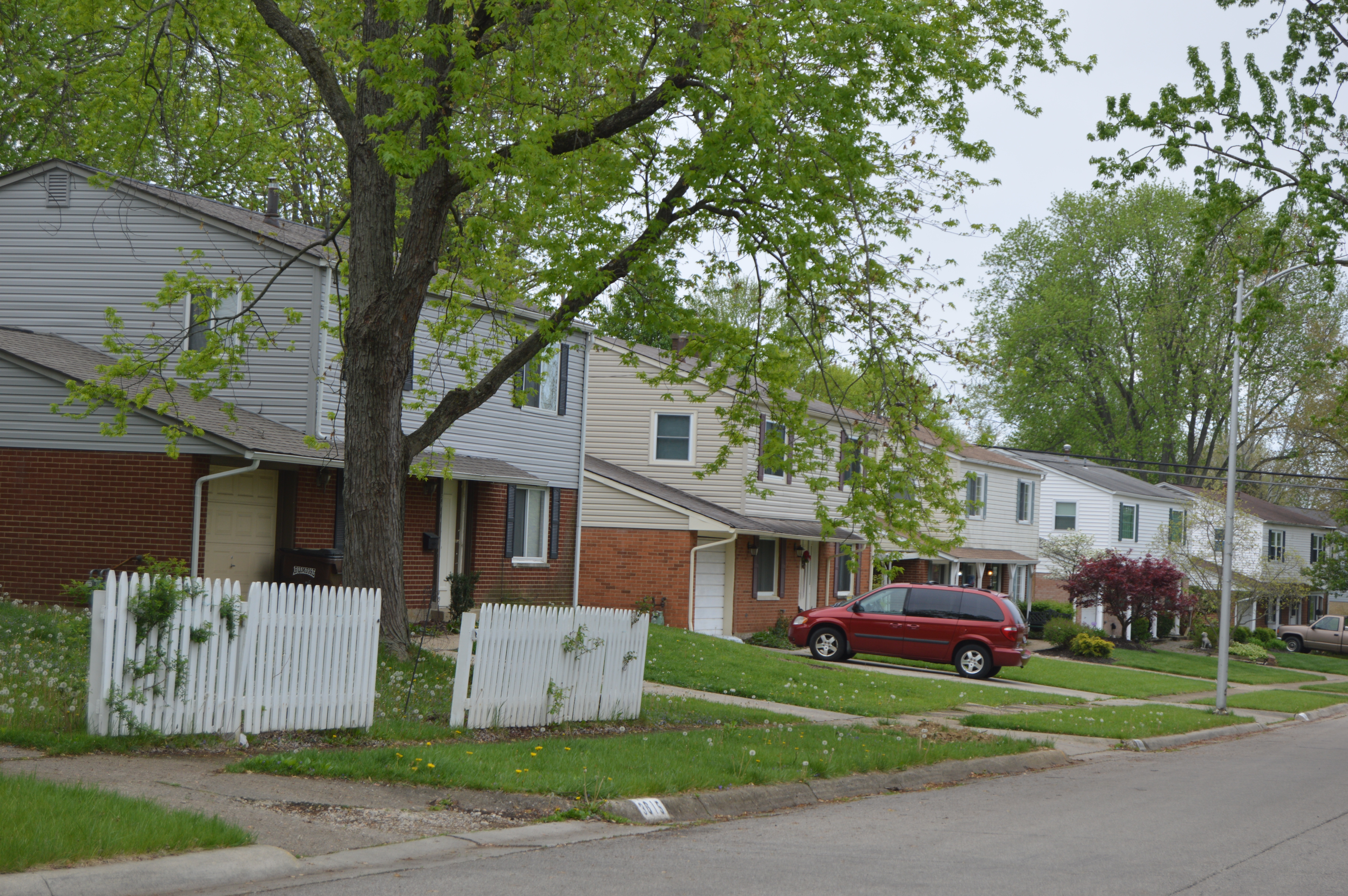
Houses on Panama Drive

Huber Ridge is located in northeastern Franklin County. Interstate 270, the beltway around Columbus, forms the northern and eastern edges of the CDP. The southern border is Ohio State Route 161 (E. Dublin Granville Road), and the southwest edge follows Alum Creek, a tributary of the Scioto River. The western edge of Huber Ridge is west of Ohio State Route 3 (Westerville Road).

The city of Columbus borders Huber Ridge to the west and south, and the city of Westerville is to the north, across I-270.

According to the United States Census Bureau, the Huber Ridge CDP has a total area of 1.0 square mile (2.7 km^{2}), of which 0.01 square miles (0.03 km^{2}), or 0.96%, is water.

== Demographics ==
Historical population
| Census | Pop. | Note | %± |
|---|---|---|---|
| 2020 | 4,940 | | — |
U.S. Decennial Census

=== 2020 census ===
As of the 2020 census, Huber Ridge had a population of 4,940. The median age was 33.8 years. 28.2% of residents were under the age of 18 and 10.5% of residents were 65 years of age or older. For every 100 females there were 89.3 males, and for every 100 females age 18 and over there were 87.4 males age 18 and over.

100.0% of residents lived in urban areas, while 0.0% lived in rural areas.

There were 1,758 households in Huber Ridge, of which 39.5% had children under the age of 18 living in them. Of all households, 49.0% were married-couple households, 14.4% were households with a male householder and no spouse or partner present, and 27.8% were households with a female householder and no spouse or partner present. About 21.1% of all households were made up of individuals and 8.0% had someone living alone who was 65 years of age or older.

There were 1,790 housing units, of which 1.8% were vacant. The homeowner vacancy rate was 1.1% and the rental vacancy rate was 0.4%.

Racial composition as of the 2020 census
| Race | Number | Percent |
|---|---|---|
| White | 3,622 | 73.3% |
| Black or African American | 682 | 13.8% |
| American Indian and Alaska Native | 14 | 0.3% |
| Asian | 88 | 1.8% |
| Native Hawaiian and Other Pacific Islander | 2 | 0.0% |
| Some other race | 97 | 2.0% |
| Two or more races | 435 | 8.8% |
| Hispanic or Latino (of any race) | 253 | 5.1% |

=== 2000 census ===
As of the census of 2000, there were 4,883 people, 1,737 households, and 1,344 families residing in the CDP. The population density was 4,492.5 inhabitants per square mile (1,734.6/km^{2}). There were 1,788 housing units at an average density of 1,645.0 per square mile (635.1/km^{2}). The racial makeup of the CDP was 91.13% White, 5.47% Black or African American, 0.20% Native American, 0.98% Asian, 0.45% from other races, and 1.76% from two or more races. Hispanic or Latino of any race were 1.25% of the population.

There were 1,737 households, out of which 43.1% had children under the age of 18 living with them, 60.4% were married couples living together, 13.1% had a female householder with no husband present, and 22.6% were non-families. 17.0% of all households were made up of individuals, and 4.5% had someone living alone who was 65 years of age or older. The average household size was 2.81 and the average family size was 3.17.

In the CDP the population was spread out, with 30.9% under the age of 18, 7.5% from 18 to 24, 34.2% from 25 to 44, 19.9% from 45 to 64, and 7.5% who were 65 years of age or older. The median age was 32 years. For every 100 females there were 90.7 males. For every 100 females age 18 and over, there were 90.3 males.

The median income for a household in the CDP was $51,289, and the median income for a family was $55,855. Males had a median income of $37,386 versus $27,733 for females. The per capita income for the CDP was $19,842. About 2.2% of families and 3.8% of the population were below the poverty line, including 6.2% of those under age 18 and none of those age 65 or over.
