= Marcus Curtiss Inn =

Historic inn in Ohio, United States

- U.S. National Register of Historic Places
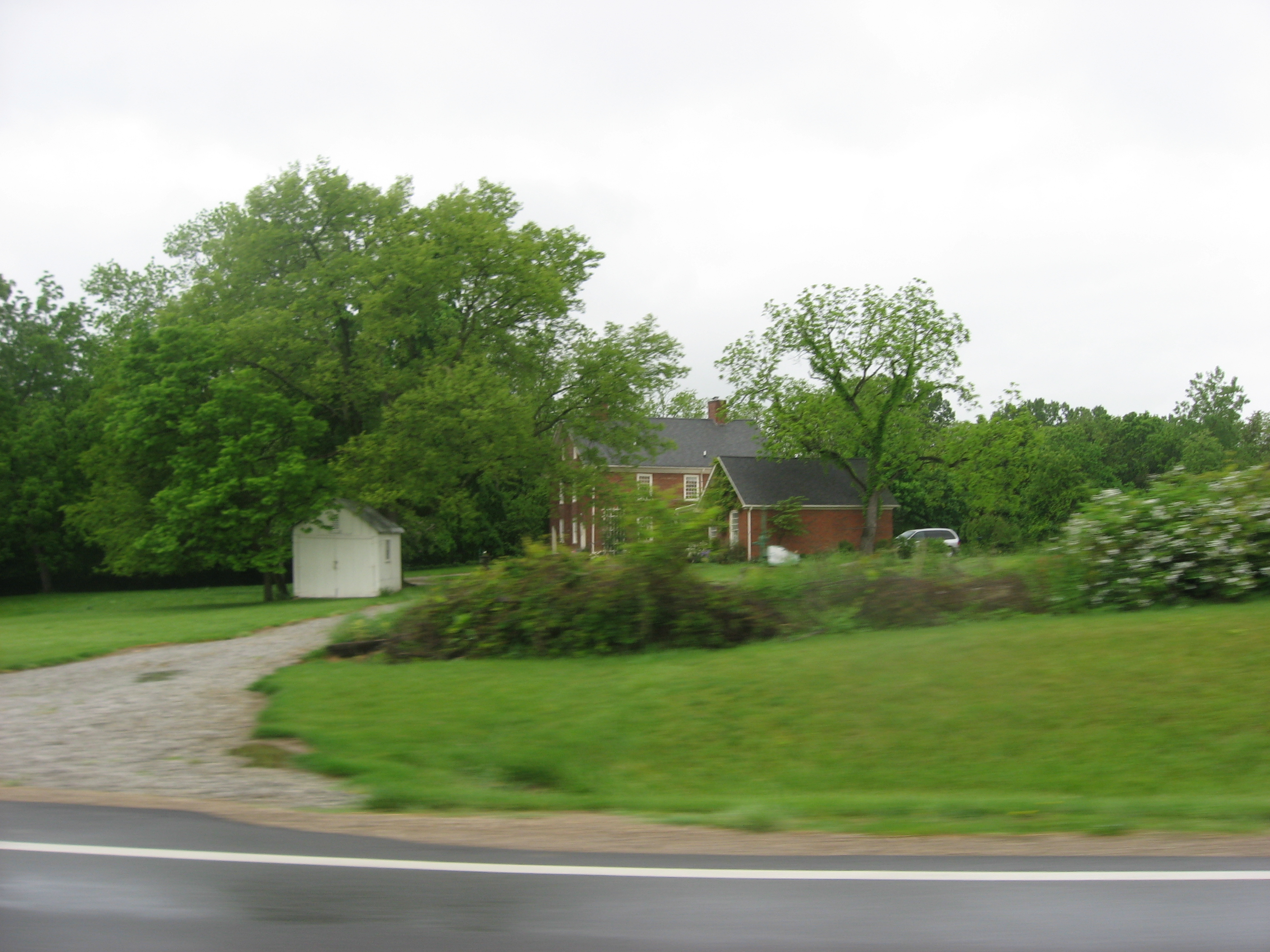
- Roadside view of the property

- Location within Ohio Location within the United States
- Location: 3860 Sunbury Road
- Nearest city: Galena, Ohio
- Coordinates: 40°11′30″N 82°52′26″W
- Area: Less than 1 acre (0.40 ha)
- Built: 1822
- Architect: Marcus Curtiss
- NRHP reference No.: 76001415
- Added to NRHP: December 12, 1976

The Marcus Curtiss Inn is a historic house and post office located near Galena in Genoa Township, Delaware County, Ohio, United States. A native of Connecticut, Curtiss moved to present-day Genoa Township in 1808, becoming the first settler in the area, along with his family, his brother's family, and a third family who also moved from Connecticut. Here, he established himself on 681 acres (276 ha) of land and began to farm; part of his land was very clayey, and Curtiss decided to start a brickworks on the site. Although he left home to serve in the War of 1812, he returned to modern Delaware County after the war and resumed construction on the present house.

Curtiss was a pioneering member of local society in multiple ways due to his new building: besides being the first brick house in the area, it was the township's first post office and one of the first inns. He designed the structure with a simple floor plan: measuring two-and-a-half stories tall, the building is laid out as a rectangle with a simple arrangement of rooms. The present building was completed in 1822. Today, the building is covered with a metal roof.

To the present day, the Marcus Curtiss Inn remains in use as a private residence. In late 1976, the inn was listed on the National Register of Historic Places, both because of its historically significant architecture and because of its place in local history.
