= Jersey, Ohio =

- Census-designated place
- Location within Ohio Location within the United States
- Coordinates: 40°03′21″N 82°43′22″W
- Country: United States
- State: Ohio
- County: Licking
- Township: Jersey

Area
  - Total: 1.65 sq mi (4.27 km^{2})
  - Land: 1.64 sq mi (4.25 km^{2})
  - Water: 0.0077 sq mi (0.02 km^{2})
- Elevation: 1,129 ft (344 m)

Population (2020)
  - Total: 427
  - Density: 260.4/sq mi (100.55/km^{2})
- Time zone: UTC-5 (Eastern (EST))
  - Summer (DST): UTC-4 (EDT)
- FIPS code: 39-39088
- GNIS feature ID: 2812825

Jersey is a census-designated place (CDP) in Licking County, in the U.S. state of Ohio. As of the 2020 census, Jersey had a population of 427.

== History ==
Jersey was laid out in 1832, taking its name from Jersey Township. A post office was established at Jersey in 1833, and remained in operation until 1907.

== Demographics ==
Historical population
Census	Pop.	Note	%±
2020	427		—
U.S. Decennial Census
