= Jersey Township, Licking County, Ohio =

Township in Ohio, US

- Township
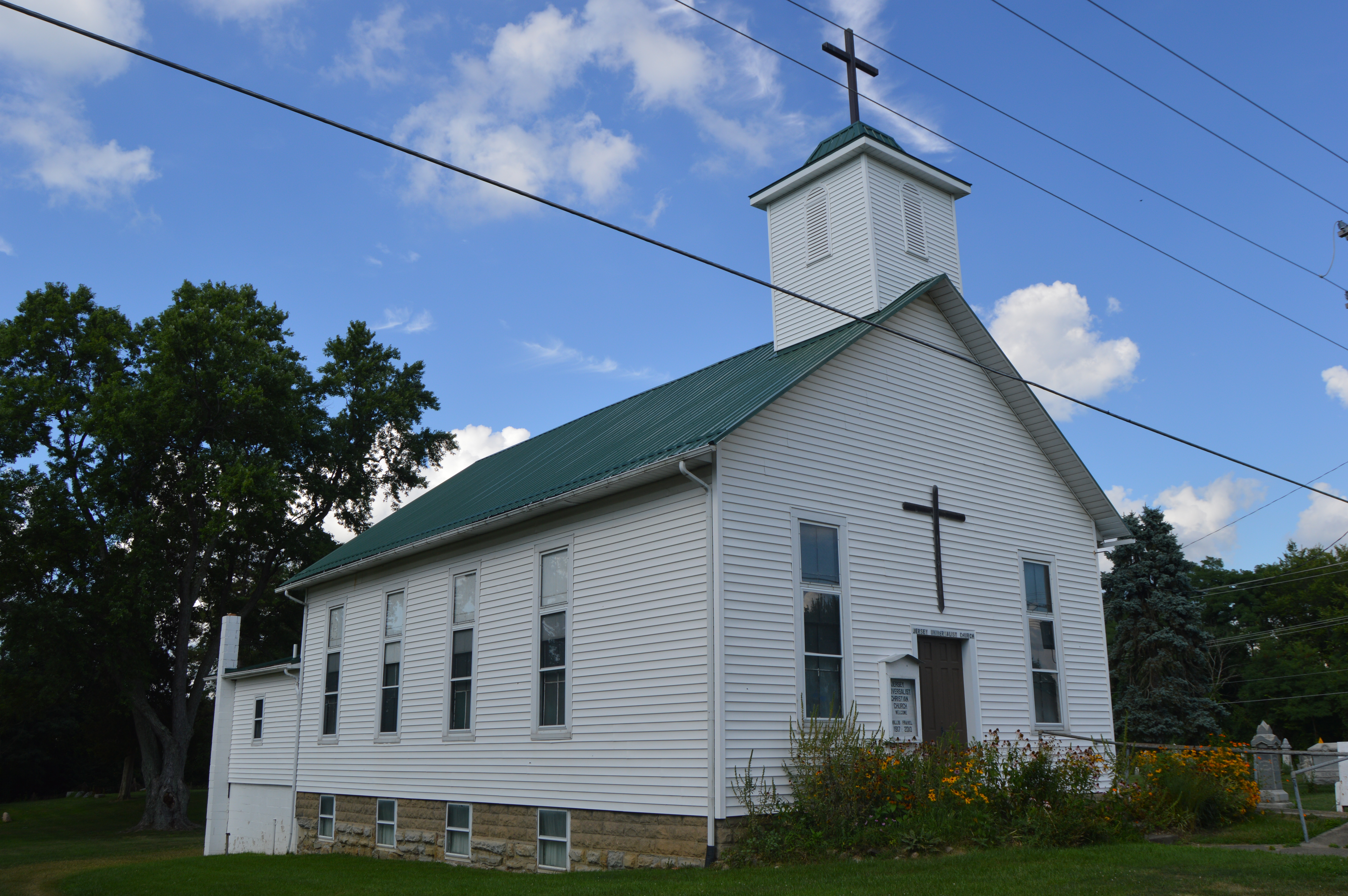
- Jersey Universalist Church

- Location of Jersey Township in Licking County
- Coordinates: 40°5′8″N 82°42′59″W
- Country: United States
- State: Ohio
- County: Licking

Area
  - Total: 27.24 sq mi (70.56 km^{2})
  - Land: 27.12 sq mi (70.24 km^{2})
  - Water: 0.12 sq mi (0.31 km^{2})
- Elevation: 1,201 ft (366 m)

Population (2020)
  - Total: 2,557
  - Density: 94.29/sq mi (36.40/km^{2})
- Time zone: UTC-5 (Eastern (EST))
  - Summer (DST): UTC-4 (EDT)
- FIPS code: 39-39102
- GNIS feature ID: 1086465
- Website: jerseytownship.us

Jersey Township is one of the 25 townships of Licking County, Ohio, United States. As of the 2020 census, the population was 2,557.

== Geography ==
Located on the western edge of the county, it borders the following townships and city:

- Monroe Township - north
- Liberty Township - northeast corner
- St. Albans Township - east
- Harrison Township - southeast corner
- Pataskala - south
- Jefferson Township, Franklin County - southwest corner
- Plain Township, Franklin County - west
- Harlem Township, Delaware County - northwest corner

Part of the city of New Albany is located in western Jersey Township. The census-designated place of Jersey is located within the township.

== Name and history ==
Jersey Township was established in 1820. The township was named after New Jersey, the native state of a large share of the early settlers. It is the only Jersey Township statewide.

== Government ==
The township is governed by a three-member board of trustees, who are elected in November of odd-numbered years to a four-year term beginning on the following January 1. Two are elected in the year after the presidential election and one is elected in the year before it. There is also an elected township fiscal officer, who serves a four-year term beginning on April 1 of the year after the election, which is held in November of the year before the presidential election. Vacancies in the fiscal officership or on the board of trustees are filled by the remaining trustees.
