= Munira Abdullahi =

American politician (born 1995)

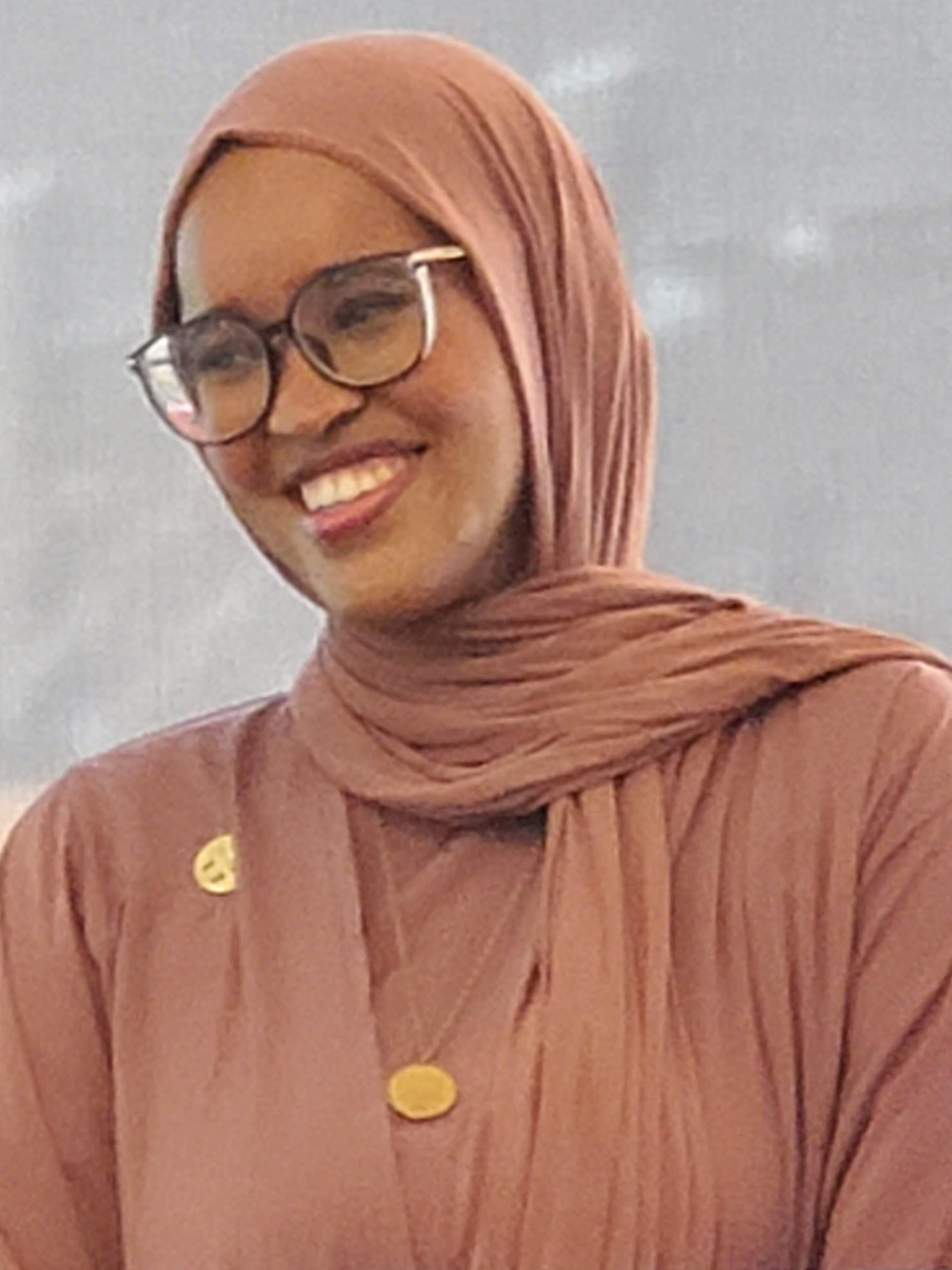
- Abdullahi in April 2024

Member of the Ohio House of Representatives from the 9th district
- Incumbent
- Assumed office January 1, 2023
- Preceded by: Bishara Addison

Personal details
- Born: 1995 or 1996 (age 30–31) Kenya
- Party: Democratic
- Education: Ohio State University (BA)

Munira Yasin Abdullahi (born 1995/1996) is both the first Muslim woman and first Somali woman to serve in the Ohio State Legislature. She is the representative for Ohio House District 9 and is currently running for Mayor of Columbus in 2027.

== Early life and career ==
Munira was born in a refugee camp in Kenya, and moved to the US when she was 2 years old. She and her family moved to an apartment in the Northside neighborhood of Columbus, Ohio. She has type 1 diabetes. Abdullahi graduated from Columbus Alternative High School and completed a bachelor's degree in political science at Ohio State University. Prior to entering politics, Abdullahi worked as a paralegal and community activist. Abdullahi was endorsed by a variety of groups, including Planned Parenthood and Ohio State Medical Association.

== Ohio House of Representatives ==
In the 2022 Ohio House of Representatives election, Abdullahi ran for District 9, newly drawn seat without an incumbent. She won the primary on August 2, 2022, with 67% of the vote over attorney Paul Filippelli. She then ran unopposed in the November 2022 general election. In 2024, she was re-elected with 72% of the vote. She is seeking re-election in the 2026 election and will appear on the general election ballot after running unopposed in the primary.

Abdullahi is an advocate for expanded voting rights, and she opposed frequent voter list purges that threatened to remove new citizens' voter registration. She has also backed congressional term limits and insulin price caps. She's introduced legislation to protect Ohio Businesses Freedom of Expression by repealing Ohio's anti boycott and divest laws. Her other legislation include affordable housing, consumer protection, legislation to prevent health insurance companies from disregarding the professional judgment of licensed medical providers, including expert diagnoses and prescribed treatments. And to establish Tuition Free Higher Education in Ohio.

She also serves as the current Chair of the Ohio House Democratic Women's legislative caucus (ODWLC)

=== Committee assignments ===
Abdullahi currently serves on the following committees in the Ohio House:

- Workforce and Higher Education (ranking member)
- Development
- Finance
