= Liberty Township, Licking County, Ohio =

Township in Ohio, US

- Township
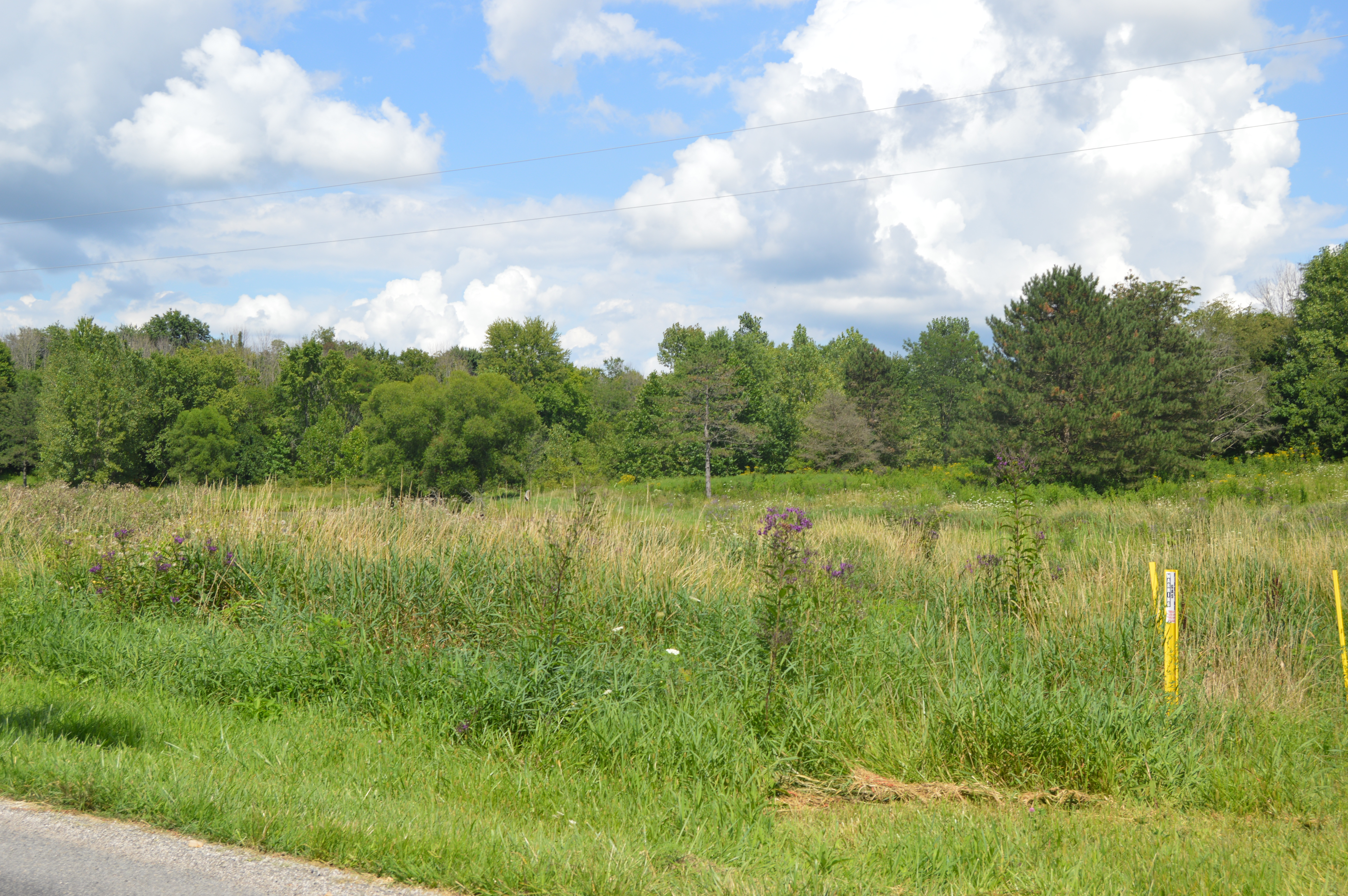
- Open fields just east of Johnstown

- Location of Liberty Township in Licking County
- Coordinates: 40°8′47″N 82°37′52″W
- Country: United States
- State: Ohio
- County: Licking

Area
  - Total: 26.2 sq mi (67.8 km^{2})
  - Land: 26.1 sq mi (67.5 km^{2})
  - Water: 0.12 sq mi (0.3 km^{2})
- Elevation: 1,302 ft (397 m)

Population (2020)
  - Total: 2,756
  - Density: 106/sq mi (40.8/km^{2})
- Time zone: UTC-5 (Eastern (EST))
  - Summer (DST): UTC-4 (EDT)
- FIPS code: 39-43232
- GNIS feature ID: 1086466
- Website: www.libertytwplickingco.com

Liberty Township is one of the 25 townships of Licking County, Ohio, United States. As of the 2020 census, the population was 2,756.

== Geography ==
Located in the northwestern part of the county, it borders the following townships:

- Bennington Township – north
- Burlington Township – northeast corner
- McKean Township – east
- Granville Township – southeast corner
- St. Albans Township – south
- Jersey Township – southwest corner
- Monroe Township – west
- Hartford Township – northwest corner

No municipalities are located in Liberty Township.

== Name and history ==
It is one of 25 Liberty Townships statewide.

== Government ==
The township is governed by a three-member board of trustees, who are elected in November of odd-numbered years to a four-year term beginning on the following January 1. Two are elected in the year after the presidential election and one is elected in the year before it. There is also an elected township fiscal officer, who serves a four-year term beginning on April 1 of the year after the election, which is held in November of the year before the presidential election. Vacancies in the fiscal officership or on the board of trustees are filled by the remaining trustees.
