= Trenton Township, Delaware County, Ohio =

Township in Ohio, US

- Township
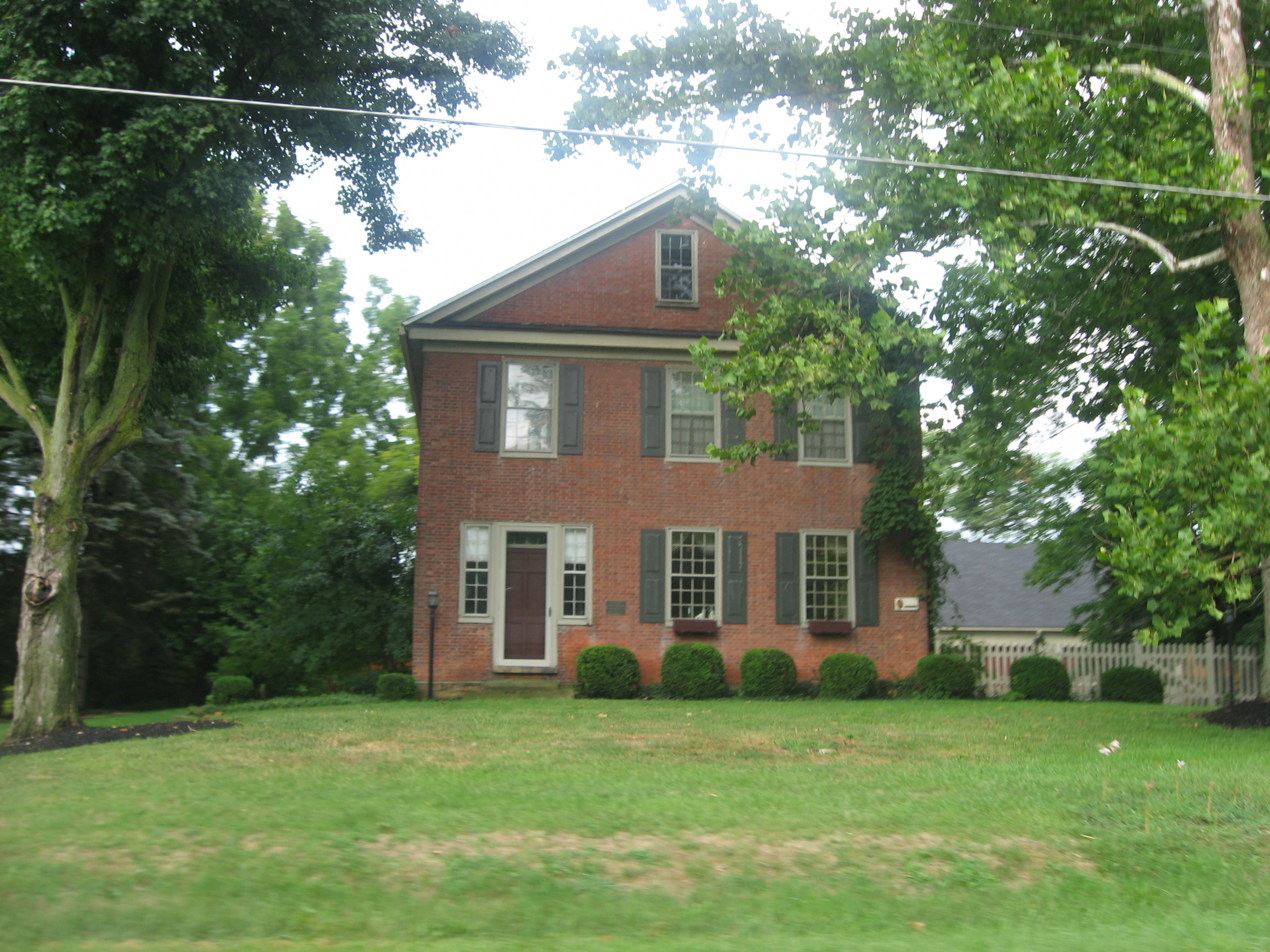
- Center Inn, built 1837

- Location of Trenton Township in Delaware County
- Coordinates: 40°14′9″N 82°48′10″W
- Country: United States
- State: Ohio
- County: Delaware

Area
  - Total: 26.6 sq mi (68.8 km^{2})
  - Land: 26.5 sq mi (68.6 km^{2})
  - Water: 0.077 sq mi (0.2 km^{2})
- Elevation: 1,056 ft (322 m)

Population (2020)
  - Total: 2,276
  - Density: 85.9/sq mi (33.2/km^{2})
- Time zone: UTC-5 (Eastern (EST))
  - Summer (DST): UTC-4 (EDT)
- FIPS code: 39-77336
- GNIS feature ID: 1086059
- Website: https://www.trentontwp.com/

Trenton Township is one of the eighteen townships of Delaware County, Ohio, United States. As of the 2020 Census the population was 2,276.

== Geography ==
Located in the eastern part of the county, it borders the following townships:

- Porter Township - north
- Hilliar Township, Knox County - northeast corner
- Hartford Township, Licking County - east
- Monroe Township, Licking County - southeast corner
- Harlem Township - south
- Genoa Township - southwest corner
- Berkshire Township - west
- Kingston Township - northwest corner

A small part of the village of Sunbury is located in western Trenton Township.

== Name and history ==
Trenton Township was probably named after Trenton, New Jersey.

It is the only Trenton Township statewide.

== Government ==
The township is governed by a three-member board of trustees, who are elected in November of odd-numbered years to a four-year term beginning on the following January 1. Two are elected in the year after the presidential election and one is elected in the year before it. There is also an elected township fiscal officer, who serves a four-year term beginning on April 1 of the year after the election, which is held in November of the year before the presidential election. Vacancies in the fiscal officership or on the board of trustees are filled by the remaining trustees.

== Public services ==
Emergency medical services in Trenton Township are provided by the Delaware County EMS.
