= Hoover Dam (Ohio) =

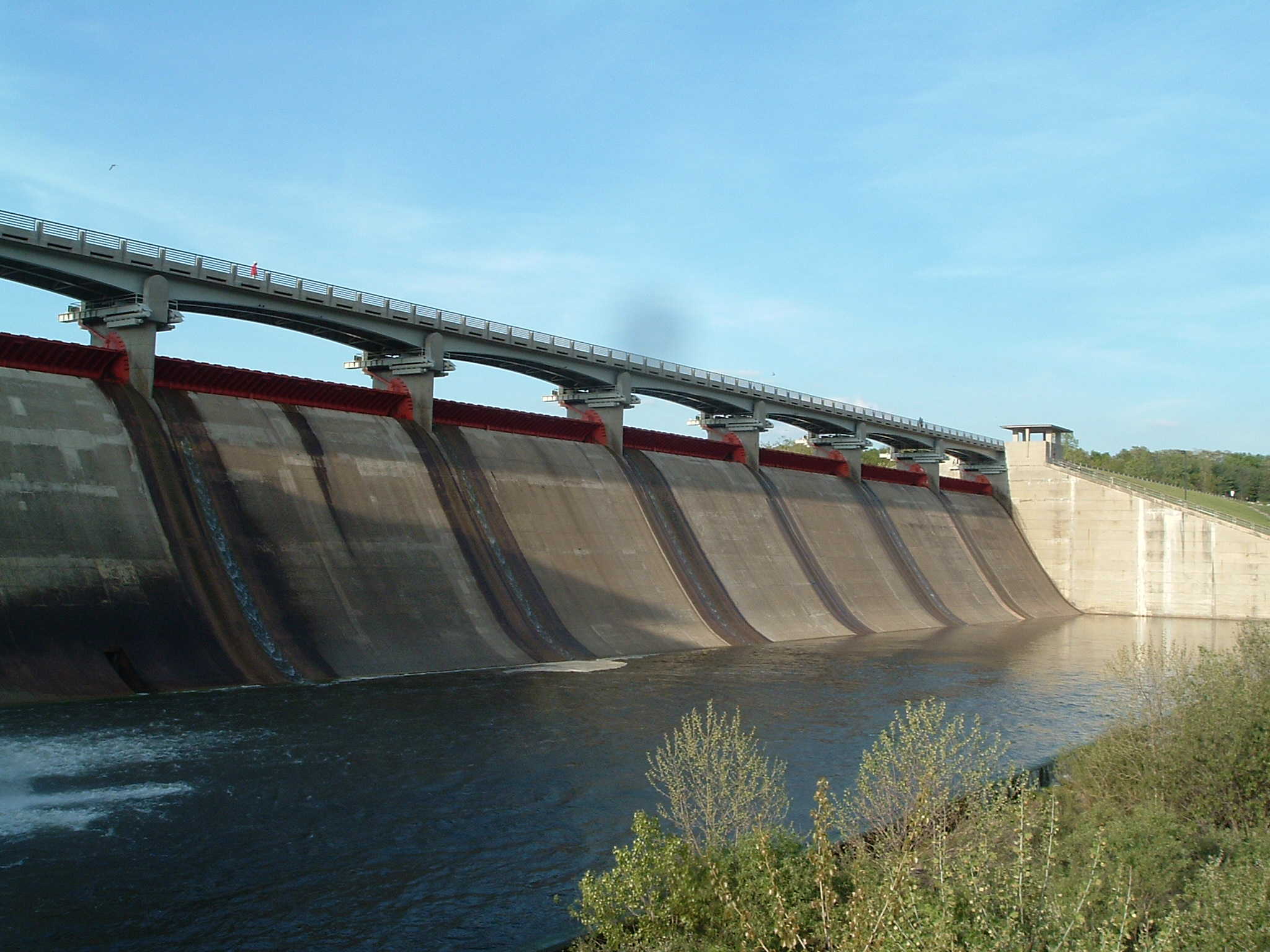

- Location within Ohio
- Interactive map of Hoover Dam
- Country: United States
- Location: Blendon Township, near Westerville
- Coordinates: 40°06′29″N 82°52′54″W
- Status: Operational
- Opening date: 1955
- Owner: City of Columbus, Ohio

Dam and spillways
- Type of dam: Embankment / Concrete gravity composite
- Impounds: Big Walnut Creek
- Height: 94 ft (29 m)
- Length: 2,583 ft (787 m)
- Elevation at crest: 911 ft (278 m)

Reservoir
- Creates: Hoover Reservoir
- Total capacity: 63,832 acre⋅ft (78,735,613 m^{3})
- Surface area: 3,272 acres (13 km^{2})
- Maximum length: 8 mi (13 km)
- Maximum width: 1 mi (2 km)

Hoover Dam, in Blendon Township, Franklin County, Ohio, near Westerville, dams Big Walnut Creek to form the Hoover Memorial Reservoir. Construction began during 1953 due to the increased water demand of post-war Columbus. The project was completed and dedicated in 1955 and the dam officially opened in 1958. It was named for two brothers, Charles P. Hoover and Clarence B. Hoover, to honor their careers with the City of Columbus Waterworks.

The dam's reservoir is a major water source for the city of Columbus. It holds 20.8 billion US gallons (79,000,000 m^{3}) of water and has a surface area of 3,272 acres (13.24 km^{2}), or about five square miles. The dam is 2,583 ft (787 m) long, including 680 ft (210 m) of spillway. It was constructed from 180,000 cubic feet (5,100 m^{3}) of concrete and 591,500 cubic feet (16,750 m^{3}) of earth.

The dam reaches a maximum height of 94 feet (29 m) above the stream bed, and is 911 feet (278 m) above sea level at its peak elevation. The uncontrolled spillway reaches a peak elevation of 890 feet (270 m) above sea level.

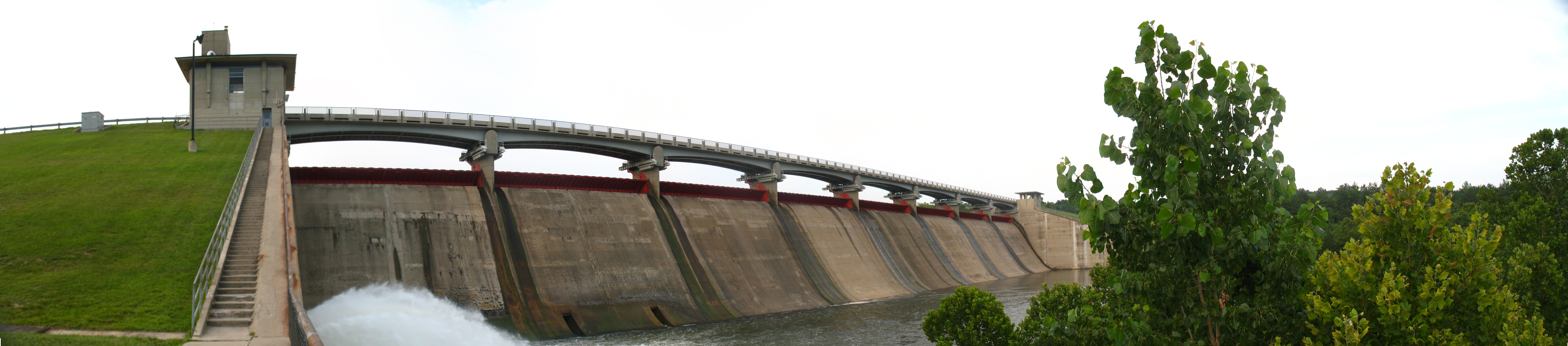
A panorama of the Hoover Dam in Westerville, Ohio

== Gallery ==
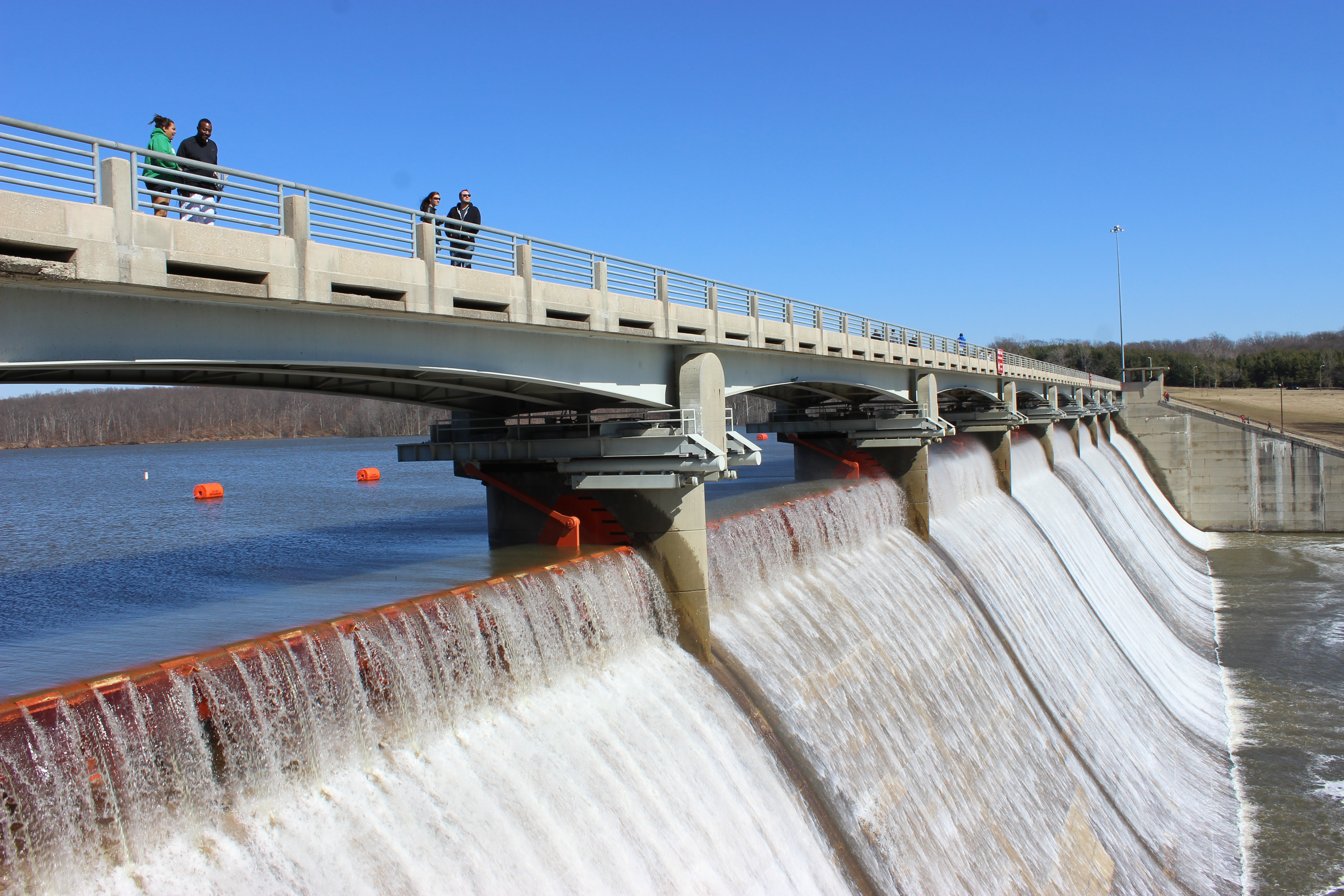
A view of the bridge and water flowing over the dam

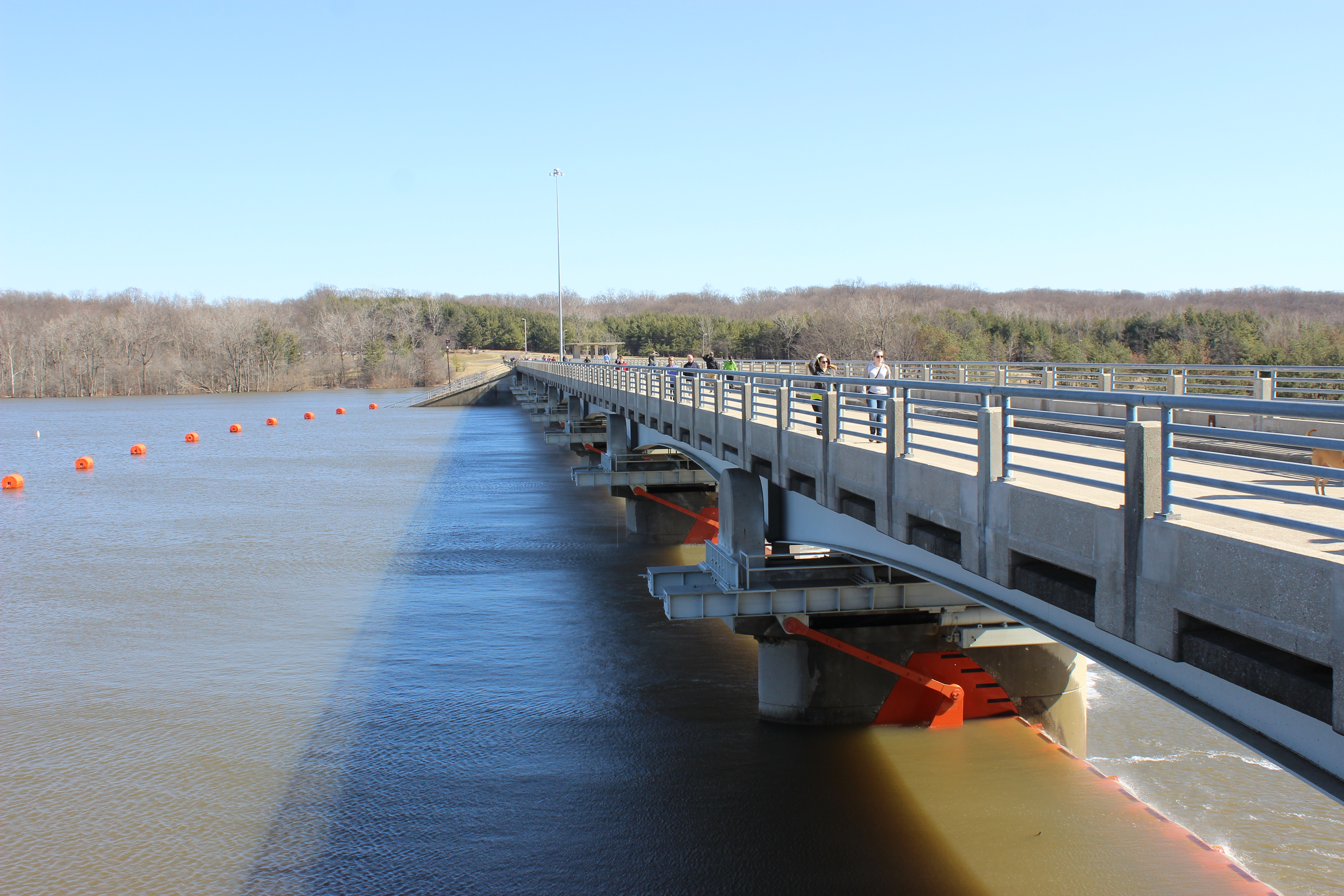
A view of the reservoir behind the dam

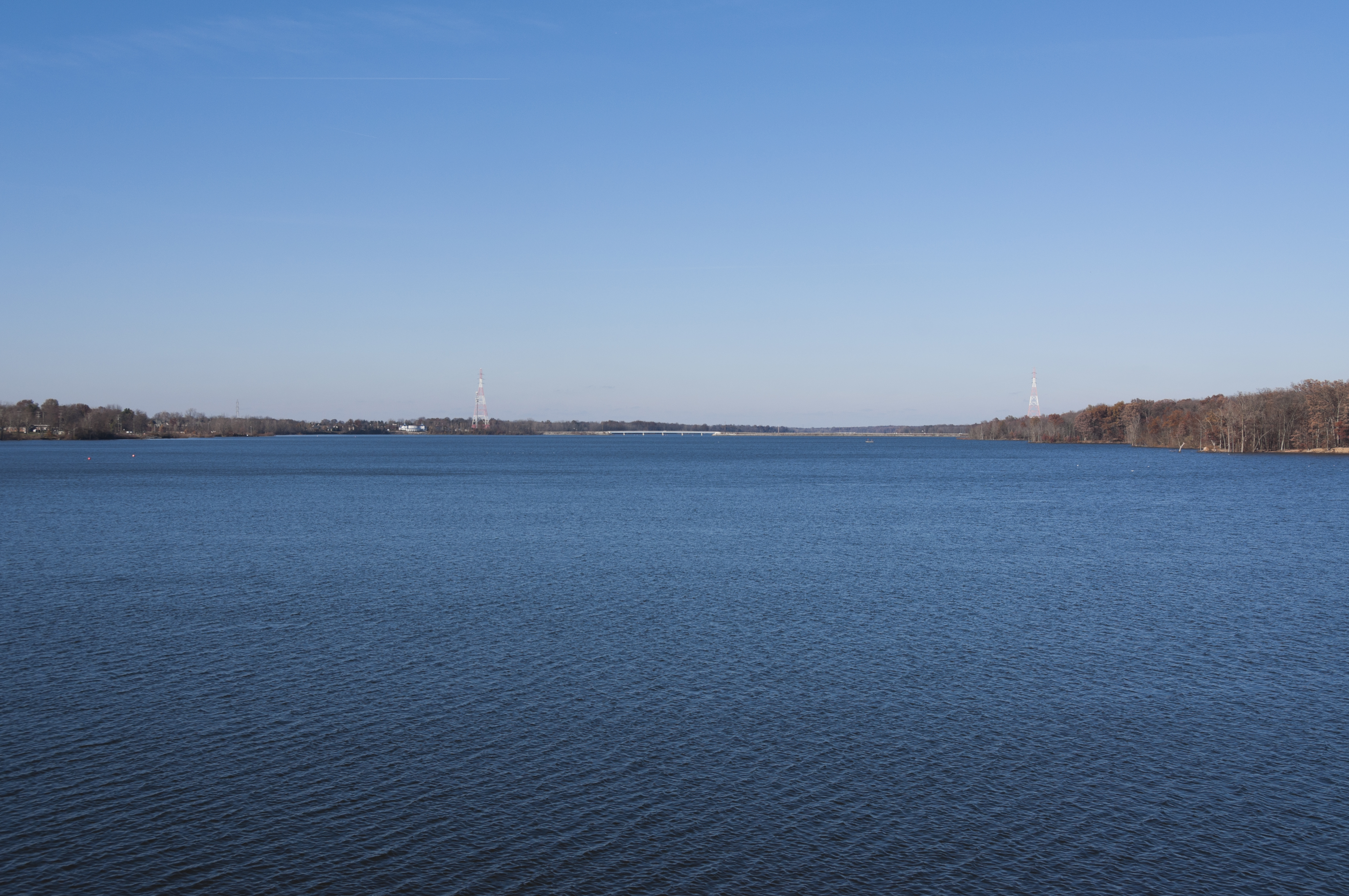
A view of the reservoir from on top of the dam

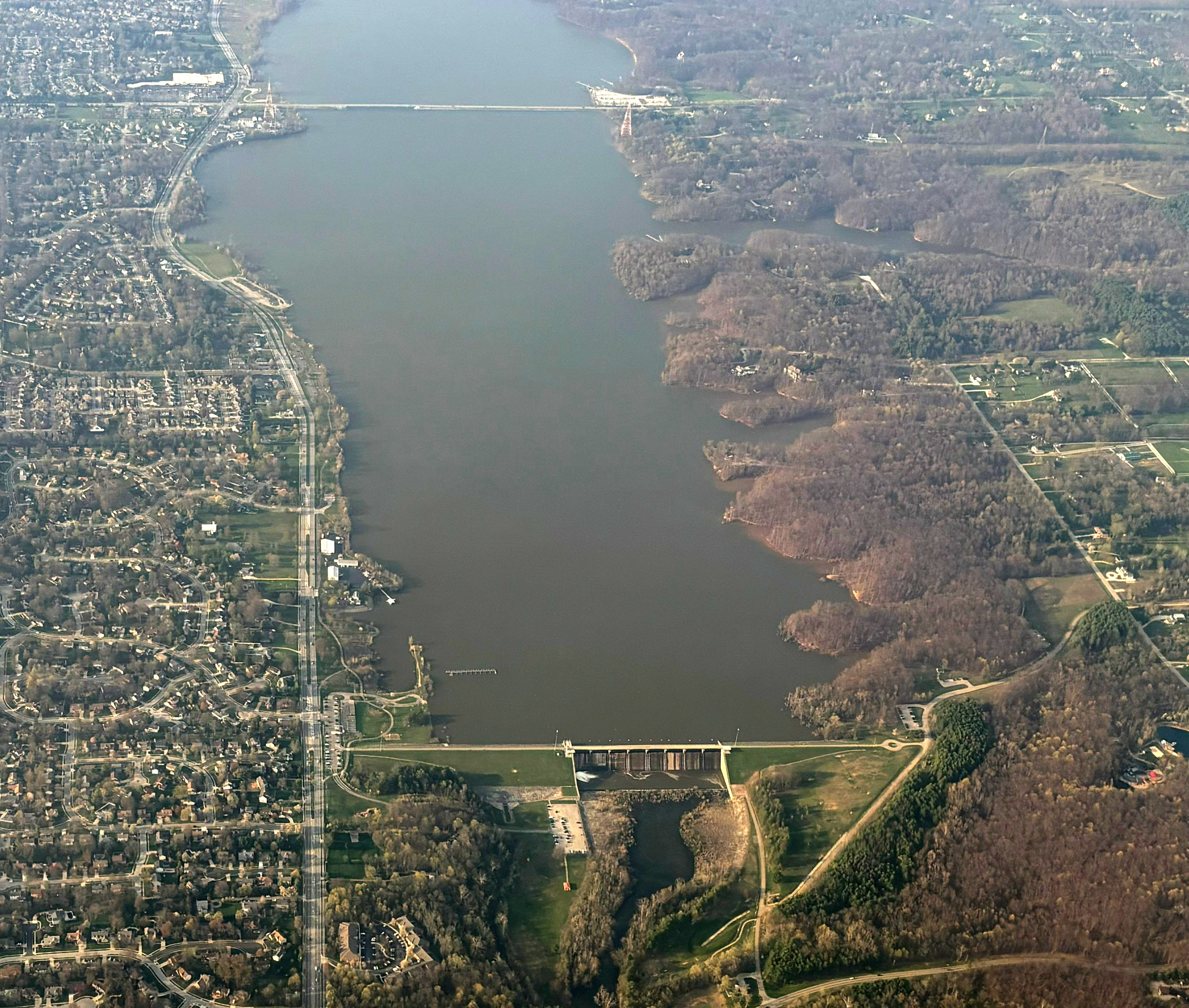
Hoover Dam Ohio aerial view
