= Claudette Woodard =

American politician

Member of the Ohio House of Representatives from the 9th district
- In office January 3, 2001-December 31, 2006
- Preceded by: Barbara Boyd
- Succeeded by: Barbara Boyd

Personal details
- Born: April 21, 1945 Cleveland, Ohio
- Died: February 26, 2010 (aged 64) Mentor, Ohio
- Party: Democratic

Claudette Johanne Woodard (April 21, 1945 – February 26, 2010) was a former Democratic member of the Ohio House of Representatives, representing the 9th District from 2001 to 2006.

She died in 2010, aged 64. She had vascular dementia.
