= Schleppi Run =

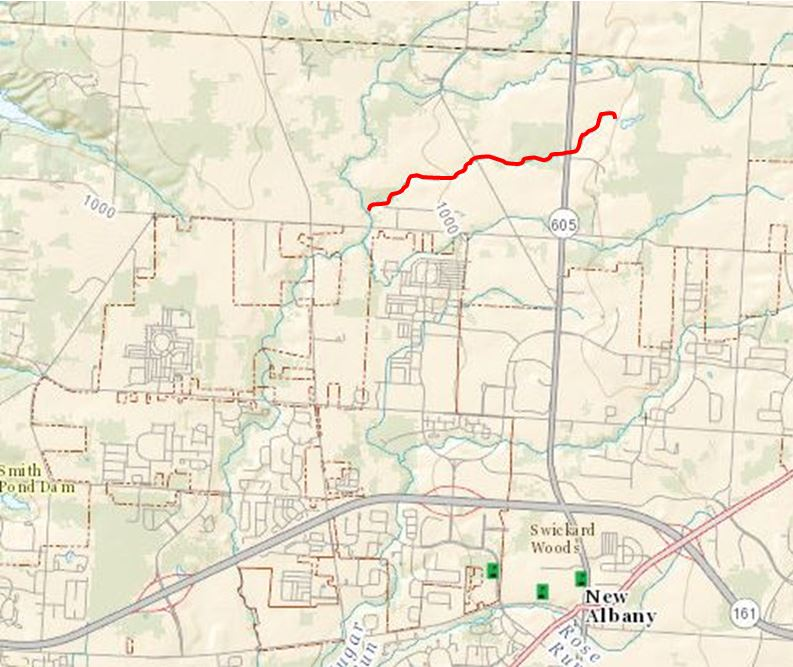
- Location of Schleppi Run in New Albany, Ohio

Location
- Country: United States

Physical characteristics
- Source
  - coordinates: 40°07′21″N 82°48′20″W
  - elevation: 978 ft (298 m)
- Mouth
  - coordinates: 40°06′54″N 82°49′55″W
- Length: 1.5 mi (2.4 km)

Schleppi Run is a tributary of the Rocky Fork Creek that flows through Franklin County, Ohio. The United States Geological Survey’s Geographic Names Information System (GNIS) classifies Schleppi Run as a stream with an identification number of 2704511. It was named after the homesteader Louis Schleppi which operated a 160 acre farm adjacent to East Walnut Road. The feature name was entered into the GNIS system in September 2011.

== Recreation ==
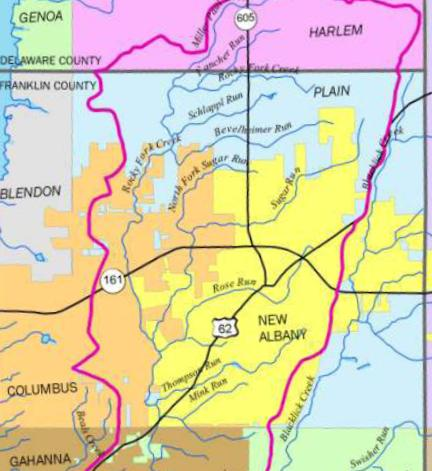
Rocky Fork Creek and associated tributaries

Schleppi Run transects the Rocky Fork Metro Park; a metropolitan park under the direction of the Columbus and Franklin County Metropolitan Park District (Metro Parks). The park is being developed by Metro Parks on more than 1,000 acres north of Walnut Street between Schott and Bevelhymer roads.

== See also ==
- New Albany, Ohio
- Metro Parks (Columbus, Ohio)
- List of rivers of Ohio
