= Barbara Boyd (Ohio politician) =

American politician (1942–2022)

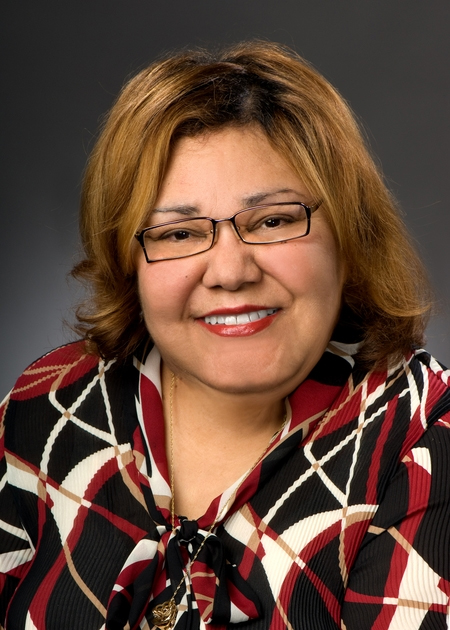

Member of the Ohio House of Representatives from the 9th district
- In office January 2, 2007 – December 31, 2014
- Preceded by: Claudette Woodard
- Succeeded by: Janine Boyd
- In office January 3, 1993 – December 31, 2000
- Preceded by: Judy Sheerer
- Succeeded by: Claudette Woodard

Personal details
- Born: April 24, 1942 Cleveland, Ohio, U.S.
- Died: November 5, 2022 (aged 80)
- Party: Democratic
- Spouse: Robert
- Education: Saint Paul's College

Barbara Boyd (April 24, 1942 – November 5, 2022) was an American politician. She served twice as a Democratic member of the Ohio House of Representatives, serving the 9th district from 2007 to 2014, and the same district from 1993 until 2000.

== Early life and education ==
Boyd was born in Cleveland and graduated from Saint Paul's College in Lawrenceville, Virginia.

== Career ==
Boyd worked on President Jimmy Carter's campaign as a start to politics. She became the first African American elected to Cleveland Heights City Council in 1983, where she would ultimately serve as mayor.

Boyd also worked with the Ohio Department of Job and Family Services, as well as with the Children's Defense Fund.

=== Ohio House of Representatives ===
Boyd was originally elected to the Ohio House of Representatives in 1992, and would be reelected three times after before term limits forced her into retirement. In 2001, she was succeeded by Claudette Woodard.

In 2006, Boyd was again eligible to run for her former House seat after sitting out for four years. She did so, and won with 83.66% of the vote. She won a second term in 2008 with 87.55% of the vote. With Democrats retaking control of the House, Boyd would serve as Chairperson of the Health Committee for the 128th Ohio General Assembly. Boyd was reelected to a third term in 2010 with 86% of the vote. She also served on the committee of Veteran's Affairs.

Boyd faced primary opposition in 2012 for her eighth term, but defeated challenger Howard Harris, securing 91.80% of the vote. She was unopposed in the general election. She was term-limited in 2014 and succeeded by her daughter, Janine Boyd.

== Personal life and death ==
Boyd died on November 5, 2022, at the age of 80.
