= Monroe Township, Licking County, Ohio =

Township in Ohio, US

- Township
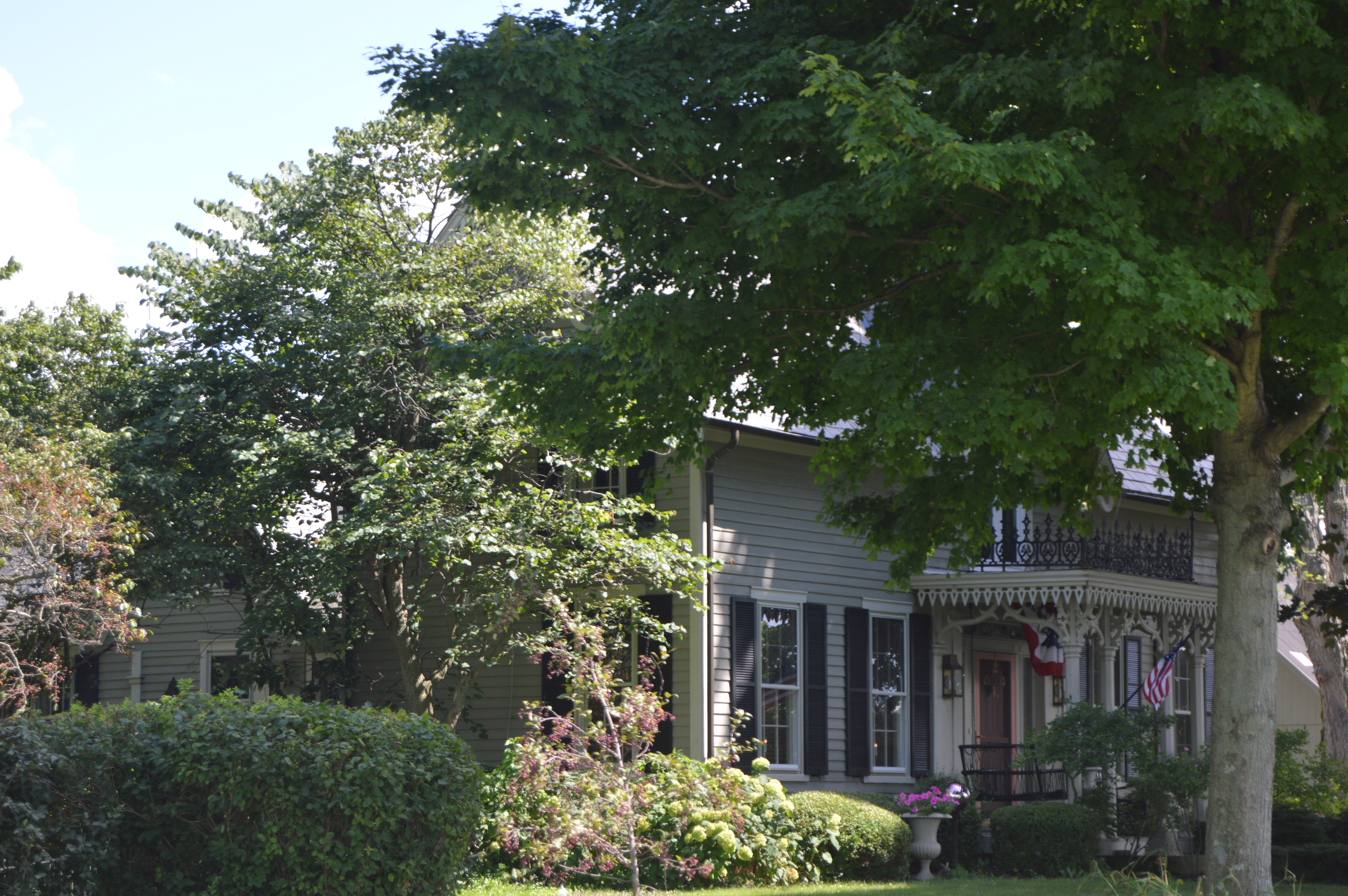
- The Lynnwood Farmhouse, south of Johnstown

- Location of Monroe Township in Licking County
- Coordinates: 40°9′21″N 82°41′16″W
- Country: United States
- State: Ohio
- County: Licking

Area
  - Total: 26.89 sq mi (69.65 km^{2})
  - Land: 26.81 sq mi (69.43 km^{2})
  - Water: 0.085 sq mi (0.22 km^{2})
- Elevation: 1,145 ft (349 m)

Population (2020)
  - Total: 7,753
  - Density: 289.2/sq mi (111.7/km^{2})
- Time zone: UTC-5 (Eastern (EST))
  - Summer (DST): UTC-4 (EDT)
- FIPS code: 39-51450
- GNIS feature ID: 1086472
- Website: monroetownship.org

Monroe Township is one of the 25 townships of Licking County, Ohio, United States. As of the 2020 census, the total population was 7,753.

== Geography ==
Located on the western edge of the county, it borders the following townships:

- Hartford Township - north
- Bennington Township - northeast corner
- Liberty Township - east
- St. Albans Township - southeast corner
- Jersey Township - south
- Plain Township, Franklin County - southwest corner
- Harlem Township, Delaware County - west
- Trenton Township, Delaware County - northwest corner

The village of Johnstown is located in eastern Monroe Township.

== Name and history ==
It is one of 22 Monroe Townships statewide.

== Government ==
The township is governed by a three-member board of trustees, who are elected in November of odd-numbered years to a four-year term beginning on the following January 1. Two are elected in the year after the presidential election and one is elected in the year before it. There is also an elected township fiscal officer, who serves a four-year term beginning on April 1 of the year after the election, which is held in November of the year before the presidential election. Vacancies in the fiscal officership or on the board of trustees are filled by the remaining trustees.
