= Bishara Addison =

American politician

Member of the Ohio House of Representatives from the 9th District
- In office May 18, 2022 – December 31, 2022
- Preceded by: Janine Boyd
- Succeeded by: Munira Abdullahi

Personal details
- Party: Democratic
- Education: George Washington University; Georgetown University

Bishara Addison is an American politician who served in the Ohio House of Representatives from Ohio's 9th district. She was appointed to the seat after incumbent Democrat Janine Boyd was appointed as a regional director of the United States Department of Health and Human Services, to complete Boyd's remaining term. She did not run for election to a full term in 2022.
