= Janine Boyd =

American politician (born 1971)

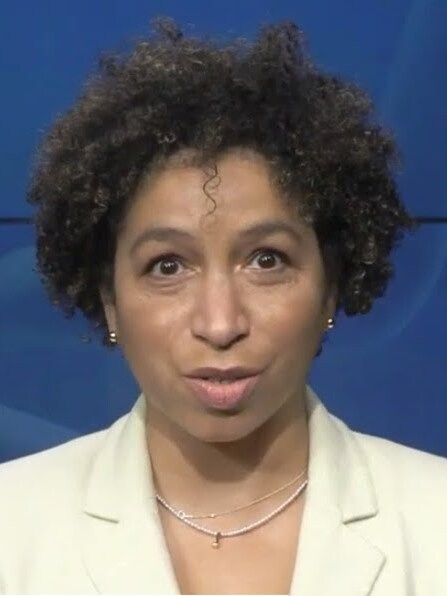
- Boyd in 2022

Member of the Cleveland Heights City Council
- In office February 10, 2023 – March 18, 2024
- Preceded by: Mary Dunbar
- Succeeded by: Jim Posch

Regional Director of the United States Department of Health and Human Services for Region 5
- In office April 8, 2022 – 2022
- Appointed by: Joe Biden
- Preceded by: Doug O'Brien
- Succeeded by: Michael Cabonargi

Member of the Ohio House of Representatives from the 9th district
- In office January 6, 2015 – April 22, 2022
- Preceded by: Barbara Boyd
- Succeeded by: Bishara Addison

Personal details
- Born: February 5, 1971 (age 55)
- Party: Democratic
- Relations: Barbara Boyd (mother)
- Education: Hillsdale College (BA); Michigan State University (MA)

Janine Boyd (born February 5, 1971) is an American politician who served as a member of the Ohio House of Representatives for the 9th district from 2015 to 2022. She resigned from her House seat in April 2022 to take a position in the United States Department of Health and Human Services. She later served on the city council of Cleveland Heights.

== Early life and education ==
A native of Cleveland Heights, Ohio, Boyd graduated from the Beaumont School. She earned a Bachelor of Arts degree in Spanish from Hillsdale College in 1993 and a Master of Arts in speech and language pathology from Michigan State University in 1999. Boyd is the daughter of Barbara Boyd, who held the same seat from 1993 to 2000 and from 2007 to 2014.

== Career ==
Boyd previously served on council for Cleveland Heights, where she often faced criticism for her attendance. In 2012, she was appointed to council to replace Phyllis Evans. In 2014, she announced that she would seek to replace her mother, Barbara Boyd, in the Ohio House of Representatives. She faced Republican Charles Hopson in the general election, and went on to win 85%-15%.

During debate on an Ohio six-week abortion ban, banning abortion after detection of a "fetal heartbeat", Boyd drafted an amendment that would give an exemption to African American women, "whose history includes rape and forced birth imposed on enslaved women and black women after slavery". The amendment failed, and the bill was signed into law. A federal judge issued an injunction against the bill before it took effect.

In April 2022, Boyd was appointed by President Joe Biden to serve as a regional director of the United States Department of Health and Human Services for the fifth region, which covers Illinois, Indiana, Michigan, Minnesota, Ohio, and Wisconsin.

In late 2022, Boyd left the HHS to care for her ailing mother in Cleveland Heights. Her mother died in November 2022. In February 2023, City of Cleveland Heights Mayor Kahlil Seren appointed Boyd "to fill the vacant, unexpired term on Cleveland Heights City Council ending 12/31/2023." She was elected in November 2023 to serve a full four-year term, but resigned on March 18, 2024 in order to relocate her family. In April 2024, Jim Posch was appointed to fill the seat she had held.
