= Hartford Township, Licking County, Ohio =

Township in Ohio, US

- Township
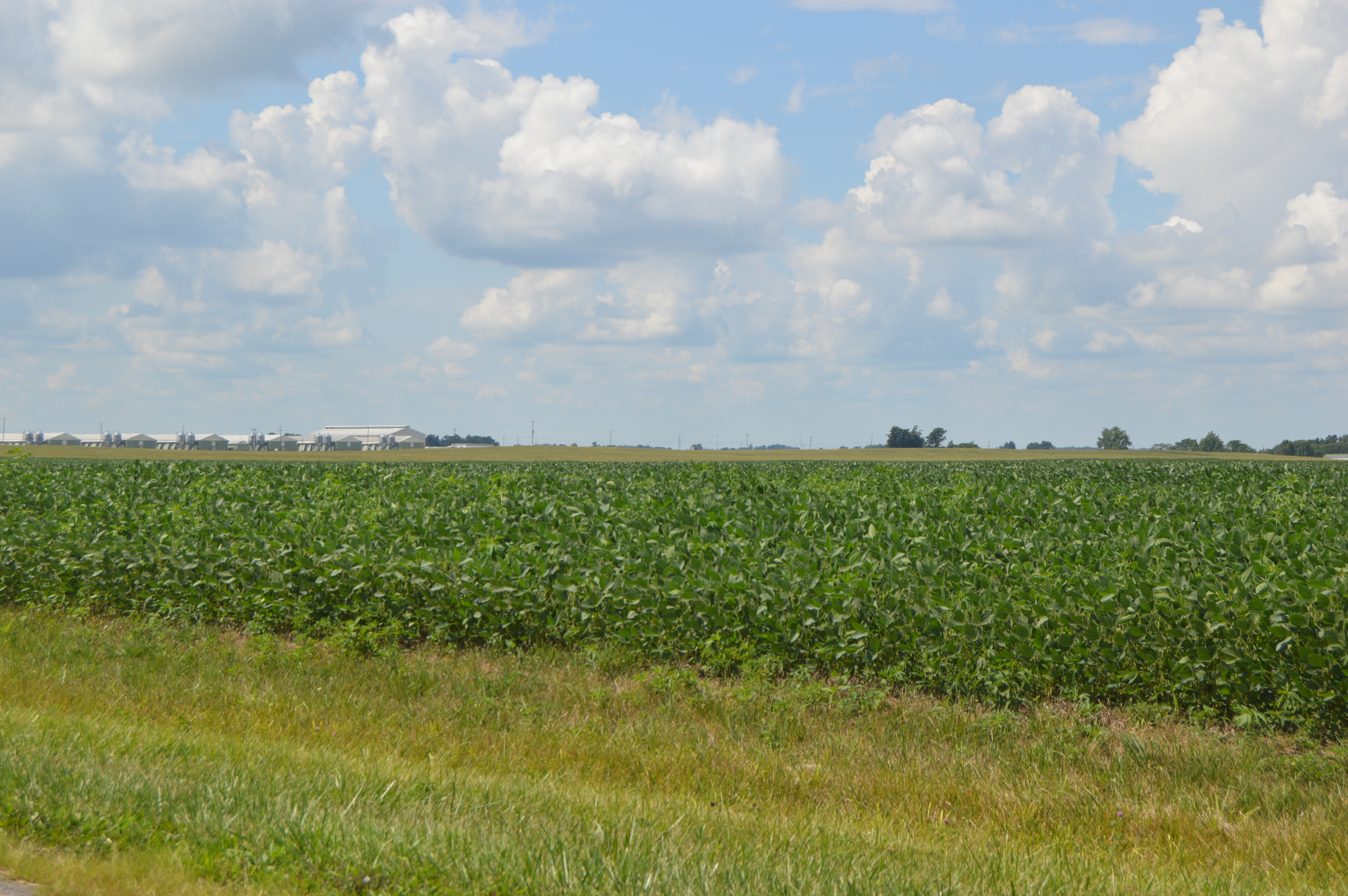
- Fields south of Hartford

- Location in Licking County
- Coordinates: 40°14′10″N 82°42′0″W
- Country: United States
- State: Ohio
- County: Licking

Area
  - Total: 27.6 sq mi (71.6 km^{2})
  - Land: 27.6 sq mi (71.5 km^{2})
  - Water: 0.039 sq mi (0.1 km^{2})
- Elevation: 1,168 ft (356 m)

Population (2020)
  - Total: 1,433
  - Density: 51.9/sq mi (20.0/km^{2})
- Time zone: UTC-5 (Eastern (EST))
  - Summer (DST): UTC-4 (EDT)
- FIPS code: 39-34188
- GNIS feature ID: 1086462
- Website: hartfordtownship.net

Hartford Township is one of the 25 townships of Licking County, Ohio, United States. As of the 2020 census the population was 1,433.

== Geography ==
Located in the northwestern corner of the county, it borders the following townships:

- Hilliar Township, Knox County - north
- Milford Township, Knox County - northeast corner
- Bennington Township - east
- Liberty Township - southeast corner
- Monroe Township - south
- Harlem Township, Delaware County - southwest corner
- Trenton Township, Delaware County - west
- Porter Township, Delaware County - northwest corner

The village of Hartford is located in the center of the township.

== Name and history ==
Statewide, the only other Hartford Township is located in Trumbull County.

== Government ==
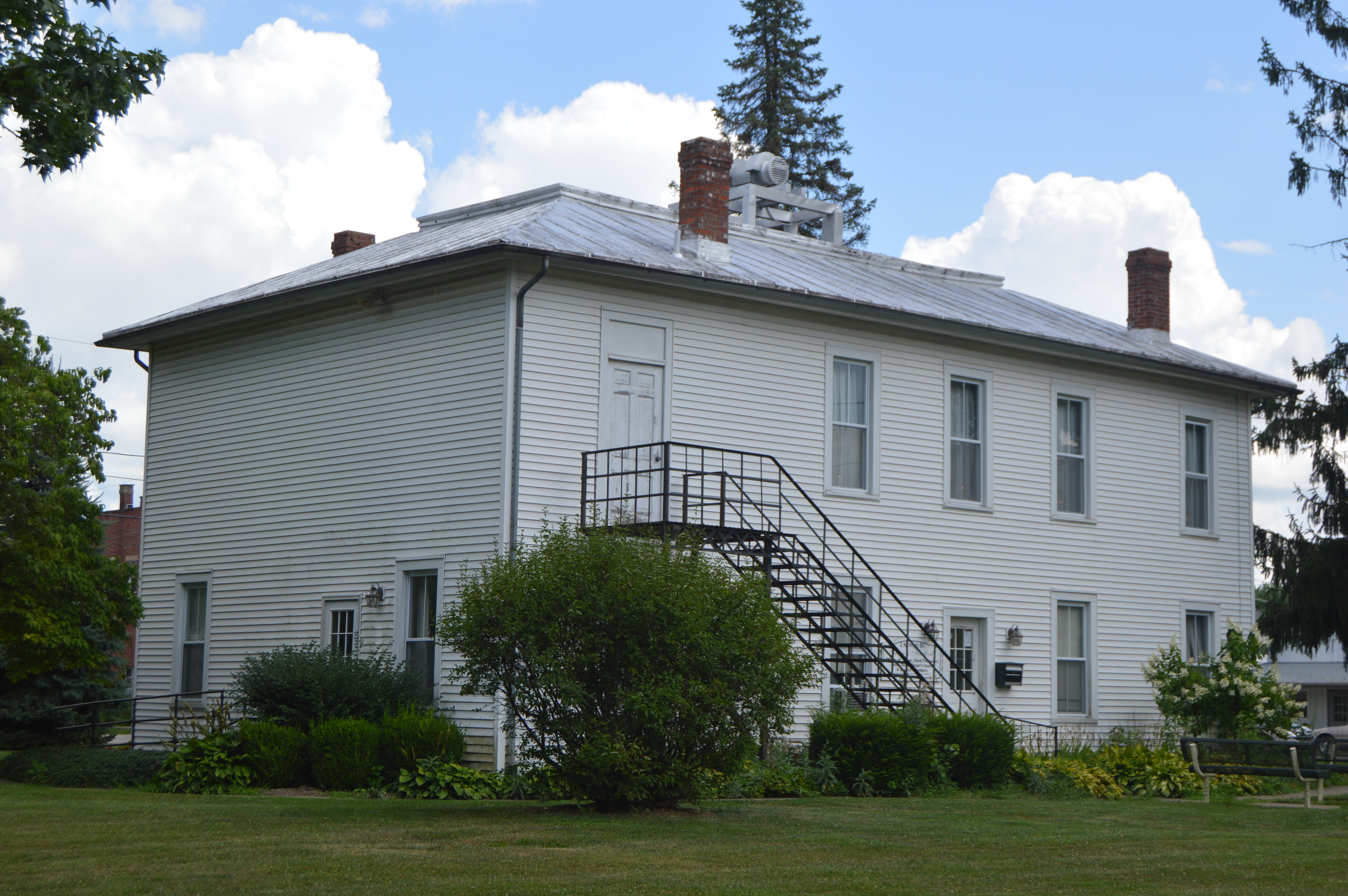
Hartford town hall

The township is governed by a three-member board of trustees, who are elected in November of odd-numbered years to a four-year term beginning on the following January 1. Two are elected in the year after the presidential election and one is elected in the year before it. There is also an elected township fiscal officer, who serves a four-year term beginning on April 1 of the year after the election, which is held in November of the year before the presidential election. Vacancies in the fiscal officership or on the board of trustees are filled by the remaining trustees.
