= Blendon Township, Ohio =

Township in Ohio, US

Blendon Township, Franklin County, Ohio
- Township
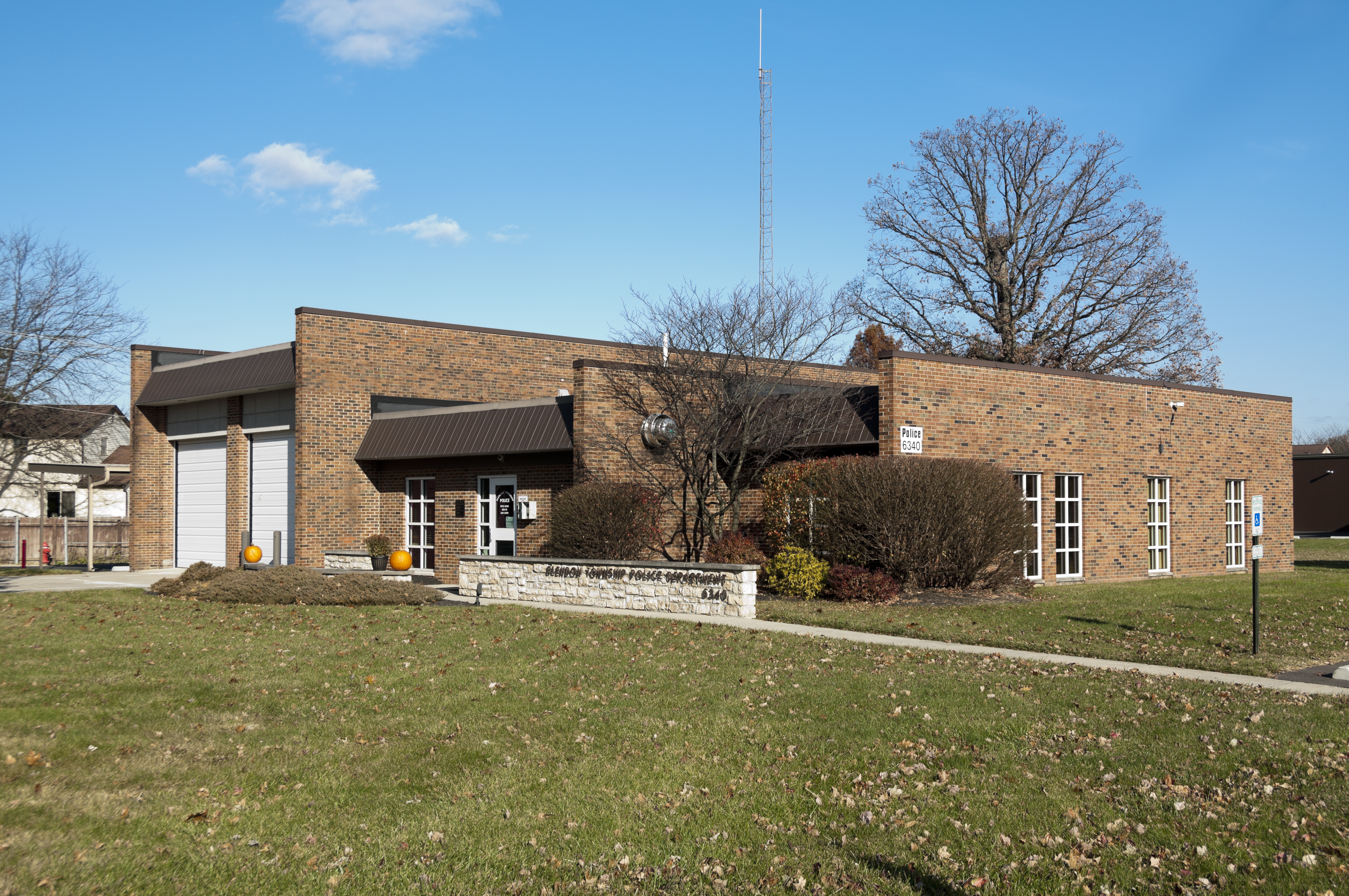
- Blendon Township Police Headquarters

- Flag

- Location of Blendon Township in Franklin County.
- Coordinates: 40°4′54″N 82°55′1″W
- Country: United States
- State: Ohio
- County: Franklin

Area
  - Total: 6.8 sq mi (18 km^{2})
  - Land: 5.9 sq mi (15 km^{2})
  - Water: 0.9 sq mi (2.3 km^{2})
- Elevation: 840 ft (256 m)

Population (2020)
  - Total: 10,152
  - Density: 1,700/sq mi (660/km^{2})
- Time zone: UTC-5 (Eastern (EST))
  - Summer (DST): UTC-4 (EDT)
- FIPS code: 39-06922
- GNIS feature ID: 1086098
- Website: www.blendontwp.org

Blendon Township is one of the seventeen townships of Franklin County, Ohio, United States. The 2020 census found 10,152 people in the township.

== Geography ==
Located in the northeastern part of the county, the township has been reduced by municipal annexations to three large "islands" and many small ones. They have the following borders:

- The small islands are surrounded by Columbus.
- The southwestern large island borders Minerva Park to the north and west, and Columbus to the east and south.
- The central large island borders Westerville to the north, and Columbus to the east, south, and west.
- The northern large island borders Harlem Township, Delaware County to the north, Plain Township to the east, Columbus to the south, Westerville to the west, and Genoa Township, Delaware County to the northwest.

Much of what was once Blendon Township has since been annexed by certain municipalities:

- The city of Columbus, the county seat of Franklin County, in the south
- The village of Minerva Park, in the southwest
- The city of Westerville, in the northwest

Part of western Blendon Township is occupied by the census-designated place of Huber Ridge.

== Name and history ==
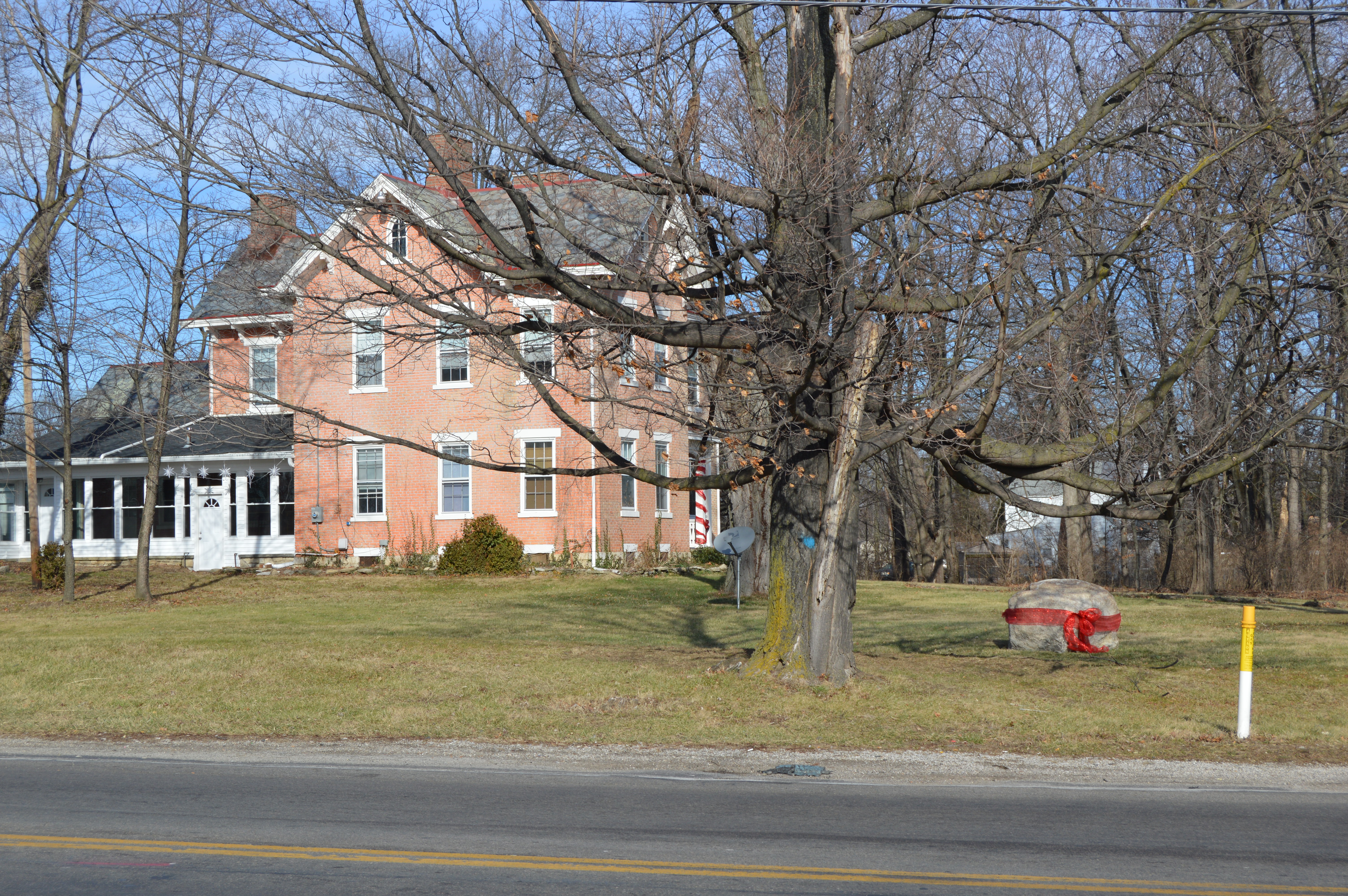
Prehistoric Jackson Fort

It is the only Blendon Township statewide.

Blendon Township was originally known as Harrison Township when it was organized in 1815. It received its present name of Blendon Township in 1824.

== Government ==
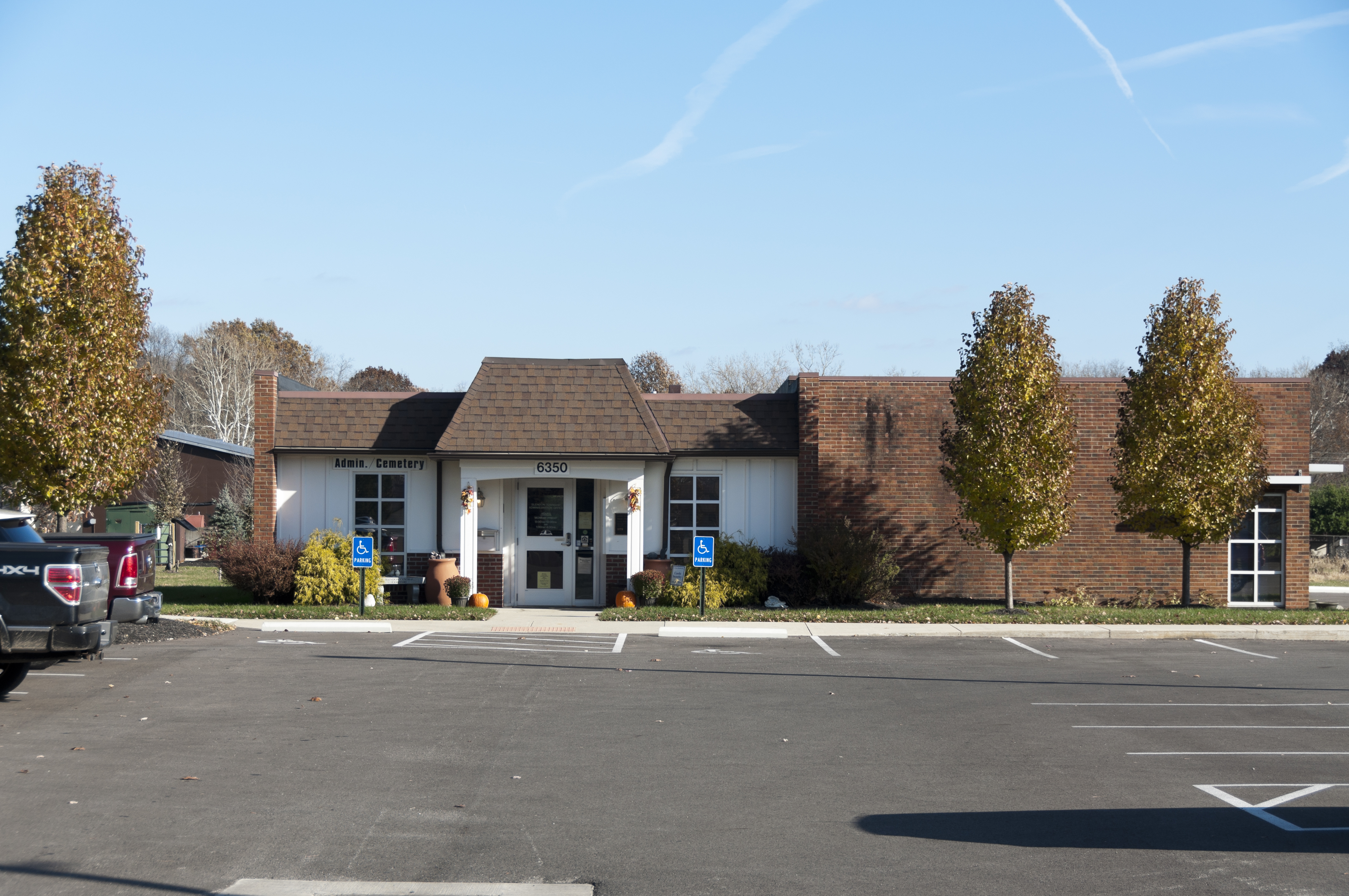
Blendon Township Administration Building

The township is governed by a three-member board of trustees, who are elected in November of odd-numbered years to a four-year term beginning on the following January 1. Two are elected in the year after the presidential election and one is elected in the year before it. There is also an elected township fiscal officer, who serves a four-year term beginning on April 1 of the year after the election, which is held in November of the year before the presidential election. Vacancies in the fiscal officership or on the board of trustees are filled by the remaining trustees.

== Economy ==
Kroger operates its Columbus regional offices at 4111 Executive Parkway in the township.
