= Blacklick, Ohio =

- Unincorporated community
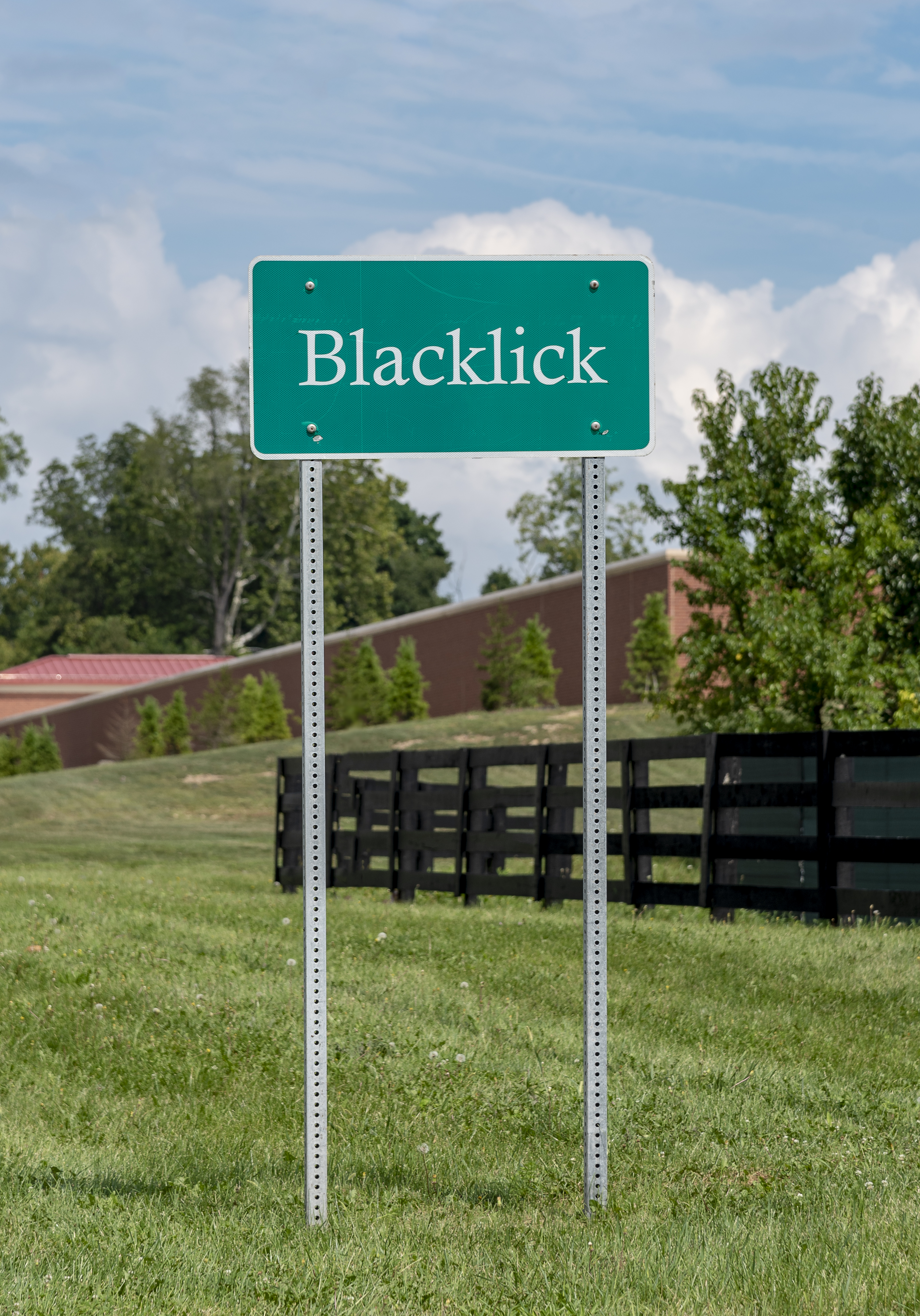

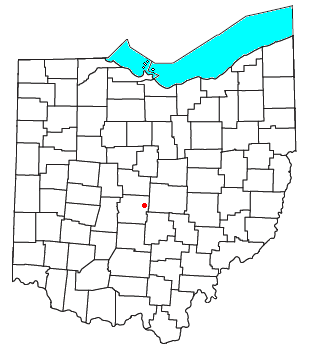
- Location of Blacklick, Ohio
- Coordinates: 39°59′44″N 82°48′41″W
- Country: United States
- State: Ohio
- County: Franklin
- Township: Jefferson
- Established: 1852
- Elevation: 955 ft (291 m)
- Time zone: UTC-5 (Eastern (EST))
  - Summer (DST): UTC-4 (EDT)
- ZIP codes: 43004
- GNIS feature ID: 1064445

Blacklick is a small unincorporated community in southern Jefferson Township, Franklin County, Ohio, United States. Blacklick is also included in the Columbus Metropolitan area.

== History ==
The community was established by William A. Smith in 1852. It was originally named Smithville, but there was an existing town by that name so it was renamed to Blacklick after the nearby creek.

It was thought by historian W. Edson Richmond that Blacklick Creek derived its name from local landowner H. G. Black. However, Richmond references John F. Mansfield's Map of the State of Ohio from 1806 which labels Blacklick Creek, while Henry George Black was not born until 1817.

== Geography ==
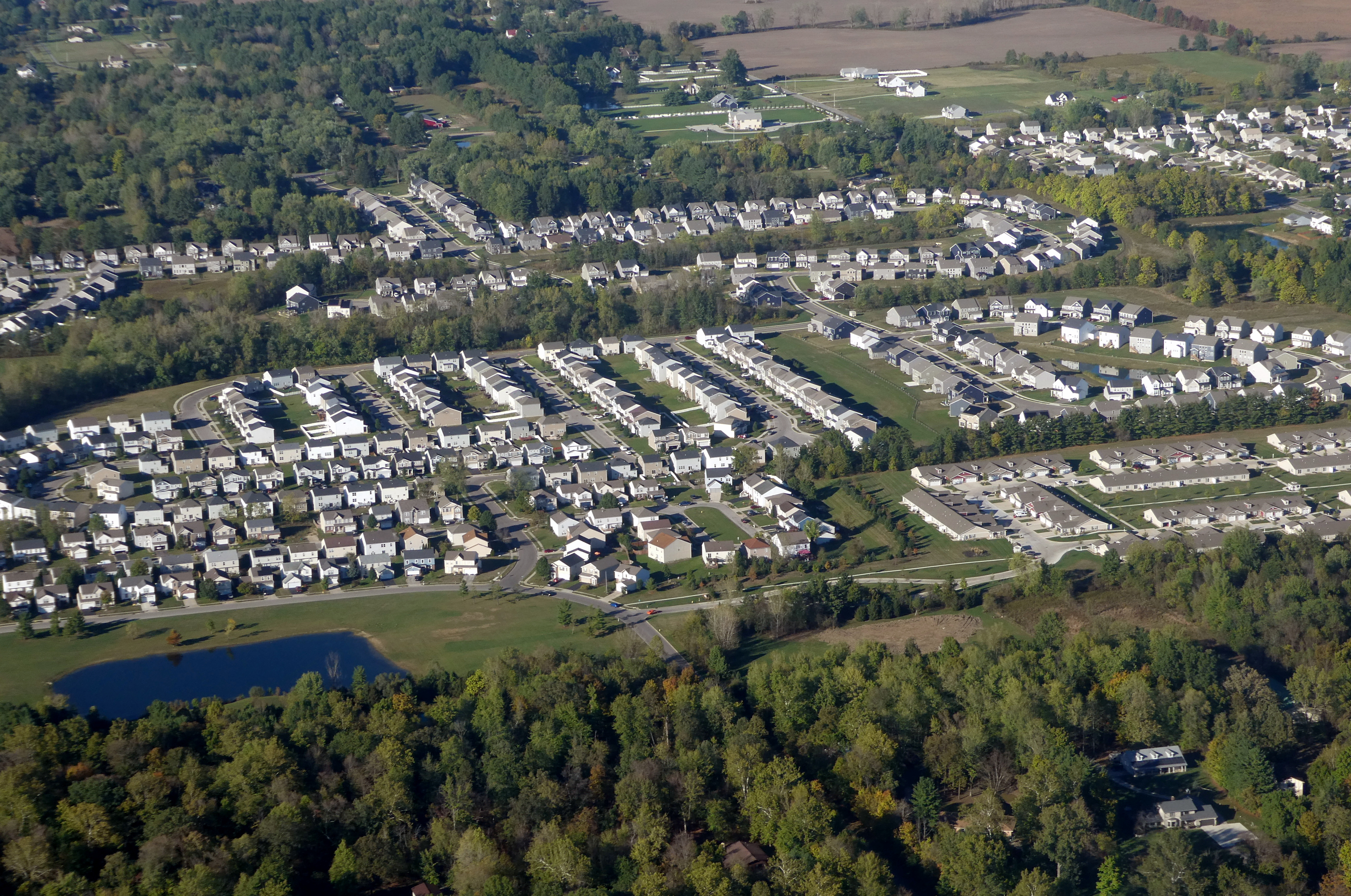
Aerial view of a housing development

Blacklick Creek flows through Blacklick.

The Blacklick Post Office (zip code 43004) used to be within the community, but has moved just south of the community on Reynoldsburg-New Albany Road.

Blacklick is the site of Jefferson Cemetery, an active cemetery operated by Jefferson Township.

=== Climate ===
Humid continental climate is a climatic region typified by large seasonal temperature differences, with warm to hot (and often humid) summers and cold (sometimes severely cold) winters. The Köppen Climate Classification subtype for this climate is "Dfa" (Hot Summer Continental Climate).

== Education ==
The community has no school district, but is split into five school districts: Columbus City Schools in Columbus, Gahanna Jefferson City Schools in Gahanna, Licking Heights Local School District in Pataskala, New Albany-Plain Local School District in New Albany, and Reynoldsburg City Schools in Reynoldsburg. Private school(s) include Grace Christian School, a K-8 school founded in 1981.
