= ESchoolView =

eSchoolView
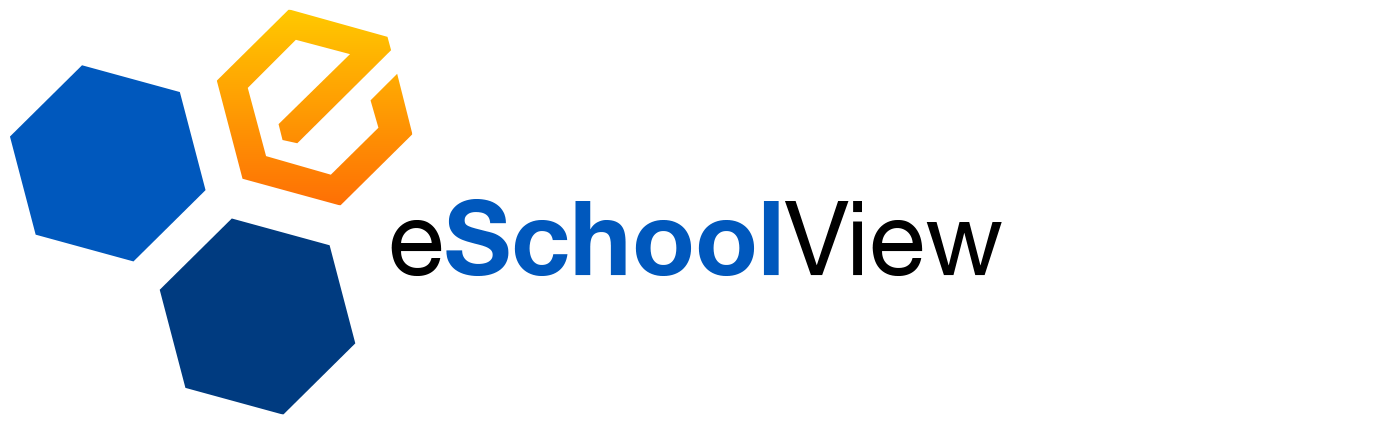
- Type: Private
- Industry: Web hosting
- Founded: 2008
- Founders: Rob O’Leary and Grant Wright
- Headquarters: Columbus, Ohio
- Area served: United States
- Products: Web design, CMS platforms for schools
- Services: Digital tools for educational institutions
- Website: www.eschoolview.com

eSchoolView was a content management system provider and website developer based in Columbus, Ohio. The company was founded in 2008 by Rob O'Leary and Grant Wright and focused on building websites and digital tools for educational institutions. Rob O’Leary and Grant Wright founded eSchoolView in 2008.

== History ==
eSchoolView was founded in 2008 by Rob O'Leary and Grant Wright in Columbus, Ohio. The company developed website and content management solutions primarily for public, private, and charter school institutions.

By 2013, the company had begun expanding its community and educational initiatives. In December of that year, eSchoolView launched its own "Investing in Our Future" scholarship program for high school seniors and pleged $35,000 toward student scholarships.

In 2014, eSchoolView continued to expand its product offerings and geographic reach, launching its first customized website for a school in Iowa, and partnering with Hannah Ashton Middle School in Reynoldsburg, Ohio to create a coding class for eighth grade students. Later that year, eSchoolView was listed on District Administration’s “Readers' Choice Top 100 Products.” and was serving over 200 Ohio school districts and 1,300 educational organizations across 31 states.

The company was listed as No. 1409 on Inc. Magazine's Inc. 5000 index of fastest growing U.S. companies in 2014. In 2015, eSchooView's was again recognized and named 1907 on Inc. Magazine's 5000 list. In October 2015, eSchoolView was featured in District Administration magazine as a provider of K-12 website providers.
