= Jefferson Township, Franklin County, Ohio =

Township in Ohio, US

- Township
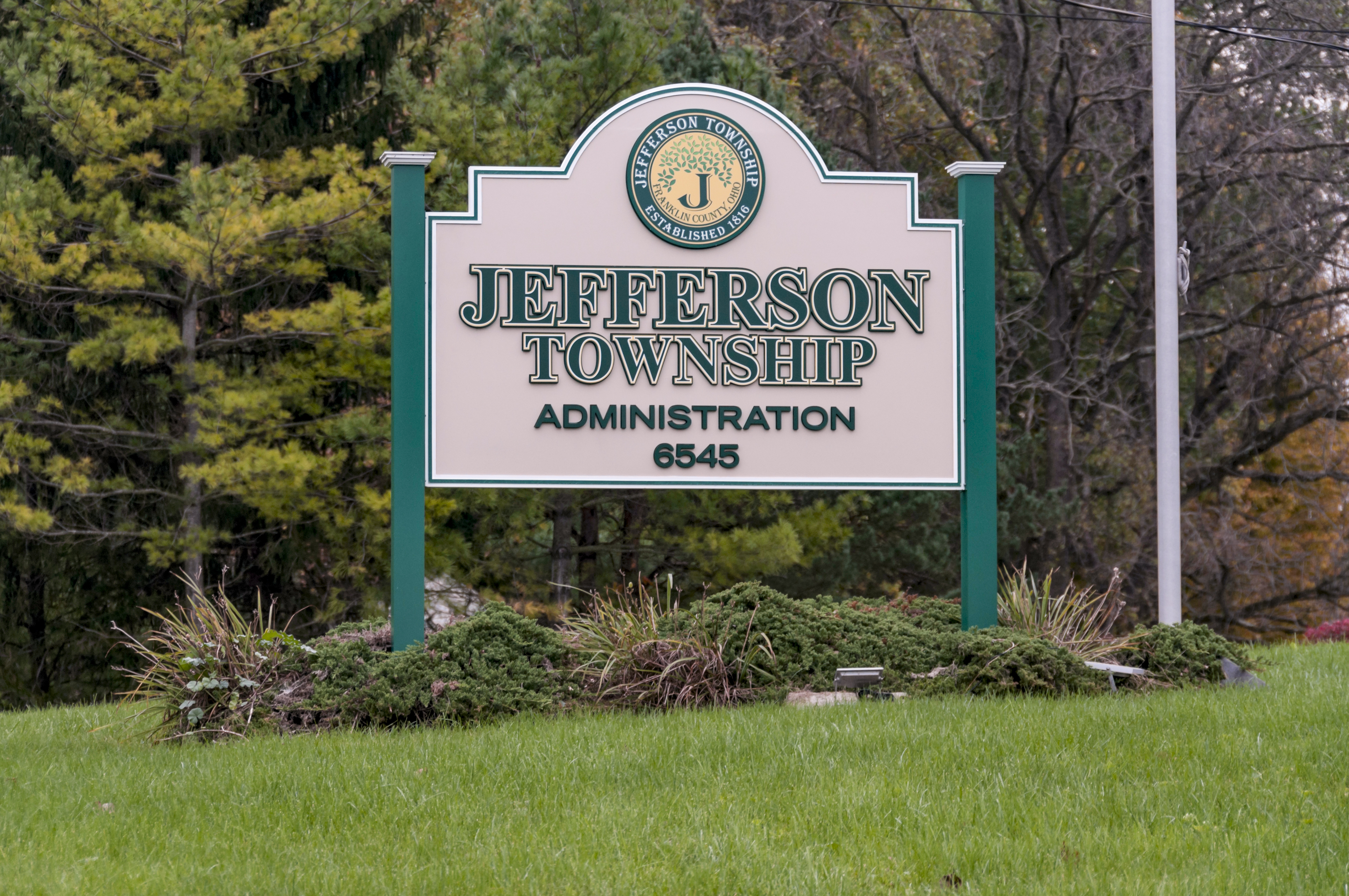

- Location of Jefferson Township in Franklin County.
- Coordinates: 40°0′23″N 82°48′32″W
- Country: United States
- State: Ohio
- County: Franklin

Area
  - Total: 15.1 sq mi (39 km^{2})
  - Land: 14.9 sq mi (39 km^{2})
  - Water: 0.2 sq mi (0.52 km^{2})
- Elevation: 948 ft (289 m)

Population (2020)
  - Total: 14,475
  - Density: 971/sq mi (375/km^{2})
- Time zone: UTC-5 (Eastern (EST))
  - Summer (DST): UTC-4 (EDT)
- FIPS code: 39-38612
- GNIS feature ID: 1086106
- Website: Township website

Jefferson Township is situated on the northeast edge of Franklin County, Ohio as a part of the Columbus metropolitan area and situated between the Blacklick Creek, Big Walnut Creek and Swisher Creek watershed. The township is one of the seventeen townships of Franklin County, Ohio, United States. The 2020 census found 14,475 people in the township. It was established on September 6, 1816.

== Geography ==
Located in the eastern part of the county, Jefferson Township consists of a large section and many small "islands". Most of these islands are surrounded by either Gahanna or Columbus, cities that have annexed most of the western and southern parts of the township. The large section borders the following townships and cities:

- Plain Township – north
- Jersey Township, Licking County – northeast corner
- Pataskala – east
- New Albany – northwest
- Reynoldsburg – south

Besides Gahanna and Columbus, the unincorporated community of Blacklick lies in the southern part of the township.

Blacklick Creek and its associated tributaries of its watershed such as Swisher Creek flow through Jefferson Township. Big Walnut Creek is also to the west of the township while some of its tributaries such as Rocky Fork Creek travel through the western part of Jefferson Township. This has caused the topography in the township to be more varied than some of the surrounding areas from the resulting stream corridors, hills, ravines, and slopes, much of it associated with the waterways, tributaries, and floodplain that Jefferson Township is in from Rocky Fork, Blacklick, and Swisher Creeks

=== Climate ===
The Köppen Climate Classification subtype for this climate is "Dfa" (Hot Summer Continental Climate). This climate type is assessed as a Humid continental climate, which is a climatic region typified by large seasonal temperature differences, with warm to hot (and sometimes humid) summers and cold (sometimes severely cold) winters.

== Name and history ==
The area of the Scioto River, Olentangy River watershed, south to the Ohio River area have been inhabited by the Adena people more than 2000 years ago. Two earthworks from mound builders cultures have been found in Jefferson Township and new ones continue to be found in the area around the township to this day.

The first settlement in what became Jefferson Township by settlers of European descent was established in 1802 or 1803 after beneficiaries of land grants for service in the Revolutionary War began to occupy and farm the area. Jefferson Township was established on September 6, 1816. In 1840, Jefferson Township contained 1,040 inhabitants. By 1850, it had only grown to 1,236. It is one of twenty-four Jefferson Townships statewide.

In 2003 Jefferson Township was granted Ohio Scenic Byway status by ODOT and the township actively manages and protects the historic character of the 15 miles of the Jefferson Township Scenic Byways corridor. The most recent management plan was done in 2015.

== Government ==
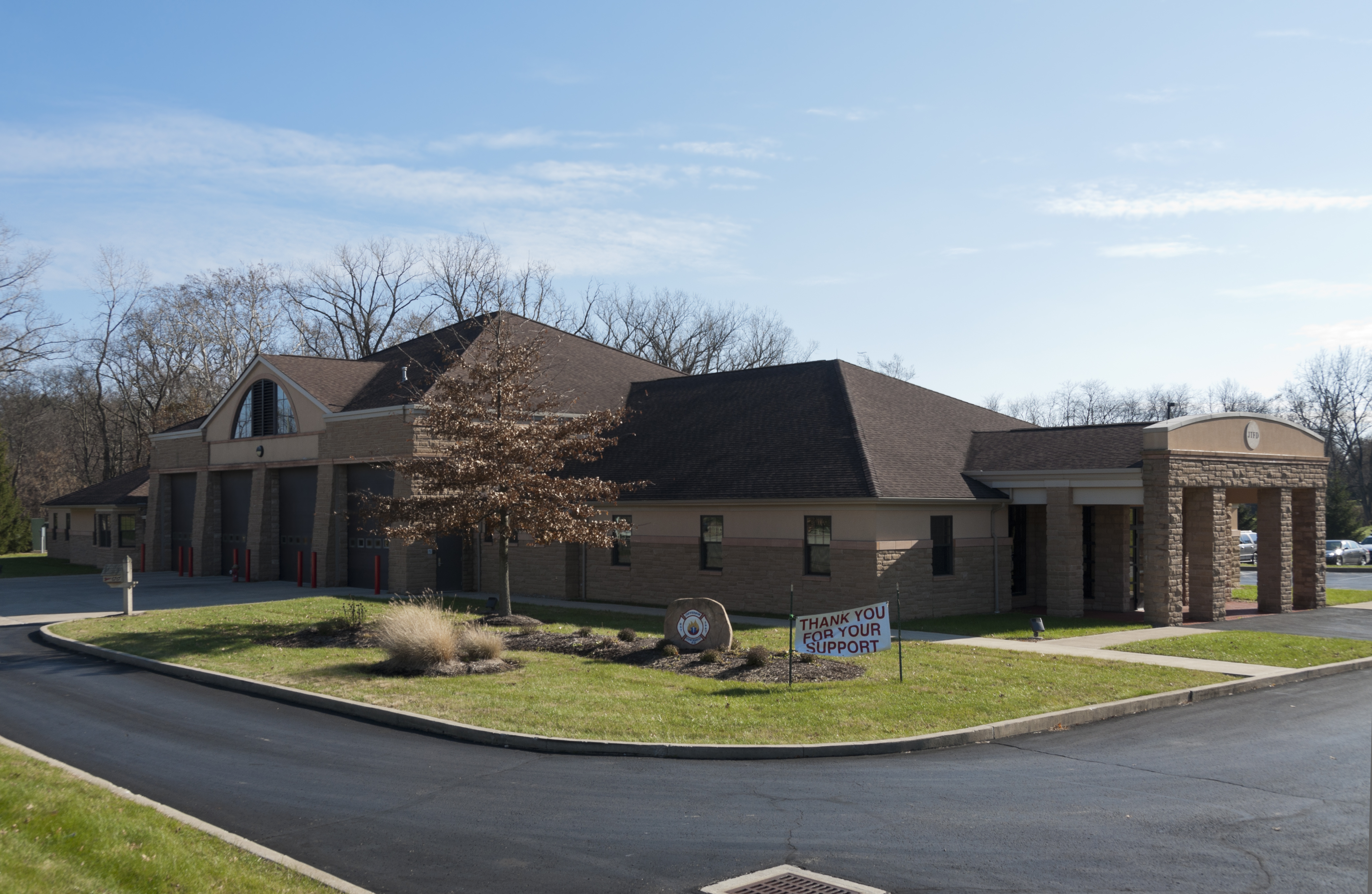
Municipal Building and Fire Department Headquarters

The township is governed by a three-member board of trustees, who are elected in November of odd-numbered years to a four-year term beginning on the following January 1. Two are elected in the year after the presidential election and one is elected in the year before it. There is also an elected township fiscal officer, who serves a four-year term beginning on April 1 of the year after the election, which is held in November of the year before the presidential election. Vacancies in the fiscal officership or on the board of trustees are filled by the remaining trustees.

Jefferson Township established its own Water and Sewer district independent of Franklin County, Columbus or Gahanna, unlike most townships locally. Jefferson Water and Sewer District or JWSD was created in 1987.

The majority of the township is in the Gahanna-Jefferson Public School District with some additional parts in the boundaries of Columbus, Licking Heights, and Reynoldsburg Unified School Districts as well.

Jefferson Township is split between the US Congressional Districts: OH-3, OH-12. It is in Ohio's 3rd senatorial district, and its Ohio State House Districts are OH-19 and OH-20.
