= Camaron Cheeseman =

American football player (born 1998)

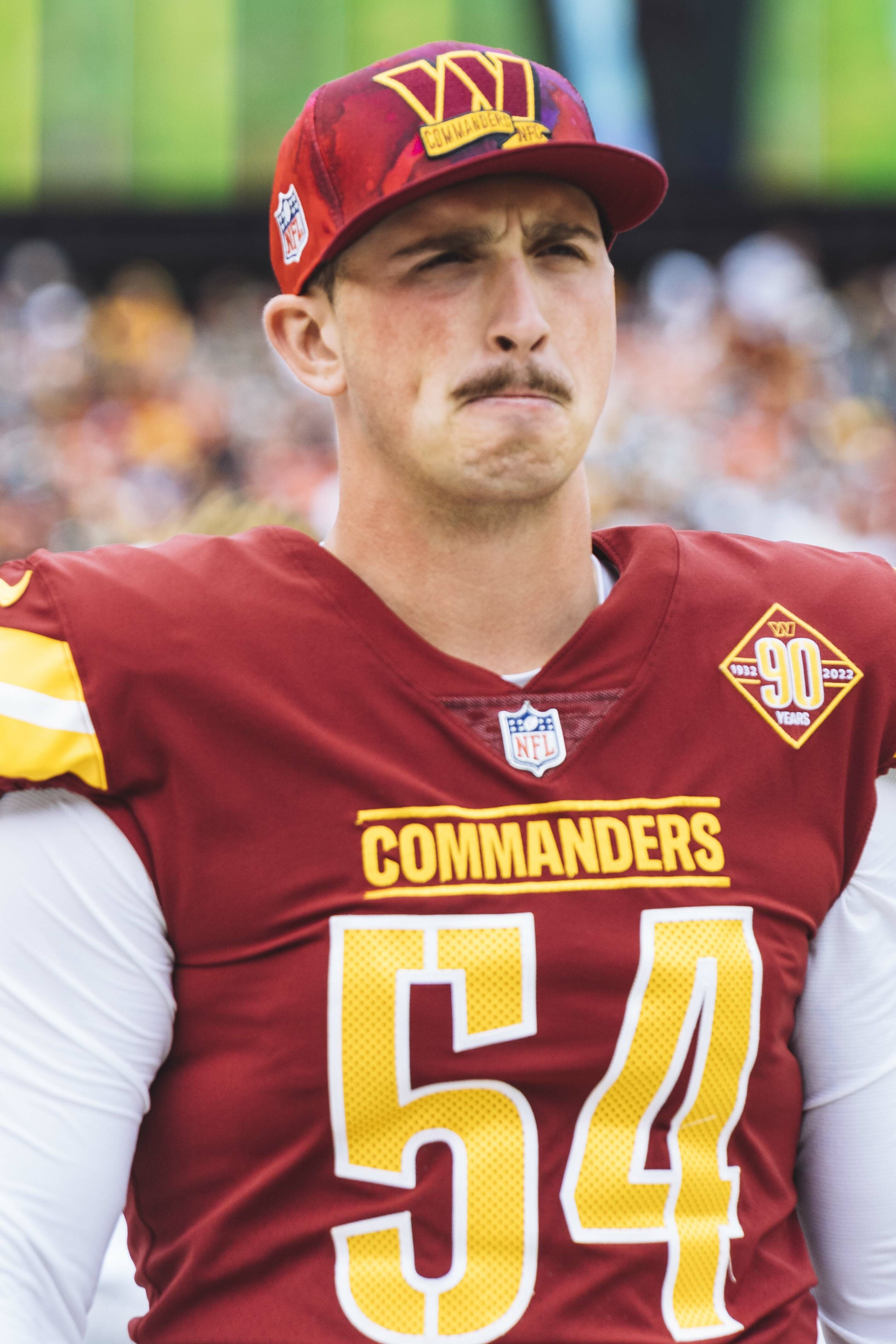
- Cheeseman with Washington Commanders in 2022

No. 54
- Position: Long snapper

Personal information
- Born: April 26, 1998 (age 28); New Albany, Ohio, U.S.
- Listed height: 6 ft 4 in (1.93 m)
- Listed weight: 237 lb (108 kg)

Career information
- High school: Lincoln (Gahanna, Ohio)
- College: Michigan (2016–2020)
- NFL draft: 2021: 6th round, 225th overall pick

Career history
- Washington Football Team / Commanders (2021–2023)

Career NFL statistics
- Games played: 48
- Stats at Pro Football Reference

Camaron Cheeseman (born April 26, 1998) is an American former professional football player who was a long snapper in the National Football League (NFL). He played college football for the Michigan Wolverines and was selected by the Washington Football Team in the sixth round of the 2021 NFL draft.

== Career ==
Pre-draft measurables
| Height | Weight | Arm length | Hand span | 40-yard dash | 10-yard split | 20-yard split | 20-yard shuttle | Three-cone drill | Vertical jump | Broad jump | Bench press |
|---|---|---|---|---|---|---|---|---|---|---|---|
| 6 ft 4 1/4 in (1.94 m) | 239 lb (108 kg) | 32 in (0.81 m) | 9 3/8 in (0.24 m) | 5.09 s | 1.75 s | 2.89 s | 4.58 s | 7.57 s | 33.0 in (0.84 m) | 9 ft 2 in (2.79 m) | 17 reps |
All values from Pro Day

Cheeseman was unranked by 247Sports.com coming out of Lincoln High School in Gahanna, Ohio. He committed to Michigan on December 17, 2015. Cheeseman was selected by the Washington Football Team in the sixth round (225th overall) of the 2021 NFL draft. He signed his four-year rookie contract on May 13, 2021.

Following multiple bad snaps by Cheeseman in the 2023 Week 2 win over the Denver Broncos, head coach Ron Rivera announced that the team would be bringing in free agent long snappers for work outs. Despite working out five different long snappers, the Commanders chose to stick with Cheeseman. On December 18, 2023, he was released by the Commanders. The release followed the team's Week 15 game against the Los Angeles Rams, in which Cheesman botched two snaps, one on a punt and the other on an extra point.

== Personal life ==
Cheeseman plans to study dentistry at Ohio State University once his NFL career is over. He took the Dental Admission Test at Columbus State Community College and scored in the 92nd percentile. Cheeseman was previously a research assistant in the field while at Michigan, where he co-authored a research paper on an orthodontic appliance for fixing underbites.
