= Gahanna-Jefferson Public Schools =

School district in Ohio

Gahanna-Jefferson Public Schools is a school district headquartered in Gahanna, Ohio, in the Columbus, Ohio metropolitan area.

In addition to almost all of Gahanna, the district serves a portion of Columbus. Its territory is in Jefferson and Mifflin townships.

== History ==
Circa 2007 the district began holding Chinese classes, with 40 students enrolled in them altogether. By 2011 this number was up to 350, and the district was attempting to secure grants from the U.S. federal government and the central government of China, with each being $1,000,000 and $30,000, respectively. By January 2011 the Hanban agreed to give a $30,000 grant. The U.S. Department of Education had granted $762,000, to be used in a five-year period, as part of the Foreign Language Assistance Program (FLAP). By November 2012 it had ended all FLAP funding, and hence the district lost what remained of its grant.

On August 1, 2016, Steve Barrett became the superintendent of the district.

=== Politics ===
The Gahanna-Jefferson Public School District is run by the Gahanna-Jefferson Public School board, headed by President Beryl Piccolantonio as of September 8, 2021.

In October 2020, Gahanna-Jefferson Education Association, the teachers' union in the school district, voted to go on strike in wake of a contract dispute with the school board. The strike, which gained support of teachers, students, and community members, lasted from 13 October 2020 through 16 October 2020.

== Schools ==
High school

- Lincoln High School

Middle schools

- Middle School East
- Middle School South
- Middle School West

Elementary schools

- Blacklick Elementary School
- Chapelfield Elementary School
- Goshen Lane Elementary School
- High Point Elementary School
- Jefferson Elementary School
- Lincoln Elementary School
- Royal Manor Elementary School

Pre-Kindergarten

- Preschool Program

== Eastland-Fairfield Career & Technical School ==
School	Location	Satellite Locations	School Districts	Grades
Eastland-Fairfield Career & Technical School	Eastland: Groveport, Ohio Fairfield: Carrol, Ohio	Lincoln High School; Groveport Madison High School; New Albany High School; Pickerington High School North; Reynoldsburg High School; Canal Winchester High School	16 School Districts	11–12
