= Reynoldsburg City Schools =

School district in Ohio, United States

Address
- 7244 East Main Street Reynoldsburg, Ohio, 43068; United States

District information
- Type: Public
- Grades: PK–12
- Schools: 10
- NCES District ID: 3904700

Students and staff
- Students: 7,130 (2024–2025)
- Teachers: 423.68 (on an FTE basis) (2024–2025)
- Staff: 680.11 (on an FTE basis) (2024–2025)
- Student–teacher ratio: 16.83 (2024–2025)
- Colors: Purple and gold

Other information
- Website: www.reyn.org

Reynoldsburg City School District, or Reynoldsburg City Schools, is a school district headquartered in Reynoldsburg, Ohio.

In Franklin County, it includes the majority of the portions of Reynoldsburg in that county and small portions of Columbus.

A portion is in Licking County, where it includes most of the Licking County portion of Reynoldsburg.

A portion is in Fairfield County, where it includes a portion of the Fairfield County portion of Reynoldsburg.

== History ==
In 1968, Reynoldsburg City Schools became one of the 5 districts to join the Joint Vocational School District of Eastland Vocational School (now Eastland-Fairfield Career & Technical Schools).

In 2021 the district proposed a bond, worth $85 million, which would have established a preschool, additional kindergarten programs which would have taken the whole instructional day, and replacements of sections of Hannah Ashton Middle School. The bond vote failed, with a 207-vote difference between fail and pass. Cyn Rosi and Karina Cheung of NBC 4i described the bond election as "extremely tight".

Tracy Reed became the superintendent in 2022.

== Schools ==
=== High schools ===
Name	Grades	CEEB code
Reynoldsburg High School - Livingston Campus	9-12 (Note: Preschool is held at Livingston Campus.)	364380
Reynoldsburg High School - Summit Campus	9-12	365841

=== Middle/Junior high schools ===
Name	Grades
STEM Middle @ Baldwin Road Junior High School	6-8
Waggoner Road Junior High School	6-8

=== Elementary schools ===
Name	Grades
French Run Elementary School	K-5
Herbert Mills STEAM Elementary School	K-5
Rosehill Elementary School	K-5
Slate Ridge Elementary School	K-5
Summit Road STEM Elementary School	K-5
Taylor Road Elementary School	K-5
Waggoner Road Elementary School	K-5

== Eastland-Fairfield Career & Technical School ==
School	Location	Satellite Locations	School Districts	Grades
Eastland-Fairfield Career & Technical School	Eastland: Groveport, Ohio Fairfield: Carrol, Ohio	Lincoln High School; Groveport Madison High School; New Albany High School; Pickerington High School North; Reynoldsburg High School; Canal Winchester High School	16 School Districts	11–12
