= Creekside Gahanna =

Coordinates: 40°01′14″N 82°52′48″W

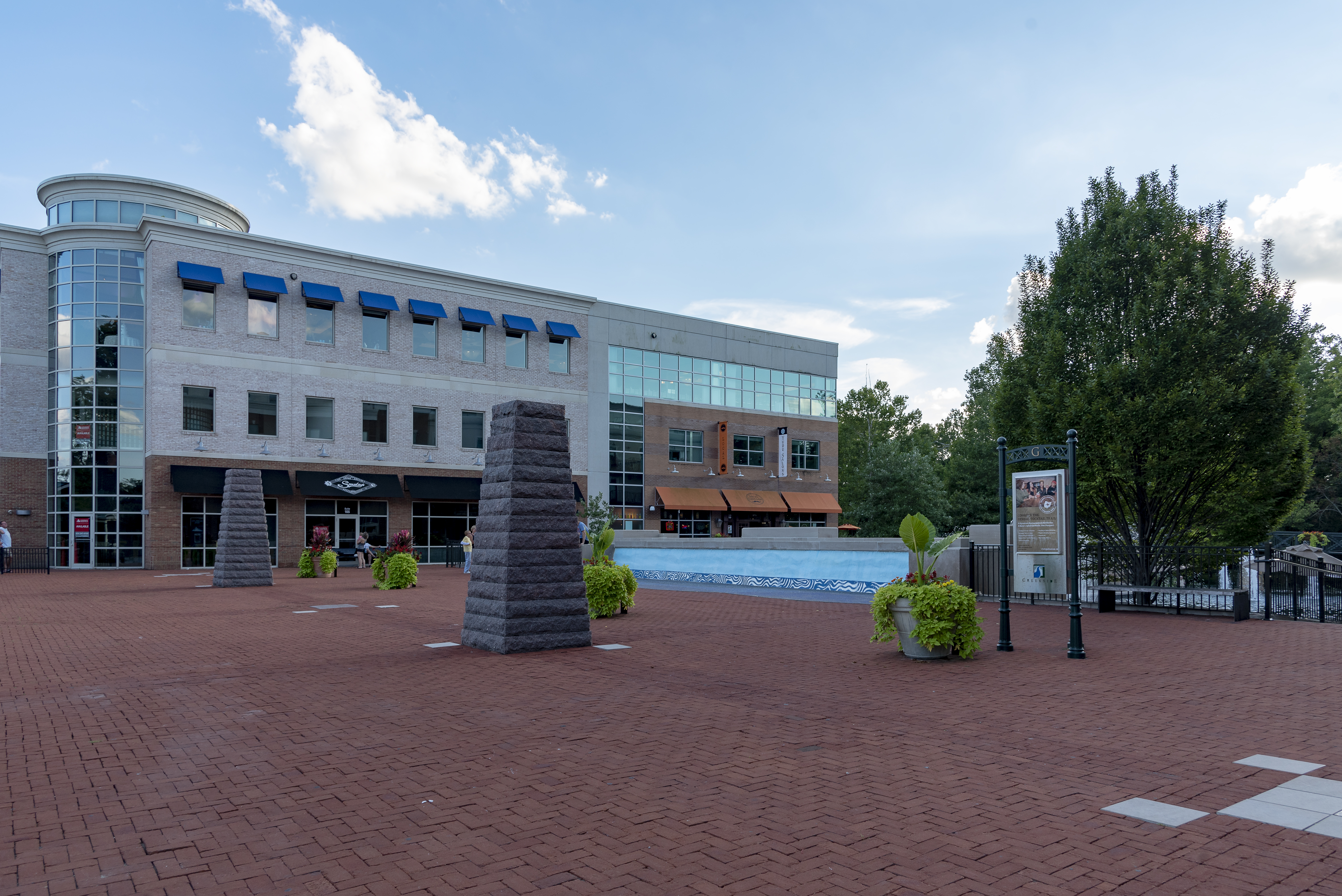
Creekside Gahanna

Creekside Gahanna, more formally called Gahanna-Creekside, is a mixed-use development located in downtown Gahanna, Ohio (also known as Olde Gahanna).

== About ==
Creekside Gahanna encompasses 240,000 square feet (22,000 m^{2}) of property along Gahanna's Big Walnut Creek. The development features 71 luxury condominiums, 100,000 square feet (9,300 m^{2}) of commercial space in three separate buildings, and amenities designed to incorporate the area's natural landscape. Current retail businesses include Nostalgia Brewing Company, Cold Stone Creamery, and Local Cantina, Barrel and Boar, Creekside Conference and Event Center, Golden Nail and Salon, and others. Other significant business tenants include, Bird-Houk Collaborative, C-Suites Executive Offices, Fourth Floor Interactive, Gahanna Area Chamber of Commerce, and the Metropolitan Emergency Communications Center, a 911 dispatch center which handles fire and EMS requests for Gahanna and other portions of eastern Franklin County as well as part of Fairfield County.

== History ==
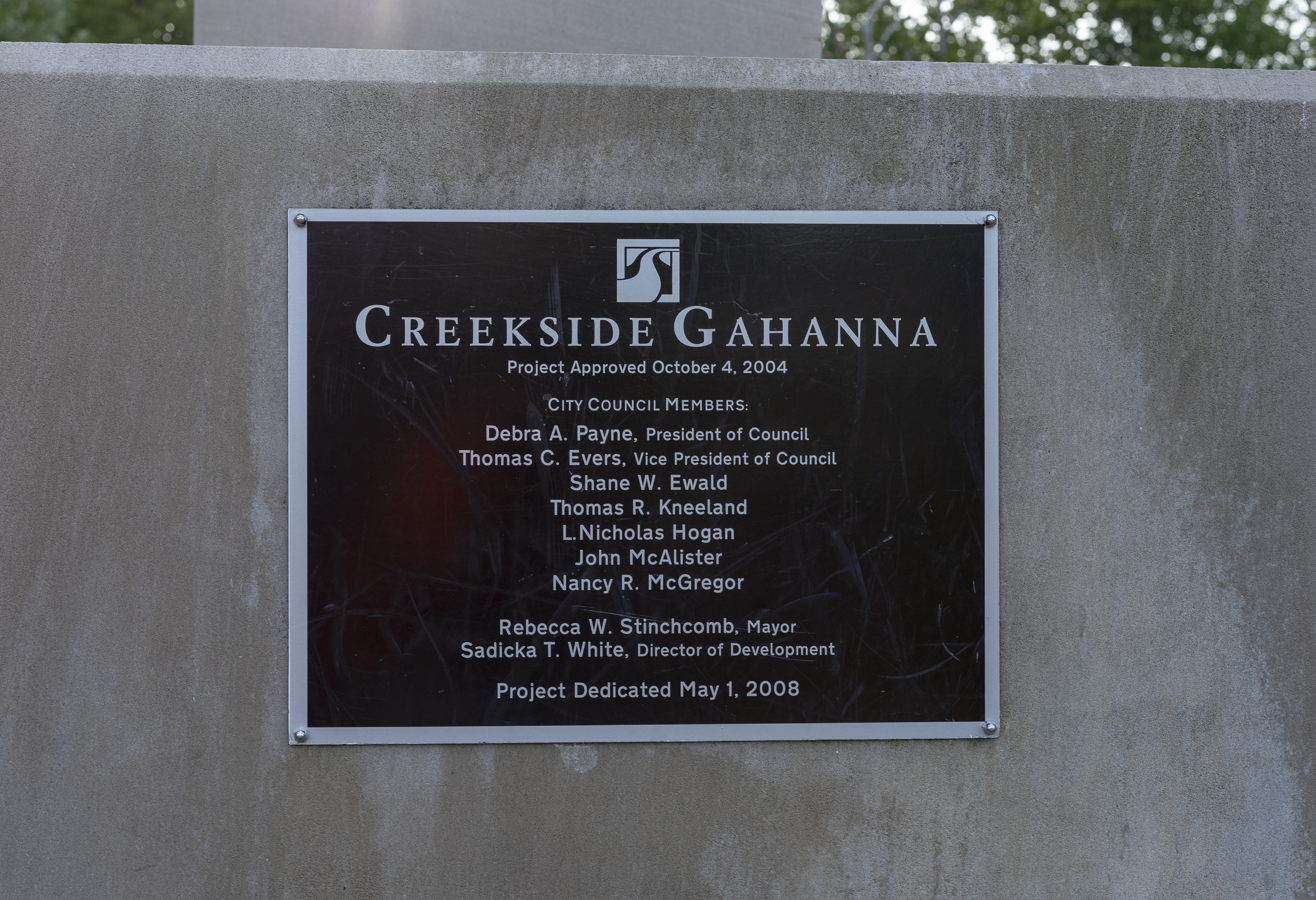
Creekside Gahanna dedication Plaque

In 2003, the city of Gahanna issued a request for proposals (RFP) for the redevelopment of a large tract of city-owned land in the center of Mill Street's north–south span. The RFP required the developer was to accommodate vehicles with ample parking without detracting from the evolving urban and pedestrian atmosphere in the area. The city's request also emphasized its desire for a true mixed-use development, with all uses taking advantage of views of the adjacent Big Walnut Creek.

The Stonehenge Company, then of New Albany, Ohio and later of Gahanna, partnered with the professional architecture and planning firm Bird-Houk Collaborative to propose a multi-story development with first-floor retail facing Mill Street and what would become Creekside Park. Upper levels would contain office space and residential condominium units. Public parking would be hidden in an underground garage with parking for the condominium residents provided inside the “wraparound” residential building. Approximately 389 new public parking spaces would be created.

The city expressed its initial commitment to the broad concept, selected Stonehenge as the developer, and then entered more than 18 months of discussions with Stonehenge and the Community Improvement Corporation. The process involved the public in a series of public forums for the project and passed through several city boards and commissions.

Groundbreaking occurred began in May 2005 and the development celebrated its official grand opening on May 1, 2008.

The Creekside development project was forced into foreclosure in early 2011 when Huntington Bank filed a suit against Stonehenge and its project owner affiliate, claiming that they defaulted on over $30 million in loans. Approximately one year later, the Creekside development was purchased by Michigan-based Strathmore Development Company for $10.5 million.

== Construction timeline ==
Spring 2005

- Demolition of existing structures

Summer 2005

- Site Excavation (Completed October 2005)
- Construction of underground garage

Fall 2005

- Construction of garage cap

Winter 2005

- Completion of architectural & engineering plans
- Construction of buildings shells

Spring 2006

- Construction of above ground garage

Winter 2006

- Construction of Creekside Park
- Construction of public plazas

Winter 2007

- Project completion

Spring 2008

- Grand opening

Spring 2011

- Property into receivership

Summer 2012

- Project out of receivership and sold

== Creekside facts ==
- According to city officials, the Creekside revitalization project was inspired by the San Antonio River Walk project.
- The development features an elaborate water wall, a lagoon supported by imported natural limestone, two waterfalls, a performance stage, and public plazas and parks.

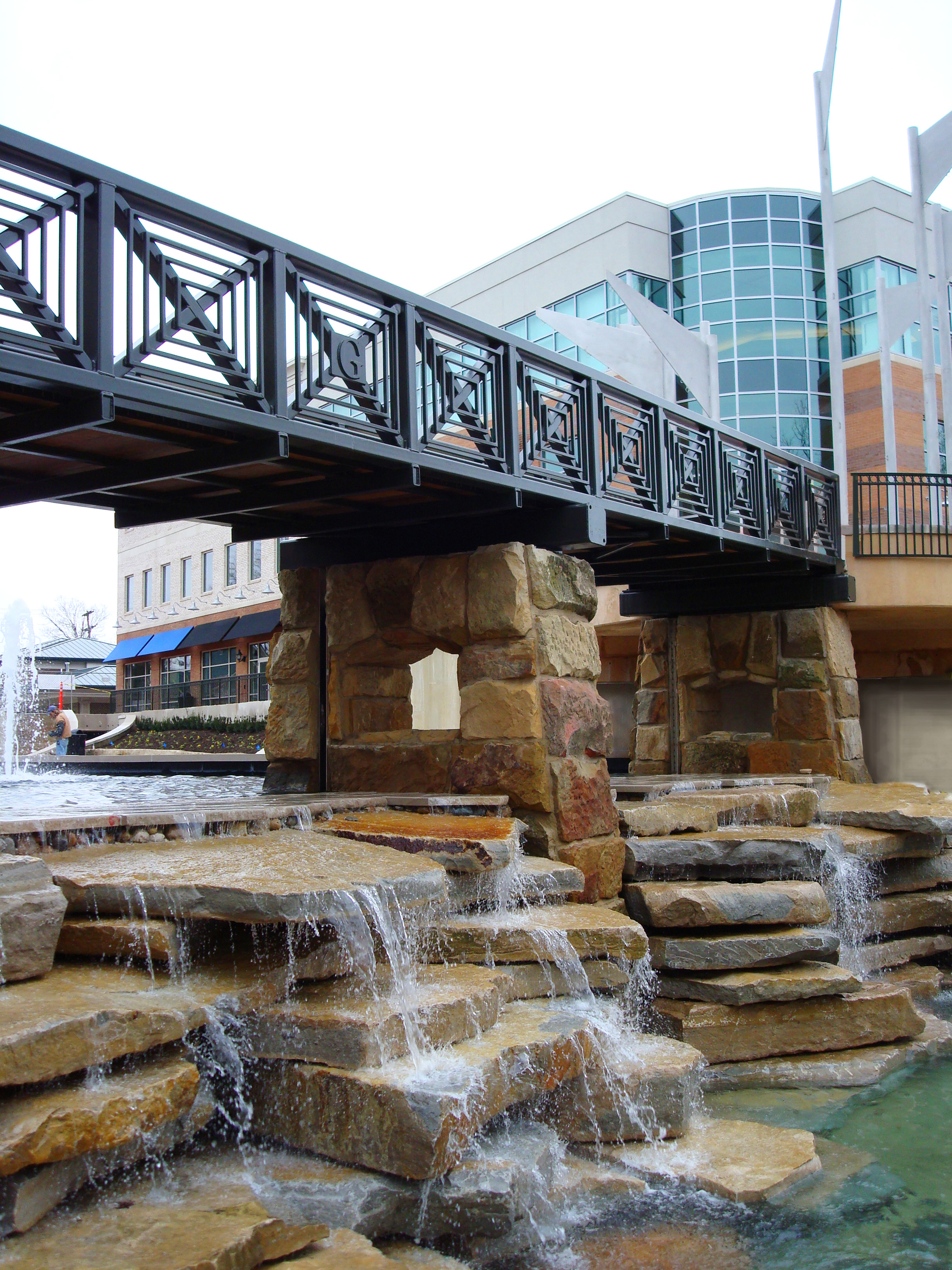
Waterfalls at Creekside Gahanna

- The natural stone wall in the center of the development uses large pieces of natural limestone to create walls defining the public plazas of the project. Each stone—weighing between 15,000 and 32,000 pounds—was shaped by hand on-site in order to create an interlocking wall system holding the natural earth below the upper plazas and accentuating the elevation variations of the project site. The walls use more than one million pounds of limestone from throughout Ohio, Indiana, and Kansas.
- Creekside won the 2007 National Showcase Award from the Council of Development Finance Agencies recognizing the national best Tax increment financing program. Finalists included the City of Gahanna, City of Kansas City, City of San Antonio and Washington, D.C.
- Creekside is currently host to the Glenna Goodacre sculpture “Basket Dance.”

== See also ==
- New urbanism
- Mixed-use development
- Tax increment financing
