= Gahanna Christian Academy =

Gahanna Christian Academy (GCA)

Location
- 817 North Hamilton Road; Gahanna, (Franklin County), Ohio 43230; United States; 40°2′22″N 82°52′1″W

Information
- Type: Private, Coeducational high school
- Religious affiliations: Christian, Non-Denominational
- Opened: 1980 (Preschool-6th Grade); 1987 (Middle School); 1996 (High School); 2006 (International School)
- Founder: Rev. Gene Speich
- Closed: May 24, 2024
- Superintendent: April Domine
- Grades: Preschool, Kindergarten-8th Grade
- Colors: Royal Blue and White
- Slogan: The Power Of One
- Sports: Soccer, Volleyball, Basketball, Baseball, Softball, Track & Field
- Team name: Eagles
- Affiliation: Assemblies of God
- Website: gahannachristianacademy.com

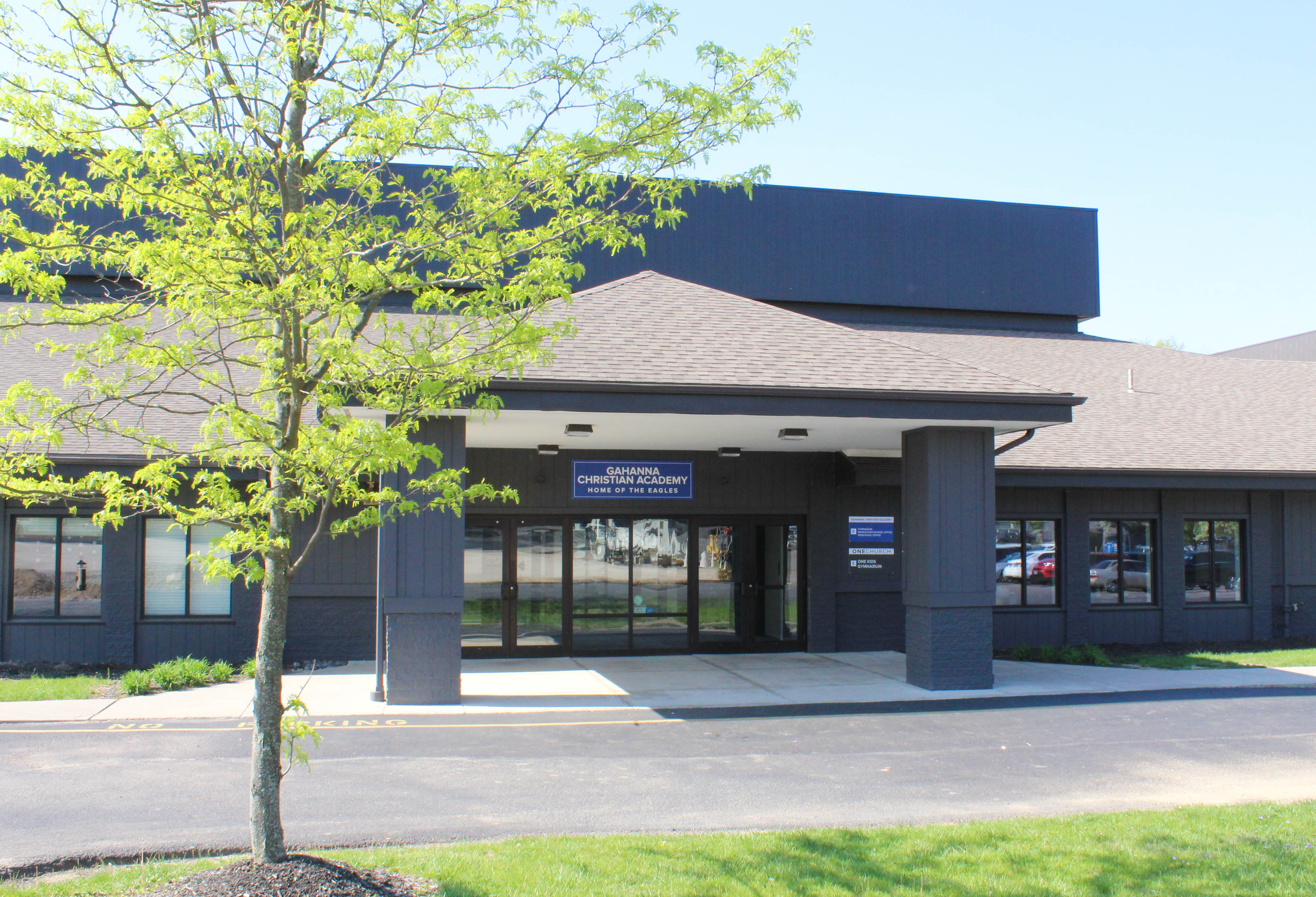
Gahanna Christian Academy

Gahanna Christian Academy (GCA) was a private school (preschool and k-8) situated in the northeast area of Columbus, Ohio in the suburb of Gahanna, Ohio. Gahanna Christian Academy is chartered by the Ohio Department of Education and is a member of the Association of Christian Schools International.

== History ==
Gahanna Christian Academy began as Evangel Christian Academy in 1980 as an outreach of Evangel Temple Assembly of God Church, now is overseen by One Church. Envisioned by Pastor Gene Speich, a "family life center" that included classrooms was built, initially housing preschool through sixth grade. 7th and 8th grades were added in 1987, and a full high school for grades 9-12 was opened in 1996.

April Domine, Ed.D, became the Superintendent of Gahanna Christian Academy in 2016. During the 2017-2018 school year, GCA became an innovative project-based school that is using research-based methods of small group teaching to provide individualized support to students.

Starting in the 2018-2019 school year, Gahanna Christian Academy will focus its efforts on providing the best quality early childhood center and Kindergarten through 8th grade program.

== Athletics ==
Gahanna Christian Academy offers middle school boys and girls basketball.
