= Reynoldsburg High School =

Location
- 6699 East Livingston Avenue; 8579 Summit Road; Reynoldsburg, Ohio 43068; United States; 39°56′35″N 82°48′58″W (Livingston Campus); 39°58′11″N 82°45′00″W (Summit Campus)

Information
- Type: Public high school
- Established: 1870
- School district: Reynoldsburg City School District
- Principals: Jennifer Harris; Kyle Gibson (Livingston Campus); Veronica Brownlee (Summit Campus)
- Grades: 9–12
- Enrollment: 2,115 (2026–2027)
- Campus: Suburban
- Colors: Purple and gold
- Slogan: We Are... Raiders!
- Fight song: Pep-Fight
- Athletics conference: Ohio Capital Conference
- Mascot: Rocky Raider
- Team name: Raiders
- Rival: Pickerington High School Central
- Accreditation: Ohio Department of Education
- Newspaper: The Compass
- Yearbook: Reynolian
- NCES School ID HSHS: 390470005655
- NCES school id 9X Impact: 390470006014
- NCES school id eSTEM: 390470005566
- NCES school id Encore: 390470005656
- NCES school id BELL: 390470005653
- Website: rhs.reyn.org

Reynoldsburg High School (RHS) is a public high school located in Reynoldsburg, Ohio, United States, and the only high school in the Reynoldsburg City School District. The school is divided into five academies housed at two separate campuses, each of which has its own academy leaders and administrative team. The athletic teams are known as the Reynoldsburg Raiders, and the school colors are purple and gold. Reynoldsburg High School was established in 1870. The Livingston Campus opened in 1961, followed by the Summit Campus in 2011.

The district, and therefore the high school, serve most of Reynoldsburg and portions of Columbus.

== History ==
The earliest known about RHS is a log cabin that served as the first school in Truro Township around 1819. By 1858, a two-story building was completed on the intersection of Jackson Street and Broadway Drive which housed The Reynoldsburg Union Academy. Organized in 1868 under superintendent Dr. Darlington J. Snyder, the school had 12 grades and graduated its first class of six students in 1871. The two-story brick building was eventually remodeled in 1925 and a third floor was added. The building is now currently Hannah J. Ashton Middle School, a school which has now become defunct. Now, RHS has two campuses of high schools, one on Livingston Avenue, which was opened in 1961, the other on Summit Road opened in 2011 when Reynoldsburg redesigned the high school system, using interest-based "academies" for students to get a better learning experience.

== State championships ==
- Girls volleyball - 1989
- Girls track and field - 2009, 2010, 2011, 2012
- Girls basketball- 2022

== Notable alumni ==
- Ashton Dulin, NFL player
- Eric Fryer, professional baseball player in Major League Baseball (MLB)
- Mike Matheny, professional baseball player and manager in MLB
- Roosevelt Nix, professional football player in the National Football League (NFL)
