= Gahanna-Lincoln High School =

Public high school in Columbus, Ohio, US

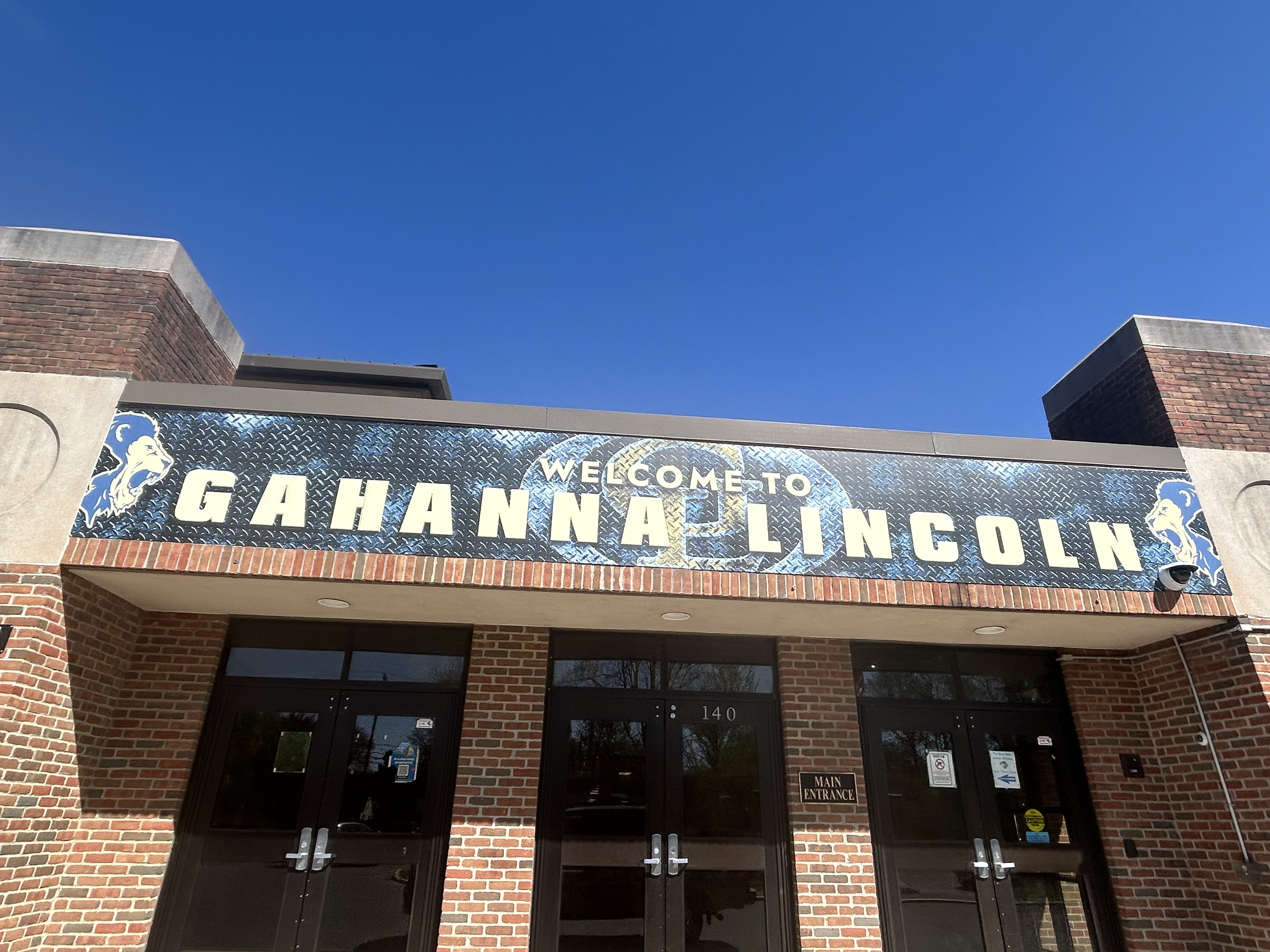
- The sign at the entrance

Location
- 140 South Hamilton Road; Gahanna, Ohio 43230; United States; 40°00′59″N 82°51′55″W

Information
- Type: Public, Coeducational high school
- Established: 1928
- Status: Open, to be demolished
- School district: Gahanna-Jefferson Public Schools
- Superintendent: Steve Barrett
- Principal: Jessica Williams
- Staff: 220
- Teaching staff: 116.74 (FTE)
- Grades: 9–12
- Enrollment: 2,443 (2023-2024)
- Student to teacher ratio: 20.93
- Campus size: 38 acres (150,000 m^{2})
- Colors: Blue and gold
- Slogan: "Personal Responsibility in Developing Excellence (PRIDE)"
- Athletics conference: Ohio Capital Conference
- Mascot: Lion
- Nickname: "The Lions"
- Team name: Golden Lions
- Accreditation: North Central Association of Colleges and Schools
- Publication: Lincoln Live, The ROAR Podcast, Lincoln Sports Zone
- Website: glhs.gahannaschools.org

Gahanna-Lincoln High School is a public high school in Gahanna, Ohio, United States. It is in the Gahanna-Jefferson Public Schools district. It is one of the largest high schools in Greater Columbus, and was established in 1928.

== History ==
The original building was a one-room schoolhouse, which was established in 1928 in the area of what is now the Lincoln Hall. Multiple changes, tweaks, and additions have been made to the structure of the school, notably the construction of Hamilton (1963) and Clark (2011) halls.

The name "Gahanna-Lincoln" is a result of an early struggle between the city of Gahanna and Jefferson Township. Despite being considered as an option, Jefferson High School was not chosen, and the City and Township compromised, naming the school Lincoln High School.

Lincoln High School's mascot is the Lion, giving rise to the nickname the "Home of the Lions." The school colors are Royal Blue and Athletic Gold. The 38-acre (150,000 m^{2}) campus is made up of three buildings, named "Lincoln", "Jefferson", and "Hamilton". This compound, along with athletic facilities and the district administration building, take up nearly an entire block, bounded on the north by Havens Corners Road, and on the west by South Hamilton Road. The original 1928 building, renovated in 1987, is known today as Lincoln Hall. The 2000 addition is known as Jefferson Hall and was built to replace the previous C Building which stood where the entrance to the stadium is today. Hamilton Hall was originally constructed in 1963 and had additions in 1982 (an auditorium, a library, a band room, and an auxiliary gym) and 1995 (science classrooms, theater and TV classrooms, a choir room, a new main office complex and a second cafeteria). The three buildings are all connected by inner hallways, however they can also all be accessed by outside doors. Starting in the 2011–2012 school year the names Hamilton, Lincoln, and Jefferson Hall replaced the names A, B, and C Building, respectively.

The construction of a new high school was begun in August 2023, and one of the main reasons was the population growth of Columbus, an issue that can be seen throughout many areas of the city, including Gahanna.

The new high school will have a larger student capacity, more open learning space, and multiple "prides", which will be used for all core classes (Sciences, Mathematics, English, etcetera) as well as a media center and an underwater robotics pool. It has been constructed directly opposite of the current building, in the place of the Lincoln Stadium. The new high school will also be 3 floors for a majority of the building, contrary to only two portions of the old high school being multiple floors.

As of November 2025, the structure of the new building has been entirely completed and the third floor has been fully furnished. The second floor is close to completion. The first has finished flooring and walls. A vast majority of the Jim Singer Auditorium and main entrance is completed. Work on the building is scheduled to finish by January 2026 and a ribbon cutting is scheduled for January 10th, 2026.

Photos, videos, and announcements regarding the new campus can be found on any Gahanna-Jefferson Public Schools social media.

== Athletics ==
Gahanna's athletic teams compete in the Ohio Division of the Ohio Capital Conference (OCC).

The high school offers the following sports: Boys: Cross Country, Golf, Football & Soccer in the Fall; Basketball, Wrestling, Swimming, Bowling, & Ice Hockey in the Winter; Baseball, Track & Field, Tennis, Volleyball and Lacrosse in the Spring. Girls: Cheerleading, Cross Country, Golf, Soccer, Volleyball & Tennis in the Fall; Basketball, Bowling, Swimming, Cheerleading in the Winter; and Softball, Track & Field and Lacrosse in the Spring.

The school claims six team state titles: two in boys track and field (1979 and 2009), one in boys soccer (2009), one in girls bowling (2017–18), and two titles in girls track (2015, 2018) The school has been State Runner-up in: Football (1976), Boys Volleyball (1991); Softball (2003 & 2011) and has played in the State Final Four in Boys Basketball (2010), Softball (1980, 1982, 2016), Baseball (2013, 2014), and Football (2022).

A new synthetic turf athletic field was installed in 2008 and replaced in 2018 to allow many sports to be played in the main stadium, including football, soccer and lacrosse as well as uses by Physical Education Classes, marching band and other teams for conditioning.

A new athletic complex was also recently added to Gahanna sports. Blacklick athletic complex features 2 new dirt softball fields, and a synthetic turf field that is used by soccer and lacrosse. The athletic complex resides at Blacklick Elementary school and provides an enhanced experience for the Gahanna community and Gahanna athletics.

=== Ohio High School Athletic Association state championships ===
- Boys Track and Field – 1979, 2009.
- Boys Soccer – 2009
- Girls Cross Country - 2025
- Girls Track and Field – 2015 (shared with Cincinnati Withrow), 2018, 2022, 2023
- Girls Bowling - 2018, 2020, 2021

== Notable alumni ==
- Amanda Adkins, swimmer
- Camaron Cheeseman, American football player
- Jonathon Cooper, American football player
- Mike Faist, award-winning actor and singer
- John Hughes, American football player
- Phil Klein, baseball player
- Wil Trapp, soccer player
- Evan White, baseball player
