= Gahanna, Ohio =

City in Ohio, United States

- City
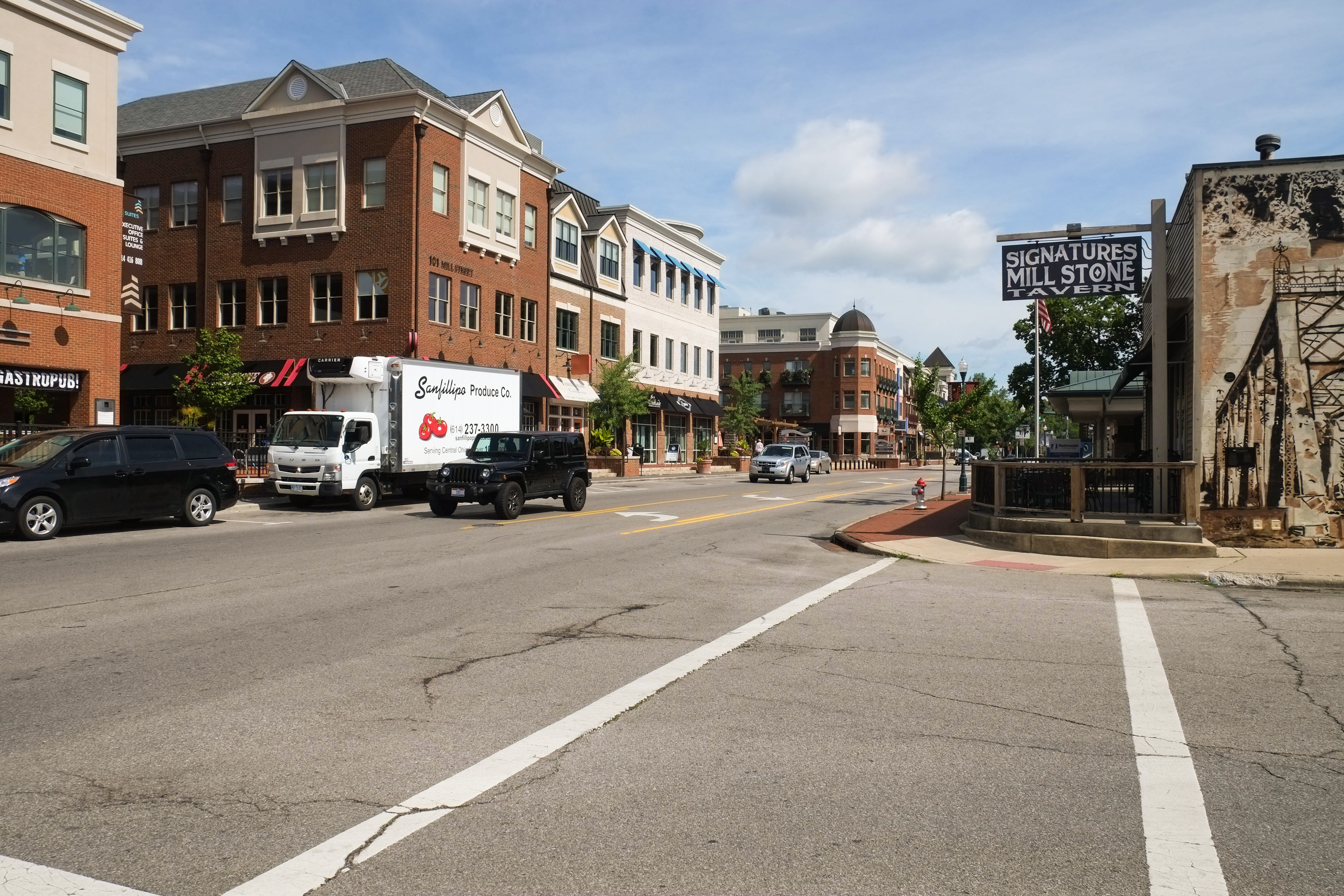
- Creekside Gahanna

- Logo
- Motto(s): Live, Work, Play
- Interactive map of Gahanna, Ohio
- Location within Ohio Location within the United States
- Coordinates: 40°00′38″N 82°51′32″W
- Country: United States
- State: Ohio
- County: Franklin

Area
  - Total: 12.61 sq mi (32.65 km^{2})
  - Land: 12.43 sq mi (32.20 km^{2})
  - Water: 0.17 sq mi (0.45 km^{2})
- Elevation: 794 ft (242 m)

Population (2020)
  - Total: 35,726
  - Estimate (2023): 35,159
  - Density: 2,874/sq mi (1,109.5/km^{2})
- Time zone: UTC−5 (Eastern (EST))
  - Summer (DST): UTC−4 (EDT)
- ZIP Code: 43230
- Area codes: 614 and 380
- FIPS code: 39-29106
- GNIS feature ID: 2394837
- Website: www.gahanna.gov

Gahanna is a city in northeastern Franklin County, Ohio, United States. It is a suburb of Columbus. The population was 35,726 at the 2020 census. It was founded in 1849.

== History ==
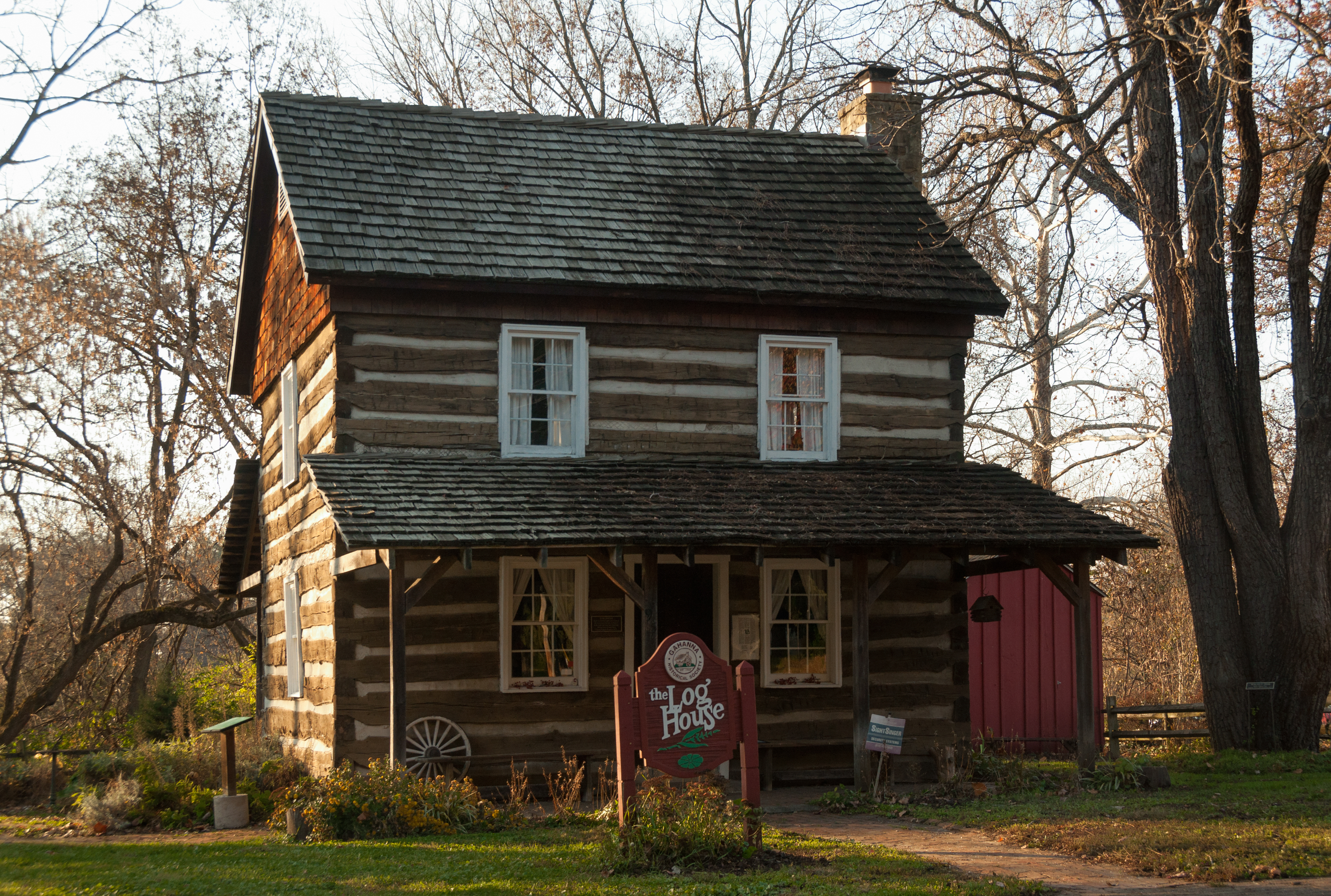
The Log House run by the Gahanna Historical Society

Gahanna was founded along the Big Walnut Creek in 1849 by John Clark of Ross County from 800 acres (320 ha) of land that his father, Joseph Clark, had purchased from Governor Worthington in 1814. Clark named his property the Gahanna Plantation, from which the City of Gahanna derives its name. The name Gahanna is derived from a Native American word for three creeks joining into one and is the former name of the Big Walnut Creek. The City of Gahanna's Official Seal refers to this confluence of three creeks with the inscription "Three In One".

Gahanna maintained a considerable rivalry with the adjacent village of Bridgeport. Located directly across Granville Street from Gahanna and also along the banks of the Big Walnut Creek, Bridgeport was founded in 1853 by Jesse Baughman, a former Franklin County Commissioner. The two villages eventually put aside their differences and merged into one. They adopted the name Gahanna as there was already another village in Ohio called Bridgeport. In March 1881, 55 citizens of Gahanna petitioned Franklin County to incorporate the village. The incorporation was granted in June and was recorded on August 8, 1881. The now-incorporated village then held its first mayoral election and on October 6, 1881, swore in its first mayor, L. John Neiswander.

On January 7, 1994, United Express Flight 6291 crashed in Gahanna, killing five of the eight people on board.

On February 11, 2016, a mass stabbing took place at the Nazareth restaurant, located just outside Gahanna in neighboring Columbus. One person was killed, and four others were injured. The attack was investigated by the FBI.

== Geography ==
Cities and Townships that border Gahanna:

- Mifflin Township: west
- Columbus, Ohio: north, west, and south
- New Albany, Ohio: north
- Jefferson Township: east

In addition, several small "islands" of Jefferson Township are located entirely within the boundaries of the city.

According to the United States Census Bureau, the city has a total area of 12.60 square miles (32.63 km^{2}), of which 12.43 square miles (32.19 km^{2}) is land and 0.17 square miles (0.44 km^{2}) is water.

Big Walnut Creek has a significant impact on the geography of Gahanna associated with its tributaries Rocky Fork Creek and Sycamore Run.

== Demographics ==
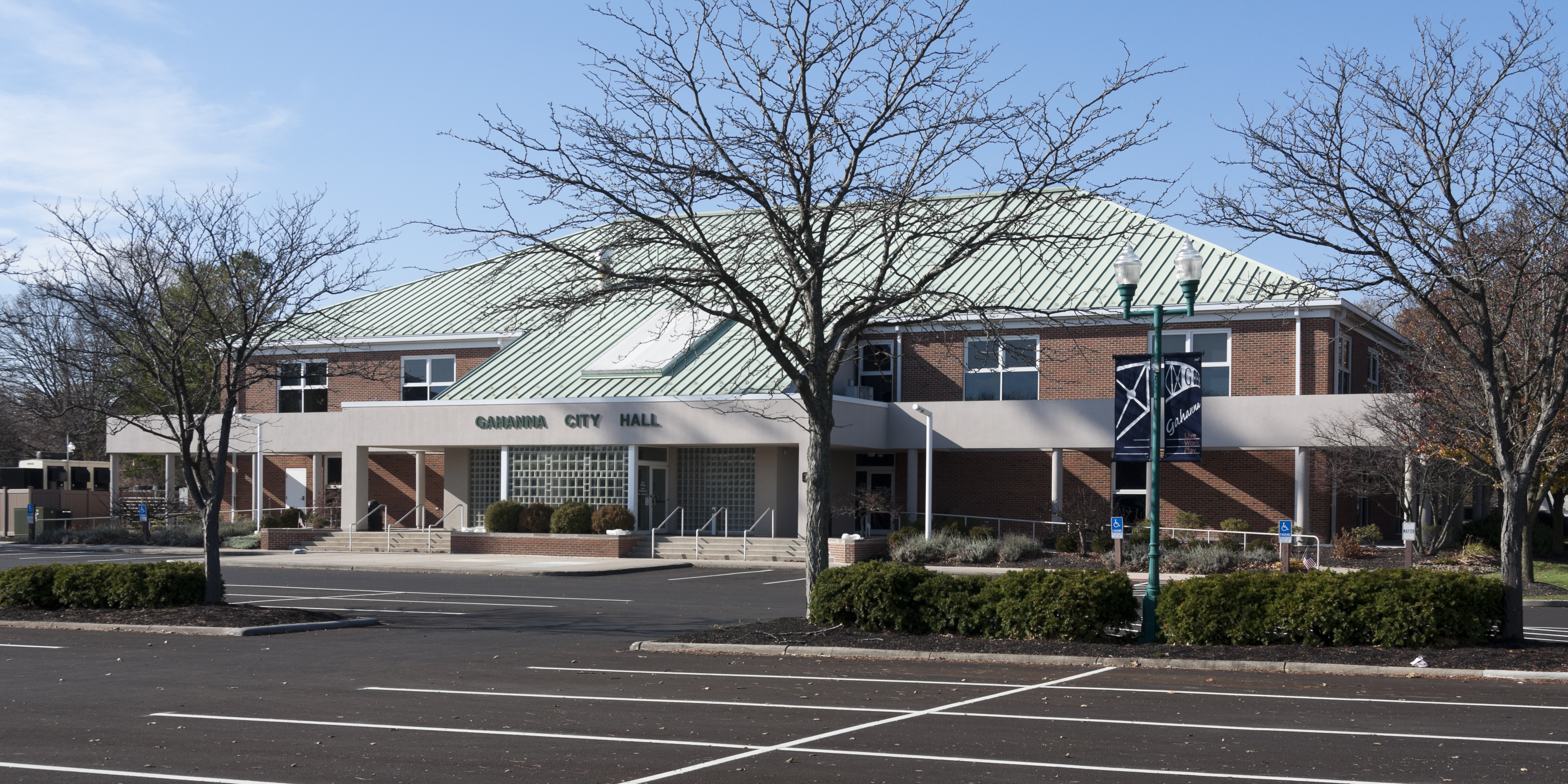
Gahanna City Hall

Historical population
Census	Pop.	Note	%±
1880	235		—
1890	207		−11.9%
1900	276		33.3%
1910	294		6.5%
1920	347		18.0%
1930	417		20.2%
1940	425		1.9%
1950	596		40.2%
1960	2,717		355.9%
1970	12,400		356.4%
1980	16,398		32.2%
1990	27,791		69.5%
2000	32,636		17.4%
2010	33,248		1.9%
2020	35,726		7.5%
2025 (est.)	35,986		0.7%
US Census

=== Income and poverty ===
The median income for a household in the city was $72,813, and the median income for a family was $85,348. Males had a median income of $51,391 versus $35,922 for females. The per capita income for the city was $29,040. About 2.2% of families and 3.7% of the population were below the poverty line, including 4.1% of those under age 18 and 4.4% of those age 65 or over.

=== 2020 census ===
As of the 2020 census, Gahanna had a population of 35,726. The median age was 39.7 years. 23.3% of residents were under the age of 18 and 17.3% of residents were 65 years of age or older. For every 100 females there were 91.9 males, and for every 100 females age 18 and over there were 87.9 males age 18 and over.

100.0% of residents lived in urban areas, while 0.0% lived in rural areas.

There were 14,165 households in Gahanna, of which 32.9% had children under the age of 18 living in them. Of all households, 52.9% were married-couple households, 14.3% were households with a male householder and no spouse or partner present, and 26.8% were households with a female householder and no spouse or partner present. About 25.5% of all households were made up of individuals and 11.6% had someone living alone who was 65 years of age or older.

There were 14,734 housing units, of which 3.9% were vacant. The homeowner vacancy rate was 0.8% and the rental vacancy rate was 6.6%.

Racial composition as of the 2020 census
Race	Number	Percent
White	26,446	74.0%
Black or African American	5,174	14.5%
American Indian and Alaska Native	93	0.3%
Asian	1,123	3.1%
Native Hawaiian and Other Pacific Islander	19	0.1%
Some other race	532	1.5%
Two or more races	2,339	6.5%
Hispanic or Latino (of any race)	1,311	3.7%

=== 2010 census ===
As of the census of 2010, there were 33,248 people, 13,037 households, and 9,151 families residing in the city. The population density was 2,674.8 inhabitants per square mile (1,032.7/km^{2}). There were 13,577 housing units at an average density of 1,092.3 per square mile (421.7/km^{2}). The racial makeup of the city was 82.1% White, 11.2% African American, 0.2% Native American, 3.1% Asian, 0.9% from other races, and 2.4% from two or more races. Hispanic or Latino of any race were 2.6% of the population.

There were 13,037 households, of which 35.6% had children under the age of 18 living with them, 55.1% were married couples living together, 11.5% had a female householder with no husband present, 3.6% had a male householder with no wife present, and 29.8% were non-families. Of all households, 24.4% were made up of individuals, and 8.7% had someone living alone who was 65 years of age or older. The average household size was 2.54 and the average family size was 3.04.

The median age in the city was 39.4 years. 25.3% of residents were under the age of 18; 7.2% were between the ages of 18 and 24; 25.4% were from 25 to 44; 30.3% were from 45 to 64, and 11.7% were 65 years of age or older. The gender makeup of the city was 47.9% male and 52.1% female.

=== 2000 census ===
As of the census of 2000, there were 32,636 people, 11,990 households, and 8,932 families residing in the city. The population density was 2,632.8 people per square mile (1,016.2/km^{2}). There were 12,390 housing units at an average density of 999.5 per square mile (385.8/km^{2}). The racial makeup of the city was 86.46% White, 8.14% African American, 0.20% Native American, 3.25% Asian, 0.03% Pacific Islander, 0.48% from other races, and 1.44% from two or more races. Hispanic or Latino of any race were 1.32% of the population.

There were 11,990 households, out of which 40.4% had children under the age of 18 living with them, 62.4% were married couples living together, 9.2% had a female householder with no husband present, and 25.5% were non-families. Of all households, 20.9% were made up of individuals, and 6.6% had someone living alone who was 65 years of age or older. The average household size was 2.70 and the average family size was 3.17.

In the city, the population was spread out, with 28.9% under the age of 18, 6.5% from 18 to 24, 31.7% from 25 to 44, 24.3% from 45 to 64, and 8.7% who were 65 years of age or older. The median age was 36 years. For every 100 females, there were 94.2 males. For every 100 females age 18 and over, there were 90.4 males.

== Economy ==
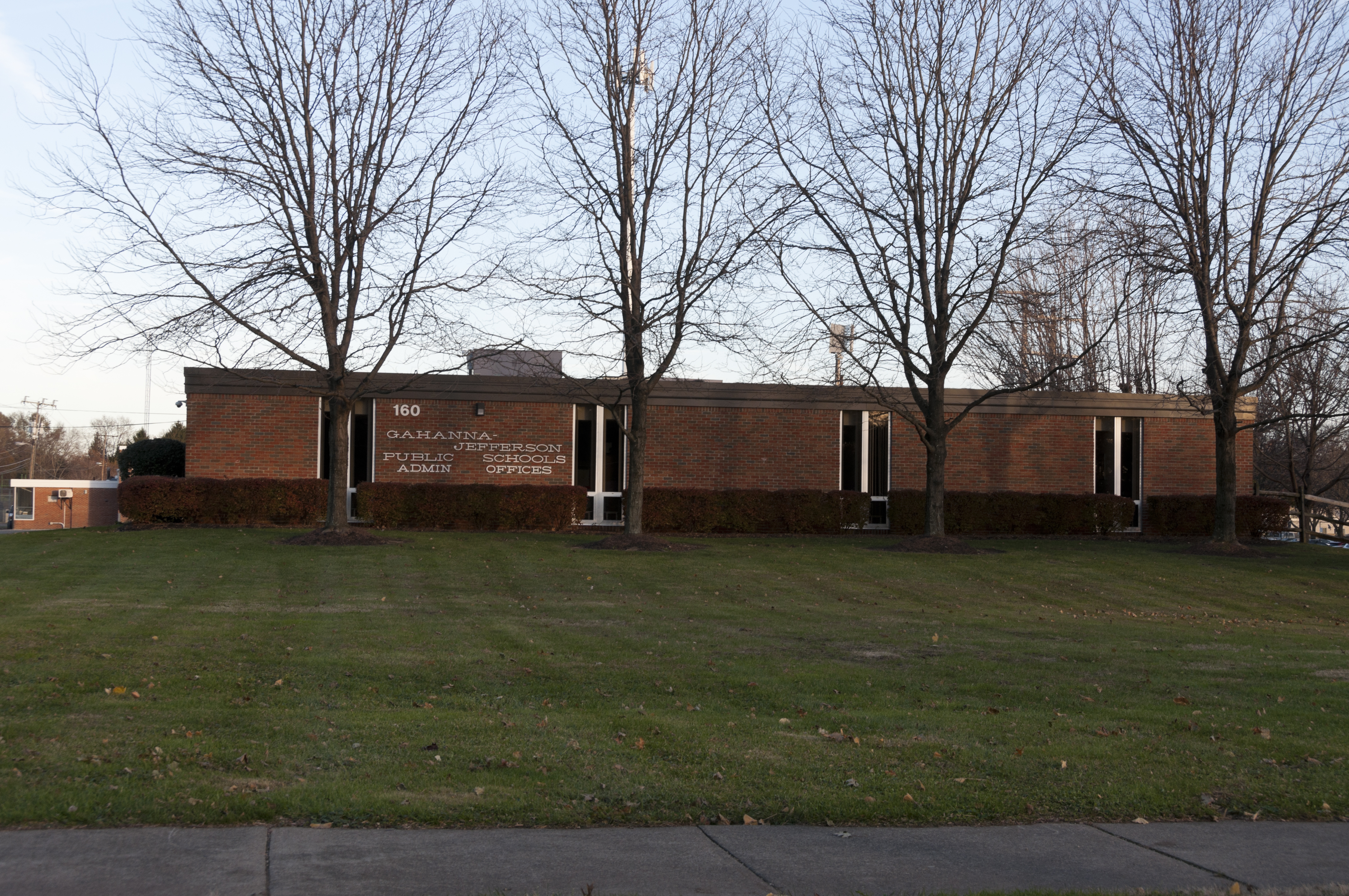
Gahanna-Jefferson School Administration

In recent years, Gahanna has worked hard at revitalizing the downtown "Olde Gahanna" section of the city. In October 2004, Gahanna's new Creekside Gahanna redevelopment and park extension project began, making way for everything from public spaces and restaurants to residences and office space. As of late 2007, the project businesses began to open. The area includes a 389-space public parking garage. The multimillion-dollar project is expected to bring in up to 150 new residents as well as bolster tourism to the area.

Gahanna also has an aggressive brownfields assessment and redevelopment program that includes the development of a community-wide brownfields inventory, the cleanup of a major abandoned landfill, and city-initiated assessments and demolition of abandoned or environmentally suspect properties.

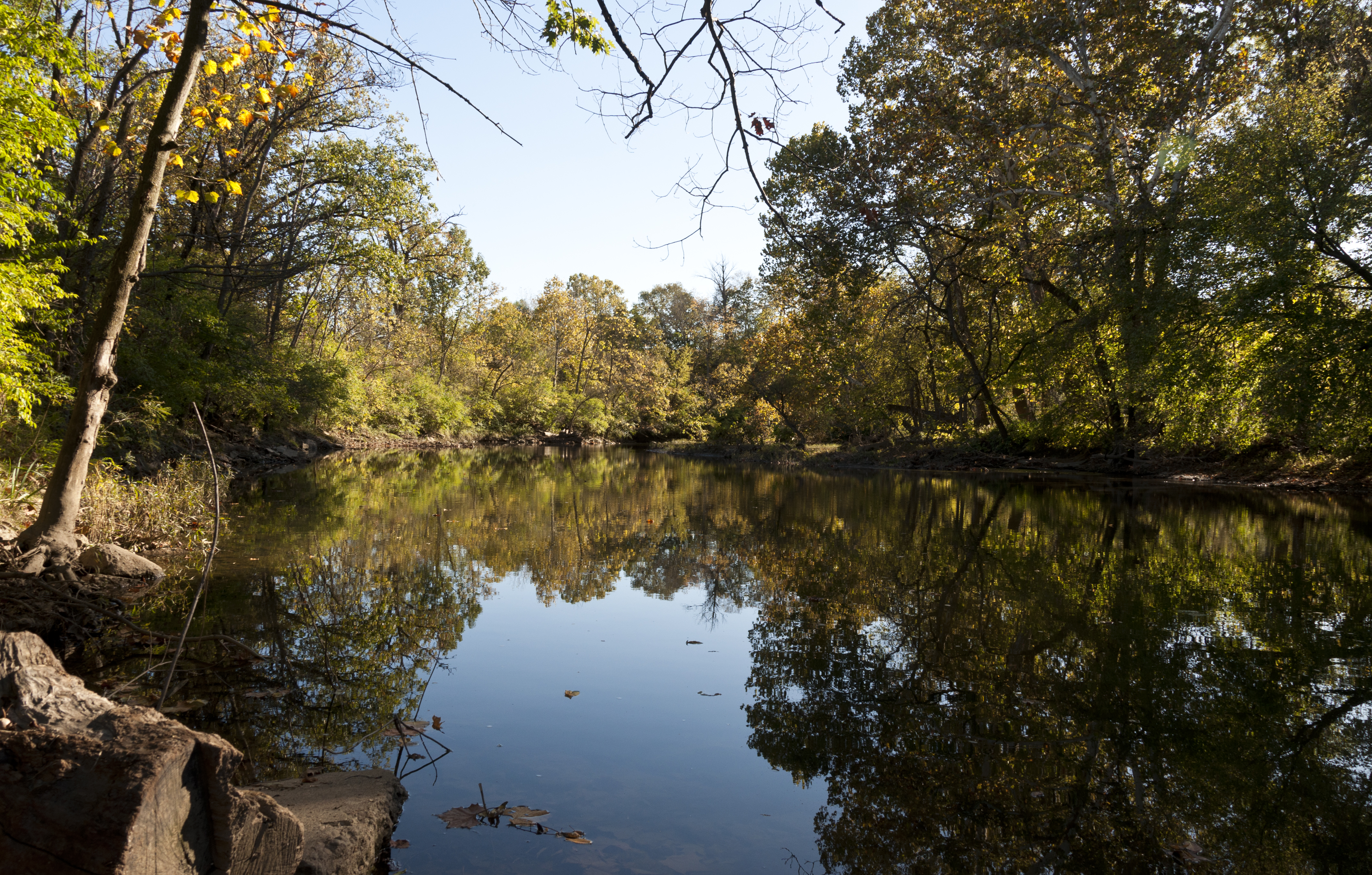
The Big Walnut Creek, as it flows through the Gahanna portion

The largest brownfields redevelopment project to date is the closure of the Bedford I Landfill, completed in late 2007. The closure was a result of a 2005 public-private development partnership with private firm Value Recovery Group, of Columbus, Ohio, and non-profit Central Ohio Community Improvement Corporation to remediate and redevelop the abandoned Bedford I Landfill. The 200-acre (0.81 km^{2}) site was transformed into Central Park of Gahanna, a major greenfield development campus that features a golf academy known as The Golf Depot. The City of Gahanna and Value Recovery Group, which owns nearly 60 acres of the developable land, have been working to attract recreational, brewing industry, and office development and continue to solicit development opportunities. Funding for this major project included $3,000,000 from the Clean Ohio Redevelopment Fund, $200,000 from the US EPA, $150,000 from the Community Development Block Grant program, significant assistance with assessment, stormwater remediation, and staff time from Gahanna, and other investments by the Central Ohio CIC. Gahanna was listed as #96 of the Top 100 Best Places to Live in 2007 by Money magazine.

== Transportation ==
Gahanna is one of the closest cities to John Glenn Columbus International Airport and has direct road access to the airport through U.S. Route 62, which eventually runs concurrently with Interstate 670 to provide access to the airport.

Road access to Gahanna is provided by US 62 and Interstate 670. In addition, both roads are accessible through the Columbus Outerbelt (Interstate 270), which runs between the city and John Glenn Airport. Ohio State Route 317 also runs through downtown Gahanna as the main north-south road. Public transport to and from Gahanna is accessed through COTA, which runs bus lines 24 and 25 through downtown.

== Education ==
The City of Gahanna is in the Gahanna-Jefferson Public School District. The school colors are blue and gold. Gahanna has seven elementary schools, three middle schools, and one high school: Gahanna-Lincoln High School. However, there are also several private education options, including the Columbus Academy, located on Cherry Bottom Road, and Gahanna Christian Academy, on N.Hamilton Road, as well as various parochial schools.

== Notable people ==
- Saad Abdul-Salaam, MLS defender for Columbus Crew SC
- Amanda Adkins, swimmer
- Braden Eves, racing driver
- Mike Faist, actor
- John Hughes, NFL defensive lineman
- Todd Douglas Miller, filmmaker
- Georgia Schweitzer, WNBA player and NCAA All-American at Duke University
- Seth Stammler, defenseman/midfielder for MLS side New York Red Bulls
- Wil Trapp, MLS midfielder for Minnesota United FC
- Nick Ward, Michigan State Spartans men's basketball (2016-2019)
- Evan White, first-round draft pick for the Seattle Mariners in 2017
