= Reynoldsburg, Ohio =

- City
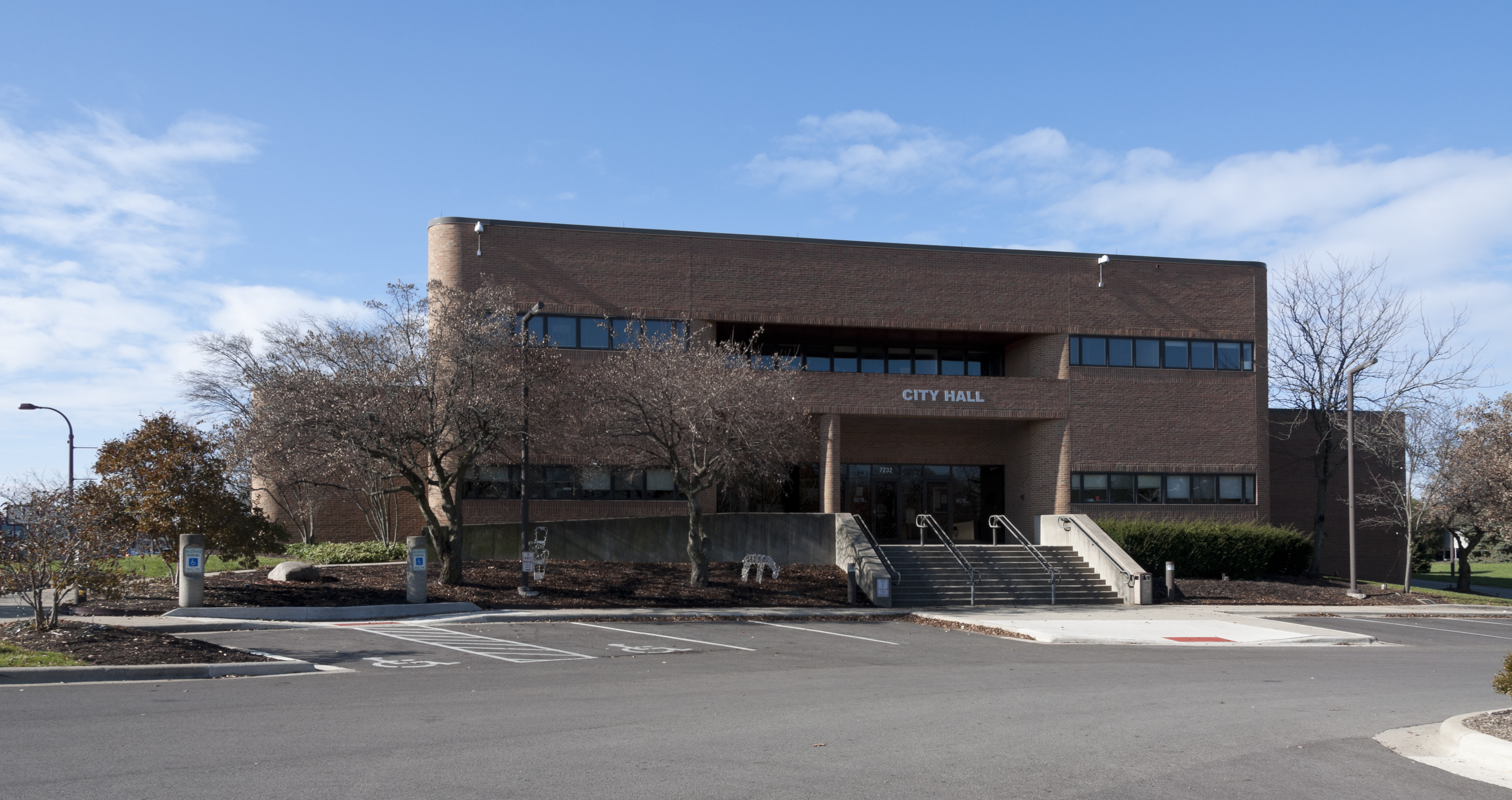
- Reynoldsburg City Hall

- Flag Seal Logo
- Nickname: The Birthplace of the Tomato
- Motto: "The City of Respect"
- Interactive map of Reynoldsburg, Ohio
- Location within Ohio Location within the United States
- Coordinates: 39°57′36″N 82°47′05″W
- Country: United States
- State: Ohio
- Counties: Franklin, Licking, Fairfield
- Settled: 1802
- Incorporated: March 16, 1839
- Granted city status: 1960
- Named after: James C. Reynolds

Government
  - Type: Mayor–council government
  - Body: Reynoldsburg City Council
  - Mayor: Joe Begeny (D)
  - Council members: List: Bhuwan Pyakurel (D); Julie Towns (D); Louis Salvati (D); Teneah Chambers (D); Erin Hill (D); Stacie Baker (D); Mildred Johnson (D); Angela Abram (D)

Area
  - Total: 11.41 sq mi (29.55 km^{2})
  - Land: 11.33 sq mi (29.34 km^{2})
  - Water: 0.081 sq mi (0.21 km^{2})
- Elevation: 896 ft (273 m)

Population (2020)
  - Total: 41,076
  - Estimate (2025): ▲43,350
  - Density: 3,625.9/sq mi (1,399.98/km^{2})
- Time zone: UTC-5 (Eastern (EST))
  - Summer (DST): UTC-4 (EDT)
- ZIP code: 43068, 43069
- Area codes: 614 and 380
- FIPS code: 39-66390
- GNIS feature ID: 2396357
- Website: https://reynoldsburg.gov/

Reynoldsburg (/ˈrɛnˌəldzbɜːrɡ/ REN-uhldz-burg) is a city in Fairfield, Franklin, and Licking counties in the U.S. state of Ohio. It is a suburban community in the Columbus, Ohio metropolitan area. The population was 41,076 at the 2020 census, making it the 30th-most populous city in Ohio.

== History ==
Reynoldsburg was first settled in 1802 by James and Margaret Crawford. It was originally called Frenchtown when it was platted in 1831, named after its surveyor, John French. The present name is for James C. Reynolds, a local merchant who was instrumental to the village's founding. A post office called Reynoldsburgh was established in 1833, and the name was changed to Reynoldsburg in 1893.

Reynoldsburg is known as "The Birthplace of the Tomato," claiming the first commercial variety of tomato was bred there in the 19th century, and the Tomato Festival has been held every year since 1965. Every year there is a Tomato Festival Queen. The Tomato Festival takes place in August.

== Geography ==
According to the United States Census Bureau, the city has a total area of 11.24 square miles (29.11 km^{2}), of which 11.16 square miles (28.90 km^{2}) is land and 0.08 square miles (0.21 km^{2}) is water. Blacklick Creek flows through Reynoldsburg.

== Demographics ==
Historical population
Census	Pop.	Note	%±
1850	309		—
1870	457		—
1880	375		−17.9%
1890	393		4.8%
1900	339		−13.7%
1910	431		27.1%
1920	491		13.9%
1930	532		8.4%
1940	652		22.6%
1950	724		11.0%
1960	7,793		976.4%
1970	13,921		78.6%
1980	19,519		40.2%
1990	25,748		31.9%
2000	32,069		24.5%
2010	35,893		11.9%
2020	41,076		14.4%
2025 (est.)	43,350		5.5%
Sources: 2020

=== 2020 census ===
As of the 2020 census, Reynoldsburg had a population of 41,076. The median age was 36.7 years. 25.4% of residents were under the age of 18 and 14.7% of residents were 65 years of age or older. For every 100 females there were 91.8 males, and for every 100 females age 18 and over there were 86.4 males age 18 and over.

99.9% of residents lived in urban areas, while 0.1% lived in rural areas.

There were 15,439 households in Reynoldsburg, of which 35.1% had children under the age of 18 living in them. Of all households, 44.8% were married-couple households, 16.9% were households with a male householder and no spouse or partner present, and 31.0% were households with a female householder and no spouse or partner present. About 26.7% of all households were made up of individuals and 10.6% had someone living alone who was 65 years of age or older.

There were 16,014 housing units, of which 3.6% were vacant. The homeowner vacancy rate was 0.8% and the rental vacancy rate was 4.7%.

Racial composition as of the 2020 census
Race	Number	Percent
White	20,803	50.6%
Black or African American	11,952	29.1%
American Indian and Alaska Native	133	0.3%
Asian	4,036	9.8%
Native Hawaiian and Other Pacific Islander	6	0.0%
Some other race	1,272	3.1%
Two or more races	2,874	7.0%
Hispanic or Latino (of any race)	2,293	5.6%

=== 2010 census ===
As of the census of 2010, there were 35,893 people, 14,387 households, and 9,551 families living in the city. The population density was 3,216.2 inhabitants per square mile (1,241.8/km^{2}). There were 15,611 housing units at an average density of 1,398.8 per square mile (540.1/km^{2}). The racial makeup of the city was 69.7% White or European American, 23.3% African American, 0.2% Native American, 1.8% Asian, 0.1% Pacific Islander, 1.3% from other races, and 3.5% from two or more races. Hispanic or Latino of any race were 3.4% of the population.

There were 14,387 households, of which 35.3% had children under the age of 18 living with them, 45.8% were married couples living together, 15.9% had a female householder with no husband present, 4.7% had a male householder with no wife present, and 33.6% were non-families. 28.0% of all households were made up of individuals, and 9.3% had someone living alone who was 65 years of age or older. The average household size was 2.49 and the average family size was 3.06.

The median age in the city was 37.3 years. 26.3% of residents were under the age of 18; 8.1% were between the ages of 18 and 24; 26.8% were from 25 to 44; 27.3% were from 45 to 64; and 11.6% were 65 years of age or older. The gender makeup of the city was 47.4% male and 52.6% female.

=== 2000 census ===
As of the census of 2000, there were 32,069 people, 12,849 households, and 8,801 families living in the city. The population density was 3,030.0 inhabitants per square mile (1,169.9/km^{2}). There were 13,434 housing units at an average density of 1,269.3 per square mile (490.1/km^{2}). The racial makeup of the city was 85.01% White, 10.44% African American, 1.07% Native American, 1.69% Asian, 0.05% Pacific Islander, 0.74% from other races, and 1.81% from two or more races. Hispanic or Latino of any race were 1.80% of the population.

There were 11,109 households, out of which 34.8% had children under the age of 18 living with them, 52.8% were married couples living together, 12.3% had a female householder with no husband present, and 31.5% were non-families. 25.8% of all households were made up of individuals, and 7.2% had someone living alone who was 65 years of age or older. The average household size was 2.49 and the average family size was 3.01.

In the city, the population was spread out, with 26.6% under the age of 18, 8.0% from 18 to 24, 31.9% from 25 to 44, 23.4% from 45 to 64, and 10.1% who were 65 years of age or older. The median age was 35 years. For every 100 females, there were 91.0 males. For every 100 females age 18 and over, there were 87.0 males.

The median income for a household in the city was $51,108, and the median income for a family was $60,183. Males had a median income of $40,608 versus $30,448 for females. The per capita income for the city was $23,388. About 4.4% of families and 5.5% of the population were below the poverty line, including 7.9% of those under age 18 and 4.4% of those age 65 or over.

== Economy ==
The Ohio Department of Agriculture, the Ohio Fire Academy, and the Office of the Ohio State Fire Marshal are located in Reynoldsburg.

According to the city's 2021 Independent Audit Report, the largest employers in the city are:

Employer	# of Employees
Victoria Secret Service Company LLC	3,024
Reynoldsburg City Schools	1,111
Kroger	1,110
Walmart	998
State of Ohio	964
Mast Logistics Services Inc.	823
Target Corporation	637
Bath & Body Works Brand Mgmt	391
Victoria's Secret Stores Brand Management	291
Bath & Body Works LLC	272

== Parks and recreation ==
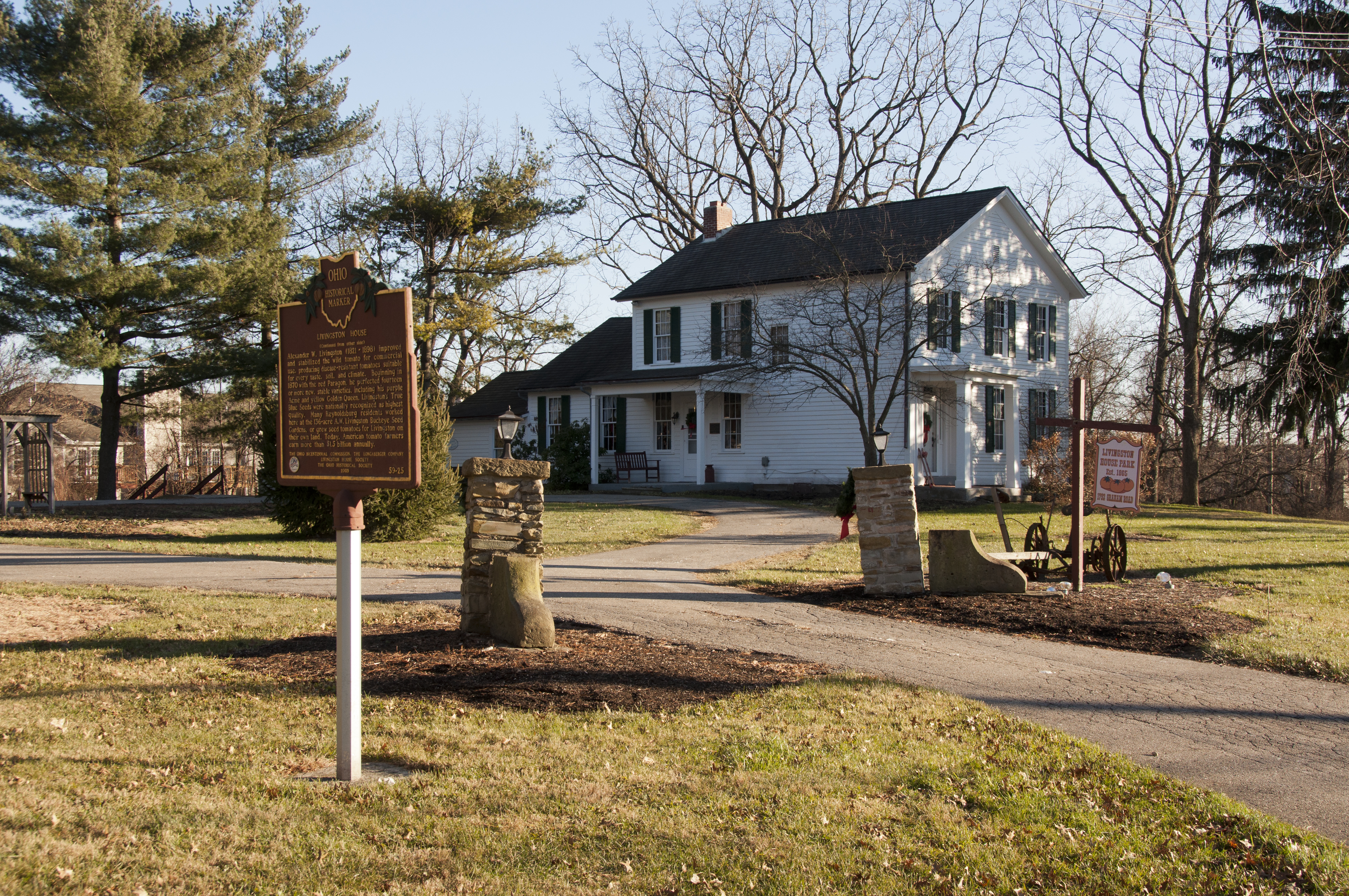
Alexander W. Livingston House, now a museum

The City Parks and Recreation Department is responsible for 275 acres of parkland including nine major parks. Established in 1948 the first Franklin County Metro Park opened in Reynoldsburg, Blacklick Woods and Blacklick Woods Golf Course; a 643-acre park with a golf course, several multi purpose trails, one of the oldest Beech-maple forest in central Ohio, a winter sledding hill, a Nature Center and the Walter A. Tucker State Nature Preserve located inside Blacklick Woods.

== Education ==
The majority of Reynoldsburg is in the Reynoldsburg City Schools, which currently operates seven elementary schools, two junior high schools, and one high school with two campuses. The high school and junior high schools' mascot is Rocky Raider (a pirate), and its colors are purple and gold. The school district is also one of the 16 Eastland-Fairfield Career & Technical Schools affiliate schools.

=== Schools ===
High School (9–12)

- Reynoldsburg High School
  - Livingston Campus
  - Summit Campus

Junior High Schools (6–8)

- Baldwin Road Junior High
- Waggoner Road Junior High

Elementary Schools (K–5)

- Herbert Mills Elementary
- Rosehill Elementary
- Slate Ridge Elementary
- Taylor Road Elementary
- Summit Road Elementary
- French Run Elementary
- Waggoner Road Elementary

== Infrastructure ==
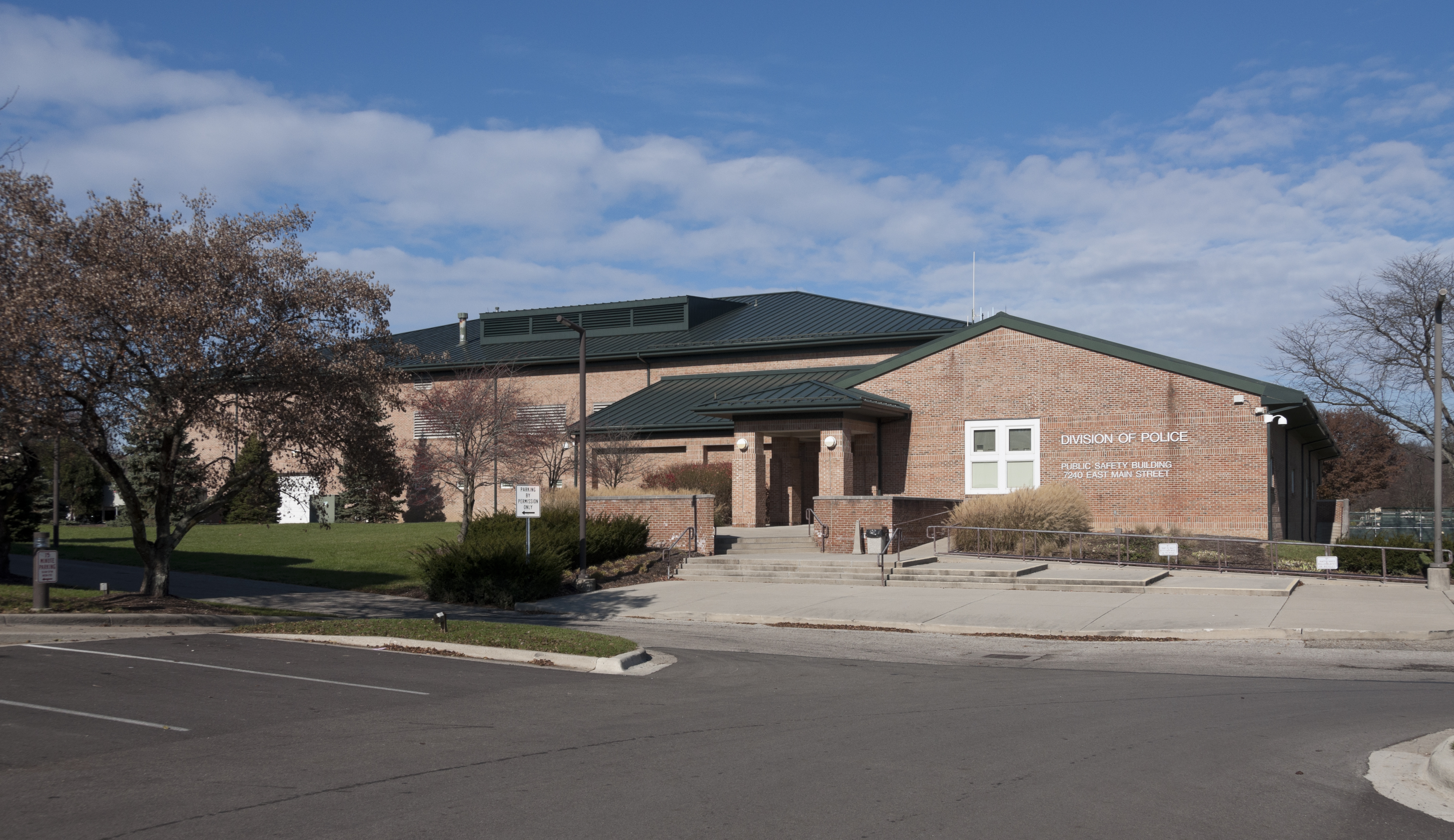
Reynoldsburg Police Headquarters

The Reynoldsburg Division of Police, with a total of 70 sworn officers, 21 civilians, and 12 reserve police officers, is located next to City Hall. The agency currently has a Motor Unit (with four cycles), a Canine Unit (with two dogs), a Special Investigations Unit, a Criminal Investigations Unit, School Resource Officers (two), Community Resource Officers (two located at sub-stations), bicycle officers, a Dispatch Center, and fields a joint SWAT team with Whitehall Police. RPD has been an innovator in central Ohio. The agency's primary community outreach program is its Illumination Project, borrowed from the City of Charleston Police Department. Each month, the RPD hosts a Q&A sessions with the chief or other officials. RPD was the first agency in central Ohio to begin a security camera registration program, allowing RPD detectives to quickly ascertain potential leads. Other changes implemented in 2019 include a cold case review, body worn cameras, a bias analysis, and a lateral hiring program.

== Notable people ==
- Aman Ali, comedian and storyteller
- Le'Veon Bell, football player for Michigan State and Kansas City Chiefs
- Calvin Booth, former professional basketball player and general manager of the Denver Nuggets
- Ashton Dulin, football player for Malone University and Indianapolis Colts
- Eric Fryer, Major League Baseball catcher for St. Louis Cardinals
- Mike Matheny, St. Louis Cardinals manager and three-time MLB Golden Glove winner
- Bow Wow, rapper and actor
