= Cornell School =

Historic one-room school in Alexandra, Ohio

Coordinates: 40°08′46″N 82°40′42″W

The Cornell School, is a historic one-room schoolhouse that served the children of farm families near Alexandria, Ohio, from 1886 to 1923. It has since been moved to Johnstown, Ohio, where it serves as a historical museum. Globally, one-room schoolhouses had a profound influence on literacy, critical thinking, and education of children in rural areas throughout the 18th, 19th, and 20th centuries. They stand as a reminder of the heritage, culture, and history of the places they occupy and, in many cases, helped develop social and democratic institutions. The Cornell School exemplified this specific educational system. The school was preserved by the Friends of Cornell School and belongs to National Schoolhouse Registry.

== One-room schoolhouses in the Ohio Valley ==
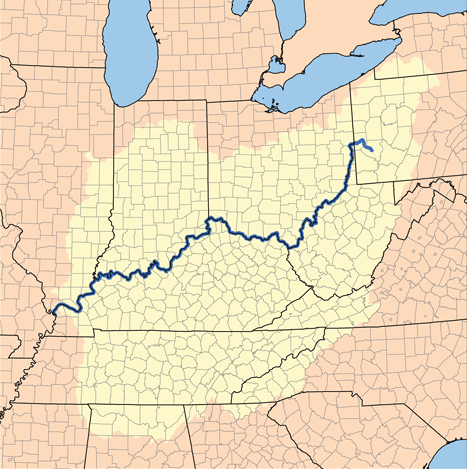
Ohio River Watershed. I, based on USGS data, 21 June 2006 (original upload date)

In the United States specifically, one-room schoolhouses fulfilled Thomas Jefferson's desire to have primary and secondary levels of education available for everyone. These school houses were typically operated by a single teacher who taught multiple grades in one large classroom. In the late 19th and early 20th centuries, many individuals who lived in the Ohio Valley, believed in the importance of one-room schoolhouses. They supported the education of youth with a basic curriculum involving reading, writing, and arithmetic.

Students of varied ages and educational backgrounds joined in one-room schoolhouses, which made it challenging for teachers to accommodate students with lessons that matched everyone's abilities. Many children in the Ohio Valley had to battle inclement weather during the winter or rainfall throughout the schoolyear when traveling to class. This, along with obligations to help their families with housework or farming duties, prevented many children in this region from attending class regularly.

== History of Cornell School ==
After the Northwest Ordinance of 1787 was passed by Congress, one-room schoolhouses (like the Cornell School) were widely established across the Ohio Valley. The Cornell School was built in Licking County, Ohio in 1886, and a school district in the St. Albans Township was created around it. The Cornell School was attended by children inhabiting the rural areas within the borders of the newly established school district, and eachers were often young, uneducated women or famers who were paid meager salaries in return for their efforts.

Students who attended the Cornell School could receive a flexible education based on their skill level. Younger students who were more advanced could sit with the older children, while the older students who did not excel could sit with the younger children. In 1923, the Cornell School closed due to the consolidation of rural schools.

== Ownership and restoration efforts ==
After it closed, the Cornell School was used as a grain storage building. However, in 1987, a community organization called Friends of Cornell School initiated a campaign to relocate and restore the school. In 1991, the local school district allocated land in Johnstown for the school's reestablishment, and the Cornell School reopened as a museum. Today, the Cornell School stands at 453 South Main Street in Johnstown, Ohio, on property owned by the Johnstown-Monroe School District.

== As a museum ==
Presently, the Cornell School provides a unique historical learning experience called "A Day in the Life at Cornell School". By immersing students in a 19th-century school day, the program is intended to help build an appreciation for the past. The museum displays donated "19th-century texts and furnishings, including quill pens, inkwells, slates, and water buckets" to recreate a classic one-room schoolhouse, and also provides an authentic environment through volunteer "schoolmarms" who lead the classes. Teachers who accompany their class are asked to remain separate from the experience, only stepping in if necessary.

The Cornell School's immersive approach to educating visitors through a series of educational history lessons allows individuals to delve into the life of a student. Students in the 3rd to 5th grade range have the chance to learn about the history of traditional stoves and watch historical skits, including a firsthand account from a former student named Charlotte Smoots. They have the opportunity to play traditional games like tag and hanky. Once the day is over, students are dismissed and are equipped with a better understanding of what the Cornell School was like when in use.

== National Schoolhouse Registry ==
On May 1, 2024, the Cornell School was added to the National Schoolhouse Registry administered by the Country School Association of America (CSAA). CSAA supports the preservation of historic schools, research on education, and the creation of museums and living history programs, and its National Schoolhouse Registry is notable for recognizing and preserving historic educational sites and serving as a resource for understanding America's rural education heritage. As a CSAA landmark and member of the National Schoolhouse Registry list, the Cornell School promotes historical education and community engagement, aligning with efforts to conserve rural educational experiences.
