= Beechwood Trails, Ohio =

- Census-designated place
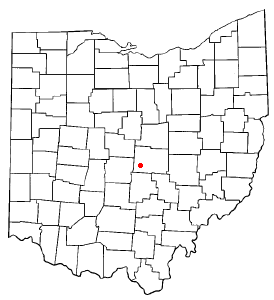
- Location of Beechwood Trails, Ohio
- Coordinates: 40°01′34″N 82°38′03″W
- Country: United States
- State: Ohio
- County: Licking
- Township: Harrison

Area
  - Total: 3.57 sq mi (9.25 km^{2})
  - Land: 3.56 sq mi (9.21 km^{2})
  - Water: 0.012 sq mi (0.03 km^{2})
- Elevation: 1,224 ft (373 m)

Population (2020)
  - Total: 3,276
  - Density: 921/sq mi (355.6/km^{2})
- Time zone: UTC-5 (Eastern (EST))
  - Summer (DST): UTC-4 (EDT)
- ZIP Code: 43062 (Pataskala)
- FIPS code: 39-05013
- GNIS feature ID: 2393334

Beechwood Trails is a census-designated place (CDP) in Harrison Township, Licking County, Ohio, United States. The population was 3,276 at the 2020 census.

== Geography ==
Beechwood Trails is located in southwestern Licking County in the northwest part of Harrison Township. It is bordered to the south and west by the city of Pataskala.

Ohio State Route 16 forms the southeast border of the CDP and leads east-northeast 14 miles (23 km) to Newark, the Licking county seat, and west-southwest 20 miles (32 km) to Columbus. State Route 310 forms the western border of the CDP; it leads north 9 miles (14 km) to Johnstown and south 2 miles (3 km) to the center of Pataskala and 5 miles (8 km) to Interstate 70 on the south side of Etna.

According to the United States Census Bureau, the CDP has a total area of 3.6 square miles (9.2 km^{2}), of which 0.01 square miles (0.03 km^{2}), or 0.38%, are water.

== Demographics ==
Historical population
| Census | Pop. | Note | %± |
|---|---|---|---|
| 2020 | 3,276 | | — |
U.S. Decennial Census

=== 2020 census ===
As of the 2020 census, Beechwood Trails had a population of 3,276. The median age was 45.5 years. 23.1% of residents were under the age of 18 and 18.3% of residents were 65 years of age or older. For every 100 females there were 100.4 males, and for every 100 females age 18 and over there were 99.4 males age 18 and over.

69.1% of residents lived in urban areas, while 30.9% lived in rural areas.

There were 1,155 households in Beechwood Trails, of which 31.3% had children under the age of 18 living in them. Of all households, 73.9% were married-couple households, 9.8% were households with a male householder and no spouse or partner present, and 10.9% were households with a female householder and no spouse or partner present. About 14.7% of all households were made up of individuals and 8.2% had someone living alone who was 65 years of age or older.

There were 1,181 housing units, of which 2.2% were vacant. The homeowner vacancy rate was 0.5% and the rental vacancy rate was 9.8%.

Racial composition as of the 2020 census
| Race | Number | Percent |
|---|---|---|
| White | 2,921 | 89.2% |
| Black or African American | 74 | 2.3% |
| American Indian and Alaska Native | 7 | 0.2% |
| Asian | 102 | 3.1% |
| Native Hawaiian and Other Pacific Islander | 0 | 0.0% |
| Some other race | 15 | 0.5% |
| Two or more races | 157 | 4.8% |
| Hispanic or Latino (of any race) | 50 | 1.5% |

=== 2000 census ===
At the 2000 census there were 2,258 people, 753 households, and 679 families living in the CDP. The population density was 653.8 inhabitants per square mile (252.4/km^{2}). There were 766 housing units at an average density of 221.8 per square mile (85.6/km^{2}). The racial makeup of the CDP was 96.68% White, 1.20% African American, 0.31% Native American, 0.49% Asian, 0.04% from other races, and 1.28% from two or more races. Hispanic or Latino of any race were 0.62%.

Of the 753 households 43.8% had children under the age of 18 living with them, 85.0% were married couples living together, 3.3% had a female householder with no husband present, and 9.8% were non-families. 7.3% of households were one person and 1.3% were one person aged 65 or older. The average household size was 3.00 and the average family size was 3.17.

The age distribution was 29.0% under the age of 18, 5.8% from 18 to 24, 31.3% from 25 to 44, 29.4% from 45 to 64, and 4.5% 65 or older. The median age was 37 years. For every 100 females there were 102.1 males. For every 100 females age 18 and over, there were 100.5 males.

The median household income was $72,760 and the median family income was $75,555. Males had a median income of $49,615 versus $33,929 for females. The per capita income for the CDP was $24,027. None of the families and 1.2% of the population were living below the poverty line, including no under eighteens and none of those over 64.
