= Etna, Ohio =

Etna, Ohio may refer to:

- Etna, Lawrence County, Ohio
- Etna, Licking County, Ohio
- Etna Township, Licking County, Ohio
