= Ohio State Route 310 =

State highway in central Ohio, US

State Route 310

Route information
- Maintained by ODOT
- Length: 13.97 mi (22.48 km)
- Existed: 1932–present

Major junctions
- South end: SR 204 near Etna
- I-70 in Etna; US 40 in Etna
- North end: SR 37 near Johnstown

Location
- Country: United States
- State: Ohio
- Counties: Fairfield, Licking

Highway system
- Ohio State Highway System; Interstate; US; State; Scenic
← SR 309	→ SR 311

State Route 310 (SR 310) is a north–south state route in the central portion of Ohio. The highway extends 13.99 miles (22.51 km) from its southern terminus at SR 204 south of the hamlet of Etna to the northern terminus at SR 37 approximately two miles (3.2 km) southeast of Johnstown.

== Route description ==
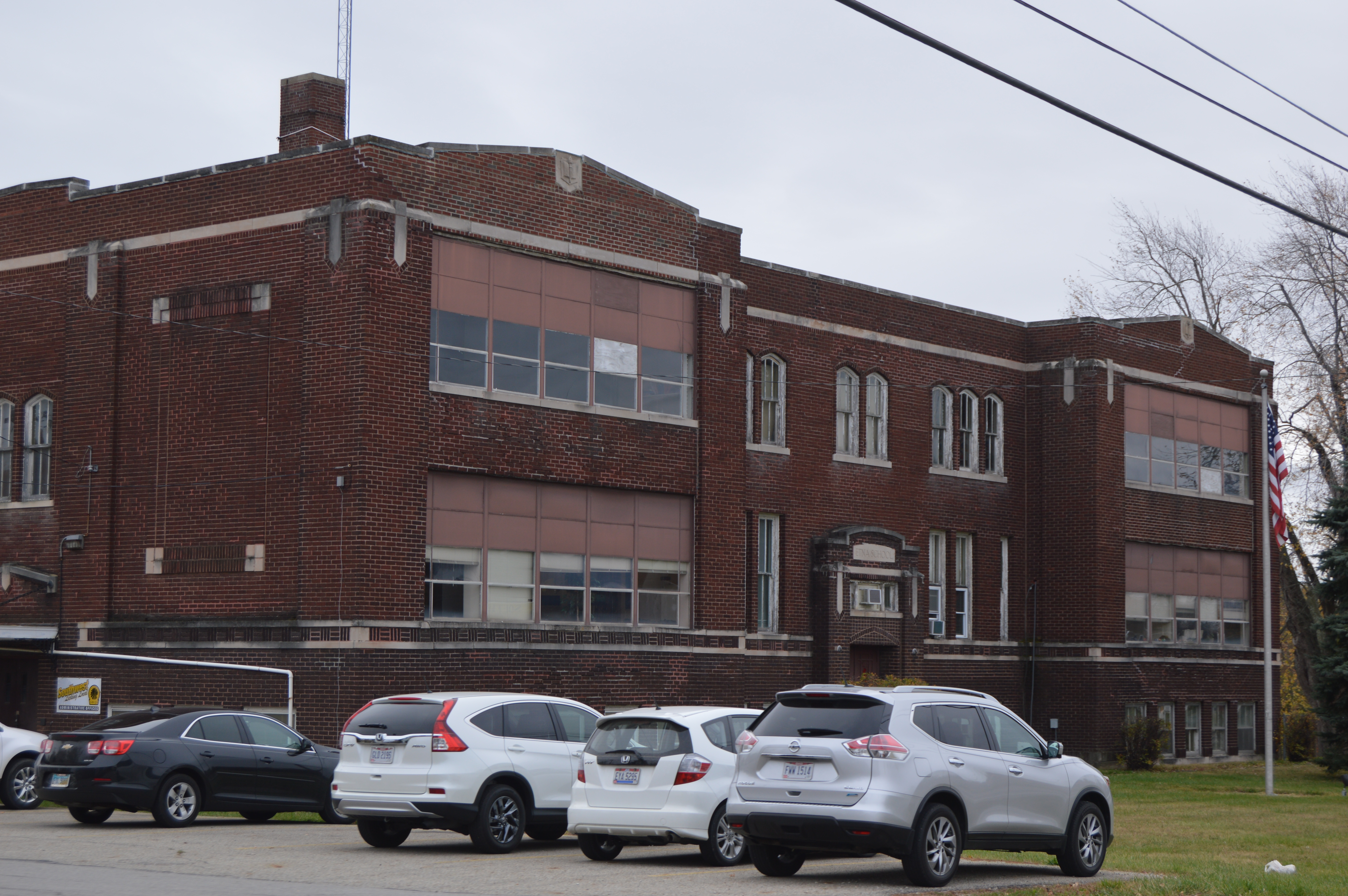
Former school at Etna

SR 310 starts at a T-intersection with SR 204 in Liberty Township in rural northern Fairfield County. A little more than one-half mile (0.80 km) north of SR 204, SR 310 meets Palmer Road, which straddles the Fairfield–Licking county line. Less than one-mile (1.6 km) after crossing into Licking County's Etna Township, SR 310 arrives at a diamond interchange with Interstate 70 (I-70).

North of I-70, SR 310 enters into the hamlet of Etna, passing by a few residential streets before arriving at a signalized intersection with the four-lane divided U.S. Route 40 (US 40). For the next mile, SR 310 passes by a mix of residential subdivisions and open fields. At the Refugee Road intersection, SR 310 enters Pataskala. SR 310 continues to traverse both houses and open space for approximately the next 1.5 miles (2.4 km). At that point, SR 310 continues into Pataskala along Main Street through a heavily residential portion of the city, en route to intersecting SR 16.

Meeting SR 16 (Broad Street) at a T-intersection, SR 310 turns east and follows SR 16 for one block, to the Township Road intersection. There, SR 310 resumes its northerly trek, and passes along the eastern edge of Broadview Golf Course, through the County Road 28 intersection. North of there, SR 310 enters a more rural setting, while serving as the eastern city limits of Pataskala. Through this area, SR 310 continues to pass by the occasional residential subdivision. SR 310 passes through a "staggered" intersection Hollow Road, then upon meeting Township Highway 148, SR 310 becomes the boundary between Jersey Township and St. Albans Township. Continuing through farmland, with scattered houses along the way, SR 310 arrives at the Morse Road (County Road 25) intersection. Further north, SR 310 goes by the Willow Run Golf Course. At the northeast corner of that golfing facility, SR 310 meets SR 161.

Northerly from SR 161, SR 310 turns entirely into St. Albans Township, now traversing a mix of woods and open space, while passing the occasional residence. Through this stretch, SR 310 intersects Jersey Mill Road (County Road 91), Jug Street (County Road 22) and County Road 33, and crosses over the Raccoon Creek. SR 310 then passes into Licking County's Liberty Township before arriving at its northern terminus at SR 37.

== History ==
When established in 1932, SR 310 existed entirely within Licking County. At the time, it only extended across the portion of its current routing from US 40 in Etna to SR 16 in Pataskala.

In 1937, SR 310 underwent extensions at both the southern and northern ends of the route. To the south, SR 310 was extended into Fairfield County to its current southern terminus at a then newly extended SR 204. North of Pataskala, SR 310 was designated along a previously un-numbered road up to a junction with SR 37 southeast of Johnstown.

== Major intersections ==
County	Location	mi	km	Destinations	Notes
Fairfield	Liberty Township	0.00	0.00	SR 204 (Blacklick Road NW)	
Licking	Etna Township	1.44– 1.66	2.32– 2.67	I-70 – Columbus, Wheeling	Exit 118 (I-70)
Licking	Etna Township	2.23	3.59	US 40 (National Pike) – Reynoldsburg, Kirkersville	
Licking	Pataskala	5.35	8.61	SR 16 west (West Broad Street) – Columbus	Southern end of SR 16 concurrency
Licking	Pataskala	5.46	8.79	SR 16 east (East Broad Street) – Newark	Northern end of SR 16 concurrency
Licking	Jersey–St. Albans township line	10.65– 10.82	17.14– 17.41	SR 161 – Granville, New Albany	Interchange
Licking	Liberty Township	13.97	22.48	SR 37 (Johnstown-Alexandria Road) – Johnstown, Alexandria	
1.000 mi = 1.609 km; 1.000 km = 0.621 mi: Concurrency terminus
