= Granville Township, Ohio =

Granville Township, Ohio, may refer to:

- Granville Township, Licking County, Ohio
- Granville Township, Mercer County, Ohio
