= South Granville =

South Granville may refer to:

- South Granville, New South Wales
- South Granville, New York, a hamlet within Granville, New York
- South Granville Rise, Vancouver

== See also ==
- Granville South, Ohio
- Granville (disambiguation)
