= Union Township, Licking County, Ohio =

Township in Ohio, US

- Township
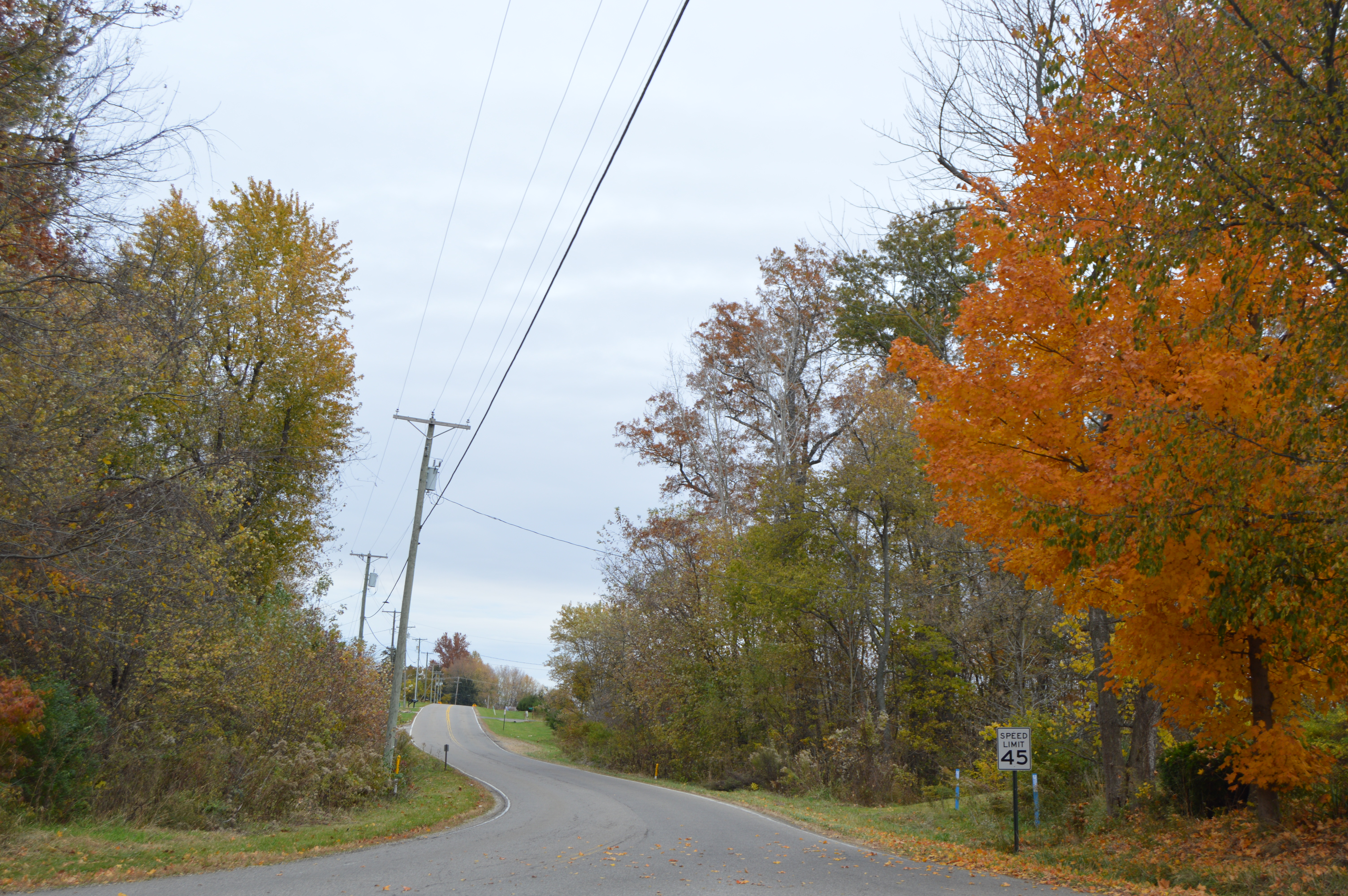
- Autumn colors on Mill Dam Road

- Location in Licking County
- Coordinates: 39°57′45″N 82°30′13″W
- Country: United States
- State: Ohio
- County: Licking

Area
  - Total: 42.3 sq mi (109.5 km^{2})
  - Land: 41.7 sq mi (107.9 km^{2})
  - Water: 0.62 sq mi (1.6 km^{2})
- Elevation: 899 ft (274 m)

Population (2020)
  - Total: 9,130
  - Density: 219/sq mi (84.6/km^{2})
- Time zone: UTC-5 (Eastern (EST))
  - Summer (DST): UTC-4 (EDT)
- FIPS code: 39-78400
- GNIS feature ID: 1086479
- Website: www.uniontownship-licking.com

Union Township is one of the 25 townships of Licking County, Ohio, United States. As of the 2020 census the population was 9,130.

== Geography ==
Located on the southern edge of the county, it borders the following townships and city:

- Granville Township - north
- Newark - northeast
- Heath - northeast
- Licking Township - east
- Thorn Township, Perry County - southeast corner
- Buckeye Lake - southeast
- Walnut Township, Fairfield County - south
- Liberty Township, Fairfield County - southwest corner
- Harrison Township - west
- St. Albans Township - northwest corner

Several municipalities are located in Union Township:

- Part of the village of Buckeye Lake, in the southeast
- The village of Hebron, in the east

== Name and history ==
It is one of 27 Union Townships statewide.

== Government ==
The township is governed by a three-member board of trustees, who are elected in November of odd-numbered years to a four-year term beginning on the following January 1. Two are elected in the year after the presidential election and one is elected in the year before it. There is also an elected township fiscal officer, who serves a four-year term beginning on April 1 of the year after the election, which is held in November of the year before the presidential election. Vacancies in the fiscal officership or on the board of trustees are filled by the remaining trustees.
