= Harrison Township, Licking County, Ohio =

Township in Ohio, US

- Township
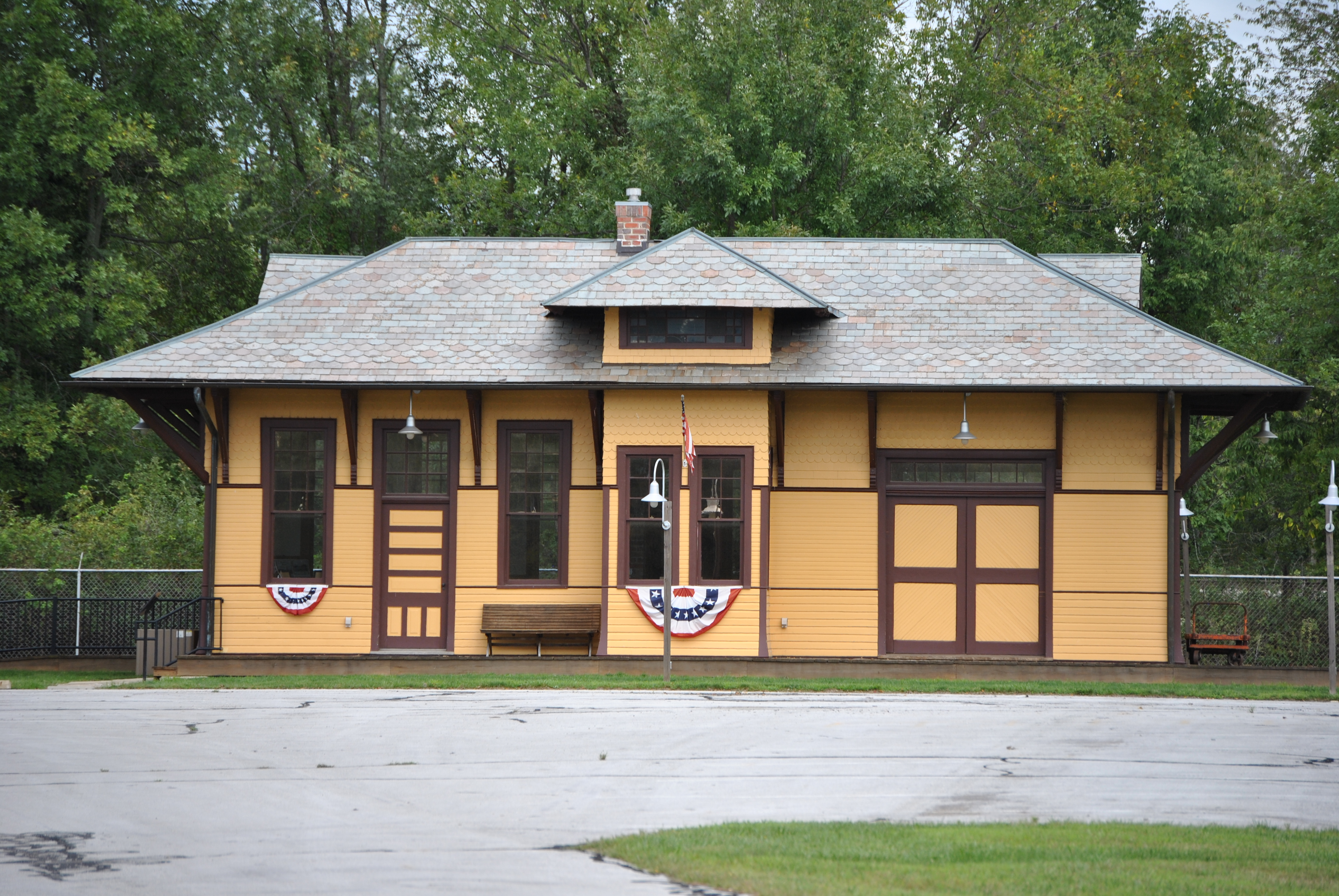
- The Outville Depot

- Location of Harrison Township in Licking County
- Coordinates: 39°59′32″N 82°37′12″W
- Country: United States
- State: Ohio
- County: Licking

Area
  - Total: 27.5 sq mi (71.1 km^{2})
  - Land: 27.3 sq mi (70.8 km^{2})
  - Water: 0.12 sq mi (0.3 km^{2})
- Elevation: 1,106 ft (337 m)

Population (2020)
  - Total: 8,520
  - Density: 312/sq mi (120/km^{2})
- Time zone: UTC-5 (Eastern (EST))
  - Summer (DST): UTC-4 (EDT)
- FIPS code: 39-33894
- GNIS feature ID: 1086461
- Website: www.harrisontownship.net

Harrison Township is one of the 25 townships of Licking County, Ohio, United States. As of the 2020 census the population was 8,520.

== Geography ==
Located on the southern edge of the county, it borders the following townships and city:

- St. Albans Township - north
- Granville Township - northeast corner
- Union Township - east
- Walnut Township, Fairfield County - southeast corner
- Liberty Township, Fairfield County - south
- Etna Township - southwest
- Pataskala - west
- Jersey Township - northwest corner

Several populated places are located in Harrison Township:

- The village of Kirkersville, in the south
- The census-designated place of Beechwood Trails, in the northwest

== Name and history ==
It is one of nineteen Harrison Townships statewide.

== Government ==
The township is governed by a three-member board of trustees, who are elected in November of odd-numbered years to a four-year term beginning on the following January 1. Two are elected in the year after the presidential election and one is elected in the year before it. There is also an elected township fiscal officer, who serves a four-year term beginning on April 1 of the year after the election, which is held in November of the year before the presidential election. Vacancies in the fiscal officership or on the board of trustees are filled by the remaining trustees.
