= William E. Castle =

American geneticist

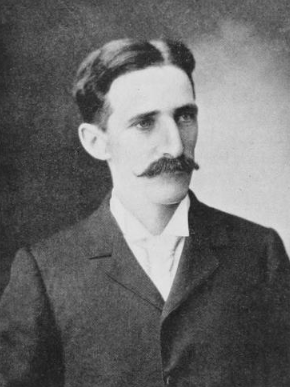
- c. 1899
- Born: October 25, 1867; Alexandria, Ohio, US
- Died: June 3, 1962 (aged 94); Berkeley, California, US
- Education: Denison University, Harvard University
- Known for: Anticipation of the Hardy–Weinberg law; use of Drosophila melanogaster for genetic studies
- Spouse: Clara Sears Bosworth
- Children: Three sons, including William B. Castle
- Awards: Kimber Genetics Award of the National Academy of Sciences
- Scientific career
- Fields: Genetics of mammals (especially the guinea pig) and insects (Drosophila melanogaster)
- Institutions: University of Wisconsin–Madison, Knox College, Harvard University, University of California, Berkeley
- Notable students: Sewall Wright, William Curtis Farabee

William Ernest Castle (October 25, 1867 – June 3, 1962) was an early American geneticist.

== Early years ==
William Ernest Castle was born on a farm in Alexandria, Ohio and took an early interest in natural history. He graduated in 1889 from Denison University in Granville, Ohio, a Baptist college that emphasized classics, and went on to become a teacher of Latin at Ottawa University in Ottawa, Kansas, where he published his first paper on the flowering plants of the area. After three years of teaching, botany won out over Latin.

== Education ==
Castle entered the senior class of Harvard University in 1892 and in 1893 took a second A.B. degree with honors. He was appointed laboratory assistant in zoology, an A.M. degree in 1894 and a Ph.D. in 1895. He then taught zoology at the University of Wisconsin–Madison and at Knox College in Galesburg, Illinois, each for a year.

== Harvard and Drosophila ==
Castle returned to Harvard in 1897. His early work focused on embryology, but after the rediscovery of Mendelian genetics in 1900, he turned to mammalian genetics, especially that of the guinea pig. That same year, he was elected to the American Academy of Arts and Sciences.

In 1903 Castle intervened in the debate on mathematical foundations of Mendelian genetics. He corrected some tentative work of Udny Yule on breeding by deliberate selection and genetics. In so doing, he anticipated what has now become known as the Hardy–Weinberg law. Formulated in the terms "as soon as selection is arrested the race remains stable at the degree of purity then attained", it appeared in his paper of November that year.

At Harvard, Charles W. Woodworth suggested to Castle that Drosophila might be used for genetical work. Castle was the first to use the fruit fly Drosophila melanogaster, and it was his work that inspired T.H. Morgan to use Drosophila and the basis of Morgan's 1933 Nobel Prize.

== Bussey Institution ==
In 1908 Castle moved from the Harvard Museum of Comparative Zoology to the Bussey Institution for Applied Biology. He was elected to the American Philosophical Society in 1910. At Harvard, his most famous PhD student was Sewall Wright who graduated in 1915. The same year he was elected to membership in the U.S. National Academy of Sciences. When the Eugenics Record Office was founded in 1912, he served as a member of its scientific advisory board, and in 1916 he was one of the 10 founders of the scientific journal Genetics.

His work with hooded rats provided important evidence that evolution could occur by the action of selection on small variations in traits. Other biologists (including T. H. Huxley and William Bates) had doubted Darwin's belief in the sufficiency of small variations (acted upon by natural selection over long periods of time) to explain evolution. He realized that the traits acted upon could be multifactorial. (2)

== Later years ==
Castle retired from Harvard in 1936 when the Bussey Institution closed, and took up a position at the University of California, Berkeley, as Research Associate in mammalian genetics. In 1955 he was awarded the Kimber Genetics Award of the U.S. National Academy of Sciences. His last of 242 papers was published in 1961 when he was 91 years old.

He died in Berkeley, California on June 3, 1962.

== Family ==
In 1896, Castle married Clara Sears Bosworth, and they had three sons, one of whom died as a teenager. The others became professors at Harvard, William B. Castle of medicine, and the younger Edward Castle, of plant physiology.
