= William Curtis Farabee =

American geneticist (1865–1925)

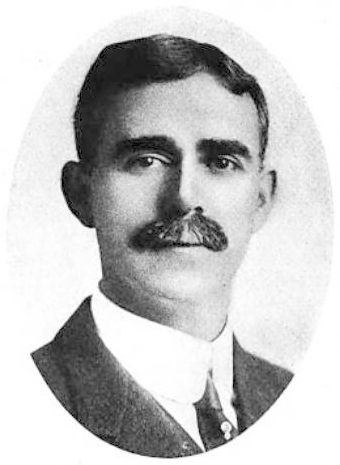
- Born: February 7, 1865; Washington County, Pennsylvania
- Died: June 25, 1925 (aged 60); Washington, Pennsylvania
- Education: Pennsylvania Western University, California, Waynesburg College, Harvard University
- Known for: Demonstrating Mendelian inheritance in humans; Indian Tribes of Eastern Peru
- Spouse: Sylvia Manilla Holdren (m. 1897)
- Scientific career
- Fields: Physical anthropology, human genetics
- Thesis: Heredity and Sexual Influences In Meristic Variation: A Study of Digital Malformations in Man
- Doctoral advisor: William E. Castle

William Curtis Farabee (1865–1925) was an American anthropologist who was the second individual to obtain a doctorate in physical anthropology from Harvard University. He engaged in a wide range of anthropological work during his time as a professor at Harvard and then as a researcher at the University Museum, Philadelphia, but is best known for his work in human genetics and his ethnographic and geographic work in South America.

== Early life and education ==
William Curtis Farabee was born in Washington County, Pennsylvania on February 7, 1865. He attended public schools, and enrolled at the California State Normal School from 1885 to 1887. He was an 1894 graduate of Waynesburg College.

He married Sylvia Manilla Holdren in 1897.

== Genetics research ==
Farabee demonstrated that Mendelian genetics operate in man. The founder of genetics, Gregor Mendel, published the results of his studies on pea plants and heredity in 1865. The work of Mendel was not recognized for its importance until it was rediscovered in 1900. During the intervening 35 years, the "discovery of chromosomes and their behavior in cell division and gametogenesis, and intensive study of cell biological variation, and…a conceptual framework for a theory of heredity, development, and evolution" all came about. "The time was ripe for Mendelism" according to Stern. Mendel had been interested in seeing if his work with dominant and recessive characteristics was applicable to men, but it was Farabee's work that confirmed this and helped found the study of human genetics.

Farabee was a student of William E. Castle at Harvard. His dissertation, entitled Heredity and Sexual Influences In Meristic Variation: A Study of Digital Malformations in Man, was published in 1903. The bulk of his research was regarding a hereditary conditions that primarily afflicts the hands of individuals, entitled Brachydactyly.

Brachydactyly is a dominant genetic trait that is characterized by shortened fingers and shortened stature. Farabee noticed that this trait ran in families. For his dissertation research, Farabee chose a family affected by this trait and followed their pedigree back five generations. By doing so he showed that the ratio of those with and without brachydactyly followed a pattern explained by Mendel's pattern of inheritance. The children of an abnormal (A) individual, and a normal (N) individual, had a close to fifty percent chance of being abnormal. Farabee stated that an abnormal individual typically would have a genotype of AN, and the family's practice of exogamy meant that their spouse would have a genotype of NN. By crossing the two, ANxNN, the offspring could be normal or abnormal with an equal chance of either. Because the trait is dominant, if an individual does not carry the trait, they are homozygous normal and have no risk of passing the trait on to their children, which Farabee also studied in his pedigrees.

Farabee also published on the occurrence of recessive traits in humans. While in the South, he met several albino African-American individuals, and after inquiring into their family background, noticed that the albino trait followed the 3:1 ratio in the second generation that is typical of recessive genotypes.

== Travels in South America ==
Following his work in genetics, Farabee began working in South America. His goal was to record the cultural diversity and obtain items for the Penn Museum of Archaeology and Anthropology in Philadelphia, where he was employed as a researcher and curator. He made three trips to the Amazon basin, each lasting several years.

While in South America, Farabee traveled into very remote regions. He helped to fill in maps of locations where there had not been any previous exploration. On several occasions he was the first man of European descent that the natives had seen. In other locations he witnessed the atrocities that were taking places by slave hunters, such as the story of Simasiri, a translator for the expedition, who witnessed his family sold into slavery or killed by the traders.

The notes taken by Farabee were regarding the many different aspects of the cultures he encountered, such as dance, cosmology, marriage, dress, and particularly their varying languages. They are detailed accounts, and were often obtained from the villagers themselves. The ethnologies followed a set outline of characteristics to record, but in spite of this there is a great deal of personal detail and rich account of the people.

While in South America, Farabee noted the archaeological sites encountered. He collected artifacts for the Museum and shipped them to Philadelphia. His collection of pottery, beadwork, clothing, ornaments, and other artifacts represents cultural diversity.

The volumes that Farabee produced from his travels include Indian Tribes of Eastern Peru based on his first trip in 1906–1908. His second trip, from 1913–1916, is retold in The Central Arawaks and The Central Caribs. His final trip was in 1921–1923. Each of these books details the people he met and studied, and the cultural groups each belonged to.

Farabee held fairly modern views regarding the people that inhabited the Amazon. He felt that all cultures are a product of their environment and that there is no way to separate culture and the influence that the surrounding world has had on it. He stated that "…there are no primitive men, neither is there primitive culture," which was a novel concept at a time when man was still often viewed in terms of the size of his cranium. Although this did not preclude him from obtaining anthropometric data during his travels. Farabee went on to state that "Man has been able to profit by his knowledge of nature's laws, but he has not overcome them." This statement was also innovative because mankind was typically viewed as the apex of creation and able to overcome his natural environment. It was Farabee's experiences among individuals very much at the mercy of the rivers, forests and diseases that led him to these conclusions.

He contracted a fever during his 1913–1916 trip to South America, and suffered recurring attacks of it in the following years. Despite receiving a series of blood transfusions, he died from anemia in Washington, Pennsylvania on June 24, 1925, and was buried there at Washington Cemetery.

== Legacy ==
Within the academic community, Farabee was a respected anthropologist. He did not produce any doctorates in physical anthropology during his time teaching at Harvard, which has earned him some criticism, there may be political reasons for this. While Farabee was more interested in research than teaching, and may not have attracted students for this reason, it has been noted that Putnam may have also had a stifling effect on the department at the time. In addition to the lack of students, Farabee also faced personal insults in print, such as those he presented in a rebuttal, when he was criticized for his report on the Arawakan-speaking peoples.

Farabee was the recipient of several noteworthy awards and recognitions. He was appointed as an honorary member of the faculty at the University of San Marcos in Lima, Peru. President Hastings selected his as a member of the American Commission to the Peruvian Centennial with the rank of Envoy Extraordinary. He was elected to the American Academy of Arts and Sciences in 1911. Additionally, he was an ethnographer in the American Commission to Negotiate Peace, in Paris during 1918–1919. He was elected to the American Philosophical Society in 1919.

William Farabee was a notable member of the anthropological community. His contributions to the early field of genetics helped pave the way for future research. His explorations in South America recorded data on the cultures of the region before foreigners influenced them.
