= Etna Township Mounds =

Archaeological site in Ohio, United States

- Etna Township Mounds I And II
- U.S. National Register of Historic Places
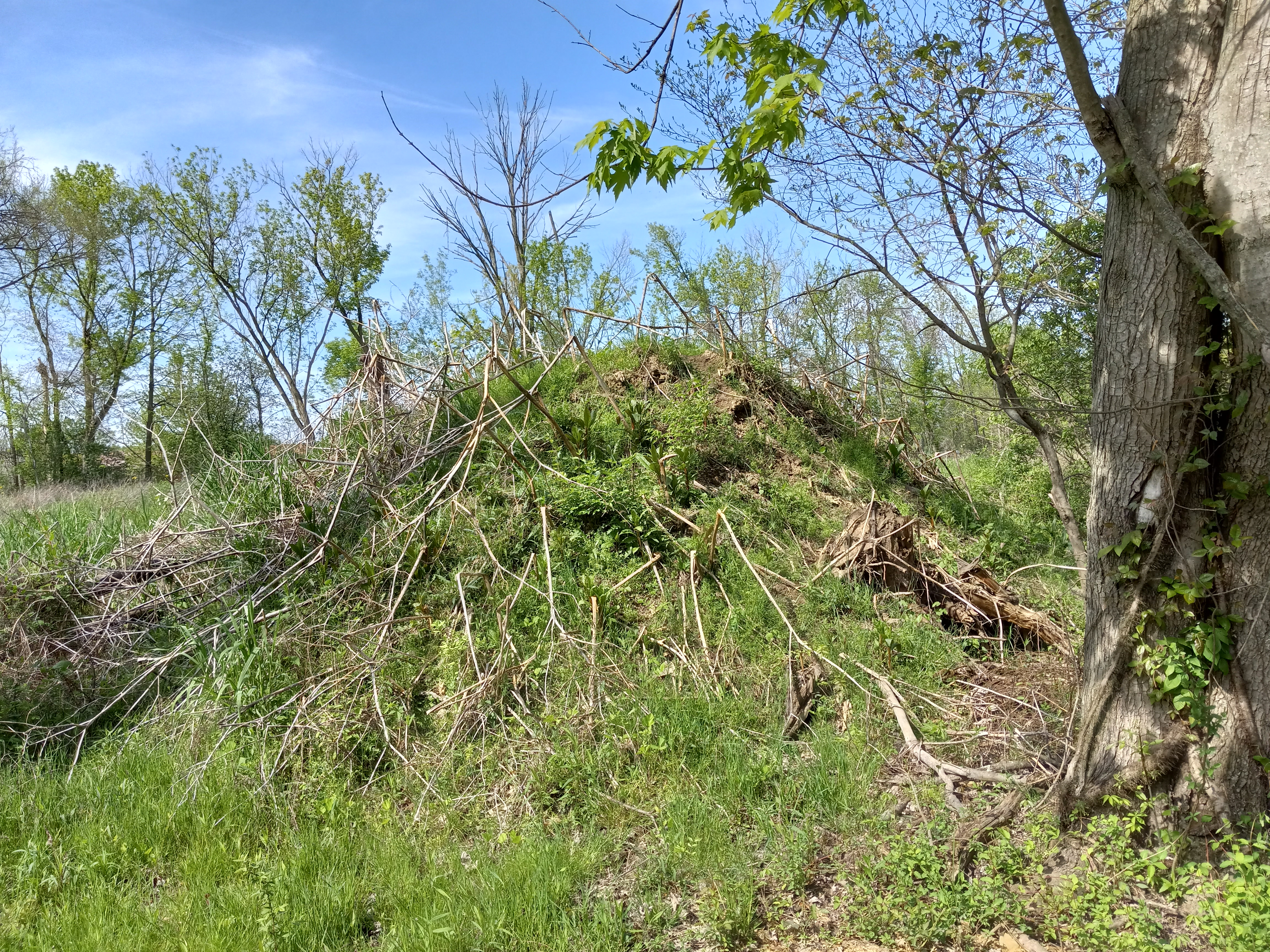
- Nearest city: Reynoldsburg, Ohio
- Area: 22.7 acres (9.2 ha)
- NRHP reference No.: 75001457
- Added to NRHP: September 5, 1975

The Etna Township Mounds are a pair of Native American mounds in Etna Township, Licking County, Ohio, United States. Located east of Reynoldsburg near Interstate 70, the mounds are built primarily of sand. Unlike typical Native American mounds, their location reveals nothing of their builders: they are not built atop hills or along a stream, as Adena mounds typically are.

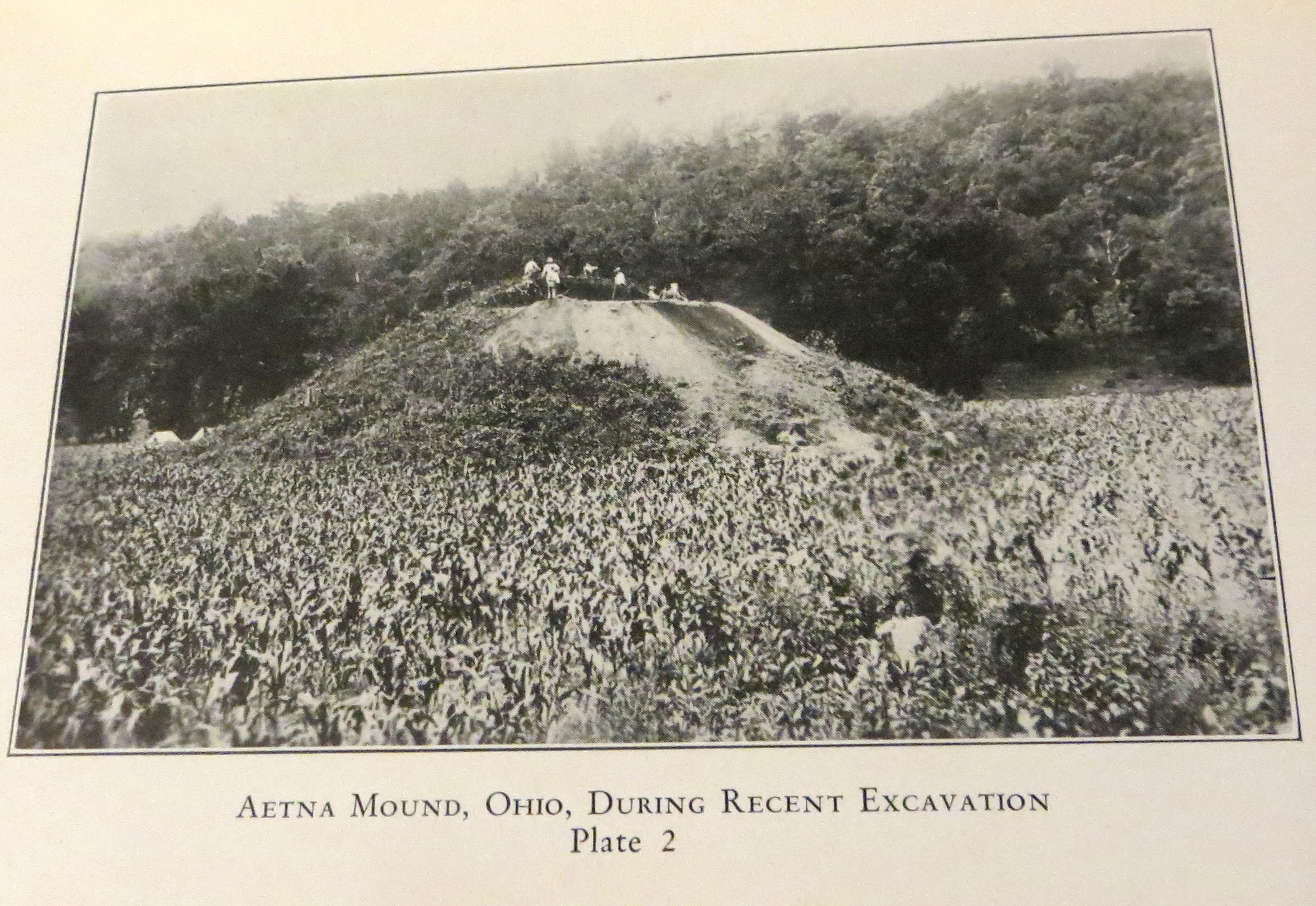
Aetna Etna Ohio Mound Archaeological Excavation from the Mormon Book Pictorial Ancient America by J.S. Grant

According to the book Pictorial Ancient America by Jay S. Grant (see photo), at least one of the mounds appears to have been archaeologically excavated in the early 1920s. At the time, the Ohio State Archaeological and Historical Society asserted, "due to recent discoveries," "It was formerly supposed that the Mound Builders were a vanished race of people who preceded the Indians in occupancy of this continent. This notion has been exploded. The builders of the mounds were ancestors of our present-day Indians"

The mounds are believed to have been constructed by one of the mound-building cultures that inhabited Ohio during the Woodland period.

It has been proposed that the mounds are the work of a group of individuals isolated from the rest of their culture. Because further excavation of the mounds is likely to yield valuable information about such isolated groups, the mounds are a potential archaeological site. In recognition of their archaeological value, the Etna Township Mounds were listed on the National Register of Historic Places in 1975.

In 2022, Etna Township Mound Number 1 (a circular mound approximately 6 feet high and ninety feet in diameter) was donated to the Archaeological Conservancy. The news article on the donation reports that Mound Number 2 had been destroyed to build a nearby housing subdivision
