= Granville Township, Licking County, Ohio =

Township in Ohio, US

- Township
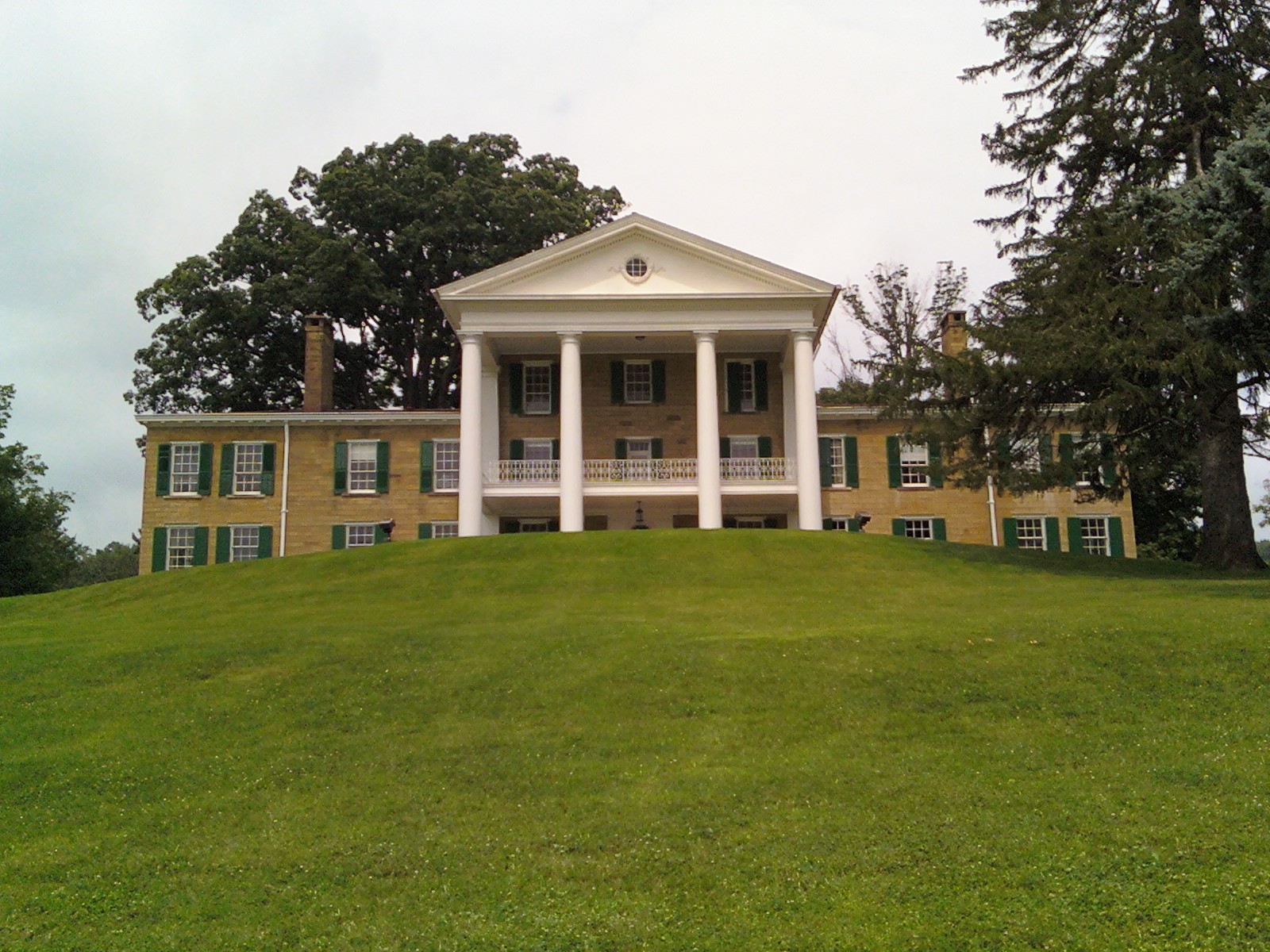
- Bryn Du Mansion

- Location of Granville Township in Licking County
- Coordinates: 40°4′15″N 82°30′56″W
- Country: United States
- State: Ohio
- County: Licking

Area
  - Total: 25.9 sq mi (67.2 km^{2})
  - Land: 25.8 sq mi (66.7 km^{2})
  - Water: 0.19 sq mi (0.5 km^{2})
- Elevation: 981 ft (299 m)

Population (2020)
  - Total: 10,244
  - Density: 398/sq mi (154/km^{2})
- Time zone: UTC-5 (Eastern (EST))
  - Summer (DST): UTC-4 (EDT)
- ZIP code: 43023
- Area code: 740
- FIPS code: 39-31416
- GNIS feature ID: 1086459
- Website: granvilletownship.org

Granville Township is one of the 25 townships of Licking County, Ohio, United States. As of the 2020 census the population was 10,244.

== Geography ==
Located in the center of the county, it borders the following townships and city:

- McKean Township - north
- Newton Township - northeast
- Newark Township - east
- Newark - southeast
- Union Township - south
- Harrison Township - southwest corner
- St. Albans Township - west
- Liberty Township - northwest corner

Several populated places are located in Granville Township:

- The village of Granville, in the east and center
- The census-designated place of Granville South, in the southwest

== Name and history ==
Granville Township is named after Granville, Massachusetts. Statewide, the only other Granville Township is located in Mercer County.

== Government ==
The township is governed by a three-member board of trustees, who are elected in November of odd-numbered years to a four-year term beginning on the following January 1. Two are elected in the year after the presidential election and one is elected in the year before it. There is also an elected township fiscal officer, who serves a four-year term beginning on April 1 of the year after the election, which is held in November of the year before the presidential election. Vacancies in the fiscal officership or on the board of trustees are filled by the remaining trustees.
