= Granville South, Ohio =

- Census-designated place
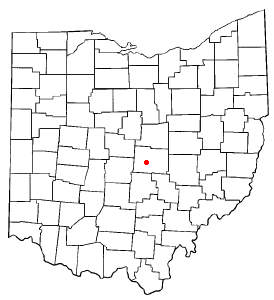
- Location of Granville South, Ohio
- Coordinates: 40°03′08″N 82°32′30″W
- Country: United States
- State: Ohio
- County: Licking
- Township: Granville

Area
  - Total: 6.14 sq mi (15.90 km^{2})
  - Land: 6.09 sq mi (15.77 km^{2})
  - Water: 0.050 sq mi (0.13 km^{2})
- Elevation: 1,050 ft (320 m)

Population (2020)
  - Total: 1,420
  - Density: 233.2/sq mi (90.03/km^{2})
- Time zone: UTC-5 (Eastern (EST))
  - Summer (DST): UTC-4 (EDT)
- ZIP Code: 43023 (Granville)
- FIPS code: 39-31434
- GNIS feature ID: 2393024

Granville South is a census-designated place (CDP) in Licking County, Ohio, United States. The population was 1,420 at the 2020 census.

== Geography ==
Granville South is located in central Licking County in the southern and southwestern part of Granville Township. It is bordered to the north by the village of Granville.

Ohio State Route 16 passes through the community, leading east 8 miles (13 km) to Newark, the county seat, and southwest 25 miles (40 km) to Columbus. State Route 37 forms the northern edge of most of the community; the highway leads northwest 21 miles (34 km) to Sunbury. State Route 37 and 161 form a freeway which leads west 20 miles (32 km) to Interstate 270 in the northeastern suburbs of Columbus.

According to the United States Census Bureau, the Granville South CDP has a total area of 6.1 square miles (15.9 km^{2}), of which 0.04 square miles (0.1 km^{2}), or 0.79%, are water. The CDP drains northeast to Raccoon Creek, an east-flowing tributary of the Licking River and part of the Muskingum River watershed flowing south to the Ohio River.

== Demographics ==
Historical population
| Census | Pop. | Note | %± |
|---|---|---|---|
| 2020 | 1,420 | | — |
U.S. Decennial Census

At the 2000 census there were 1,194 people, 424 households, and 362 families living in the CDP. The population density was 195.4 inhabitants per square mile (75.4/km^{2}). There were 433 housing units at an average density of 70.9 per square mile (27.4/km^{2}). The racial makeup of the CDP was 97.40% White, 0.08% Native American, 1.17% Asian, 0.34% from other races, and 1.01% from two or more races. Hispanic or Latino of any race were 0.67%.

Of the 424 households 41.5% had children under the age of 18 living with them, 79.5% were married couples living together, 4.7% had a female householder with no husband present, and 14.4% were non-families. 13.2% of households were one person and 6.8% were one person aged 65 or older. The average household size was 2.82 and the average family size was 3.09.

The age distribution was 28.6% under the age of 18, 4.5% from 18 to 24, 22.5% from 25 to 44, 32.6% from 45 to 64, and 11.8% 65 or older. The median age was 42 years. For every 100 females there were 91.7 males. For every 100 females age 18 and over, there were 90.0 males.

The median household income was $65,694 and the median family income was $77,301. Males had a median income of $57,202 versus $25,217 for females. The per capita income for the CDP was $27,043. None of the families and 1.3% of the population were living below the poverty line, including no under eighteens and 5.9% of those over 64.
