= Alexandria, Ohio =

- Village
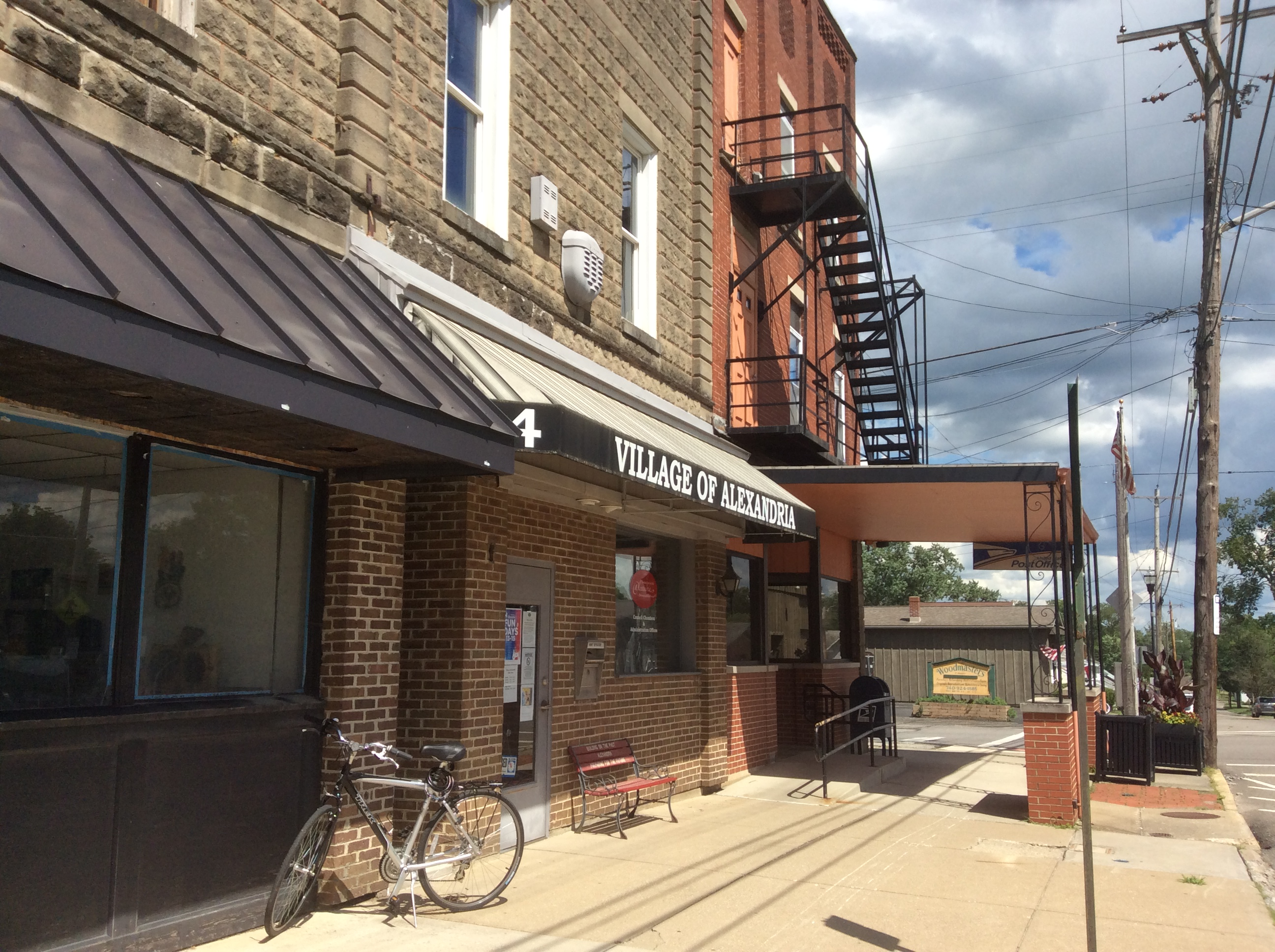
- Village Office, W. Main Street
- Nickname: Alex (pronounced "Alec")
- Motto: Building on the Past - Preparing for the Future
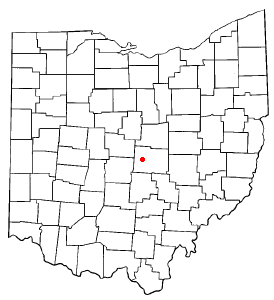
- Location of Alexandria, Ohio

- Location of Alexandria in Licking County
- Coordinates: 40°05′24″N 82°36′43″W
- Country: United States
- State: Ohio
- County: Licking

Area
  - Total: 0.24 sq mi (0.63 km^{2})
  - Land: 0.24 sq mi (0.63 km^{2})
  - Water: 0 sq mi (0.00 km^{2})
- Elevation: 978 ft (298 m)

Population (2020)
  - Total: 483
  - Estimate (2023): 490
  - Density: 1,976.2/sq mi (763.03/km^{2})
- Time zone: UTC-5 (Eastern (EST))
  - Summer (DST): UTC-4 (EDT)
- ZIP code: 43001
- Area code: 740
- FIPS code: 39-01154
- GNIS feature ID: 2397927
- Website: www.alexandriaoh.gov

Alexandria is a village in Licking County, Ohio, United States. The population was 483 at the 2020 census.

== History ==
Alexandria was laid out in 1830. The village played a role in the Underground Railroad, sheltering many escaped slaves on their way to freedom.

In 2018, village voters defeated a ballot issue to dissolve the village and become a part of St. Albans Township. The vote was 92% against the dissolution.

== Geography ==
Alexandria is located in western Licking County along State Route 37 about 6 miles (10 km) southeast of Johnstown and 25 miles (40 km) northeast of Columbus.

According to the United States Census Bureau, the village has a total area of 0.24 square miles (0.62 km^{2}), all land.

== Demographics ==
Historical population
Census	Pop.	Note	%±
1840	200		—
1850	349		74.5%
1860	320		−8.3%
1870	303		−5.3%
1880	269		−11.2%
1890	296		10.0%
1900	420		41.9%
1910	414		−1.4%
1920	415		0.2%
1930	450		8.4%
1940	425		−5.6%
1950	464		9.2%
1960	452		−2.6%
1970	588		30.1%
1980	489		−16.8%
1990	468		−4.3%
2000	485		3.6%
2010	517		6.6%
2020	483		−6.6%
2023 (est.)	490	▲	1.4%
U.S. Decennial Census

=== 2010 census ===
At the 2010 census, there were 517 people, 182 households and 144 families living in the village. The population density was 2,068.0 per square mile (798.5/km^{2}). There were 203 housing units at an average density of 812.0 per square mile (313.5/km^{2}). The racial make-up was 98.5% White, 0.6% Native American, and 1.0% from two or more races. Hispanic or Latino of any race were 1.2% of the population.

There were 182 households, of which 50.0% had children under the age of 18 living with them, 58.8% were married couples living together, 14.8% had a female householder with no husband present, 5.5% had a male householder with no wife present, and 20.9% were non-families. 15.9% of all households were made up of individuals, and 4.4% had someone living alone who was 65 years of age or older. The average household size was 2.84 and the average family size was 3.13.

The median age was 34.9 years. 30.2% of residents were under the age of 18; 7.6% were between the ages of 18 and 24; 28.3% were from 25 to 44; 22.7% were from 45 to 64; and 11.4% were 65 years of age or older. The gender makeup of the village was 49.5% male and 50.5% female.

=== 2000 census ===
At the 2000 census, there were 485 people, 29 households and 22 families living in the village. The population density was 523.1 per square mile (202.0/km^{2}). There were 30 housing units at an average density of 184.6 per square mile (71.3/km^{2}). The racial make-up was 98.82% White and 1.18% Native American. Hispanic or Latino of any race were 1.18% of the population.

There were 29 households, of which 37.9% had children under the age of 18 living with them, 72.4% were married couples living together, and 24.1% were non-families. 20.7% of all households were made up of individuals, and 13.8% had someone living alone who was 65 years of age or older. The average household size was 2.93 and the average family size was 3.45.

34.1% of the population were under the age of 18, 4.7% from 18 to 24, 32.9% from 25 to 44, 15.3% from 45 to 64, and 12.9% were 65 years of age or older. The median age was 32 years. For every 100 females there were 107.3 males. For every 100 females age 18 and over, there were 100.0 males.

The median household income was $29,688 and the median family income was $41,250. Males had a median income of $26,250 and females $0. The per capita income was $16,235. None of the population and none of the families were below the poverty line.

== Notable people ==
- William Ernest Castle (1867–1962), early geneticist, was born in Alexandria.

== Locations of interest ==
Located in town, Alexandria Public Library serves the residents of Alexandria. Fireman's Park, Lobdell Reserve, Parker Community Park and the Fritz Drumm Field of Dreams are all located in or very near the village. The Alexandria Museum, on Main Street, is a small house museum.

== Schooling ==
Residents of Alexandria and the surrounding areas attend Northridge Local School District, which includes: Northridge Elementary, Northridge Middle, and Northridge High School.

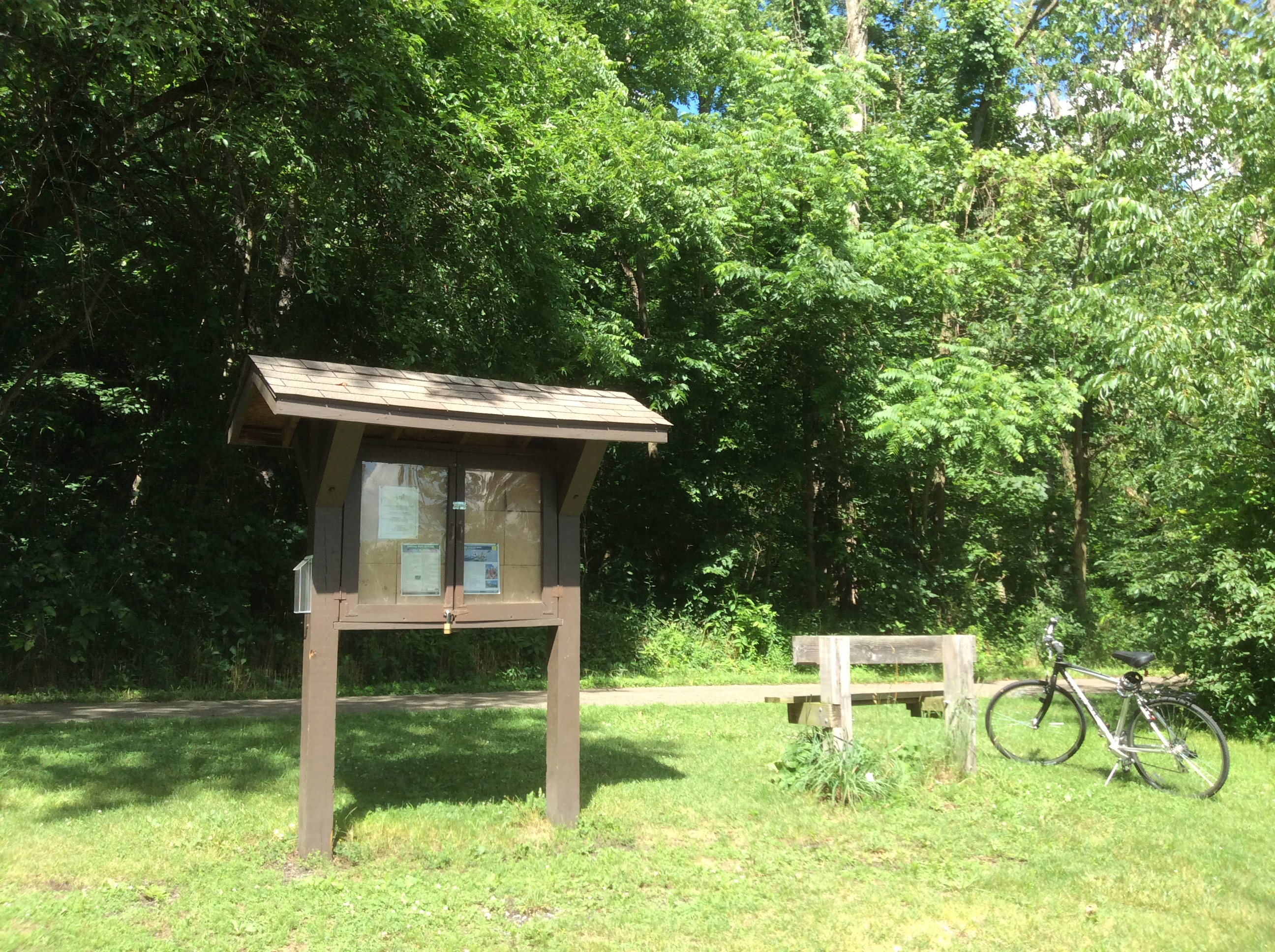
Thomas Evans Bike Trail, Depot Street

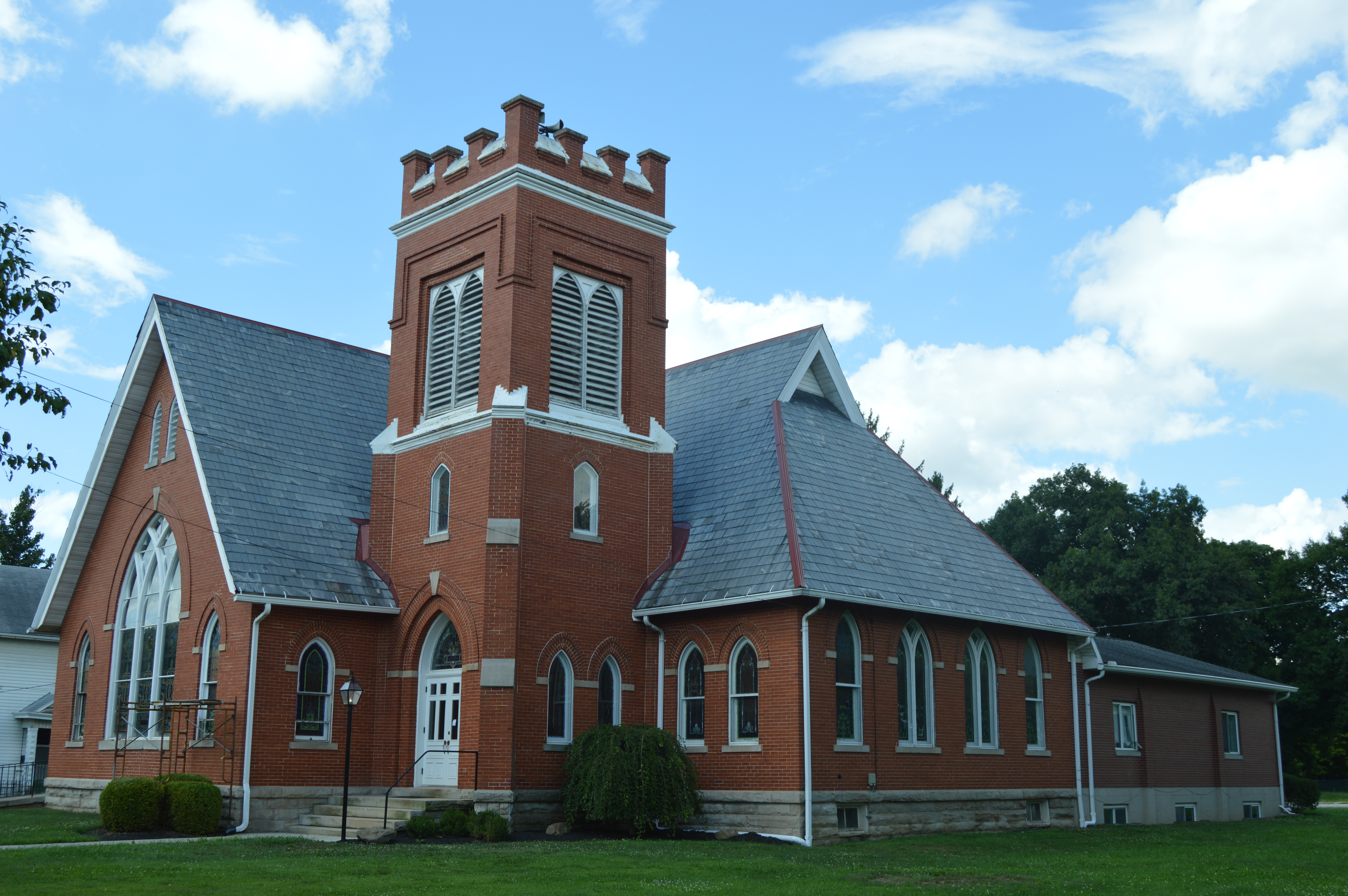
Alexandria Baptist Church from southeast

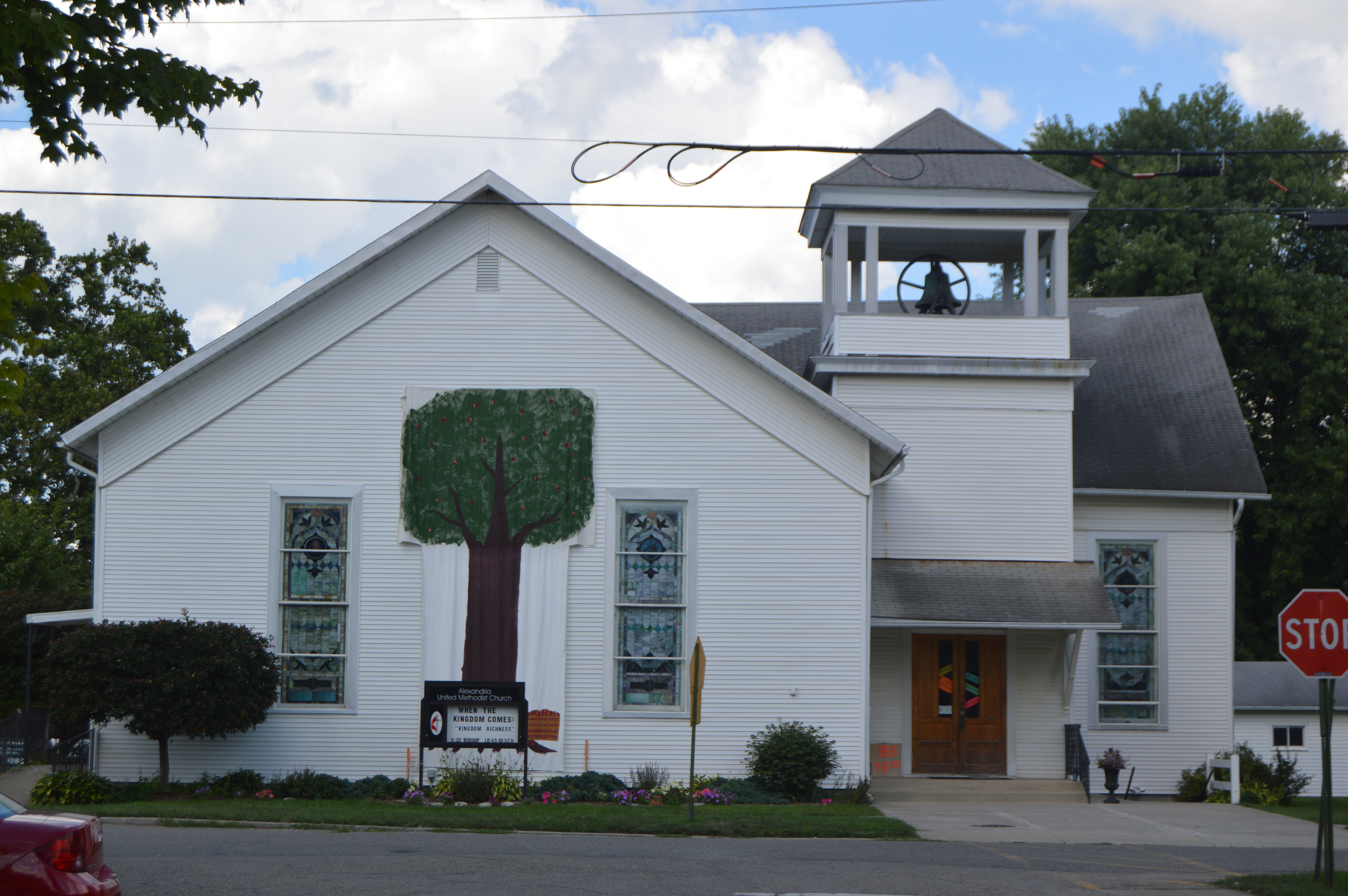
Alexandria United Methodist Church, front

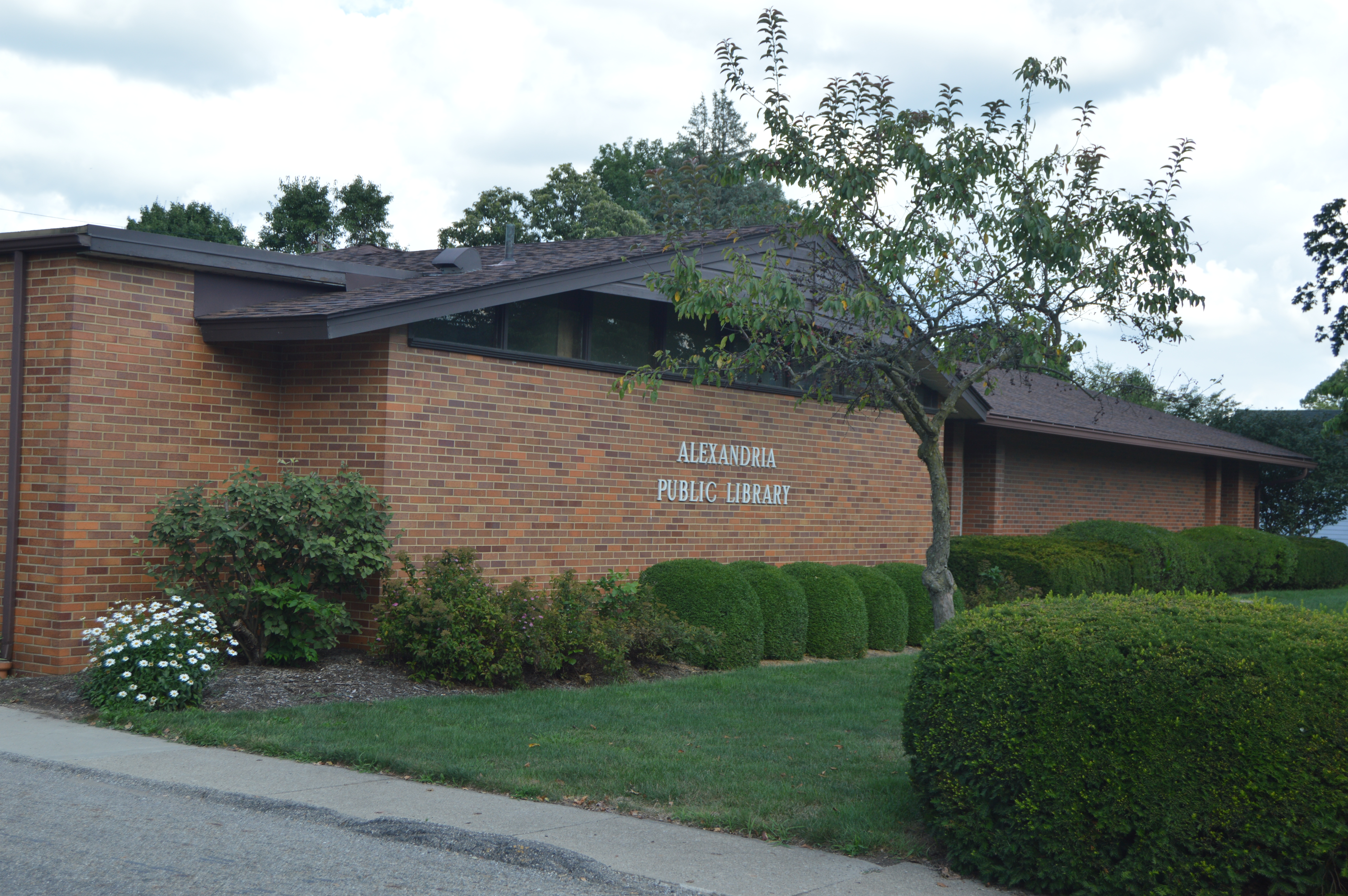
Alexandria Public Library from Maple Drive
