= Etna Township, Ohio =

Township in Ohio, US

Etna Township, Licking County, Ohio
- Township
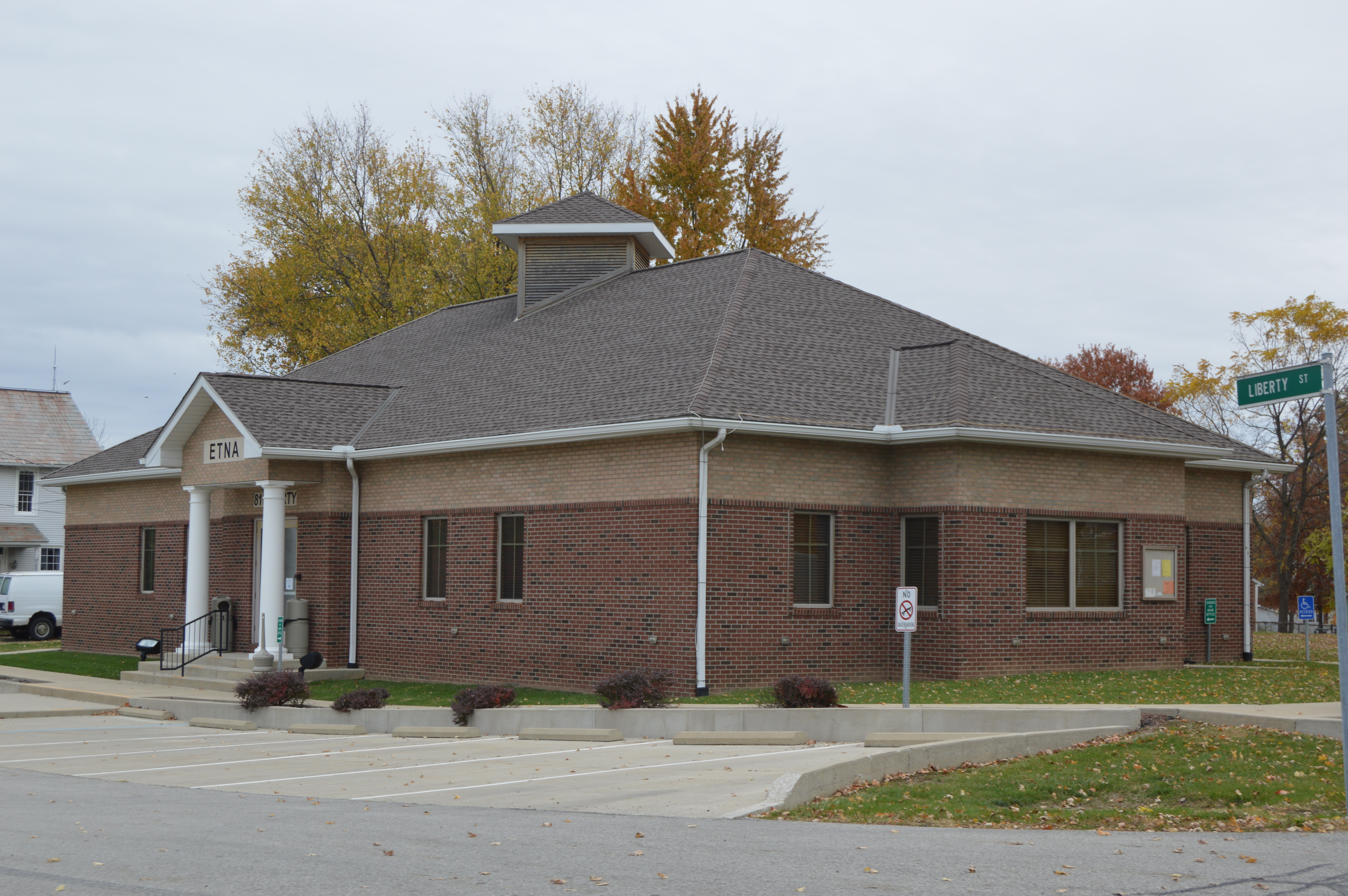
- Township hall at Etna

- Location of Etna Township in Licking County
- Coordinates: 39°57′14″N 82°41′37″W
- Country: United States
- State: Ohio
- County: Licking

Area
  - Total: 23.4 sq mi (60.6 km^{2})
  - Land: 23.3 sq mi (60.3 km^{2})
  - Water: 0.12 sq mi (0.3 km^{2})
- Elevation: 1,070 ft (326 m)

Population (2020)
  - Total: 18,896
  - Density: 812/sq mi (313/km^{2})
- Time zone: UTC-5 (Eastern (EST))
  - Summer (DST): UTC-4 (EDT)
- ZIP code: 43018, 43062
- Area code: 740
- FIPS code: 39-25690
- GNIS feature ID: 1086456
- Website: etnatownship.com

Etna Township is one of the 25 townships of Licking County, Ohio, United States. As of the 2020 census, the population was 18,896.

== Geography ==
Located in the southwestern corner of the county, it borders the following townships and city:

- Pataskala - north
- Harrison Township - northeast
- Liberty Township, Fairfield County - southeast
- Violet Township, Fairfield County - southwest
- Truro Township, Franklin County - west
- Jefferson Township, Franklin County - northwest corner

Part of the city of Reynoldsburg occupies the western end of Etna Township, part of the village of Kirkersville occupies the eastern end, and the census-designated place of Etna lies in the central part of the township.

== Name and history ==
Etna Township was established in 1833. It is the only Etna Township statewide.

Two Native American mounds, known as the "Etna Township Mounds", are located within the township. Etna Township is located entirely within the Refugee Tract.

== Government ==
The township is governed by a three-member board of trustees, who are elected in November of odd-numbered years to a four-year term beginning on the following January 1. Two are elected in the year after the presidential election and one is elected in the year before it. There is also an elected township fiscal officer, who serves a four-year term beginning on April 1 of the year after the election, which is held in November of the year before the presidential election. Vacancies in the fiscal officership or on the board of trustees are filled by the remaining trustees.
