= Etna, Licking County, Ohio =

Etna, Ohio
- Census-designated place
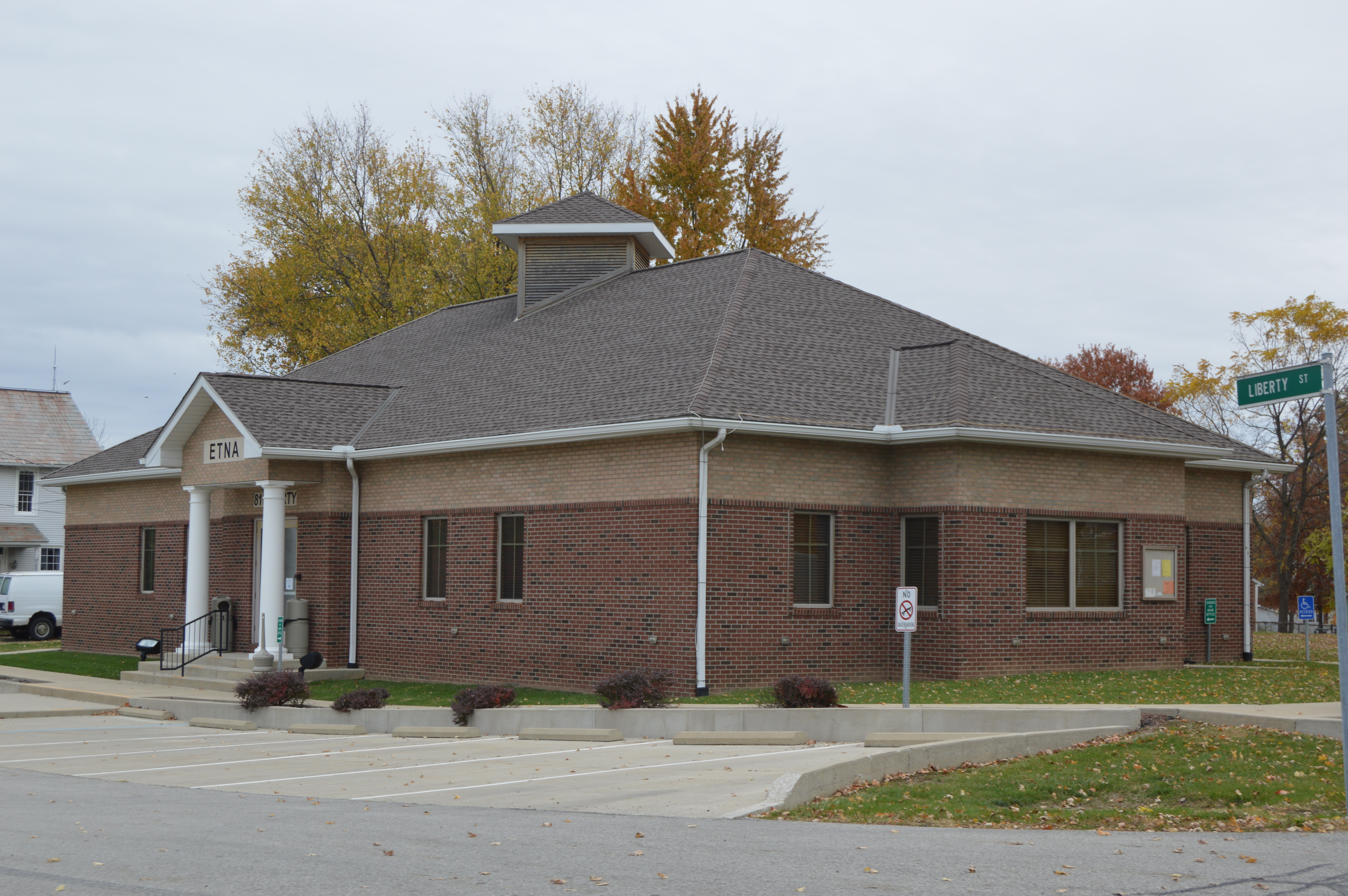
- Township hall at Etna

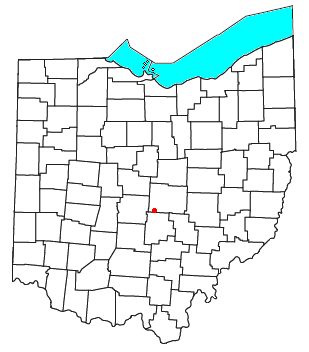
- Location of Etna in Ohio
- Coordinates: 39°57′16″N 82°41′16″W
- Country: United States
- State: Ohio
- County: Licking
- Township: Etna

Area
  - Total: 0.62 sq mi (1.60 km^{2})
  - Land: 0.61 sq mi (1.59 km^{2})
  - Water: 0.0039 sq mi (0.01 km^{2})
- Elevation: 1,070 ft (330 m)

Population (2020)
  - Total: 1,209
  - Density: 1,966.1/sq mi (759.11/km^{2})
- Time zone: UTC-5 (Eastern (EST))
  - Summer (DST): UTC-4 (EDT)
- ZIP Code: 43062 (Pataskala)
- FIPS code: 39-25676
- GNIS feature ID: 2633229

Etna (formerly Carthage) is an unincorporated community and census-designated place (CDP) in Licking County, Ohio, United States. As of the 2020 census it had a population of 1,209. It lies at an elevation of 1,069 feet (326 m) at the intersection of U.S. Route 40 and State Route 310. It was listed as a census-designated place in 2010.

== History ==
Etna was originally called "Carthage", under which name it was laid out in 1832 when the National Road was being built to that point. The present name is derived from Etna Township. A post office called Etna has been in operation since 1833.

== Geography ==
Etna is in southwestern Licking County, in the center of Etna Township. U.S. Route 40 forms the northern edge of the community, and Interstate 70 forms the southern edge. Access from I-70 is via Exit 118 (State Route 310). Both US 40 and I-70 lead west 18 miles (29 km) to Columbus and east 35 miles (56 km) to Zanesville. Newark, the Licking county seat, is 20 miles (32 km) to the northeast.

According to the U.S. Census Bureau, the Etna CDP has a total area of 0.7 square miles (1.7 km^{2}), of which 0.04 square miles (0.1 km^{2}), or 0.65%, are water. Etna's surface area drains northeast to the South Fork of the Licking River, an east-flowing tributary of the Muskingum River and part of the Ohio River watershed.

== Demographics ==
Historical population
Census	Pop.	Note	%±
2020	1,209		—
U.S. Decennial Census
