= St. Albans Township, Licking County, Ohio =

Township in Ohio, US

- Township
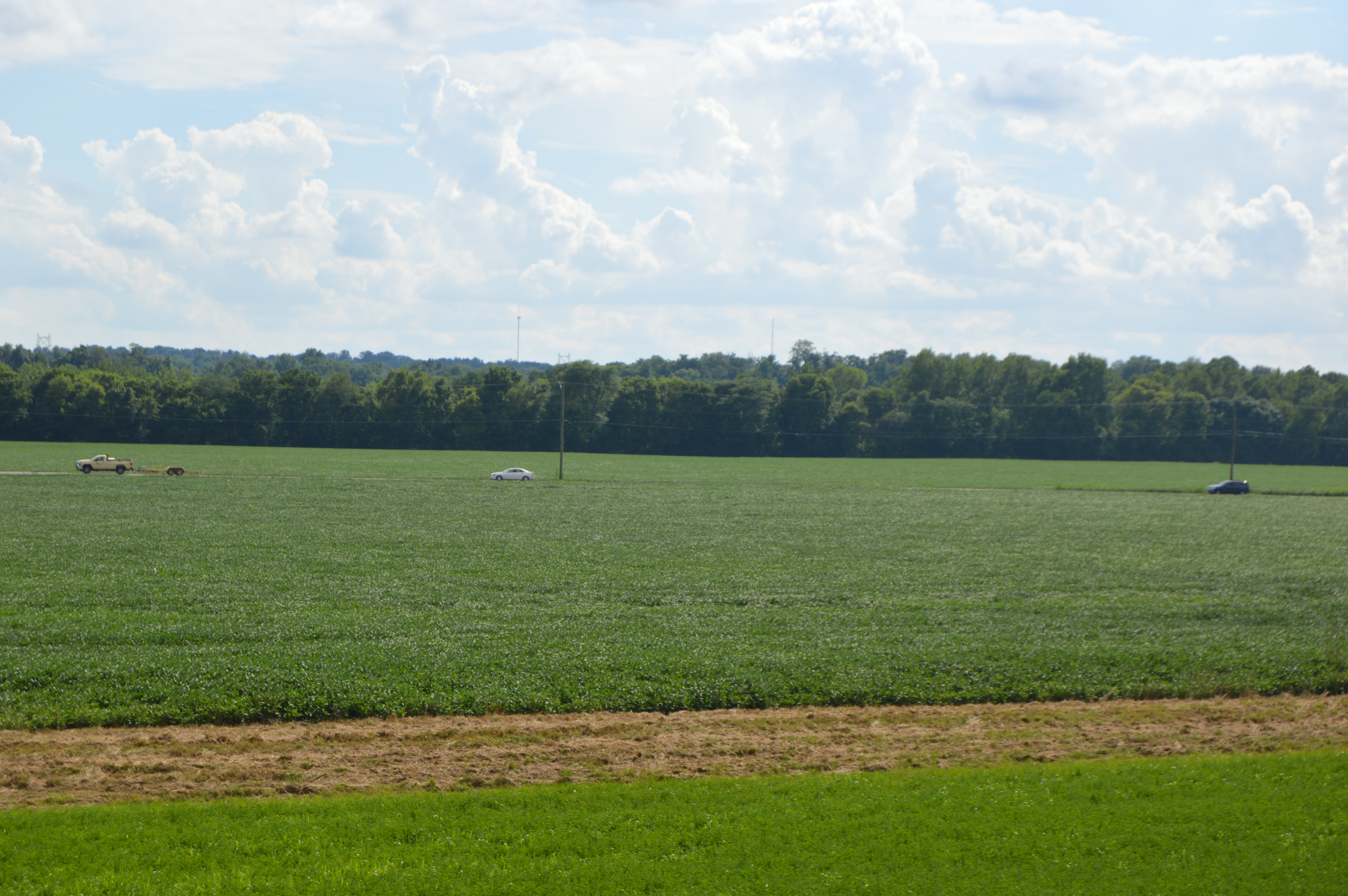
- Along State Route 37 northwest of Alexandria

- Location of St. Albans Township in Licking County
- Coordinates: 40°5′34″N 82°37′26″W
- Country: United States
- State: Ohio
- County: Licking

Area
  - Total: 26.43 sq mi (68.45 km^{2})
  - Land: 26.23 sq mi (67.94 km^{2})
  - Water: 0.20 sq mi (0.51 km^{2})
- Elevation: 1,050 ft (320 m)

Population (2020)
  - Total: 2,542
  - Density: 96.91/sq mi (37.42/km^{2})
- Time zone: UTC-5 (Eastern (EST))
  - Summer (DST): UTC-4 (EDT)
- FIPS code: 39-69456
- GNIS feature ID: 1086478
- Website: www.stalbanstwp.org

St. Albans Township is one of the 25 townships of Licking County, Ohio, United States. As of the 2020 census, the total population was 2,542.

== Geography ==
Located in the western part of the county, it borders the following townships and city:

- Liberty Township - north
- McKean Township - northeast corner
- Granville Township - east
- Union Township - southeast corner
- Harrison Township - south
- Pataskala - southwest corner
- Jersey Township - west
- Monroe Township - northwest corner

The village of Alexandria is located in central St. Albans Township.

== Name and history ==
It is the only St. Albans Township statewide.

== Government ==
The township is governed by a three-member board of trustees, who are elected in November of odd-numbered years to a four-year term beginning on the following January 1. Two are elected in the year after the presidential election and one is elected in the year before it. There is also an elected township fiscal officer, who serves a four-year term beginning on April 1 of the year after the election, which is held in November of the year before the presidential election. Vacancies in the fiscal officership or on the board of trustees are filled by the remaining trustees.
