= National Register of Historic Places listings in Franklin County, Ohio =

Location of Franklin County in Ohio

Map

This is a list of the National Register of Historic Places listings in Franklin County, Ohio.

This is a list of the properties and districts on the National Register of Historic Places in Franklin County, Ohio, United States. Latitude and longitude coordinates are provided for many National Register properties and districts; these locations may be seen together in an online map.

There are 362 properties and districts listed on the National Register in Franklin County, including 3 National Historic Landmarks. The city of Columbus is the location of 185 of these properties and districts, including all of the National Historic Landmarks; they are listed separately, while the remaining 177 properties and districts are listed here.

This National Park Service list is complete through NPS recent listings posted October 30, 2026.

== Current listings ==
=== Exclusive of Columbus ===
	Name on the Register	Image	Date listed	Location	City or town	Description
1	Demas Adams House	Demas Adams House	April 17, 1980 (#80003005)	721 High St. 40°05′19″N 83°01′08″W	Worthington	
2	Agler-La Follette House	Agler-La Follette House	December 14, 1978 (#78002062)	2621 Sunbury Rd. 40°01′29″N 82°56′04″W	Mifflin Township	
3	Alkire House	Alkire House	March 30, 1978 (#78002068)	259 N. State St. 40°07′58″N 82°56′00″W	Westerville	
4	Arendt-Seymour House	Arendt-Seymour House	August 15, 1989 (#89001024)	53 W. Columbus St. 39°50′29″N 82°48′28″W	Canal Winchester	
5	Artz House	Artz House	April 11, 1979 (#79002901)	56 N. High St. 40°06′03″N 83°06′48″W	Dublin	
6	Bank Block Building	Bank Block Building	September 15, 1997 (#97000510)	1255-1293 Grandview Ave. 39°58′58″N 83°02′44″W	Grandview Heights	
7	Barnhardt-Bolenbaugh House	Barnhardt-Bolenbaugh House	August 15, 1989 (#89001027)	113 E. Waterloo St. 39°50′28″N 82°48′07″W	Canal Winchester	
8	Dr. L.W. Beery House	Dr. L.W. Beery House	August 15, 1989 (#89001033)	68 Washington St. 39°50′32″N 82°48′32″W	Canal Winchester	
9	Bergstresser Covered Bridge	Bergstresser Covered Bridge	May 3, 1974 (#74001484)	West of State Route 674 over Walnut Creek; 39°49′48″N 82°49′00″W	Canal Winchester	
10	E. Boles Cottage	E. Boles Cottage	April 11, 1979 (#79002886)	5350 Hayden Run Rd. 40°03′35″N 83°08′49″W	Hilliard	
11	Asher Brand Residence	Asher Brand Residence	April 11, 1979 (#79002740)	5381 Brand Rd. 40°07′06″N 83°07′57″W	Dublin	
12	Brelsford-Seese House	Brelsford-Seese House	April 11, 1979 (#79002888)	129 Riverview St. 40°05′49″N 83°06′44″W	Dublin	
13	Bruns-Wynkoop House	Bruns-Wynkoop House	August 15, 1989 (#89001023)	129 Washington St. 39°50′25″N 82°48′31″W	Canal Winchester	
14	J.G. Butler House	J.G. Butler House	April 11, 1979 (#79002759)	35 S. High St. 40°05′56″N 83°06′50″W	Dublin	
15	Aurora Buttles House	Aurora Buttles House	April 17, 1980 (#80003007)	12 E. Strafford Ave. 40°05′28″N 83°01′03″W	Worthington	
16	Buttles-Johnson House	Buttles-Johnson House	April 3, 1973 (#73001443)	956 High St. 40°05′37″N 83°01′02″W	Worthington	
17	Canal Winchester Methodist Church	Canal Winchester Methodist Church	March 15, 1982 (#82003567)	S. Columbus and High St. 39°50′27″N 82°48′22″W	Canal Winchester	
18	Canal Winchester School	Canal Winchester School	February 9, 2007 (#07000026)	100 South Washington St. 39°50′27″N 82°48′34″W	Canal Winchester	
19	Tom Cannon Mound	Tom Cannon Mound	May 2, 1974 (#74001498)	On a bluff over the confluence of the Big and Little Darby Creeks; 39°53′37″N 83°13′05″W	Pleasant Township	
20	Capital University Historic District	Capital University Historic District	December 17, 1982 (#82001457)	E. Main St. at College Ave. 39°57′21″N 82°56′19″W	Bexley	
21	Carnegie Library Otterbein University	Carnegie Library Otterbein University	February 5, 2021 (#100006110)	102 West College Ave. 40°07′32″N 82°56′07″W	Westerville	
22	J. Carty-R.J. Tussing House	J. Carty-R.J. Tussing House	August 15, 1989 (#89001025)	48 Elm St. 39°50′42″N 82°48′28″W	Canal Winchester	
23	Central College Presbyterian Church	Central College Presbyterian Church	November 24, 1980 (#80004068)	6891 Sunbury Rd. 40°05′59″N 82°53′22″W	Westerville	
24	O.P. Chaney Grain Elevator	O.P. Chaney Grain Elevator	January 28, 1988 (#87002551)	W. Oak and N. High Sts. 39°50′40″N 82°48′23″W	Canal Winchester	
25	Chapman-Hutchinson House	Chapman-Hutchinson House	April 11, 1979 (#79002688)	37 S. Riverview St. 40°05′56″N 83°06′45″W	Dublin	
26	Fletcher Coffman House	Fletcher Coffman House	April 11, 1979 (#79002751)	6659 Coffman Rd. 40°06′15″N 83°08′02″W	Dublin	
27	Columbus Street Historic District	Columbus Street Historic District	May 5, 1988 (#88000559)	8-129 E. Columbus St. and 57 S. High St. 39°50′26″N 82°48′13″W	Canal Winchester	
28	Columbus, Hocking Valley and Toledo Railway Depot	Columbus, Hocking Valley and Toledo Railway Depot	January 28, 1988 (#87002550)	100 N. High St. 39°50′44″N 82°48′21″W	Canal Winchester	
29	Walter Datz House	Walter Datz House	April 11, 1979 (#79002889)	5040 Tuttle Rd. 40°04′40″N 83°07′41″W	Dublin	
30	David's Reformed Church	David's Reformed Church	August 15, 1989 (#89001017)	80 W. Columbus St. 39°50′30″N 82°48′31″W	Canal Winchester	
31	Alexander Davis Cabin	Alexander Davis Cabin	April 11, 1979 (#79002892)	5436 Dublin Rd. (rear house); 40°04′41″N 83°06′46″W	Dublin	
32	Alexander Davis House	Alexander Davis House	April 11, 1979 (#79002746)	5436 Dublin Rd. (front house); 40°04′41″N 83°06′48″W	Dublin	
33	James Davis Barn	James Davis Barn	April 11, 1979 (#79002789)	5707 Dublin Rd. 40°04′58″N 83°06′55″W	Dublin	
34	James Davis Farm	James Davis Farm	April 11, 1979 (#79002772)	5707 Dublin Rd. 40°05′00″N 83°06′55″W	Dublin	
35	Samuel Henry Davis House	Samuel Henry Davis House	April 11, 1979 (#79002692)	5083 Rings Rd. 40°05′02″N 83°07′41″W	Dublin	
36	Samuel Davis House	Samuel Davis House	February 15, 1974 (#74001488)	4264 Dublin Rd. 40°02′44″N 83°06′13″W	Norwich Township	
37	Elias Decker Farmhouse	Elias Decker Farmhouse	August 15, 1989 (#89001034)	6170 Lithopolis Rd. 39°49′36″N 82°50′16″W	Canal Winchester	
38	Samuel Deitz Farmhouse	Samuel Deitz Farmhouse	August 15, 1989 (#89001021)	280 Ashbrook Rd. 39°49′59″N 82°48′56″W	Canal Winchester	
39	Drexel Theater	Drexel Theater	June 8, 2015 (#15000322)	2254 E. Main St. 39°57′26″N 82°56′19″W	Bexley	
40	Dublin Cemetery Vaults	Dublin Cemetery Vaults	April 11, 1979 (#79002790)	State Route 161, 0.25 miles (0.40 km) west of its intersection with Dublin River Rd. 40°05′51″N 83°07′01″W	Dublin	
41	Dublin Christian Church	Dublin Christian Church	April 11, 1979 (#79002742)	81 W. Bridge St. (State Route 161); 40°05′56″N 83°06′58″W	Dublin	
42	Dublin Christian Church	Dublin Christian Church	April 11, 1979 (#79002896)	53 N. High St. 40°06′00″N 83°06′50″W	Dublin	
43	Dublin High Street Historic District	Dublin High Street Historic District	April 11, 1979 (#79003645)	6-126 High St. (both sides of street); 40°05′58″N 83°06′49″W	Dublin	
44	Dublin Veterinary Clinic	Dublin Veterinary Clinic	April 11, 1979 (#79002884)	32 W. Bridge St. 40°05′59″N 83°06′53″W	Dublin	
45	John Dun Homestead	John Dun Homestead	April 11, 1979 (#79002691)	8055 Dublin-Bellpoint Rd. (at intersection of Ashford Rd.); 40°07′56″N 83°07′28″W	Dublin	
46	Robert P. Duncan House	Robert P. Duncan House	August 23, 1984 (#09000094)	333 N. Parkview Ave. 39°58′34″N 82°56′31″W	Bexley	
47	George and Christina Ealy House	George and Christina Ealy House	July 2, 2008 (#08000626)	6359 Dublin-Granville Rd. 40°04′57″N 82°49′10″W	New Albany	
48	Henry J. Epley House	Henry J. Epley House	August 15, 1989 (#89001020)	55 Franklin St. 39°50′26″N 82°48′29″W	Canal Winchester	
49	Richard W. Evans House	Richard W. Evans House	April 17, 1980 (#80003020)	92 E. Granville Rd. 40°05′20″N 83°00′55″W	Worthington	
50	John W. Everal Farm Buildings	John W. Everal Farm Buildings	September 18, 1975 (#75001404)	7610 Cleveland Ave. 40°07′35″N 82°56′52″W	Westerville	
51	Foor-Alspach House	Foor-Alspach House	August 15, 1989 (#89001035)	92 E. Waterloo St. 39°50′30″N 82°48′10″W	Canal Winchester	
52	Frantz House	Frantz House	April 11, 1979 (#79002741)	6152 Frantz Rd. 40°05′31″N 83°07′27″W	Dublin	
53	John Galbreath Mound	John Galbreath Mound	July 15, 1974 (#74001497)	Eastern bank of Big Darby Creek, west of Galloway; 39°54′43″N 83°13′16″W	Pleasant Township	
54	Gantz Homestead	Gantz Homestead	June 20, 1979 (#79001842)	2233 Gantz Rd. 39°53′52″N 83°03′46″W	Grove City	
55	Gardner House	Gardner House	April 17, 1980 (#80003009)	80 W. Granville Rd. 40°05′28″N 83°01′13″W	Worthington	
56	Christian Gayman House	Christian Gayman House	August 15, 1989 (#89001037)	110 E. Waterloo St. 39°50′30″N 82°48′08″W	Canal Winchester	
57	Eleanor A. Gelpi House	Eleanor A. Gelpi House	March 19, 2001 (#01000198)	7125 Riverside Dr. 40°06′45″N 83°06′39″W	Dublin	
58	Gilbert House	Gilbert House	April 17, 1980 (#80003016)	72 E. Granville Rd. 40°05′19″N 83°00′56″W	Worthington	
59	Gilbert-Wilcox House	Gilbert-Wilcox House	April 17, 1980 (#80003021)	196 E. Granville Rd. 40°05′19″N 83°00′41″W	Worthington	
60	A.G. Grant Homestead	A.G. Grant Homestead	June 3, 1998 (#98000667)	4124 Haughn Rd. 39°52′48″N 83°05′07″W	Grove City	
61	Green Lawn Abbey	Green Lawn Abbey	June 27, 2007 (#07000632)	700 Greenlawn Ave. 39°56′26″N 83°00′58″W	Franklin Township	
62	Martin and Louise Grieve House	Martin and Louise Grieve House	October 11, 2024 (#100010897)	5858 Dublin Road; 40°05′11″N 83°06′53″W	Dublin	
63	James Griffith House	James Griffith House	August 15, 1989 (#89001019)	172 Washington St. 39°50′21″N 82°48′34″W	Canal Winchester	
64	Groveport Log House	Groveport Log House	May 6, 1976 (#76001428)	Wirt Rd. 39°50′58″N 82°53′07″W	Groveport	
65	Groveport School	Groveport School	July 24, 2009 (#09000564)	715 E. Main St. 39°51′01″N 82°52′51″W	Groveport	
66	Groveport Town Hall Historic Group	Groveport Town Hall Historic Group	July 31, 1978 (#78002067)	628, 632 Main and Main and Front Sts. 39°51′05″N 82°52′57″W	Groveport	
67	Groveport United Methodist Church	Groveport United Methodist Church	April 20, 1995 (#95000494)	512 Main St. 39°51′08″N 82°53′10″W	Groveport	
68	Parley Haffey Farm Complex	Parley Haffey Farm Complex	August 15, 1989 (#89001022)	525 Gender Rd. 39°49′55″N 82°49′52″W	Canal Winchester	
69	J.L. Hamilton Residence	J.L. Hamilton Residence	April 11, 1979 (#79002887)	6273 Cosgray Rd. 40°05′54″N 83°11′20″W	Washington Township	
70	Benjamin Hanby House	Benjamin Hanby House	November 10, 1970 (#70000493)	160 W. Main St. 40°07′34″N 82°56′15″W	Westerville	
71	Gideon Hart House	Gideon Hart House	August 14, 1973 (#73001442)	7328 Hempstead Rd. 40°06′32″N 82°53′52″W	Westerville	
72	Lucy Hart House	Lucy Hart House	April 17, 1980 (#80003008)	64 W. Granville Rd. 40°05′29″N 83°01′11″W	Worthington	
73	Helpman-Chaney House	Helpman-Chaney House	August 15, 1989 (#89001032)	132 W. Columbus St. 39°50′30″N 82°48′38″W	Canal Winchester	
74	Christian S. Herr House	Christian S. Herr House	March 5, 1982 (#82003571)	North of Lockbourne at 1451 Rathmell Rd. 39°51′38″N 82°58′08″W	Hamilton Township	
75	Hilliard Methodist Episcopal Church	Hilliard Methodist Episcopal Church	August 4, 1988 (#88000634)	4066 Main St. 40°02′05″N 83°09′30″W	Hilliard	
76	Holder-Wright Works	Holder-Wright Works	February 15, 1974 (#74001496)	Off Bright Rd., east of the Scioto River; 40°06′47″N 83°06′23″W	Dublin	
77	Home for the Aged Deaf	Home for the Aged Deaf	November 25, 1980 (#80004522)	6971 Sunbury Rd. 40°06′05″N 82°53′21″W	Westerville	
78	Hotel Central	Hotel Central	April 17, 1980 (#80003012)	649 High St. 40°05′13″N 83°01′06″W	Worthington	
79	Franz Huntington House	Franz Huntington House	May 29, 1980 (#80002999)	81 N. Drexel Ave. 39°58′17″N 82°56′16″W	Bexley	
80	Indian Run Cemetery Stone Walls	Indian Run Cemetery Stone Walls	April 11, 1979 (#79002863)	North High St. 40°06′07″N 83°06′55″W	Dublin	
81	Jackson Fort	Jackson Fort	December 16, 1974 (#74001493)	Surrounding a house at 3845 Westerville Rd. 40°02′55″N 82°56′44″W	Blendon Township	
82	H.P. Jeffers Mound	H.P. Jeffers Mound	May 2, 1974 (#74001499)	Above the junction of Olentangy River Rd. and Plesenton Dr., west of downtown Worthington; 40°05′33″N 83°02′22″W	Worthington	
83	Malcolm Jeffrey House	Malcolm Jeffrey House	May 6, 1983 (#83001970)	358 N. Parkview; 39°58′35″N 82°56′25″W	Bexley	
84	Karrer Barn	Karrer Barn	April 11, 1979 (#79002788)	6199 Dublin Rd. 40°05′42″N 83°06′49″W	Dublin	It has a hay hood.
85	Henry Karrer House	Henry Karrer House	April 11, 1979 (#79002744)	19 S. Riverview; 40°05′58″N 83°06′44″W	Dublin	
86	Kilbourn Commercial Building	Kilbourn Commercial Building	April 17, 1980 (#80003010)	679-681 High St. 40°05′16″N 83°01′06″W	Worthington	
87	William Kilbourn House	William Kilbourn House	April 11, 1979 (#79002894)	63 S. Riverview St. 40°05′54″N 83°06′44″W	Dublin	
88	Frederick G. Kilgour House	Frederick G. Kilgour House	July 3, 2012 (#12000392)	1415 Kirkley Rd. 40°01′11″N 83°03′00″W	Upper Arlington	
89	William King House	William King House	August 15, 1989 (#89001031)	80 E. Waterloo St. 39°50′31″N 82°48′11″W	Canal Winchester	
90	Lanman-Ingram House	Lanman-Ingram House	February 8, 2021 (#100006113)	2015 West Fifth Ave. 39°59′22″N 83°03′40″W	Marble Cliff	
91	Abraham Lehman Farmhouse	Abraham Lehman Farmhouse	August 15, 1989 (#89001016)	40 Lehman Dr. 39°50′58″N 82°48′47″W	Canal Winchester	
92	C. Leppert Barn	C. Leppert Barn	April 11, 1979 (#79002784)	5280 Pinney Rd. 40°05′28″N 83°07′44″W	Dublin	
93	C. Leppert Cabin	C. Leppert Cabin	April 11, 1979 (#79002785)	5280 Pinney Rd. 40°05′27″N 83°07′42″W	Dublin	
94	C. Leppert Farm	C. Leppert Farm	April 11, 1979 (#79002783)	5280 Pinney Rd. 40°05′27″N 83°07′42″W	Dublin	
95	Alexander W. Livingston House	Alexander W. Livingston House	June 17, 1994 (#94000593)	1792 Graham Rd. 39°56′52″N 82°47′44″W	Reynoldsburg	
96	Doctor Longenecker Office Building	Doctor Longenecker Office Building	March 9, 1990 (#90000379)	633-5 High St. 40°05′11″N 83°01′06″W	Worthington	
97	David Marshall House	David Marshall House	April 11, 1979 (#79002686)	7455 Cosgray Rd. 40°06′26″N 83°11′30″W	Washington Township	
98	Mattoon-Woodrow House	Mattoon-Woodrow House	April 17, 1980 (#80003011)	72 E. North St. 40°05′34″N 83°00′56″W	Worthington	
99	McCracken-Sells House	McCracken-Sells House	November 29, 1984 (#84000440)	3983 Dublin Rd. 40°02′08″N 83°06′12″W	Mifflin Township	
100	Austin McDowell House	Austin McDowell House	April 11, 1979 (#79002906)	6189 Dublin Rd. 40°05′37″N 83°06′47″W	Dublin	
101	Dr. McKitrick House	Dr. McKitrick House	April 11, 1979 (#79002687)	16 N. High St. 40°05′59″N 83°06′50″W	Dublin	
102	Dr. McKitrick Office	Dr. McKitrick Office	April 11, 1979 (#79002882)	22 N. High St. 40°06′00″N 83°06′48″W	Dublin	
103	Dr. James Merryman House	Dr. James Merryman House	May 26, 1988 (#88000638)	5232 Norwich St. 40°02′00″N 83°09′24″W	Hilliard	
104	Methodist Church Parsonage	Methodist Church Parsonage	August 15, 1989 (#89001030)	59 W. Columbus St. 39°50′29″N 82°48′29″W	Canal Winchester	
105	J.F. Miller House	J.F. Miller House	May 31, 1984 (#84003682)	1600 Roxbury Rd. 39°59′18″N 83°03′41″W	Marble Cliff	
106	Charles Mitchell House	Charles Mitchell House	April 11, 1979 (#79002890)	6992 Dublin-Bellpoint Rd. 40°06′36″N 83°06′52″W	Washington Township	
107	Myer House	Myer House	April 11, 1979 (#79002689)	5927 Rings Rd. 40°04′51″N 83°09′03″W	Dublin	
108	Nafzger-Miller House	Nafzger-Miller House	January 21, 1999 (#98001641)	110 Mill St. 40°01′13″N 82°52′46″W	Gahanna	
109	New England Lodge	New England Lodge	March 20, 1973 (#73001444)	634 N. High St. 40°05′10″N 83°01′04″W	Worthington	
110	Niles Car & Manufacturing Company Electric Railway Interurban Combine No. 21	Niles Car & Manufacturing Company Electric Railway Interurban Combine No. 21	June 19, 1987 (#87000762)	990 Proprietor's Rd. 40°05′24″N 83°00′07″W	Worthington	
111	Lewis Noble House	Lewis Noble House	April 17, 1980 (#80003006)	48 W. South St. 40°05′04″N 83°01′09″W	Worthington	
112	North High Street Historic District	North High Street Historic District	August 15, 1989 (#89001038)	Roughly N. High St. and E. and W. Mound St. 39°50′39″N 82°48′19″W	Canal Winchester	
113	Odd Fellows Hall	Odd Fellows Hall	May 26, 1988 (#88000636)	4065 Main St. 40°02′05″N 83°09′32″W	Hilliard	
114	Ohio and Erie Canal Southern Descent Historic District	Ohio and Erie Canal Southern Descent Historic District	April 1, 2019 (#100003572)	Multiple; 39°49′09″N 82°57′40″W	Lockbourne	Boundary increase approved September 2, 2022; extends into other Ohio counties
115	Old Peace Lutheran Church	Old Peace Lutheran Church	April 23, 1987 (#87000640)	78-82 N. High St. 40°01′11″N 82°52′42″W	Gahanna	
116	Charles S. Osborn House	Charles S. Osborn House	March 28, 1977 (#77001061)	5785 Cooper Rd., south of Westerville; 40°05′17″N 82°55′55″W	Blendon Township	
117	Otterbein Mausoleum	Otterbein Mausoleum	November 29, 1979 (#79001845)	W. Walnut St. 40°07′13″N 82°56′10″W	Westerville	
118	Jonathan Park House	Jonathan Park House	April 17, 1980 (#80003013)	91 E. Granville Rd. 40°05′18″N 83°00′55″W	Worthington	
119	Peoples Bank Company Building	Peoples Bank Company Building	August 15, 1989 (#89001026)	10 N. High St. 39°50′35″N 82°48′22″W	Canal Winchester	
120	Pinney Road Log Cabin	Pinney Road Log Cabin	April 11, 1979 (#79002786)	Pinney Rd. 40°05′51″N 83°07′28″W	Dublin	
121	Dr. Eli Pinney House	Dr. Eli Pinney House	April 11, 1979 (#79002761)	109 S. Riverview St. 40°05′50″N 83°06′44″W	Dublin	
122	Presbyterian Parsonage	Presbyterian Parsonage	November 25, 1980 (#80004246)	6972 Sunbury Rd. 40°06′04″N 82°53′18″W	Westerville	
123	Principal's Cottage	Principal's Cottage	April 17, 1980 (#80003014)	38 Short St. 40°05′09″N 83°01′09″W	Worthington	
124	John Rager Farmhouse	John Rager Farmhouse	October 1, 1990 (#90001498)	8020 Groveport Rd., west of Canal Winchester; 39°50′54″N 82°51′07″W	Madison Township	
125	F. Riley House	F. Riley House	April 11, 1979 (#79002738)	182 S. High St. 40°05′45″N 83°06′46″W	Dublin	
126	Louis Rings Barn No. 1	Louis Rings Barn No. 1	April 11, 1979 (#79002769)	6665 Shiers-Rings Rd. 40°05′37″N 83°10′15″W	Dublin	
127	Louis Rings Barn No. 2	Louis Rings Barn No. 2	April 11, 1979 (#79002767)	6665 Shiers-Rings Rd. 40°05′37″N 83°10′15″W	Dublin	
128	Louis Rings Residence	Louis Rings Residence	April 11, 1979 (#79002765)	6665 Shiers-Rings Rd. 40°05′38″N 83°10′12″W	Dublin	
129	Ripley House	Ripley House	April 17, 1980 (#80003015)	623 High St. 40°05′09″N 83°01′06″W	Worthington	
130	Rush Creek Village Historic District	Rush Creek Village Historic District	August 14, 2003 (#03000760)	Residential subdivision centered along E. South St., east of Morning St. 40°05′10″N 83°00′33″W	Worthington	
131	Mark Russell House	Mark Russell House	December 12, 1976 (#76001429)	5751 N. High St. 40°04′48″N 83°01′09″W	Riverlea	
132	Benjamin Sells Barn No. 1	Benjamin Sells Barn No. 1	April 11, 1979 (#79003133)	4586 Hayden Run Rd. 40°04′05″N 83°06′58″W	Washington Township	
133	Benjamin Sells Barn No. 2	Benjamin Sells Barn No. 2	April 11, 1979 (#79003134)	4586 Hayden Run Rd. 40°04′05″N 83°07′00″W	Washington Township	
134	Benjamin Sells House	Benjamin Sells House	July 30, 1975 (#75001403)	4586 Hayden Run Rd. 40°04′06″N 83°06′57″W	Washington Township	
135	Benjamin Sells Wash House	Benjamin Sells Wash House	April 11, 1979 (#79002893)	4586 Hayden Run Rd. 40°04′05″N 83°06′57″W	Washington Township	
136	David Sells Barn	David Sells Barn	April 11, 1979 (#79003135)	4586 Hayden Run Rd. 40°04′04″N 83°07′00″W	Washington Township	
137	Eliud Sells House	Eliud Sells House	April 11, 1979 (#79002891)	83 S. Riverview St. 40°05′53″N 83°06′03″W	Dublin	
138	William Henry Sells House	William Henry Sells House	April 11, 1979 (#79002895)	6028 Dublin Rd. 40°05′04″N 83°06′51″W	Dublin	
139	Sessions Village	Sessions Village	February 20, 1975 (#75001401)	Both sides of Sessions Dr. 39°58′10″N 82°56′40″W	Bexley	
140	Sharon Township Town Hall	Sharon Township Town Hall	April 17, 1980 (#80003017)	Granville Rd. and Hartford St. 40°05′19″N 83°00′58″W	Worthington	
141	Shepard Street School	Shepard Street School	November 29, 1979 (#79001841)	106 Short St. 40°01′13″N 82°52′37″W	Gahanna	
142	Carl H. Shier Barn	Carl H. Shier Barn	April 11, 1979 (#79002873)	7026 Shier-Rings Rd. 40°05′38″N 83°11′00″W	Washington Township	
143	Carl H. Shier Chicken House	Carl H. Shier Chicken House	April 11, 1979 (#79002868)	7026 Shier-Rings Rd. 40°05′38″N 83°11′00″W	Washington Township	
144	Carl H. Shier House	Carl H. Shier House	April 11, 1979 (#79002865)	7026 Shier-Rings Rd. 40°05′38″N 83°11′00″W	Washington Township	
145	Capt. J.S. Skeele House	Capt. J.S. Skeele House	April 17, 1980 (#80003018)	700 Hartford St. 40°05′18″N 83°00′57″W	Worthington	
146	John Snow House	John Snow House	July 26, 1973 (#73001445)	41 W. New England Ave. 40°05′12″N 83°01′09″W	Worthington	
147	Squire's Glen Farm	Squire's Glen Farm	August 13, 1974 (#74001485)	6770 Sunbury Rd. 40°05′50″N 82°53′10″W	Westerville	
148	St. John's Episcopal Church	St. John's Episcopal Church	April 17, 1980 (#80003019)	700 High St. 40°05′19″N 83°01′02″W	Worthington	
149	St. John's Lutheran Church	St. John's Lutheran Church	April 11, 1979 (#79002877)	6135 Rings Rd. 40°04′48″N 83°09′24″W	Dublin	
150	Joshua Stevenson House	Joshua Stevenson House	June 21, 2007 (#07000581)	5105 Bowen Rd., north of Canal Winchester; 39°52′44″N 82°48′16″W	Madison Township	
151	Temperance Row Historic District	Temperance Row Historic District	October 16, 2008 (#08000995)	Park, Grove, Walnut, and University Sts. 40°07′24″N 82°56′11″W	Westerville	
152	Thompson-Builder House	Thompson-Builder House	April 11, 1979 (#79002749)	5051 Brand Rd. 40°07′00″N 83°07′39″W	Dublin	
153	Morgan Thrush Farm Complex	Morgan Thrush Farm Complex	August 15, 1989 (#89001036)	375 Gender Rd. 39°50′24″N 82°49′46″W	Canal Winchester	
154	Times Building-Lodge Hall	Times Building-Lodge Hall	August 15, 1989 (#89001028)	19 E. Waterloo St. 39°50′32″N 82°48′18″W	Canal Winchester	
155	Towers Hall, Otterbein College	Towers Hall, Otterbein College	March 4, 1971 (#71000638)	Main and Grove Sts. on the Otterbein College campus 40°07′31″N 82°56′11″W	Westerville	
156	Upper Arlington Historic District	Upper Arlington Historic District	September 30, 1985 (#85002694)	Roughly bounded by Lane Ave., Andover Rd., 5th Ave., Cambridge Boulevard, and Riverside Dr. 39°59′59″N 83°03′54″W	Upper Arlington	
157	Uptown Westerville Historic District	Uptown Westerville Historic District	June 17, 2019 (#100004055)	State St. between Home St. and Dill and Starrock Alleys; 40°07′36″N 82°55′54″W	Westerville	
158	Rev. Ebenezer Washburn House	Rev. Ebenezer Washburn House	November 25, 1980 (#80003004)	7121 Sunbury Rd. 40°06′15″N 82°53′18″W	Westerville	
159	Washington Township School	Washington Township School	April 11, 1979 (#79002762)	4915 Brand Rd. 40°07′02″N 83°07′33″W	Dublin	
160	Washington Township Voting Hall	Washington Township Voting Hall	April 11, 1979 (#79002880)	Rings Rd., fourth building east of the railroad tracks 40°04′37″N 83°10′47″W	Washington Township	
161	Wesley Chapel	Wesley Chapel	February 27, 1979 (#79001843)	Southeast of Hilliard at 3299 Dublin Rd. 40°01′02″N 83°06′00″W	Norwich Township	
162	West Mound Street Historic District	West Mound Street Historic District	February 11, 1988 (#88000072)	10-54 West Mound St., 23 Elm St. 39°50′39″N 82°48′25″W	Canal Winchester	
163	Westerville High School-Vine Street School	Westerville High School-Vine Street School	May 29, 1975 (#75001405)	44 N. Vine St. 40°07′38″N 82°55′43″W	Westerville	
164	Frieda Whitmer House	Frieda Whitmer House	April 11, 1979 (#79002690)	5530 Houchard Rd. 40°04′42″N 83°11′51″W	Washington Township	
165	Jacob Wilcox Farm	Jacob Wilcox Farm	April 11, 1979 (#79002899)	7495 Rings Rd. 40°04′29″N 83°11′42″W	Washington Township	No longer extant per Google Street View.
166	James Wilcox House	James Wilcox House	April 11, 1979 (#79002898)	7590 Rings Rd. 40°04′31″N 83°11′52″W	Washington Township	
167	Winterringer Building and House	Winterringer Building and House	June 9, 1988 (#88000720)	5344 Center St. 40°02′04″N 83°09′35″W	Hilliard	
168	Worthington Historic District	Worthington Historic District	April 13, 2010 (#10000190)	Roughly bounded by North, South, Morning, and Evening Sts. 40°05′20″N 83°01′05″W	Worthington	
169	Worthington Historical Society Museum	Worthington Historical Society Museum	April 17, 1980 (#80003022)	50 W. New England Ave. 40°05′13″N 83°01′12″W	Worthington	
170	Worthington Manufacturing Company Boardinghouse	Worthington Manufacturing Company Boardinghouse	June 19, 1973 (#73001446)	25 Fox Lane; 40°05′05″N 83°01′46″W	Worthington	
171	Worthington Public Square	Worthington Public Square	April 17, 1980 (#80003024)	Village Green; 40°05′19″N 83°01′05″W	Worthington	
172	Worthington United Presbyterian Church	Worthington United Presbyterian Church	April 17, 1980 (#80003023)	High St. and W. Granville Rd. 40°05′22″N 83°01′08″W	Worthington	
173	Horace Wright House	Horace Wright House	April 17, 1980 (#80003025)	137 E. Granville Rd. 40°05′17″N 83°00′49″W	Worthington	
174	George Karrer Farm	George Karrer Farm	April 11, 1979 (#79002905)	167 S. High St. 40°05′40″N 83°06′48″W	Dublin	
175	Potter Wright House	Potter Wright House	April 17, 1980 (#80003026)	174 E. New England Ave. 40°05′12″N 83°00′45″W	Worthington	
176	Zellers-Langel House	Zellers-Langel House	August 15, 1989 (#89001029)	163 W. Waterloo St. 39°50′43″N 82°48′38″W	Canal Winchester	
177	Zion's Evangelical Lutheran Church	Zion's Evangelical Lutheran Church	June 16, 2004 (#04000609)	4501 Groveport Rd. 39°52′34″N 82°56′52″W	Obetz	

== See also ==
- List of National Historic Landmarks in Ohio
- Listings in neighboring counties: Delaware, Fairfield, Licking, Madison, Pickaway, Union
- National Register of Historic Places listings in Ohio
