= Snow House =

Snow house or Snow House may refer to:

- Igloo, a shelter built of snow blocks, originally built by the Inuit
- Quinzhee, a shelter made by hollowing out a pile of settled snow

== Places ==
=== United States ===
- Dudley Snow House, Oxford, Alabama, listed on the NRHP in Calhoun County, Alabama
- Holt–Peeler–Snow House, Macon, Georgia, listed on the National Register of Historic Places in Bibb County, Georgia
- Munroe–Dunlap–Snow House, Macon, Georgia, listed on the National Register of Historic Places in Bibb County, Georgia
- Snow House (Lawrence, Kansas), listed on the National Register of Historic Places in Douglas County, Kansas
- Lemuel Snow Jr. House, Somerville, Massachusetts, listed on the NRHP in Middlesex County, Massachusetts
- Russ and Holland Snow Houses, Brecksville, Ohio, listed on the NRHP in Cuyahoga County, Ohio
- John Snow House, Worthington, Ohio, listed on the NRHP in Franklin County, Ohio
