= Times Building =

Times Building may refer to:

- Los Angeles Times Building, one of five buildings housing the Los Angeles Times but usually building at 1st and Spring Streets in Los Angeles, California that housed The Los Angeles Times (1935–2018)
- One Times Square, the building at One Times Square in New York City that housed The New York Times from 1904 to 1913
- The New York Times Building, the building at 620 Eighth Avenue in New York City that currently houses The New York Times
- The New York Times Building (former), the building at 229 West 43rd Street in New York City that housed The New York Times from 1913 to 2007
- Times Building-Lodge Hall, in Canal Winchester, Ohio, which housed The Winchester Times
- Times Square Building, Seattle, Washington, formerly known as Times Building and listed on the NRHP as that
- The Old Times Building, the building at 228 East Holmes Avenue in Huntsville, Alabama, that's listed on the NRHP
