= Odd Fellows Hall (Hilliard, Ohio) =

- U.S. National Register of Historic Places
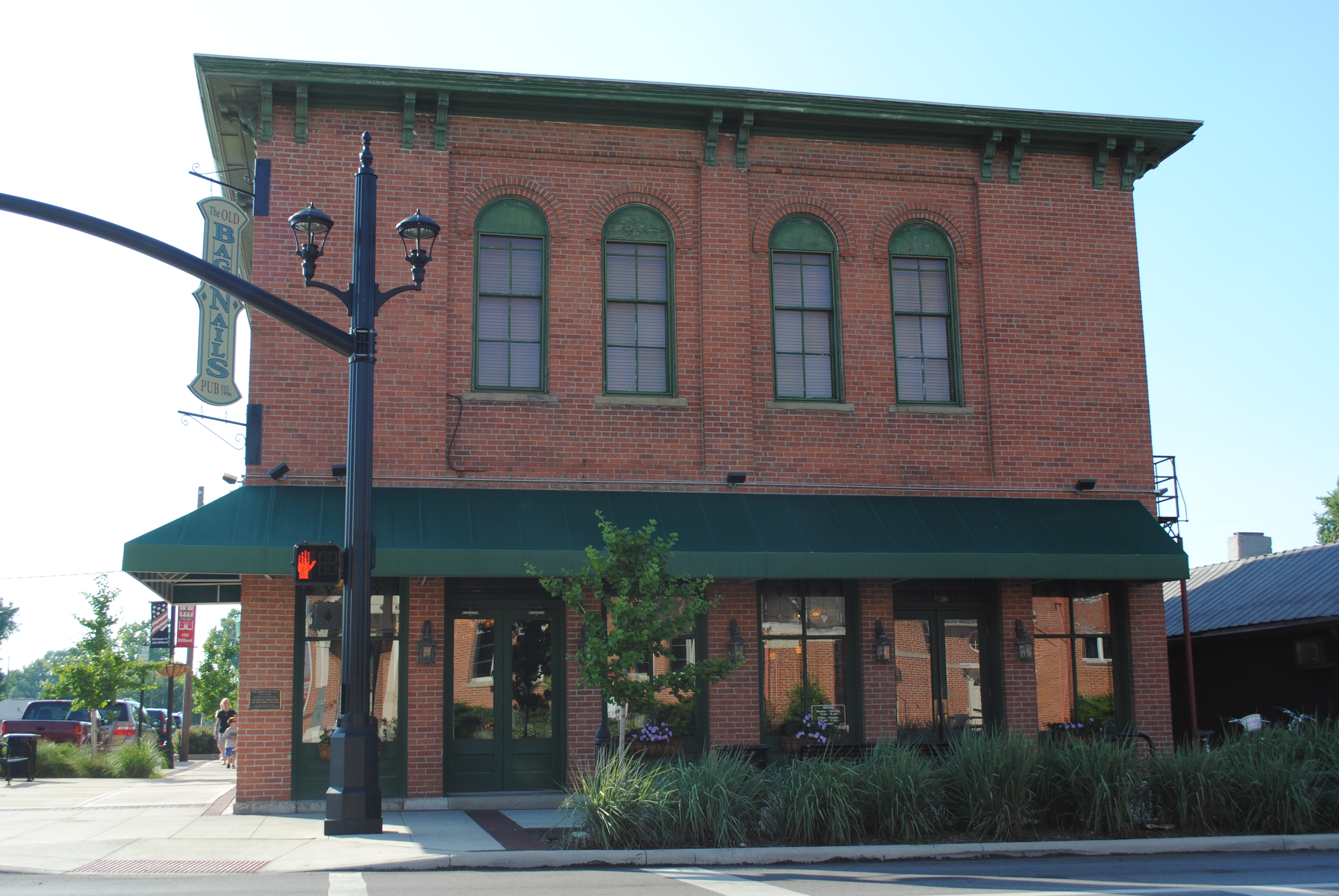
- Front of the building

- Location within Ohio Location within the United States
- Location: 4065 Main St., Hilliard, Ohio
- Coordinates: 40°2′5″N 83°9′32″W
- Area: Less than 1 acre (0.40 ha)
- Built: 1883
- Architectural style: Italianate
- NRHP reference No.: 88000636
- Added to NRHP: May 26, 1988

The Odd Fellows Hall is one of the oldest non-residential buildings in the city of Hilliard, Ohio, United States. Located in the center of the city, it was constructed long before Hilliard's rapid growth of the twentieth-century. It has been named a historic site.

Hilliard's Odd Fellows built the present hall in 1883. At the time, Hilliard was just a small farming community, radically different from its present condition as a city within the Columbus metropolitan area. Typical of small commercial structures erected at the time, the hall is a simple Italianate building. It is one of just two nineteenth-century brick commercial buildings in the city that survive in anything close to their original condition.

Built of brick on a foundation of limestone, the hall is covered with a metal roof, and it features exterior elements of brick and wood. Two stories tall, it features a cornice with paired brackets at the base of the roof. The design takes advantage of the building's location at a street corner: although the first-story windows and entrances are concentrated on one side, both street sides are divided into four bays with four tall arched windows on the second story. Inside, the first story is divided into a pair of shop spaces, while the Odd Fellows' second-story meeting room has experienced minimal modification. Still remaining are the original hoodmolds over the doors and windows, wainscoting, wooden floor, lights, and ornamental metalwork covering the ceiling.

On May 6, 1988, the Odd Fellows Hall was listed on the National Register of Historic Places, qualifying because of its historically significant architecture. On the same day, the National Park Service gave the same designation to three other Hilliard buildings, the Hilliard United Methodist Church, the Dr. James Merryman House, and the Winterringer Building and House.
