= Presbyterian Parsonage (Westerville, Ohio) =

- U.S. National Register of Historic Places
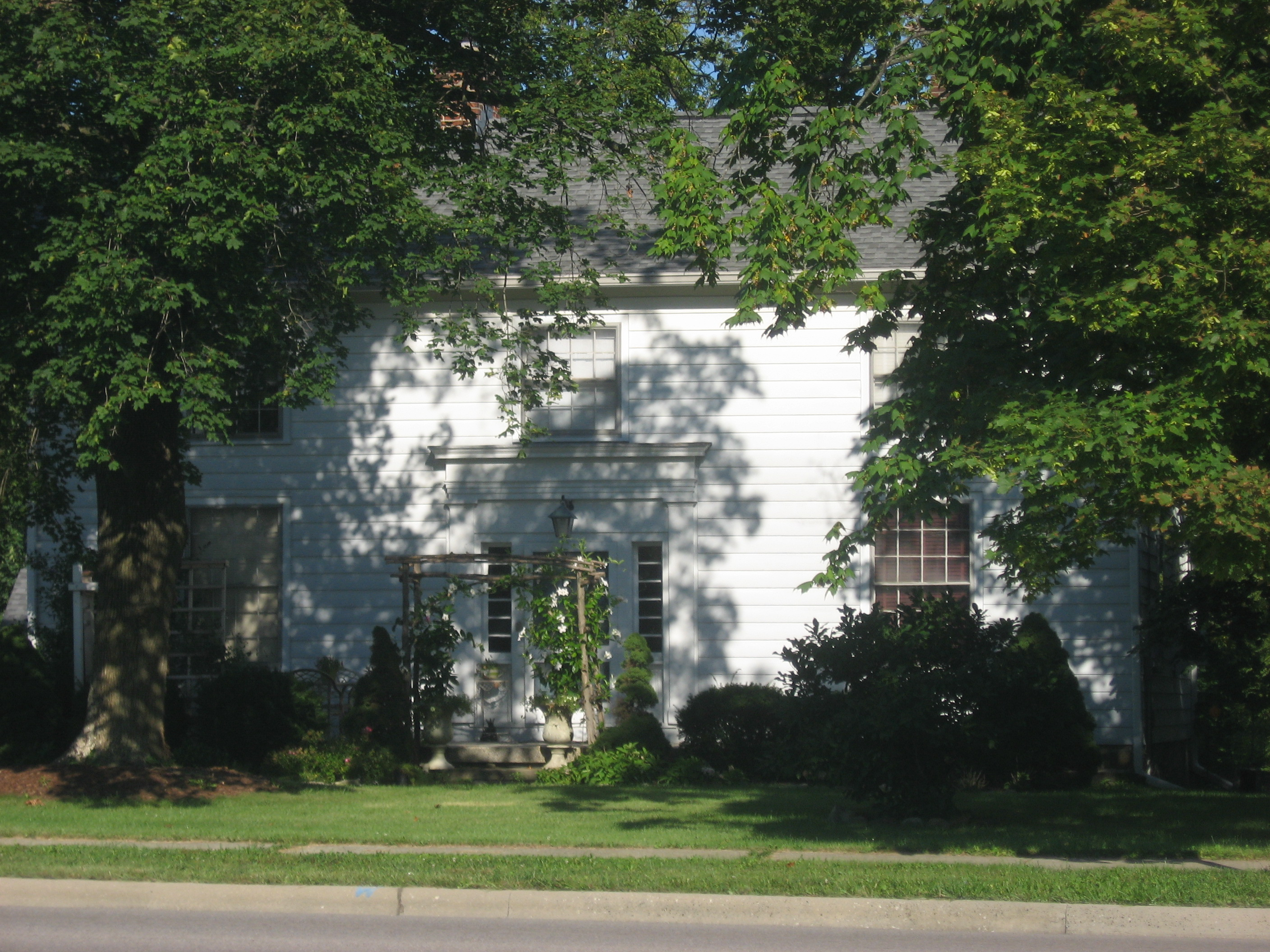
- Front of the house

- Location within Ohio Location within the United States
- Location: 6972 Sunbury Rd., Westerville, Ohio
- Coordinates: 40°6′4″N 82°53′18″W
- Area: Less than 1 acre (0.40 ha)
- Built: 1841
- Architectural style: Greek Revival
- MPS: Central College MRA
- NRHP reference No.: 80004246
- Added to NRHP: November 25, 1980

The Presbyterian Parsonage is a historic parsonage in the Central College neighborhood of Westerville, Ohio, United States. Constructed in the 1840s, when Central College was a separate community, it has been named a historic site.

The parsonage is an aluminum-sided structure, two stories tall with a multi-level gabled roof. Two chimneys sit near the roofline, while both the front and side are divided into three bays with windows. The main entrance, placed near the center of the facade, is trabeated, and sidelights are placed on both sides of the doorway, along with high-style pilasters, an entablature, and a frieze. These elements combine to make the house an example of the Greek Revival style of architecture. Despite the aluminum siding, the house's core structure is frame.

Timothy Lee platted Central College in 1849, surrounding a Presbyterian college founded seven years earlier, but financial problems saw the college close in 1850; although it was resurrected as a prep school for the College of Wooster, the school again closed and was sold to a group that operated it as a retirement home for the deaf. Lee had owned much land in the vicinity before platting the village; he reduced his holdings in 1841 by donating the land upon which the parsonage sits, across Sunbury Road from the former college building, and one block north of the Central College Presbyterian Church. Although it was used as a parsonage for much of the nineteenth century, it has since been sold to private owners, who in 1927 moved the house 100 feet (30 m) to the east and turned it to face westward, toward the road.

In 1980, the Presbyterian Parsonage was listed on the National Register of Historic Places, qualifying because of its place in local history and because of its historically significant architecture. It was part of a small multiple property submission of Central College buildings, along with the Central College Presbyterian Church, the old college building, and the Ebenezer Washburn House to the north.
