= Christian Gayman House =

Historic residence in Canal Winchester, Ohio

- U.S. National Register of Historic Places
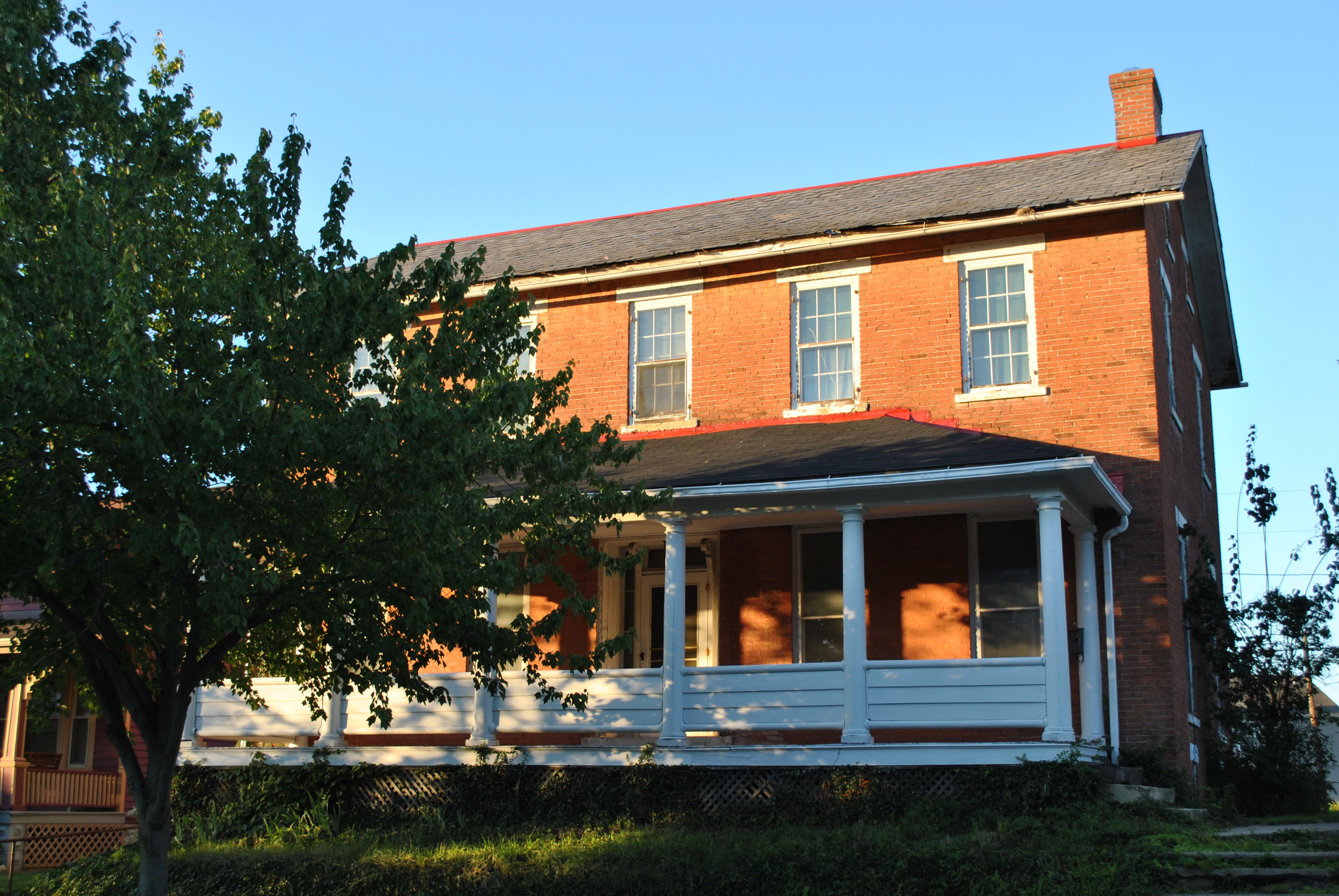
- The Christian Gayman House in 2012

- Location within Ohio Location within the United States
- Location: 110 E. Waterloo St, Canal Winchester, Ohio, U.S.
- Coordinates: 39.8414°N 82.8020°W
- Built: c. 1866
- Architect: Christian Gayman
- NRHP reference No.: 89001037
- Added to NRHP: August 15, 1989

The Christian Gayman House is a historic residence located in Canal Winchester, Ohio. Constructed around 1866, it was listed in the National Register of Historic Places on August 15, 1989.

The home is named after Christian Gayman, one of the local Gayman brothers who were notable merchants in the area during the 1800s. The home was constructed sometime around 1866 by Christian.
