= John Rager Farmhouse =

Historic residence in Madison Township, Franklin County, Ohio

- U.S. National Register of Historic Places
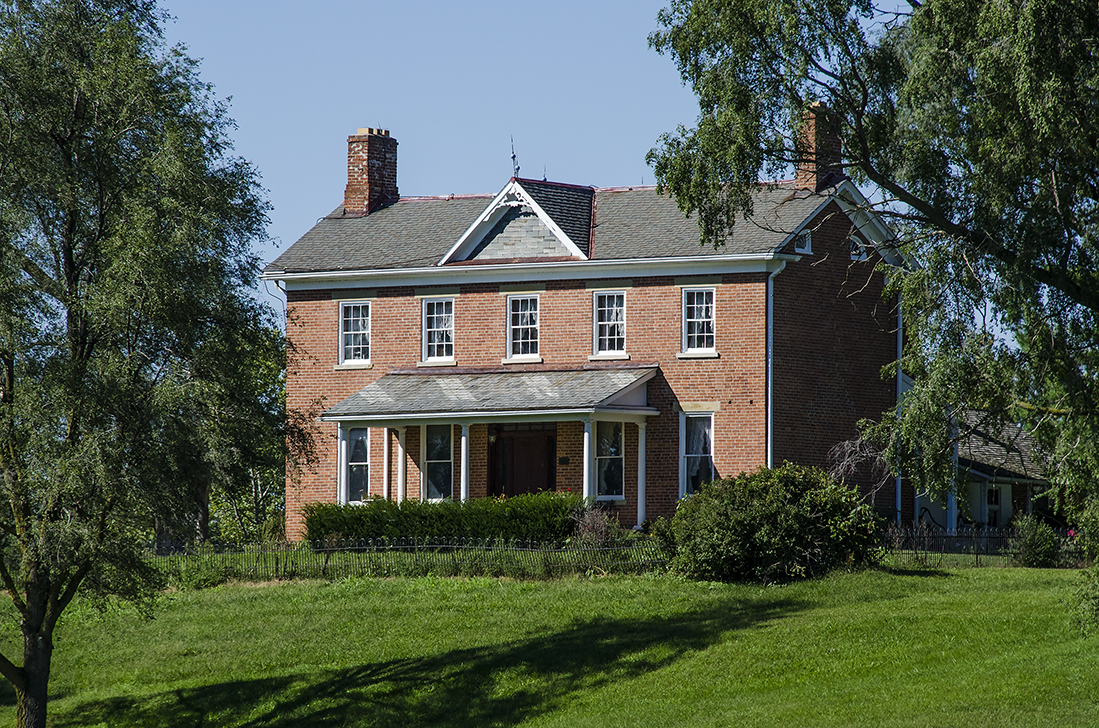
- John Rager Farmhouse in 2014

- Location within Ohio Location within the United States
- Location: 8020 Groveport Rd, Madison Township, Franklin County, Ohio, US
- Coordinates: 39.848472°N 82.852083°W
- Built: Prior to 1835
- NRHP reference No.: 90001498
- Added to NRHP: October 1, 1990

The John Rager Farmhouse is a historic residence and farmstead located in Madison Township, Franklin County, Ohio, roughly two miles west of Canal Winchester. It is listed on the National Register of Historic Places. It is described as a classical I-house.

== History ==
John Rager III was born in Pennsylvania in about 1778. He was one of six children of John Rager, Jr. (1740 – 1844) and Catherine (1761 – 1847). John III would have been a teenager when his family left Pennsylvania. State records show that two of John III's sisters, Elizabeth and Polly, were married in Bourbon County, Kentucky in 1794 and 1798, respectfully. It can be derived from this that the Rager family first migrated to Kentucky from Pennsylvania prior to turning northward for Ohio.

During the late 1780s and early 1790s, the lands north of the Ohio River (the Northwest Territory) were effectively closed to white settlement. An intertribal Native American confederacy fiercely defended their homelands in Ohio against American encroachment. Because central Ohio was a dangerous war zone, thousands of Pennsylvania migrants chose to stop and live in Bourbon County, Kentucky. There, they cleared land, farmed corn, and even helped establish the early foundations of Kentucky's whiskey industry (many early Bourbon distillers were originally Pennsylvania farmers fleeing the Whiskey Rebellion or seeking richer soil). Settlers from Pennsylvania would typically travel down the Ohio River on flatboats. They would disembark at a major river port called Limestone (now Maysville, Kentucky). From Limestone, an established buffalo trail known as the Limestone Trace led directly south into Bourbon County, which at the time covered a massive portion of northeastern Kentucky.

Before the year 1800[1], John Jr. had migrated with his young family to the Pickaway Plains of Ohio, as indicated by the 1880 History of Franklin and Pickaway Counties:

John Rager, who first located on the Pickaway plains came to Washington[2] about 1800. Subsequently, he entered, in connection with his son-in law, Nicholas Miller[3], and a man by the name of Valentine[4], three fourths of section 33 (480 acres). Rager was a great hunter, and was in the forest, with his gun, almost constantly. He killed a number of bears, and a great many deer and wild turkeys. It is said he would kill, sometimes in a single day, five or six deer. It was his custom to keep from two to three hundred hogs, which derived their subsistence from the abundant mast which the forest furnished. He never raised any grain for them, and one winter, which was unusually severe, about one half of them died. The rest he wintered through on venison. His son, John, would follow him with a horse and sled, and take home the deer as his father killed them. Rager finally, when 80 years old, went to Vinton County, where game was more plenty. He lived to be nearly 100 years old.

John was about 26 years old when he married Catherine Valentine (1780 – 1835) in Pickaway Township of Ross County, Ohio (originally part of the Pickaway Plains) on May 4, 1804. Catherine was the daughter of John Henry (1755 - 1838) and Elizabeth Friesz Vallentine (1763 – 1815). Both John Henry and Elizabeth's father were veterans of the Revolutionary War.

John Rager III served as a private in the First Ohio Volunteers under Colonels Duncan MacArthur and James Denny during the War of 1812. Records show that he served from 1812 to 1815. John's younger brother, George, served in the same unit as a musician (fifer).

Five of John and Catherine Rager's six children were born in Pickaway Township of Ross County which is today part of Pickaway County. John purchased land in Madison Township of Franklin County, Ohio in 1814. This parcel of 160 acres was two miles west of the future town of Canal Winchester. The town was named such as the Ohio and Erie Canal came through in 1831. Canal Winchester flourished because of agriculture and transportation. The Ohio and Erie Canal brought passengers, freight, and a means to transport grain to market. The canal also passed through John Rager's land.

In 1826, John completed a handsome brick farmhouse that is still standing today. It is of the "Classical I-House" style and listed on the National Register of Historic Places in 1990. It sits at the corner of Rager and Groveport Roads west of Canal Winchester (8020 Groveport Road). The canal is long gone, but George Creek, during the canal days known as the "Rager's Run" feeder[5] still meanders through the property. John operated a sawmill on this waterway.

Catherine Rager died in 1835 at the age of 55. Little is known of John Rager III after the death of Cathrine other than he died in Marion County, Indiana 35 years later at the age of about 92 (Present-day Indianapolis and its suburbs make up of most of Marion County). His son, John Rager IV, took over the 160-acre farm in Franklin County.

John Rager IV died in Madison Township on February 27, 1885, at the age of 71.The farm was left to his youngest child, Edson Olds Rager. The property remained in the family until 1942 after the death of Edson.

Before the death of John Rager IV and his second wife, Nancy, the family had a monument erected on a plot in the Union Grove Cemetery of Canal Winchester, Ohio. It was manufactured in 1882 by the Monumental Bronze Company of Bridgeport, Connecticut. The Monumental Bronze Company was the only producer of a unique type of grave marker in the United States between 1874 and 1914. During its history, the company produced grave markers cast in zinc made from sand molds that were fused together, sandblasted, and lacquered to produce the bluish-gray finished product that imitated stone. The Rager monument includes plaques that commemorate the lives of John IV, his mother Catherine, both of his wives Elizabeth and Nancy, and three of his daughters; Susan, Sophia, and Sarah who died at the ages of five, six, and one, respectively.

[1] The Pickaway Plains of the Ohio Country opened for American settlement immediately following the Treaty of Greenville in 1795.

[2] Washington Township, Pickaway County, Ohio which is east of present-day Circleville.

[3] Nicholas Miller married Elizabeth "Betsy" Rager in Bourbon, Kentucky in 1794.

[4] Believed to have been Johann Heinrich "Henry" Vallentine, a Revolutionary War veteran whose daughter, Cathrine, married John Jr.'s son, John Rager III, in 1804.

[5] A feeder canal is a canal serving to conduct water to a larger canal.
