= Groveport Log House =

Historical building in Groveport, Ohio

- U.S. National Register of Historic Places
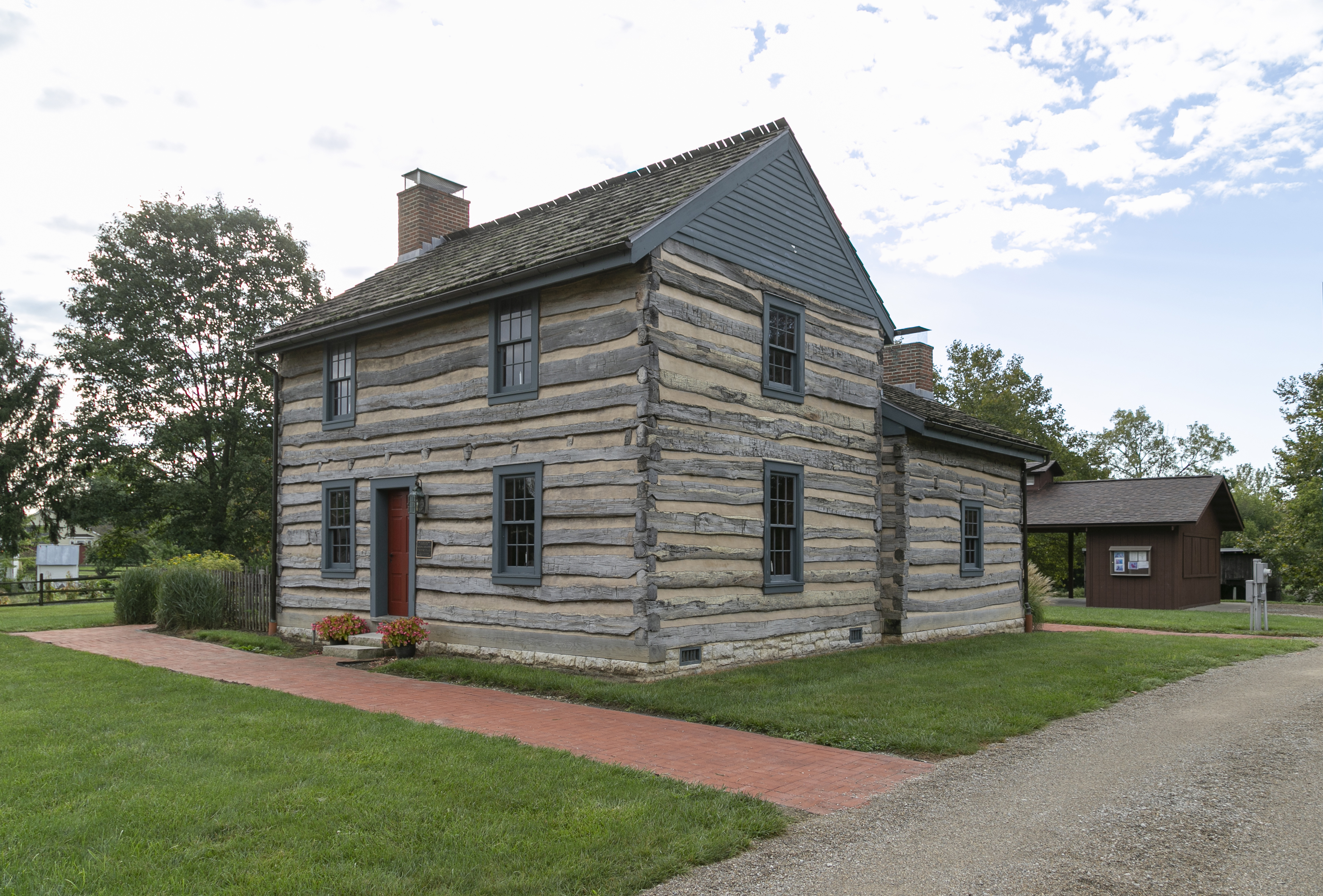
- Groveport Log House in 2021

- Location within Ohio Location within the United States
- Location: 551 Wirt Road, Groveport, Ohio
- Coordinates: 39.849569°N 82.885452°W
- Built: 1815
- NRHP reference No.: 76001428
- Added to NRHP: May 6, 1976

The Groveport Log House (Note: While referred to as "Groveport Log Houses" in the National Register of Historic Places database, there is only one Groveport Log House.) is a historic building located in Groveport, Ohio. Originally constructed in 1815, it was relocated to Heritage Park in 1974 to make way for Groveport's post office. An Ohio Historical Marker is also present at the property.

There were originally two log houses on Main Street, but only one remains and is the one listed on the National Register of Historic Places.

As of 2025, the Groveport Nature Center utilizes the log house for tours and public events.
