= Asher Brand Residence =

Historic house in Ohio, United States

- U.S. National Register of Historic Places
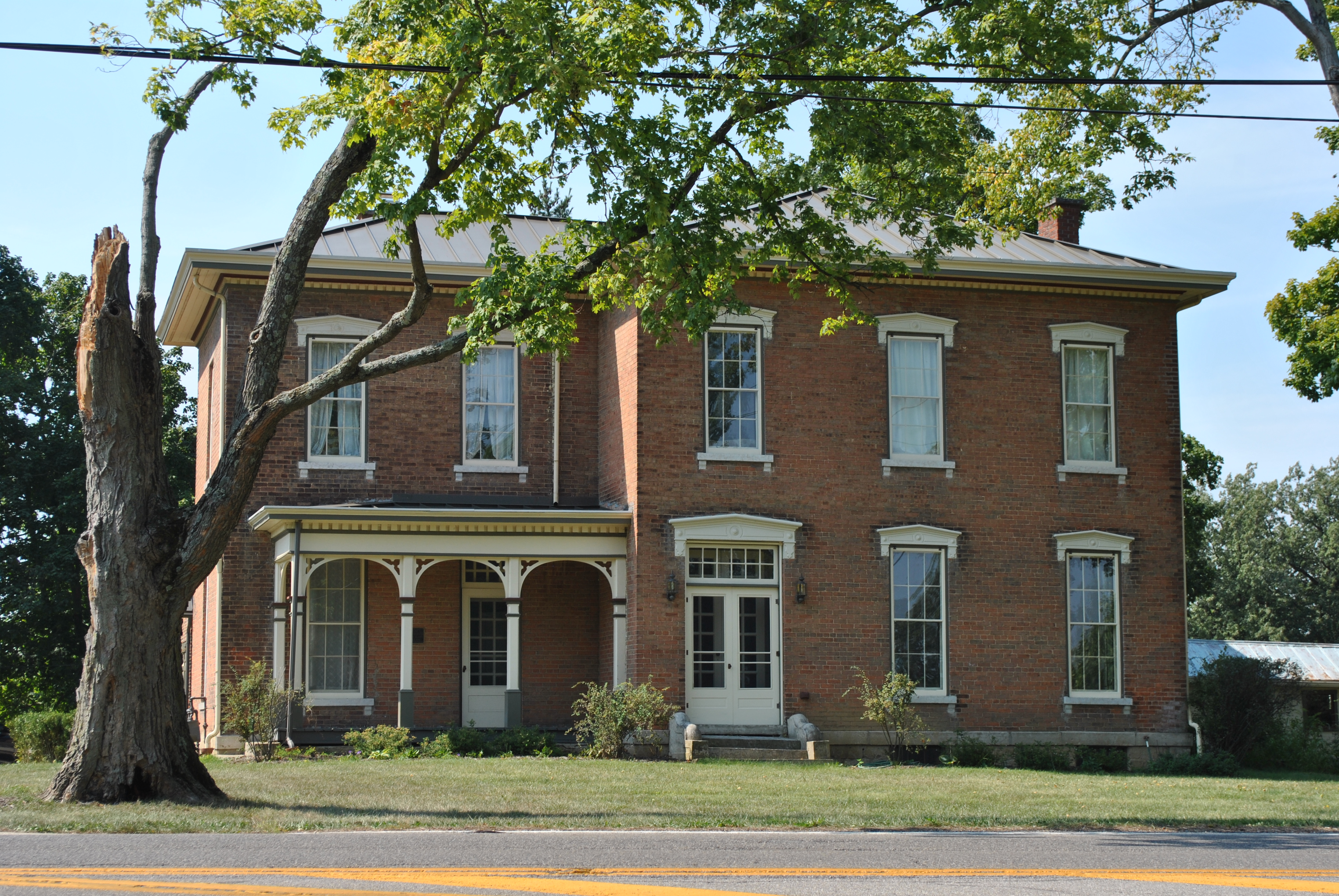
- Asher Brand Residence, 2012

- Location within Ohio Location within the United States
- Location: 5381 Brand Rd., Dublin, Ohio
- Coordinates: 40°07′06″N 83°07′57″W
- Built: 1870
- NRHP reference No.: 79002740
- Added to NRHP: April 11, 1979

The Asher Brand Residence was built around 1870 in Dublin, Ohio, in the early Victorian style. The brick house is two stories and features a hipped tin roof, sandstone sills and lintels, triangular pediments over the front windows and a dentilled cornice. It was added to the National Register of Historic Places on April 11, 1979.
