= Otterbein Mausoleum =

Historic structure in Westerville, Ohio

- U.S. National Register of Historic Places
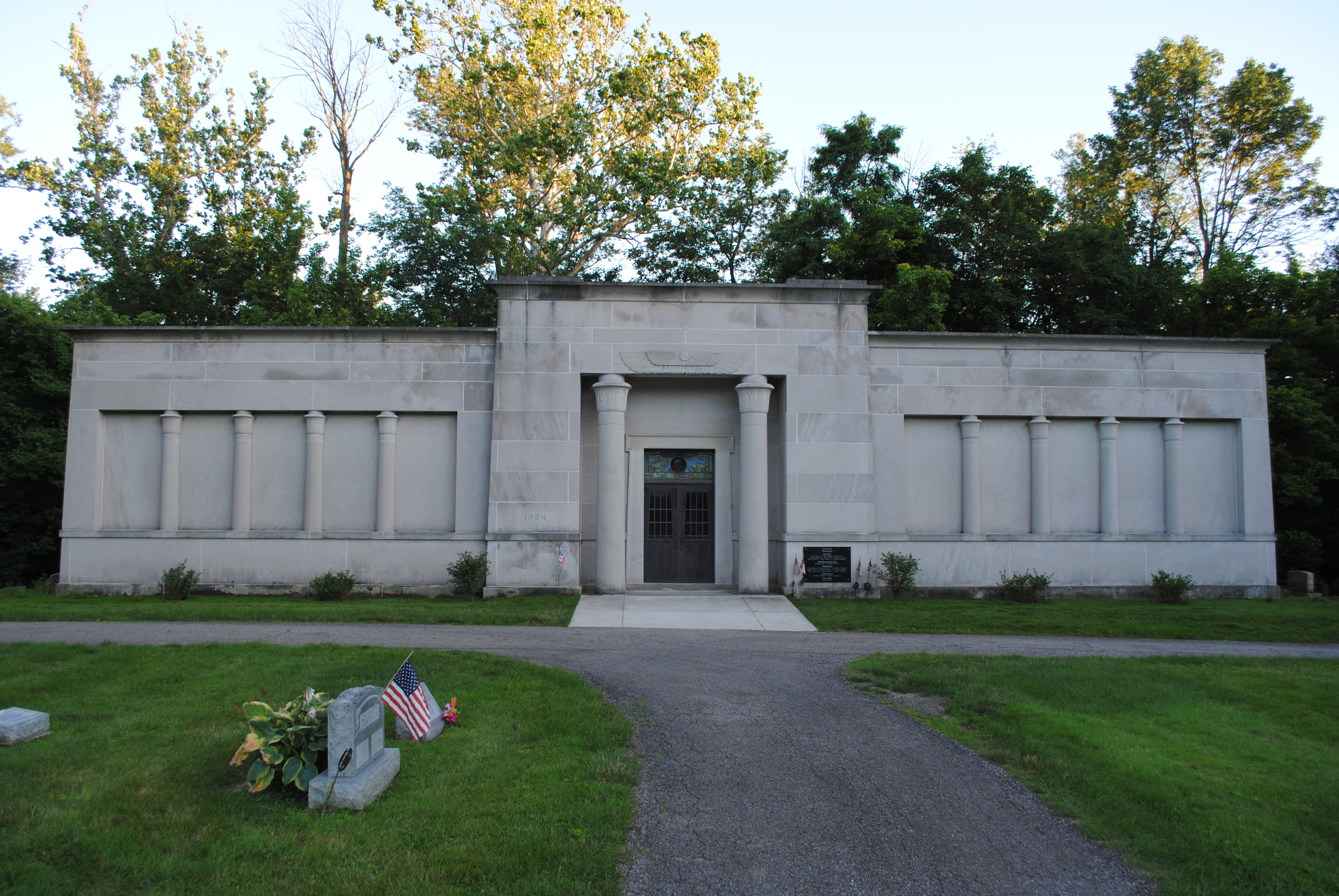
- Otterbein Mausoleum in 2011

- Location within Ohio Location within the United States
- Location: 175 S Knox Street, Westerville, Ohio
- Coordinates: 40.1202°N 82.9361°W
- Built: 1924
- NRHP reference No.: 79001845
- Added to NRHP: November 29, 1979

Otterbein Mausoleum is a historic mausoleum located in Westerville, Ohio, United States, on the bank of Otterbein Cemetery. It was added to the National Register of Historic Places on November 29, 1979.

== History ==
The cemetery in which Otterbein Mausoleum sits was constructed in the early to mid 1800s along with Otterbein University. The mausoleum was originally dedicated on November 30, 1924. It was built by the Columbus Mausoleum Company and has over 280 people entombed. It was added to the National Register of Historic Places in 1979.
