= Barnhardt-Bolenbaugh House =

Historic residence in Canal Winchester, Ohio

- U.S. National Register of Historic Places
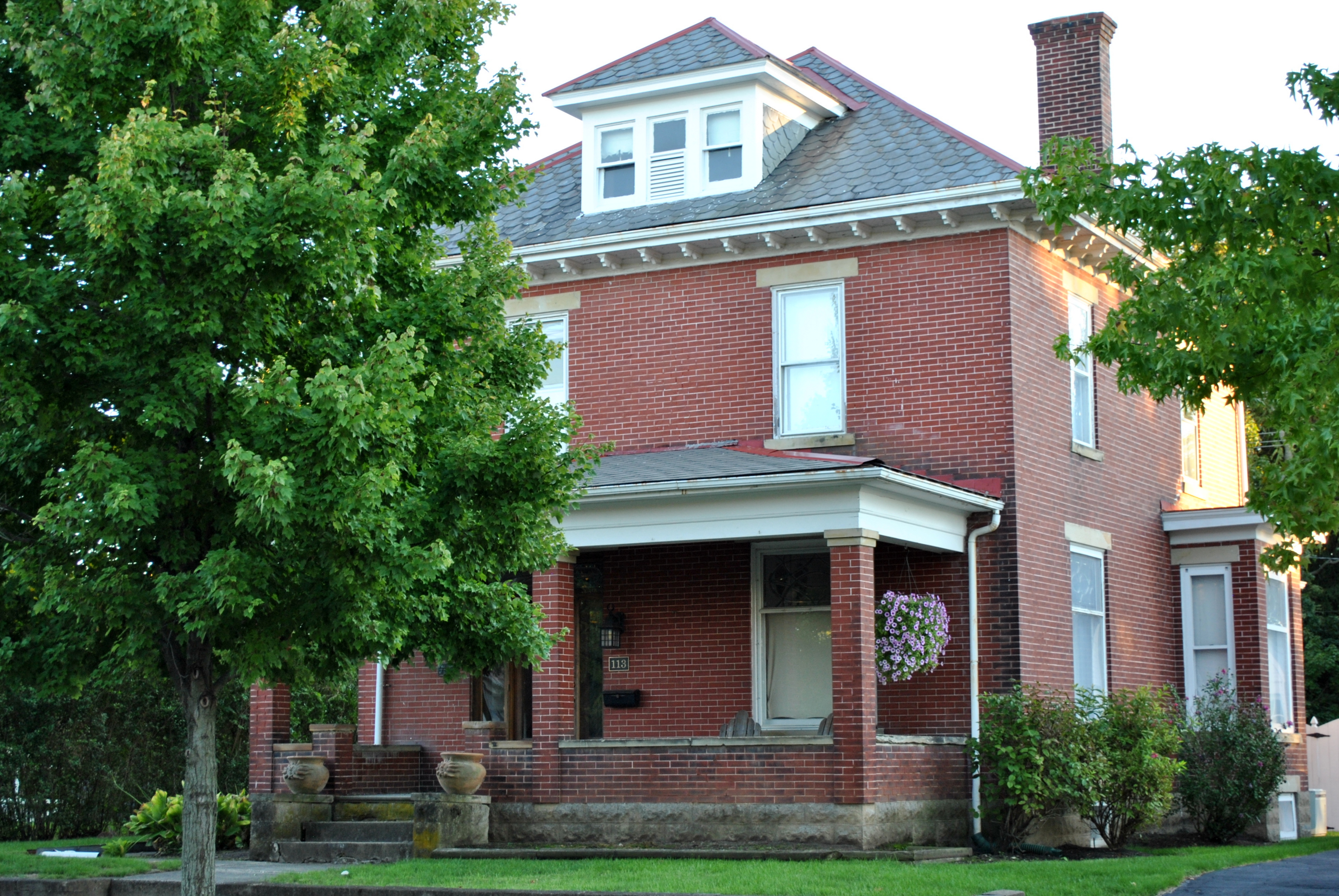
- Barnhardt-Bolenbaugh House in 2012

- Location within Ohio Location within the United States
- Location: 113 E. Waterloo St, Canal Winchester, Ohio, U.S.
- Coordinates: 39.8410°N 82.8020°W
- Built: 1908
- NRHP reference No.: 89001027
- Added to NRHP: August 15, 1989

The Barnhardt-Bolenbaugh House is a historic residence located in Canal Winchester, Ohio. It was listed in the National Register of Historic Places on August 15, 1989.

Originally constructed in 1908, is named after John H. Barnhardt and John W. Bolenbaugh. The home was originally purchased by Barnhardt in 1908 and was inherited by the Bolenbaughs in 1932 after his death. It was listed in the National Register of Historic Places due to its unique architecture.
