= Fletcher Coffman House =

Historic residence in Dublin, Ohio

- U.S. National Register of Historic Places
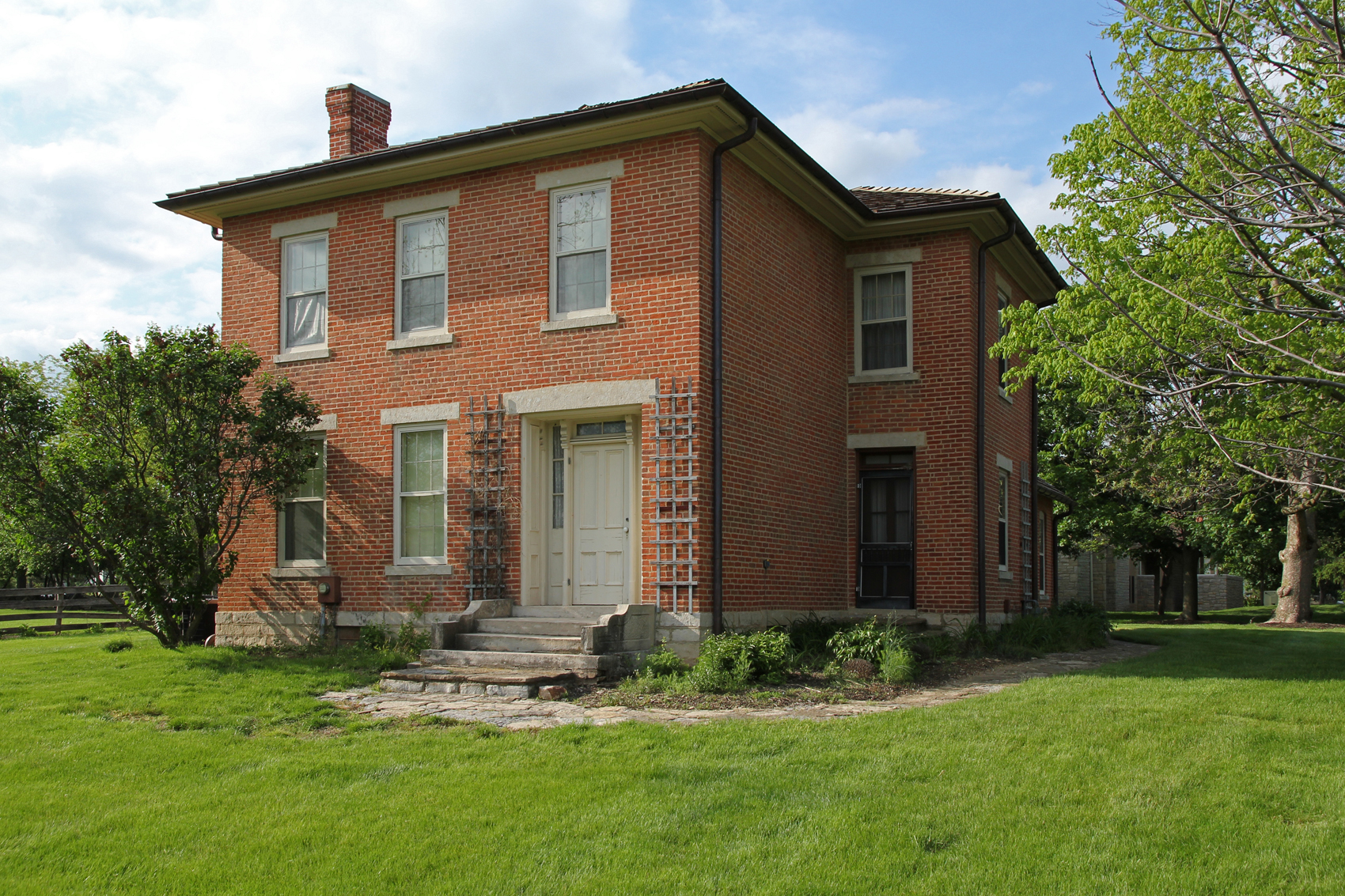
- The Fletcher Coffman House in 2014

- Location within Ohio Location within the United States
- Location: 6659 Emerald Pkwy, Dublin, Ohio, U.S.
- Coordinates: 40.1040°N 83.1338°W
- Built: 1865
- NRHP reference No.: 79002751
- Added to NRHP: April 11, 1979

The Fletcher Coffman House is a historic residence located in Dublin, Ohio. Built in 1865, it was listed in the National Register of Historic Places on April 11, 1979. It is located in the Coffman Park complex and is currently managed by the Dublin Historical Society.

It is named after Fletcher Coffman, who moved into the home with his spouse Marinda in 1867. The Coffman family continued to live in the residence until the 1980s and was owned by Ida Coffman when it was listed on the National Register of Historic Places. The Dublin Historical Society maintains the residence and uses it as a historical museum for the City of Dublin.
