= David's Reformed Church =

Historic church in Ohio, United States

- U.S. National Register of Historic Places
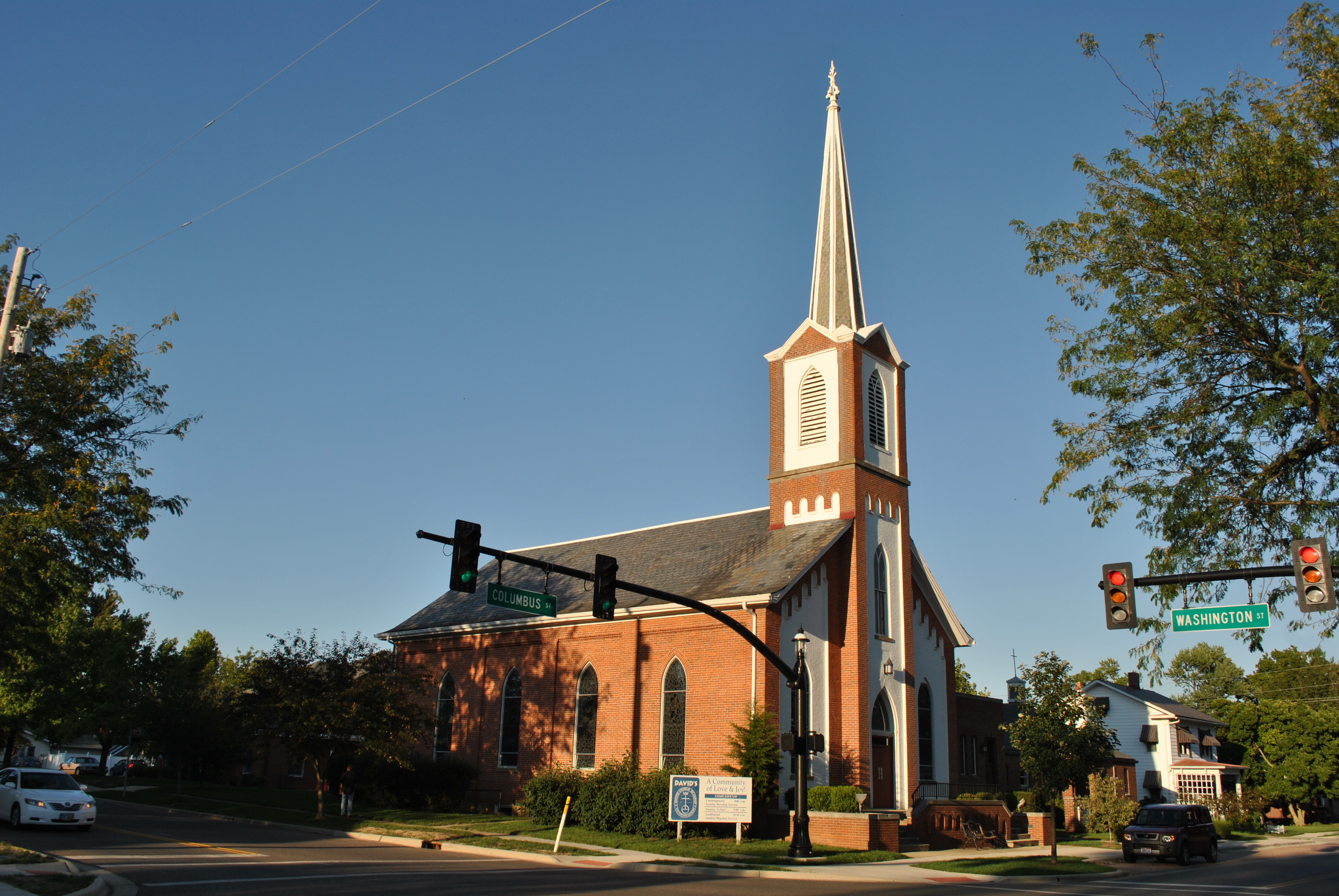

- Location within Ohio Location within the United States
- Location: 80 W. Columbus St., Canal Winchester, Ohio
- Coordinates: 39°50′30″N 82°48′31″W
- Area: less than one acre
- Built: 1881
- Architectural style: Gothic Revival
- MPS: Canal Winchester MPS
- NRHP reference No.: 89001017
- Added to NRHP: August 15, 1989

David's Reformed Church is a historic Reformed church at 80 W. Columbus Street in Canal Winchester, Ohio.

The Gothic Revival church building was constructed in 1881 and added to the National Register of Historic Places in 1989. The church is currently affiliated with the United Church of Christ.
