= Carl H. Shier Farm =

- Carl H. Shier Farmhouse
- U.S. National Register of Historic Places
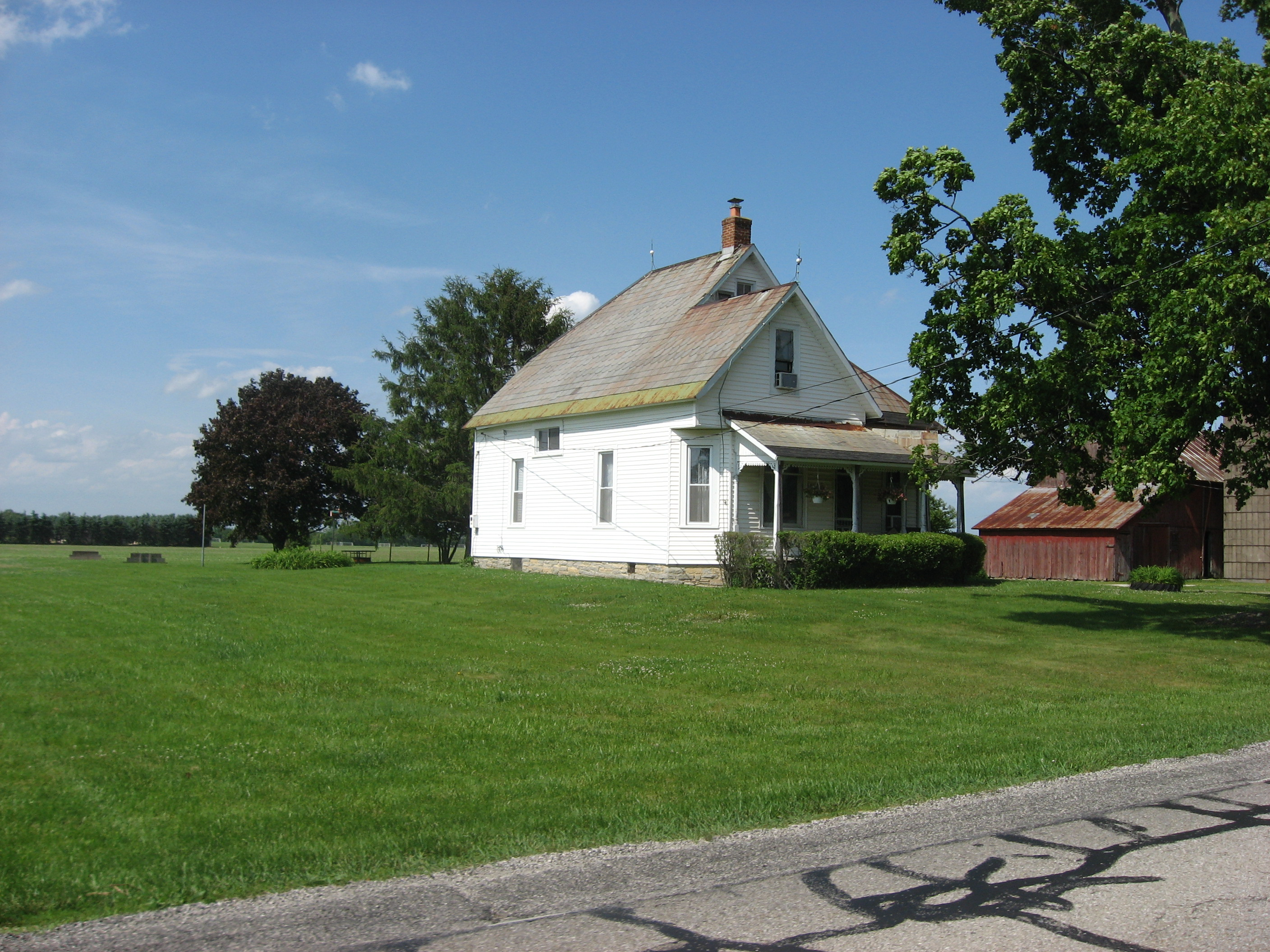
- Carl H. Shier House, 2010.

- Location within Ohio Location within the United States
- Location: 7026 Shier-Rings Road, Dublin, Ohio
- Coordinates: 40°05′38″N 83°11′00″W
- Built: 1900
- NRHP reference No.: 79002865
- Added to NRHP: April 11, 1979

The Carl H. Shier Farmhouse was built around 1900 in Dublin, Ohio, USA, replacing an older house on the property. The house is wood-framed and L-shaped with gable roofs and slate construction. The same family has owned the property for over 100 years.

The house itself, the barn, and the chicken coop, also built around 1900, were all inducted into the National Register of Historic Places on April 11, 1979.

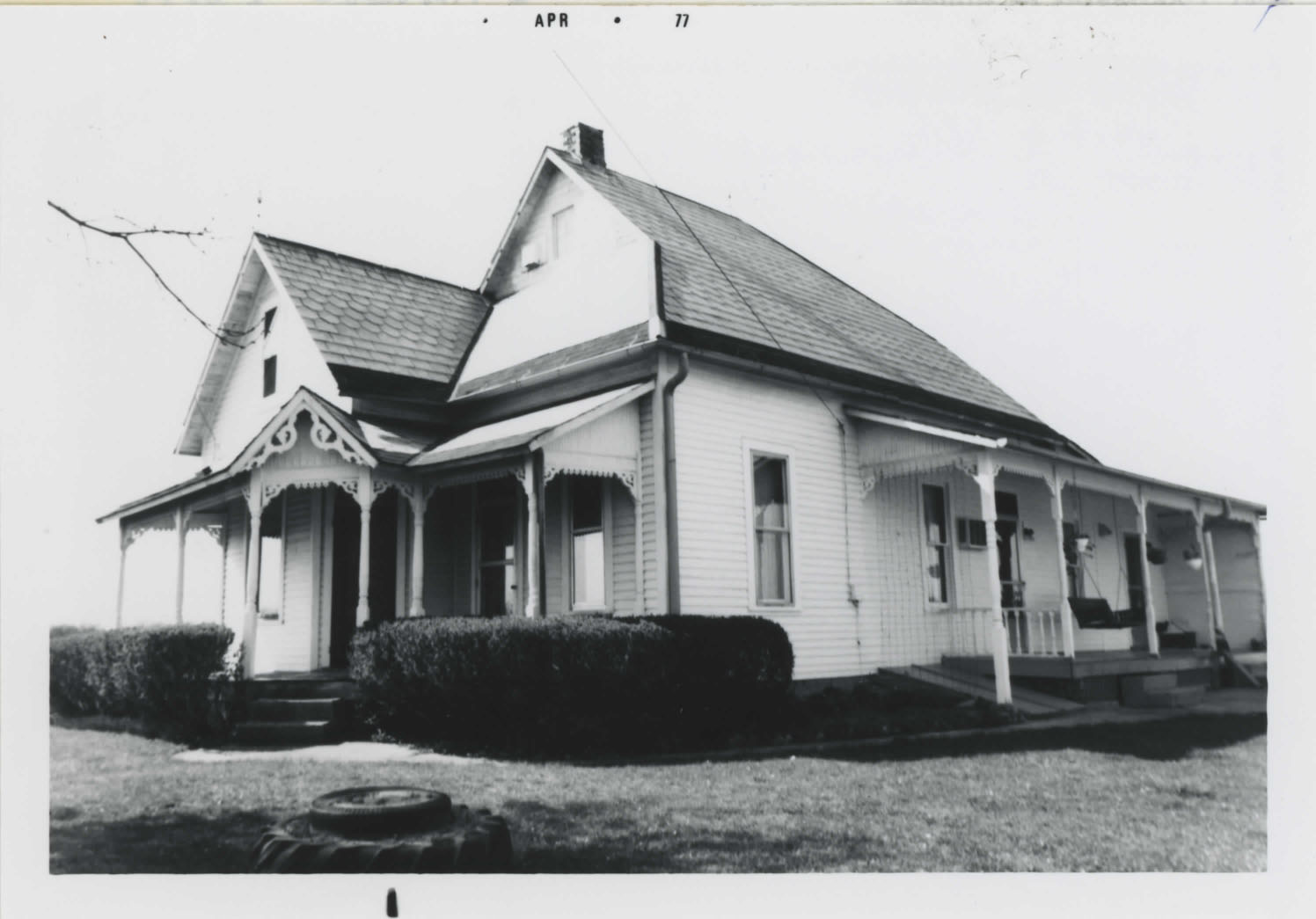
Front of the Carl H. Shier House, located at 7026 Shier-Rings Road, April 1977

== Future plans ==
In 2018, the City of Dublin and Kaufman Development proposed demolishing the structures to create a new residential community to support the planned Innovation District in the area.
