= Bank Block Building =

Shopping center in Grandview Heights, Ohio

- U.S. National Register of Historic Places
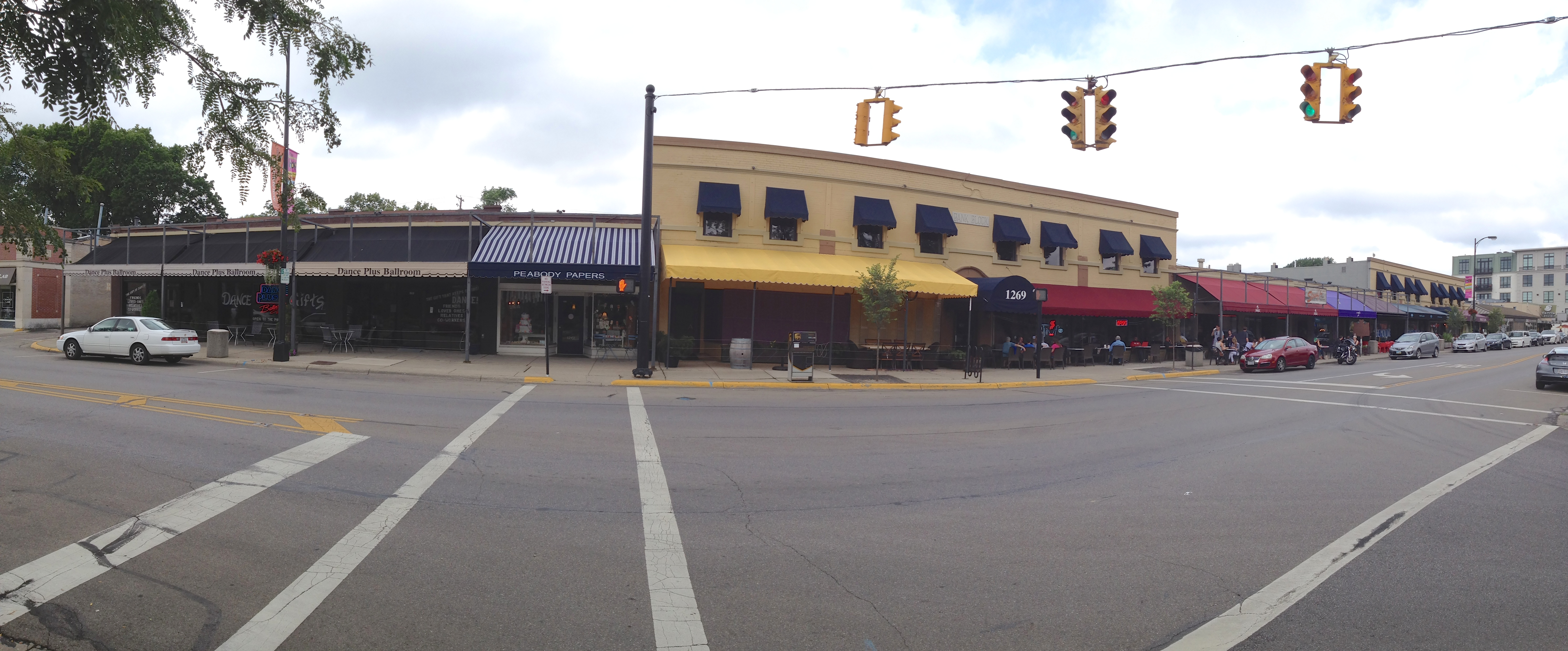
- The Bank Block Building in 2014

- Location within Ohio Location within the United States
- Location: 1255-1293 Grandview Ave, Grandview Heights, Ohio, U.S.
- Coordinates: 39.9832°N 83.0450°W
- Built: 1927
- Architect: Don Monroe Casto Sr.
- Architectural style: Colonial Revival
- NRHP reference No.: 97000510
- Added to NRHP: September 15, 1997

The Bank Block Building is a historic business and shopping center located in Grandview Heights, Ohio. Originally constructed in 1927, it was listed in the National Register of Historic Places on September 15, 1997. It is one of the oldest regional shopping centers still standing in the United States.

The building incorporates Colonial Revival architecture. It was noteworthy for containing 350 free parking spaces, which was rare at the time. It is known as the Bank Block Building because its original main anchor tenant was First Citizens Trust, later renamed to the Ohio National Bank. An Ohio Historical Marker was unveiled at the property on June 14, 2001.

== History ==
The current Bank Block Building was built in 1927 and designed by Don Monroe Casto Sr., a local retail developer. It opened in 1928 and featured actors from the Our Gang film series. After Casto sold the property in 1932 and a transfer of ownership later occurred to Cadiz Methodist Church. By the 1970s, it had fallen into disrepair and was facing the risk of demolition. Thomas Wagenbrenner, along with his brothers, purchased and renovated the building in 1976, saving it from demolition.
