= O.P. Chaney Grain Elevator =

Historic structure in Canal Winchester, Ohio

- U.S. National Register of Historic Places
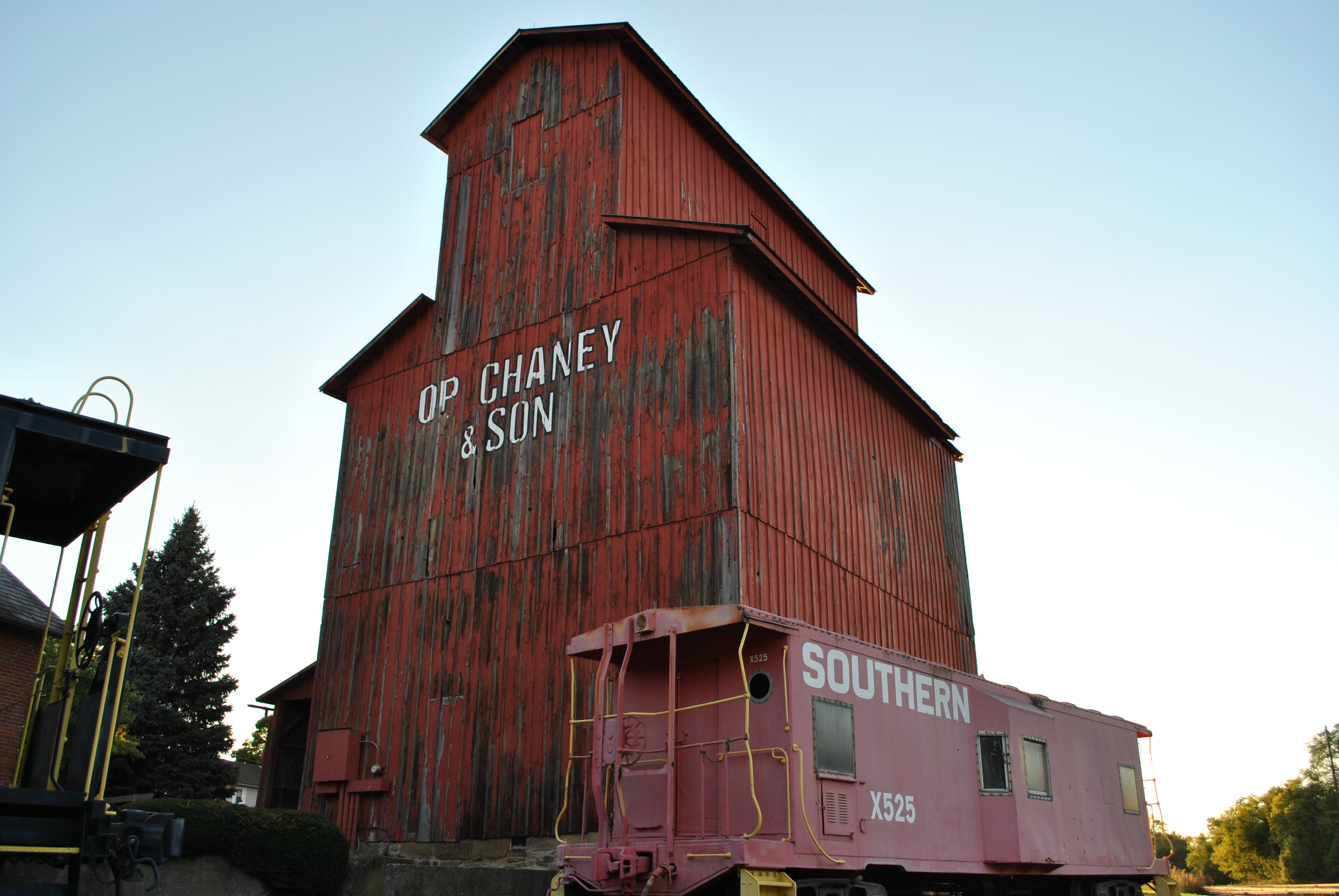
- O.P. Chaney Grain Elevator in 2012

- Location within Ohio Location within the United States
- Location: 10 W Oak Street, Canal Winchester, Ohio
- Coordinates: 39.8454°N 82.8062°W
- Built: 1880
- NRHP reference No.: 87002551
- Added to NRHP: January 28, 1988

The O.P. Chaney Grain Elevator is a historic grain elevator located in Canal Winchester, Ohio. It was constructed in 1880 and is named after O.P. Chaney, a local grain merchant.

== History ==
The original structure was built around 1880. It was a vital part of the local economy at the time, with local farmers frequently using it to store their grain for future transport. The complex surrounding it was demolished in 1987. In early 2023, restoration began by the Canal Winchester Historical Society as Elevate 1828, turning it into an event venue while maintaining the original structure. In June 2024, the state gave $1.8 million to the restoration project through the OTSCIF program.
