= Dr. L.W. Beery House =

Historic residence in Canal Winchester, Ohio

- U.S. National Register of Historic Places
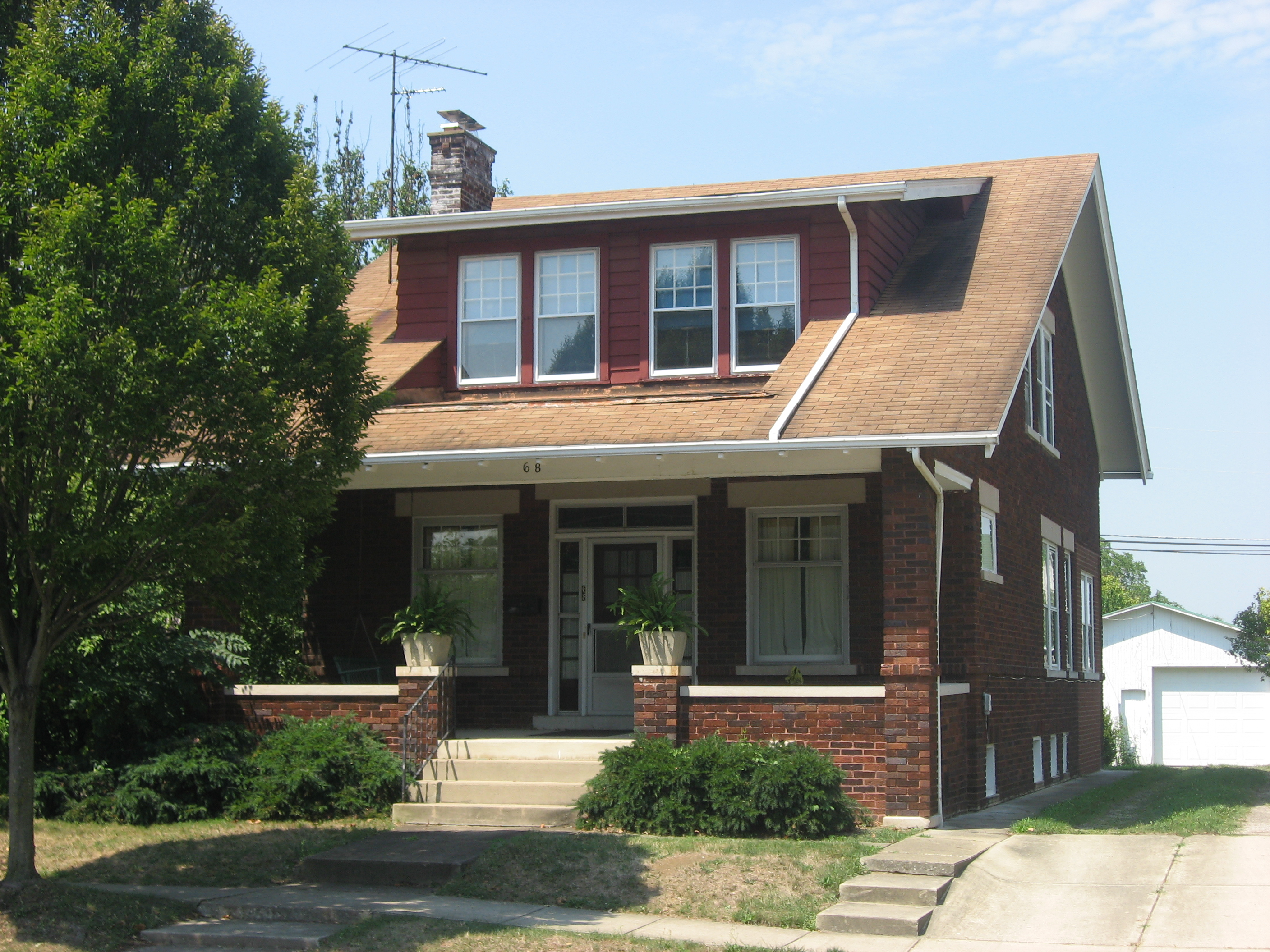
- The L.W. Beery House in 2012

- Location within Ohio Location within the United States
- Location: 68 Washington St, Canal Winchester, Ohio, U.S.
- Coordinates: 39.8421°N 82.8088°W
- Built: 1912
- NRHP reference No.: 89001033
- Added to NRHP: August 15, 1989

The Dr. L.W. Beery House, also known as the L.W. Beery House, is a historic residence located in Canal Winchester, Ohio. Originally built in 1912, it was listed in the National Register of Historic Places on August 15, 1989.

The home is the earliest known Bungalow style house in Canal Winchester. It is named after Dr. L.W. Beery, who moved to Canal Winchester in 1911. His daughter inherited the home after his death and owned it until 1963.
