= Artz House =

Historic house in Ohio, United States

- U.S. National Register of Historic Places
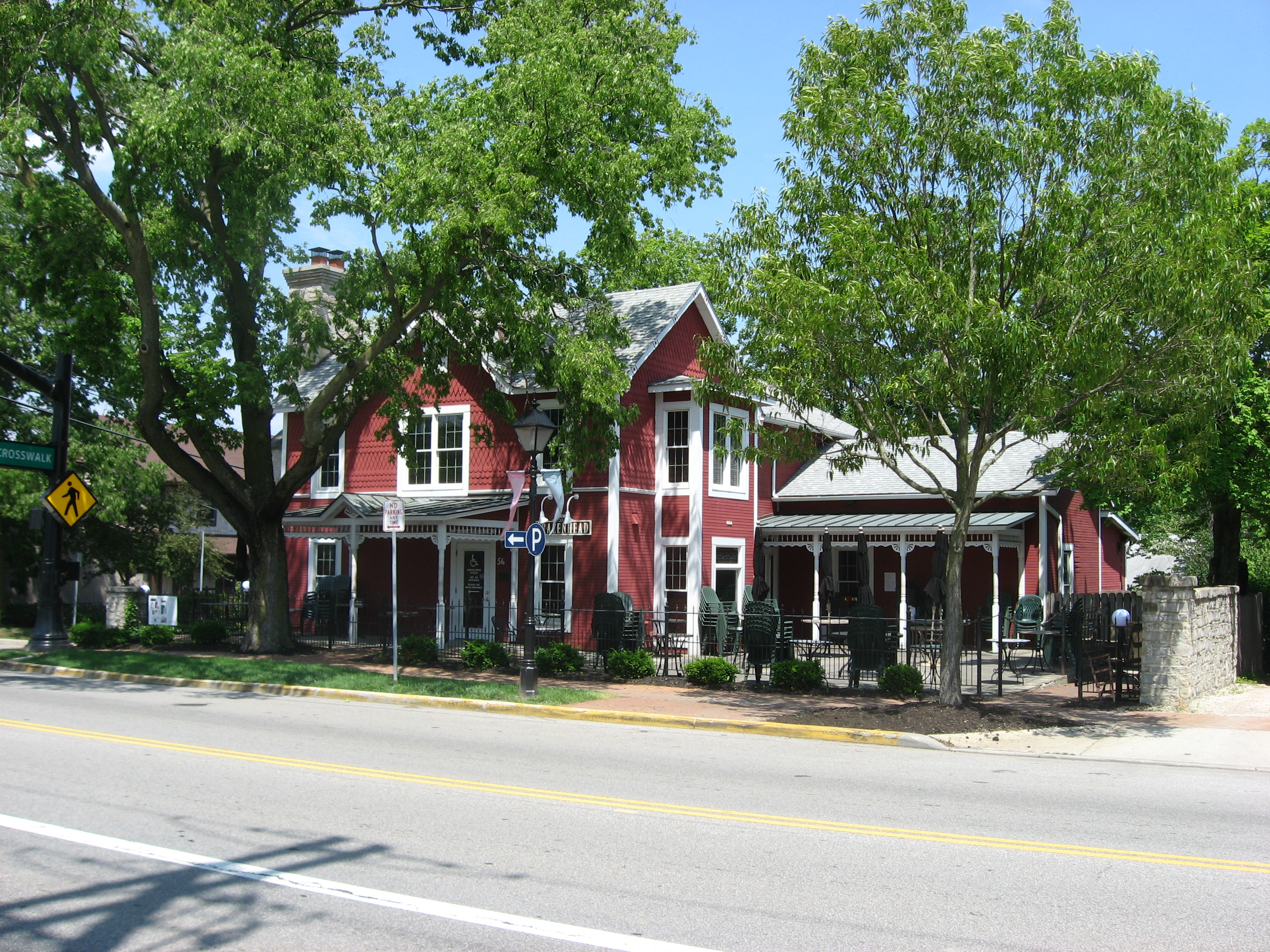
- Front of the Artz House

- Location within Ohio Location within the United States
- Location: Dublin, Ohio
- Coordinates: 40°6′2.76″N 83°6′50.49″W
- Built: ca 1870
- MPS: Washington Township MRA
- NRHP reference No.: 79002901
- Added to NRHP: 1979-04-11

Artz House is a registered historic building in Dublin, Ohio, listed in the National Register on 1979-04-11.

== Historic uses ==
The Artz House is a single-family dwelling built by Harry Artz and his wife Sally Thomas around 1870.
