= Brelsford-Seese House =

Historic house in Ohio, United States

- U.S. National Register of Historic Places
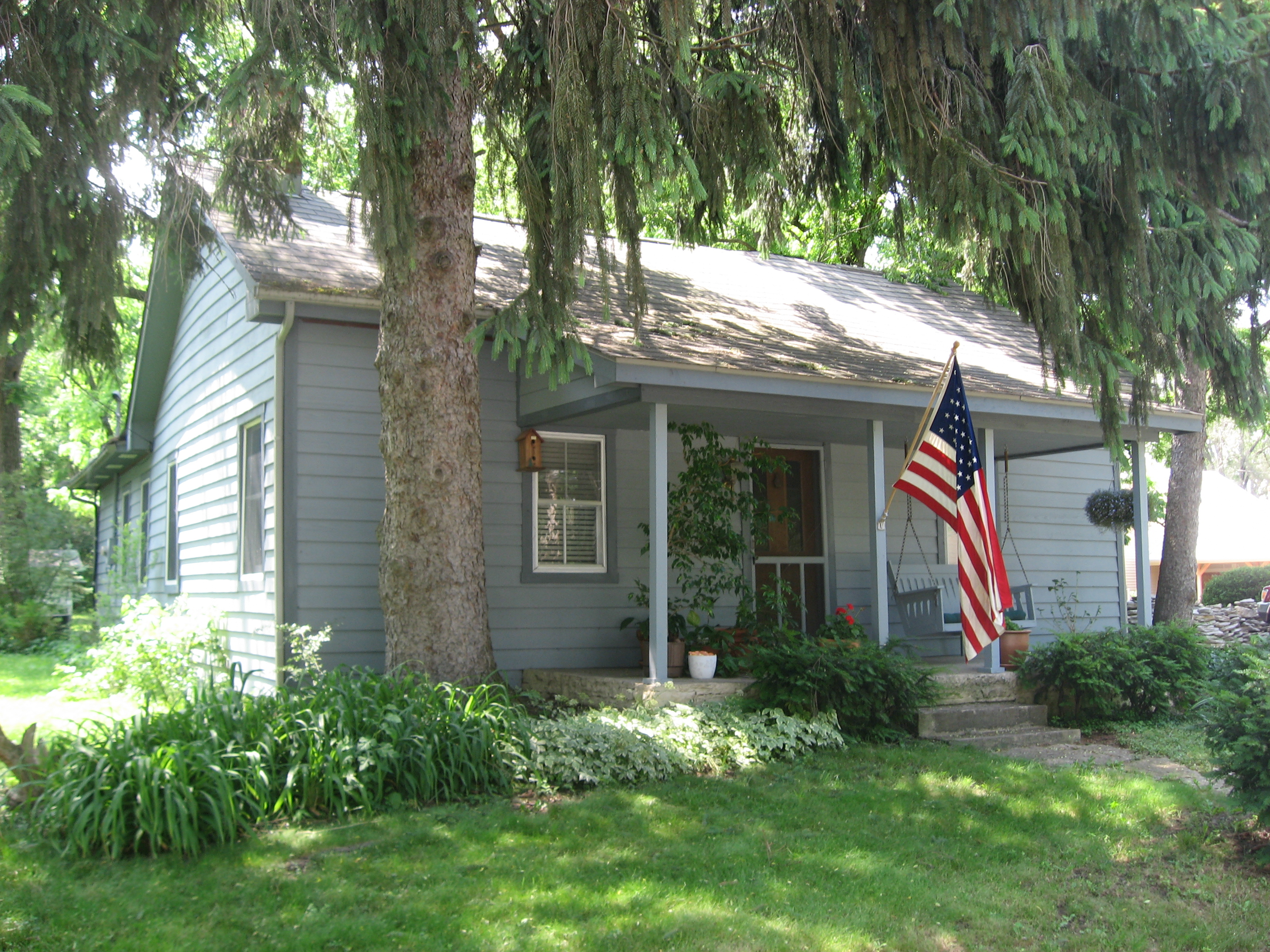
- Brelsford-Seese House, 2010.

- Location within Ohio Location within the United States
- Location: 129 Riverview St., Dublin, Ohio
- Coordinates: 40°05′49″N 83°06′44″W
- Built: 1850
- NRHP reference No.: 79002888
- Added to NRHP: April 11, 1979

The Brelsford-Seese House is a one-story wood-frame house located in Dublin, Ohio. It was built around 1850 and owned by Mr. Hutchinson in 1856 and A.S. Breisfold in 1972. The vernacular-style home is said to be a station on the Underground Railroad. It was added to the National Register of Historic Places on April 11, 1979
