= Karrer Barn =

Historic barn in Dublin, Ohio

- U.S. National Register of Historic Places
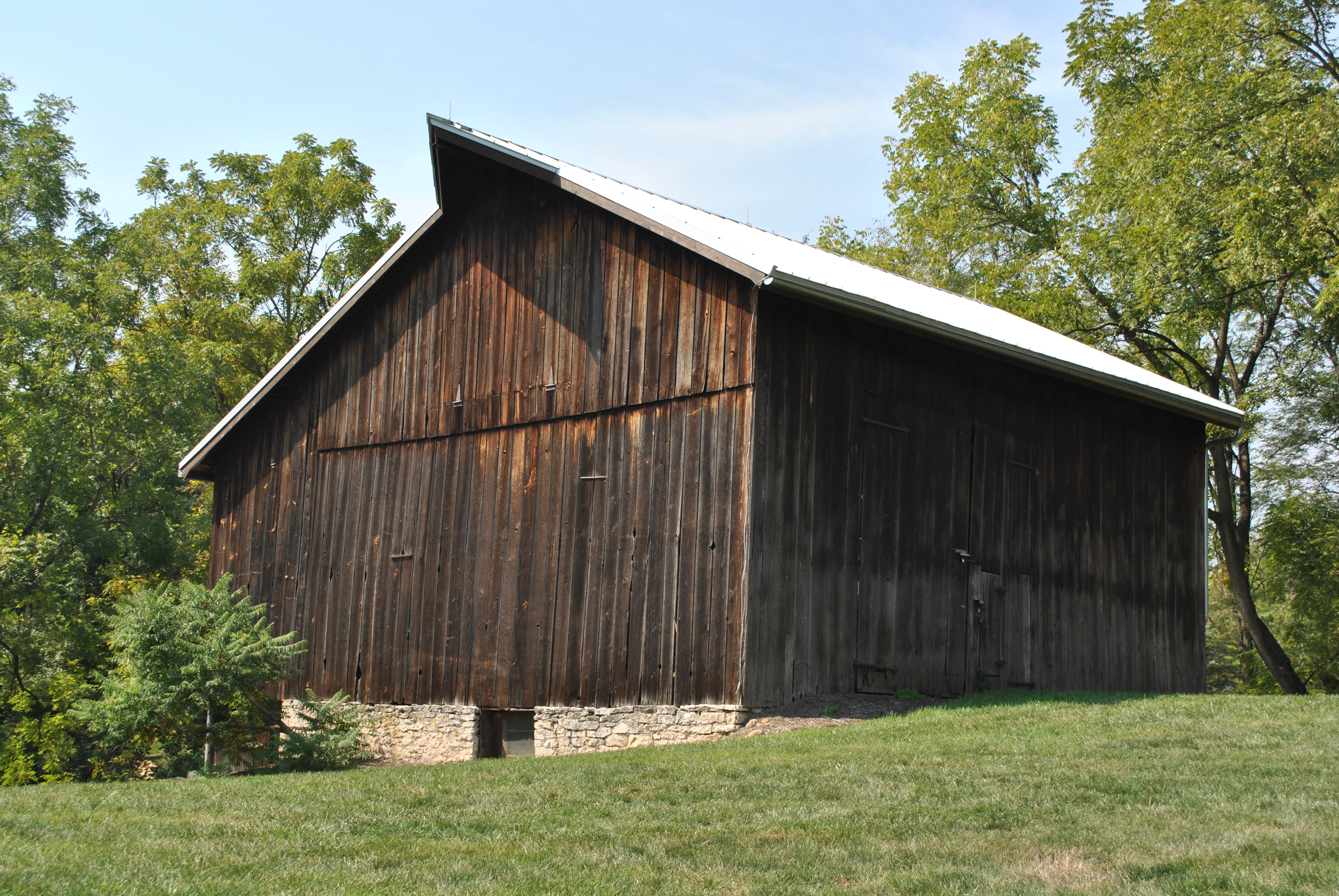
- Karrer Barn in 2012

- Location within Ohio Location within the United States
- Location: 6199 Dublin Rd, Dublin, Ohio
- Coordinates: 40.09516°N 83.11358°W
- Built: 1876
- Architect: George Michael Karrer
- NRHP reference No.: 79002788
- Added to NRHP: April 11, 1979

The Karrer Barn is a historic barn located in Dublin, Ohio. Named after locals Emmett Karrer and George Michael Karrer, it was listed on the National Register of Historic Places in 1979. It is a bank barn.

== History ==
Karrer Barn was built in 1876 by Emmett Karrer's grandfather, George Michael Karrer. The barn has not been renovated or restored since, with the exception of new flooring at an unknown point in the past.
