= Bruns-Wynkoop House =

Historic residence in Canal Winchester, Ohio

- U.S. National Register of Historic Places
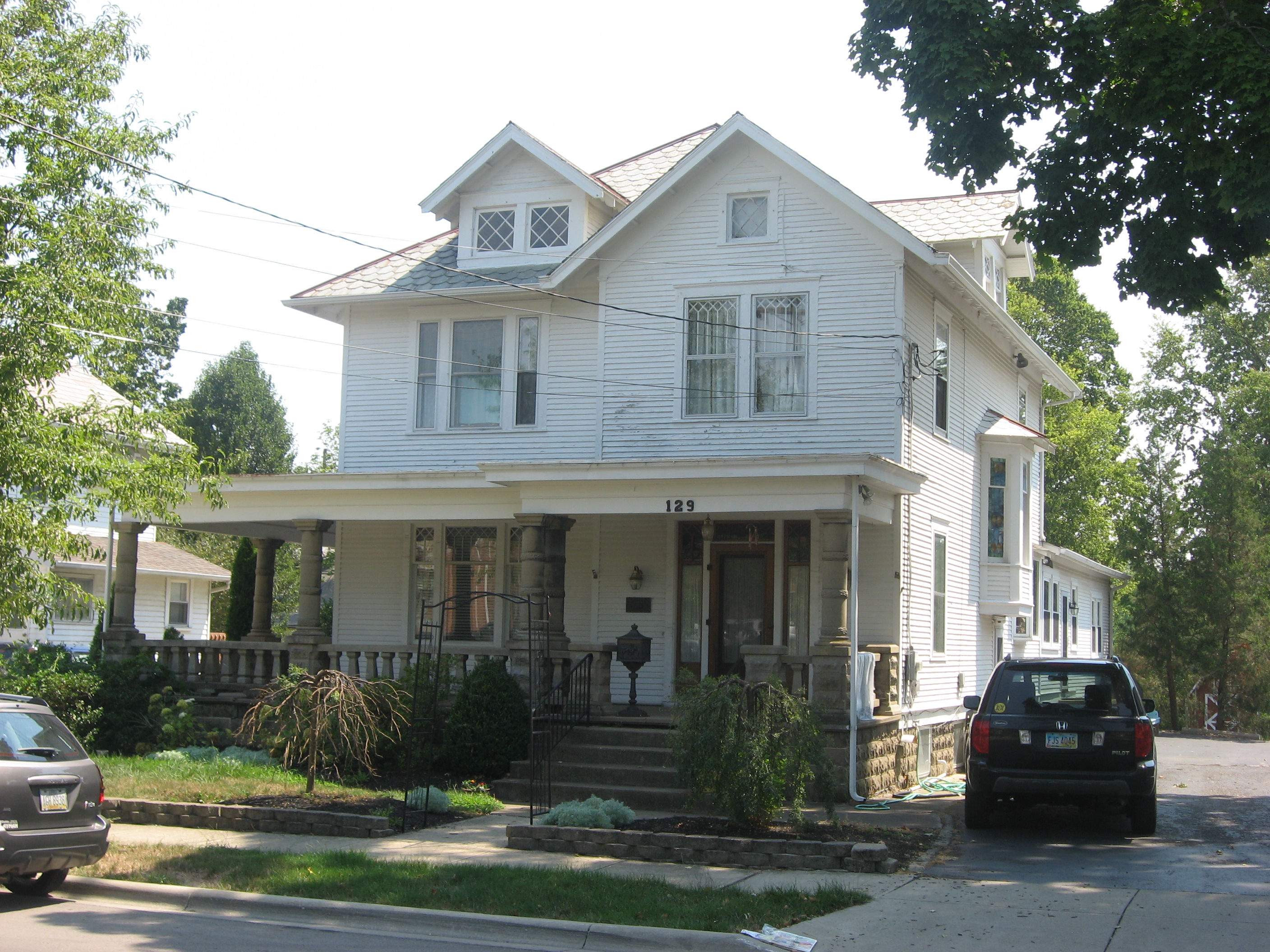
- Bruns-Wynkoop House in 2012

- Location within Ohio Location within the United States
- Location: 129 Washington St, Canal Winchester, Ohio, U.S.
- Coordinates: 39.8403°N 82.8086°W
- Built: 1912
- Architect: Clarence Hoffman
- Architectural style: Classical Revival
- NRHP reference No.: 89001023
- Added to NRHP: August 15, 1989

The Bruns-Wynkoop House is a historic residence located in Canal Winchester, Ohio. It was listed in the National Register of Historic Places on August 15, 1989.

Designed by Clarence Hoffman, the house generally follows the American Foursquare style, with elements of Classical Revival present as well in the exterior. It is named after Wilson Bruns and John Seldon Wynkoop, the latter of whom purchased the home in 1913. As of September 2025, the Wynkoop family still owns the home. It was added to the National Register of Historic Places due to its architecture and most of the original design still remaining.
