= John Snow House =

Historic residence in Worthington, Ohio

- U.S. National Register of Historic Places
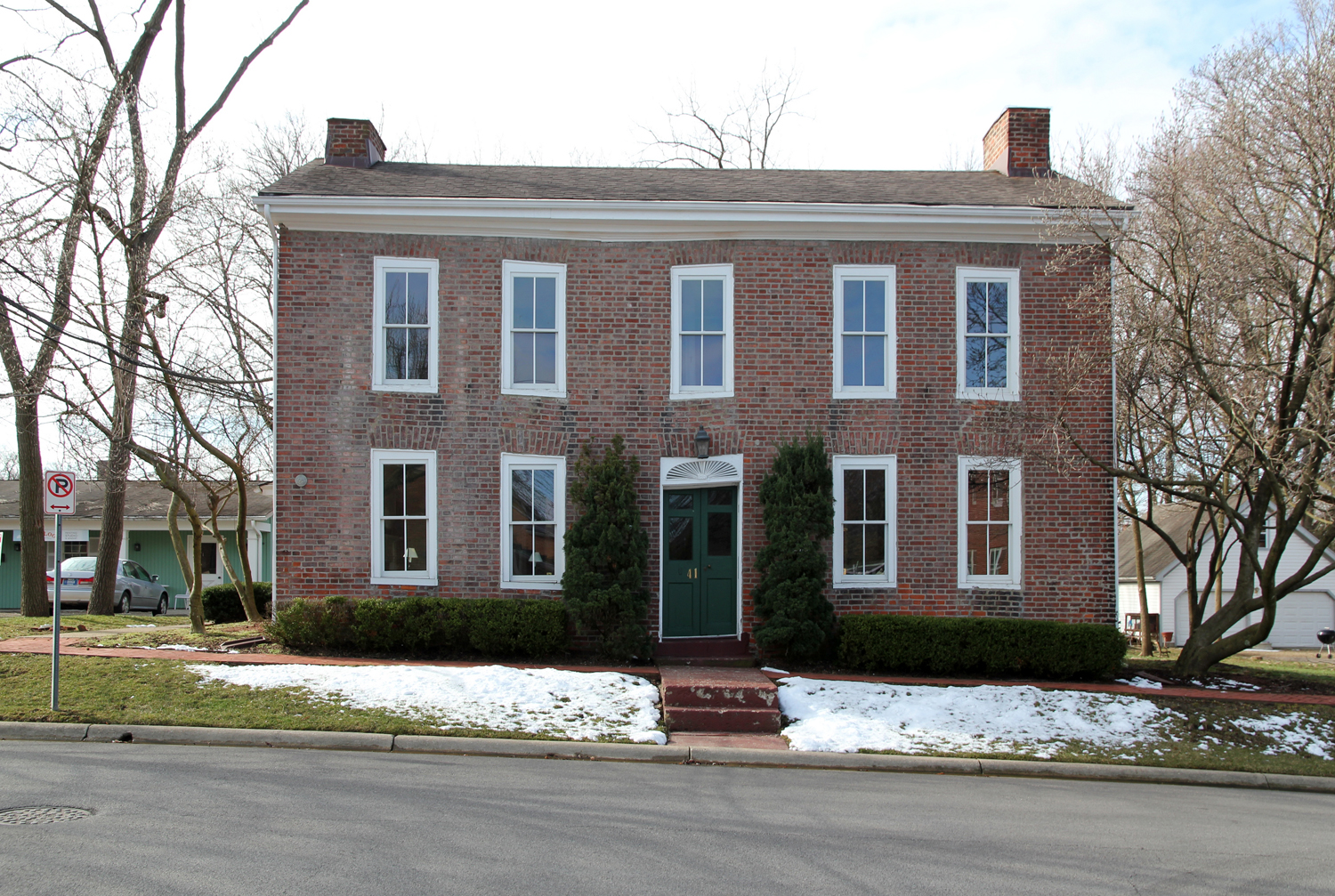
- John Snow House in 2013

- Location within Ohio Location within the United States
- Location: 41 W New England Ave, Worthington, Ohio
- Coordinates: 40.0512°N 83.0109°W
- Built: c. 1815
- NRHP reference No.: 73001445
- Added to NRHP: July 26, 1973

The John Snow House, also known as the Snow House, is a historic residence in Worthington, Ohio. Constructed around 1815, it was listed on the National Register of Historic Places on July 26, 1973.

== History ==
Originally constructed around 1815, it was sold to John Snow in 1817, whom the house is named after. Snow died on May 16, 1852. The rest of the Snow family resided in the home until 1939. It was later owned by the Ohio Masonic Historical Society.
