= Central College Presbyterian Church =

Historic church in Ohio, United States

- U.S. National Register of Historic Places
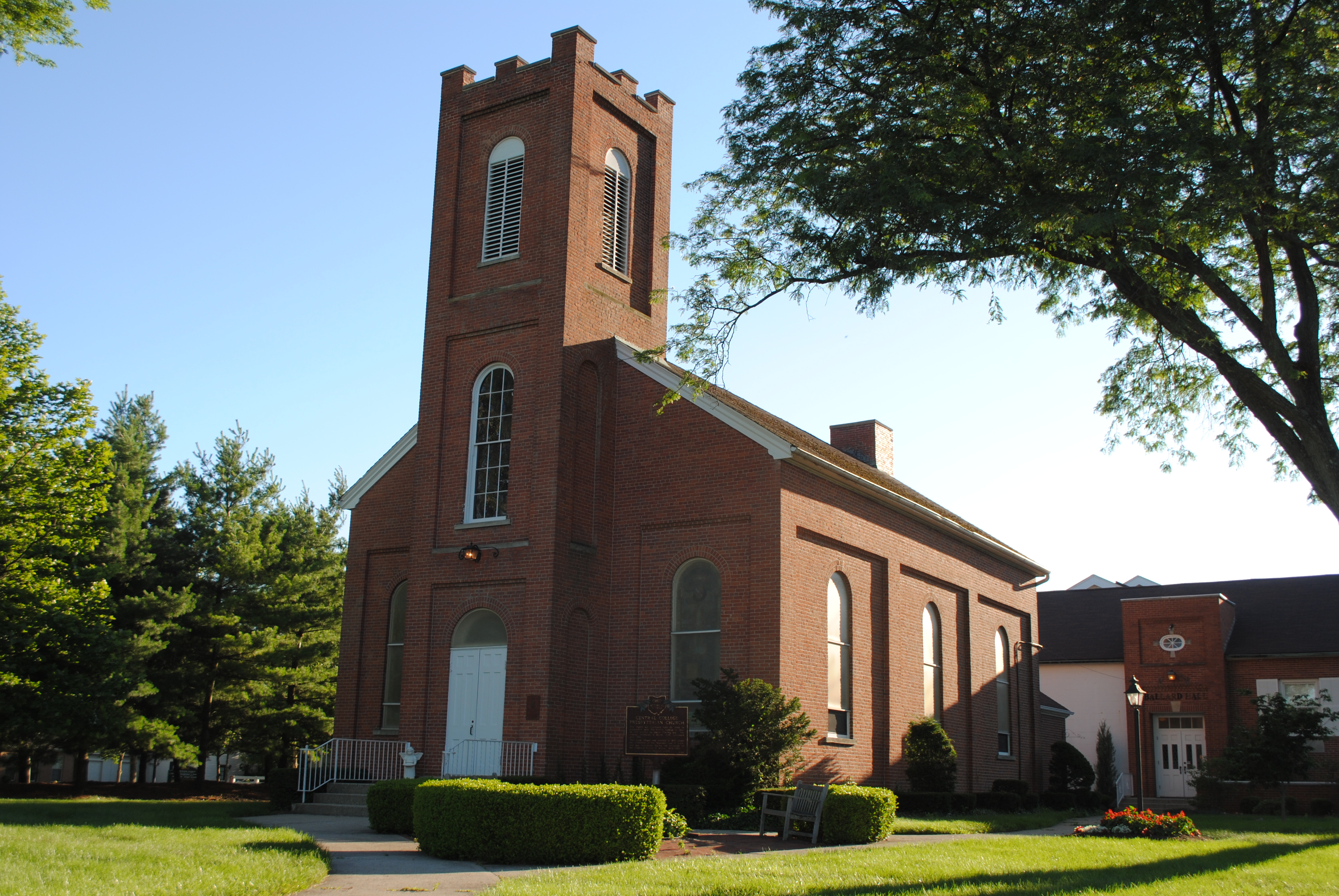
- Front and northern side

- Location within Ohio Location within the United States
- Nearest city: Westerville, Ohio
- Coordinates: 40°5′59″N 82°53′23″W
- Area: less than one acre
- Built: 1870
- Architect: Lyman Day; Stephen Huddleson
- Architectural style: Romanesque
- MPS: Central College MRA
- NRHP reference No.: 80004068
- Added to NRHP: November 24, 1980

Central College Presbyterian Church is a historic Presbyterian church building in Westerville, Ohio.

The Romanesque style building was started in 1870 and was added to the National Register of Historic Places in 1980.
