= Winterringer Building and House =

Historic place in Ohio, US

- U.S. National Register of Historic Places
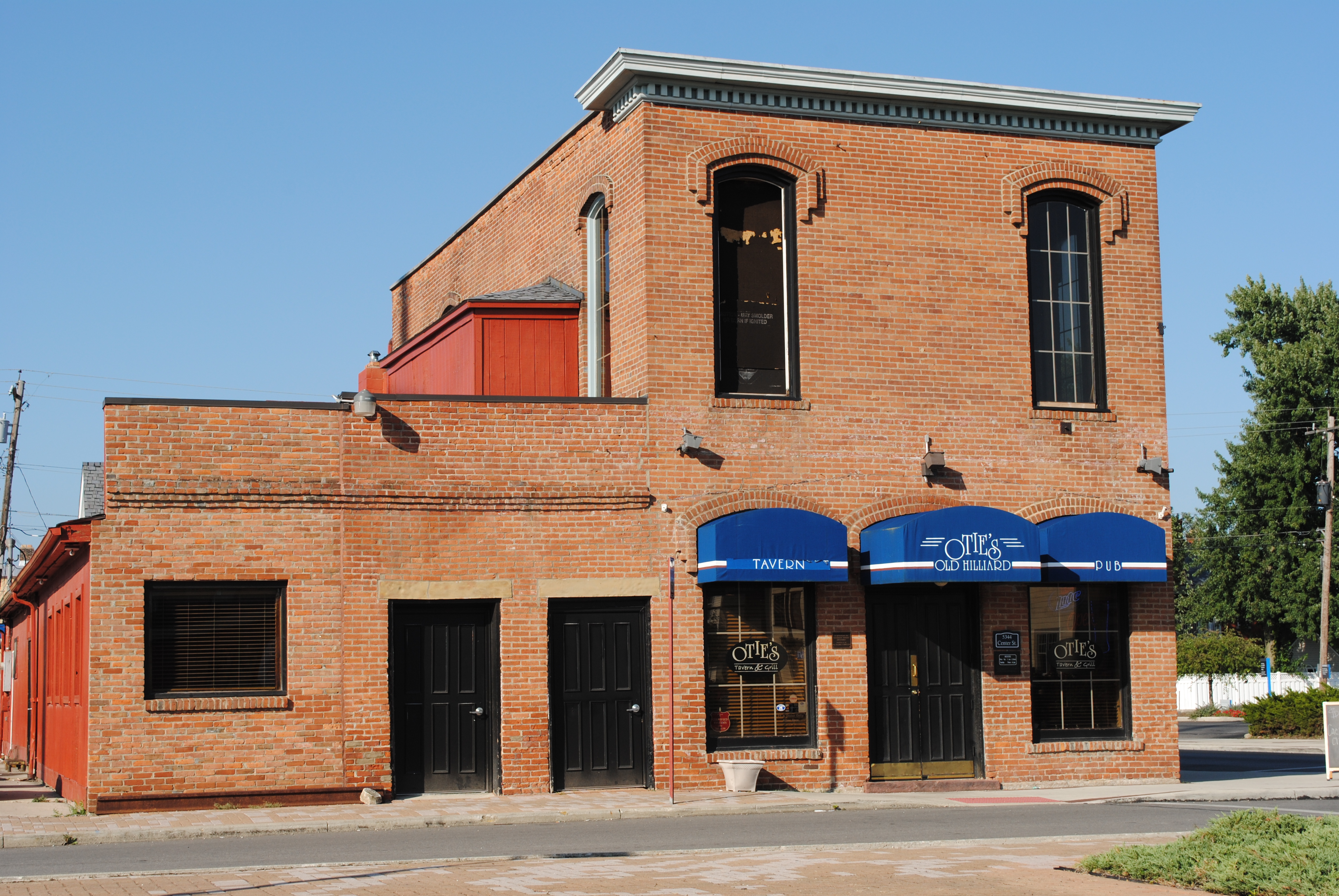

- Location within Ohio
- Location: 5344 Center St. Hilliard, Ohio
- Coordinates: 40°02′02″N 83°09′35″W
- Built: c. 1870
- Architectural style: Italianate, Gothic
- NRHP reference No.: 88000720
- Added to NRHP: June 9, 1988

The Winterringer Building and House is a historic commercial building with an adjacent home, located in historic "Old Hilliard" in Hilliard, Ohio, United States. The property comprises a brick commercial building with an adjacent frame residence used by the buildings owner. The commercial building was built around 1870 in the Italianate style and features a commercial storefront with a pressed metal cornice and arched hood molds. The residence was built around 1880 and is Gothic influenced. It was added to the National Register of Historic Places on June 9, 1988.
