= Times Building-Lodge Hall =

- Times Building--Lodge Hall
- U.S. National Register of Historic Places
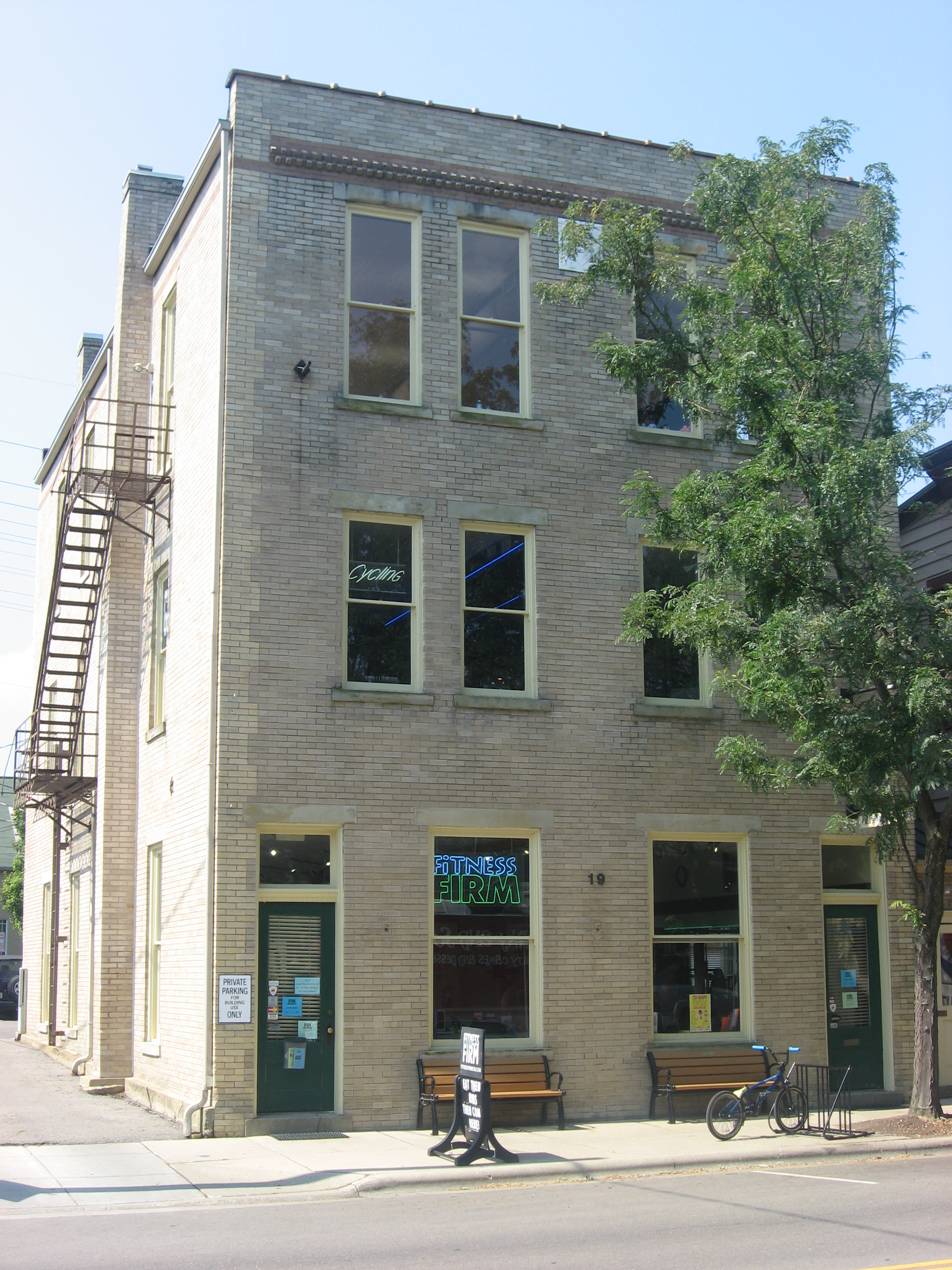

- Location within Ohio
- Location: 19 E. Waterloo St., Canal Winchester, Ohio
- Coordinates: 39°50′32″N 82°48′18″W
- Area: less than one acre
- Built: 1902
- Architect: William Boyd
- Architectural style: Late 19th and 20th Century Revivals
- MPS: Canal Winchester MPS
- NRHP reference No.: 89001028
- Added to NRHP: August 15, 1989

The Times Building-Lodge Hall, at 19 E. Waterloo St. in Canal Winchester, Ohio, was built in 1902. It was listed on the National Register of Historic Places in 1989.

== History ==
It is a two-part commercial block building. In 1999, it was still the only three-story building in town.

It was the first building built for the Winchester Times newspaper, and it served the local Masonic and Eastern Star groups for more than 80 years.

The NRHP listing included two contributing buildings. The newspaper and Masonic Lodge partnered to construct the building for joint use. The newspaper had previously been located in three other building before constructing this building, where it remained until 1976. The building also housed the Franklin Telephone company, which brought the first telephone line to town in 1882.
