= Dr. James Merryman House =

Historic house in Ohio, United States

- U.S. National Register of Historic Places
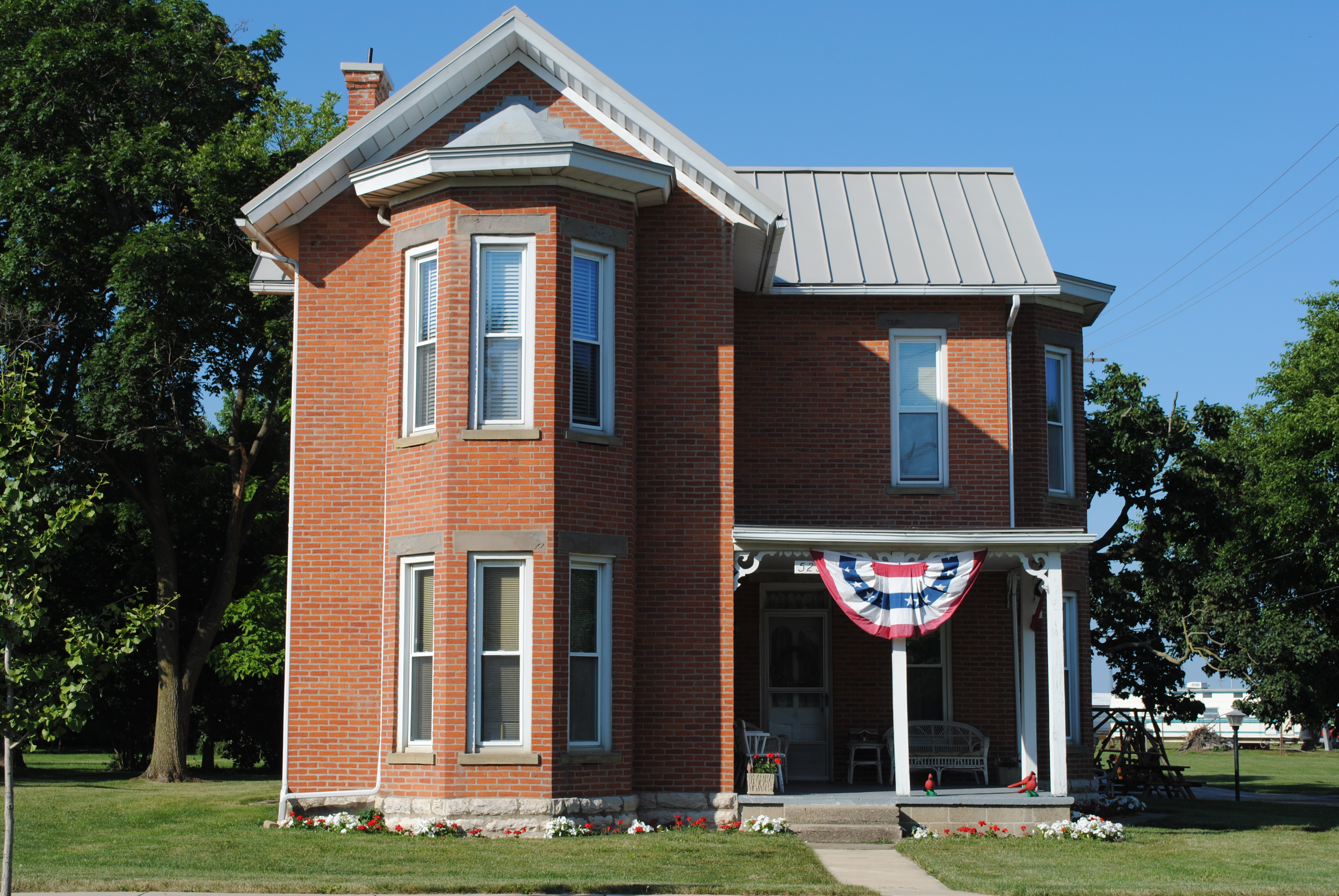

- Location within Ohio
- Location: 5232 Norwich St. Hilliard, Ohio
- Coordinates: 40°02′00″N 83°09′24″W
- Built: c. 1879
- Architectural style: Late Victorian, Italianate
- NRHP reference No.: 88000638
- Added to NRHP: May 26, 1988

Dr. James Merryman House is a T-plan historic farmhouse with Italianate features in Hilliard, Ohio. In Hilliard, it is the only house of its type and was built in 1879 for local doctor, James M. Merryman.

Dr. Merryman was a Civil War veteran who was incarcerated in the Andersonville Confederate prison. He later served on Ohio's 82nd General Assembly.

It was added to the National Register of Historic Places on May 26, 1988.
