= Kristen Clarke =

American lawyer (born 1975)

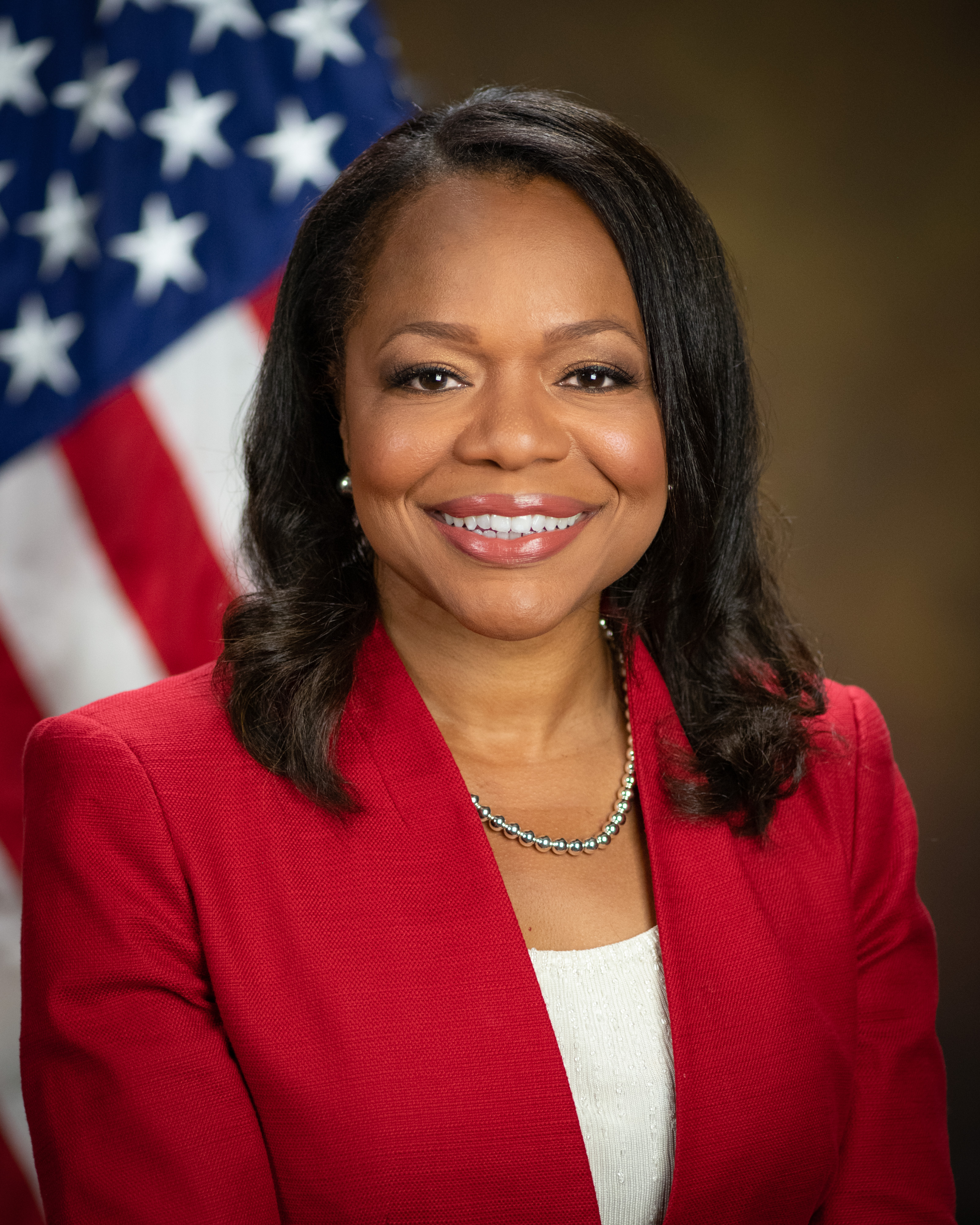
- Official portrait, 2021

United States Assistant Attorney General for the Civil Rights Division
- In office May 25, 2021 – January 20, 2025
- President: Joe Biden
- Preceded by: Eric Dreiband
- Succeeded by: Harmeet Dhillon

Personal details
- Born: 1975 (age 50–51)
- Education: Harvard University (BA); Columbia University (JD)

Kristen M. Clarke (born 1975) is an American attorney who served as the assistant attorney general for the Civil Rights Division at the United States Department of Justice from 2021 to 2025. Clarke previously served as president of the Lawyers' Committee for Civil Rights Under Law. She also managed the Civil Rights Bureau of the New York State Attorney General's Office under Eric Schneiderman.

In 2021, President-elect Joe Biden selected Clarke to head the U.S. Department of Justice Civil Rights Division. The U.S. Senate confirmed her nomination on May 25, 2021, by a vote of 51 to 48. Clarke made history as the first woman confirmed to lead the Civil Rights Division.

In March 2026, Clarke was appointed as general counsel of the National Association for the Advancement of Colored People (NAACP).

== Early life and education ==
Clarke's parents immigrated to Brooklyn from Jamaica. She has said that she "grew up in a household that was about discipline, working hard in school and about making the most of every opportunity". Clarke was a member of Prep for Prep, a non-profit organization that looks to support students of color in accessing private school education.

Clarke attended Choate Rosemary Hall, where she was the only girl to join the boys' wrestling squad.

She earned her Bachelor of Arts degree from Harvard University, where she was president of the Black Students Association. In 1996, only 11 percent of juniors and seniors at the college were black, while 25 percent of juniors and seniors living in Quad houses were black, according to a student-produced report.

Clarke graduated from Harvard in 1997, then earned a Juris Doctor from Columbia Law School in 2000. After graduating she worked as a trial attorney in the United States Department of Justice Civil Rights Division. In this capacity, she served as a federal prosecutor and worked on voting rights, hate crimes, and human trafficking cases.

== Legal career ==
In 2006, Clarke joined the NAACP Legal Defense and Educational Fund, where she co-led the political participation group and focused on voting rights and election law reform. In 2011, Clarke was appointed director of the civil rights bureau of then-Attorney General of New York Eric Schneiderman, where she led initiatives on criminal justice issues and housing discrimination. Under this initiative, the bureau reached agreements with retailers on racial profiling of their customers, police departments on policy reform, and with school districts on the school-to-prison pipeline.

In 2015, Clarke was appointed president and executive director of the Lawyers' Committee for Civil Rights Under Law. One of her first roles was leading Election Protection, a voter protection coalition. The New York Times described her as "one of the nation's foremost advocates for voting rights protections."

In 2019, Clarke represented Taylor Dumpson, the first African American woman student body president of American University, in her lawsuit against avowed neo-Nazi Andrew Anglin, who initiated a racist "troll storm" against her, making her fear for her life and disrupting her ability to pursue her education. Clarke successfully fought for the United States District Court for the District of Columbia to recognize that hateful online trolling can interfere with access to public accommodation, as well as securing damages and a restraining order.

In early 2020, Clarke said that she was "deeply concerned that African American communities are being hardest hit by the COVID-19 pandemic, and that racial bias may be impacting the access they receive to testing and healthcare." In the aftermath of the murder of George Floyd, Clarke described the pandemic, record rates of unemployment and racial injustice caused by police brutality as a "perfect storm" for social unrest in the United States.

In March 2026, Clarke was appointed as general counsel of the NAACP.

=== Voting rights ===
Clarke handled the legal argument in district court in Shelby County v. Holder. In 2020, she testified before Congress about barriers to the vote. She has advocated for passage of the John Lewis Voting Rights Advancement Act. She sued the United States Postal Service during the pandemic because of delays with ballots. After John Lewis died, she called for honoring his life by passage of a bill to restore the Voting Rights Act. She appears with Stacey Abrams in the 2020 documentary All In: The Fight for Democracy. In November 2020, LeBron James thanked her for supporting the work of his organization More Than a Vote.

=== LGBTQ rights ===
In 2015, Clarke opened an investigation into the Boy Scouts to look at the national group's ban on openly gay adults and alleged hiring rejections based on sexual orientation in New York. The investigation was about "ensuring equal protection under the law for all New Yorkers, including lesbian, gay, bisexual and transgender individuals who live and work in New York." In July 2015, her office secured an agreement with the Boy Scouts of America to end their policy of excluding openly gay adults from serving as leaders in the organization. The terms of the agreement applied nationally. In an editorial with Chad Griffin, she called for policymakers and the public to treat the recent wave of hate-motivated violence toward trans women of color as a national crisis.

=== Disability rights ===
Clarke secured agreements with bus companies, major retailers, movie theatres, theatre clubs, and polling sites.

=== Religious rights ===
Clarke secured settlements on religious rights. These agreements helped employees at NYC Health And Hospitals Corporation, the largest municipal healthcare organization in the country, by ensuring that employees' religious accommodations requests comply with state and local law and Title VII of the Civil Rights Act of 1964. She secured similar agreements with Milrose Consulting.

=== Immigration ===
She supported a legal effort behind Cesar Vargas who became the first illegal immigrant to carry a law license in New York. She successfully sued the Trump administration when it tried to revoke Deferred Enforced Departure for Liberian Americans.

=== Hurricane Katrina ===
In 2005, she co-edited Seeking Higher Ground: The Hurricane Katrina Crisis, Race, and Public Policy Reader with Manning Marable. The book examined the racial impact of the disaster and the failure of governmental, corporate and private agencies to respond to the plight of the New Orleans black community.

=== Hate speech ===
Clarke supported Facebook's extension of its ban on hate speech to prohibit the promotion and support of white nationalism and white separatism. Her advocacy led to a temporary shutdown of the Stormfront website, a white supremacist website. At a congressional hearing, she said white nationalism was about "real issues that are truly a life-and-death matter for far too many."

=== Hate crimes ===
Clarke sued the Proud Boys after they attacked the Metropolitan AME Church and other churches in Washington, D.C. A Black Lives Matter banner was stolen from the church and burned during a pro-Trump march on December 12, 2020. After the suit was filed, she said: "Black churches and other religious institutions have a long and ugly history of being targeted by white supremacists in racist and violent attacks meant to intimidate and create fear. Our lawsuit aims to hold those who engage in such action accountable." She leads the James Byrd Jr. Center to Stop Hate at the Lawyers' Committee for Civil Rights Under Law. Together with Spencer Freedman, she supervised the Religious Rights Unit at the New York State Attorney General's Office. She exposed a member of the Proud Boys inside the East Hampton Police Department in Connecticut. She has fought for passage of the federal Anti-Lynching Prevention Law. As a keynote speaker for Georgetown University's Center for Jewish Civilization, she said: "White nationalism should be of profound concern to all Americans because it affects all communities and tears at the fabric of our nation."

== Assistant Attorney General for Civil Rights Division of the Department of Justice ==
=== Nomination ===
On January 7, 2021, President-elect Joe Biden chose Clarke to head the U.S. Department of Justice Civil Rights Division. Clarke said in response, "If I am fortunate enough to be confirmed, we will turn the page on hate and close the door on discrimination by enforcing our federal civil rights laws."

Clarke's nomination was supported by law enforcement organizations, Jewish organizations such as the Anti-Defamation League, Justice Department alumni from Republican and Democratic administrations, Republican officials, dozens of managing partners of corporate law firms, General Counsels of Fortune 500 corporations, hate crime survivors, and others. She also had support from public figures such as Michael Bloomberg, Lilly Ledbetter and Michael Chertoff.

Four days later, Tucker Carlson and Fox News revealed a letter Clarke wrote to The Harvard Crimson as an undergraduate claiming that Blacks had "superior physical and mental abilities" due to their higher levels of melanin. Clarke said that the article was supposed to be a satirical statement about "fighting one ridiculous absurd racist theory with another ridiculous absurd theory." A fact-check by Newsweek quoted her article as saying it was "in response to those who defend The Bell Curve," however the fact-check concluded the article didn't state that it was not serious. Former presidents of Harvard's Black Students Association defended Clarke for considering Melanin theory worthy of inquiry. Former University of California Regent Ward Connerly publicly objected to Clarke's nomination.

The Jewish News Syndicate also noted Clarke's role as leader of Harvard's Black Student Association in 1994 in inviting antisemitic conspiracy theorist professor Tony Martin as a guest speaker on campus. Clarke characterized Martin as "an intelligent, well-versed black intellectual who bases his information of indisputable fact." On January 14, 2021, Clarke apologized for inviting Martin, saying, "Giving someone like him a platform, it's not something I would do again."

During her confirmation hearing, Attorney General Merrick Garland stated that Clarke's skills and experiences would help the Department of Justice combat discrimination "in areas from housing to education to employment" and "ensure accountability for law enforcement misconduct." During her confirmation hearing before the Senate Judiciary Committee, Clarke was criticized by Senators Ted Cruz and John Cornyn for her alleged writings in support of "Defunding the Police." Clarke responded by stating that she endorses attempts to increase police funding, but also wishes to see "more money for social services".

Clarke's nomination was stalled in the Senate Judiciary Committee by a vote of 11-11 after every GOP Senator on the committee voted against her nomination. On May 18, 2021, the Senate voted 50–48 to discharge her nomination from committee. She was then confirmed on May 25, 2021, by a vote of 51–48.

=== Tenure ===
On June 25, 2021, it was reported that Clarke would be joining Vanita Gupta in suing the State of Georgia over the Election Integrity Act of 2021 that the state passed into law.

In 2024, it was reported that Clarke was a victim and survivor of years-long domestic violence. Clarke disclosed that this period "was a terrorizing and traumatizing period". The period of domestic violence included a detention that was expunged. Republican members of the Senate Judiciary Committee asked Attorney General Merrick Garland to remove her from office.

== Awards and honors ==
- 2010 Columbia Law School Paul Robeson Distinguished Alumni Award
- 2010 National Black Law Students Association Alumni of the Year
- 2011 National Bar Association Top 40 Under 40
- 2012 National Association of Attorneys General Best Brief Award
- 2015 New York Law Journal Rising Stars
- 2017 Choate Rosemary Hall Alumni Award
- 2017 Quinnipiac University School of Law Thurgood Marshall Award
- 2018 Louis L. Redding Lifetime Achievement Award
- 2019 The Root Most Influential Americans

== Selected publications ==
- Marable, Manning; Clarke, Kristen (2009). Barack Obama and African American empowerment : the rise of Black America's new leadership (1st ed.). New York: Palgrave Macmillan. ISBN 978-0-230-10329-0. OCLC 608023888.
- Marable, Manning; Clarke, Kristen (2008). Seeking higher ground : the Hurricane Katrina crisis, race, and public policy reader. Palgrave Macmillan. ISBN 978-1-4039-8396-1. OCLC 129952587.
- Clarke, Kristen (2008). "Race-Ing the Post-Katrina Political Landscape: An Analysis of the 2006 New Orleans Election". Seeking Higher Ground. New York: Palgrave Macmillan US. pp. 33–37. doi:10.1057/9780230610095_3. ISBN 978-1-4039-7779-3.

== See also ==
- Joe Biden Supreme Court candidates
