= The Daily Stormer =

Defunct American neo-Nazi website

- Logo
- Website type: Neo-Nazi, alt-right commentary, message board
- Available in: English
- Dissolved: April 15, 2026
- Editor: Andrew Anglin
- Website: stormer5v52vjsw66jmds7ndeecudq444woadhzr2plxlaayexnh6eqd.onion ^{(Accessing link help)}
- Commercial: No
- Registration: Required to comment
- Launched: July 4, 2013; 13 years ago
- Current status: Defunct

The Daily Stormer was an American neo-Nazi commentary and message board website that advocated for a second genocide of Jews. It is part of the alt-right movement. Its editor, Andrew Anglin, founded the outlet on July 4, 2013, as a faster-paced replacement for his previous website Total Fascism, which had focused on his own long-form essays on fascism, race, and antisemitic conspiracy theories. In contrast, The Daily Stormer relied heavily on quoted material with exaggerated headlines.

The site is known for its use of Internet memes, which have been likened to the imageboard 4chan and cited as attractions for a younger and more ideologically diverse audience.

The Daily Stormer orchestrated what it calls the "Troll Army", which is involved in Internet trolling of figures with whom Anglin disagrees politically. In August 2017, after causing outrage by insulting the victim of a car-ramming homicide at the far-right Unite the Right rally, the website was rejected by several domain registrars. In August 2019, the site went offline temporarily when their service provider, BitMitigate, was cut off by their cloud infrastructure provider; the site found another provider.

In June 2019, a federal judge ordered Anglin to pay $4.1 million to comedian Dean Obeidallah, whom Anglin had falsely accused of orchestrating the Manchester Arena bombing. In August 2019, a federal judge ordered that Anglin pay $14 million to Tanya Gersh, a woman from Whitefish, Montana, against whom he had organized a targeted harassment campaign.

The Daily Stormer announced in March 2026 that the site would be closing.

== Management ==
=== Founder ===
Andrew Anglin was born in 1984, and grew up near Columbus, Ohio. According to both Anglin and his childhood classmates, he was liberal as a youth. He attended the Linworth Alternative Program and the Worthington Kilbourne High School from 1999 to 2003, where he was remembered as a dreadlocked vegan. His friends in high school report that his behavior changed during his sophomore year at Linworth, where he exhibited self-harming behavior, and began to promote conspiracy theories. After high school, Anglin took classes at Columbus State Community College in 2003, and studied English at Ohio State University for one semester in 2004.

In 2006, Anglin launched a conspiracy theory website, Outlaw Journalism, which was modeled after the works of Alex Jones and Hunter S. Thompson, whom Anglin admired.

In 2008, after posting on Outlaw Journalism that the only way for humanity to survive was to return to a hunter-gatherer lifestyle, Anglin began traveling around Southeast Asia, eventually ending up in Davao City, in the Philippines. In 2011, he spent several weeks with a Tboli village in southern Mindanao, where he initially intended to stay permanently, selling some of his possessions to raise money for a dowry to marry two local Muslim women. In 2012, Anglin wrote that he found the locals to be "a civilized, non-aggressive and industrious people" but he eventually came to consider them too "primitive", became lonely and only wanted to associate with members of his own race, and "By the Grace of God, I found Adolf Hitler."

In 2012, Anglin launched another website, Adventure Quest 2012, which discussed conspiracy theories such as the existence of reptilian humanoids. He described the aim of the site as seeking to "mend the wounds produced by modern society ... and [help] the reader transcend these physical bonds and reach total ascendancy. To mend these wounds, the world must learn to embrace diversity and color." In 2014, he stated that although he agreed with the central tenets of Nazism, he had reservations over reintroducing all aspects of Hitler's regime. A self-proclaimed "troll", Anglin stated that he was introduced to Nazism on the online imageboard 4chan. Later in 2012, he launched his first neo-Nazi website, Total Fascism. Feeling that Total Fascism was not appealing to a younger demographic and had articles that were too long, Anglin launched The Daily Stormer on July 4, 2013, with shorter articles and a more provocative style. Anglin said in March 2014 he spends 70 hours a week writing for the website.

Anglin's location is not known. An investigative article by The Huffington Post in November 2016 analyzed his social media and FBI sources, and concluded that he was living in Germany. Rumors have also claimed that he is residing in Russia. In July 2017, Anglin told CNN he was residing in Lagos, Nigeria. The Southern Poverty Law Center (SPLC) lists the site as being headquartered in Worthington, Ohio, with activity in several other states. The website is registered in the name of Anglin's father Greg, who runs a Christian-inspired counseling service in Worthington.

=== Finances ===
The Daily Stormer is primarily funded through donations which Anglin solicits regularly from site visitors. His father was protested against by Anti-Racist Action for receiving donations from the site's readers to pass on to his son. In February 2017, the website announced a corporate sponsor—Smerff Electrical, owned by Simon Hickey of Brisbane, Australia, whose website contains images of alt-right meme Pepe the Frog. Anglin told Mother Jones that he received donations from Silicon Valley, and that Santa Clara County, California was the largest source of traffic to his website.

The site is believed to have received over $200,000 in Bitcoin contributions since it began accepting the cryptocurrency in 2014. As of 2021, Anglin has received approximately $481,000 in Bitcoin. Money entering and being spent by the accounts was publicly tracked by a Twitter bot named 'Neonazi BTC Tracker', until 2020, when the account's final post was made. A Twitter account supportive of the Stormer announced that Coinbase was deleting accounts of persons attempting to send Bitcoin to them; Coinbase stated in general terms that it "prohibits use of an account which would abuse, harass, threaten, or promote violence against others". On August 20, 2017, for example, Anglin received a donation of 14.88 bitcoin, the number being a reference to Fourteen Words, and to Adolf Hitler (H is the eighth letter, so "88" = "HH" = "Heil Hitler"). At the time, it was worth $60,000, but had Anglin kept the entire amount, it would have been worth about $235,000 by the end of the year.

The Daily Stormer was run through a company called Moonbase Holdings, with Anglin saying that he chose the name so that donors could avoid scrutiny from their credit card companies. The company made $3,400 per month on the alt-right crowdfunding website Hatreon, which ceased operations in February 2017. In his defamation lawsuit against Anglin, Muslim American radio personality Dean Obeidallah requested that Moonbase Holdings be scrutinized to find any other individuals with connections to the company.

== Content and reception ==
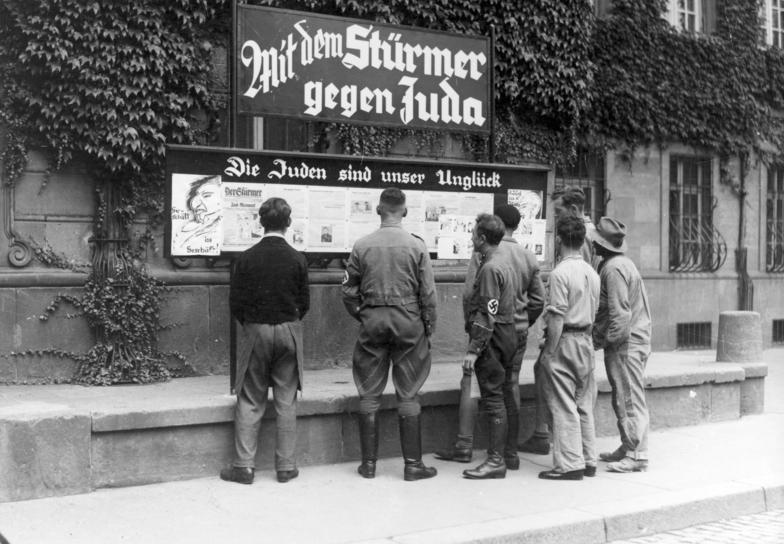
The Daily Stormer is named for the Nazi tabloid Der Stürmer, known for its antisemitic caricatures. This 1934 billboard for Der Stürmer reads "With Der Stürmer against Judea. The Jews are our misfortune".

The Daily Stormer takes its name from the Nazi Party's tabloid newspaper Der Stürmer, known for its virulently antisemitic caricatures of Jews and semi-pornography involving Jews raping young Aryan girls. Its publisher, Julius Streicher, was executed after the Second World War for crimes against humanity.

The Southern Poverty Law Center described the site as "the newest up and comer in the heated competition to rule the hate web", which "has in the last six months [up to March 2015] often topped the oldest and largest hate site on the web, Stormfront, in terms of reach and page views, based on Alexa data". Anglin claimed in May 2016 that the website's traffic had doubled over the last six months, peaking at 120,000 daily visitors. The website is part of the alt-right movement, and it calls itself "The World's Most Visited Alt-Right Website". As the movement made headlines in mid-2016, "bolstered in part by the unexpected rise of Donald Trump and Britain's decision to leave the European Union", Anglin declared: "We won the meme war; now we've taken over the GOP, and we did this very, very quickly." Unlike other figures such as Milo Yiannopoulos, Anglin does not play down the extremist elements in the alt-right, stating that: "The goal is to ethnically cleanse White nations of non-Whites and establish an authoritarian government. Many people also believe that the Jews should be exterminated".

Andrew Anglin used The Daily Stormer as a platform to promote misogynistic conspiracy theories, claiming that politically active "[w]hite women across the Western world" are pushing for liberal immigration policies "to ensure an endless supply of Black and Arab men to satisfy their depraved sexual desires." In July 2018, Anglin summarized his misogynistic views, writing: "Look, I hate women. I think they deserve to be beaten, raped and locked in cages."

=== Content and style ===
Anglin asserts that the purpose of The Daily Stormer was to provide "a means to propagandize people ... to get them to look at the world in a certain way". Headlines include "All Intelligent People in History Disliked Jews", and "Adolf Hitler: The Most Lied About Man of All Time". The site bills itself as "America's #1 Most-Trusted Republican News Source". According to The Jewish Chronicle, The Daily Stormer "posts hundreds of racist articles targeting black people, Arabs and Jews". The website offered pro-separatist coverage of the conflict in Eastern Ukraine, which Anglin considers "the correct moral position". The site promoted the conspiracy theory that Jews are shape shifting reptilians who rule the Earth, which Anglin had previously discussed on his web site Adventure Quest 2012.

The SPLC stated that The Daily Stormer owed its success to the online imageboard 4chan becoming popular among racists, as both websites use similar memes and rhetorical styles. One meme the website has used is to overlay photographs of Taylor Swift with antisemitic quotations, including comments made by Hitler. The website puts triple parentheses around the names of Jews, a far-right meme created by fellow website The Right Stuff. Jacob Siegel of The Daily Beast wrote that the website was growing in popularity amongst a younger audience due to its use of humor, and was attracting activists of other anti-political correctness ideologies—such as Gamergaters, men's rights activists and opponents of social justice warriors—who would not usually identify with fascism. The SPLC has also documented Anglin's involvement in and encouragement of culture jamming by making hyperbolic statements in fake online accounts as women and minorities. He has also said that "ridiculous" statements such as "gas the kikes", if repeated in media coverage, can work to desensitize the public to the Holocaust. He also believes that his extreme right-wing rhetoric can normalize less extreme right-wingers such as Trump. In December 2017, The Huffington Post leaked Anglin's 17-page style guide for the website, which included the guideline that articles must be so extremely hyperbolic that readers would be unsure whether the content is parody.

The hacker and Internet troll known as "weev" (Andrew Alan Escher Auernheimer) wrote an article on the website after his release from prison in October 2014, espousing his conversion to Neo-Nazism and his opposition to Jews who had built "an empire of wickedness the likes the world has never seen". Fredrick Brennan, founder of the online community 8chan, wrote an article on The Daily Stormer encouraging eugenics, based on his own experiences of having brittle bone disease.

Florida-based Jewish troll Joshua Ryne Goldberg, who encouraged a 2015 attack on a free speech exhibition in Garland, Texas, under the alias of a Muslim extremist, wrote white supremacist articles for The Daily Stormer under the pseudonym Michael Slay. In 2022, while serving time in American federal prison, Goldberg published an article on the self-publishing website Medium detailing how he became a writer for The Daily Stormer and mocking The Daily Stormer founder Andrew Anglin. In 2017, The Sydney Morning Herald journalist Luke McMahon – who had previously unmasked Goldberg – unmasked another Daily Stormer writer, Australia First Party member Nathan Sykes (who had penned articles for The Daily Stormer under the pseudonym "Hamish Patton"), revealing that he, too, was actually Jewish (although, in stark contrast to Goldberg, Sykes appeared to be fully sincere in the neo-Nazi views that he espoused online).

The Daily Stormer accepted freelance work and pays $14.88 (a reference to David Lane's Fourteen Words and the Nazi slogan "Heil Hitler") per article. The second-most prolific writer on the website goes by the pseudonym "Zeiger" and was unmasked in 2018 by the Montreal Gazette as Gabriel Sohier Chaput, an IT consultant from Rosemont–La Petite-Patrie, Quebec. Gabriel Sohier-Chaput was also a member of the now-defunct neo-Nazi online forum Iron March and was a supporter of the terrorist organization Atomwaffen Division writing articles promoting the group. In January 2023, Sohier-Chaput was found guilty of criminally promoting hatred against Jews as a result of an article he wrote for the site in 2017, and was sentenced to 15 months in prison.

Another notable prolific writer was Robert Warren "Azzmador" Ray, an East Texas-based neo-Nazi who gained national prominence from an appearance on a Vice News documentary by Elle Reeve about the Charlottesville riots where he complained that Charlottesville was run by "Jewish communists and criminal niggers". Ray is also the creator of The Krypto Report, the main podcast show of the Daily Stormer. A more recently-known associate/member of The Daily Stormer was Daniel Kenneth Jeffries from Granbury, Texas who goes by the nickname of "Grandpa Lampshade" (a reference to the World War II rumour that the Nazis made lampshades out of executed Holocaust prisoners) and hosts the "Thoughts on the Day" segment on the United Kingdom-based neo-Nazi radio network Radio Aryan founded by Steve "Sven Longshanks" Stone, Laurence "Max Musson" Nunn, and Jeremiah "Jez" Bedford-Turner of which the radio is prominently featured on The Daily Stormer. Some of Jeffries/Lampshade's posts were also shared by Robert Bowers, the Pittsburgh synagogue shooter and domestic terrorist.

The Daily Stormer attracted media coverage when the SPLC stated that white supremacist spree killer Dylann Roof—who on June 17, 2015, shot nine African Americans to death in the Charleston church shooting—may have made several comments on the site. The SPLC found similarities between one user's comments and Roof's manifesto. The Daily Beast stated that Anglin "repudiated Roof's crime and publicly disavowed violence, while endorsing many of Roof's views". In October of that year, Anglin gave a positive reaction to an attempted assassination on Henriette Reker, a pro-immigration candidate to be mayor of the German city of Cologne, decrying her as a "feminist hag".

In May 2017, "weev" set up the first non-English version of The Daily Stormer, El Daily Stormer in Spanish. It focused on news related to white nationalism in Spain and Latin America. El Daily Stormer was one of the sites where the identity of the victim of La Manada was spread. In December 2018, three admins of the site were arrested by the national police of Spain and a fourth member has been identified.

=== Support for Donald Trump ===
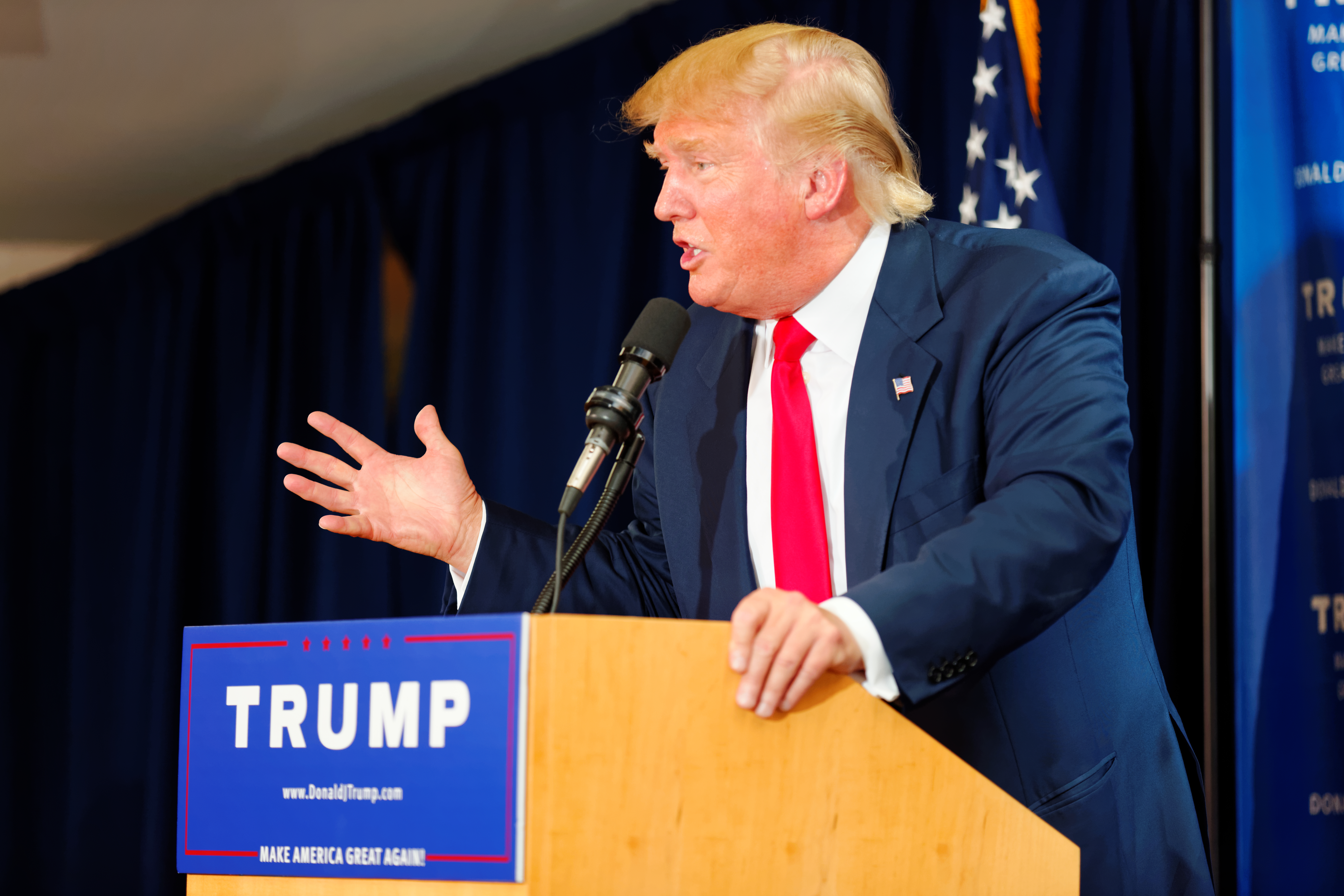
The Daily Stormer endorsed Donald Trump's presidential campaign in 2016.

Anglin officially endorsed Donald Trump for president in 2015. Anglin encouraged the website's readers to "vote for the first time in our lives for the one man who actually represents our interests". The website also received national and international coverage for its endorsement of Trump's proposal of a temporary moratorium on admitting foreign Muslims into the country; it proclaimed "Heil Donald Trump – The Ultimate Savior". According to the SPLC, white supremacist endorsement of Trump is unprecedented, as the movement is generally skeptical of all politicians. In July 2016, Andrew Anglin and The Daily Stormer were mentioned by Lacy Clay, Democratic Representative from Missouri, as he asked in a congressional hearing whether FBI director James Comey was aware of Trump sharing Twitter posts by white supremacists. Anglin wrote in July 2016 that he believed that Trump was a pragmatic anti-Semite who praised Israel to win votes from evangelical Christians, while dropping subtle hints about purported Jewish domination of rival Hillary Clinton's campaign. The Huffington Post journalist Jessica Schulberg compared how white nationalists like Anglin and former Ku Klux Klan leader David Duke believed Trump to be representative of their ethnic interests, while at the same time several Jews believed him to be representative of theirs.

In The Daily Telegraph, Trump supporter Crystal Wright wrote that the candidate needed to separate himself from white nationalists such as The Daily Stormer, who were endorsing him ahead of other politicians they deemed "cuckservatives" for holding more liberal positions. Writing for The Atlantic, Conor Friedersdorf theorized that modern academia's focus on race rather than "color-blind" individualism was causing divisions and allowing white nationalist sites such as The Daily Stormer to gain an audience, and therefore become a "tiny but nevertheless alarming portion" of Trump's support. Al Jazeera writer Malcolm Harris analyzed the endorsement and predicted that a Trump presidency would strengthen organized racist groups and lead to civil war.

After Trump won the 2016 U.S. presidential election, Anglin called on the site's readers to use non-violent intimidation to make "brown people" feel unwelcome in America, and to goad disappointed supporters of Clinton into committing suicide.

In response to the bombing of the Syrian government's Shayrat Airbase in 2017, The Daily Stormer was one of several alt-right outlets that criticized Trump. While Anglin alleged the president could be under control of a purportedly Jewish deep state, Daily Stormer associate "weev" said in a video on the website that he retained faith in Trump from his past actions.

=== Reaction from white nationalists ===
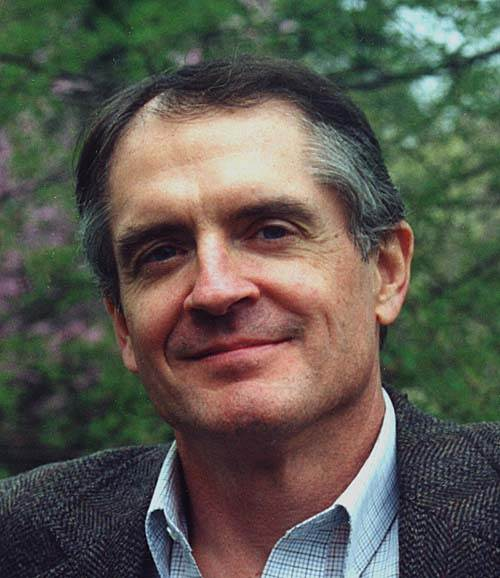
Jared Taylor criticized the tone of The Daily Stormer.

White nationalist websites such as Stormfront and Counter-Currents have taken issue with what they see as lowbrow coverage on The Daily Stormer, as well as Anglin's defense of Christianity and denunciation of the white supremacist ideology Christian Identity. Kyle Rogers of the Council of Conservative Citizens has also criticized the website for reprinting its material. Anglin has also been criticized for his relationships with Filipinas, and for his insults towards white women on his website.

Colin Liddell of AlternativeRight.com has criticized Anglin's beliefs and tone. Liddell, who believes that stopping migration and encouraging higher birthrates is more important for preserving the white race, condemned Anglin for writing that it was impossible for the race to survive without adopting his views on Jews, Hitler and the Holocaust. Liddell considered that Anglin was attracting poor whites with his provocative online persona in the same manner as monster trucks and professional wrestling, writing that "it is hard not to conclude that Anglin is a paid shill and agent provocateur, whose purpose is simply to infest and discredit White nationalism". Jared Taylor of American Renaissance criticized The Daily Stormer's "extremely harsh, dismissive and insulting tone toward blacks", which he called unhelpful.

Others, such as the Traditionalist Youth Network, have praised The Daily Stormer for its reach and influence. Anglin's extreme tone has led some white nationalists to suspect that he is an undercover Jew, an accusation he finds analogous to believing that Jewish LGBT activist Allen Ginsberg was an undercover Nazi.

=== Support for China ===
According to Foreign Policy magazine, Anglin's Daily Stormer articles had regularly praised China for its actions against Uighur Muslims. It was reported in the same article that Anglin believed Chinese people had more freedom of speech and suggested Chinese occupation would be a welcome change from "Jewish Rule" in the West.

=== 2022 Buffalo shooting ===
Payton S. Gendron, the suspect in the 2022 mass shooting in Buffalo, New York, cited The Daily Stormer as having inspired the attack, in addition to 4chan and the writings of New Zealand mass shooter Brenton Tarrant.

== Activities ==
=== Harassment by the "Troll Army" ===
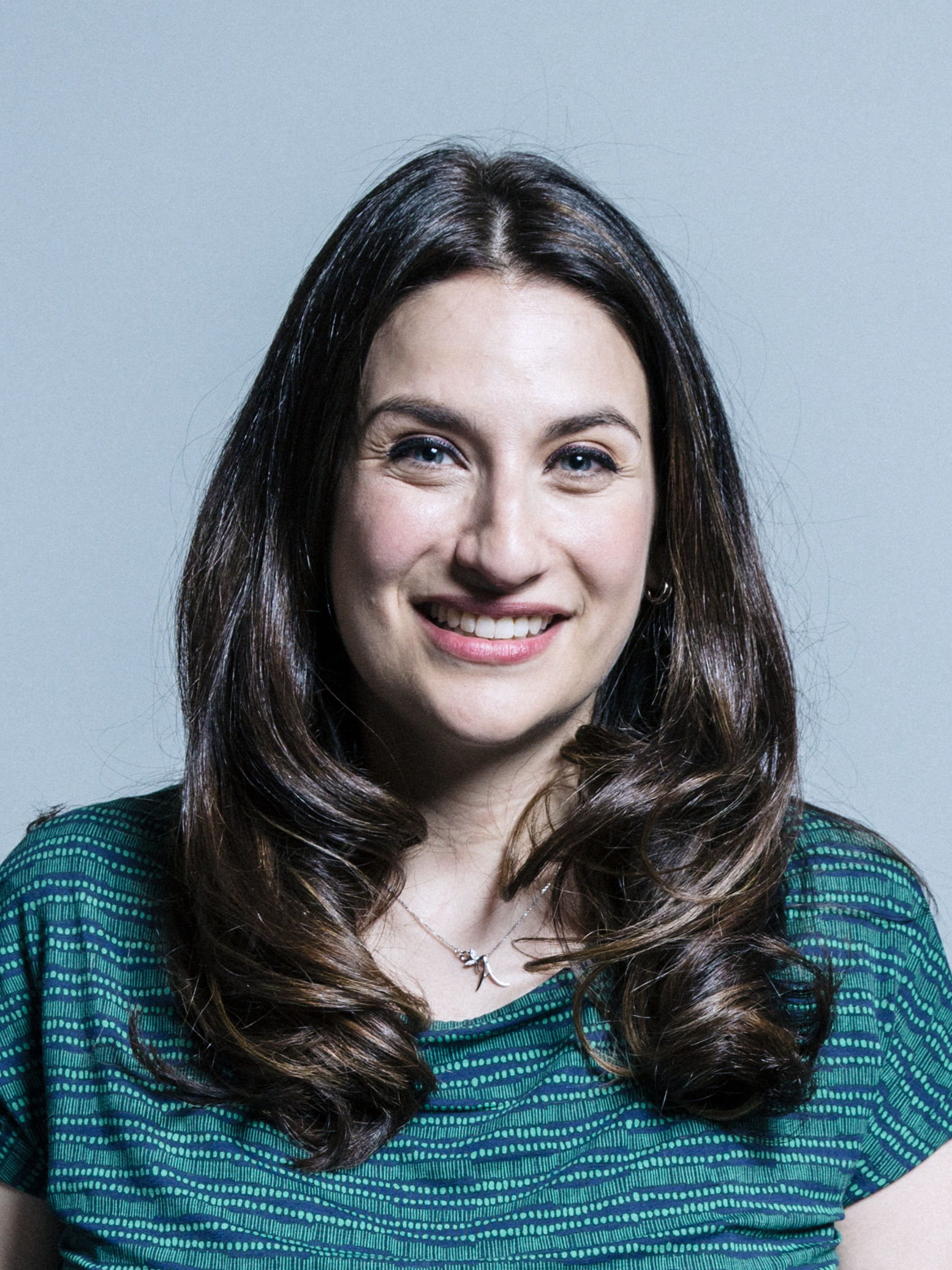
Luciana Berger, a British politician, was targeted by The Daily Stormer through a trolling campaign.

==== Luciana Berger ====
The Daily Stormer orchestrated what it calls a "Troll Army", involved in Internet trolling. It came to attention in October 2014 in a campaign against British Labour politician Luciana Berger, a Jewish Member of Parliament. A member of neo-Nazi group National Action had been sent to prison for sending her abusive messages over Twitter, and The Daily Stormer encouraged its readers to send her antisemitic messages, as long as they did not promote violence. It also gave out guidelines on how to limit traceability and create anonymous e-mail and Twitter accounts. Berger said she received 400 abusive messages in one week. The abuse was brought up in the British Parliament, where Speaker John Bercow deemed it "beneath contempt".

==== Mariam Veiszadeh ====
The "Troll Army" launched a campaign in February 2015 against Mariam Veiszadeh, an Afghan Australian Muslim activist who demanded that a T-shirt bearing the Australian flag reading "If you don't love it, leave" be withdrawn from sale at Woolworths. A woman was arrested for sending her abusive messages, and Anglin interpreted Veiszadeh's actions as curbing freedom of speech, which he believed "should be responded to with the most ridiculous conceivable hateful speech".

==== Alex Jones and Breitbart ====
The "Troll Army" has also attacked right-wing conspiracy theorist Alex Jones for having a Jewish wife. In November 2015, they took part in "Operation: Kikebart", targeting far-right news website Breitbart News for opening an office in Israel. The aim was to post so much anti-Semitic content in the comments section that it would be unfeasible to moderate. Disqus, the comment platform used by websites including Breitbart, ended its service to The Daily Stormer as a result.

==== Alison Rapp ====
In 2016, The Daily Stormer took part in a Gamergate-related attempt to have Nintendo marketing officer Alison Rapp fired; Nintendo dismissed her and stated that it was unrelated to the controversy.

==== Julia Ioffe ====
Later in 2016, the site encouraged racially abusing Julia Ioffe, a Russian-Jewish journalist who had written a piece on Trump's wife, Melania Trump, in GQ magazine. Ioffe said that the abuse was unparalleled in her lifetime since leaving Russia to escape such prejudices 26 years earlier.

==== Erin Schrode ====
In June 2016, users of the website revealed the personal details of Erin Schrode, a Jewish woman running for Congress in California, and sent her Holocaust-related messages.

==== Tanya Gersh ====
The Southern Poverty Law Center filed a lawsuit in April 2017 on behalf of Montana Jewish resident Tanya Gersh, against Anglin and The Daily Stormer, alleging they had invaded her privacy and caused "intentional infliction of emotional distress" upon Gersh, and also violated Montana's Anti-Intimidation Act. The website initiated a "troll storm" in response to Gersh's alleged extortion of property belonging to the mother of white nationalist Richard B. Spencer. Gersh denies the allegations. The site crowdfunded $152,000 in legal fees from around 2,000 contributors and hired First Amendment lawyer Marc Randazza, whose previous clients include 8chan and right-wing author Mike Cernovich. The suit ran into difficulties because of Anglin's secrecy over his location. In November, a federal judge ruled that Gersh was not a public figure, that Anglin had intentionally incited his readers to harass Gersh, and that such harassment was not protected as free speech. Gersh testified in the lawsuit, as did her therapist, to describe the effects on her of the continued harassment of the "troll army". Anglin did not appear at a hearing, despite being ordered to do so by the trial judge, saying that he feared for his safety; he is presumed to be outside of the United States. By not appearing, he forfeited his legal right to defend his actions.

On July 15, 2019, the federal magistrate overseeing the trial recommended that Gersh receive a default judgment of $14 million, $4 million in compensatory damages, and $10 million in punitive damages. The magistrate also recommended that Anglin be forced to remove the posts encouraging the harassment of Gersh from The Daily Stormer website. On August 8, the magistrate's recommendations were approved by a U.S. District Court judge. David Dinielli, the deputy legal director of the SPLC, said that the organization would "go to the ends of the earth to collect the judgment on behalf of our client, Tanya Gersh, whether it's cash, assets or intellectual property. ... We will employ various procedures to obtain any assets that can be seized, if Anglin does not pay the full $14 million judgment. And if his monetary and other hard assets are insufficient, we will go after his intangible property." According to Anglin's lawyer at the time, who no longer represents him, Anglin is not currently a U.S. resident.

==== Dean Obeidallah ====
In August 2017, Muslim American radio presenter Dean Obeidallah sued The Daily Stormer in an Ohio federal court. Anglin had published fake images which purported to show Obeidallah celebrating the 2017 Manchester Arena bombing. The lawsuits cleared a longstanding hurdle in March 2018, when U.S. Magistrate Judge Jeremiah Lynch declared that there was sufficient evidence of Anglin being domiciled in Ohio despite living abroad. In July, the court found in Obeidallah's favor, with neither Anglin nor his representatives present in court.

==== Taylor Dumpson ====
Taylor Dumpson, the first black student body president at American University, sued Anglin in May 2018 for organizing a racist and sexist trolling campaign against her. She alleges that Anglin had posted her name and picture, as well as links to her Facebook page and the Twitter account of the university's student government, and urged his readers to "troll storm" her, which resulted in many hate-filled and racist online messages directed at her. Although Dumpson and Anglin have not reached a settlement, she settled in December 2018 with one of the people who harassed her, a man from Eugene, Oregon named Evan McCarty who was a neo-Nazi musician and former theatre actor known as "Byron de la Vandal" (named after Byron De La Beckwith, the assassin of Medgar Evers) who served as a member of the fascist Vanguard America and affiliated with the Daily Stormer. McCarty was required to apologize, to renounce white supremacy, to stop trolling and doxing online, and to provide information to and cooperate with authorities in the prosecution of white supremacists. The lawsuit that was brought on her behalf was led by the Lawyers' Committee for Civil Rights Under Law which continues to use litigation as a tool to fight extremism and to slow the efforts of white supremacists.

On August 9, 2019, a Federal judge awarded Dumpson a judgment of over $725,000, to be paid by Andrew Anglin, Brian Andrew Ade, and the shell company which owns The Daily Stormer. The defendants did not show up to contest the lawsuit, so a default judgment was entered against them, consisting of $101,429.28 in compensatory damages, punitive damages of $500,000 and attorney's fees and costs of $124,022.10. A restraining order was also handed down, as was an injunction not to publish anything more about Dumpson. The judgement came only a day after Tanya Gersh was awarded a $14 million default judgment against Anglin.

=== Distribution of propaganda ===
In 2016, The Daily Stormer and the hacker "weev" jointly took credit for sending copies of a racist, anti-Semitic flier to thousands of publicly accessible, Internet-connected printers throughout the United States, many of them at universities. The flier urged the reader to visit the website and accompany it "in the struggle for global white supremacy". Anglin credited "weev" for the printer exploit, while one of The Daily Stormer crew composed the flier's text. On April 20 that year, the anniversary of Adolf Hitler's birth, university printers in Germany were hacked to publish Nazi propaganda tracts including the website's name. That same year, The Daily Stormer expanded its activities to establish 31 "clubs".

The Daily Stormer capitalized on the popularity of the augmented reality video game Pokémon Go in mid-2016 to distribute racist flyers to children congregating in public to play the game, with Anglin explaining that "I have long thought that we needed to get pre-teens involved in the movement. At that age, you can really brainwash someone easily. Anyone who accepts Nazism at the age of 10 or 11 is going to be a Nazi for life." On May 3, 2017, one day after a deadly stabbing attack at the University of Texas, racist flyers were posted across campus with the website address for The Daily Stormer, a caricature of a black person, and the line "... around blacks ... never relax!".

== Site hosting issues after the 2017 Unite the Right rally ==
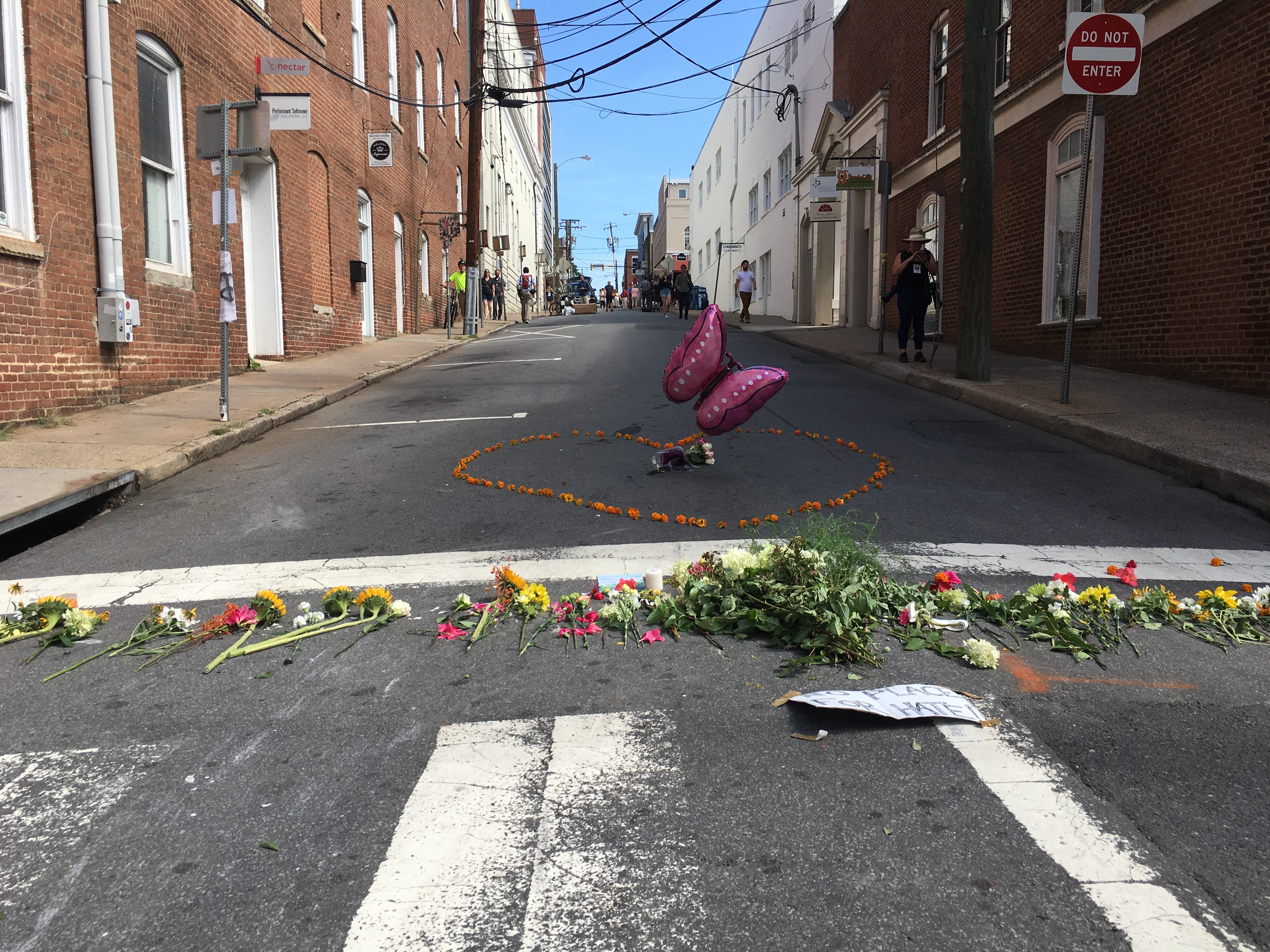
Memorial for Heather Heyer at the site of her death during the Unite the Right rally. Anglin's mocking of her death led to The Daily Stormer being removed by several domain registrars.

The Daily Stormer promoted readers' participation in the Unite the Right rally, a far-right rally in Charlottesville, Virginia on August 11 and 12, 2017, in which a counter-protester, Heather Heyer, was killed in a vehicular ramming attack. "Weev" called for readers of The Daily Stormer to locate and attend Heyer's funeral, calling her a "fat skank". Both Anglin and "weev" denied that Heyer died from vehicular impact, claiming instead that she was killed by a weight-related heart attack.

On August 13, the website was informed by its domain registrar GoDaddy that it had violated the terms of service by mocking Heyer in an article by Anglin. He was given 24 hours to locate a new registrar for the site. The next day it moved to Google which almost immediately cancelled its registration for violation of terms, also terminating the website's YouTube account. The following day, the website registered with Tucows, who canceled it hours later for regularly inciting violence. On August 15, it was announced by "weev" that the site had moved to the dark web, and that it was now only accessible via Tor, while Facebook banned links to the site and Discord banned its server. On August 16, Cloudflare, the DNS provider and proxy service used to protect The Daily Stormer, also terminated their service. Cloudflare had previously refused to terminate sites based on their content, but CEO Matthew Prince made an exception, posting a public announcement and explanation on the company's blog. The Daily Stormer now receives DDoS protection from a content distribution network set up in March 2017, BitMitigate. The company's founder, Nick Lim, said that he found The Daily Stormer to be "stupid" but believed in freedom of expression. Several Twitter accounts connected with The Daily Stormer were also suspended.

On August 17, after a relocation to dailystormer.ru, the Russian media watchdog Roskomnadzor requested a shutdown of the domain. The Daily Stormer briefly returned to the clearnet with a .lol gTLD, dailystormer.lol, administered by Namecheap, but after two days, Namecheap canceled the domain. The company's CEO Richard Kirkendall stated that "the quality and context of the material, paired with the support for violent groups and causes passes from protected free speech into incitement", specifically quoting one published statement from The Daily Stormer: "It doesn't take a Ph.D. in mathematics to understand that White men + pride + organization = Jews being stuffed into ovens."

The site returned to the web as punishedstormer.com on August 24, hosted by DreamHost, whose other clients include the far-right National Vanguard and the Northwest Front. Denial-of-service attacks from Anonymous caused intermittent outages for all of DreamHost's sites, including those unconnected to white supremacist ideology. Within hours of the attack, DreamHost canceled the site's accounts for violating its terms of service, saying the host had already been kicked off the site years previously and was exploiting an automated sign-up process. Days later, The Daily Stormer was available under an Albanian .al ccTLD, dailystormer.al. Within four days, it was removed by registrar Host.al for breaking their content rules. In September, The Daily Stormer was briefly registered with a .at address from Austria, but this was removed by registrar nic.at when local politicians complained. Later that month, it reappeared on a .is domain from Iceland, a country known for its freedom of speech; Anglin said that the recent collapse of the Nordic island's government meant that politicians would be distracted from affairs related to his website. Before the end of September, ISNIC pulled The Daily Stormer because Anglin refused its standard condition of disclosing his address, fearing that the information would be passed to law agencies. From September 21 to October 6, The Daily Stormer was hosted on a .cat domain, exclusively reserved for websites promoting Catalan language and culture. It exploited weakened filters after the Spanish government raided the offices of registrar Fundació puntCAT amidst a political crisis, and published several pieces in support of Catalan independence. In November 2017, The Daily Stormer was registered with a .hk domain from Hong Kong, which was revoked before the end of the month.

On November 29, 2017, the site returned to the clear web yet again with a new .red domain name, registered through GKG.net. The domain kept the website online until it was seized by the registrar. Hours after the domain was seized, the site was registered on a new .top website, through the same registrar they had previously used for .red. The .top domain lasted just until February 2, 2018, when it was taken offline by the registrar. In February 2018, The Daily Stormer registered a new domain under the .name TLD with the China-based Internet company Eranet International Limited.

The Daily Stormer announced the site would be closing in March 2026. MS Now reported that Andrew Anglin wrote on March 12, "This is the way of things. The world goes to war. The Daily Stormer shuts down."

=== Reaction ===
The domain blocking by Internet providers has raised questions regarding the implications of domain registrants policing the Internet. The August 21, 2017 cancellation of The Rebel Media's registration on 24 hours' notice was compared to that of The Daily Stormer, as both had provided coverage sympathetic to Charlottesville protesters.

The Electronic Frontier Foundation acknowledged that the companies were within their legal rights to terminate their contracts with The Daily Stormer, but said that the move set a dangerous precedent in which other political views, including left-wing ones, could be denied legal protection. Several news outlets also published editorials discussing the free speech implications of the move.

When The Daily Stormer returned to the dark web on the Tor network as of August 17, 2017, the Tor project team announced that they were "disgusted" by the website, but that they were powerless to intervene.
