= Antisemitism on Reddit =

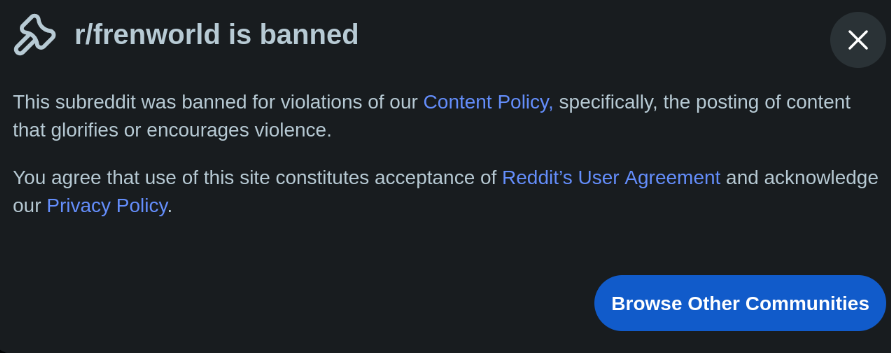
The subreddit r/frenworld was removed by Reddit in 2019 after hosting antisemitic content.

The social media site Reddit has repeatedly hosted antisemitic content. Both the company and users have responded by raising awareness of and removing offending subreddits, as well as improving internal processes. In multiple cases, steps were only taken after strong external pressure by organizations such as the Anti-Defamation League and the Southern Poverty Law Center. Occasionally, anti-Zionist content has been accused of crossing into anti-Semitic rhetoric.

== History ==
In response to a campaign that included the Southern Poverty Law Center, Reddit removed multiple subreddits for spreading antisemitism in 2015, after a containment measure referred to as "quarantining" did not yield sufficient results. A decision to remove an antisemitic subreddit a few weeks before was characterized by neo-Nazi Andrew Anglin as "the beginning of the end of one of the very last remaining free speech outlets on the internet." The Forward described repeated antisemitism throughout alt-right subreddits in the aftermath of the first Trump victory. Multiple controversial subreddits were quarantined in 2018, including r/whitenationalism and r/fragilejewishredditor.

In 2019, the subreddit r/frenworld was removed by Reddit for "glorifying or encouraging violence", after being active for 9 months and having more than 60.000 members. Concerns about the subreddit had been raised by other Reddit users in the months before the removal, but no action had been taken. During the GameStop short squeeze, Reddit users were accused spreading antisemitic statements and memes, often about Jewish control of the banks and media.

In the same year, the r/Kanye subreddit was temporarily filled with content educating its readers about the Holocaust, after the rapper Kanye West made antisemitic comments. After concerns by multiple moderators of Jewish communities, Reddit worked with the Anti-Defamation League to improve their processes. Changes include additional training and closer cooperation with the Jewish community.

== Analysis ==
A report by the Institute for Strategic Dialogue found that despite rates of Holocaust denial remaining relatively consistent between 2018 and 2020, steps had been taken by paid staff and volunteers to remove users and subreddits engaged in holocaust denial. In June 2020, "content that promotes hate "based on identity or vulnerability" was prohibited. An analysis by the ADL found in 2022 that antisemitic content is rewarded less than non-antisemitic content.
