= Tony Martin (professor) =

Trinidad-born professor of Africana Studies (1942–2013)

- Martin (from a book cover)
- Born: Anthony Martin; 21 February 1942; Port of Spain, Colony of Trinidad and Tobago
- Died: 17 January 2013 (aged 70); Cocorite, Diego Martin, Trinidad and Tobago
- Education: Gray's Inn; University of Hull; Michigan State University
- Occupations: Academic, professor
- Known for: Activism, black nationalism, Pan-Africanism
- Relatives: Audrey Jeffers (aunt), Henry Martin (brother)
- Website: www.professortonymartin.com

Tony Martin (21 February 1942 – 17 January 2013) was a Trinidad and Tobago-born scholar of Africana Studies. From 1973 to 2007 he worked at Wellesley College in Wellesley, Massachusetts, and over the course of his career published more than ten books and a range of scholarly articles.

Born in Port of Spain, Trinidad and Tobago, Martin moved to the United Kingdom, where he studied law at Gray's Inn, London, and then economics at the University of Hull. Relocating to the United States, he completed a PhD on the Jamaican political activist Marcus Garvey at Michigan State University in 1973. That year, he was employed as an associate professor at Wellesley College, where he was a founding member of its Africana Studies Department. During the latter part of the 1970s and 1980s he published several books on Garvey and Garveyism. In 1987 he sued his employer for racial discrimination and in 1991 was accused of harassing female students, although he denied the allegation.

Among the subjects that Martin pursued was the place of Jews in the Atlantic slave trade. During the 1990s, he came under public criticism for encouraging his students to read The Secret Relationship Between Blacks and Jews, a book compiled by the Nation of Islam that was widely regarded as antisemitic. That decade, he also entered into a publicized argument with Classics scholar Mary Lefkowitz, a prominent critic of historical claims made by Afrocentric scholarship. Martin subsequently took Lefkowitz to court for libel, but the case was dismissed. In 1993 he self-published The Jewish Onslaught, a book that Wellesley distanced themselves from and which generated further accusations of antisemitism. In 2002 he spoke at a conference organized by a leading Holocaust denial organization, the Institute for Historical Review (IHR), alleging that Jewish organizations were trying to stifle free speech. Martin retired from Wellesley in 2007.

== Life and academic credentials ==
Born Anthony Martin in Port of Spain, Trinidad and Tobago, he attended Tranquillity School, where he was a contemporary of Stokely Carmichael. After secondary school, Martin went to England to study law at Gray's Inn, London, where he was called to the Bar in 1966.

Martin subsequently received a B.Sc. honours degree in economics at the University of Hull (1968). He taught briefly in Trinidad at Cipriani Labour College and St. Mary's College, before moving to the United States in 1969 to pursue graduate studies in African History at Michigan State University, earning an M.A. and completing his Ph.D. in 1973. His doctoral dissertation, on Marcus Garvey and the UNIA, would be the basis for the book he later published as Race First: The Ideological and Organizational Struggles of Marcus Garvey and the Universal Negro Improvement Association.

Martin was founder and chair of the Africana Studies Department at Wellesley College, where he began teaching in 1973, became tenured in 1975, and became a full professor in 1979. He also taught at the University of Michigan-Flint and was a visiting professor at the University of Minnesota, Brandeis University, Brown University, and Colorado College, and also spent a year as an honorary research fellow at the University of the West Indies, Trinidad. In November 1994 he spoke at Harvard University at the invitation of the Black Students Association and praised its president Kristen Clarke for her courage in inviting him.

Martin was a prolific author of scholarly articles on many aspects of Black History and lectured all over the world. He received awards and honours from the American Philosophical Society, the Association for the Study of Classical African Civilizations and many others.

In 1983, Martin founded The Majority Press, a publishing company that produced many of his own books, as well as work by other authors.

Martin wrote, compiled or edited 14 published titles, including Caribbean History: From Pre-Colonial Origins to the Present (2012) and Amy Ashwood Garvey: Pan-Africanist, Feminist and Mrs. Marcus Garvey No. 1, Or, A Tale of Two Amies (2007). He had been working on two further biographies of Trinidadian women, of Audrey Jeffers (who was his aunt) and Kathleen Davis (also known as “Aunty Kay”).

Martin died unexpectedly on 17 January 2013, aged 70, at Westshore Medical Hospital, Cocorite, Trinidad and Tobago. His funeral service was held on 25 January.

== Research ==
=== Marcus Garvey ===
Martin was a prolific Garvey scholar – he was considered by some "the world's foremost authority on Marcus Garvey" – one of his earliest works being Race First: The Ideological and Organizational Struggles of Marcus Garvey and the Universal Negro Improvement Association, published in 1976.

He wrote a number of other books about Garvey, including Marcus Garvey, Hero: A First Biography (1983), African Fundamentalism: A Literary and Cultural Anthology of Garvey's Harlem Renaissance (1991), Literary Garveyism: Garvey, Black Arts and the Harlem Renaissance (1983), The Poetical Works of Marcus Garvey (1983), and The Pan-African Connection: From Slavery to Garvey and Beyond (1984).

He co-authored, with Wendy Ball, Rare Afro-Americana: A Reconstruction of the Adger Library (1981).

== Controversies ==
=== Harassment of students ===
In October 1991, a Wellesley student, Michelle Plantec, while on hall duty, claimed that she saw Martin wandering in a female dorm in a restricted area, in violation of a rule requiring male guests to be escorted. When she asked him about his escort, Martin, she claims, responded using profanity, accused her of racism and bigotry, and positioned himself so as to physically intimidate her. Martin denied all these claims, and declared that a group of women "accosted him rudely, despite circumstances that in his view made the legitimacy of his presence obvious."

In an interview with a campus newspaper, Plantec said: "I stopped him and said, 'Excuse me, sir, who are you with?' He looked at me and said, 'What do you mean?' I said, 'What Wellesley student are you with?' and at that point he exploded and called me a fucking bitch, a racist, and a bigot, among other things...after all this, he went back into his meeting and said the only reason I had stopped him was because he was black."

Martin, in the same interview, agreed that there was an angry exchange, but denied that he used profanity. He also said he asked permission from the dormitory desk before going to the restroom. "Coming out of the restroom, I was rudely accosted by a group of women who were coming up the stairs behind me...I tried to ignore them for a short space of time...and eventually, when we got to the top of the stairs I became very annoyed, and expressed my annoyance to the people who were behind me."

=== Lefkowitz controversy, Wellesley course controversy, and lawsuit ===
Mary Lefkowitz was a classics professor at Wellesley, who taught courses on ancient Greek culture. In a 1992 article for The New Republic, she challenged what she felt were ahistorical Afrocentric claims, such as the claim that Greek philosophy was plagiarized from African sources. Following publication of the New Republic piece, she and Martin became engaged in a heated disagreement, with Martin criticizing her in his department's Africana Studies Newsletter, and she criticizing him in The Wall Street Journal, the Chronicle of Higher Education, The New Republic, and elsewhere.

As this controversy progressed, Lefkowitz discovered that students in Martin's class were assigned a book called The Secret Relationship Between Blacks and Jews, compiled by the Historical Research Department of the Nation of Islam. The book's thesis is that Jews had a disproportionately large role in the black slave trade relative to their numbers. This thesis has since been refuted by mainstream historians, including the American Historical Association (AHA). Lefkowitz ignited a controversy over the book's inclusion on the curriculum, and the controversy made national headlines in the spring of 1993. NPR, The New York Times, The Boston Globe, and the Associated Press, among others, covered the story.

In Martin's view,

In January 1993, I was minding my own business and teaching my Wellesley College survey course on African American History when a funny thing happened. The long arm of Jewish intolerance reached into my classroom. Unknown to me, three student officers of the Jewish Hillel organization (campus B'nai B'rith stablemates of the Anti-Defamation League), sat in on my class and remained for a single period only. Their purpose was to monitor my presentation. As one of them explained in a campus meeting later, Jewish students had noticed The Secret Relationship Between Blacks and Jews among my offerings in the school bookstore. The book documents the considerable Jewish involvement in the Transatlantic African Slave Trade, the dissemination of which knowledge they, as Jews, considered an "anti-Semitic" and most "hateful" act.

One of Lefkowitz's responses to this controversy was an article in the September/October 1993 issue of Measure, the journal of the University Centers for Rational Alternatives in Columbia University. In this article, Lefkowitz made several allegations that Martin deemed libellous. For instance, she alleged that during the October 1991 incident discussed above, Martin had called a student "a white, fucking bitch" and that "the young woman fell down as a result of his onslaught, and Martin bent over to continue his rage at her." Martin initiated a libel suit. Martin had already sued several undergraduates for libel, as well as Wellesley College itself. The dean of Wellesley College, Nancy Kolodny, declined to pay Lefkowitz's court costs, reportedly saying to Lefkowitz: "It's your problem. The college can't help you." In the end, the Anti-Defamation League provided for Lefkowitz's defense. Three other national Jewish organizations, the American Jewish Committee, the American Jewish Congress and the Jewish Council for Public Affairs, provided assistance. The case went through six years of appeals and counter-appeals, and was finally dismissed.

As the campus controversy wound down, Martin published a book telling his side of the story: The Jewish Onslaught: Despatches from the Wellesley Battlefront (1993). (See section below.) Lefkowitz published her own views three years later in the book Not Out of Africa (Basic Books, 1996). In 2008 she published another book, History Lesson: A Race Odyssey, giving her version of the story of the lawsuit and the controversy with Martin.

=== Libel lawsuit against Counterpoint ===
In the wake of the 1993 controversy, Counterpoint, a joint MIT-Wellesley student publication, asked MIT student Avik Roy to write a "retrospective chronicling the controversy surrounding Martin since his arrival as associate professor in 1973." According to Roy, he was asked to write the article because the staff felt he would be less biased than a Wellesley student. The article by Roy was published in the fall 1993 issue of Counterpoint. It alleged that Martin "gained tenure within the Africana Studies department only after successfully suing the college for racial discrimination," and that this explained a reluctance on the part of the college to censure Martin. Martin sued Roy for libel. Roy refused to disclose the confidential sources of his information even after the case was brought to court. A Massachusetts Superior Court Judge found that a lawsuit by Martin against Wellesley had in fact occurred, but "well after his tenure, and thus could not have caused it." The suit in question was filed in 1987 and alleged racial discrimination over a merit increase. However, the 1991 libel suit was eventually dismissed, with the judge ruling that Martin did not meet his burden of proof on four out of five necessary components for proving libel. The judge found that the offending statement was "partly false, but substantially true," though inaccurate in its "implication of timing and causation." The judge agreed that Roy's conclusion, that fear of litigation would cause Wellesley to exercise "particular restraint" when dealing with Martin, "follows at least as strongly from the actual facts as it would from the erroneous version."

=== The Jewish Onslaught ===
In 1993, Martin published The Jewish Onslaught: Dispatches from the Wellesley Battlefront. A week after the book's publication, it was criticized in a statement by the president of Wellesley College, who stated that it "gratuitously attacks individuals and groups at Wellesley College through innuendo and the application of racial and religious stereotype", and the majority of the Wellesley faculty signed a statement condemning Martin's work "for its racial and ethnic stereotyping and for its anti-Semitism." The Chair of Martin's department at Wellesley, Selwyn Cudjoe, labelled Martin's book "Gangsta history, meant to demean and to defame others and to bring them into disrepute, rather than to enlighten and to lead us to a more complex and sophisticated understanding of social phenomena. It ought to be labeled anti-Semitic." The book was praised by Molefi Asante of Temple University, who called it the best polemic by an African since David Walker's 1829 classic, An Appeal to the Colored Citizens of the World, and Raymond Winbush of Vanderbilt University who compared it to W. E. B. Du Bois' Souls of Black Folk.

=== Martin and Henry Louis Gates Jr. ===
Henry Louis Gates Jr., Chair of the African and African American Studies Department and Director of the W. E. B. Du Bois Institute for African and African American Research at Harvard University, was critical of Martin's work, leading Martin to describe him as "Brer Gates" (an allusion to Brer Rabbit) and to write:

"Whenever the other folks have wanted anybody to beat the rest of the race over the head with, Brer Gates has been on the scene, like an HNIC ["Head Negro in Charge"] machine. They gave him an unprecedented full-page op-ed in The New York Times to attack the Nation of Islam's Secret Relationship Between Blacks and Jews. This op-ed was actually typeset in the shape of a Star of David. There is no evidence that Gates even read the book, but he pulled together some platitudes attacking it anyway."

=== Institute for Historical Review ===
In June 2002, Martin presented a talk entitled "Tactics of Organized Jewry in Suppressing Free Speech" at the 14th IHR Conference sponsored by the Institute for Historical Review (IHR), in which he summarizes his experience of the controversy following his accusations about Jews as principal actors in the slave trade. The IHR is the world's leading Holocaust denial organization, publishing articles and holding conferences denying the extermination of European Jewry by Nazi Germany.

== Works ==
- Race First: The Ideological and Organizational Struggles of Marcus Garvey and the Universal Negro Improvement Association, The Majority Press, 1976, 421 pages (ISBN 0-912469-23-4)
- Rare Afro-Americana: A Reconstruction of the Adjer Library (with Wendy Ball), 1981.
- Marcus Garvey, Hero: A First Biography, The Majority Press, 1983 (ISBN 978-0912469058).
- Literary Garveyism: Garvey, Black Arts and the Harlem, The Majority Press, 1983 (ISBN 978-0912469010)
- The Poetical Works of Marcus Garvey (compiled and edited), 1983.
- In Nobody's Backyard: The Grenada Revolution in Its Own Words, edited by Tony Martin with Dessima Williams. Vol. I, The Revolution at Home. Vol. II, Facing the World, 1984.
- African Fundamentalism: A Literary and Cultural Anthology of Garvey's Harlem Renaissance, 1991 (ISBN 978-0912469096).
- The Jewish Onslaught: Despatches from the Wellesley Battlefront, Dover, MA: The Majority Press, 1993 (ISBN 978-0912469300).
- The Pan-African Connection: From Slavery to Garvey and Beyond, The Majority Press (1983), 1998 (ISBN 978-0912469119).
- The Progress of the African Race Since Emancipation and Prospects for the Future (pamphlet), Port of Spain: Emancipation Support Committee / Dover, MA: The Majority Press, 1998 (ISBN 0-912469-35-8).
- Amy Ashwood Garvey, Pan-Africanist, Feminist and Mrs Marcus Garvey No. 1, Or, A Tale of Two Armies, 2007.
- Caribbean History: From Pre-Colonial Origins to the Present, Pearson Education, 2012 (ISBN 978-0-13-220860-4).
