= Barbara Arnwine =

American executive director

Barbara Ruth Arnwine
- Born: March 28, 1951 (age 75); Los Angeles County, California
- Education: Scripps College; Duke University School of Law
- Occupation: Attorney

Barbara Ruth Arnwine (born March 28, 1951) served as the executive director of the Lawyers' Committee for Civil Rights Under Law from 1989 until 2015. Born in southern California, Arnwine is a graduate of Scripps College and Duke University School of Law. After graduating from Duke Law School, she stayed in Durham and worked for the Durham Legal Assistance Program and as a Reginald Huber Smith fellow. She moved on to the legal service's head office in Raleigh, North Carolina in 1979, working on affirmative action policies, reviewing contracts, and legal aid programs. In the 1980s she served as executive director of the Boston Lawyers' Committee for Civil Rights.

She became renowned for her work on the passage of the Civil Rights Act of 1991. She also focused on international civil rights matters, serving as a member of the advance team of the Lawyers’ Committee's South Africa Electoral Observers Delegation. In 1995, she served as the National Convener of the National Conference on African American Women and the Law and led a delegation to the NGO Forum and Fourth World Conference on Women in Beijing. Her involvement contributed to a United Nations Platform for Action that provides protection for women against multiple forms of discrimination. In 2001, Arnwine helped draft provisions of the program for action for the UN World Conference Against Racism, Racial Discrimination, and Xenophobia in Durban, South Africa. In 2003, Arnwine was elected to the Common Cause National Governing Board.

She was a leader of Election Protection (EP), the nation's largest nonpartisan voter protection coalition, launched in 2004 to assist historically disenfranchised persons to exercise the fundamental right to vote. In 2008, EP involved more than 10,000 volunteers and the EP hotline received more than 240,000 calls.

Arnwine has received numerous awards, including the National Bar Association's Gertrude E. Rush Award and the National Black Law Students Association's Sadie T.M. Alexander Award in 2011, the Washington D.C. Freedom's Sisters Award and the Keeper of the Flame Award from the Boston Lawyers' Committee in 2009, the Rockwood Institute Leadership Fellowship in 2008, the National Bar Association's Equal Justice Award and the C. Francis Stradford Award in 2007, and the Charlotte E. Ray Award from the Greater Washington Area Chapter, Women Lawyers Division of the National Bar Association in 2002. She was one among five recipients of the 2011 Gruber Prize for Justice.

Frequenting the conference circuit, Arnwine also writes numerous articles and is regularly featured by media outlets such as the American Bar Association’s Human Rights magazine, The New York Times, The Washington Post, BET, TV One, and other national and local media.
