= Gruber Prize for Justice =

The Gruber Prize for Justice
- Awarded for: Advancing the cause of justice as delivered through the legal system
- Presented by: Peter and Patricia Gruber Foundation
- Reward: US$500,000
- First award: 2001
- Website: gruber.yale.edu

The Gruber Prize for Justice, established in 2001, was one of five international prizes worth US$500,000 awarded by The Peter and Patricia Gruber Foundation, an American non-profit organization.

Recipients were selected by a distinguished panel of international legal experts from nominations received from around the world.

The Gruber Foundation Justice Prize was presented to individuals or organizations for contributions that have advanced the cause of justice as delivered through the legal system. The award was intended to acknowledge individual efforts, as well as to encourage further advancements in the field and progress toward bringing about a fundamentally just world.

The foundation established an annual fellowship at George Washington University Law School between 2009 and 2011, which funded a student to clerk with the International Court of Justice (ICJ) in The Hauge under the ICJ’s University Traineeship Programme. The foundation awarded its final prize in 2011, after which it was merged into the Gruber Program for Global Justice and Women’s Rights and moved to Yale Law School.

== Recipients ==
- 2001: Chief Justice Anthony Gubbay and Sternford Moyo, both of Zimbabwe
- 2002: Fali Sam Nariman, Indian jurist
- 2003: Justice Rosalie Silberman Abella and Madame Justice Bertha Wilson, both of Canada
- 2004: Former Chief Justices Arthur Chaskalson and Pius Langa, both of South Africa
- 2005: Dato Param Cumaraswamy, Malaysian lawyer
- 2006: Aharon Barak, former President of the Supreme Court of Israel
- 2007: Justice Carmen Argibay of Argentina; Judge Carlos Cerda Fernández of Chile; and international lawyer Mónica Feria Tinta of Peru
- 2008: Judge Thomas Buergenthal and Jerome J. Shestack
- 2009: Bryan Stevenson of the Equal Justice Initiative; European Roma Rights Centre
- 2010: The Honourable Michael Kirby; John Dugard; and the Indian Law Resource Center
- 2011: Barbara Arnwine; Morris Dees; Association for Civil Rights in Israel; Center for Legal and Social Studies; and Kurdish Human Rights Project
