= Hatreon =

Alt-right crowdfunding website

Hatreon was an invite-only crowdfunding website lacking the content policing restrictions of other such websites. It was first soft launched in June 2017 by Cody Wilson, who founded it in response to attempts by Patreon and Kickstarter to crack down on users violating their content policing policies. It went live in August 2017, but without fully launching. It had attracted high-profile alt-right and neo-Nazi figures as its users, including Andrew Anglin and Richard B. Spencer. It has been described as "the go-to crowdfunding platform for the 'alt-right.'"

Since at least early February 2018, the site has been unable to process pledges.
