= Eric Dreiband =

American lawyer (born 1963)

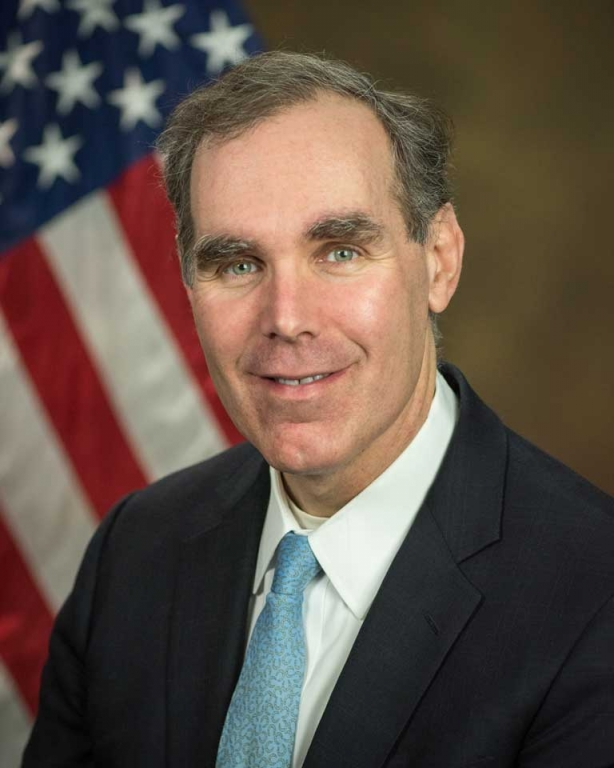
- Official portrat, 2019

United States Assistant Attorney General for the Civil Rights Division
- In office October 12, 2018 – January 8, 2021
- President: Donald Trump
- Preceded by: Tom Perez (2013)
- Succeeded by: Kristen Clarke

General Counsel of the Equal Employment Opportunity Commission
- In office 2003–2005
- President: George W. Bush
- Preceded by: Clifford Gregory Stewart
- Succeeded by: Ronald S. Cooper

Personal details
- Born: Eric Stefan Dreiband; September 23, 1963 (age 62) Indianapolis, Indiana, U.S.
- Education: Princeton University (BA); Harvard University (MTS); Northwestern University (JD)

Eric Stefan Dreiband (born September 23, 1963) is an American lawyer. While a partner at Jones Day, he was nominated by President Donald Trump to serve as the United States Assistant Attorney General for the Civil Rights Division. The Senate confirmed his appointment on October 11, 2018.

He resigned on January 8, 2021, without providing a specific reason for the departure.

== Early life and education ==
Dreiband graduated from Princeton University with a B.A. in history in 1986. He has a Master of Theological Studies from the Harvard Divinity School, and a Juris Doctor from the Northwestern University Pritzker School of Law.

== Career ==
Upon graduating from law school, Dreiband served as a law clerk to Judge William J. Bauer of the United States Court of Appeals for the Seventh Circuit. Following his clerkship, Dreiband served in the Independent Counsel's office for the Whitewater controversy. After a stint in private practice, Dreiband served in the administration of George W. Bush as deputy administrator of the United States Department of Labor's Wage and Hour Division (WHD) from 2002 to 2003 and as general counsel of the Equal Employment Opportunity Commission from 2003 to 2005. He again returned to private practice in 2005 and joined Jones Day in 2008.

== Notable cases ==
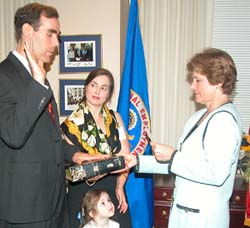
Dreiband takes oath as EEOC General Counsel in 2003

- In 2002, Dreiband was part of the Equal Employment Opportunity Commission (EEOC) team that sued Chicago meat processing company Carl Buddig & Co. for not hiring black people at its Chicago and South Holland meat processing plants and for limiting higher pay opportunities for women. The company settled and agreed to pay US$2.5 million and reform its hiring practices.
- González v. Abercrombie & Fitch – in 2004, he represented the EEOC in a lawsuit against retailer Abercrombie & Fitch. The company was accused of discriminating against African Americans, Latinos, Asian Americans, and women by preferentially offering floor sales positions and store management positions to white males. The company agreed to a settlement of the class-action suit.
- Equal Employment Opportunity Commission v. Abercrombie & Fitch Stores – he represented Abercrombie & Fitch in a lawsuit filed in 2009 in U.S. District Court by the U.S. Equal Employment Opportunity Commission. In June 2008, 17-year-old Samantha Elauf, who wears a hijab due to her religious beliefs, applied for a sales position at an Abercrombie Kids store in Tulsa, Oklahoma. She claimed the manager told her the headscarf violates the store's "Look Policy". The United States Supreme Court ruled 8–1 against the company in 2015.
- In 2016, Dreiband defended the University of North Carolina in its choice to abide by the Public Facilities Privacy & Security Act that had been passed earlier that year. The statewide law disallowed people from using public bathrooms corresponding to the gender with which they identify; it was repealed in March 2017.

== Controversies ==
On June 10, 2020, Dreiband sent a letter to Montgomery County Maryland executives expressing First Amendment concerns regarding county orders. The letter urges County Executive Elrich and the County Council to ensure that the county's executive orders and enforcement of them respect both the right of residents to assemble and practice their faith. But the letter was based on flawed reporting, which the Justice Department has failed to publicly correct.

The DOJ was trying to make a point about a Black Lives Matter protest organized by high school students on the grounds of the Connie Morella Library in Bethesda on June 2. Dreiband's letter informed County officials that if they were going to support “hundreds of people packed into a library” for a protest, they should be equally supportive of people gathering to worship during the pandemic. But the Connie Morella Library was closed.

Photos captured by local ABC-affiliate WJLA show that the protest was in the library's parking lot. A makeshift lectern for the rally was set up in front of the library's doors, and hundreds of attendees can be seen in photos seated on the ground outside the library. Asked about the discrepancy, a Justice Department spokesperson acknowledged to HuffPost that local Fox News affiliate WTTG had gotten the facts wrong in its story about the protest, though the station has since corrected its report.

The DOJ's original letter containing the claim that hundreds of people packed into the library could still be found on the department's website, as of May 5, 2025.

Legal offices
Preceded by Clifford Gregory Stewart	General Counsel of the Equal Employment Opportunity Commission; 2003–2005	Succeeded by Ronald S. Cooper
Preceded by Tom Perez	United States Assistant Attorney General for the Civil Rights Division; 2018–2021	Succeeded by Kristen Clarke
