= Bernard G. Segal =

American lawyer and civil rights activist (1907–1997)

Bernie Segal
- Born: Bernard G. Segal; June 11, 1907; New York City, New York U.S.
- Died: June 1, 1997 (aged 89); Philadelphia, Pennsylvania U.S.
- Occupation: Lawyer
- Years active: 1924-1997
- Spouse: Geraldine "Jerry" Segal

Bernard G. Segal (June 11, 1907 – June 1, 1997) was an American lawyer known for his advocacy for the poor and his work in the civil rights movement.

== Early life and education ==
Segal was born in New York City but spent his childhood in Allentown and Philadelphia. He received both his bachelor's and law degrees at the University of Pennsylvania.

== Career ==
Upon his graduation from law school, Segal became a deputy attorney general in the office of William A. Schnader, the Attorney General of Pennsylvania.

At 24, Segal was the youngest deputy attorney general in state history.

When Schnader lost a race for governor and established his own firm in 1935, Segal quickly became a partner, eventually serving as chairman of the firm, now known as Schnader Harrison Segal & Lewis.

In the 1950s, Segal became the first Jewish lawyer elected chancellor of the Philadelphia Bar Association, the nation's oldest bar association. In 1969, he became president of the American Bar Association. In fifty years as a corporate lawyer specializing in appellate work, Segal represented blue-chip clients, including Bell Telephone, RCA, NBC, Hertz Corporation, Gimbel Brothers, and also United Parcel Service, where he served for many years as director and general counsel.

Segal argued nearly 50 cases before the Supreme Court of the United States, but as a lawyer Segal took a broad view of his calling. Segal was known as the nation's foremost advocate of merit selection of judges. In the mid-1950s he persuaded then Attorney General Herbert Brownell and President Dwight D. Eisenhower to submit to the American Bar Association Committee on the Federal Judiciary the names of all prospective federal judicial nominees, including the Supreme Court, for a report and recommendation on their qualifications. That practice has continued ever since, with Presidents very rarely appointing a Federal Judge found "Not Qualified" by the ABA Committee. Segal chaired that Committee for six years and continued his key role in judicial selection long after he relinquished his chairmanship.

In 1963, as the civil rights revolution was heating up, Segal called Attorney General Robert F. Kennedy and asked why the President was not marshaling lawyers to help the civil rights movement. President John F. Kennedy convened a meeting of 244 prominent lawyers suggested by Segal and established the Lawyers' Committee for Civil Rights Under Law, with Segal as co-chairman. The Committee sent lawyers to defend civil rights workers in southern states and played a critical role in advancing civil rights, not only in the south, but in many northern cities as well. Segal's wife, Dr. Geraldine Segal, a civil rights scholar in her own right, worked closely with Segal in their civil rights activities.

Segal also played a seminal role in furthering legal services for the poor, chairing the Advisory Committee on the National Legal Services Program under President Lyndon B. Johnson and enlisting lawyers throughout the nation to provide legal services to the indigent. He was devoted to the principle that the most despised defendants also deserved a defense. In 1953, he organized the defense of nine Philadelphians denounced as Communists.

Segal was also the lead defense attorney in the Jeffrey Macdonald case.

Segal received honorary degrees from the University of Pennsylvania, Temple University, Villanova University, Franklin and Marshall College, Dropsie College, Jewish Theological Seminary of America, Vermont Law School, Georgetown University, Suffolk University and Hebrew Union College-Jewish Institute of Religion. He received many other awards and honors from institutions and organizations throughout the world, among them the World Peace Through Law Award as the "World's Greatest Lawyer"; the National Civil Rights Award by the Attorney General of the United States; first Lifetime Achievement Award of the Lawyers' Committee for Civil Rights Under Law; the National Human Relations Award by the National Conference of Christians and Jews; and the Judge William H. Hastie Award of the NAACP Legal Defense Fund.

In 1981, the University of Pennsylvania Law Review devoted a unique issue to Segal, with tributes from Supreme Court Justices William J. Brennan, Jr. and Lewis F. Powell, Jr., Judges Arlin Adams and Louis H. Pollak and other legal luminaries. In that Review, former Judge A. Leon Higginbotham stated:

When the high court of history writes its judgment in praise of Bernard G. Segal, it will place an even higher value on his indefatigable efforts to expand and improve legal services for the poor, the powerless, and the dispossessed. I will note his mighty role in pushing the organized bar and many individual lawyers to accept the eradication of barriers of racial discrimination and religious bigotry as part of their mission. It will stress his efforts to maintain and improve the independence and excellence of the judiciary."

== Personal life ==
Segal died on June 1, 1997, 10 days before his 90th birthday, from complications of cancer at his home in Philadelphia, Pennsylvania.
