= Param Cumaraswamy =

Malaysian lawyer

Dato' Param Cumaraswamy is a Malaysian lawyer from Kuala Lumpur. Chair of the Malaysian Bar Council from 1986 to 1988 and United Nations Special Rapporteur on the Independence of Judges and Lawyers by the UN Commission on Human Rights from 1994 to 2003, he won the 2005 Gruber Prize for Justice. He is a member of the Crimes Against Humanity Initiative Advisory Council, a project of the Whitney R. Harris World Law Institute at Washington University School of Law in St. Louis to establish the world's first treaty on the prevention and punishment of crimes against humanity.
