= Taylor Dumpson =

American attorney

- Born: 1995 or 1996 (age 29–30); Washington, D.C., U.S.
- Education: American University (BA); Benjamin N. Cardozo School of Law (JD)
- Occupation: Attorney
- Employer(s): Rhode Island Attorney General Office; Lawyers' Committee for Civil Rights Under Law

Taylor Dumpson (born 1995 or 1996) is an American attorney and associate counsel at the Lawyers' Committee for Civil Rights Under Law. After she became the first Black woman president of the student government at American University, she was the target of hate crimes, and responded to an online troll storm with a successful lawsuit.

== Early life and education ==
Dumpson was born in Washington D.C. and raised in the Eastern Shore of Maryland. Her mother is an executive vice president at the University of Maryland Eastern Shore and her father is an executive movie producer. Her family ties to the Eastern Shore begin in the 1800s. She has described the killing of Trayvon Martin as a life-changing event and a "generational moment" that inspired her to become more involved in activism during high school. She graduated from Wicomico High School in Salisbury, Maryland; then from DC's American University with a BA in Law and Society. She graduated and earned her juris doctor from Benjamin N. Cardozo School of Law at Yeshiva University New York.

At American University, she was a member of the predominantly Black sorority Alpha Kappa Alpha, and began her term as the first Black woman president of the student government on April 30, 2017. On May 1, bananas hung from nooses, some including notes directed at her sorority, were found on campus, and the FBI began to investigate. Students protested and hundreds attended a town hall meeting in response to the incident.

Within days, Dumpson was told by the Anti-Defamation League that the neo-Nazi website The Daily Stormer run by Andrew Anglin had targeted her for a "troll storm" of cyberharassment, including by posting her picture and social media contact information. She has said she increased security precautions and experienced PTSD as a result of the harassment that followed.

=== Dumpson v. Ade ===
In April 2018, with representation from the Lawyers' Committee for Civil Rights Under Law, Dumpson filed a lawsuit alleging violations of the District of Columbia Human Rights Act of 1977 and the D.C. Bias-Related Crimes Act of 1989 against Andrew Anglin, Evan James McCarty, and Brian Andrew Ade. The lawsuit also included a variety of allegations against Anglin, including incitement of intentional infliction of emotional distress, interfering with her right to equal opportunity to education, and conspiracy to commit stalking. In December 2018, Dumpson reached a settlement with McCarty that was influenced by principles of restorative justice and included his agreement to apologize to Dumpson, to renounce white supremacy, and to complete community service.

In August 2019, in a default judgment, Dumpson was awarded more than $725,000 in damages, costs, and fees against Anglin, as well as restraining orders against Anglin, Ade, and Moonbase Holdings, known as the company that supports The Daily Stormer. In her ruling, Judge Rosemary M. Collyer found Dumpson was "targeted because of her race and gender", and Dumpson's attorney Kristen Clarke described the ruling as "historic" due to the finding that racist online trolling can cause interference with equal access to a public accommodation.

== Career ==
Dumpson became a 2021 President's Fellow at the Lawyers' Committee for Civil Rights Under Law, a DC-based organization that promotes civil rights, and has continued at the organization as associate counsel.

In October 2023 she became employed at the Rhode Island Attorney General's Office as a Special Assistant Attorney General in the Family/District Court Unit. Currently she works in Criminal Division of the Rhode Island Attorney General’s Office.

Dumpson is barred in the State of Rhode Island, the State of New York, the District of Columbia and the United States District Court for the Southern District of New York.
