= Center for Legal and Social Studies =

The Center for Legal and Social Studies (Spanish: Centro de Estudios Legales y Sociales; acronym: CELS) is an Argentine non-governmental organization based in Buenos Aires. It was founded in 1979 and it is oriented towards the promotion and defense of human rights as well as the strengthening of democratic institutions. Its current president is social anthropologist Sofía Tiscornia.

== History ==
Between 1970 and 1980 in Argentina there was a big movement of the creation and development of human rights defense organizations such as: Mothers of the Plaza de Mayo, Grandmothers of the Plaza de Mayo, and HIJOS This was because of two main circumstances: the Dirty War and the universal development of the human rights concept after the two World Wars. The Center of Legal and Social Studies was founded under this context by the end of the last military dictatorship of Argentina.

The founders of this organization were the lawyers Alfredo Galleti, Augusto Conte, Boris Pasik, Emilio Mignone and the scientist Jose Westerkamp. This NGO had been developing since 1978 and it was formally established in 1980. The Westerkamp family were active members and their studies focused on cases and methods of repression. Gustavo Westerkamp and Doctor José Westerkamp were both jailed by the early 1980s for the threat they posed to Argentine dictator Jorge Rafael Videla.

During the first stage, the organization was focused on documenting human rights violations by the dictatorship and imparting legal assistance to the relatives of the victims, especially those involved in cases of forced disappearance.

After Argentina became a democratic state this organization became focused, not only on human rights defense, but also on promoting legal and institutional reforms aimed at improving the quality of democratic institutions.

== Board Members ==
Its founder and first president was Emilio Mignone, a lawyer whose daughter was forcibly disappeared by the dictatorship. From 2000 to 2021, Horacio Verbitsky was president of the organization, he was also part of the board of directors of the Latin American division of the Human Rights Watch. Laura Jordán de Conte is the vice president.

== Publications ==
- Law of Fair Access to Housing: Guide for its Application, 2017, ISBN 978-987-4195-02-9
- The Right to Social Protest in Argentina, 2017, ISBN 978-987-4195-00-5
- Torture in Prisons: Why Are Violence Prevention Policies Not Effective In Argentina?, 2017, ISBN 978-987-29080-9-6
- Harassed: Violence and Police Arbitrariness in Working Class Neighborhoods, 2016, ISBN 978-987-29080-7-2
- Crossing the Wall: Challenges and Proposals for the Extermination of the Insane Asylum, 2015, ISBN 978-987-29080-5-8

CELS also serves as editorial for other authors

- Frontalini, Daniel; Caiati, María Cristina, 1984, The Myth of the Dirty War
- Tiscornia, Sofía, 2008, Human Rights Activism and State Bureaucracies: the Walter Bulacio Case ISBN 978-987-1397-18-1
- Pita, Maria Victoria, 2010, Ways of Living and Ways of Dying: Activism Against Police Brutality ISBN 978-987-1397-53-2
- Villalta, Carla, 2012. Deliveries and Kidnappings: the Role of the State in the Appropriation of Children ISBN 978-987-1397-79-2

== Memberships ==
CELS is a member of:

- The International League for Human Rights (ILHR)
- The International Commission of Jurists
- The World Organization Against Torture
- The International Federation for Human Rights

== Awards ==
- Letelier-Moffitt Human Rights Award (1983)
- Gruber Prize for Justice (2011)
