= Lawyers' Committee for Civil Rights Under Law =

Civil rights organization in the United States

- Founded: 21 June 1963
- Type: Nonpartisan
- Purpose: Civil rights and voting rights
- Location: Washington, D.C.
- Region served: United States
- Members: 220
- Key people: Damon Hewitt, President and Executive Director
- Website: lawyerscommittee.org

The Lawyers' Committee for Civil Rights Under Law, or simply the Lawyers' Committee, is an American civil rights organization founded in 1963 at the request of President John F. Kennedy.

When the Lawyers' Committee was created, its existence was a major change in how the bar and how local and state judiciaries were able to help oppressed racial minorities during the civil rights movement. The organization called on the private bar to bring its resources to bear on the major civil rights problems beleaguering the nation; some of its earliest leaders included Bernard G. Segal, Harrison Tweed, Lloyd Cutler, Cecil Burney, Berl Bernhard, and John Doyle. During a historic June 21, 1963 meeting at the White House, 244 lawyers filled the East Room of the White House. Vice President Lyndon B. Johnson spoke to the lawyers about the discrimination he witnessed first-hand in the South and Attorney General Robert F. Kennedy argued that lawyers had a unique role to play advancing civil rights for African Americans because of the oath that lawyers swore to uphold the constitution. At the end of the meeting, Bernard Segal and Harrison Tweed volunteered to lead the committee of lawyers, starting with those assembled at the White House. The organization has assisted with some major civil rights advancements over the years, including significant amendments to the Voting Rights Act of 1965 that were made in 1982; it has also had a substantial impact to civil rights legislation, including Executive Order 11246—preventing employers from discriminating based on race—and a number of voting rights cases. Since its creation, the Lawyers' Committee has served as an expert on civil rights matters, often testifying before Congress and issuing public statements on pressing civil rights challenges.

There are eight local affiliates of the Lawyers' Committee: Boston, Massachusetts (created in 1968); Chicago, Illinois (created in 1969); Denver, Colorado (created in 1978); Jackson, Mississippi (created in 1965); Los Angeles, California (created in 1970); Philadelphia, Pennsylvania (created in 1969); San Francisco, California (created in 1968); and the District of Columbia (created in 1968). Each affiliate is independently funded and governed, and together with the national Lawyers' Committee, they work on both national and state policy issues.

== History ==
During a June 21, 1963, meeting at the White House, in the midst of the American civil rights movement, President John F. Kennedy suggested the formation of a group of lawyers to counter and reduce racial tensions by way of volunteer citizen actions. On July 10, the Lawyers' Committee for Civil Rights Under Law was publicly announced. The first co-chairs of the committee were two well-known figures in the civil rights and legal fields, Bernard Segal and Harrison Tweed. Over a hundred lawyers volunteered to serve in the organization, with both white and black attorneys being represented. Membership also included five past presidents of the American Bar Association and four members of its board, as well as twelve current presidents of state bar associations, and officials from the NAACP and its legal defense fund. On August 9, 1963, the group officially registered as a nonprofit based in Washington, D.C. Its first executive director, David Stahl, was named in December 1963.

The group's first goal was to counter legal efforts to preserve segregation in Mississippi. The Mississippi office of the organization opened on June 14, 1965, with a mission of getting the bar to take on the professional responsibility for leading the American civil rights movement and providing legal services where they would otherwise be unavailable.

At the time, Alabama Governor George Wallace had vowed to resist court-ordered desegregation of the University of Alabama. Voting rights activist Medgar Evers was assassinated inside his home in Mississippi on June 11. These events galvanized private lawyers to call for officials to commit to the rule of law. These events also prompted President Kennedy to call for private lawyers to do more to defend the civil rights of Black citizens, with Evers' assassination amounting to the last straw. The organization's long-standing mission is to secure equal justice for all through the rule of law by enlisting the leadership of the private bar. While the Lawyers' Committee works to stop all civil rights violations, the majority of its work targets the inequities that primarily confront African Americans and other people of color.

== Projects ==
The Lawyers' Committee for Civil Rights Under Law is structured around a number of projects that it operates on an ongoing basis:

- The Criminal Justice Project
- The Economic Justice Project
- The Educational Opportunities Project
- The Election Protection coalition
- The Fair Housing and Community Development Project
- The Special Litigation and Advocacy Project
- The James Byrd, Jr. Center to Stop Hate Project
- The Voting Rights Project

== Notable cases ==
=== Voting rights ===
Lawyers' Committee for Civil Rights Under Law v. Presidential Advisory Commission on Election Integrity

Georgia Coalition for the Peoples' Agenda, Inc. et al v. Kemp

In October 2018, the Lawyers' Committee and its partners filed a lawsuit against Secretary of State Brian Kemp over the state of Georgia's “exact match” policy. The suit alleged that the policy violates the Voting Rights Act, the National Voter Registration Act, and the First and Fourteenth Amendments to the United States Constitution.

=== Education ===
The Coalition for Equity and Excellence in Maryland Higher Education v. Maryland Higher Education Commission

Beginning in 2000, Maryland failed to meet agreements with the U.S. Department of Education's Office for Civil Rights regarding funding for historically black colleges and universities (HBCUs). The Lawyers' Committee and partners sued, alleging that Maryland has failed to dismantle the vestiges of segregation from its prior de jure system of higher education.

Students for Fair Admissions, Inc. v. President and Fellows of Harvard College et al

The Lawyers' Committee joined this lawsuit with an amicus brief in support of Harvard's admissions process. The lawsuit was intended to dismantle affirmative action, and the Lawyers' Committee's clients—a group of diverse current, former, and potential students of Harvard—were granted special status to testify in court.

Students for Fair Admissions, Inc. v. University of North Carolina, et al

The Lawyers' Committee joined this other anti-affirmative action lawsuit with an amicus brief in support of UNC's admissions process.

=== Hate crimes ===
Taylor Dumpson v. Brian Andrew Ade et al

The Lawyers' Committee represented Taylor Dumpson, an American University student who was targeted in a hate crime on her first day in office as the university's first-ever female African-American student body president.

=== Census ===
City of San Jose v. Ross

The Lawyers' Committee and partners filed a lawsuit to prevent Secretary of Commerce Wilbur Ross from adding a citizenship question to the 2020 Census, as experts believe such a question would chill responses and lower crucial funding.

=== Criminal justice ===
Dade et al v. Sherwood Arkansas, City of et al

The Lawyers' Committee, in partnership with the American Civil Liberties Union, filed a lawsuit on behalf of five residents of Sherwood, Arkansas, to end a bad checks court system that imprisoned people for writing "hot checks".

Joseph Allen et al v. John Bel Edwards et al

The Lawyers' Committee and partners filed a lawsuit to fix the Louisiana court system that was denying poor people their constitutional right to counsel.

United States v. Moore, 486 F.2d 1139 (D.C. Cir. 1973); Gorham v. United States, 339 A.2d 401 (D.C. 1975) – the Lawyers' Committee attempted to establish that abolish criminal penalties for drug use by addicts, based on the theory that addiction removes the free will necessary to not use. The United States Court of Appeals for the District of Columbia Circuit and the District of Columbia Court of Appeals rejected these arguments.

== Notable alumni and associated persons ==
- John F. Kennedy
- Sadie Tanner Mossell Alexander
- Barbara Arnwine
- Jacqueline A. Berrien
- Cornell William Brooks
- John J. Conyers Jr.
- Anita Earls
- William L. Marbury Jr.
- Gay McDougall
- Milan C. Miskovsky
- James Robertson
- David S. Tatel
- Randolph W. Thrower

== See also ==
- Election Protection
