= University Centers for Rational Alternatives =

American university groups

The University Centers for Rational Alternatives (formerly known as Coordinating Centers for Democratic Opinion) were American university groups that aimed to bring together disparate viewpoints in an academic, non-violent manner. The organisation was initially formed by Professor Sydney Hook of New York University following student riots in 1968.

Hook stated that the purpose of these organizations was to support academic freedom and rational inquiry through appropriate means in the aftermath of campus protests and a perceived rise in student radical politics. The organisation spoke out against affirmative action and racial or sex quotas for universities.

Its Columbia University branch had a journal called Measure.
