= Kurdish Human Rights Project =

The Kurdish Human Rights Project is the only non-partisan human rights organisation consistently working in the Kurdish regions of Turkey, Iraq, Iran, Syria and elsewhere. It is a registered charity, founded and based in London in 1992, and its supporters include Kurds and non-Kurds.

Its activities include litigation and advocacy, trial observation and fact-finding missions, research and publications and public awareness, education and communication initiatives.

In 2005 it was awarded the Sigrid Rausing Trust Award for 'Outstanding Leadership in International Human Rights'. It was also short-listed for the 2004 Human Rights Award by the Law Society of England and Wales, Liberty and Justice.

Its cases have established precedents at the European Court of Human Rights on issues including the death penalty, detentions without trial, rape by or with the acquiescence of state actors and the use of blindfolds in detention.

It has also played a highly visible role in raising awareness of social and environmental concerns surrounding dam projects including the Ilisu and Yusufeli dams in south-east Turkey and the Baku-Tbilisi-Ceyhan oil pipeline.
