= .at =

Top-level Internet domain for Austria

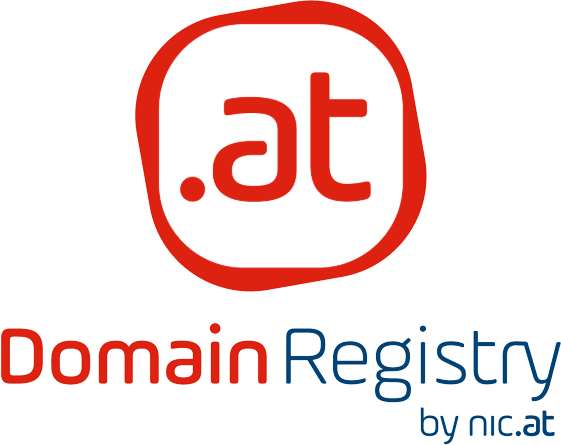
- Introduced: 20 January 1988
- TLD type: Country code top-level domain
- Status: Active
- Registry: nic.at
- Sponsor: nic.at
- Intended use: Entities connected with Austria
- Actual use: Very popular in Austria, also used for English-language domain hacks
- Registered domains: 1,468,838 (December 2022)
- Registration restrictions: None, except for restricted subdomains .gv.at and .ac.at
- Structure: Registrations are directly at second level, or at third level beneath several second-level labels
- Documents: .at-Domain Registration Guidelines nic.at - Terms of Use
- Dispute policies: none since October 2008
- DNSSEC: yes
- Registry website: www.nic.at

.at is the Internet country code top-level domain (ccTLD) for Austria. It was introduced on 20 January 1988 and initially administered by the University of Vienna, before being taken over in 1998 by nic.at, based in Salzburg.

== Second-level domains ==
The .at top-level domain has a number of second-level domains:

Domain	Intended use
.ac.at	Reserved for academic institutions, especially universities
.gv.at	Reserved for the government as well as federal and state authorities
.co.at	Intended for commercially oriented companies
.or.at	Intended for all kinds of organizations
.priv.at	Intended for private Austrian individuals

However, it is also possible to register directly at the top level.

Domains under .at, .or.at, and .co.at can be registered without restrictions. No residence or office in Austria is required. Only .ac.at (administered by the Austrian academic network ACOnet) and .gv.at (administered by the Vienna City Administration on behalf of the Ministry for Digital and Economic Affairs) are not freely registrable. The priv.at domain is operated by the association VIBE!AT.

== Known domain hacks ==
Given the number of English words that end with -at, this presents the possibility for many domain hacks.

Many Austrian domain names were registered for English words that end with "at". Domain hacks treating "at" as a word in its own right (such as arrive.at) are widespread.

As of today, there are very few such domain names left available on the domain prime market as the result of domain name speculation.

Most of them can be bought on the domain secondary market. Only a few of these domain names are actually used.

Some known examples of the Austrian domain hack are:

- donteat.at, a popular Foursquare service
- hailst.at, official website of Mississippi State Bulldogs athletics

== Properties ==
An .at domain may be between one and 63 characters in length, and registration is typically completed within minutes. Registrations of internationalized domain names are accepted. Since 31 March 2004, the use of German umlauts and other special characters has been supported. In mid-2007, it became possible to register domains consisting solely of digits, though this met with limited interest compared to other ccTLDs. Since 2004, .at has supported internationalized domain names (IDNs), including lowercase letters from the ISO 8859-1 character set as well as the characters œ, š, and ž from the Unicode Latin Extended-A range.

Since 15 December 2011, .at has implemented Domain Name System Security Extensions (DNSSEC) to ensure the authenticity and integrity of Domain Name System data. On 10 February 2012, the DS resource record for .at was entered into the root name servers, enabling signature validation.

Since August 2016, it has been possible to register one- and two-character .at domains. Previously, due to technical requirements dating from 1993, only domains with at least three characters could be allocated.

== Distribution ==
The registry nic.at conducts an annual survey among holders of .at domains. In 2012, this revealed, among other things, that over half of the surveyed companies owned more than six domains, with a quarter owning more than 30.

Due to the liberal registration criteria, .at has experienced steady growth in recent years. In March 2012, exactly 1.1 million domains had been registered. By May 2019, the number had risen to over 1.3 million, equating to 0.15 .at domains per inhabitant. While growth in the 2000s sometimes exceeded 100,000 new domains per year, only around 55,000 were registered in total from 2015 to 2018.

== See also ==
- .wien
