= Nic.at =

Coordinates: 47.8228°N 13.0421°E

nic.at GmbH
- Formerly: nic.at Internet Verwaltungs- und Betriebsgesellschaft m.b.H. (until 19 October 2012)
- Type: GmbH
- Founded: 1998
- Headquarters: Salzburg, Austria
- Owner: Internet Foundation Austria (since 2000)
- Website: www.nic.at

nic.at GmbH, based in Salzburg, is the domain name registry for the country code top-level domain .at. "AT" is the ISO 3166 country code for Austria. Nic.at is owned by the Internet Foundation Austria and has 30 employees. From 1988 until 1998, the University of Vienna was the domain name registry for .at domains.

Tasks of nic.at include:

- Providing information about the domain registration and management, for example, WHOIS queries
- Central registration and administration of Austria-wide domain names ending in .at, .co.at (company). .or.at (organizational)

The Zentraler Informatikdienst [Central Computer Science Service] of the University of Vienna administers the academic domain .ac.at which is exclusively reserved for the academic and school environment. The Federal Chancellery of Austria administers the governmental domain, .gv.at.
