= Election Protection =

American coalition of voting rights activists

Election Protection is an American non-partisan coalition of voting rights activists. The English language hotline is managed by the Lawyers' Committee for Civil Rights Under Law, a national civil rights organization, and accepts complaints from individuals. The Spanish hotline is managed by the NALEO Educational Fund. They also offer hotlines in multiple Asian languages, Arabic, ASL, and have a disability rights hotline.

It was founded in 2002. Election Protection is non-partisan and one of the largest voter protection coalitions in the country. consisting of over 100 local, state and national partners,

In the 2006 general election it received 13,500 reports of voting problems, and considered a fifth of them serious. It received 31,000 calls in 2018. During the 2020 general election, its national hotline received over 230,000 calls.
