= Andrew Anglin =

American neo-Nazi and webhost

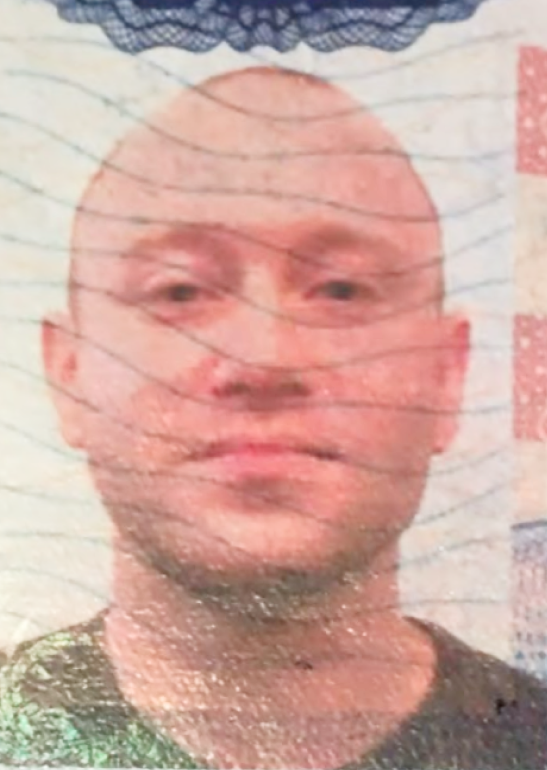
- Anglin in 2013
- Born: July 27, 1984 (age 42); Columbus, Ohio, U.S.
- Education: Worthington Kilbourne High School; Columbus State Community College; Ohio State University
- Occupation: Editor of The Daily Stormer
- Years active: 2006–present
- Known for: The Daily Stormer
- Movement: Neo-Nazism; Alt-right; White supremacy; Far-right politics; Neo-fascism; White nationalism

Andrew Barret Anglin (born July 27, 1984) is an American neo-Nazi and conspiracy theorist, and the editor of the defunct website The Daily Stormer. Through his website, Anglin combines Nazi ideology with internet memes originating primarily from 4chan to promote white supremacy, fascism, and antisemitic conspiracy theories, such as Holocaust denial, to a young audience.

== Early life and education ==
Anglin was born in 1984, and grew up in Worthington, Ohio, a suburb of Columbus. According to both Anglin and his childhood classmates, he was liberal as a youth. He attended the Linworth Alternative Program and the Worthington Kilbourne High School from 1999 to 2003. He was remembered by classmates as a JNCOs-wearing, dreadlocked, atheist vegan who often wore a hoodie with a "fuck racism" patch. His friends in high school reported that his behavior changed during his sophomore year at Linworth, when he exhibited self-harming behavior and began promoting conspiracy theories. After high school, Anglin took classes at Columbus State Community College in 2003, and studied English at Ohio State University for one quarter in 2004.

== Career ==
In 2006, Anglin launched a conspiracy theory website, Outlaw Journalism, which he claims was modeled after the works of Alex Jones and Hunter S. Thompson, whom Anglin admired.

According to Anglin, he left the United States in 2007 and moved to Asia, which he described as an "awesome" experience, and where he developed "affinity for the Asian races". In 2008, after posting on Outlaw Journalism that the only way for humanity to survive was to return to a hunter-gatherer lifestyle, Anglin began traveling around Southeast Asia, eventually ending up in Davao City. In 2011, he spent several weeks with a Tboli village in southern Mindanao, where he initially intended to stay permanently, selling some of his possessions to raise money for a dowry to marry two local Muslim women. In 2012, Anglin wrote that he found the locals to be "a civilized, non-aggressive and industrious people", but he eventually came to consider them too "primitive". He became lonely and only wanted to associate with members of his own race, and said: "By the Grace of God, I found Adolf Hitler."

In 2012, Anglin launched another website, Adventure Quest 2012, which discussed conspiracy theories such as the existence of reptilian humanoids. He described the aim of the site as seeking to "mend the wounds produced by modern society ... and [help] the reader transcend these physical bonds and reach total ascendancy. To mend these wounds, the world must learn to embrace diversity and color". Later in 2012, he launched his first neo-Nazi website, Total Fascism. Feeling that Total Fascism was not appealing to a younger demographic and had articles that were too long, Anglin launched The Daily Stormer on July 4, 2013, with shorter articles and a more provocative style.

In March 2026, MS NOW reported that Anglin announced the closure of The Daily Stormer, writing, ""This is the way of things. The world goes to war. The Daily Stormer shuts down," on March 12.

== Legal issues ==
=== SPLC lawsuit ===
In April 2017, the Southern Poverty Law Center filed a federal lawsuit on behalf of Tanya Gersh, accusing Anglin of instigating an antisemitic harassment campaign against Gersh, a real estate agent from Whitefish, Montana. In July 2019, a judge issued a $14 million default judgment against Anglin, who has refused to appear in court. On November 9, 2022, a warrant was issued for Anglin's arrest for ignoring the judgment.

=== Dean Obeidallah ===
In August 2017, radio presenter Dean Obeidallah sued The Daily Stormer in an Ohio federal court. Anglin had published fake images which purported to show Obeidallah, who is Muslim, celebrating the 2017 Manchester Arena bombing. The lawsuits cleared a longstanding hurdle in March 2018, when U.S. Magistrate Judge Jeremiah Lynch declared that there was sufficient evidence of Anglin being domiciled in Ohio despite living abroad. In July, the court found in Obeidallah's favor, with neither Anglin nor his representatives present in court.

=== Sines v. Kessler ===
In October 2017, Anglin was named as a defendant in a case brought by nine Charlottesville residents following the Unite the Right rally in August 2017. Anglin was named alongside Robert "Azzmador" Ray as responsible for The Daily Stormer website, as well as Moonbase Holdings. A default judgement was entered against Anglin who did not participate in the trial.

=== Taylor Dumpson ===
In May 2018, Taylor Dumpson, the first black student body president at American University, sued Anglin for organizing a racist and sexist trolling campaign against her. She alleges that Anglin had posted her name and picture, as well as links to her Facebook page and the Twitter account of the university's student government, and urged his readers to "troll storm" her, which resulted in many hate-filled and racist online messages directed at her. Although Dumpson and Anglin have not reached a settlement, she settled in December 2018 with one of the people who harassed her, a man from Eugene, Oregon named Evan McCarty who was a neo-Nazi musician and former theatre actor known as "Byron de la Vandal" (named after Byron De La Beckwith, the assassin of Medgar Evers) who served as a member of the fascist Vanguard America and affiliated with the Daily Stormer. McCarty was required to apologize, to renounce white supremacy, to stop trolling and doxing online, and to provide information to and cooperate with authorities in the prosecution of white supremacists. The lawsuit that was brought on her behalf was led by the Lawyers' Committee for Civil Rights Under Law which continues to use litigation as a tool to fight extremism and to slow the efforts of white supremacists.

On August 9, 2019, a Federal judge awarded Dumpson a judgment of over $725,000, to be paid by Andrew Anglin, Brian Andrew Ade, and the shell company which owns The Daily Stormer. The defendants did not show up to contest the lawsuit, so a default judgment was entered against them, consisting of $101,429.28 in compensatory damages, punitive damages of $500,000 and attorney's fees and costs of $124,022.10. A restraining order was also handed down, as was an injunction not to publish anything more about Dumpson. The judgement came only a day after Tanya Gersh was awarded a $14 million default judgment against Anglin.

== Views ==
Anglin has stated: "The goal is to ethnically cleanse White nations of non-Whites and establish an authoritarian government. Many people also believe that the Jews should be exterminated". Anglin also used The Daily Stormer as a platform to promote misogynistic conspiracy theories, claiming that politically active "white women across the Western world" are pushing for liberal immigration policies "to ensure an endless supply of Black and Arab men to satisfy their depraved sexual desires". In July 2018, he summarized his misogynistic views, writing: "Look, I hate women. I think they deserve to be beaten, raped and locked in cages." Anglin has also advocated in the Daily Stormer for the 'legalisation of rape' in America. Anglin is also a Holocaust denier. Although he has espoused neo-Nazi views, he has attempted to rebrand his ideology as "American Nationalism". Anglin stated he agreed with the central tenets of Nazism in 2014, but had reservations over the revival of all aspects of Hitler's regime. A self-proclaimed "troll", Anglin stated that he had been introduced to Nazism on the online imageboard 4chan.

== Criticism ==
Anglin was banned from Twitter/X in 2013, but was reinstated weeks after the site was acquired by Elon Musk in 2022. Anglin was banned again in May 2023.

The Anti-Defamation League says that Anglin is controversial among white supremacists for his past relationships with Asian women during his time as an expat in the Philippines, and for his misogyny, including towards white women.

== See also ==
- Antisemitism in the United States
- Far-right politics in the United States
- Racism in the United States
- Radical right (United States)
