= 171–191 South High Street =

Historic buildings in Columbus, Ohio

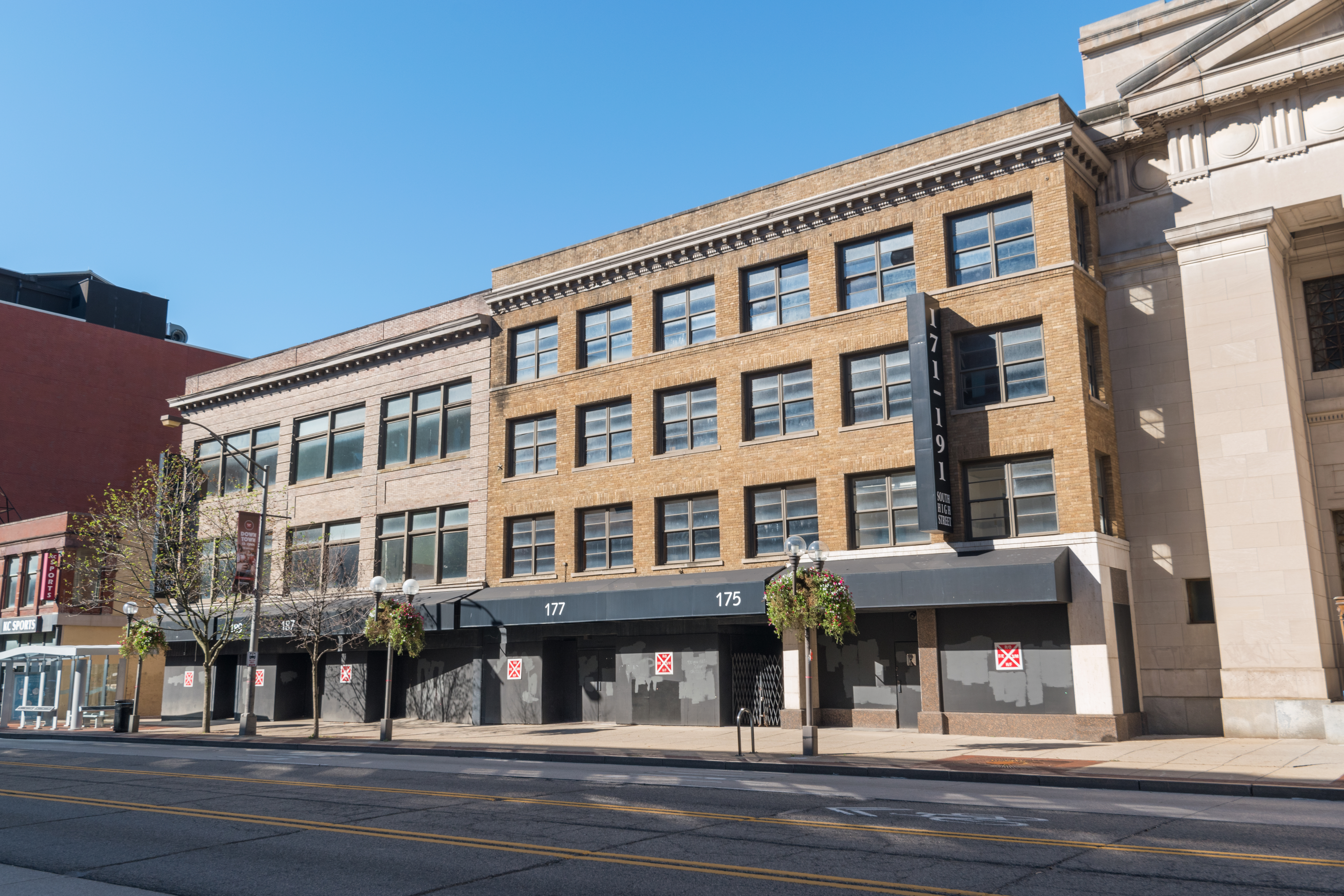
- Interactive map of the 171–191 South High Street area

General information
- Architectural style: Early Twentieth Century Commercial, Italianate
- Location: 171–191 S. High Street, Columbus, Ohio
- Coordinates: 39.95830°N 83.00029°W
- Years built: 19th c. (171–177 S. High); 1906 (185–191 S. High)
- Affiliation: F. & R. Lazarus Company; Kroger Company

171–191 South High Street is a pair of historic buildings in Downtown Columbus, Ohio. The commercial structures have seen a wide variety of retail and service uses through the 20th century, including shoe stores, groceries, opticians, hatters, jewelers, a liquor store, and a car dealership. Both exhibit early 20th century façades; 185–191 South High was constructed in 1906, while 171–177 South High was constructed sometime in the 19th century and was remodeled in the second decade of the 20th century. The latter building was once part of the Lazarus Block, holding the original Lazarus department store. The store grew to encompass a group of seven buildings on the site until it moved to the Lazarus Building in 1909. The same building was again noted in the 1930s, for housing the first Kroger store in Downtown Columbus, which was considered the first supermarket in the city. The buildings, the nearby Ohio National Bank building, and a garage building were sold to a development company in 2023. The developer plans to renovate the bank building and demolish all other structures on the block. In June 2023 the buildings were placed on the Columbus Landmarks Foundation's Most Endangered List.

== Description ==
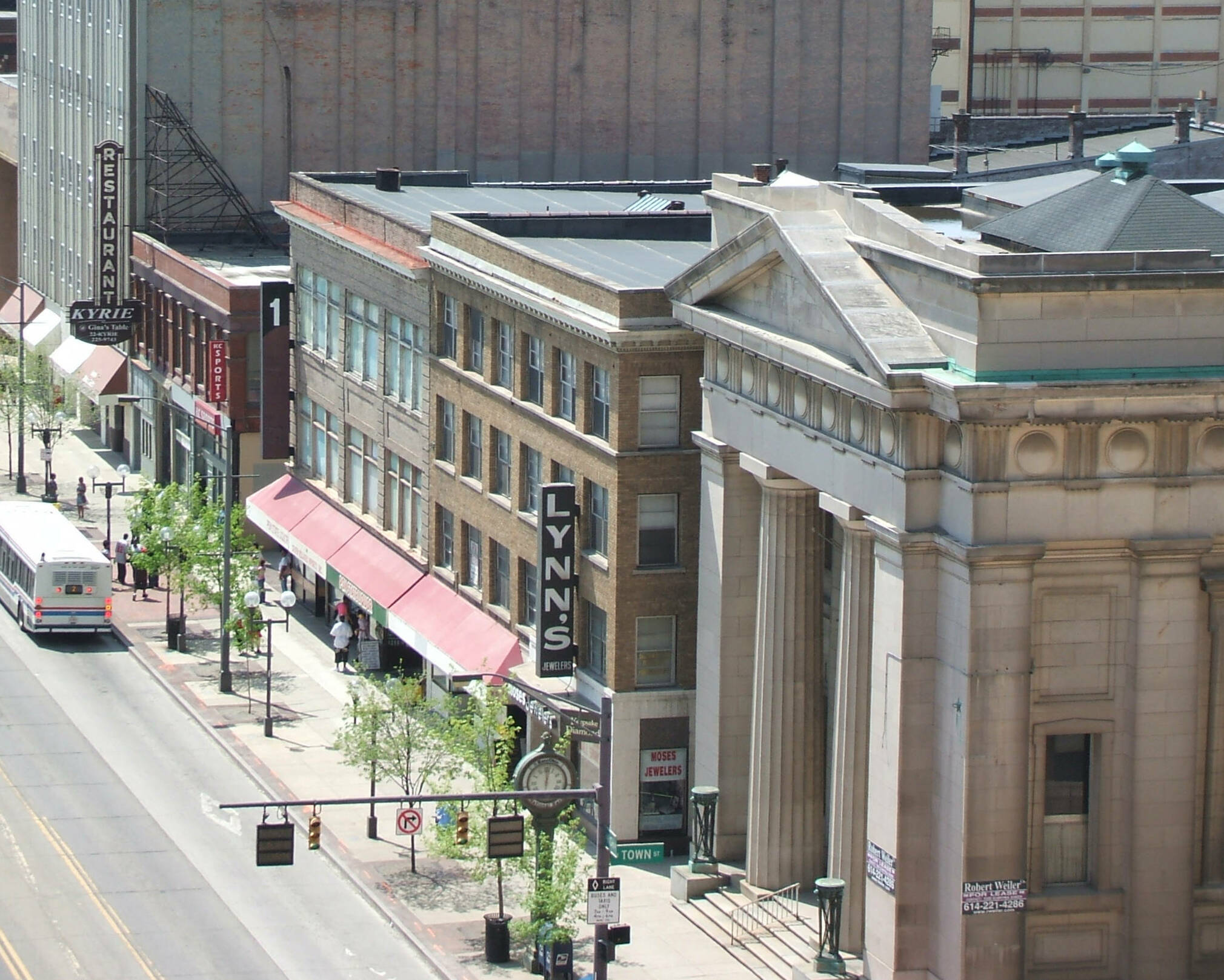
171–191 South High Street (middle) in 2008

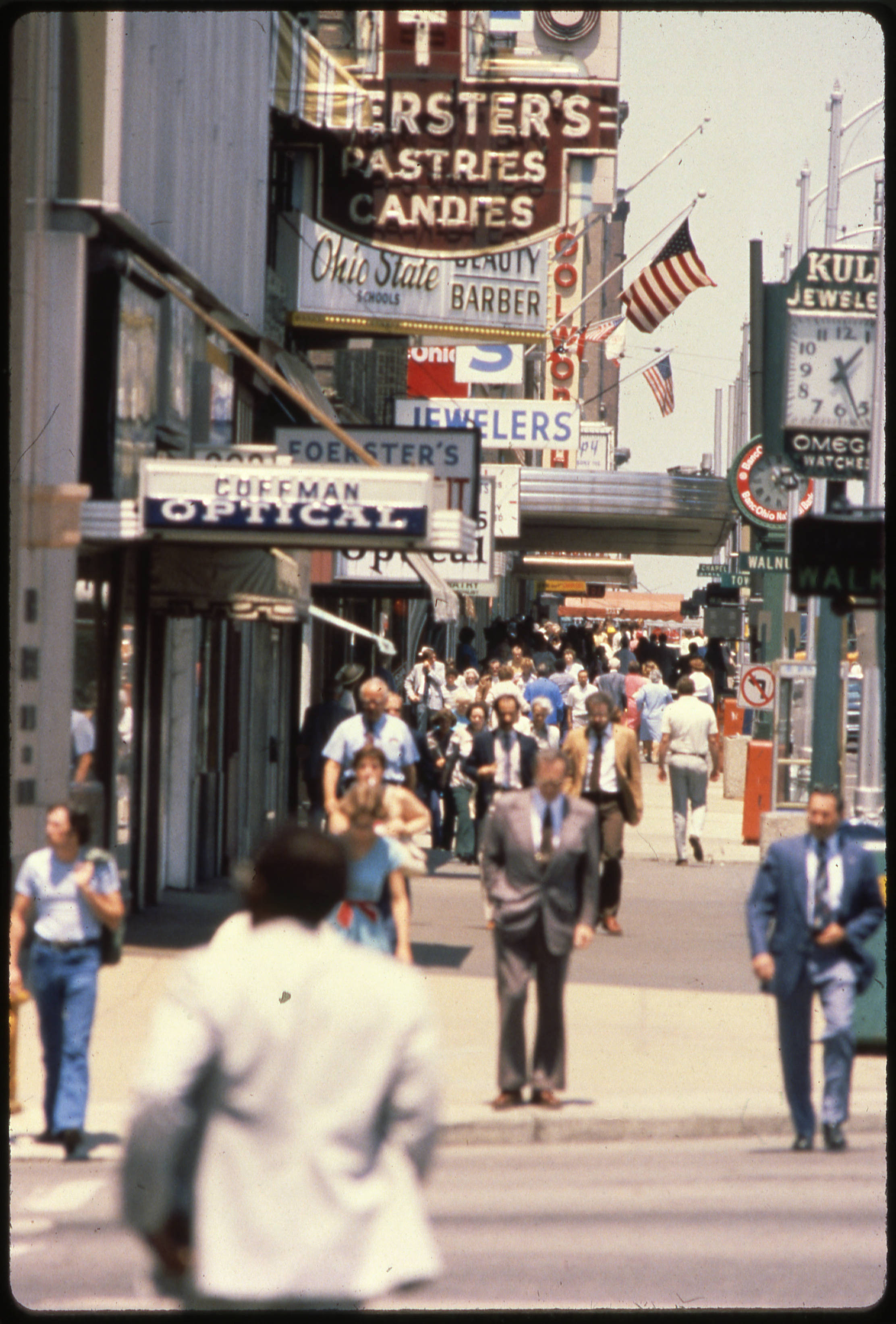
Commercial signage and pedestrian traffic outside the buildings in 1980

171–191 South High Street is a pair of historic buildings located between Walnut and Town Streets, west of High Street in Downtown Columbus. The structures stand across from the Columbus Commons park. The buildings are eligible for listing in national, state, and local historic registers. The pair of early 20th century commercial structures are now rare in Downtown Columbus. While South High Street in the city's downtown district was once lined with innumerous early 20th century retail façades, the buildings at 171, 191, and 195 South High are the only remaining structures of this type. 195–201 South High has been significantly altered by the removal of its upper two stories, likely after a major fire in 1946. While 171 South High is believed to be a 19th-century building, its façade dates to the early 20th century, adding to a street view that has remained largely unchanged for well over 100 years. The low-rise buildings fill their rectangular sites, abutting the sidewalk on High Street, originally with floor-to-ceiling windows to advertise goods for sale. These storefronts have been altered, likely numerous times, since their construction. Both buildings are of unreinforced masonry construction with wood-frame interior structures. Their exteriors are adorned with signs and awnings, not original to their designs.

The structures were designed in the Early Twentieth Century Commercial style with Italianate influences. They embody the commercial-style architecture with their blond brick, little ornamentation, flat roofs, low-rise structure, and storefronts with recessed entries to allow for window-shopping away from the sidewalk. The buildings' decorative brickwork, arched windows, and denticulated cornice are elements popular in Italianate design.

171–177 S. High Street is a four-story building, with each floor of the building's main façade containing six mid-20th century two-over-two windows with horizontal mullions and stone sills. The upper three floors of the building utilize buff brick, mostly laid in a common bond pattern, though the second and third stories feature bricks laid upright as lintels above each window. On the fourth story, upright bricks rest above the windows though they run across the entire façade. Below this story lies a brick and stone stringcourse; above it is a denticulated cornice.

185–191 S. High Street has 60 feet (18 m) of frontage on High Street, and stretches 110 feet west on Walnut Street. While only slightly shorter than its pair, the building only contains three floors. The upper two floors of its High Street façade are of a lighter buff brick. The floors have large fixed plate glass windows with transoms; these are set in pairs in the middle, and in sets of three on the ends. They are separated vertically by recessed panels of brick; early in the building's history, the panels were affixed with signs for the school utilizing the building's upper floors. Flanking the windows above and to their sides are brick bands, and the building is topped with a similar denticulated cornice. The High Street façade wraps around about 20 feet onto Walnut Street, though the windows become narrower, and the second-floor windows uniquely feature stone keystones. The remainder of the south façade, and the entire east façade, are made of red brick above a stone foundation. The façades are plain, marked only by segmental-arched windows of varying heights, again featuring stone sills. As originally built, the interior was brightly lit and well ventilated, and lauded by The Columbus Dispatch at the time as a beautiful building with fine rooms and equipment.

== History ==
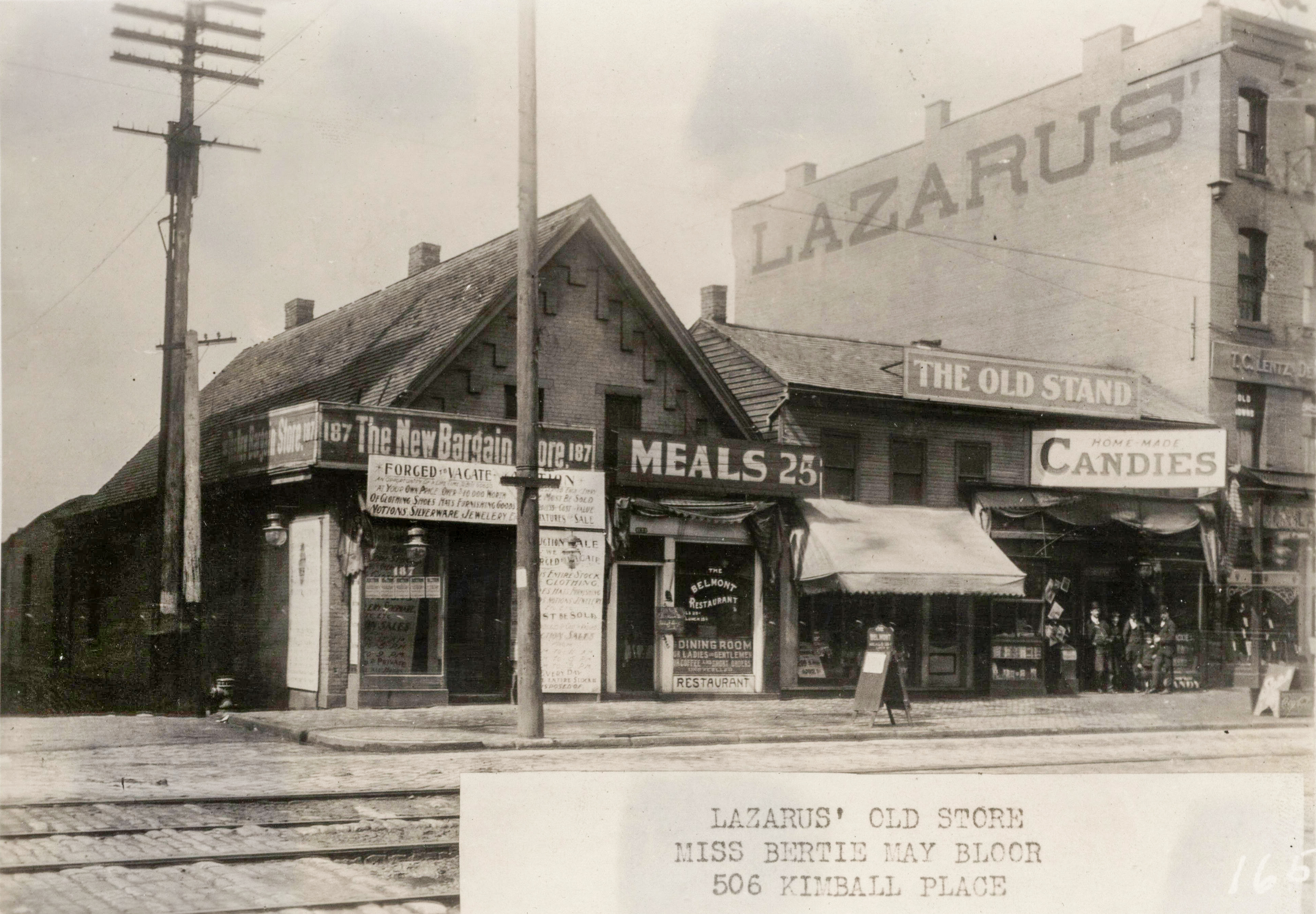
Previous buildings at Walnut and High, 1905; the store at left was holding a sell-out sale before the buildings were demolished

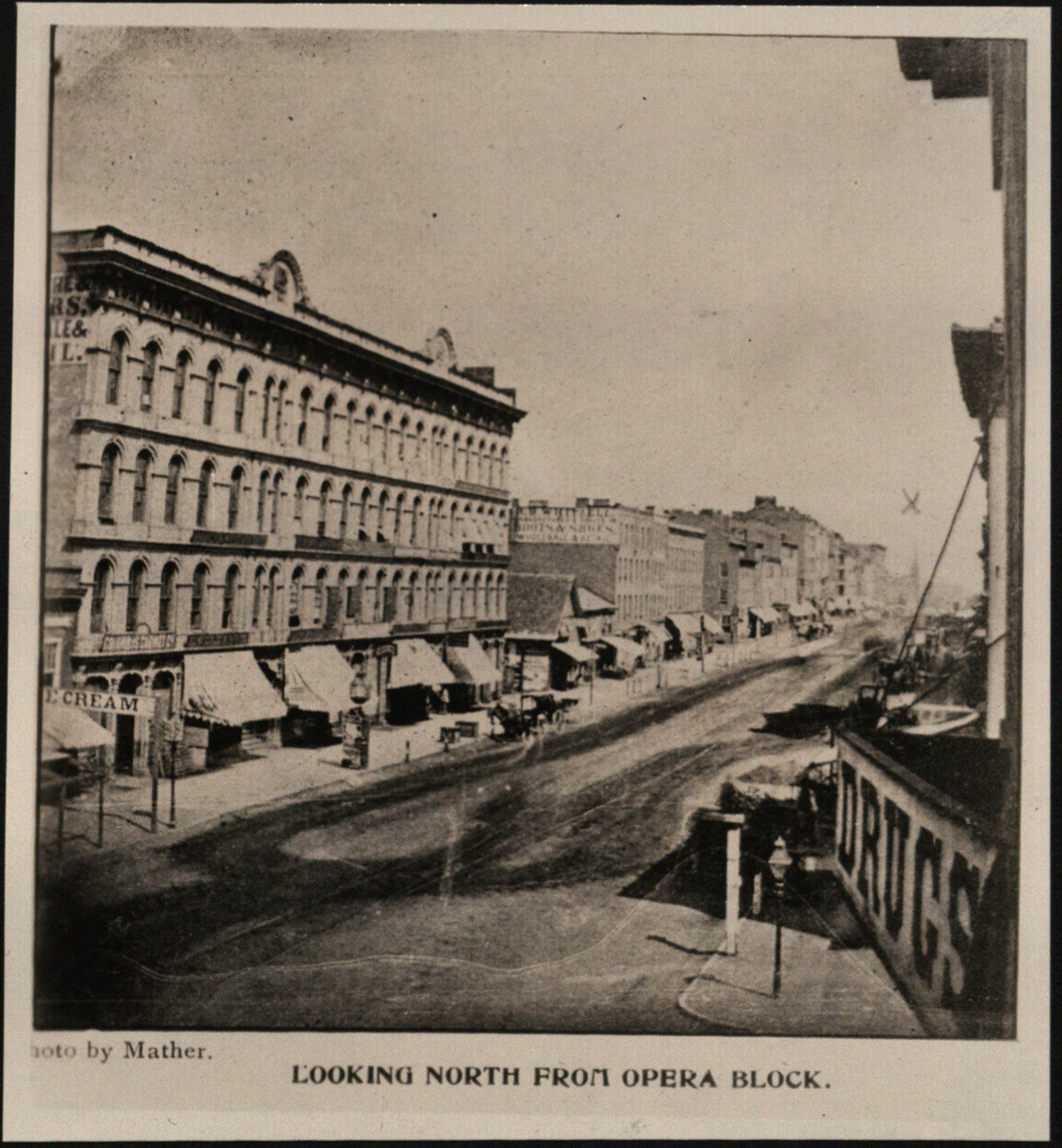
The Metropolitan Opera Block and previous buildings on South High, seen from Rich Street, c. 1898

171–177 S. High Street, known as the Old Lazarus Block, was constructed in the 19th century. In 1858, five-term Columbus mayor George J. Karb was born on the building's third floor. The building was remodeled sometime between 1911 and 1915. In the 1880s, Pfaff & Co. operated at this address, selling gas fixtures, glass, and queensware. In the 1890s, the Columbus Optical Company and Mme. King's, selling hats and bonnets, operated at this address. Columbus Optical Co. was re-established in 1940, operating at 177 or 191 South High from 1965 into 1982, when it was renamed Tuckerman Optical; the brand was almost entirely bought out by LensCrafters in 1994. In 1895, the F. & R. Lazarus Company constructed a large clocktower on top of the building. The Italian Renaissance Revival-style tower reportedly would increase the building's height to 100 feet, and carry 600 electric lights, along with a 1,000-lb. fire bell connected to the city fire department. The clocktower's plans were by the firm of C. A. Stribling, best known for his work in the firm Stribling & Lum, prominent in Central Ohio. Upon installation, the building and its clocktower were heavily adorned with lightbulbs. Together with the electric-lit streetcar arches on High Street, the block became a "miniature white way" every night at that time. In 1909, the Early Motor Car Co. opened in the building. In August 1910, a neighboring building, part of the seven-building Lazarus complex, was torn down for construction of the Ohio National Bank. A few months earlier, Lazarus's clocktower was also demolished. The tower was beloved by locals, and relied on by businesspeople in the area. In 1920, the Republican state headquarters moved into the building, still known as the old Lazarus building. In the 1920s, Korn Hatters operated in the building, and from 1915 to at least 1923, Eddie Gettrost ran a bowling alley, the South High Alleys, in the building. There the Columbus Women's Bowling Association held its first city tournament, in 1922, and continued nearly every year into the 1940s.

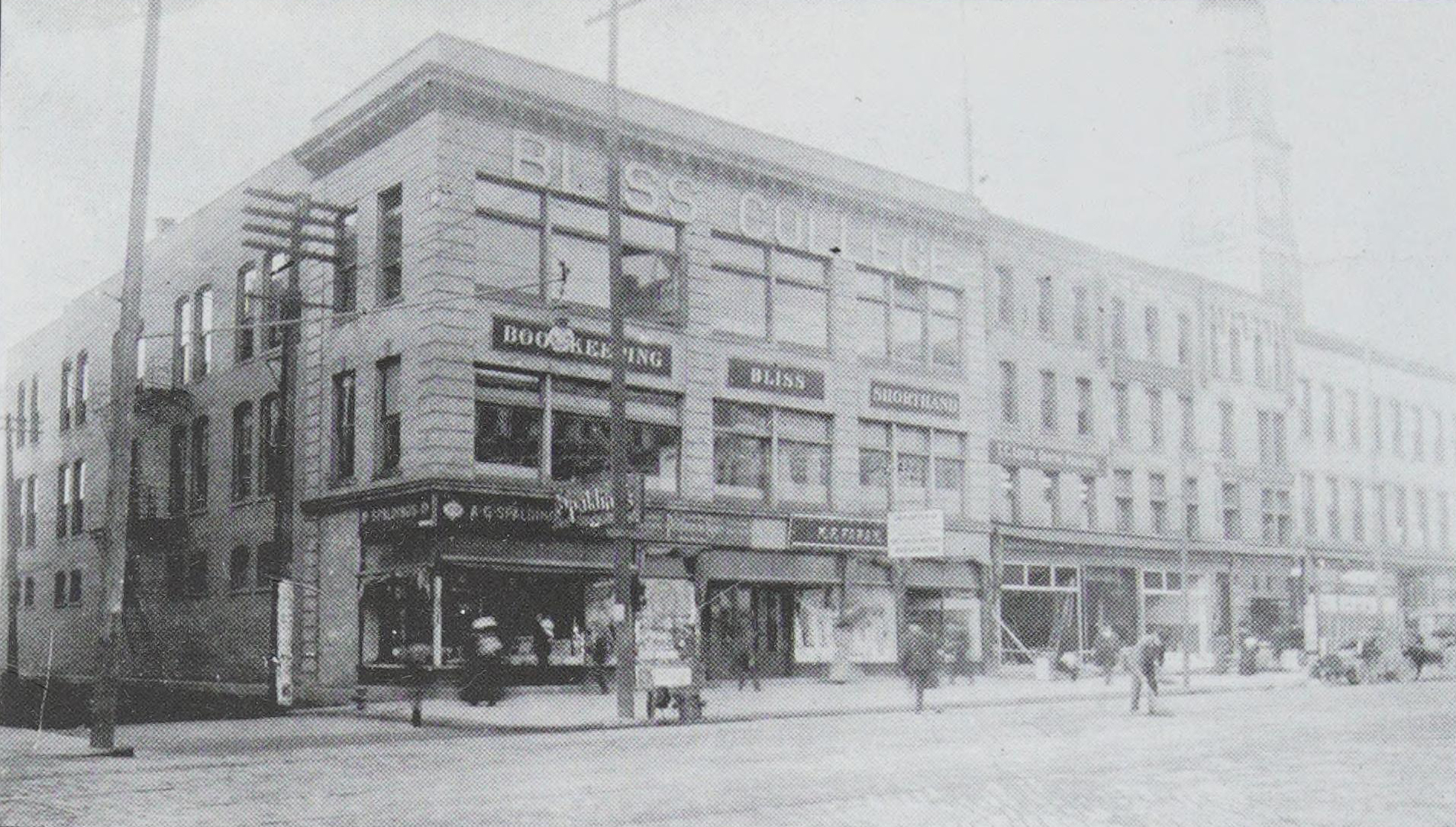
Renovating the old Lazarus store building, 1909

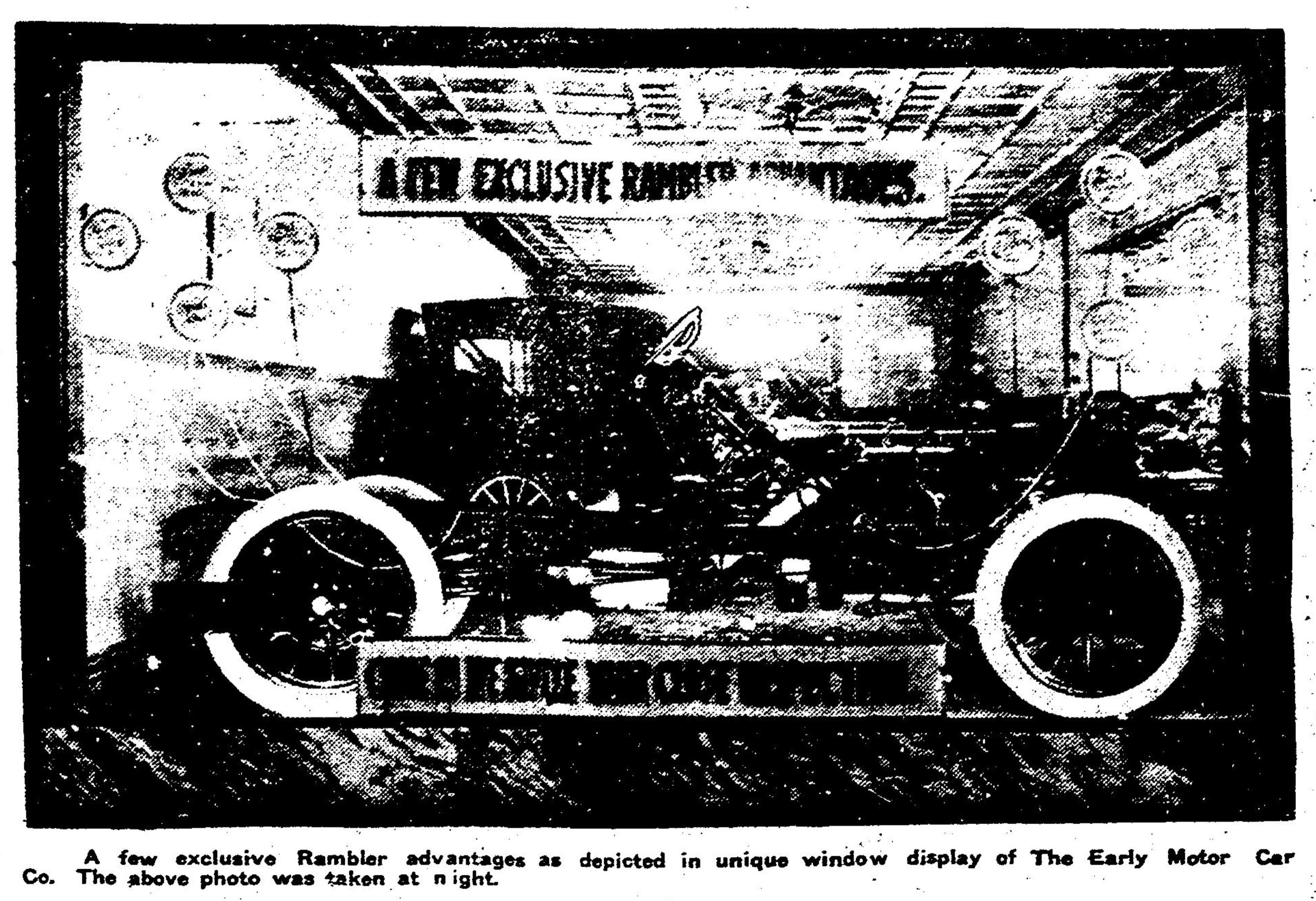
Window display and interior of the Early Motor Car Co., 1911

In July 1931, Kroger announced it would open its first store in Downtown Columbus in the building, in a former Lazarus store space. It was also considered the first supermarket in Columbus. The store, at the address of 177–179 S. High Street, had two exterior entrances, and an entrance from the lobby of 175. Its opening night, on November 7, 1931, reportedly drew in 2,600 people, with 7,205 sales registered that day. The opening was paired with an 18-page section about the new supermarket in The Columbus Dispatch. The new store was described there as "ultra modern", "the latest development in food service", and "one of the finest retail centers" for groceries in the Midwest, and was advertised as "the last word in grocery service". The storefront utilized black vitrolite, with chromium-plated lettering for Kroger in a modern font. The interior, finished in two shades of pea green, had a fountain, luncheonette, fresh fruit, baked goods, and candy, cigarette, and tobacco counters. The store also had meat, fish and game, and delicatessen departments. In 1932, the publication Chain Store Management featured the store for its complete shopping experience, leading a trend toward grocery chains in downtown districts, especially those located near department stores and movie theaters. From 1988 to 2000, the Central Ohio Transit Authority operated a customer service center in the building.

The site of 185–191 S. High Street was known as the Breyfogle corner. It held the Columbus Hotel, also known as the Red Lion Hotel, which Jeremiah Armstrong began operating as early as 1822. The building held the only hotel in Columbus for a time and reportedly stood for over 150 years. The hotel formerly had a balcony at its front, where Martin Van Buren gave a speech as a presidential candidate. The hotel also served as the headquarters of Ohio governors Jeremiah Morrow, Allen Trimble, and Duncan McArthur, and was a frequent stop for William Henry Harrison, Henry Clay, Thomas Ewing, and other public figures. The front of the building was removed in 1850, though the remainder stood in 1892. Some of the businesses operating on the site housed William Schaab's Saloon, advertising fresh oysters every day in 1871, and Bradley Munk & Co., a stove store advertising a "New Process" gas range in 1895.

In February 1905, buildings on the site were set to be torn down and replaced with the Jamison Block; the New Bargain Store at the corner of Walnut and High advertised a sell-out sale, announcing it was being forced to vacate. The new Jamison Block building was planned as a four-story red sandstone and buff brick structure, with designs by Monroe Heath Blake. It was also planned to have the High Street entrance arcade and waiting room for the Scioto Valley Traction Company, which built an interurban train station nearby, facing Front Street. The company's officials abandoned the Jamison Block plans when they realized Columbus was no longer "High Street, Ohio" (a one-street town). The present-day 185–191 S. High Street was constructed in 1906, known as the Jamison Block. One of its significant tenants was the Bliss Business College, a school formerly located in the Grand Theatre on State Street. The college opened in the new building on September 4, 1906; a Columbus Dispatch article that year reported Bliss would have the only business college in the state occupying a building specifically built for its purpose. The building suffered two fires in April 1910. The second fire destroyed the inventory of the A.G. Spalding & Co.'s store, with losses to other tenants including Bliss College, F.H. Siebert's cigar store, Theresa Hermann's millinery, and K.F. Farrah's store selling Syrian goods. Several months after the fire, in October 1910, W.L. Jamison commissioned architect J.A. Jones to design a garage building behind the Jamison Block. The building is still extant at 200 South Wall Street, standing 62 feet (19 m) square, two stories in height.

In 1923, the Jamison Block was sold to the Hi-Walnut Realty Co., and became known as the Hi-Walnut Building. Its storefronts were extensively remodeled in that year; new tenants included Ed Doe's clothing and men's furnishing store, the White Star Restaurant, and a location of the H. H. Butler Stores, a New York City-based clothing store. Beginning in 1929, H. H. Butler's store was leased to Paint Service, Inc., a retail and wholesale distributor of DuPont paints. Storefronts were again remodeled in 1937. In 1939, a fire damaged the Hi-Walnut Building, then containing the Fryes Keno Hall offices on the second floor, with flames spreading into 189 and 191 S. High (the China Store and the Paint Service store). The Kroger store in the neighboring building served coffee and cake to the firefighters who battled the fire. Another fire, in May 1947, damaged 171–179 S. High, still owned by Lazarus. The Harmony Music Shop at 177 S. High and the Modern Youth Shoe Shop at 179 S. High were nearly fully destroyed, with heavy damage to Moskins Credit Clothing at 171 S. High. and offices and shops at 175 S. High.

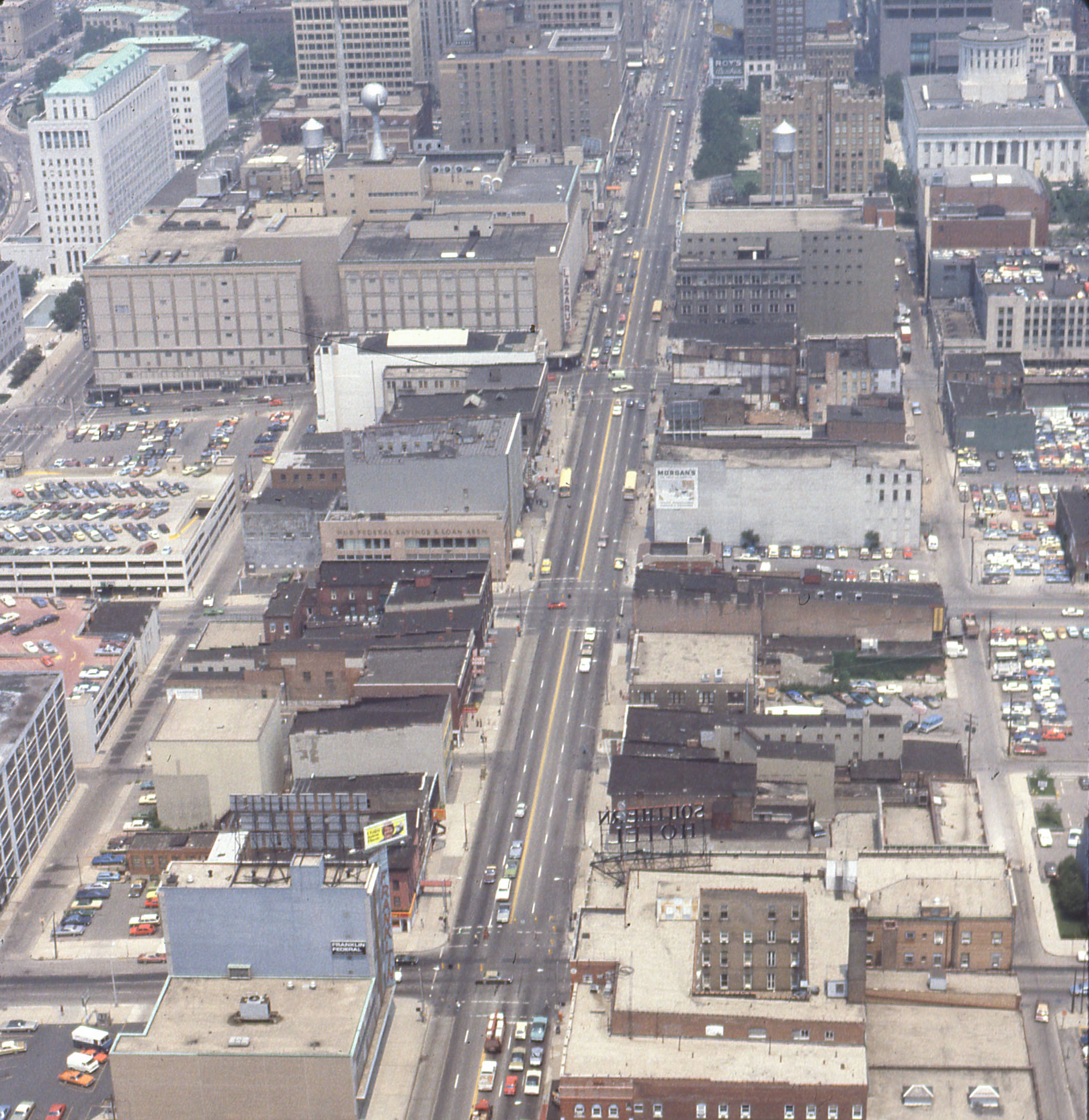
20th century commercial district on South High Street, c. 1977

The buildings were owned by Plaza Properties in recent years. Along with the Ohio National Bank building on the block, the buildings have sat largely vacant, without significant investments or improvements. Their vacancy was highlighted in 2016 as ideal spaces to renovate and use, at a time when companies were beginning to seek historic buildings to operate in. From 2015 to 2023, the buildings were owned by TH Plaza LLC, linked to local developer Larry Ruben and Plaza Properties. During this time, in 2019, the City of Columbus inspected the buildings and declared the structures unsafe, due to issues including water damage, crumbling interior walls, and collapsed floors, requiring repairs, an appeal, a sale of the buildings, or demolition. No issues were reported relating to the buildings' exteriors, which were determined to be in good condition in city inspections in 2011 and 2015. The two remaining businesses there relocated in 2019, leaving the buildings completely vacant. One of these tenants, Moses Jewelers, had operated there for about 20 years, and relocated to another property owned by Plaza Properties. In 2023, the buildings were sold to a Cleveland-based development, investment, and general contractor firm, which plans to demolish the structures and construct a fifteen-story mixed use building on the site. The new structure would include 200 apartments, a 207-space parking garage, and ground-floor retail. The firm also plans to demolish a nearby building and to renovate the neighboring Ohio National Bank building, which is listed on the National Register of Historic Places. The company planned to make a proposal to the Columbus Downtown Commission on April 25 and May 23, 2023. The developer's representatives made their proposal on June 27, where they also requested a vote to demolish the structures, which was tabled pending a more detailed presentation of the redevelopment. The Columbus Landmarks Foundation listed the Old Lazarus Block as an endangered site in the same month, in the 2023 edition of its Most Endangered List.

The buildings are eligible for the National Register under Criterion A, for their association with a multitude of early Columbus retail businesses, and especially as early stores for the significant Ohio-based companies F. & R. Lazarus Company and Kroger. Lazarus operated in Downtown Columbus for 153 years, becoming a cornerstone of the community. The buildings are also eligible under Criterion C, for embodying the early 20th century commercial architecture that was prominent in the blocks stretching from the Ohio Statehouse south into German Village, acting as the near-sole remnant of this once-bustling shopping district.

Old Lazarus Block and neighboring buildings

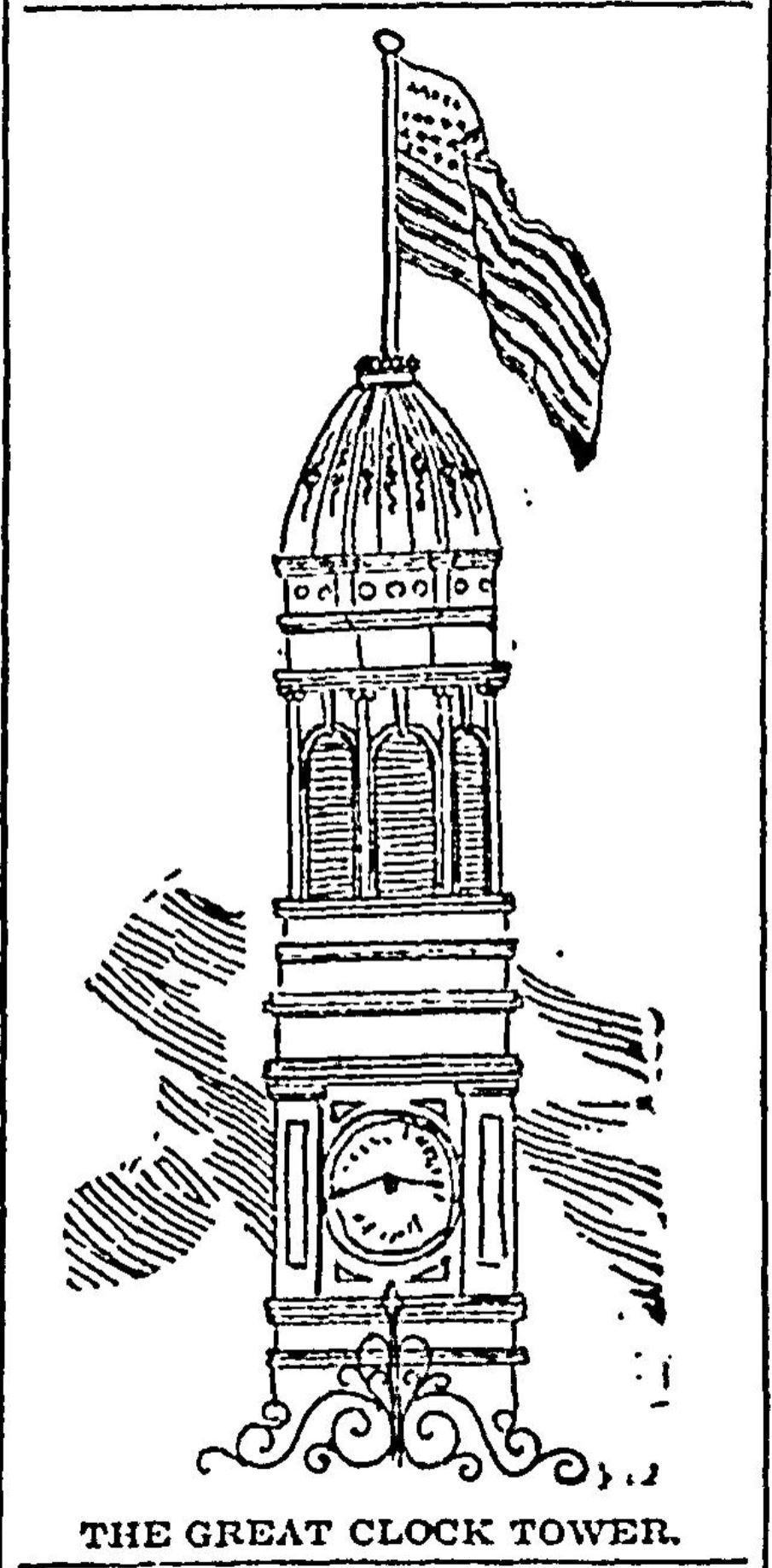
Clock-tower drawing, 1895

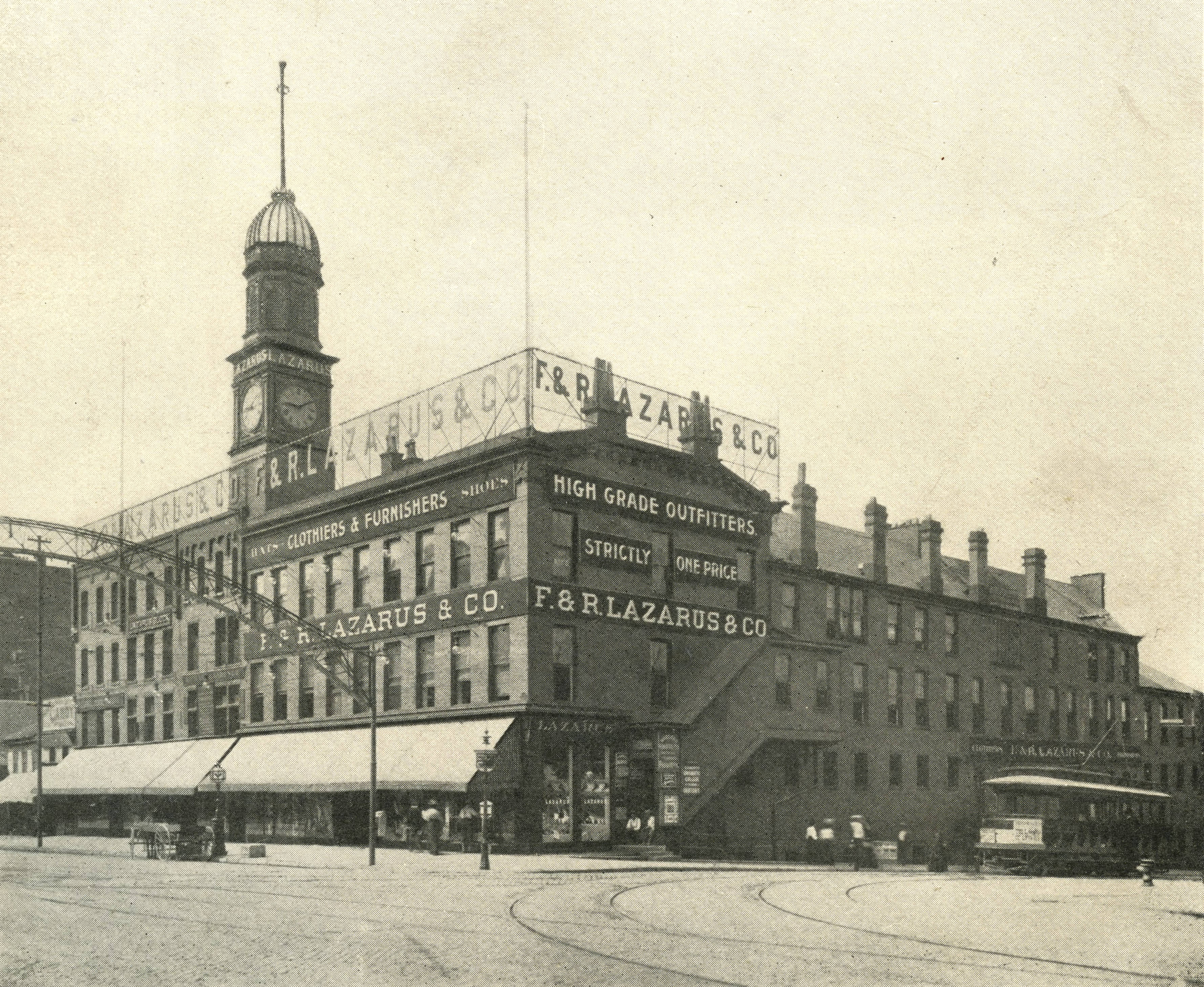
The Lazarus Block in 1901

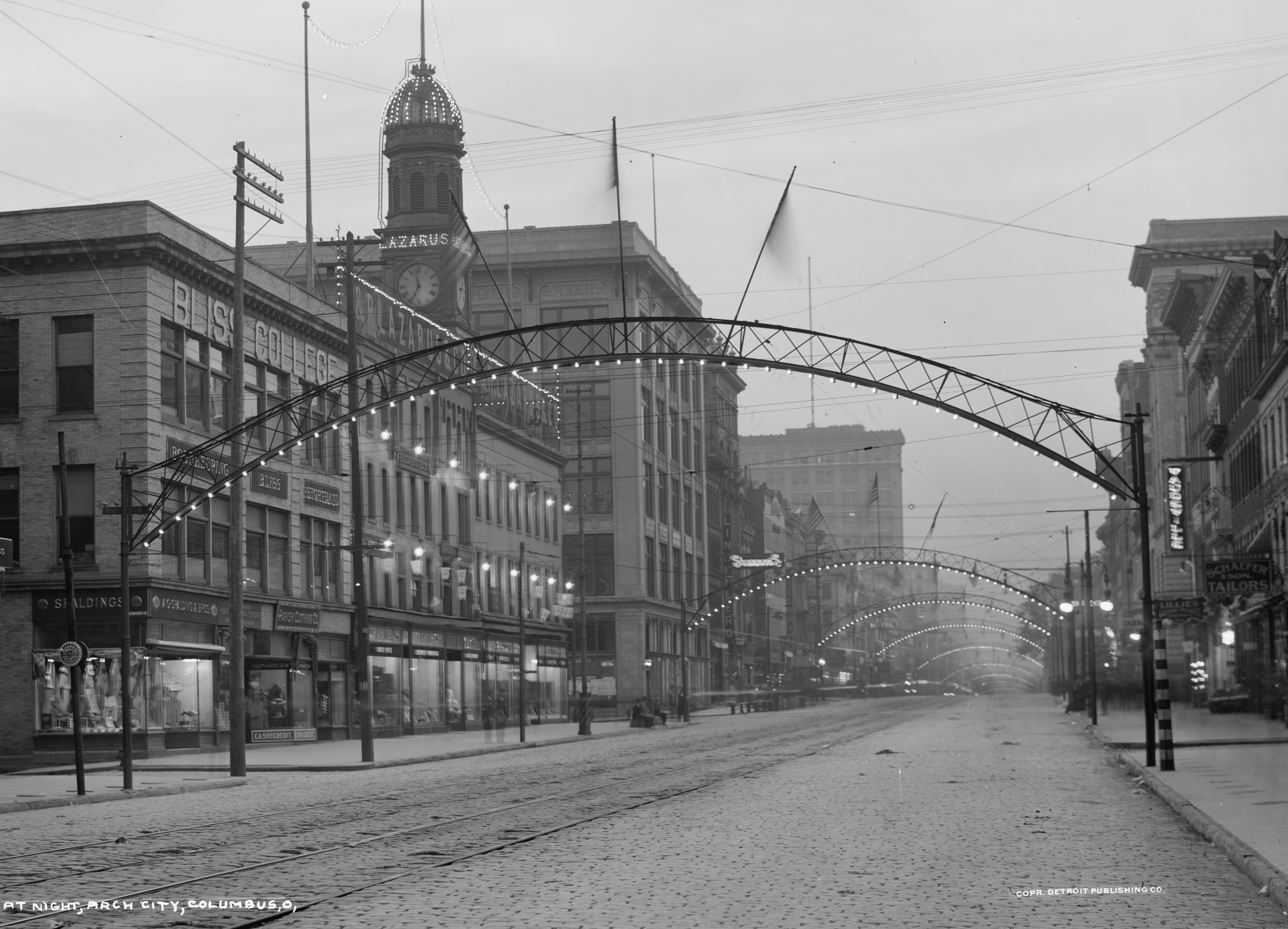
Buildings at 171-191 South High, c. 1909-1910

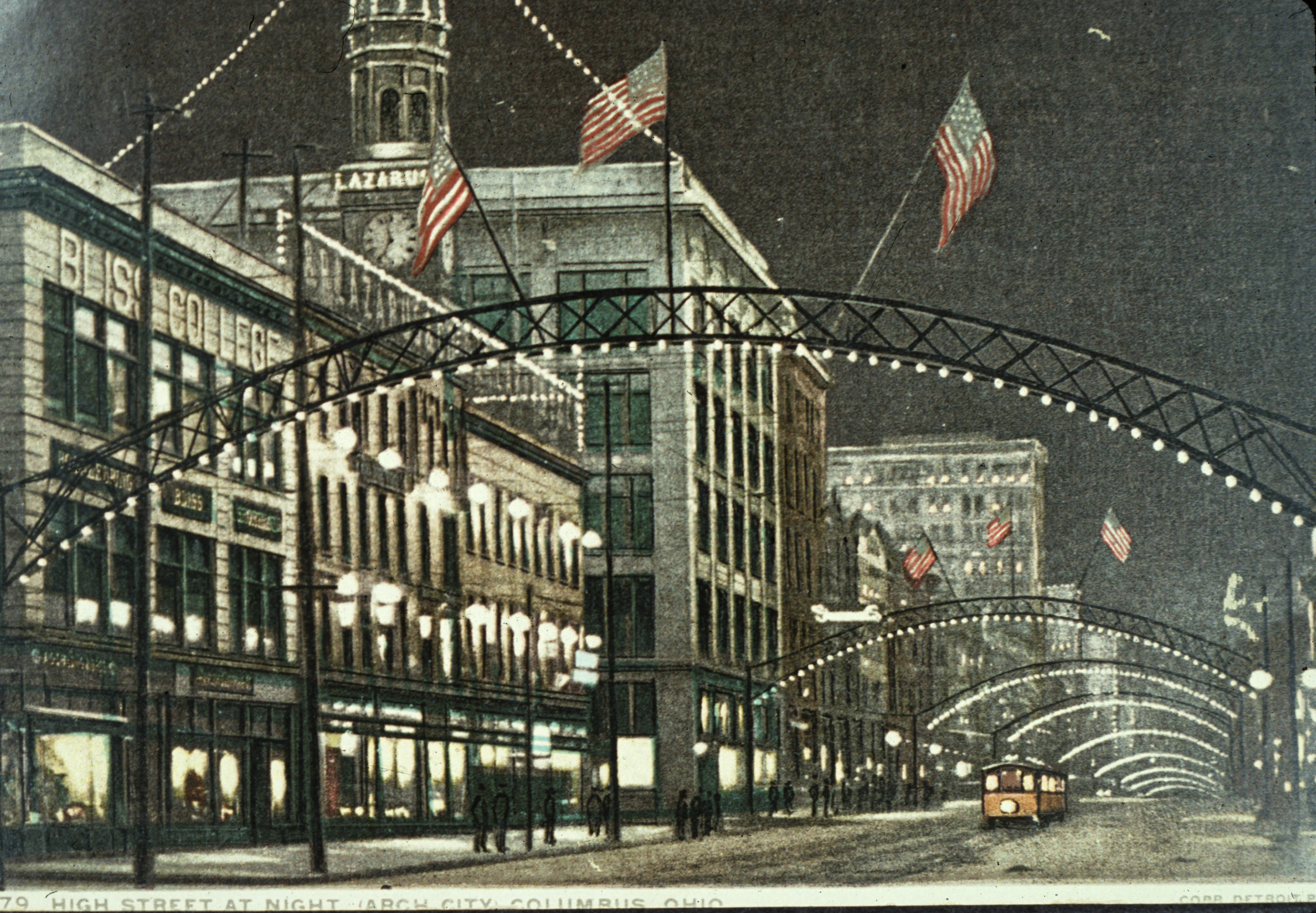
Postcard of 171-191 South High, c. 1909-1910

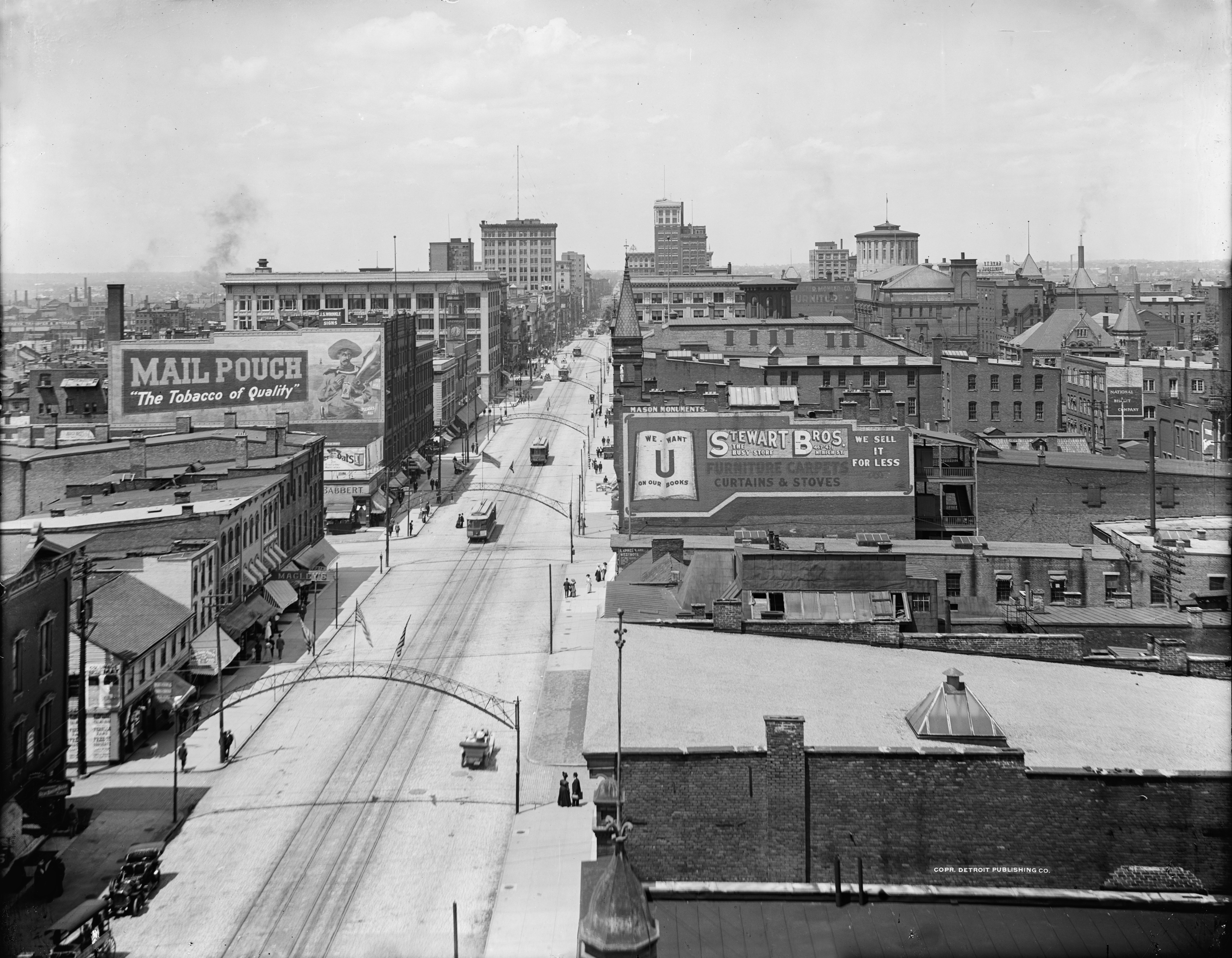
Buildings at 171-191 South High, c. 1909-1910

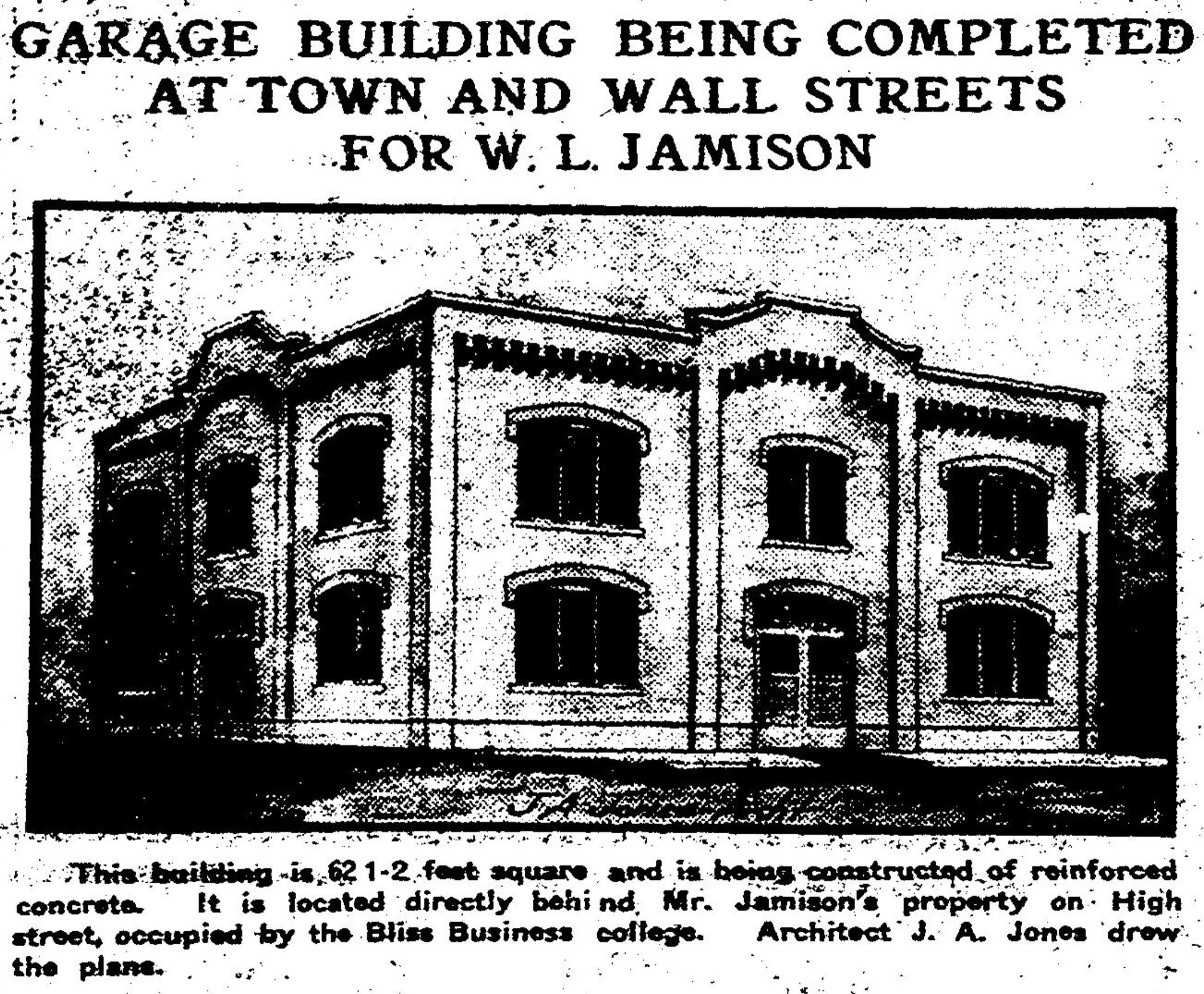
200 South Wall Street design, 1910

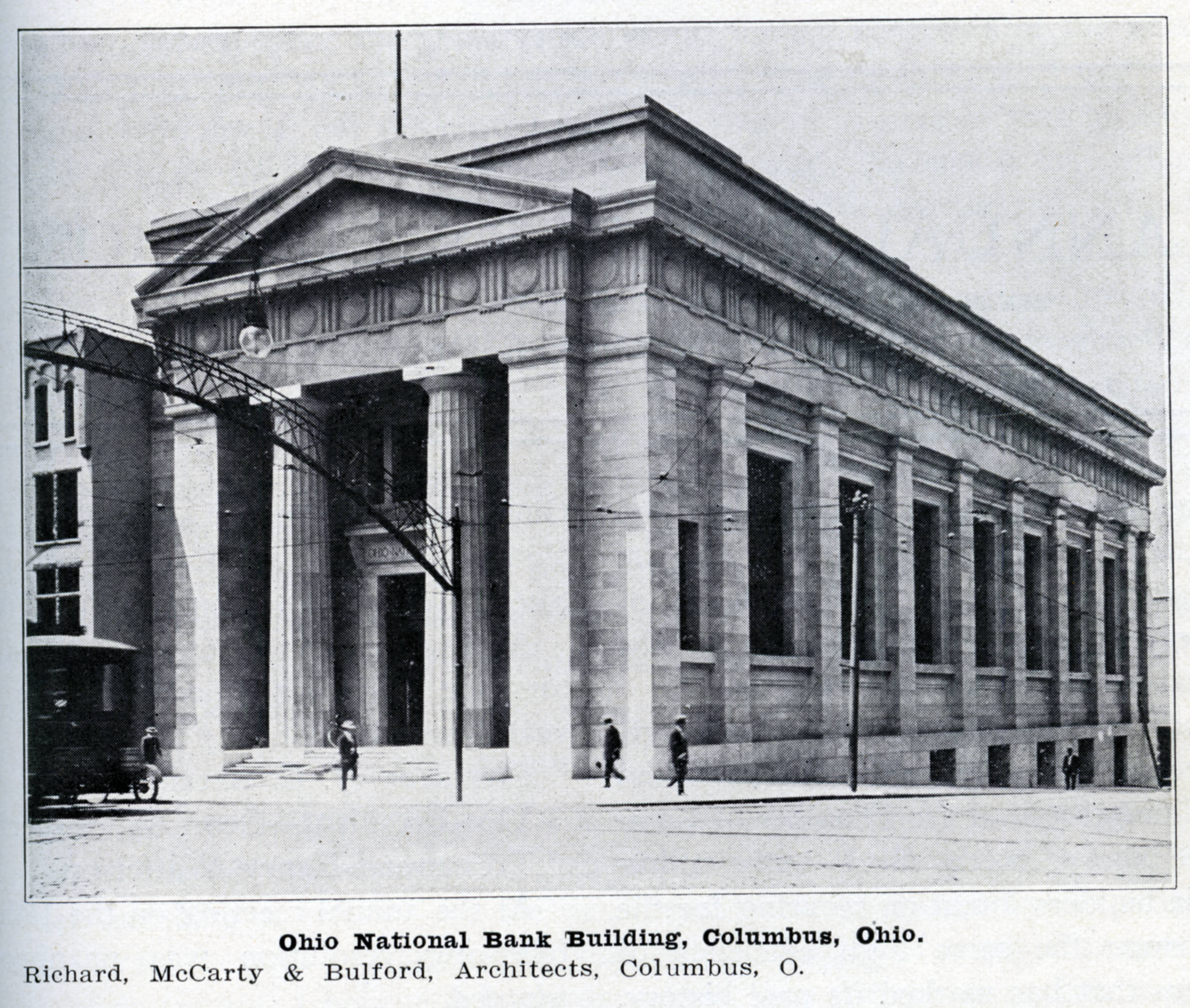
Ohio National Bank beside the remaining Lazarus Block building, 1911
Gradual changes to the commercial blocks, 1887 to 1920

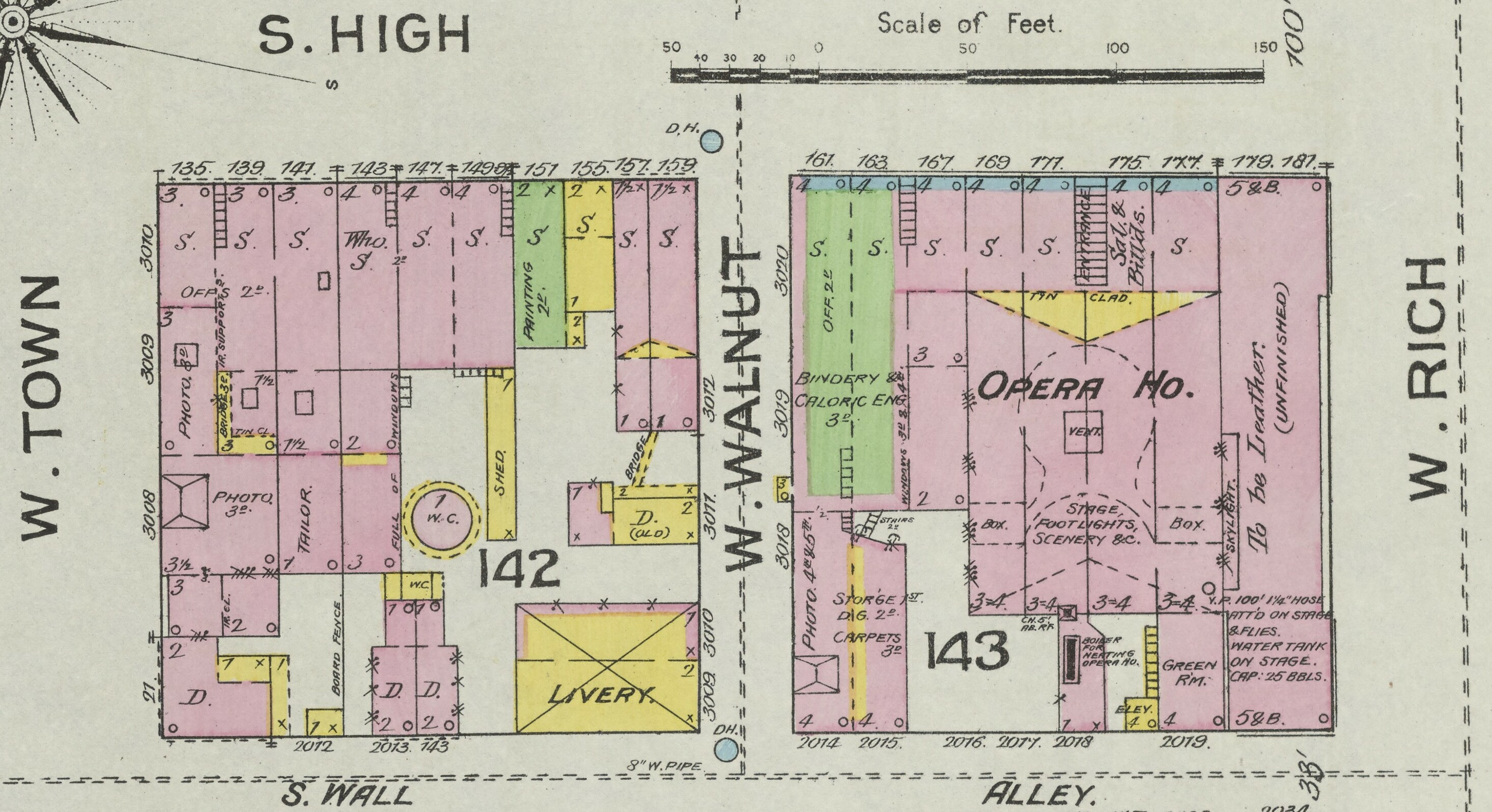
1887

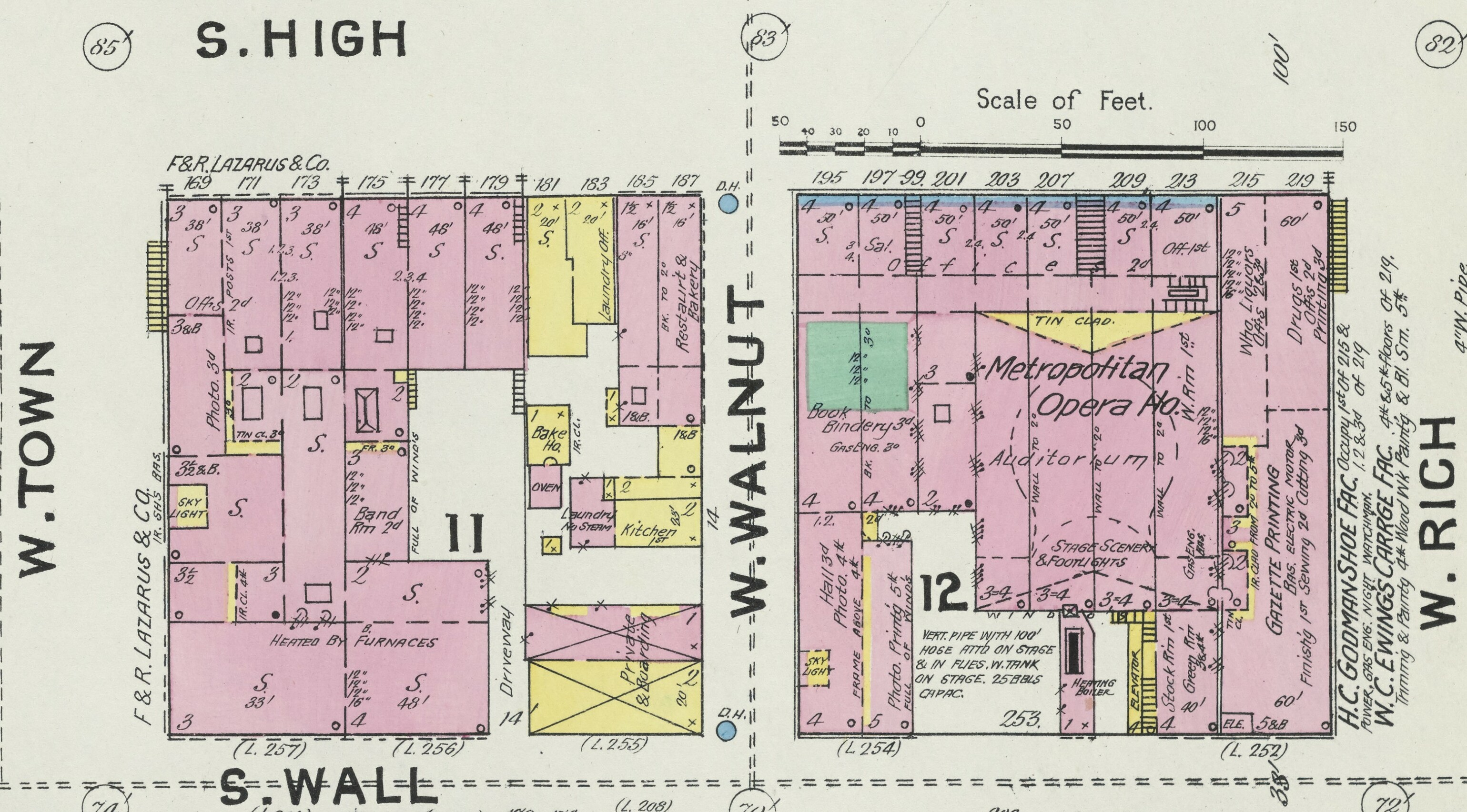
1891

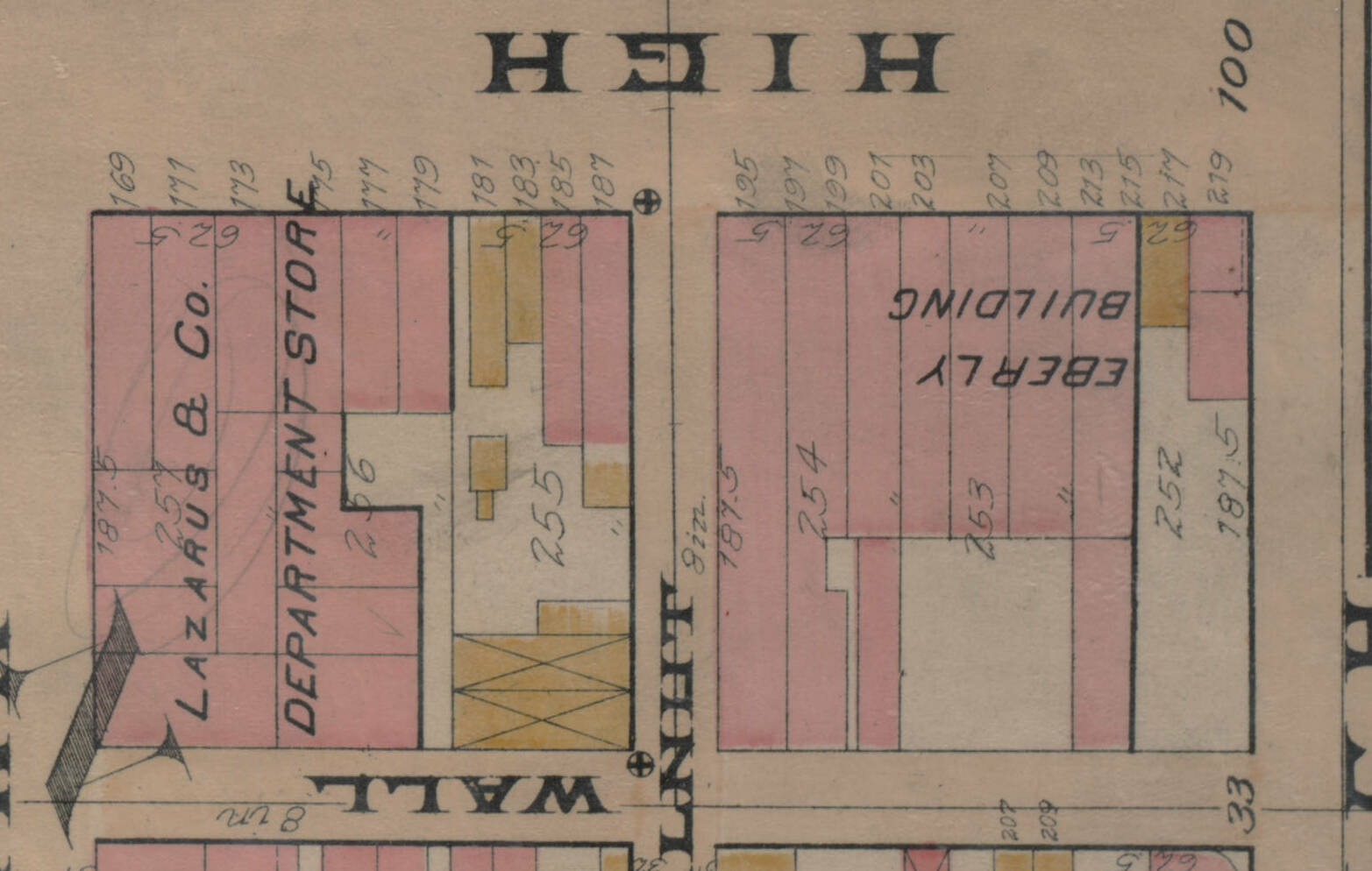
1899

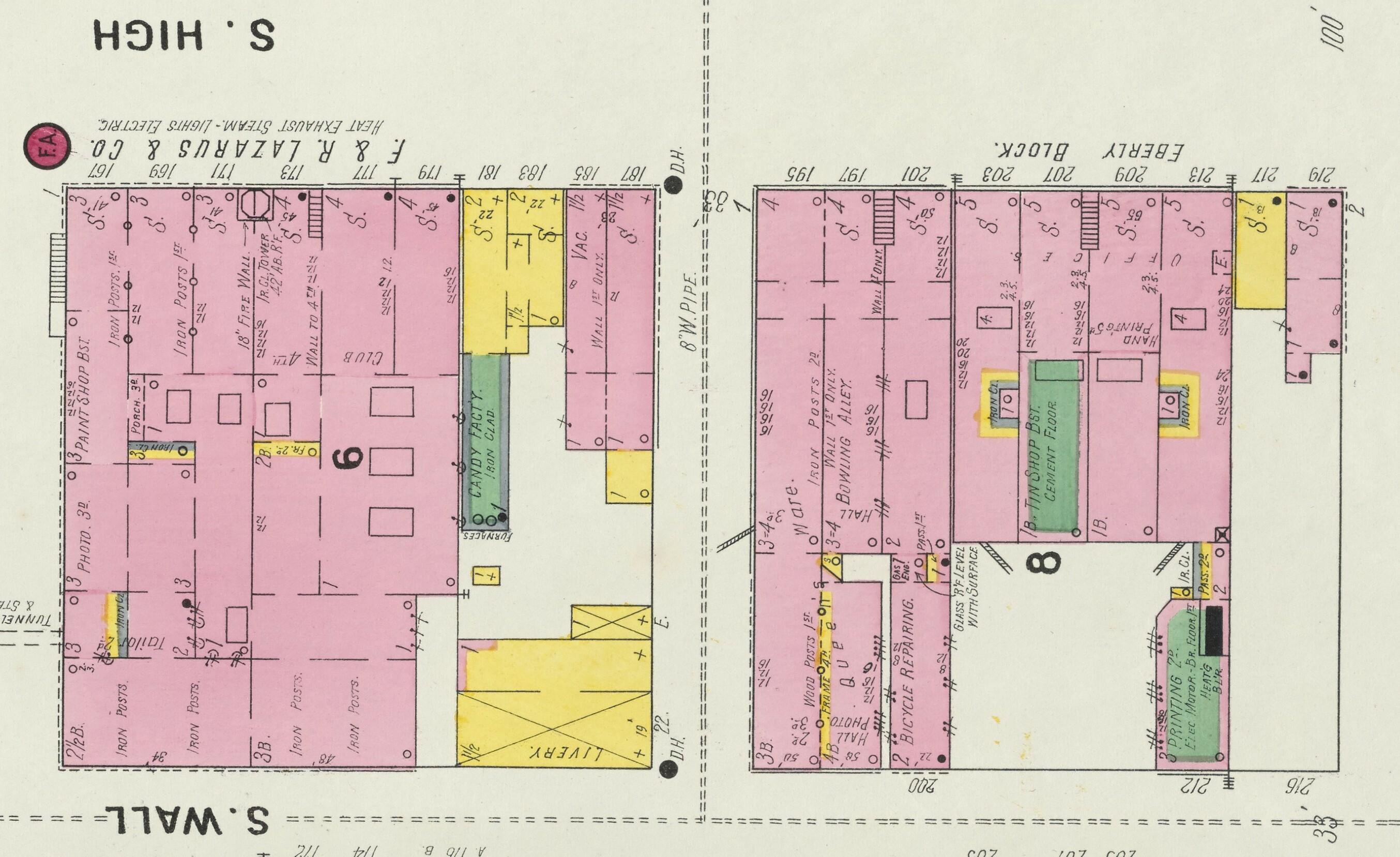
1901

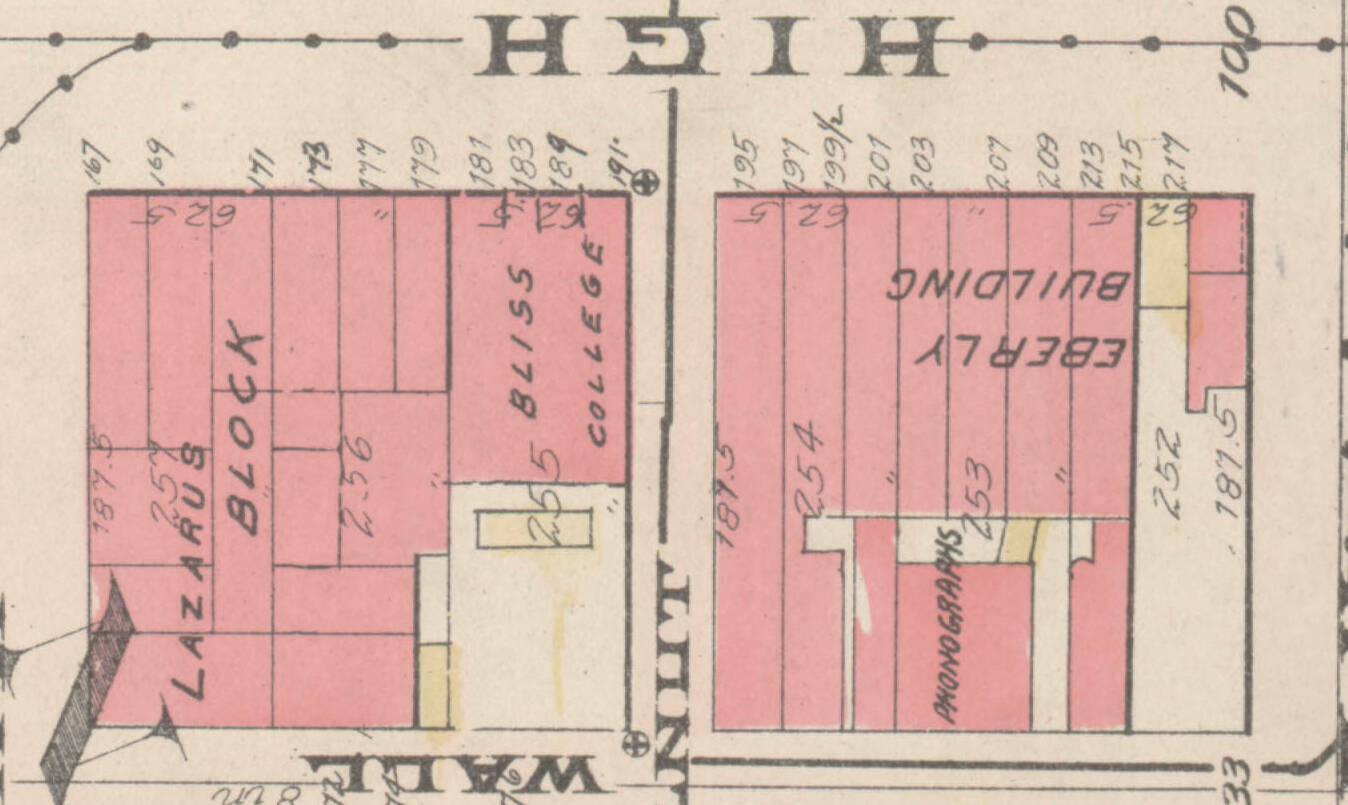
1910

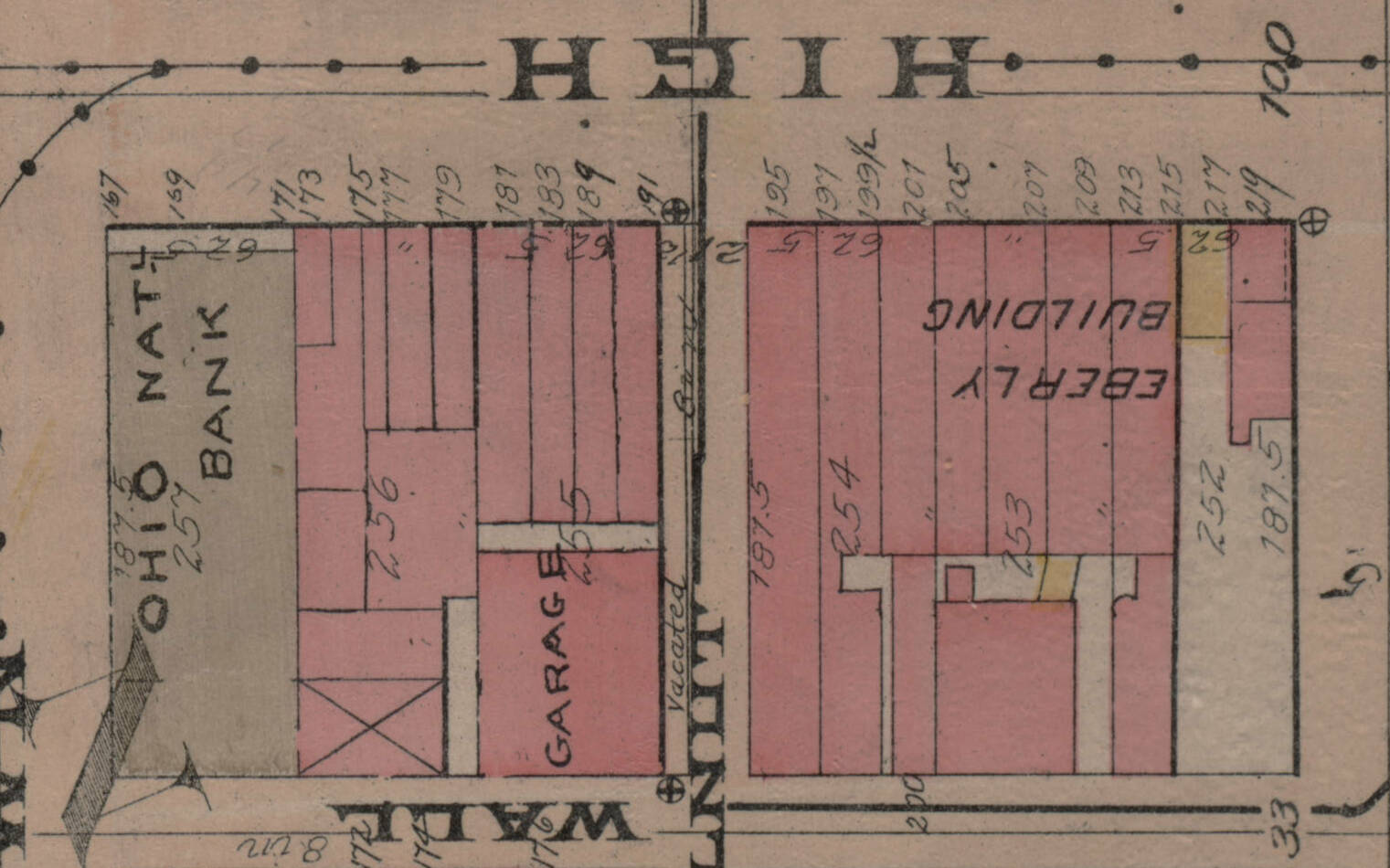
1920
