= Ohio National Bank =

- U.S. National Register of Historic Places
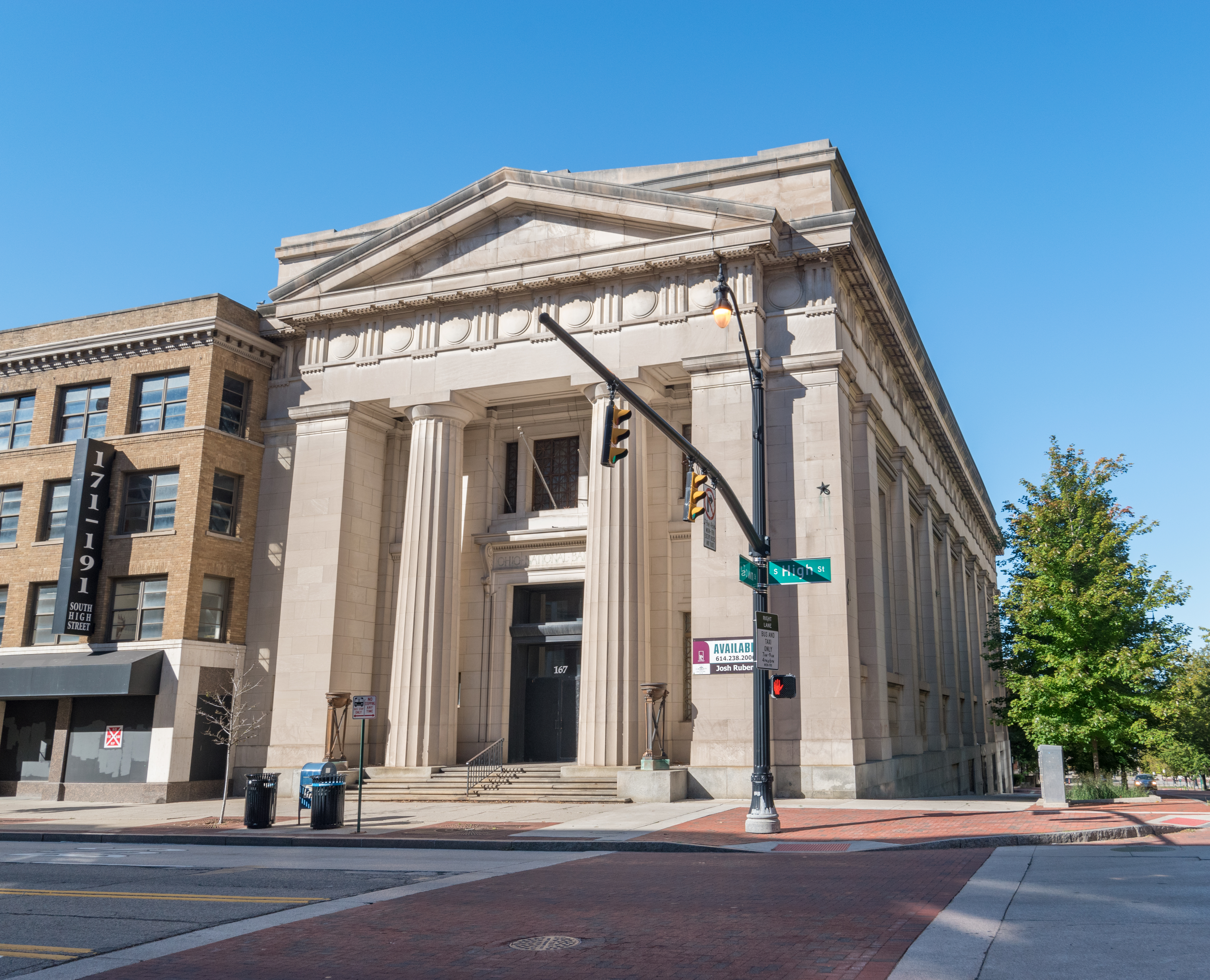
- Interactive map highlighting the building's location
- Location: 167 S. High Street, Columbus, Ohio
- Coordinates: 39.95855°N 83.00050°W
- Built: 1911
- Architect: Richards, McCarty & Bulford
- Architectural style: Neoclassical
- NRHP reference No.: 80003002
- Added to NRHP: November 26, 1980

The Ohio National Bank building is a historic structure in Downtown Columbus, Ohio. The Neoclassical building was designed by Richards, McCarty & Bulford, built in 1911, and largely remains as built. It was a long-term location for the Ohio National Bank. It was listed on the National Register of Historic Places in 1980, noted as one of the most significant examples of Greek Doric classical ornamentation in Columbus, with refined details throughout the building.

== Attributes ==
The building is made of brick and faced entirely in stone. Its front features two stone columns in the Doric order, five feet in diameter, as well as two immense stone pilasters. The building was originally to feature a marble High Street facade and a semi-dome with a large skylight. The interior is predominantly a two-story banking lobby, with a coffered ceiling and elaborate ornamentation.

== History ==
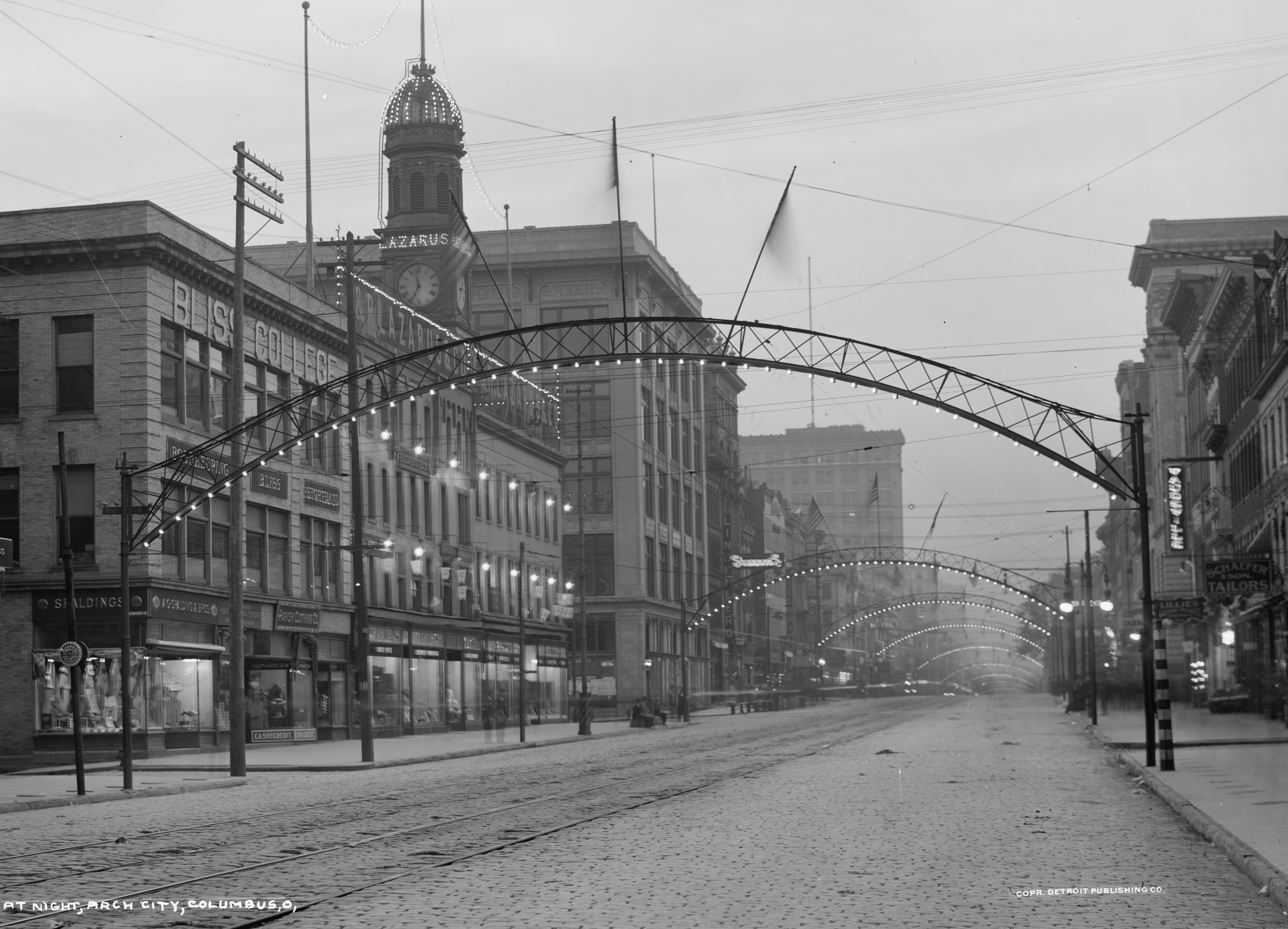
The old Lazarus Block (left), c. 1906-1909

The building was conceived by the Ohio National Bank. In January 1910, its directors decided to build an exclusive bank building, after considering constructing a skyscraper. The bank hired architects Richards, McCarty & Bulford to design the structure, which would replace the old Lazarus Block, and resemble the architecture of the nearby Ohio Statehouse. The building plans were approved by the city in August 1910. Around that time, contractor Henry Lauer began demolition of the old Lazarus Building, formerly on the site. Its distinctive clocktower was removed in June 1910, to the dismay of residents and businesspeople of the area. The bank building opened for business on November 27, 1911.

From 1912 to 1923, the building housed the administrative offices and school library of the Columbus Public School District. The offices and library moved from the nearby Columbus Public School Library building, which had been damaged beyond repair in 1912. In 1923, the library and offices moved into the Sullivant School, and its former spaces in the bank building were remodeled by Richards, McCarty & Bulford.

In 2023, the building and others on its block were sold to Harsax Management Company, which plans to demolish several on the site.

Gallery

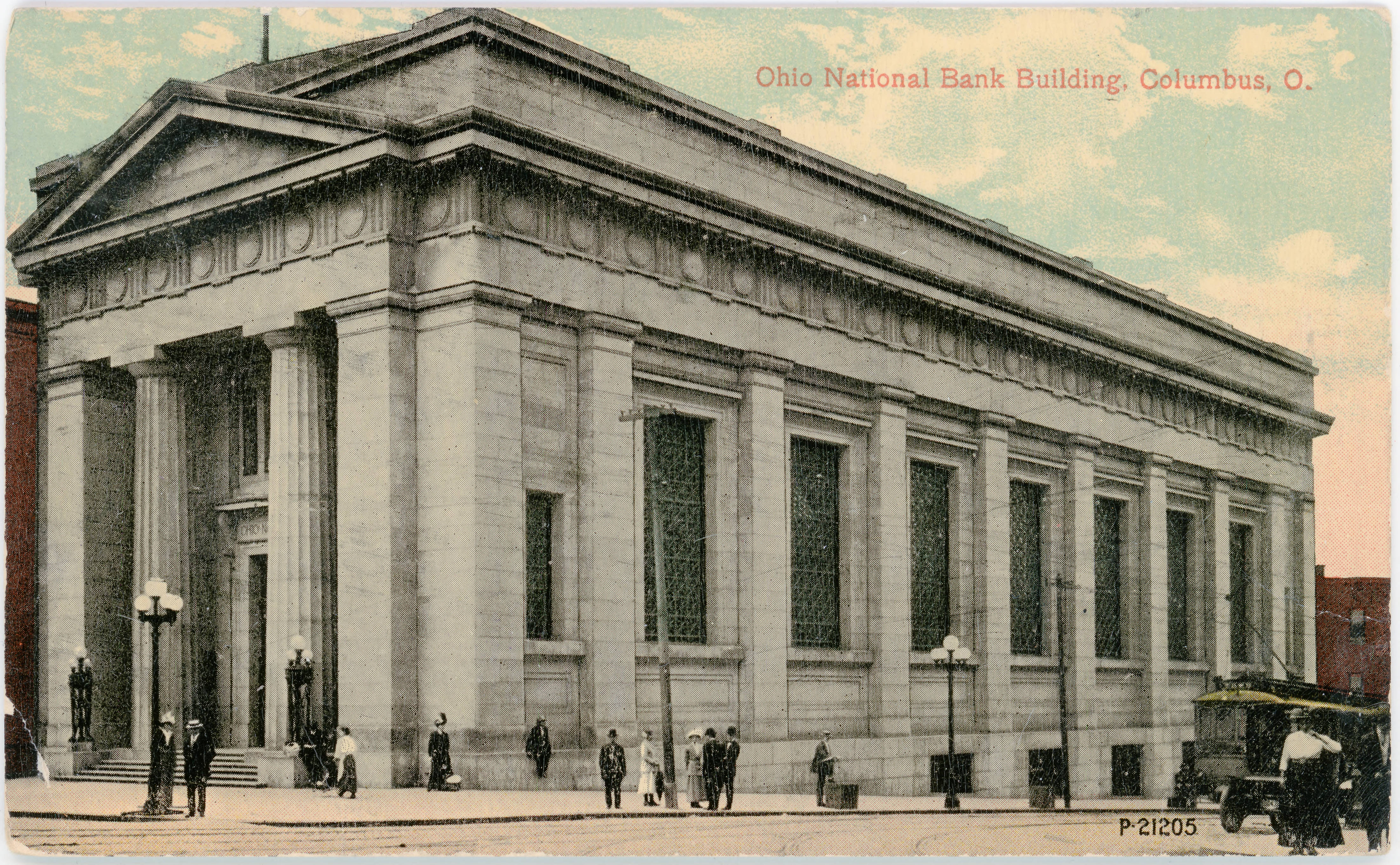
Early postcard featuring the building

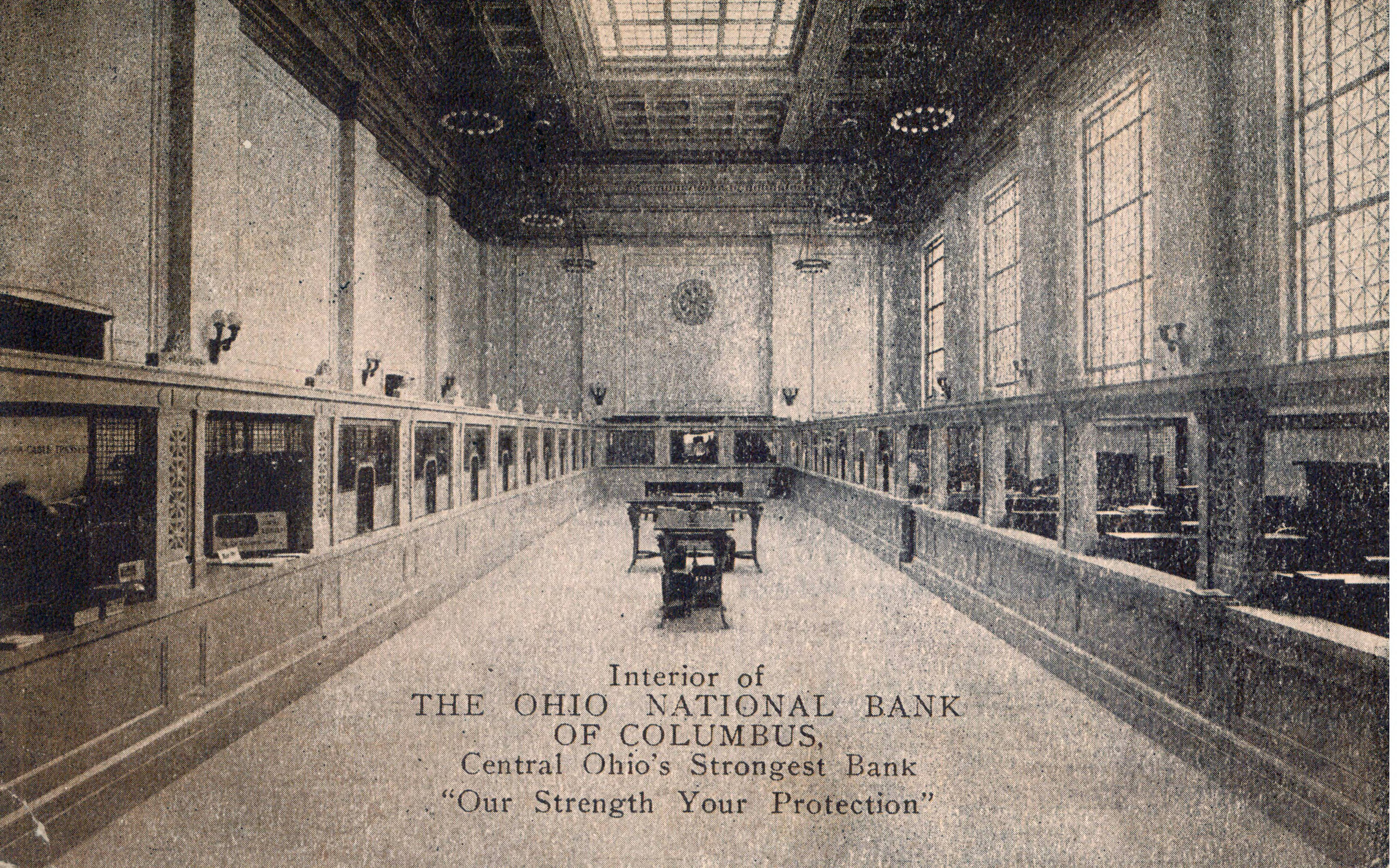
Interior view postcard, facing west

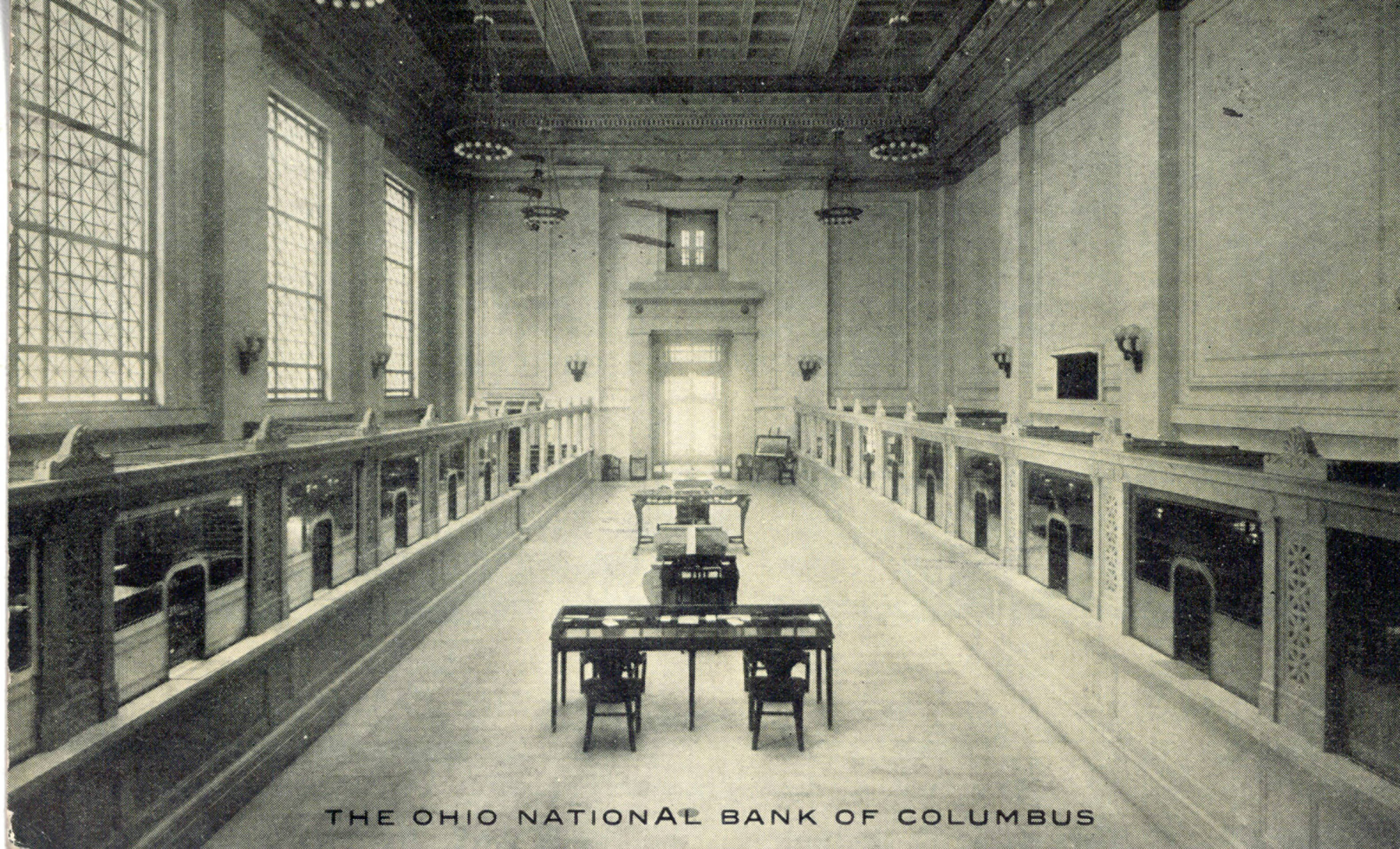
Interior view postcard, facing east

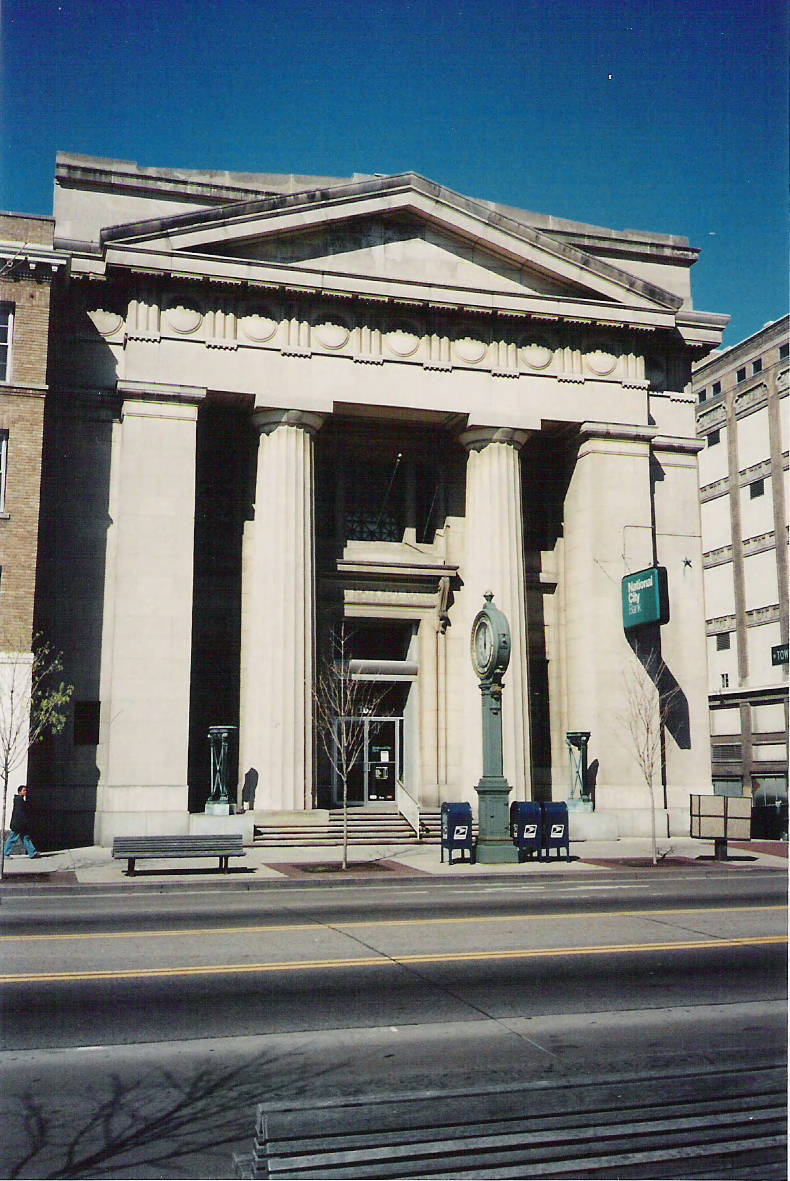
As a National City Bank branch, 1999

== See also ==
- 171-191 South High Street
- National Register of Historic Places listings in Columbus, Ohio
