= Columbus Neighborhoods =

Documentary series about Columbus, Ohio

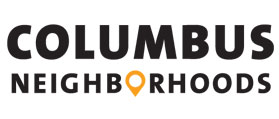
- Created by: WOSU Public Media
- Country of origin: United States
- No. of seasons: 6
- No. of episodes: 116

Production
- Executive producer: Brent Davis
- Running time: 26 minutes (54-58 in seasons 1-2)

Original release
- Release: March 2010

Columbus Neighborhoods is a documentary television series produced by WOSU Public Media, a part of PBS. The series premiered in 2010 as a set of one-hour shows about historic neighborhoods in Columbus, Ohio.

== Attributes ==
In addition to television episodes, the Columbus Neighborhoods project involves a website, educational materials for classrooms, community storytelling events, and town-hall forums. The initiative was the largest local project undertaken by the station at its inception.

The show is hosted by Charlene Brown and Javier Sanchez.

== History ==
The series was initially to air in fall 2008. The first program in the series was on the Short North and areas around it: Victorian Village, Italian Village, Harrison West and Flytown. In December 2009, it was reported that the series was now set to air in celebration of the city's bicentennial in 2012. Preparations for the show involved numerous neighborhood meetings, videotaped interviews, and invitations for local residents to submit stories, old videos, and photographs. In March 2010, the first episode finally aired, as the first of initially only six episodes.

In 2013, at the end of Columbus's bicentennial year, a copy of the first season of Columbus Neighborhoods was placed along with other items into a time capsule. The capsule was placed at 77 North Front Street, and will be opened around the time of the tricentennial, in 2112.

== Episodes ==
Episodes include:

=== Season 1 ===
56- to 58-minute episodes:

1. The Short North
2. German Village
3. King-Lincoln
4. Downtown-Franklinton
5. University District
6. Olde Towne East

=== Season 2 ===
54- to 57-minute episodes:

1. South Side
2. Clintonville
3. Worthington
4. Bexley
5. Tri-Village (Grandview Heights, Marble Cliff, and Upper Arlington)
6. New Americans

=== Season 3 ===
26-minute episodes:

1. The Evolution of Preservation
2. Civil War Stories
3. Gathering Places
4. Ghost Stories and Halloween Traditions
5. Columbus' Influence on Aviation History
6. Central Ohio Veterans
7. Central Ohio's Ancient History
8. Central Ohio Food and Industry
9. Downtown Columbus
10. The Creative Community of Central Ohio
11. Columbus Music
12. Small Businesses and Humble Beginnings
13. Family and Community History
14. Education in Columbus
15. Columbus Public Institutions
16. Columbus Migrations
17. Unique Neighborhoods
18. Early Entertainment in Columbus
19. Activism in Columbus
20. Evolving Neighborhoods
21. Columbus by Rail
22. Heading East
23. Local Hangouts
24. New Americans
25. Dublin
26. Active History

=== Season 4 ===
26-minute episodes:

1. Columbus and the Vietnam War Part 1
2. Columbus and the Vietnam War Part 2
3. Entertainment in Columbus
4. Halloween in Columbus
5. Chasing the Dream: Getting Ahead in Columbus
6. Columbus and World War I
7. Columbus' Railroad History
8. Columbus Food and Industry
9. Central Ohio Activism
10. Get the Picture: Columbus in Photographs
11. Creative Spaces
12. Retail Columbus
13. Living History
14. Renovating Columbus
15. Columbus on the Move
16. Gathering Places in Central Ohio
17. Architecture in Central Ohio
18. Spirituality in Columbus
19. Breaking Barriers
20. Lancaster, Ohio
21. Innovators
22. Education in Central Ohio
23. Uncovering the History of Milo-Grogan
24. Aging in Columbus
25. Getting Down to Business: Columbus Entrepreneurs
26. Westerville

=== Season 5 ===
26-minute episodes:

1. Columbus Writ Large
2. Columbus Sports
3. Fall in Central Ohio
4. Central Ohio Cemeteries
5. Linden
6. Military
7. Getting Outdoors
8. Food and Industry in Columbus
9. Columbus Activism
10. Central Ohio Retail
11. Columbus Gathering Places
12. Preserving Columbus History
13. Entertaining Columbus
14. Grove City
15. Columbus Architecture
16. Education
17. Mount Vernon
18. Record Keeping
19. Preservation
20. Villains of Columbus
21. Ancient Connections
22. Small Neighborhoods
23. Intergenerational Living
24. Notable Women of Columbus
25. Columbus Railroads
26. Helping Hands

=== Season 6 ===
26-minute episodes:

1. Preserving History
2. The Rural Side of Life
3. Lost History
4. Cemeteries
5. Halloween
6. Military Camps
7. Food & Industry
8. 100th Episode!
9. Going Big
10. Somewhere There's Music
11. Preservation Activists
12. Where Are They Now?
13. Architects
14. In the Air
15. We Made That!
16. Southbound!
17. Celebrating Women
18. Up North
19. Preservation DIY
20. On the Canal!
21. Capturing History
22. Marching Across Ohio
23. A Celebration of New American Food
24. Underground Railroad
25. The Circus Comes To Town
26. The Ohio State University Sesquicentennial

=== Season 7 ===
26-minute episodes:

1. West Side
2. Family
3. Remembering Our Ancestors
4. Spooky Ohio
5. Connections To The Land
6. Rush Creek Village
7. Getting Around With Darbee
8. The Collectors
9. Americana In Ohio
10. Historic Ohio Food Establishments
11. Education Reimagined
12. The Connectors
13. Tribute To A Prolific Ohio Historian
14. Columbus Pastimes
15. Ohio History Connection
16. Looking To Columbus' Past
17. Before They Were Parking Lots
18. Little cities of Black Diamonds
19. Overcoming Challenges
20. Stories From The 19th Century
21. Downtown Columbus
22. Local Crafts
23. Asian Americans in Columbus
24. What Local Artifacts Tell Us
25. Our Neighbors To The North
26. Unique Homes and Gardens
