= Jeffers Mound =

Burial mound in Worthington, Ohio named after Herman Plesenton Jeffers

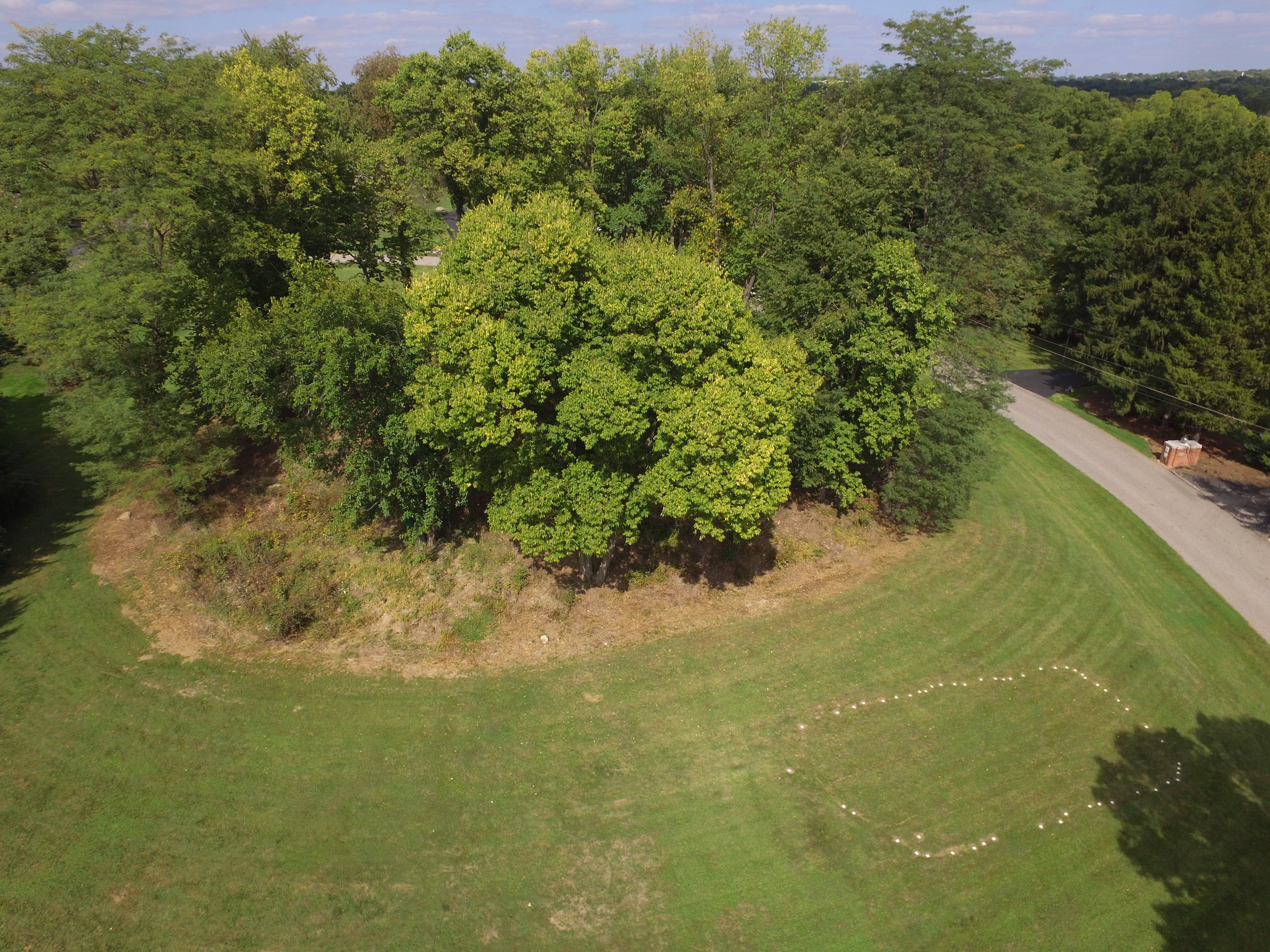
- Aerial view of Jeffers Mound
- Interactive map of Jeffers Mound
- 40.092511°N 83.039378°W
- Location: Worthington, Ohio, U.S.

History
- Original use: Tumulus (burial mound)

Site notes
- Owner: Worthington Historical Society

Jeffers Mound is a Hopewell tradition Native American burial mound in Worthington, Ohio. The mound is all that remains of the ceremonial Worthington Earthworks site built between 100 B.C. and 400 A.D. The mound is named after Herman Plesenton Jeffers, who owned the land the mound is situated on before its transfer to the Worthington Historical Society.

Ownership of the site has changed since the early 1800s. In 1804, William Vining purchased 203 acres of land known today as the Plesenton subdivision, which included the site of Jeffers Mound. The area was farmed for decades, resulting in the degradation of the site's smaller mounds. In 1921, Herman Plesenton Jeffers purchased the Plesenton subdivision and made plans for the area to be developed - however, the area around Jeffers Mound was excluded from development. Finally, in 1974, the Herman Plesenton Jeffers Trust donated the site to the Worthington Historical Society for its preservation.

Near Jeffers Mound is a set of markers that reveal the footprint of a previously existing rectangular structure.

Jeffers Mound was placed on the National Register of Historic Places in 1974, the same year that the site was donated to the Worthington Historical Society. The site has also been designated as a Remarkable Ohio historical site by Ohio History Connection, Ohio's historical society.

== Gallery ==
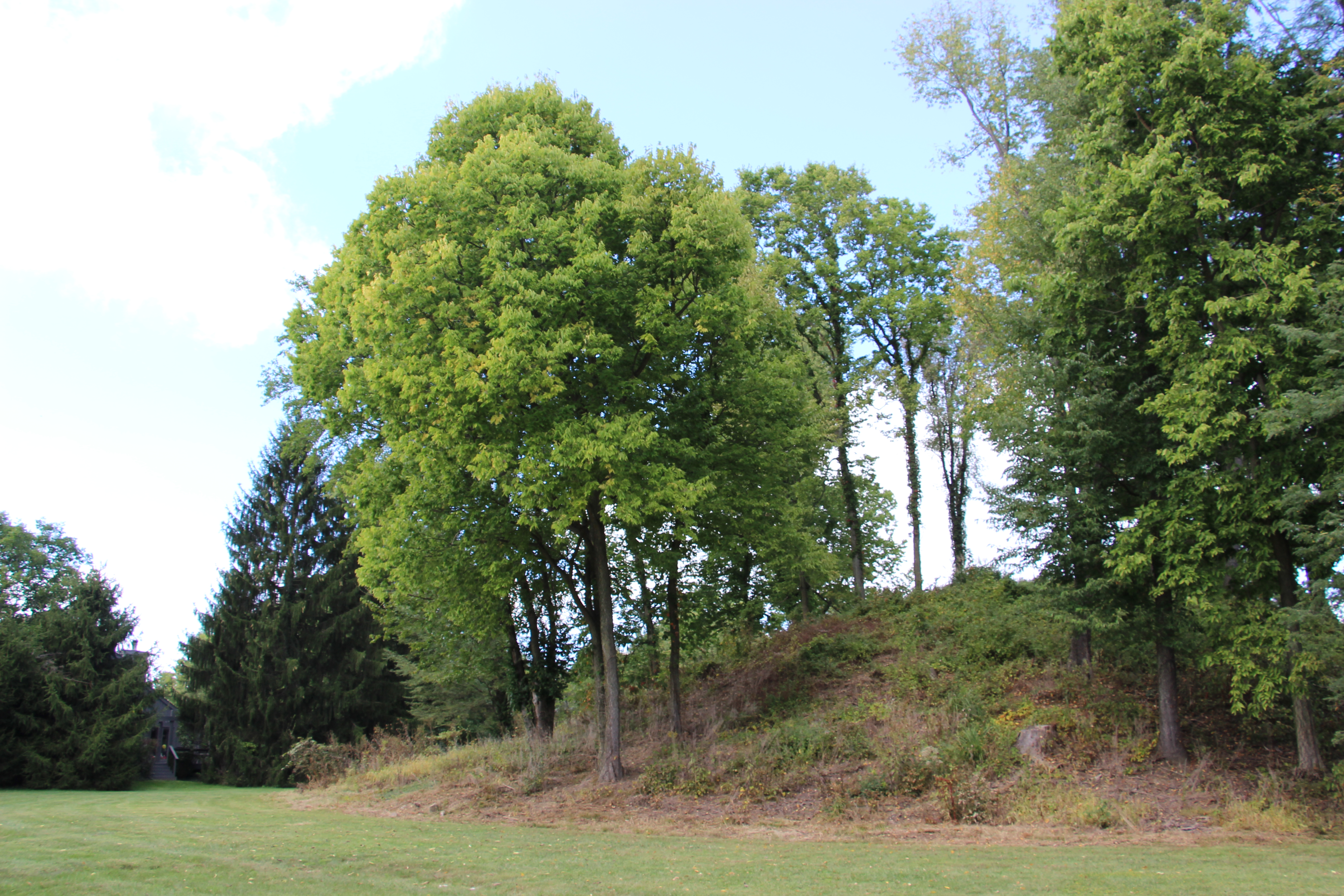

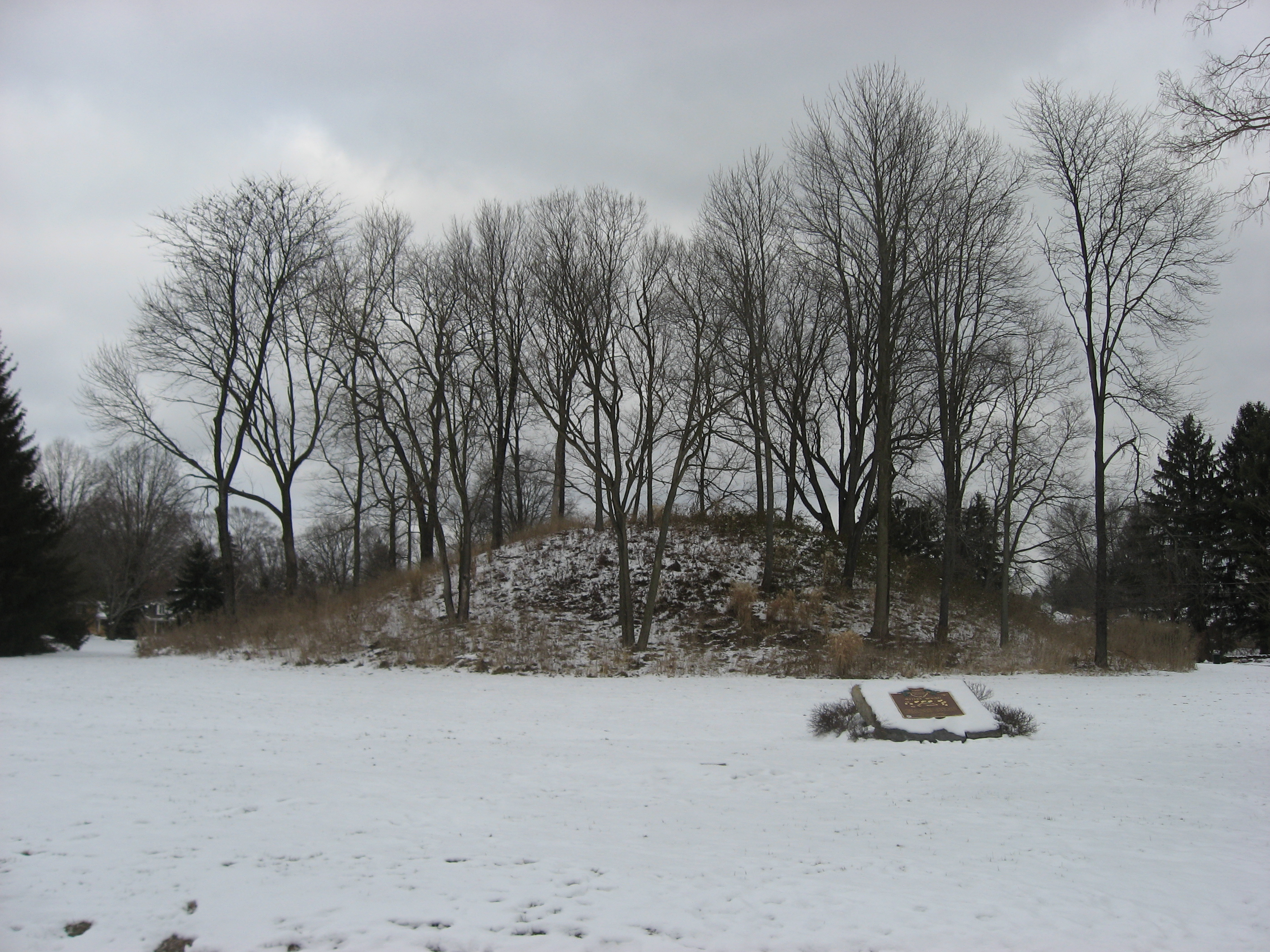
A view of Jeffers mound in the winter; the Ohio History Connection marker is visible in the foreground

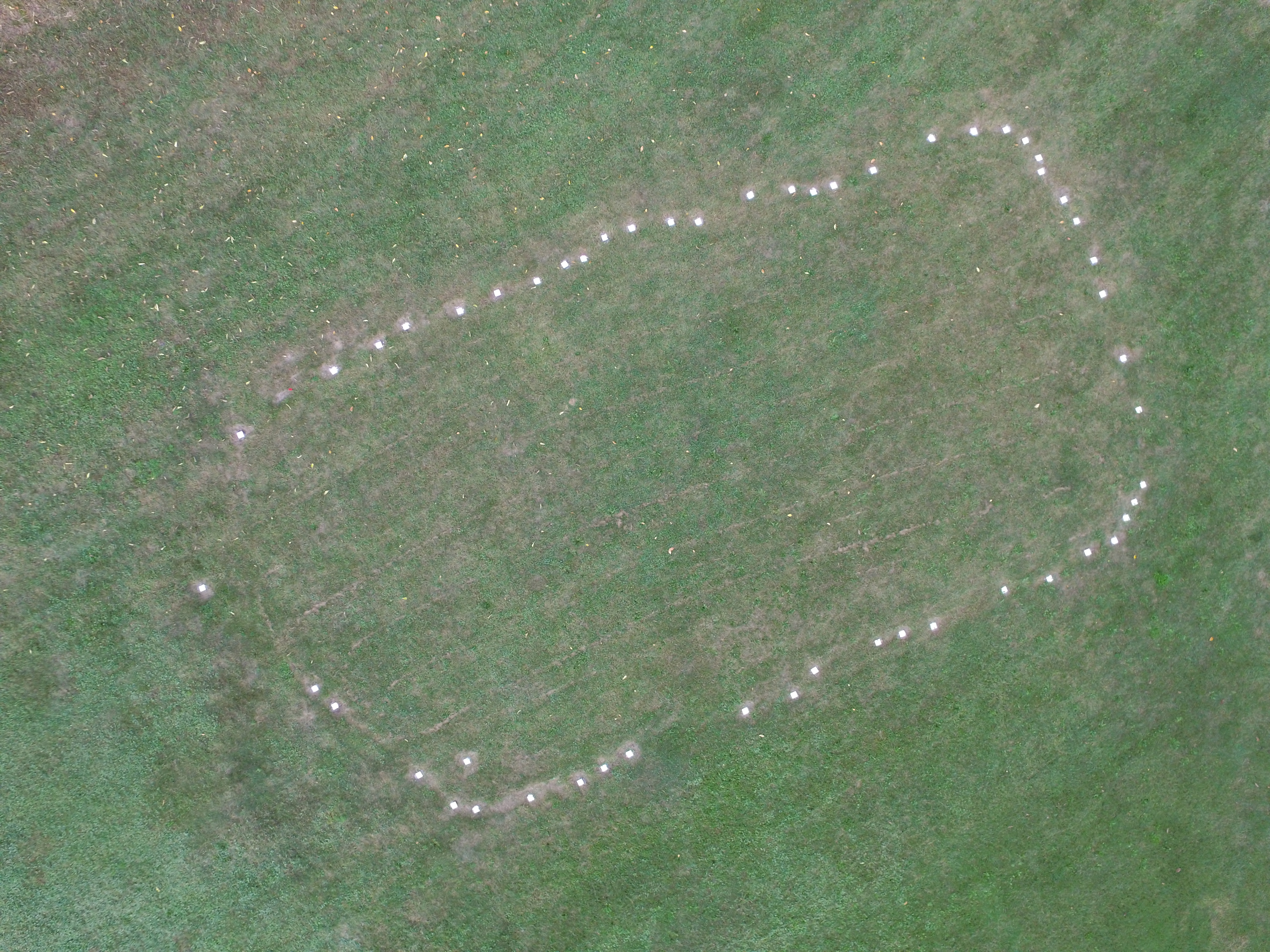
View from above of markers that show the footprint of a rectangular wooden structure near Jeffers Mound

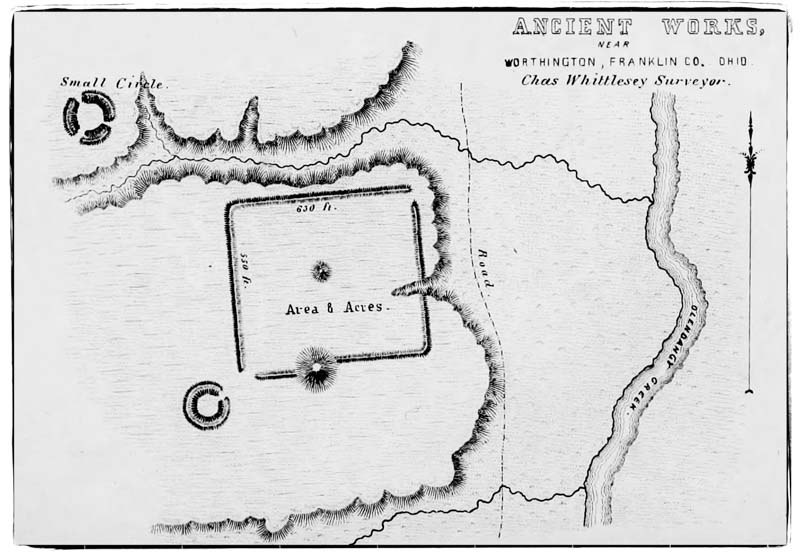
1848 map of the Worthington Earthworks, published by Charles Whittlesey
