= Bridge War =

The Bridge War may refer to a number of unrelated conflicts in the United States:

- The Red River Bridge War in Oklahoma and Texas in 1931
- The Milwaukee Bridge War in 1845
- The Bridge War between Cleveland and Ohio City: see The Flats
- The Bridge Wars between hip-hop groups Boogie Down Productions and the Juice Crew
