= St. John's Episcopal Church (Worthington, Ohio) =

Historic church in Ohio, United States

- U.S. National Register of Historic Places
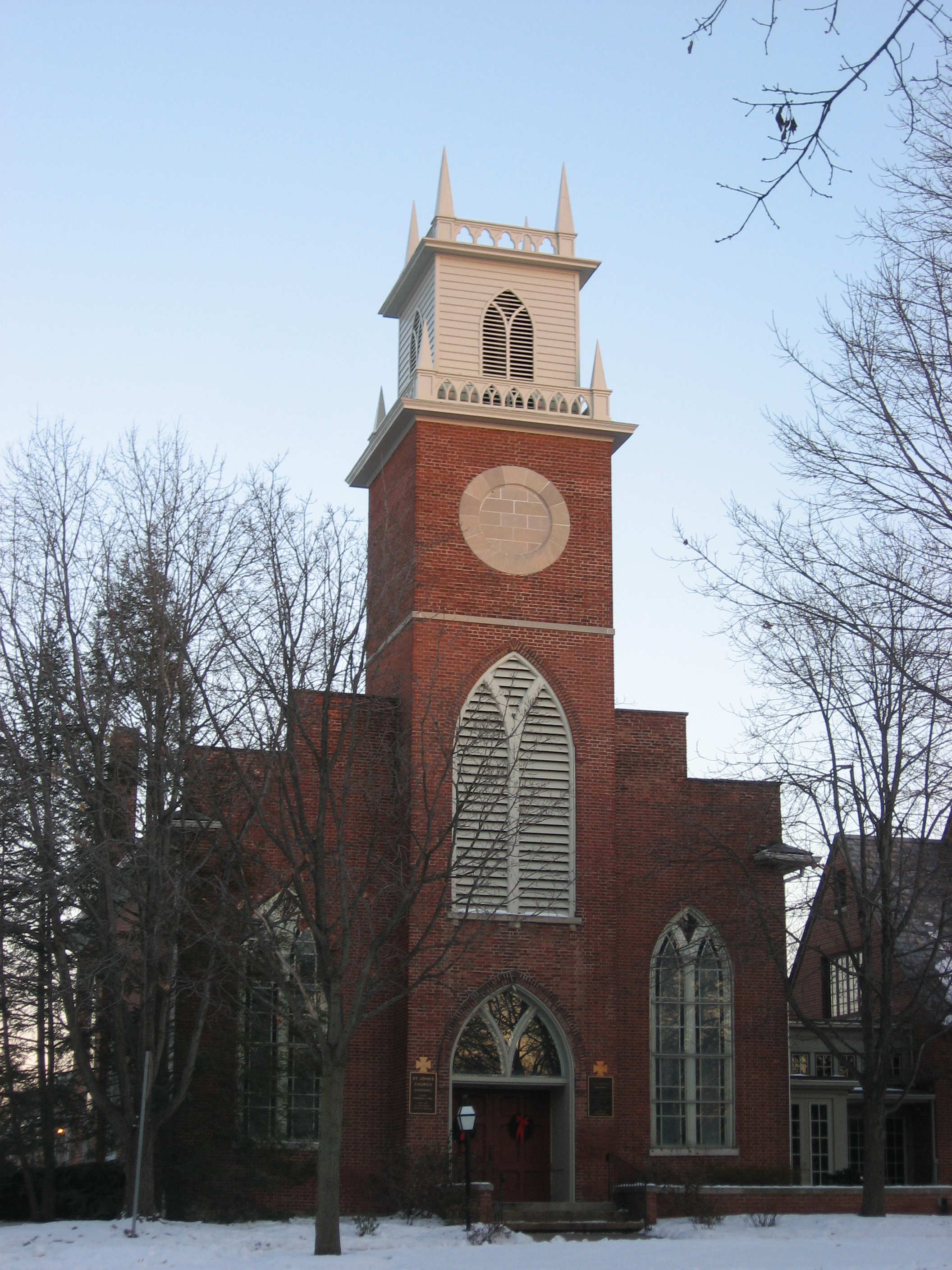
- St. John's Episcopal Church, Christmas 2010.

- Location within Ohio Location within the United States
- Location: 700 High Street, Worthington, Ohio
- Coordinates: 40°05′18.2″N 83°01′02.3″W
- Area: 1.66 acres
- Built: 1827-31
- Architectural style: Gothic Revival
- NRHP reference No.: 80003019
- Added to NRHP: April 17, 1980

St. John's Episcopal Church can refer to an Episcopal congregation in the Episcopal Diocese of Southern Ohio, or to the church in which this congregation worships.

Average Sunday Attendance (ASA) reported in 2024 was 144 persons. This was a relative decrease on ASA of 206 in 2020.

In 2019, the church reported 464 members; in 2023, it reported 496 members. No membership statistics were reported in 2024 national parochial reports. Plate and pledge financial support reported by the church in 2023 was $561,751.

== History ==
The congregation was organized as St. John's Church in Worthington and Parts Adjacent on February 6, 1804, in a meeting of the town founders led by James Kilbourne, the same Episcopal deacon who founded the city in which the church resides. It was the first Episcopal congregation established in the former Northwest Territory and State of Ohio, and the earliest organized faith community of any denomination in central Ohio. In 1807 the parish was incorporated by an act of the Ohio legislature, only the second incorporated parish in the young state. The Reverend Philander Chase, St. John's first rector, arrived in 1817. From St. John's he also served the needs of central Ohio Episcopal congregations in Berkshire (Grace Church), Columbus (Trinity Church) and Delaware (St. Peter's).

The property occupied by the church and churchyard (cemetery) were allocated for use by the future congregation when the Scioto Company platted their purchased land in early 1803, prior to their departure from New England to settle Worthington. On their arrival, the congregation first worshipped in a multi-purpose log building erected just north of the current church, and then in the Worthington Academy (school) building. The Gothic Revival church was built between 1827 and 1831, its construction probably managed by Aurora Buttles, Worthington's master brickmason. It is among the longest continuously used houses of worship in Ohio. The nave was extended slightly eastward beyond the original footprint in 1917. There is no longer a rectory on the campus, but the current parish house, Kilbourne Hall, was built in 1927 on the site of an earlier structure, and the church's Early Education Center was built in 1962. Township Hall, built in 1856 to serve as a school building, was purchased by the church in 1975 and is used for community outreach activities.

In addition to the church itself, Township Hall and the churchyard were all inducted to the National Register of Historic Places on April 17, 1980.

== Burials ==
The churchyard served as a burial ground for both the parish and the community until 1859 when Worthington's first municipal cemetery was opened. It contains over 300 documented burials between 1804 and 1882 including the earliest recorded African-American burials in Franklin County. The log maintained by St. John's sexton, George Griswold, between April 1825 and 1843 provides a glimpse into infant and maternal mortality, and prevalence of fatal diseases like cholera and "consumption" (tuberculosis). At least 11 Revolutionary War Patriots are believed to be buried in the graveyard: Private Joel Adams of Connecticut; Sergeant James Butterfield of Massachusetts; Private Israel Case of Connecticut; Noah Comstock of Connecticut; Private John Goodrich of Connecticut; Private Moses Maynard of Connecticut; Fifer Stephane Maynard of Connecticut; Private Alexander Morrison of Massachusetts; Private Lemuel Orton of Connecticut; Drummer Abner Pinney of Connecticut; Private William Thompson of Massachusetts.

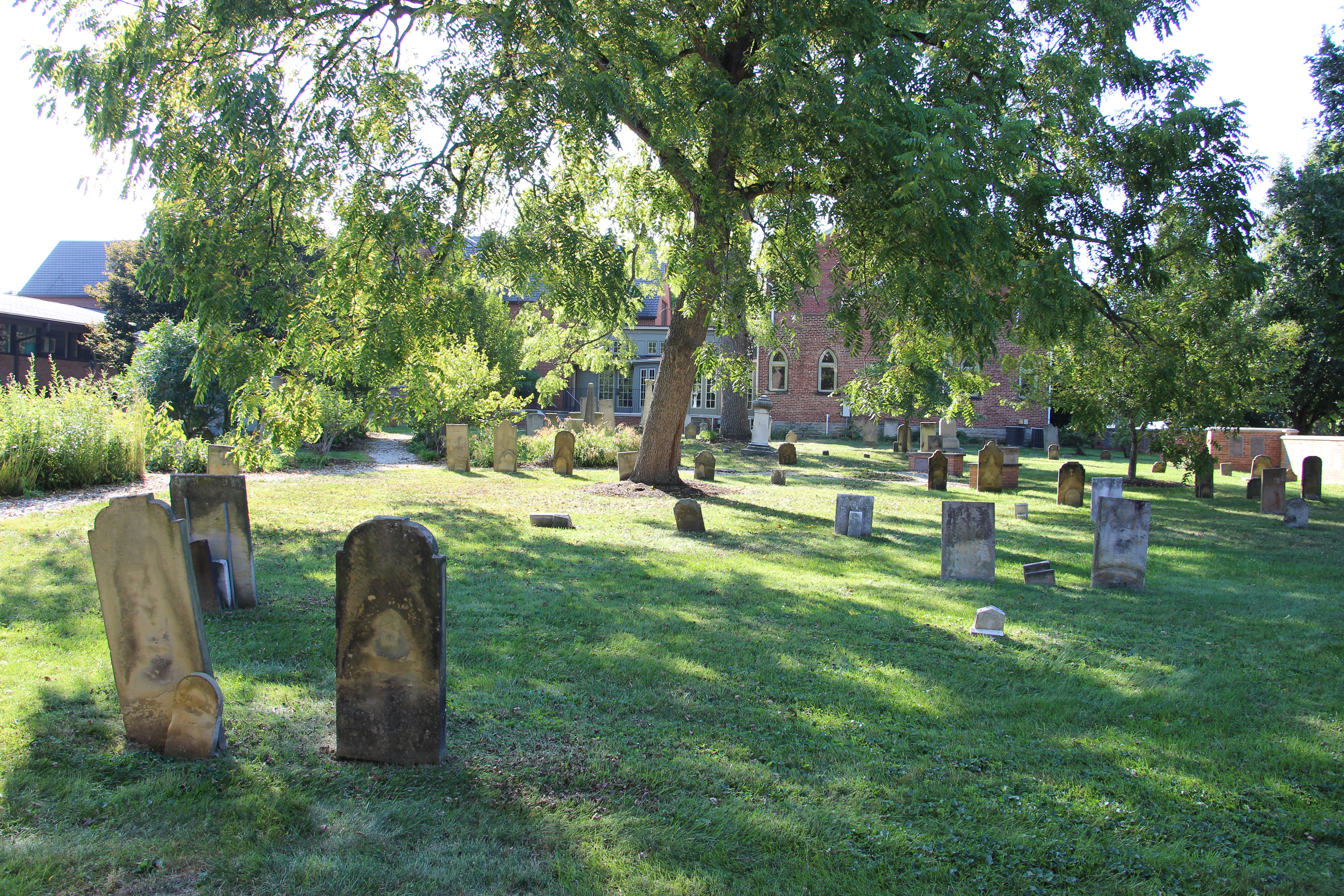
The graveyard behind St. John's Episcopal Church in Worthington, Ohio.
