= James Kilbourne =

American politician

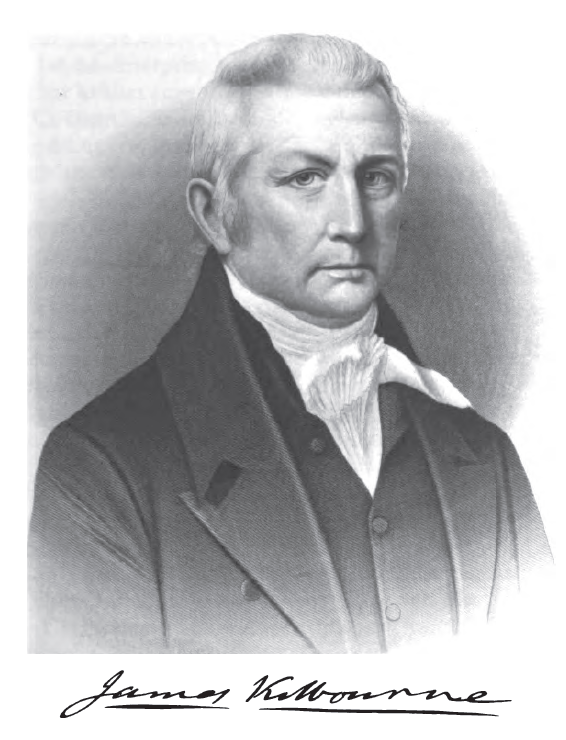

Member of the U.S. House of Representatives from Ohio's 5th district
- In office March 4, 1813 – March 3, 1817
- Preceded by: new district
- Succeeded by: Philemon Beecher

Member of the Ohio House of Representatives from Franklin County
- In office December 1, 1823 – December 5, 1824
- Preceded by: David Smith
- Succeeded by: G. W. Williams
- In office December 3, 1838 – December 1, 1839
- Preceded by: Alfred Kelly; Robert Neil
- Succeeded by: B. Comstock

Personal details
- Born: James Kilbourne; October 19, 1770 New Britain, Connecticut Colony, British America
- Died: April 9, 1850 (aged 79) Worthington, Ohio, U.S.
- Party: Democratic-Republican
- Children: 8, including Byron Kilbourn

James Kilbourne (October 19, 1770 – April 9, 1850) was an American surveyor, politician, Episcopalian clergyman, and Ohio pioneer. He was the founder of Worthington, Ohio, and served two terms in the U.S. House of Representatives, representing Ohio's 5th congressional district from 1813 to 1817. He also served two terms in the Ohio House of Representatives, and served as a colonel in the Ohio militia during the War of 1812.

His son, Byron Kilbourn, was one of the founders of Milwaukee, Wisconsin, and an important figure in the early history of Wisconsin.

== Early life and career ==
Kilbourne was born in New Britain in the Connecticut Colony, and moved his family to Ohio in 1803, when he founded the city of Worthington, Ohio. His ancestors came to the Americas from Yorkshire, England. In 1804 a group he led founded St. John's Episcopal Church in Worthington, Ohio.

In 1805 he was appointed United States surveyor of public lands. During the War of 1812, Kilbourne served as colonel of a frontier regiment.

In 1991, Worthington Kilbourne High School and Kilbourne Middle School, named after James Kilbourne, opened in the Worthington City School District.

He was a trustee of Ohio University from 1804 to 1820.

== Congress and Ohio legislature ==
Kilbourne was elected as a Democratic-Republican to two terms in the United States House of Representatives, representing Ohio's fifth district from 1813 to 1817.

He was also a member of the Ohio House of Representatives in 1823, 1824, 1838 and 1839.

== Later life ==
Kilbourne served as an Ohio presidential elector for James Monroe in the 1820 presidential election.

He died on April 9, 1850 in Worthington, Ohio at the age of 79.

== Family ==
He was the father of Byron Kilbourn, also a surveyor, who was a founder and mayor of Milwaukee, Wisconsin.

U.S. House of Representatives
Preceded by new district	Member of the U.S. House of Representatives from Ohio's 5th congressional district 1813 - 1817	Succeeded by Philemon Beecher
Ohio House of Representatives
Preceded by David Smith	Representative from Franklin County; December 1, 1823-December 5, 1824	Succeeded by G. W. Williams
Preceded by Alfred Kelly; Robert Neil	Representative from Franklin County; December 3, 1838-December 1, 1839; Served alongside: John W. Andrews	Succeeded by B. Comstock
