= Linworth Alternative Program =

Linworth Experiential Program
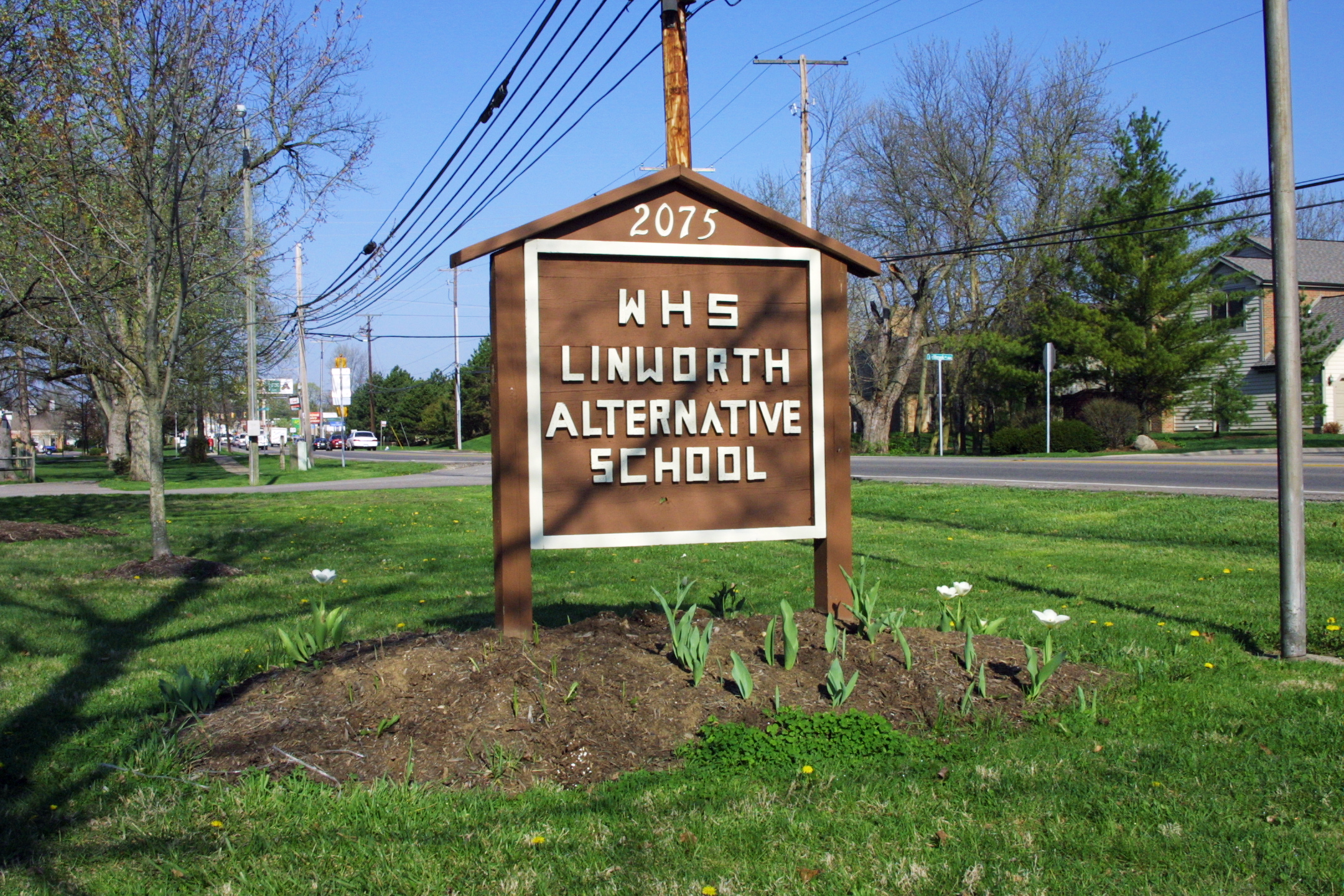

Location
- 2075 West Dublin-Granville Road; Worthington, (Franklin County), Ohio 43085; United States; 40°5′22″N 83°2′45″W

Information
- Type: Public high school
- Established: 1973
- School district: Worthington City School District
- Director: Chris Hasebrook
- Grades: 9-12
- Enrollment: 179 (Grades 9-12) (January 2012)
- Mascot: Newt
- Nickname: "Linworth EP" or "Linworth"
- Alumni: Linworth Alumni Partnership
- Website: www.linworth.org

Linworth Experiential Program (formerly Linworth Alternative Program) is located in Worthington, Ohio, in the Linworth area and is part of the Worthington City School District.

== History ==
The Linworth Experiential Program opened in the fall of 1973 as another high school option for students who attended Worthington High School. In 1991, Worthington High School was renamed Thomas Worthington High School and the district opened a new high school: Worthington Kilbourne High School. Linworth is now an option for students who would attend either of the district's high schools. The goal of the program is to fully engage students in their educations. This is accomplished by creating situations in which students have to make choices, take on more responsibility, and to actively apply what they have learned through experiential education.

== Walkabout ==
The Walkabout program is designed for seniors who have met graduation requirements prior to the second semester of their senior year. It is provided to help students explore their possible career paths and to help students become more independent. Students plan two eight week, off campus activities which they will attend full-time. Students may choose anything in a related field of their desire with staff approval. Students are required to keep journals throughout their experience. The purpose of journaling is to have students reflect and think about their experiences away from school and in some cases away from home.

== Town Meeting ==
Town meeting is the school's form of government and has been a part of the program since its beginning. Students and teachers have an opportunity to bring up issues that concern the Linworth, their home school or city events that they would like to make known. Town Meeting provides students an opportunity to get more involved in their school government and decision making. Town Meeting largely replaces Student Council at traditional high schools. Every person—regardless of status as a student, teacher, or administrator—gets one vote on all meeting initiatives.

== Directors ==
Linworth directors from past to present are:

1973 to 1976
John Miller
1976 to 1978
Rick Studer
1978 to 1991
Barb (Laird) Hill
1991 to 2012
Wayne Harvey
2012 to Present
Chris Hasebrook

== Linworth Alumni Partnership ==
Founded in 2012, the Linworth Alumni Partnership is a non-profit group dedicated to the advancement of Linworth Experiential Program and its past, current and future students. The mission of the Linworth Alumni Partnership is to connect and support the Linworth community through mentorship, networking, fundraising and event planning.

== NOSB ==
The Linworth National Ocean Sciences Bowl (NOSB) team has attended the Great Lakes Bowl, the regional competition held each year at the University of Michigan, Ann Arbor.

1999
6th place out of 15 teams
2001
3rd place out of 12 teams
2002
2nd place out of 11 teams
2003
2nd place
2004
1st place
2005
1st place. Finished 9th place in the national competition in Biloxi, MS.

== Worthington Spelling Bee ==
2012
3rd place (behind two perennial adult winners).
