= Liam McCullough =

American football player (born 1997)

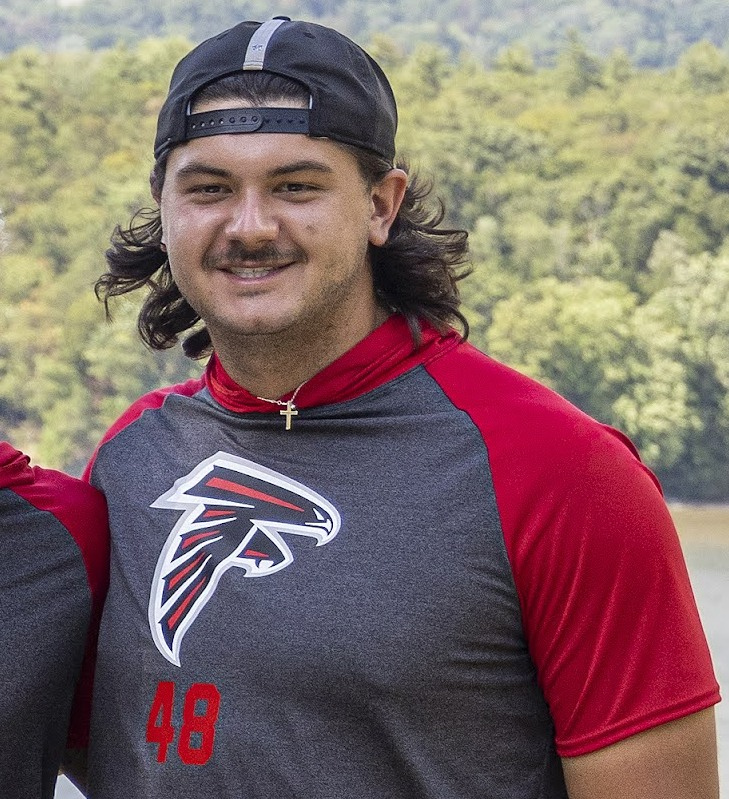
- McCullough with the Atlanta Falcons in 2022

No. 49 – Atlanta Falcons
- Position: Long snapper
- Roster status: Active

Personal information
- Born: June 5, 1997 (age 29); Columbus, Ohio, U.S.
- Listed height: 6 ft 2 in (1.88 m)
- Listed weight: 245 lb (111 kg)

Career information
- High school: Worthington Kilbourne (Columbus)
- College: Ohio State (2015–2019)
- NFL draft: 2020: undrafted

Career history
- Las Vegas Raiders (2020)*; Pittsburgh Steelers (2020)*; Las Vegas Raiders (2021)*; Atlanta Falcons (2022–present)
- * Offseason or practice squad member only

Career NFL statistics as of Week 8, 2026
- Games played: 76
- Total tackles: 7
- Stats at Pro Football Reference

Liam McCullough (born June 5, 1997) is an American professional football long snapper for the Atlanta Falcons of the National Football League (NFL). He played college football for the Ohio State Buckeyes and was signed as an undrafted free agent by the Las Vegas Raiders after the 2020 NFL draft.

== College career ==
McCullough was ranked as a two-star recruit by 247Sports.com coming out of high school. He committed to Ohio State on June 10, 2014, after Ohio State offered a full scholarship.

== Professional career ==
Pre-draft measurables
Height	Weight
6 ft 1 3/4 in (1.87 m)	237 lb (108 kg)
Values from Pro Day

=== Las Vegas Raiders (first stint) ===
McCullough signed with the Las Vegas Raiders as an undrafted free agent after the 2020 NFL draft. McCullough was released as the Raiders cut their roster to 80 players on August 3, 2020.

=== Pittsburgh Steelers ===
On August 27, 2020, McCullough signed with the Pittsburgh Steelers. He was released by Pittsburgh as part of final roster cuts on September 5.

=== Las Vegas Raiders (second stint) ===
On January 6, 2021, McCullough rejoined the Raiders on a reserve/future contract. He was waived by Las Vegas on August 16.

=== Atlanta Falcons ===
On April 26, 2022, McCullough signed with the Atlanta Falcons.

He re-signed with the Falcons as an exclusive rights free agent on February 22, 2023.

On March 6, 2025, McCullough signed a four-year contract extension with the Falcons.

== Personal life ==
McCullough is of Greek descent.
