= Worthington City School District =

School district in Ohio, United States

Address
- 200 East Wilson Bridge Road Worthington, Ohio, 43085; United States

District information
- Type: Public
- Grades: PK–12
- President: Kelli Davis
- Vice-president: Amber Epling-Skinner
- Superintendent: Trent Bowers
- Schools: 19
- NCES District ID: 3904513

Students and staff
- Students: 10,874 (2025–2026)
- Teachers: 672.02 (on an FTE basis) (2025–2026)
- Staff: 903.90 (on an FTE basis) (2025–2026)
- Student–teacher ratio: 16.18 (2025–2026)

Other information
- Website: www.worthington.k12.oh.us

The Worthington City School District includes the city of Worthington, Village of Riverlea, and neighboring portions of Perry Township, Sharon Township, and the City of Columbus, Ohio. There are approximately 60,000 people residing in the area with 13,837 in Worthington proper as of 2013. Since July 1, 2015, Trent Bowers is the Superintendent of Worthington Schools.

The student enrollment for the Worthington School District was 9,925 for the 2015–2016 school year.

According to the district quality profile, 93% of Worthington graduates attend 2- or 4-year institutions of higher learning following graduation. The class of 2015 was offered more than $27 million in scholarship money. More than 75% of high school students participate in extracurricular activities, including 29 varsity sports, 40 clubs, music and performance activities.

== Governance ==
A five-member Board of Education is elected to lead the Worthington School District. Current BOE members include Board President Nikki Hudson, Board Vice President Kelli Davis, and Board Members Stephanie Harless, Amber Epling-Skinner, and Jennifer Best.

== Report card ==
Worthington Schools offers over 180 different courses, with over 400 students given the chance to earn college credit through a dual enrollment program. In 2015, Worthington Schools was given an A rating by the Ohio Department of Education for its graduation rate.

== Schools ==
=== High schools ===
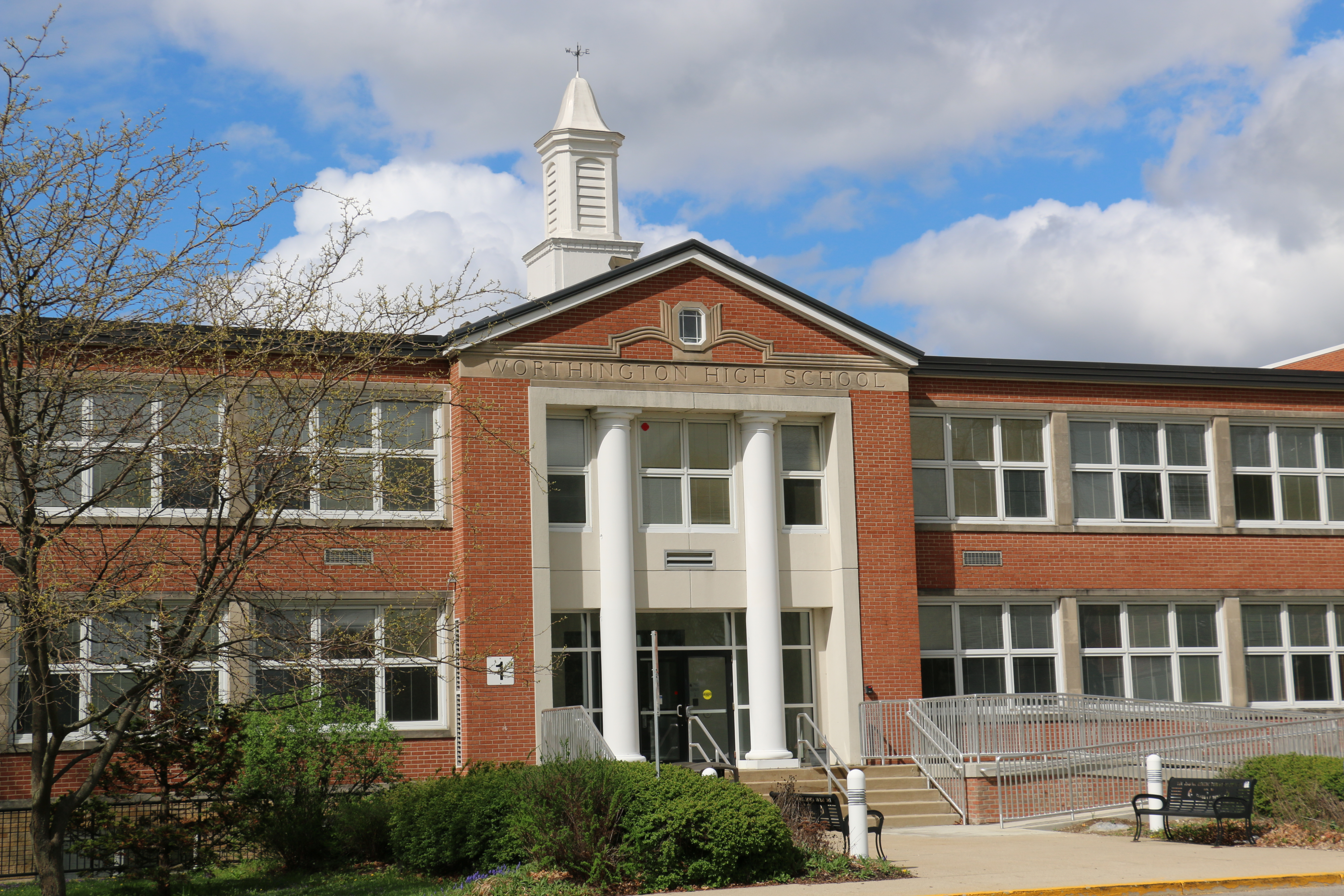
Thomas Worthington High School

Worthington Kilbourne High School

- Thomas Worthington High School
- Worthington Kilbourne High School
- Linworth Alternative High School
- Worthington Academy

=== Middle schools ===
- Kilbourne Middle School
- McCord Middle School
- Perry Middle School
- Phoenix Middle School (alternative middle school program)
- Worthingway Middle School

=== Elementary schools ===
- Bluffsview Elementary
- Brookside Elementary
- Colonial Hills Elementary
- Evening Street Elementary
- Granby Elementary
- Liberty Elementary
- Slate Hill Elementary
- Wilson Hill Elementary
- Worthington Estates Elementary
- Worthington Hills Elementary
- Worthington Park Elementary

=== Preschool ===
- Sutter Park (housing the district's special education preschool program)
