= Rush Creek Village =

Historic neighbourhood in Ohio

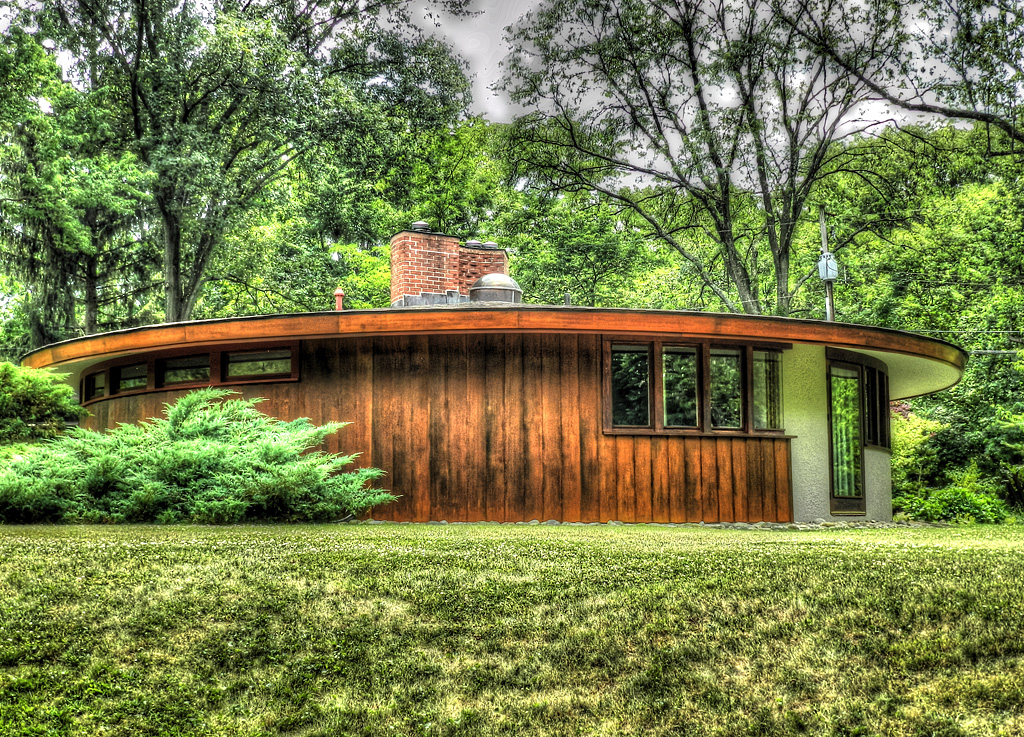
Rush Creek Village Round House

Rush Creek Village is a historic neighborhood in Worthington, Ohio, just north of Columbus. It was founded in 1954 by Martha and Richard Wakefield, who—along with architect Theodore Van Fossen—designed and built a community of 48 houses (later expanded to 51) based on Frank Lloyd Wright's principles of Usonian architecture. Rush Creek Village was added to the National Register of Historic Places on August 14, 2003.

== History ==
In 1946, Martha and Richard Wakefield of Columbus, Ohio, who had recently discovered the architecture of Frank Lloyd Wright, were inspired to visit the architect at his Arizona studio, Taliesin West. As they were leaving, Mr. Wright advised Mrs. Wakefield to "[g]o home, buy a Jeep and build a house for yourself. Then build a house for your next-door neighbor." She took his advice to heart, and in 1954 her husband, a builder, began working with Theodore Van Fossen, an architect and former student of Wright's, to create what would become the nation's largest collection of homes based on Wright's principle of organic architecture. In developing the neighborhood Wakefield had difficulties first finding the land, and securing bank loans due to the non-traditional designs.

Rush Creek Village was added to the National Register of Historic Places on August 14, 2003. Beth Savage, an architectural historian with the Park Service, called Rush Creek "a wonderful and intact example of a local interpretation of Wright's organic architecture philosophy."

Van Fossen designed each home to meet the needs of its owners and integrates with the surrounding environment. Homes often featured unusual angles, open floor plans,, extensive windows, and organic materials.
