= Milwaukee Bridge War =

1845 conflict among residents of present-day Milwaukee, Wis., US

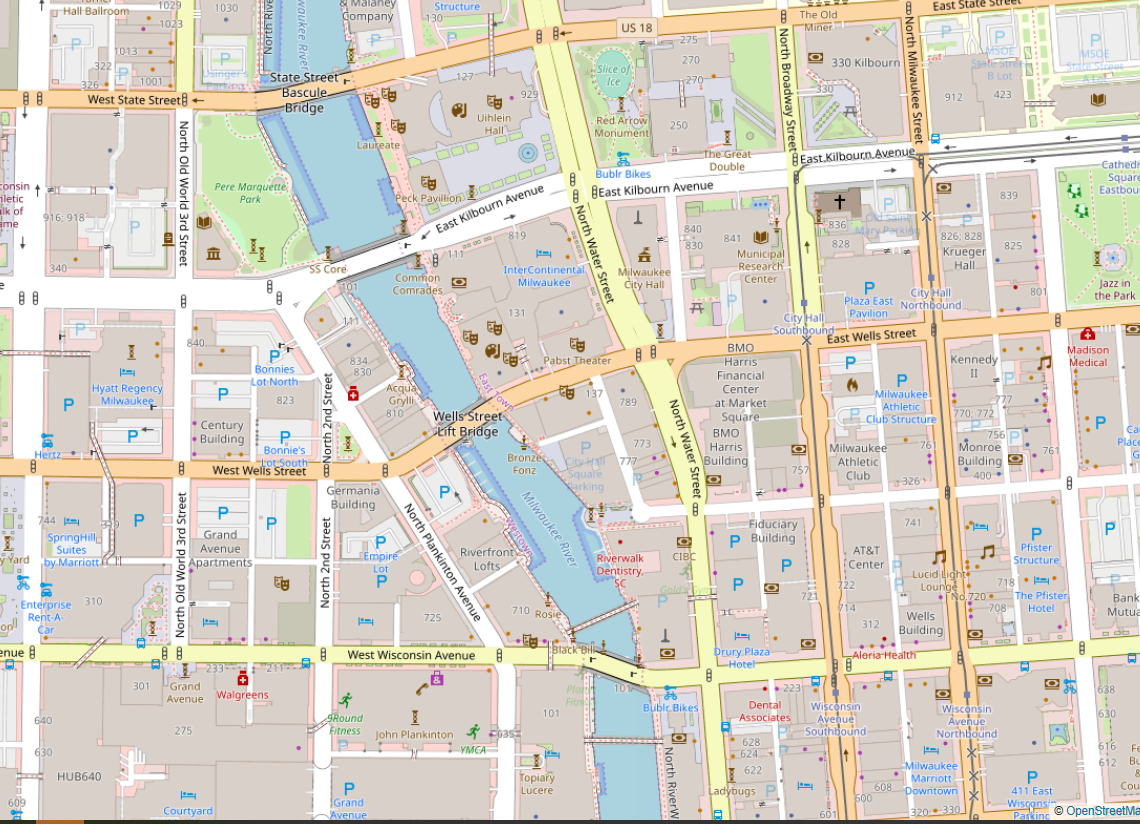
Street map showing misalignment of grid systems and bridges

The Milwaukee Bridge War, sometimes simply the Bridge War, was an 1845 conflict between people from different regions of what is now the city of Milwaukee, Wisconsin, over the construction of a bridge crossing the Milwaukee River.

== Background ==
The area that is now the city of Milwaukee was originally home to three settlements: Solomon Juneau's Juneautown, founded on the east side of the Milwaukee River in 1818; Byron Kilbourn's Kilbourntown on the west side of the river, founded in 1834; and Walker's Point to the south, founded by George H. Walker also in 1834.

The early history of Milwaukee was marked by the rivalry between Juneautown and Kilbourntown, mostly due to the actions of Byron Kilbourn. Kilbourn had been trying to isolate Juneautown to make it more dependent on Kilbourntown. For example, when he laid out his street grid in 1835, he paid no attention to the existing street layout of Juneautown. Kilbourn's maps showed Juneautown as a blank space, and when steamers delivered goods to Kilbourn's west-side docks, he ordered the captains to tell passengers that Juneautown was an Indian trading post. The three areas were incorporated into the village of Milwaukee in 1839.

== The bridges ==
In 1840, the Wisconsin Territorial Legislature, finding the ferry system on the Milwaukee River to be "inadequate", ordered the construction of a bridge. This first bridge was built over Chestnut Street (now Juneau), with Solomon Juneau's support. That same year Kilbourn built a bridge across the Menomonee River. Three more bridges were built over the Milwaukee — at Spring Street (now Wisconsin) in 1842, at Oneida (now Wells) in 1844, and one between Walker's Point and Juneautown at North Water Street. Kilbourn was opposed to the Chestnut, Oneida, and North Water bridges, as he felt they would be a hazard to ships visiting his docks.

== The war ==
On 3 May 1845, a schooner rammed into the Spring Street bridge, the only one that was supported by Kilbourn. Rumors spread that East Ward residents, angry at the West Warders for refusing to pay for bridge maintenance, had paid the schooner's captain to damage the Spring Street bridge. West warders held a meeting and decided that the Chestnut Street bridge (supported by Solomon Juneau) had become an "insupportable nuisance". The west warders gathered tools and took down the west half of the Chestnut Street bridge, collapsing it. Angry east warders gathered weapons, including an old cannon (loaded only with clock weights) that they rolled up to the east side of the river. The cannon was aimed at Kilbourn's home, but the east warders held their fire when they learned that Kilbourn's young daughter had just died.

The village trustees voted to remove the Oneida bridge and use the pieces to repair the Spring Street bridge. This would have removed both of the east warders' preferred bridges. Angered by the trustees' vote, east warders gathered on 28 May and destroyed the Spring Street bridge, followed by the bridge on the Menomonee.

The next few weeks were tense. East and west warders on the "wrong side" of the river were attacked and injured; east warders spread rumors of an attack on Kilbourn's Milwaukee River dam. By early June, the trustees ordered that all bridge work be done under armed guard.

Tempers slowly cooled as the year went on. In December, the trustees put together a plan for three new bridges and drafted a city charter. Finally, on 31 January 1846, the city of Milwaukee was formed.

An echo of the differences between East and West Milwaukee can still be seen today. Many of the modern bridges across the Milwaukee River run at an angle, reflecting the difference in the street layouts between what was once Juneautown and Kilbourntown.
