= Riverlea, Ohio =

- Village
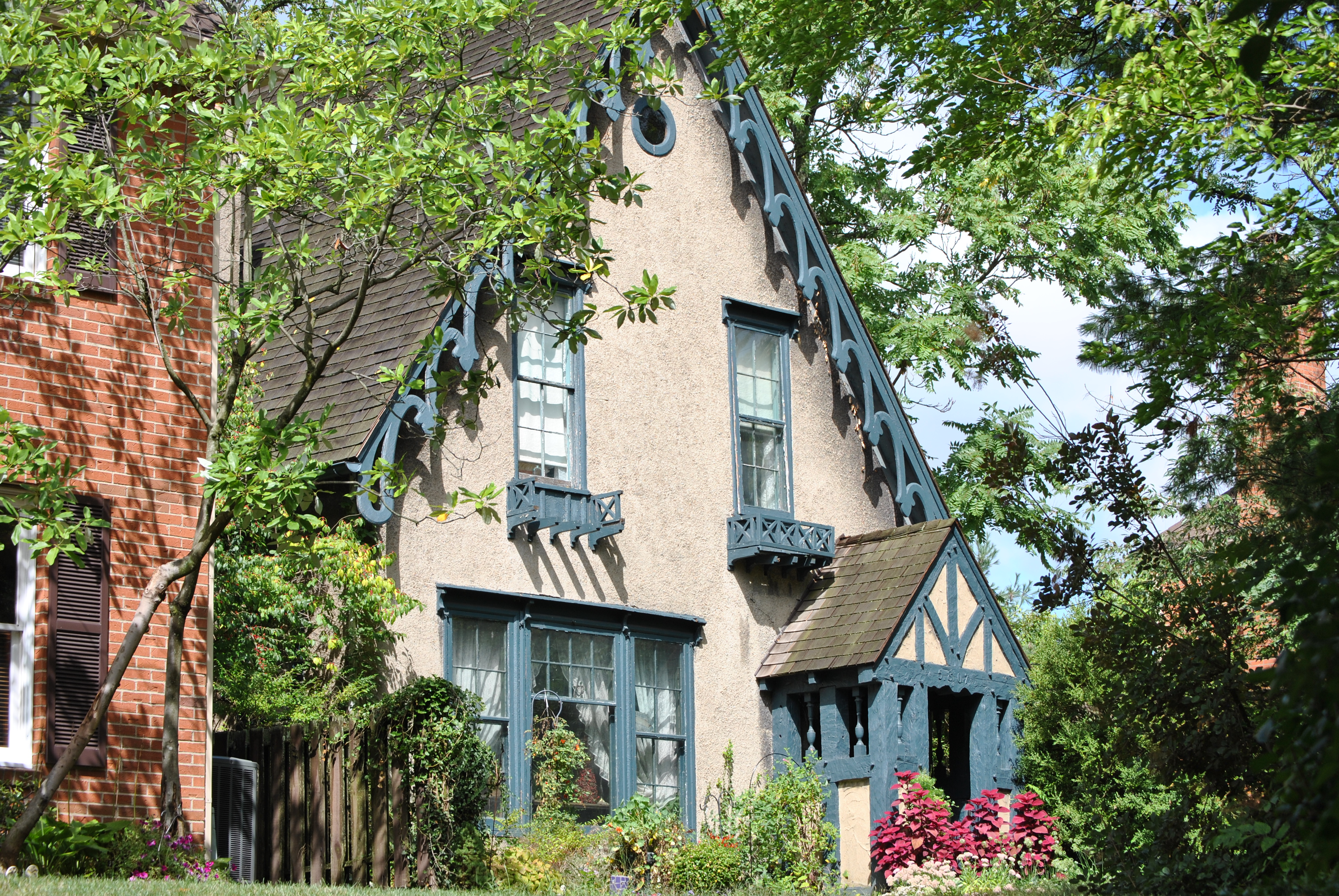
- Mark Russell House on High Street

- Flag Logo

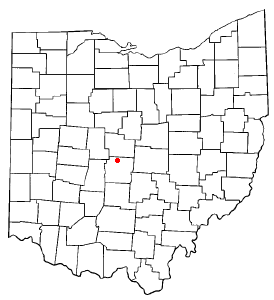
- Location of Riverlea within Ohio

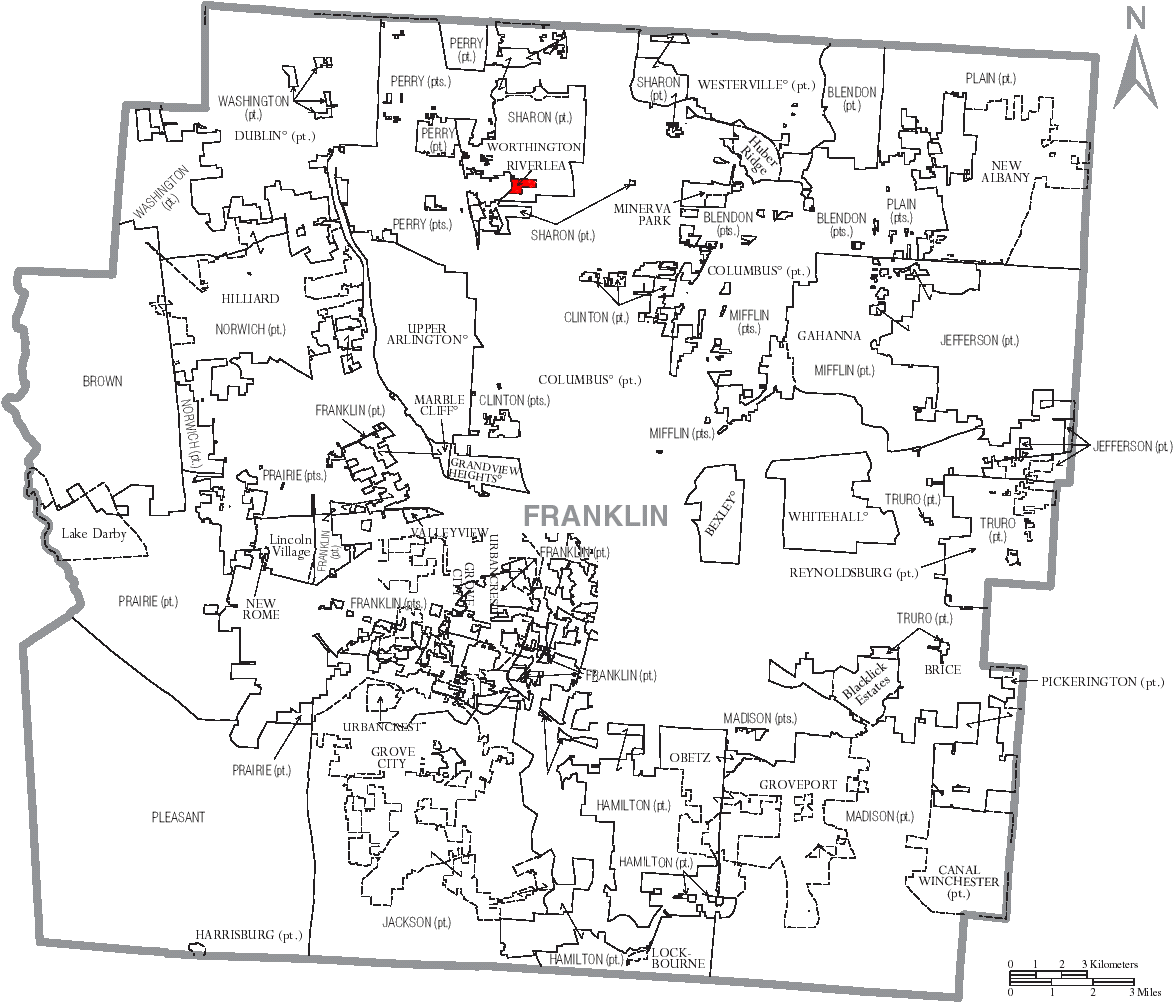
- Location of Riverlea within Franklin County
- Coordinates: 40°04′49″N 83°01′30″W
- Country: United States
- State: Ohio
- County: Franklin

Area
  - Total: 0.15 sq mi (0.39 km^{2})
  - Land: 0.15 sq mi (0.39 km^{2})
  - Water: 0 sq mi (0.00 km^{2})
- Elevation: 791 ft (241 m)

Population (2020)
  - Total: 599
  - Density: 3,971.9/sq mi (1,533.55/km^{2})
- Time zone: UTC-5 (Eastern (EST))
  - Summer (DST): UTC-4 (EDT)
- ZIP code: 43085
- Area code: 614
- FIPS code: 39-67440
- GNIS feature ID: 2399088
- Website: https://www.riverleaohio.org/

Riverlea is a village in Franklin County, Ohio, United States, surrounded by Worthington on its north, south, and east sides, and bordered on the west by the Olentangy River, across which is Columbus. Riverlea was incorporated in 1939, a small community that formed on former farmland. The population was 599 at the 2020 census.

In 2011, Riverlea and Worthington explored the possibility of the annexation of Riverlea to Worthington. Riverlea voters defeated the annexation.

== Geography ==
According to the United States Census Bureau, the village has a total area of 0.15 square miles (0.39 km^{2}), all land.

Worthington and Riverlea form an enclave of Columbus.

== Demographics ==
Historical population
Census	Pop.	Note	%±
1940	92		—
1950	324		252.2%
1960	625		92.9%
1970	558		−10.7%
1980	528		−5.4%
1990	503		−4.7%
2000	499		−0.8%
2010	545		9.2%
2020	599		9.9%
U.S. Decennial Census 2020

=== 2010 census ===
As of the census of 2010, there were 545 people, 221 households, and 153 families living in the village. The population density was 3,633.3 inhabitants per square mile (1,402.8/km^{2}). There were 236 housing units at an average density of 1,573.3 per square mile (607.5/km^{2}). The racial makeup of the village was 97.1% White, 0.4% African American, 0.2% Native American, 1.5% Asian, and 0.9% from two or more races. Hispanic or Latino of any race were 0.6% of the population.

There were 221 households, of which 39.8% had children under the age of 18 living with them, 58.4% were married couples living together, 9.0% had a female householder with no husband present, 1.8% had a male householder with no wife present, and 30.8% were non-families. 23.1% of all households were made up of individuals, and 10.9% had someone living alone who was 65 years of age or older. The average household size was 2.47 and the average family size was 2.92.

The median age in the village was 44.5 years. 27% of residents were under the age of 18; 2.7% were between the ages of 18 and 24; 21% were from 25 to 44; 33.5% were from 45 to 64; and 15.8% were 65 years of age or older. The gender makeup of the village was 45.0% male and 55.0% female.

=== 2000 census ===
As of the census of 2000, there were 499 people, 229 households, and 149 families living in the village. The population density was 3,100.1 inhabitants per square mile (1,197.0/km^{2}). There were 238 housing units at an average density of 1,478.6 per square mile (570.9/km^{2}). The racial makeup of the village was 95.19% White, 0.20% Native American, 1.80% Asian, 1.20% from other races, and 1.60% from two or more races. Hispanic or Latino of any race were 1.40% of the population.

There were 229 households, out of which 26.2% had children under the age of 18 living with them, 54.1% were married couples living together, 7.9% had a female householder with no husband present, and 34.9% were non-families. 30.1% of all households were made up of individuals, and 11.4% had someone living alone who was 65 years of age or older. The average household size was 2.18 and the average family size was 2.70.

In the village, the population was spread out, with 20.8% under the age of 18, 1.8% from 18 to 24, 23.6% from 25 to 44, 34.5% from 45 to 64, and 19.2% who were 65 years of age or older. The median age was 47 years. For every 100 females there were 82.8 males. For every 100 females age 18 and over, there were 80.4 males.

The median income for a household in the village was $94,737, and the median income for a family was $106,743. Males had a median income of $71,750 versus $47,000 for females. The per capita income for the village was $49,374. None of the families and 0.8% of the population were living below the poverty line, with 2.1% of those over 64 and none under eighteen.
