= Worthington Kilbourne High School =

- Front of WKHS in the autumn

Location
- 1499 Hard Road; Columbus, (Franklin County), Ohio 43235; United States; 40°06′58″N 83°3′20″W

Information
- Type: Public, Coeducational high school
- Established: 1991
- School district: Worthington City Schools
- Superintendent: Trent Bowers
- CEEB code: 365507
- Principal: Aric Thomas
- Faculty: 91
- Grades: 9–12
- Student to teacher ratio: 15.1:1
- Campus size: 259,712sqft
- Campus type: Suburban
- Colors: Royal blue and black
- Fight song: "For the Glory and the Pride"
- Athletics conference: Ohio Capital Conference
- Mascot: Gray wolf
- Team name: Wolves
- Accreditation: North Central Association of Colleges and Schools
- Newspaper: The Ravine
- Yearbook: Wolfbook
- Feeder schools: McCord Middle School, Perry Middle School, Phoenix Middle School students that would traditionally go to McCord or Perry
- Graduation rate: 97.8% (2009-2010)
- Website: Official website

Worthington Kilbourne High School (WKHS) is a public school located in Columbus, Ohio, United States, and is part of the Worthington City School District. Kilbourne was named after James Kilbourne, the founder of the city of Worthington. The school colors are black and royal blue and a gray wolf named "Lobo" is the mascot. The current principal is Aric Thomas.

Within the Worthington City School District, students who attend McCord Middle School, Perry Middle School, and students from Phoenix Middle School who would traditionally attend McCord or Perry feed into WKHS.

== Student demographics ==
In the 2009-2010 school year, approximately 6.0% of the 1,357 students at the school are of Asian descent, about 1.7% are Hispanic and about 6.0% are African American. 82.9% of the students are Caucasian, a category that includes 2.9% students of multi-racial descent. The school has about 1.9% of its students who are considered Limited English Proficient, about 13.1% are Students With Disabilities, and 13.2% are considered Economically Disadvantaged.

== History ==
Worthington Kilbourne was founded in 1991 to handle the increasing student enrollment in the district at Thomas Worthington High School. The school is named after James Kilbourne, the founder of the city of Worthington.

=== Ravine ===
The school was built at 1499 Hard Road, over a ravine, which became the name of the school newspaper. The ravine is considered by students a central element of the school both physically and communally. It has a stream that runs in it which biology and earth science classes conduct research on. The stream brought anxiety during the winter of 2004-2005. After heavy snows, the Worthington area experienced a large rainfall that when combined with the melting snow caused the level of the stream to rise dramatically causing the administration to worry that lasting damage would be done to the school and that the structural integrity of the building could be compromised. It was later determined that there was no lasting damage.

=== Campus land ===
Worthington Kilbourne High School is built on land acquired by the school district from Jack Antrim. The land was long owned by his family until it was condemned and sold to Worthington City Schools.

== Traditions ==
=== Arts in Action ===
Arts in Action is an event that takes place every year in the spring, where students of the school are given a forum to display their works of art. This can take the shape of paintings, photography, sculptures, singing, and instrumental performance. One of the main events of this day is the highly competitive throw down, where potters race to create a clay pot on potters' wheels. Each match is a head-to-head match and the tournament is single elimination. Five points are awarded and the winner is the person who wins at least three points. One point is awarded for the first potter to center his clay. The other four points are awarded after the match is over, 10 minutes later. Another point is awarded for the tallest pot, and one point for the thinnest walls. If a potter has won these three points, it is known as a technical win and the other two points are not awarded (as there are only 2 points left, the other potter cannot win). If however a technical win does not happen, a panel of three judges (two students and a teacher or administrator chosen at the start of the 10-minute period) will vote on which pot they think is better based on artistic merits and creativity. The potter who gets at least two votes from the panel wins two points. Often, the final match is judged by three former champions (sometimes current students, sometimes alumni).

Other activities during the day may include the HOME BASE class building a house in the middle of the commons, inflatable games being brought into the gym, a variety of vendors selling food, drinks, and desserts in the hallways, band, orchestral and choral ensemble performances, and some charity related carnival style games.

=== Black Watch ===
The Kilbourne Black Watch is a group of students who want to see all students excel at Worthington Kilbourne.

The Kilbourne Black Watch was formed in 2007 by 35 WKHS students with the support of their advisor, history teacher John Jordan. The purpose of the organization is to build a spirit of community among WKHS students by offering mutual support for student activities of all kinds. Members of the Black Watch make it their goal to attend at least one home game/match/meet of every WKHS team, one performance of each of the WKHS performing arts groups, and otherwise encourage the efforts of their fellow students in their diverse pursuits. Events which Black Watch members are encouraged to attend are published on a register called “The Watch List.”

When Kilbourne Black Watch members attend an event, they dress in black and sometimes paint their faces royal blue in the manner of the Scottish warriors in the film “Braveheart.” Some members sport a standardized black T-shirt. The front features the Kilbourne Black Watch flag, a black WKHS “K” emblazoned upon the Cross of St. Andrew, the flag of Scotland. The back features the regimental badge of the actual Black Watch regiment in royal blue and white, with the name “Kilbourne” visible across the base of the badge. The back also features the slogan “Alba Gu Bra! Kilburnie Gu Bra!” which means, “Scotland Forever! Kilbourne Forever!” The Kilbourne Black Watch thus honors the Scottish legacy of the school’s namesake, the Rev. James Kilbourne.

=== Battle of Hard Road ===
One of WKHS' biggest rivals is just 2.5 miles down the road. Every year, Worthington Kilbourne High School and Dublin Scioto High School face off in a football game known as the Battle of Hard Road. The winning team is awarded bragging rights for a year as well as a chunk of pavement from Hard Road (the street both schools are on) that serves as a trophy. The two schools first played each other in 1995 and have faced off every year since.

Throughout the rivalry, Kilbourne and Scioto have each won 10 regular season games. These teams have also competed against each other in the playoffs three times, Kilbourne came out on top in 2004 and 2013 while Scioto won in 2014.

== Extracurricular activities ==
Worthington Kilbourne High School is part of the Ohio Capital Conference and has a number of extracurricular activities available to its students.

=== Sports ===
The following sports are available to students:

- Baseball
- Basketball
- Cheerleading
- Cross Country
- Curling
- Dance Team
- Equestrian
- Field Hockey
- Football
- Golf
- Gymnastics
- Ice hockey
- Lacrosse
- Marching band
- Soccer
- Softball
- Speed Skating
- Swimming
- Synchronised swimming
- Table Tennis
- Tennis
- Track and Field
- Volleyball
- Water Polo
- Wrestling

=== Awards and recognitions ===
==== Boys ====
- Men's Gymnastics - Ohio High School Athletic Association State Runner Up 1994.
- Lacrosse - Ohio High School Lacrosse Association State Champions 2009, 2016. State Runner Up 1994, 2005, 2008, 2010, 2011.
- Soccer - Ohio High School Athletic Association State Champions 2000.
- Water Polo - Ohio High School Athletic Association State Champions 2005, 2007
- Tennis - Ohio High School Athletic Association State Runner Up 2001

==== Girls ====
- Water Polo - 2007 State Champions

==== Both ====
- Science Olympiad - Regional Champions 2008, 2013. Regionals Runner Up 2006, 2007, 2012.
- Mock Trial - State Qualifiers 2010, 2012

=== Buckeye Stars Basketball Camp ===
On July 29 to 31 of 2009, WKHS hosted the Buckeye Stars Basketball Camp for children of ages 7 to 18. The camp was run by professional NBA players Mike Conley Jr., Greg Oden and Daequan Cook.

=== Weekend programs ===
The Ohio Contemporary Chinese School (OCCS, simplified Chinese: 俄州现代中文学校; traditional Chinese: 俄州現代中文學校; pinyin: Ézhōu Xiàndài Zhōngwén Xuéxiào) is located in the area, holding classes at Worthington Kilbourne. It serves the Chinese American community.

== Notable alumni ==
- Andrew Anglin - Neo-Nazi and conspiracy theorist; editor of The Daily Stormer.
- Emily Elizabeth Douglas, founder of Grandma's Gifts (Class of 2000)
- Danny O'Rourke, Major League Soccer player (Class of 2001)
- Matt Skura - National Football League player (Los Angeles Rams)
- Alex Hendricks, Cerebral Palsy soccer player and 2012 Paralympian (Class of 2014)
- Liam McCullough - National Football League player (Atlanta Falcons)
- Brakence - Singer-songwriter
