= Worthington, Ohio =

- City
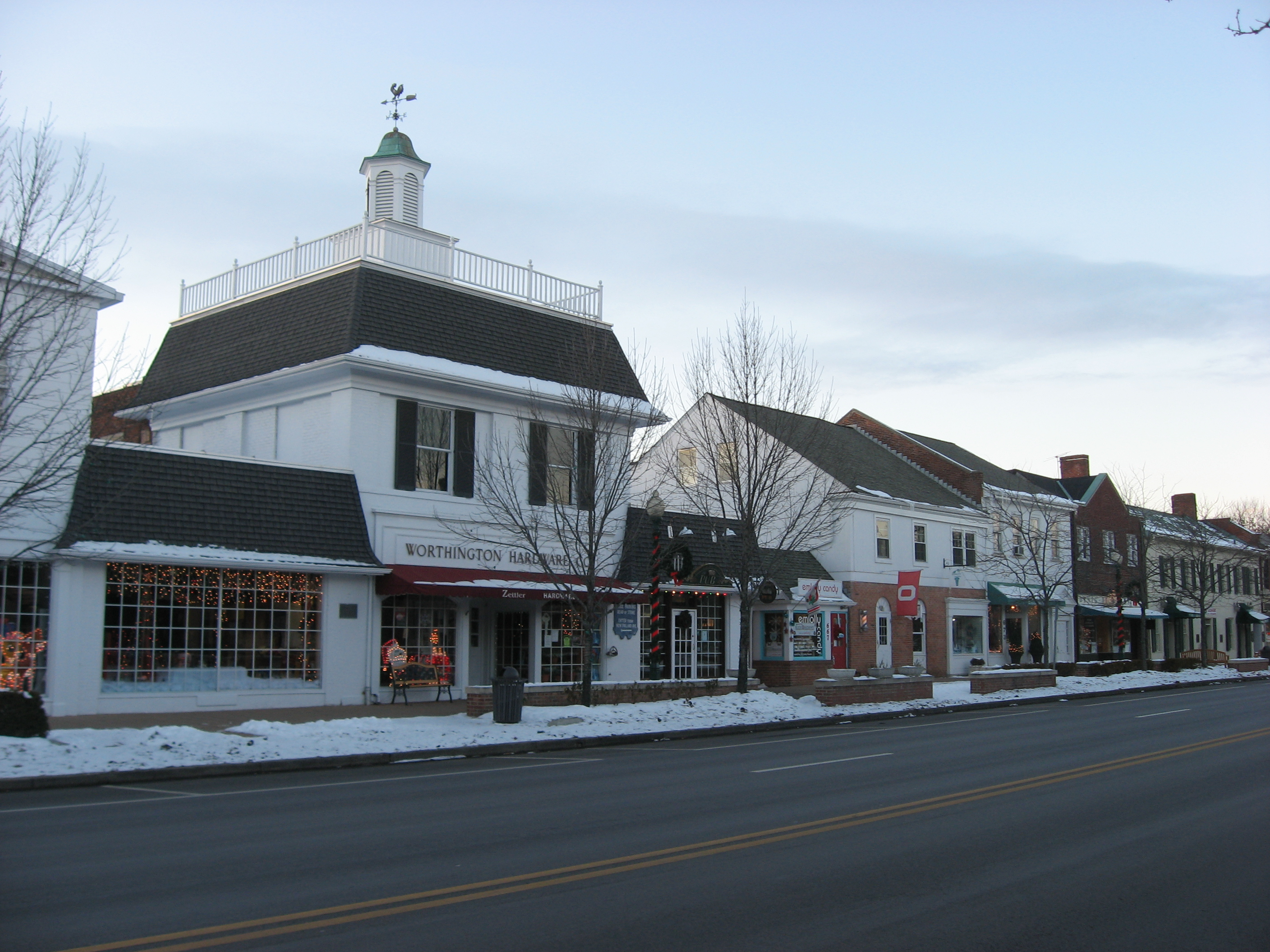
- High Street in 2010

- Flag Logo
- Interactive map of Worthington, Ohio
- Location within Ohio Location within the United States
- Coordinates: 40°05′53″N 83°01′05″W
- Country: United States
- State: Ohio
- County: Franklin

Area
  - Total: 5.55 sq mi (14.37 km^{2})
  - Land: 5.47 sq mi (14.17 km^{2})
  - Water: 0.077 sq mi (0.20 km^{2})
- Elevation: 817 ft (249 m)

Population (2020)
  - Total: 14,786
  - Density: 2,703.0/sq mi (1,043.62/km^{2})
- Demonym: Worthingtonite
- Time zone: UTC-5 (Eastern (EST))
  - Summer (DST): UTC-4 (EDT)
- ZIP code: 43085
- Area code: 614
- FIPS code: 39-86604
- GNIS feature ID: 2397377
- Website: https://www.worthington.org/

Worthington is a city in Franklin County, Ohio, United States, and is a northern suburb of Columbus. The population in the 2020 census was 14,786. The city was founded in 1803 by the Scioto Company led by James Kilbourne, who was later elected to the United States House of Representatives, and named in honor of Thomas Worthington, who later became governor of Ohio.

== History ==
=== First settlement ===
On May 5, 1802, a group of prospective settlers founded the Scioto Company at the home of Rev. Eber B. Clark in Granby, Connecticut for the purpose of forming a settlement between the Muskingum River and Great Miami River in the Ohio Country. James Kilbourne was elected president and Josiah Topping secretary (McCormick 1998:7).

On August 30, 1802, James Kilbourne and Nathaniel Little arrived at Colonel Thomas Worthington's home in Chillicothe, Ohio. They tentatively reserved land along the Scioto River on the Pickaway Plains for their new settlement (McCormick 1998:17).

On October 5, 1802, the Scioto Company met in Granby, Connecticut and decided not to purchase the lands along the Scioto River on the Pickaway Plains, but rather to buy land 30 miles (48 km) farther north from Dr. Jonas Stanbery and his partner, an American Revolutionary War general, Jonathan Dayton. Sixteen thousand acres (65 km^{2}) were purchased along the Whetstone River (now known as the Olentangy River) at $1.50 per acre (McCormick 1998:19-27). This land was part of the United States Military District surveyed by Israel Ludlow in 1797 and divided into townships 5 miles (8.0 km) square.

=== Organization ===
On May 7, 1803, James Kilbourne arrived at what is now Worthington to inspect the Scioto Company's purchase. A work party of seven hired laborers, paid $12 per month each, soon began work clearing the forest (McCormick 1998: 29).

On August 10, 1803, the Scioto Company voted to name the village for Thomas Worthington, one of Ohio's first two senators, and for each member to contribute $2 (about four days wages) to support a library.

In September 1803 the first settlers departed Connecticut by horse. Ezra Griswold was the lone settler who traveled by ox-cart. With this he is officially the first settler of Worthington, beating his fellow Company men to the site. By December 1803, Worthington was divided into 160, three quarter acre city lots with a 5-acre (20,000 m^{2}) public green in the center of the village. Thirty seven persons bid between $53 and $0.25 to select a lot. Those who bid nothing were given a choice of the remaining lots.

Farm lots, ranging from 20 to 130 acres (0.53 km^{2}) and averaging 93 acres (380,000 m^{2}), were sold off in the same way. Both the Episcopal Church and Worthington Academy were given an 80-acre (320,000 m^{2}) farm lot and 20-acre (81,000 m^{2}) wood lot to provide financial support.

=== Dissolution of the Company ===
By August 11, 1804, the plat maps were completed, payments or notes promising payments collected and deeds prepared for all sixteen thousand acres (65 km^{2}) of the Scioto Company's purchase (McCormick 1998:71). On January 28, 1805, having completed its work of apportioning land and establishing the church, school and library, the Scioto Company was dissolved (McCormick 1998:76).

=== Incorporation ===
On February 20, 1808, the Worthington Academy was incorporated by the Ohio legislature and a brick building was constructed facing the northeast quadrant of the public square. Its bell now adorns Kilbourne Middle School. That same year James Kilbourne erected a commercial building for a newspaper. This building still stands at 679-681 High Street as the oldest commercial building in continuous use in the state.

In 1811, Ezra Griswold built a large south-facing brick tavern on the lot north of the northeast quadrant of the public square. That same year, the Orange Johnson house was constructed north of the Village Green.

=== War of 1812 ===
During the War of 1812, several Worthington militia marched north with General William Hull's army and were surrendered at Detroit on August 12, 1812. Orders issued by General William Henry Harrison from "Northwest Army Headquarters, Worthington, Ohio" on October 28, 1812, indicate the commander, like his supply wagons, was using the road north from the capital. On September 7, 1814, Zophar Topping died while serving with Indian scouts. He was one of two Worthington casualties during the war along with Luther Palmer.

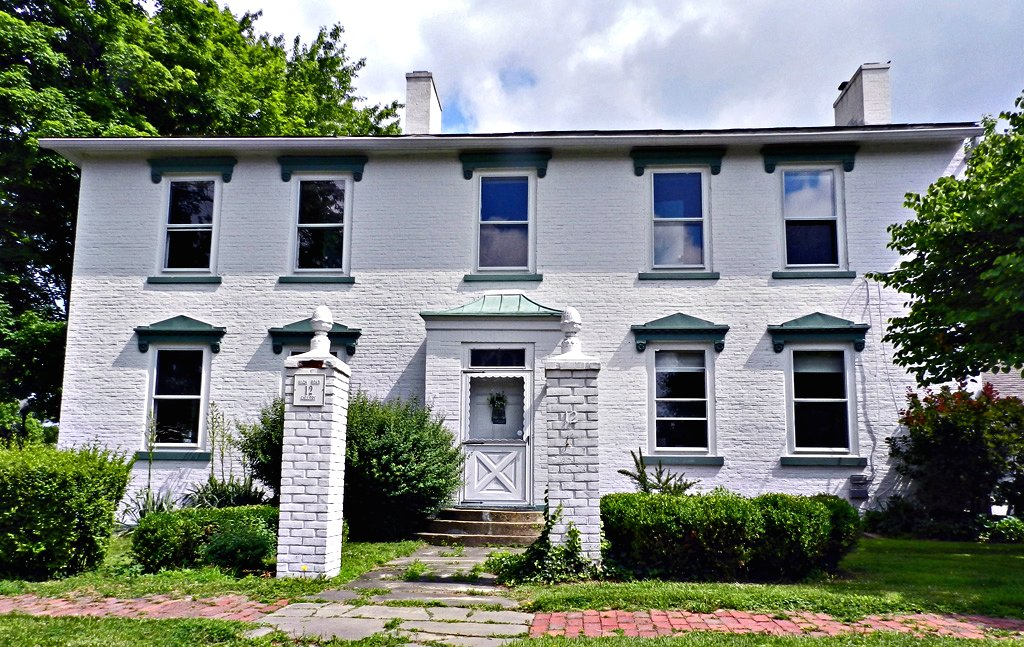
Aurora Buttles House in Worthington, built in 1818

=== Growth ===
On May 24, 1813, James Kilbourne took a seat in the United States House of Representatives.

On August 25, 1817, President James Monroe visited Worthington. Also in 1817, Philander Chase moved to Worthington to become the first rector of St. John's Episcopal Church. He concurrently served as rector of Episcopal churches in Columbus and Delaware and as principal of the Worthington Academy. In June 1818, Rev. Chase was elected Bishop of the newly organized Episcopal Diocese of Ohio. Chase initially founded Kenyon College in Worthington.

The period from the 1820s to the Civil War was a time of slow growth for the sleepy village. In 1820, Aurora Buttles erected a Masonic hall. In 1826 the Columbus and Sandusky Turnpike was incorporated (now U.S. Route 23) to connect the center of the state to Lake Erie, further cementing the importance of High Street.

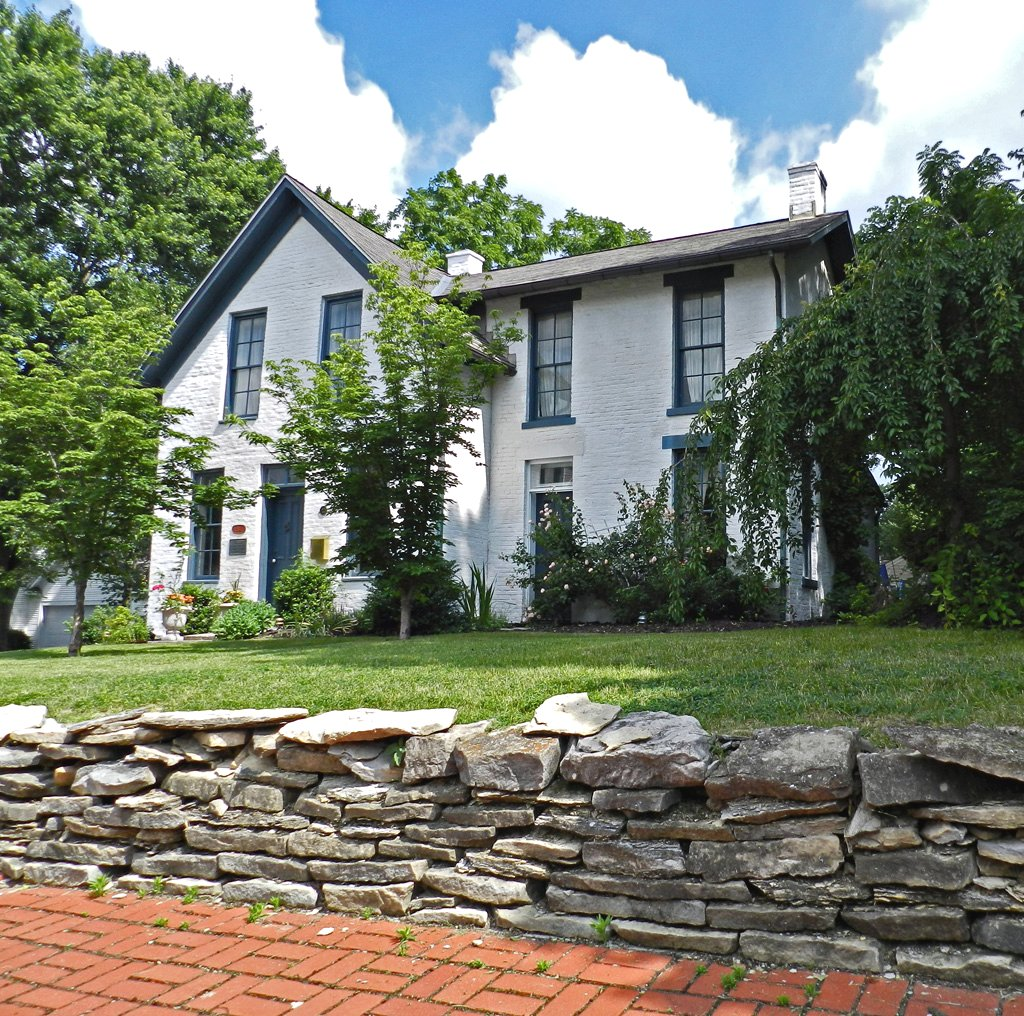
Louis Noble House, built in 1863

=== Civil War ===
In September, 1861 Captain William Pinney and 14 members of the "Olentangy Reserves" mustered into Company E of Thomas Worthington Jr.'s 46th Ohio Volunteer Infantry, which trained at Camp Lyon on the old Worthington Manufacturing Co. site southwest of the village. This unit suffered forty percent casualties at the Battle of Shiloh in April 1862.

On April 29, 1865, at Appx 6:50 AM, President Abraham Lincoln's funeral train passed through Worthington en route to the Ohio Statehouse in Columbus.

=== Post-war growth ===
In 1866 the Bishop House was converted to the Union Hotel (Worthington Inn) by the Lewis family. In 1873 the Worthington School located at Evening Street and State Route 161 was completed. The first Worthington High School class graduated in 1880 (including 2 girls).

In 1931, the only Roman Catholic pontifical college outside of Italy, the Pontifical College Josephinum relocated just north of Worthington where it exists today.

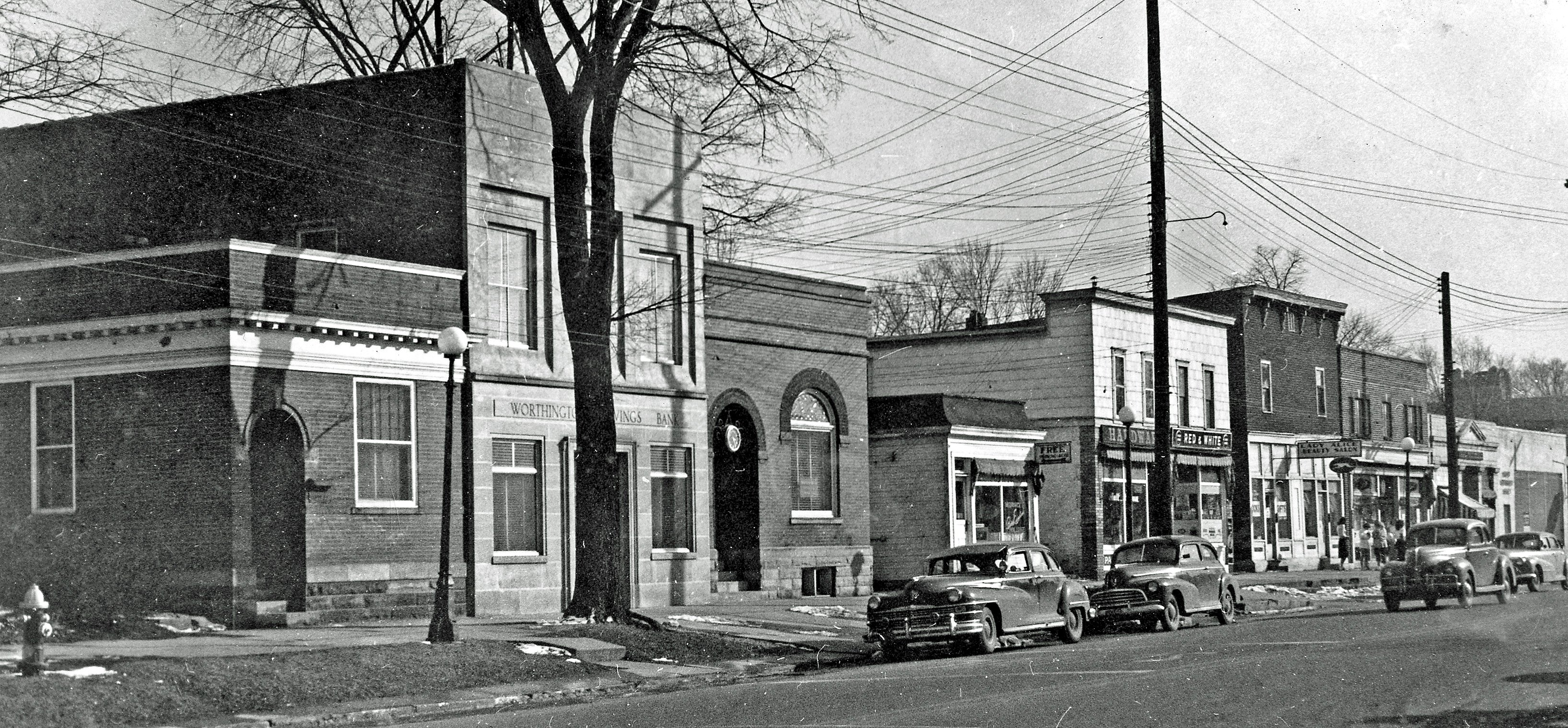
High Street in 1948

== Geography ==
Worthington is located at 40°5′29″N 83°1′15″W (40.091513, -83.020905).

According to the United States Census Bureau, the city has a total area of 5.63 square miles (14.58 km^{2}), of which 5.55 square miles (14.37 km^{2}) is land and 0.08 square miles (0.21 km^{2}) is water.

The cities of Worthington and Riverlea form an enclave of Columbus.

Highways that pass through or adjacent to Worthington include Interstate 270, United States Route 23, Ohio State Route 161, and Ohio State Route 315.

Interstate 71 and Ohio State Route 710 pass just to the east of the city.

Except for a small border with Perry Township (Brookside Estates) on the west, Worthington is completely surrounded by Columbus.

Western Worthington now includes part of what used to be Linworth, and is home to the Linworth Alternative Program school.

== Demographics ==
Historical population
Census	Pop.	Note	%±
1840	440		—
1850	484		10.0%
1860	356		−26.4%
1880	459		—
1890	341		−25.7%
1900	443		29.9%
1910	547		23.5%
1920	705		28.9%
1930	1,239		75.7%
1940	1,569		26.6%
1950	2,141		36.5%
1960	9,239		331.5%
1970	15,326		65.9%
1980	14,956		−2.4%
1990	14,869		−0.6%
2000	14,125		−5.0%
2010	13,575		−3.9%
2020	14,786		8.9%
Sources: 2020

=== 2020 census ===
As of the 2020 census, Worthington had a population of 14,786. The median age was 42.1 years. 24.8% of residents were under the age of 18 and 21.5% of residents were 65 years of age or older. For every 100 females there were 91.3 males, and for every 100 females age 18 and over there were 86.4 males age 18 and over.

100.0% of residents lived in urban areas, while 0.0% lived in rural areas.

There were 5,866 households in Worthington, of which 34.6% had children under the age of 18 living in them. Of all households, 59.6% were married-couple households, 11.7% were households with a male householder and no spouse or partner present, and 24.9% were households with a female householder and no spouse or partner present. About 25.6% of all households were made up of individuals and 14.2% had someone living alone who was 65 years of age or older.

There were 6,119 housing units, of which 4.1% were vacant. The homeowner vacancy rate was 0.7% and the rental vacancy rate was 5.5%.

Racial composition as of the 2020 census
Race	Number	Percent
White	13,042	88.2%
Black or African American	443	3.0%
American Indian and Alaska Native	13	0.1%
Asian	342	2.3%
Native Hawaiian and Other Pacific Islander	2	0.0%
Some other race	130	0.9%
Two or more races	814	5.5%
Hispanic or Latino (of any race)	352	2.4%

=== 2010 census ===
As of the census of 2010, there were 13,575 people, 5,691 households, and 3,874 families living in the city. The population density was 2,445.9 inhabitants per square mile (944.4/km^{2}). There were 5,940 housing units at an average density of 1,070.3 per square mile (413.2/km^{2}). The racial makeup of the city was 93.0% White, 2.2% African American, 2.3% Asian, 0.5% from other races, and 2.0% from two or more races. Hispanic or Latino of any race were 1.7% of the population.

There were 5,691 households, of which 30.8% had children under the age of 18 living with them, 57.6% were married couples living together, 7.7% had a female householder with no husband present, 2.7% had a male householder with no wife present, and 31.9% were non-families. 28.0% of all households were made up of individuals, and 13.3% had someone living alone who was 65 years of age or older. The average household size was 2.35 and the average family size was 2.88.

The median age in the city was 44.9 years. 23.2% of residents were under the age of 18; 4.5% were between the ages of 18 and 24; 22.6% were from 25 to 44; 30.7% were from 45 to 64; and 19.1% were 65 years of age or older. The gender makeup of the city was 47.2% male and 52.8% female.

=== 2000 census ===
As of the census of 2000, there were 14,125 people, 5,692 households, and 4,052 families living in the city. The population density was 2,494.6 inhabitants per square mile (963.2/km^{2}). There were 5,845 housing units at an average density of 1,032.3 per square mile (398.6/km^{2}). The racial makeup of the city was 93.97% White, 1.71% African American, 0.12% Native American, 2.77% Asian, 0.01% Pacific Islander, 0.22% from other races, and 1.21% from two or more races. Hispanic or Latino of any race were 0.98% of the population.

There were 5,692 households, out of which 31.4% had children under the age of 18 living with them, 62.0% were married couples living together, 7.2% had a female householder with no husband present, and 28.8% were non-families. 25.7% of all households were made up of individuals, and 11.8% had someone living alone who was 65 years of age or older. The average household size was 2.42 and the average family size was 2.92.

In the city the population was spread out, with 23.9% under the age of 18, 4.9% from 18 to 24, 23.1% from 25 to 44, 29.7% from 45 to 64, and 18.4% who were 65 years of age or older. The median age was 44 years. For every 100 females, there were 88.2 males. For every 100 females age 18 and over, there were 82.6 males.

The median income for a household in the city was $68,568, and the median income for a family was $83,074. Males had a median income of $59,258 versus $39,424 for females. The per capita income for the city was $34,495. About 1.4% of families and 2.5% of the population were below the poverty line, including 2.4% of those under age 18 and 4.5% of those age 65 or over.

== Library ==
The Worthington Public Library serves the community with three branches. In 2015, the library loaned more than 3.2 million items to its 79,500 cardholders, making it one of the busiest libraries in Ohio. Total printed materials held are over 473,000 volumes with 20,000 print subscriptions. It is also the first unionized library in central Ohio, currently represented by The Ohio Federation of Teachers.

== Transportation ==
Worthington's downtown centers around the intersection of Ohio State Route 161 and U.S. Route 23. In addition, the 315 expressway and Interstate 71 flank Worthington's west and east ends respectively, and Worthington is accessible by Interstate 270, a ring road surrounding Columbus which itself cuts through the northern end of Worthington.

Public transport is minimal in Worthington, though the Central Ohio Transit Authority operates bus line 102 along High Street. The only rail transport near Worthington is a Norfolk Southern Railway line parallel to I-71.

The Ohio State University Airport is the nearest general aviation airport to the city, and passengers are served by Columbus's two airports: John Glenn Columbus International Airport and Rickenbacker International Airport.

== Education ==
Worthington Kilbourne High School

Worthington Schools operates public schools.

Thomas Worthington High School and Worthington Kilbourne High School are the high schools of the city. The Linworth Alternative Program also operates within the city.

The office of the Columbus Japanese Language School, a weekend supplementary Japanese school, is located in Worthington. The classes are held in Marysville. Previously classes were held at Worthington school district facilities.

The Ohio Contemporary Chinese School (OCCS, simplified Chinese: 俄州现代中文学校; traditional Chinese: 俄州現代中文學校; pinyin: Ézhōu Xiàndài Zhōngwén Xuéxiào) is located in the area, holding classes at Worthington Kilbourne. It serves the Chinese American community.

St. Michael's, a private Roman Catholic school, was founded in Worthington in 1954.

== Notable people ==
- Andrew Anglin, founder of white-supremacist website The Daily Stormer.
- Gary Berry, Green Bay Packer defensive back
- Earle Bruce, Ohio State University football coach
- Casey Close, Sports agent
- Dieter Cunz and Oskar Seidlin, professors, openly gay couple 1957-1969
- Susan Diol, actress
- Colin Gawel, lead singer and guitarist of Watershed
- Maggie Grace, actress
- Rachael Harris, actress and comedian
- John Wesley Hoyt, third Governor of Wyoming Territory
- Pat McCrory, longest-serving mayor of Charlotte, North Carolina
- Eldon Miller, OSU basketball coach
- Betty Montgomery, Former Ohio Attorney General and Auditor
- J. R. Niklos, NFL fullback
- Danny O'Rourke, MLS soccer player
- Christopher Paul, al Qaeda terrorist
- Troy Perkins, former professional soccer goalkeeper and 2006 MLS Goalkeeper of the Year
- Michael R. Perry, Emmy Award-winning television and film writer
- Jack Plotnick, actor
- Roswell S. Ripley, Confederate brigadier general who fought in the Civil War
- Claire Shipman, ABC news correspondent
- J. K. Simmons, Academy Award-winning actor
- Jeff Smith, Cartoonist, writer and illustrator of Bone comics
- Nick Swisher, former MLB baseball player
- Dana Tyler, New York City's CBS news anchor

== See also ==
- Colonial Hills
- Ohio Railway Museum
- Rush Creek Village
- Worthington Christian High School
- Worthington Industries
