= St. Luke's Episcopal Church (Granville, Ohio) =

Historic church in Ohio, United States

- U.S. National Register of Historic Places
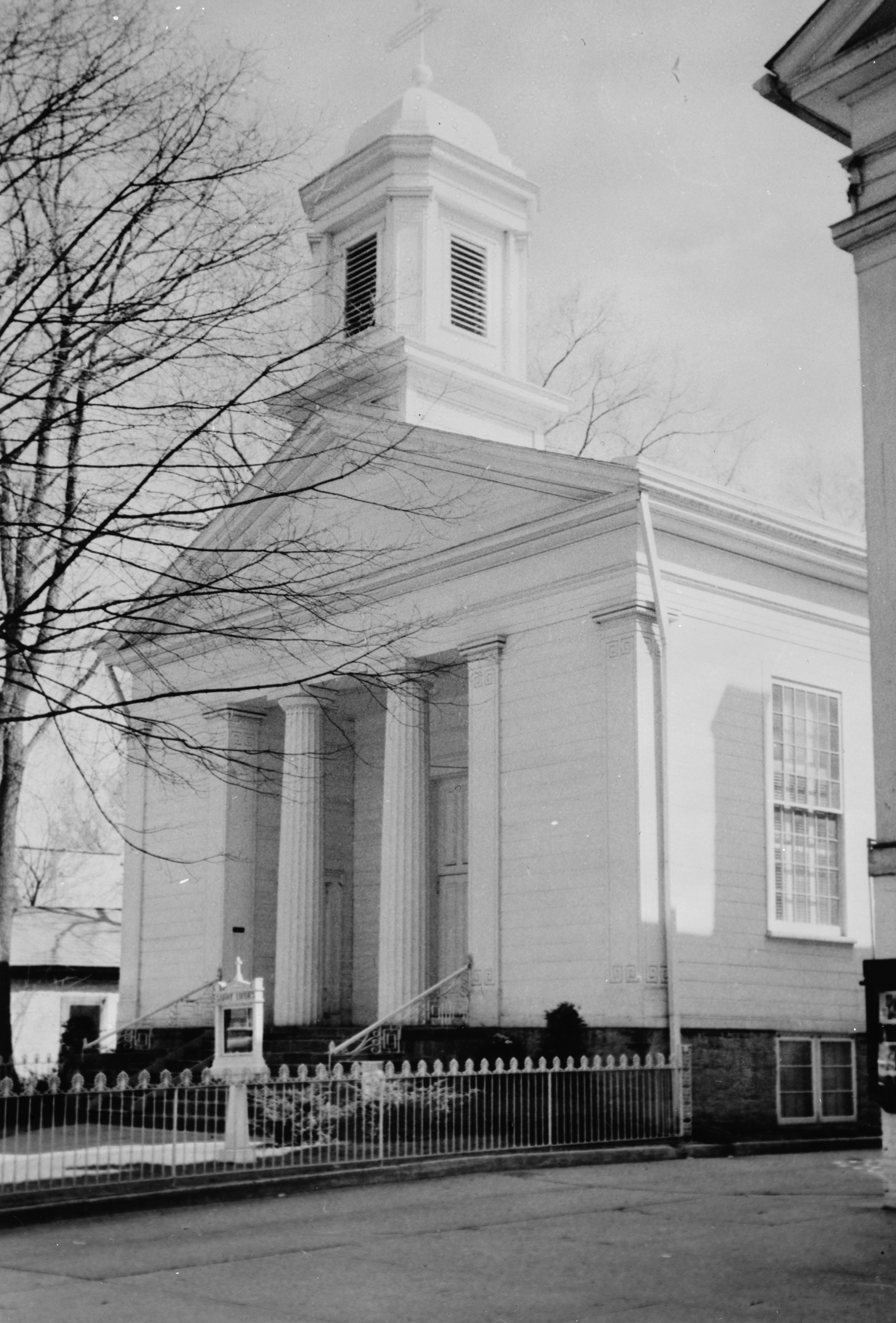
- HABS photo from 1952

- Location within Ohio Location within the United States
- Location: 111 E. Broadway St., Granville, Ohio
- Coordinates: 40°4′3″N 82°31′11″W
- Area: less than one acre
- Built: 1837
- Architect: Benjamin Morgan; Minard Lafever
- Architectural style: Greek Revival
- NRHP reference No.: 76001465
- Added to NRHP: April 26, 1976

The St. Luke's Episcopal Church in Granville, Ohio is a historic church located at 111 E. Broadway Street in Granville. It is a congregation of the Episcopal Diocese of Southern Ohio.

In 2017, the church reported 403 members; in 2023, it reported 135 members. No membership statistics were reported in 2024 national parochial reports. Plate and pledge financial support reported by the church in 2023 was $220,538. Average Sunday Attendance (ASA) reported in 2024 was 31 persons. This was a relative decrease on ASA of 174 in 2016.

The Rev. Julia Joyce-Miesse is the 22nd rector of St. Luke's Church.

== Building and history ==
The Greek Revival church building was constructed in 1837. It was added to the National Register of Historic Places in 1976.

Its 1976 National Register nomination says: "St. Luke's Episcopal Church is one of the finest examples of Greek revival architecture in the United States today," and notes that the building is in excellent condition, in its original form from 1837.

Its exterior was designed for Alfred Avery by England-born Benjamin Morgan (1808–1851). Morgan also designed the Greek Revival Avery-Hunter House in Granville for the same client. "St. Luke's is his main claim to fame and he requested to be buried from this church. He also submitted plans for the State Capitol in Columbus and was a consultant in its building. The ceiling and all lathing and plastering was done by Orren Bryant of Alexandria, Ohio. He was a farmer and also very skilled plasterer. He worked during the winter of 1838 on the moldings and cornices of deep relief and rich design."

Its interior was designed by renowned New York-based architect Minard Lafever, who provided specific designs for this church, and also was widely influential through his publication of pattern books.

The bell tower design was an adaptation by Benjamin Morgan of works by Asher Benjamin in the Connecticut River Valley, derived from designs in Asher Benjamin's books for workmen and builders.

It was documented by the Historic American Buildings Survey in 1934.
