= Southland (jazz venue) =

Coordinates: 42°21′00″N 71°03′58″W

Southland was a ballroom/cafe on Warrenton Street in Boston, in the United States, in what is now the Charles Playhouse. Originally a church, converted into a club, is best known for featuring prominent jazz artists of the 1930s and 1940s such as Count Basie (most associated with the club), Duke Ellington, Cab Calloway, Jimmie Lunceford, and many others. Southland was connected to the radio and it became a notable venue for broadcasting jazz over the radio in the 1940s. On 19 February 1940, Count Basie and his Orchestra opened a four-week engagement at Southland which was broadcast on 20 February. Southland's entertainment also featured dancers such as Rubberlegs Williams, who also sang with Basie on numerous occasions.

Today the building is occupied by the Charles Playhouse, which opened in 1957.
