= Rubberlegs Williams =

American jazz musician

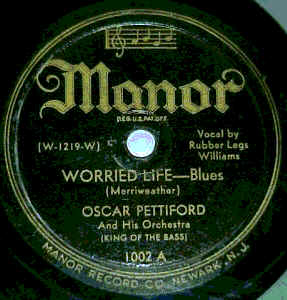
Oscar Pettiford, "Worried Life Blues", 1945

Henry "Rubberlegs" Williams (July 14, 1907 – October 17, 1962) was an American blues and jazz singer, dancer and occasional female impersonator. A star of Vaudeville, he is probably best remembered for his singing work with Charlie Parker and Dizzy Gillespie, although it was his dancing for which he was renowned in New York City and Boston.

== Biography ==
Williams was born in Atlanta in 1907. He became employed as dancer with Bobby Grant's Female Impersonators in 1919 and became a spectacle. He later won several Cakewalk and Charleston competitions and other dancing contests and achieved success in Vaudeville, going on tours with the Theater Owners Booking Association. He got his nickname "Rubberlegs" because he danced as if he had legs made of rubber. In 1933 he appeared in the short film Smash Your Baggage, and appeared in shows like the "Cotton Club Parade" and "Blackbirds of 1933". He was a regular performer at The Cotton Club and the Apollo in Harlem, and at the Southland ballroom in Boston, and according to Count Basie, he became the venue's most prominent attraction with his elaborates dances. He also appeared as a singer with prominent artists such Count Basie Orchestra, Fletcher Henderson, Chick Webb and Charlie Parker, and sang on the first recording of Dizzy Gillespie's "Hot House" on April 1, 1945 in New York City.

On Williams' April 24, 1945 Savoy studio session, Miles Davis played the trumpet for the first time on a recording. The session resulted in two singles: Savoy 564 "That's The Stuff You Gotta Watch / Pointless Mama Blues" and Savoy 5516 "Deep Sea Blues / Bring It On Home". These songs were later re-released in 1990 on a compilation album, First Miles.

A larger than life character both on and off stage, Williams was seen as the "embodiment of the raucous style that had dominated the black variety stage" at the time. During a January 1945 recording session with Continental, he once screeched his way through a session after becoming "wildly disoriented after unwittingly ingesting an enormous dose of Benzedrine", after Charlie Parker spiked his coffee with three tablets. However, Williams stood out in the jazz community for refusing to consume alcohol, smoke or take drugs which made him highly respected and liked, especially among the black community of New York City. He was also not especially keen with the development of bebop's "off playing", and once memorably barked at Dizzy Gillespie during his intoxicated recording session: "Miss Gillespie, if you play another of them bad notes, I'm gonna beat your brains out".

Williams died in New York City in October 1962.
