= Garden Theater Block =

- U.S. National Register of Historic Places
- U.S. Historic district – Contributing property
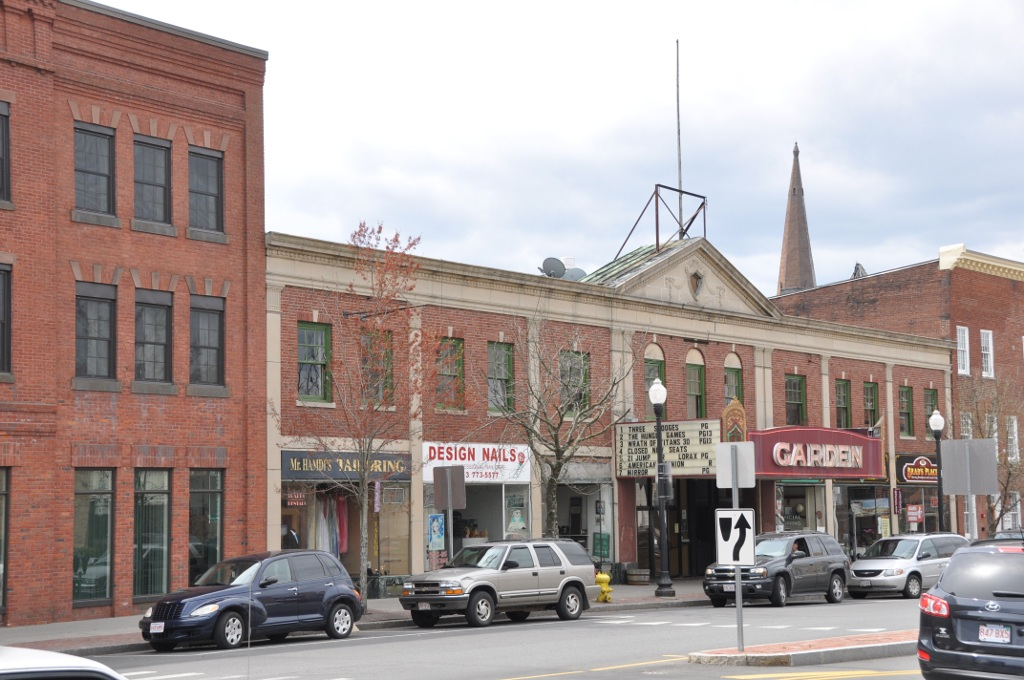

- Location within Massachusetts Location within the United States
- Location: 353-367 Main St., Greenfield, Massachusetts
- Coordinates: 42°35′15″N 72°36′1″W
- Area: less than one acre
- Built: 1928
- Built by: George H. Reed
- Architect: Mowll & Rand
- Architectural style: Colonial Revival
- Part of: Main Street Historic District (ID88001908)
- NRHP reference No.: 83000591

Significant dates
- Added to NRHP: September 1, 1983
- Designated CP: October 13, 1988

The Garden Theater Block is a historic commercial block and theater at 353-367 Main Street in Greenfield, Massachusetts. The Colonial Revival block was completed in 1929, and is home to the city's largest theatrical performance venue. The theater is a unique example of an "atmospheric" garden theater, with artwork and mechanical systems designed to give its interior an outside appearance. The building was listed on the National Register of Historic Places in 1983, and included in the Main Street Historic District in 1988. The theater is now known as the Greenfield Garden Cinemas.

== Description and history ==
The Garden Theater Block is located on the south side of Main Street in downtown Greenfield, just east of Bank Row. It is a steel-framed structure, with a two-story front section finished in brick and stone with Colonial Revival styling. The facade is divided into seven sections, articulated by stone pilasters. The outer sections are all commercial storefronts, with recessed entrances flanked by display windows on the ground floor, and two sash windows on the upper level. The central bay houses the theater entrance, which is deeply recessed and sheltered by a large marquee. The windows above the marquee are topped by rounded blinds, and the bay is capped by a gable. The interior of the theater is richly decorated with garden-themed carpeting and murals of New England scenes by noted theater muralist Frederick Marshall. The ceiling includes lighting panels designed to simulate stars, some of which twinkle, and there is machinery for simulating the movement of clouds across the ceiling.

The theater was built in 1928-29 to a design by Mowll & Rand of Boston for the Goldman family who owned a theater chain across western Massachusetts. It was at the time the third theater in Greenfield, and its largest. Although it was designed for both film and live performance, it only sporadically showed vaudeville productions before being dedicated entirely to films. The theater was operated by the Goldman family for 70 years, closing in 1999. The city thereafter took the property in a tax proceeding, but the Goldmans were able to recover it through further legal action. The theater was then divided into seven smaller theaters, and its murals were covered over. The Goldmans leased the theater operation out, and the lessees acquired the property in 2008, with further plans for rehabilitation.

== See also ==
- National Register of Historic Places listings in Franklin County, Massachusetts
