= Granville, Ohio =

- Village
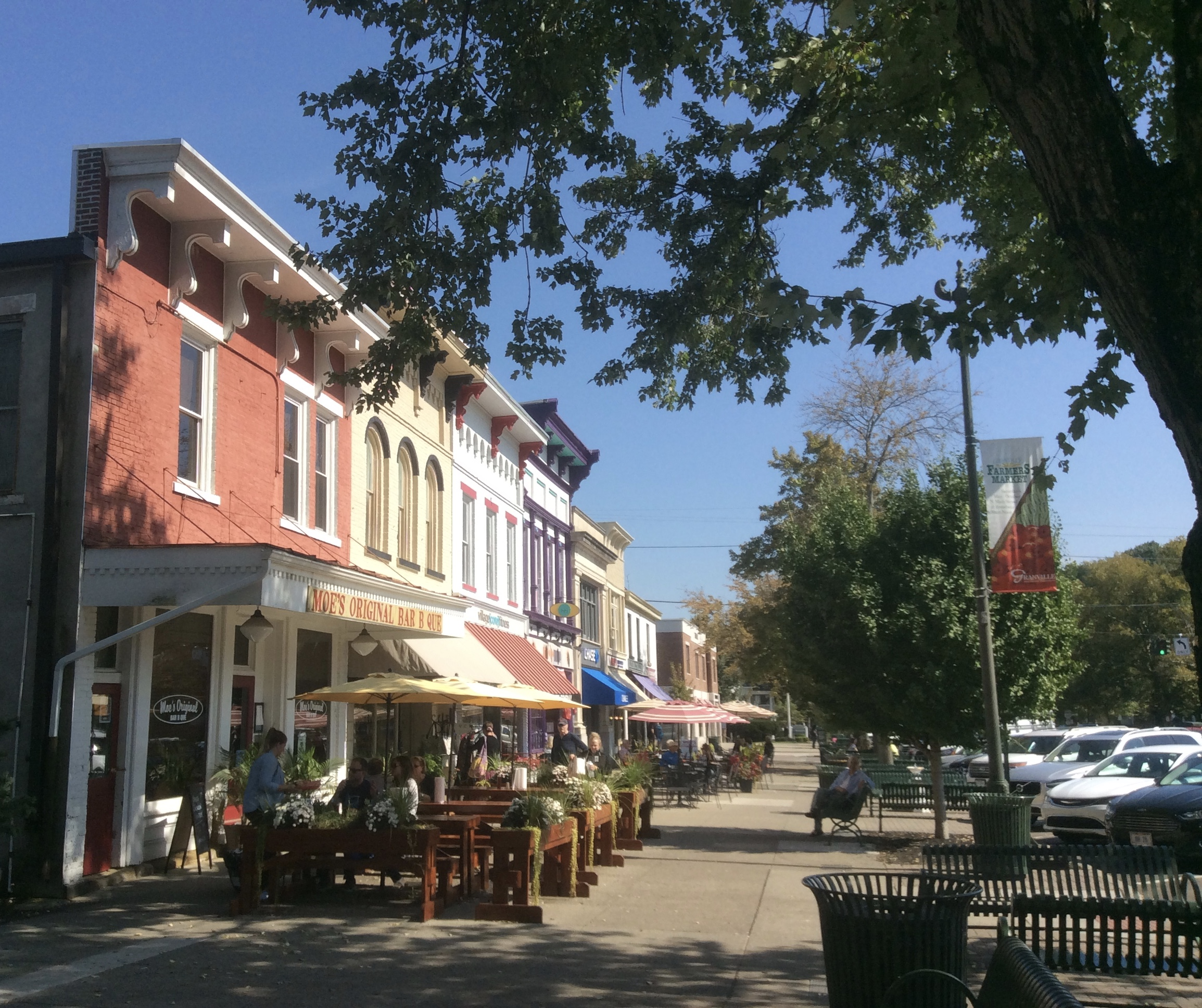
- Granville streetscape
- Motto: "One of Ohio's Best Hometowns"
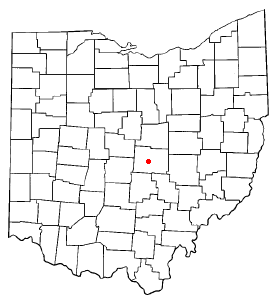
- Location of Granville, Ohio

- Location within Licking County
- Coordinates: 40°03′50″N 82°30′44″W
- Country: United States
- State: Ohio
- County: Licking

Government
  - Mayor: Melissa Hartfield

Area
  - Total: 4.86 sq mi (12.58 km^{2})
  - Land: 4.81 sq mi (12.46 km^{2})
  - Water: 0.046 sq mi (0.12 km^{2})
- Elevation: 997 ft (304 m)

Population (2020)
  - Total: 5,946
  - Estimate (2023): 6,281
  - Density: 1,236.4/sq mi (477.36/km^{2})
- Time zone: UTC-5 (Eastern (EST))
  - Summer (DST): UTC-4 (EDT)
- ZIP code: 43023
- Area code: 740
- FIPS code: 39-31402
- GNIS feature ID: 2398193
- Website: www.granville.oh.us

Granville is a village in Licking County, Ohio, United States. The population was 5,946 at the 2020 census. The village is located in a rural area of hills, known locally as the Welsh Hills, in central Ohio. It is 35 miles (56 km) east of Columbus, the state capital, and 7 miles (11 km) west of Newark, the county seat.

The village began as a settlement by European-Americans of Welsh descent. It has long served as a hub for education in the area. It also served as a hotbed for Temperance Movement and Abolitionist activity.

Granville is home to Denison University. The village has a number of historic buildings, including Greek Revival structures like the Avery Downer House, St. Luke's Episcopal Church (1837) and others. The Buxton Inn (1812), the Granville Inn (1924), Bancroft House (1834) and Bryn Du Mansion are local landmarks.

== History ==
=== Pre-Columbian cultures ===
Granville is the location of the prehistoric Alligator Effigy Mound, built by the indigenous people of the Fort Ancient culture, between 800 and 1200 CE, more than four hundred years before European contact. It may be an effigy of the underwater panther featured in Native American mythology. The mound is listed on the National Register of Historic Places. The area has evidence of Indigenous cultures. Less than five miles from the Alligator Effigy Mound are the Newark Earthworks, associated with the earlier Hopewell culture of roughly 100 BCE to 500 CE.

=== Pioneer settlers ===
Granville was not settled by European Americans until 1805, but the first house was built in 1801 by John Jones, a Welshman born in New Jersey. He erected a small hut with his wife and paved the first street in Granville, calling it Centerville Street. Mr. Jones's close friend Mr. Patrick Cunningham built the second cabin in the township the next spring. People began to settle at the village regularly over the next four years. The first large group of settlers were from Granville, Massachusetts, and they named the new village after their former home. The area was first surveyed by United States representatives in 1797, as land set aside by the national government for payment in land grants to veterans who had served in the Revolutionary War.

Among the earliest settlers were Theophilus Rees and his son John. Born in Wales, they immigrated to the United States in 1795, and headed west for a new life on the American frontier. They arrived in what is now Granville township in 1802, following a brief time in Philadelphia. Other Welsh settlers followed them, leaving their heritage in numerous place names.

=== Early schools ===
Granville's first school was built in January 1806, approximately two months after the first band of settlers arrived. The log structure, which was used as both a school and a church, sat on the south side of the public square. It had windows made of oiled paper and benches and desks made of split logs. This building served as the local school for four to five years until the community build a framed schoolhouse on the east side of the square. By 1820, a three-story brick schoolhouse had been built. Because there were not enough students to fill it, only the main floor was used for educational purposes; the basement served as a market, and a Masonic fraternity used the upper floor. In 1854, the village built the Union School, which served as a district school and accommodated about 200 students.

Throughout the 19th century, Granville's residents established a number of academies and seminaries (institutions of secondary education similar to high schools).

- Granville Academy / Doane Academy: Built in 1827 by the Congregational Church, Granville Academy was initially open to both males and females, but by the time it was incorporated by the Ohio Legislature in 1836, it served only women. The preparatory school changed its name to Doane Academy when it moved onto Denison University's campus 1894. The academy closed in 1927 due to low enrollment, and the school building now houses Denison University's administrative offices.
- Granville Female Seminary / Episcopal Female Seminary: In 1832, the Baptist Society founded Granville Female Institute, which had a boarding house and educational building on Main Street. In 1840, the school changed ownership and became the Episcopal Female Seminary.
- Ladies' Female Institute / Baptist Female Seminary: The Ladies Female Institute was started in 1860 by Rev. N. S. Buxton and his wife, and it operated out of the basement of the Baptist church. Later, it consolidated with another school and became the Baptist Female Seminary.

The college now known as Denison University first organized in 1831 under the name Granville Literary and Theological Institute. It was located on a 135-acre farm southwest of Granville, where students performed manual labor. The school had four departments: preparatory, English, collegiate, and theological. Its name changed to Granville College in 1845, and in 1855, soon after its name changed to Denison University, the college moved to its current sight on a hill north of the village.

=== Temperance ===
The Temperance Movement, a social and religious movement against the consumption of alcohol, had many supporters in Granville. Jacob Little, a Congregationalist pastor in Granville from the late 1820s to 1866, was a leading advocate for temperance. Little sought to achieve temperance in Granville and dedicated most of his life to achieving this goal. He is well known for writing a large number of pamphlets. Little also presented his ideas on alcohol consumption through his annual New Year's Day Sermons. In these sermons, he would highlight the wrongdoings of Granville members that had occurred throughout the previous year, publicly shaming those who consumed large amounts of alcohol. He continued his fight for temperance for 38 years, but temperance was not implemented in Granville until 1874.

The Granville Women's Temperance League was formed in 1873 and worked to achieve temperance in Granville. In 1874 the Village Council banned the production, sale, and consumption of alcohol. The Granville Women's Temperance League would organize public demonstrations, petitions, and educational campaigns to raise awareness about the harmful effects of alcohol.

Granville's pro-temperance stance played a role in the lynching of Carl Etherington, a 17-year-old Anti-Saloon League agent who was murdered in Newark, Ohio, after taking part in several saloon raids. On July 8, 1910, Granville's mayor, Dr. E.J. Barns, tasked Etherington and at least 18 other hired agents with executing search and seizure warrants for illicit saloons in Newark, Ohio. In the ensuing confrontations between the agents and Newark citizens, Etherington shot a former police captain and bar owner, and he was subsequently chased, beaten, and killed.

The village of Granville remained dry until 1974, 41 years after the Prohibition ended.

=== Abolitionism ===
In the early days of the Abolitionist Movement, Granville was widely divided over the issue of slavery, but abolitionist groups began to grow in size and influence, holding regular meetings and lectures in the village. Oftentimes, these lectures were met with harsh resistance from anti-abolitionist locals, which eventually led to violence. For example, an abolitionist named Mr. Weld attempted to hold a lecture in Granville on April 1, 1835, but he was egged and stoned by townspeople. After multiple instances of these violent outbursts, citizens of Granville began to express apprehension about holding these lectures because of the division and aggression they were causing. With a large lecture scheduled to be held in Granville in April 1836 by an abolitionist group from Cleveland, Ohio, a notice was posted by some Granville residents in the Newark Gazette asking organizers not to hold the meeting in the village. Despite this, the meeting took place on April 27 of that year, and once again, anti-abolitionist townspeople retaliated. Large mobs gathered to egg and stone the lecturers, and even shaved the tails and manes of the horses belonging to the abolitionist group. After the convention, the two factions clashed in the streets, using bats and daggers as weapons. Though no one was killed, many were severely injured.

After this riot, the village's approach towards abolitionism shifted. There was less retaliation out of fear of violence, and abolitionist groups grew in power. This growth led to Granville's participation in the Underground Railroad system, not as a main station, but as an alternative route in the case that routes through Columbus or the surrounding areas were too dangerous. Among few of the most notable railroad operators were Joseph Linnel and Edwin Cooley Wright, who regularly hosted people fleeing from slavery on their farms.

== Geography ==
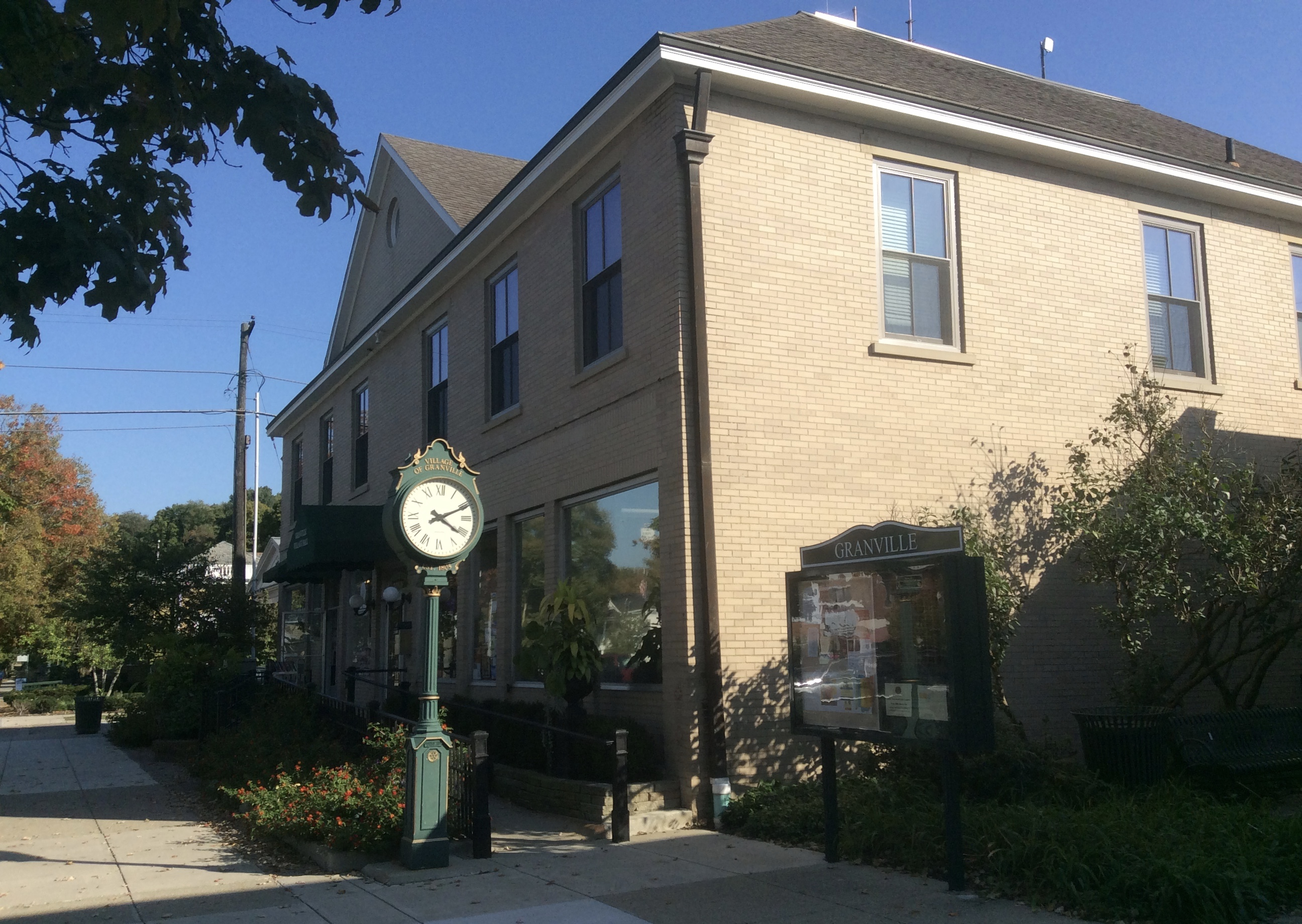
Granville Town Hall

According to the United States Census Bureau, the village has a total area of 4.71 square miles (12.20 km^{2}), of which 4.68 square miles (12.12 km^{2}) is land and 0.03 square miles (0.08 km^{2}) is water.

The central village is situated among three prominent hills. College Hill is to the north. Sugarloaf is a prominent hill and park at the west end of Broadway. Mt. Parnassus is another prominent hill and residential area at the east end of Broadway. A short distance south of the village center is the Raccoon Creek flood plain with the creek running from the west to east.

== Demographics ==
Historical population
Census	Pop.	Note	%±
1820	199		—
1830	362		81.9%
1840	727		100.8%
1850	771		6.1%
1860	801		3.9%
1870	1,109		38.5%
1880	1,127		1.6%
1890	1,366		21.2%
1900	1,425		4.3%
1910	1,394		−2.2%
1920	1,440		3.3%
1930	1,467		1.9%
1940	1,502		2.4%
1950	2,653		76.6%
1960	2,868		8.1%
1970	3,963		38.2%
1980	3,851		−2.8%
1990	4,244		10.2%
2000	3,167		−25.4%
2010	5,646		78.3%
2020	5,946		5.3%
2023 (est.)	6,281	▲	5.6%

=== 2010 census ===
As of the census of 2010, there were 5,646 people, 1,441 households, and 1,017 families living in the village. The population density was 1,206.4 inhabitants per square mile (465.8/km^{2}). There were 1,554 housing units at an average density of 332.1 per square mile (128.2/km^{2}). The racial makeup of the village was 91.9% White, 2.1% African American, 0.1% Native American, 3.6% Asian, 0.6% from other races, and 1.7% from two or more races. Hispanic or Latino of any race were 2.7% of the population.

There were 1,441 households, of which 36.8% had children under the age of 18 living with them, 59.3% were married couples living together, 7.9% had a female householder with no husband present, 3.4% had a male householder with no wife present, and 29.4% were non-families. 25.2% of all households were made up of individuals, and 11.6% had someone living alone who was 65 years of age or older. The average household size was 2.52 and the average family size was 3.05.

The median age in the village was 22 years. 18.1% of residents were under the age of 18; 38.7% were between the ages of 18 and 24; 12.1% were from 25 to 44; 21.4% were from 45 to 64; and 9.6% were 65 years of age or older. The gender makeup of the village was 46.3% male and 53.7% female.

=== 2000 census ===
As of the census of 2000, there were 3,167 people, 1,309 households, and 888 families living in the village. The population density was 790.4 inhabitants per square mile (305.2/km^{2}). There were 1,384 housing units at an average density of 345.4 per square mile (133.4/km^{2}). The racial makeup of the village was 96.75% White, 0.69% African American, 0.28% Native American, 1.01% Asian, 0.16% from other races, and 1.11% from two or more races. Hispanic or Latino of any race were 1.14% of the population.

There were 1,309 households, out of which 33.4% had children under the age of 18 living with them, 60.4% were married couples living together, 6.3% had a female householder with no husband present, and 32.1% were non-families. 28.5% of all households were made up of individuals, and 12.3% had someone living alone who was 65 years of age or older. The average household size was 2.42 and the average family size was 3.00.

In the village, the population was spread out, with 27.0% under the age of 18, 4.4% from 18 to 24, 25.2% from 25 to 44, 28.8% from 45 to 64, and 14.7% who were 65 years of age or older. The median age was 42 years. For every 100 females there were 94.5 males. For every 100 females age 18 and over, there were 87.7 males.

The median income for a household in the village was $67,689, and the median income for a family was $102,885 . Males had a median income of $72,250 versus $46,484 for females. The per capita income for the village was $39,221. About 3.9% of families and 3.8% of the population were below the poverty line, including none of those under age 18 and 4.8% of those age 65 or over.

== Culture ==
=== Religion ===
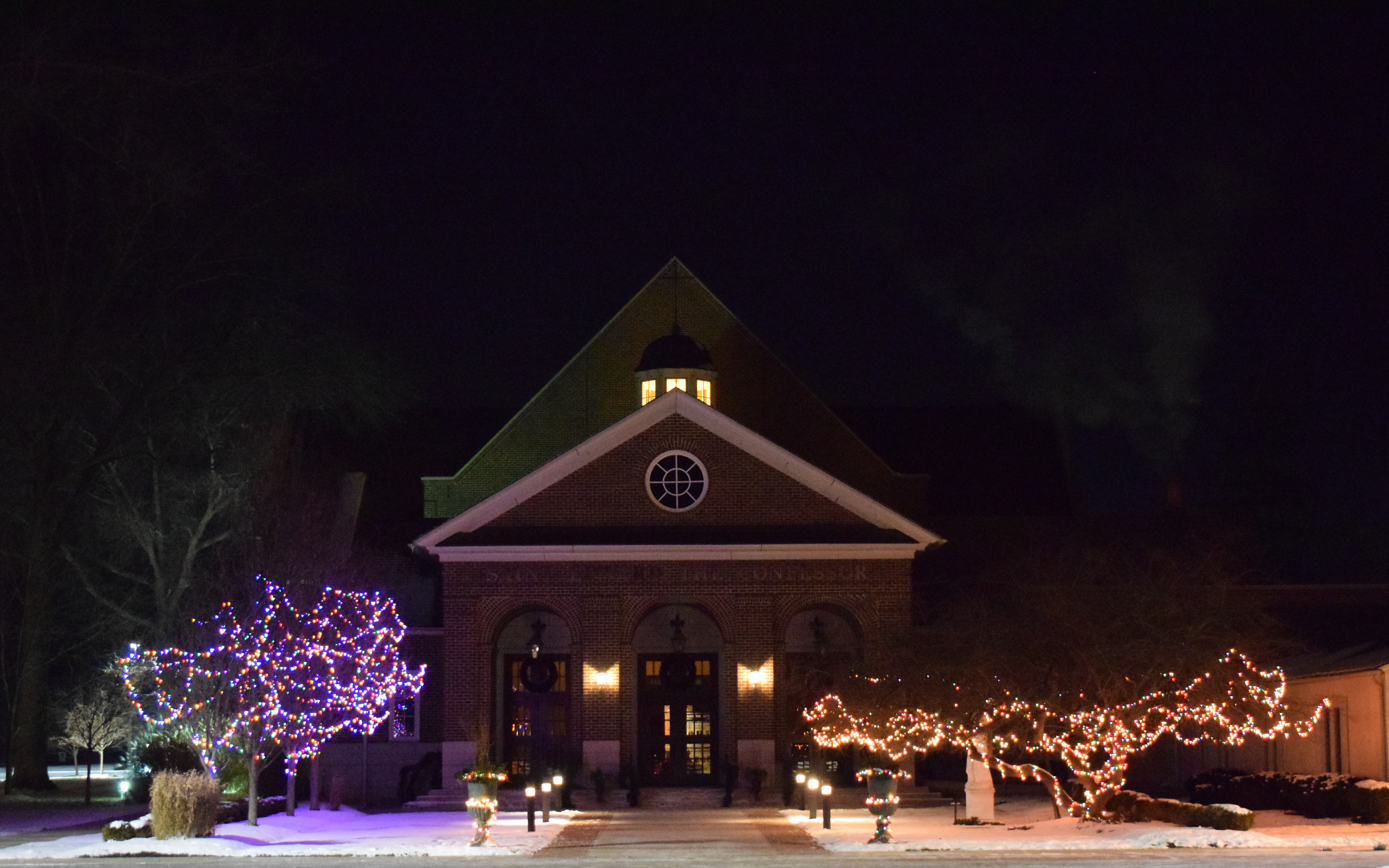
St. Edward the Confessor Church with Christmas decoration

Granville has a long history of being home to the administrative center of the American Baptist Church in Ohio. Formerly known as the Ohio Baptist Convention, the American Baptist Churches of Ohio's office remains located in the village. Denison University was founded as a Baptist college and had a long association with the church. Like other Ohio independent colleges founded in the nineteenth century by religious denominations, the significance of Denison's church affiliation faded and today the university is a non-sectarian institution.

== Education ==
=== Village schools ===
Granville's public schools are operated by the Granville Exempted Village School District. The system includes, Granville High School(grades 9-12), Granville Middle School(grades 7-8), Granville Intermediate School(grades 4-6), and Granville Elementary School(grades k-3). The high school's graduating class of 2025 included 203 students. The district receives strong performance rankings from the Ohio Department of Education Located in the village is the Granville Christian Academy serving K-12 students. Also, there are several private preschools.

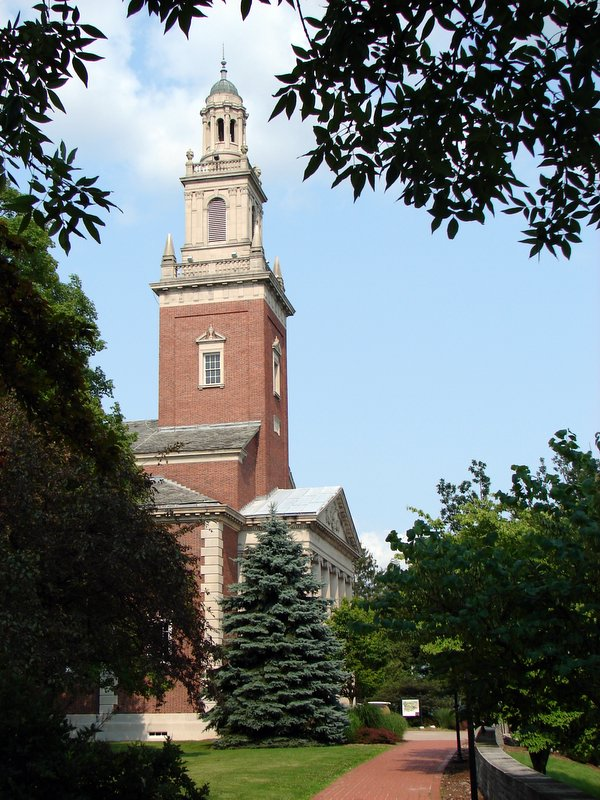
Swasey Chapel at Denison University

=== Denison University ===
Denison University was founded in 1831 as the Granville Theological and Literary Seminary, originally affiliated with the Northern Baptist Convention. Denison is currently a private, residential, non-sectarian liberal arts college with a student body of about 2,300 and a faculty of 235. The school is accredited by the Higher Learning Commission and is certified by the Ohio Board of Regents to grant Bachelor of Arts, Bachelor of Science and Bachelor of Fine Arts degrees. 74% of the student body comes from out of state, including representatives from forty countries. The Homestead at Denison University is a residential student intentional community focusing on environmental sustainability. Swasey Chapel is the iconic campus structure. Completed in 1924, the chapel is named in honor of Ambrose Swasey, a benefactor to the college and prominent Cleveland inventor and businessman.

== Notable people ==
- Hubert Howe Bancroft, an American historian and ethnologist
- Ernest DeWitt Burton, an American biblical scholar and president of the University of Chicago
- Paul Carpenter, a minor league baseball player
- Edward Andrew Deeds, inventor and industrialist
- Edmund Burke Fairfield, American minister, educator and politician in the U.S. state of Michigan.
- Lottie Estelle Granger, educator
- Marie Harf, political commentator, former Senior Advisor for Strategic Communications to U.S. Secretary of State
- Ellen Hayes, astronomer and mathematician
- Woody Hayes, a graduate of and football coach for Denison University and coach at Ohio State University
- George Jones, co-founder of the New York Times
- Rob Mounsey, composer and arranger
- Lea Ann Parsley, Olympic silver medalist in the women's skeleton at the 2002 Winter Olympics
- Marcus Aurelius Root, leading daguerreotypist and author
- Alan Schaaf, founder of Imgur, an image sharing website
- Brian Unger, named one of Entertainment Weekly's "100 Most Creative People in Entertainment" in 1998
- Willard Warner, a brigadier general in the Union Army during the American Civil War
- Scott Wiper, writer and director

== See also ==
- Granville Sentinel
