= Granville Sentinel =

- Type: Weekly newspaper
- Owner: Gannett Company, Inc.
- Editor: Craig McDonald
- Language: English
- Circulation: 2,300 Copies
- Sister newspapers: Newark Advocate
- Website: http://www.granvillesentinel.com/

The Granville Sentinel is an English weekly newspaper in Granville, Ohio that covers general news.
