= Leavitt–Hovey House =

Historic house in Massachusetts, United States

- U.S. National Register of Historic Places
- U.S. Historic district – Contributing property
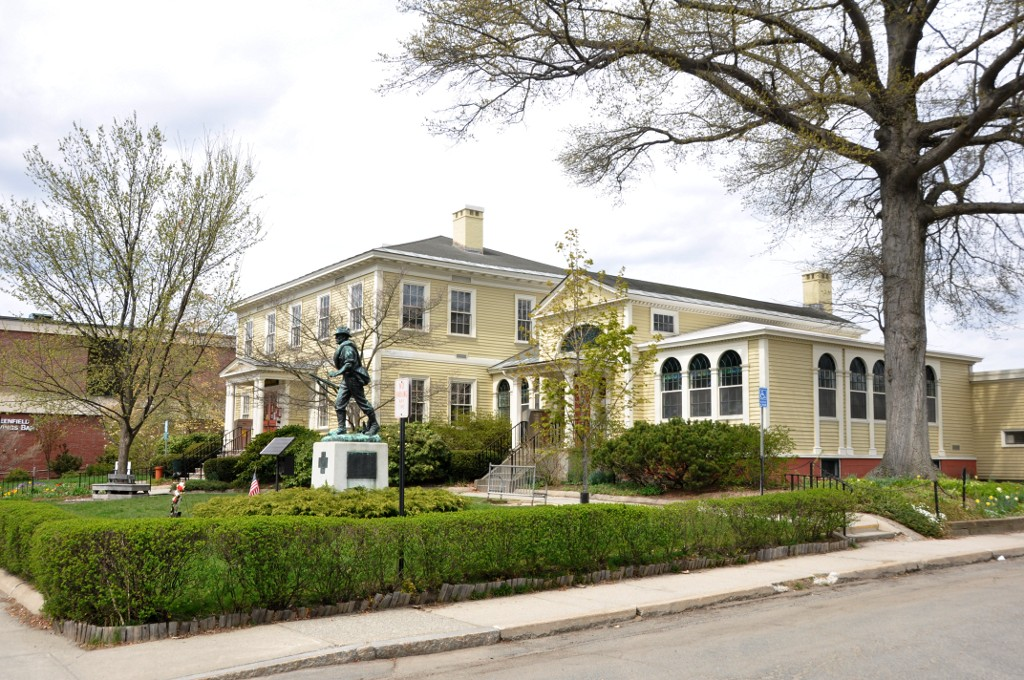

- Location within Massachusetts Location within the United States
- Location: Greenfield, Massachusetts
- Coordinates: 42°35′17″N 72°35′58″W
- Built: 1797
- Architect: Asher Benjamin
- Architectural style: Classical Revival
- Part of: Main Street Historic District (ID88001908)
- NRHP reference No.: 83003977

Significant dates
- Added to NRHP: December 22, 1983
- Designated CP: October 13, 1988

The Leavitt–Hovey House is an historic house located at 402 Main Street in Greenfield, Massachusetts. Built in 1797, it is a prominent work of local architect Asher Benjamin, and a good local example of Federal period architecture. From 1909 to June 17, 2023, it served as the home of the Greenfield Public Library. It was listed on the National Register of Historic Places in 1983, and was included in the Main Street Historic District in 1988.

== Description ==
The Leavitt–Hovey House stands in downtown Greenfield, on the north side of Main Street east of the main business district and opposite Hope Street. It is a two-story wood-frame structure, with numerous additions to its sides and rear. The main block is topped by a hip roof, with two interior chimneys. Its exterior is finished in wooden clapboards. The front facade is five bays wide, with a center entrance sheltered by a gabled porch supported by clustered columns. Front-gabled wings are attached to each side at a recess, with similar styling.

== History ==
The house was designed architect Asher Benjamin in 1797 for Judge Jonathan Leavitt. Leavitt was a graduate of Yale College. He began his career as an attorney in Greenfield. He later served as Judge of the Court of Common Pleas in 1812, and Judge of Probate from 1814 to 1821, as well as the first president of the Franklin Bank of Greenfield. He used the west wing of this house as an office for his business activities. Judge Leavitt married the daughter of Yale President Ezra Stiles.

Some original architectural elements of the Leavitt–Hovey House are in the collection of Historic Deerfield in Deerfield, where they may be seen by appointment.

The town of Greenfield took the home by eminent domain in 1907, and in 1909 moved the Greenfield Public Library into the building until June 2023, when the library moved to its new home at 412 Main Street.

== See also ==
- National Register of Historic Places listings in Franklin County, Massachusetts
