= Charles Playhouse =

Theater in Boston, Massachusetts, United States

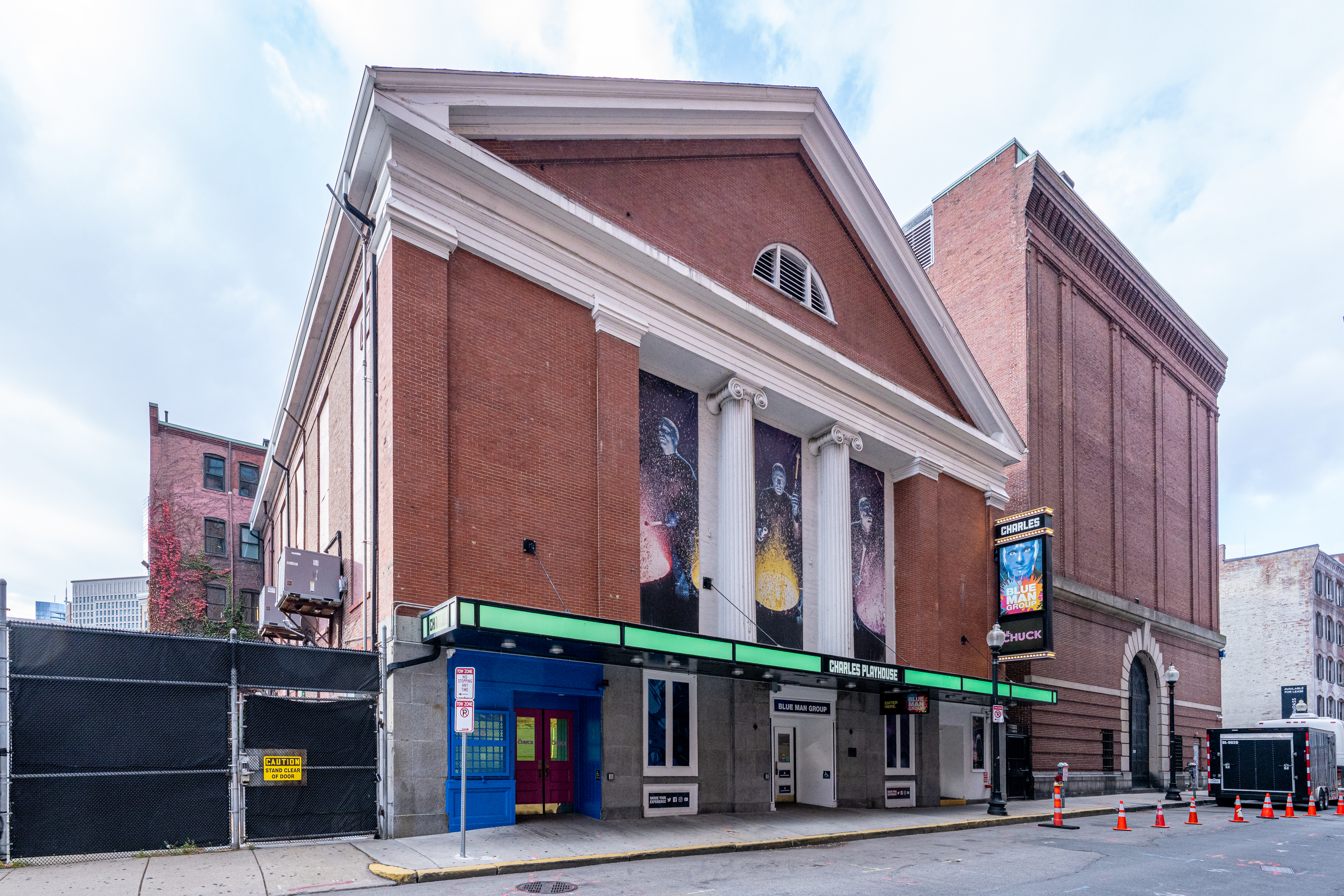
- (2025)
- Interactive map of Charles Playhouse
- Address: Boston, Massachusetts; United States
- Owner: John Gore Organization
- Capacity: 500 (main stage); 200 (second stage)
- Production: Blue Man Group and stand-up comedy

Construction
- Opened: 1957

Website
- https://boston.broadway.com/theatre/charles-playhouse/
- Charles Playhouse
- U.S. National Register of Historic Places
- Coordinates: 42°21′0″N 71°3′58″W
- Area: less than one acre
- Built: 1839
- Architect: Asher Benjamin
- NRHP reference No.: 80000676
- Added to NRHP: June 16, 1980

The Charles Playhouse is a theater at 74 Warrenton Street Boston in the Boston Theater District. The venue comprises an approximately 500-seat mainstage, which hosted the long-running Blue Man Group, and a 200-seat second stage branded as the comedy club Lil Chuck. The second stage previously hosted Shear Madness for 40 years, one of the longest runs in American theater history.

== History ==
In 1957, the Charles Playhouse opened at 54 Charles Street. In 1958, the company moved to the current Warrenton Street location. The Warrenton Street building was originally built in 1839, as the Fifth Universalist Church from a design by architect Asher Benjamin. In 1864, it became the second home of Congregation Ohabei Shalom, the first synagogue in Boston. It was later transformed into a speakeasy called The Lido Venice, which became the Southland ballroom and cafe- featuring prominent jazz artists such as Count Basie, Duke Ellington, Cab Calloway, Jimmie Lunceford, and many others during the Jazz Age.

In 1958, the Charles Playhouse staged a revival of O'Neill's The Iceman Cometh. The founding artistic director, Michael Murray, led the company until 1968. The founder and managing director was Frank Sugrue. The acting company included many stars-to-be such as Al Pacino, Olympia Dukakis, Jill Clayburgh, Jane Alexander, Ned Beatty, and John Cazale. The company produced Boston premieres of plays by Brecht, Beckett, Osborne, and Ionesco, as well as classics by Shakespeare, Shaw, Ibsen, Pirandello, and others.

The Charles Playhouse was regarded as one of the pioneering regional theaters in America. In his book, Regional Theatre: the Revolutionary Stage, Joseph Wesley Zeigler identifies it as one of six theatres which were the foundations of the Regional Theatre Movement.

In 1995, Sugrue sold the Charles Playhouse to Jon B. Platt, who operated the Colonial Theatre. In 1998, Platt sold his Boston theatres to SFX Entertainment (now Live Nation). In 2008, Live Nation sold most of its theatrical division, including the Charles Playhouse, to Key Brand Entertainment (now the John Gore Organization).

After its 40-year run on the second stage, Shear Madness closed in March 2020, at the start of the COVID-19 epidemic. In October 2024, the space reopened as Lil Chuck, a comedy club. The stage had previously opened as Boston's first dedicated comedy venue, the Comedy Connection, in 1978.

On July 6, 2025, after 13,030 shows over nearly 30 years, Blue Man Group played their final show at the Charles Playhouse.

== See also ==
- National Register of Historic Places listings in northern Boston, Massachusetts
