= Main Street Historic District (Greenfield, Massachusetts) =

Historic district in Massachusetts, United States

- U.S. National Register of Historic Places
- U.S. Historic district
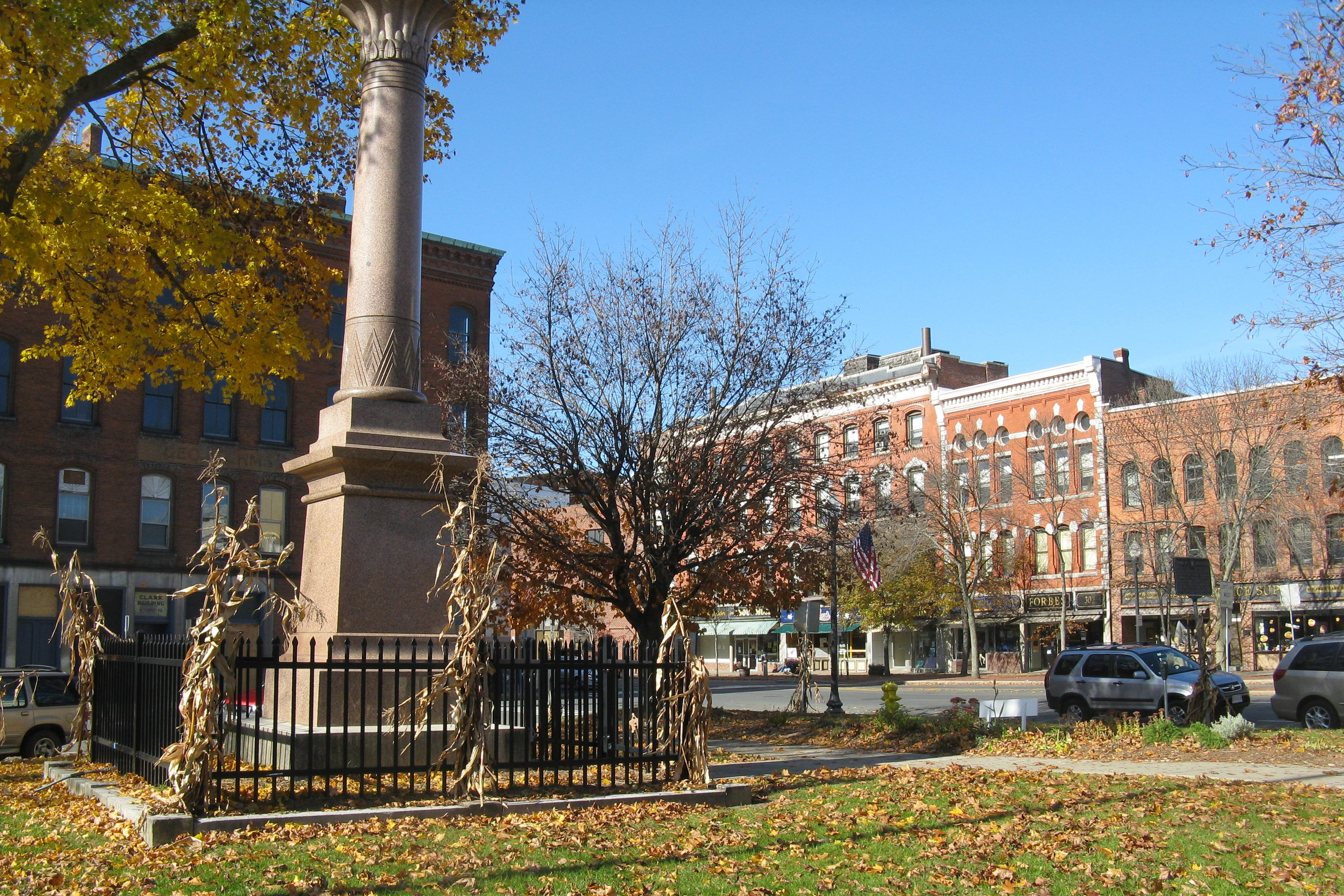
- Court Square

- Location within Massachusetts Location within the United States
- Location: Main St. and Bank Row, Greenfield, Massachusetts
- Coordinates: 42°35′13″N 72°36′5″W
- Area: 17.5 acres (7.1 ha)
- Architect: Benjamin, Asher; Et al.
- Architectural style: Mid 19th Century Revival, Late 19th And 20th Century Revivals, Late Victorian
- NRHP reference No.: 88001908
- Added to NRHP: October 13, 1988

The Main Street Historic District encompasses the civic core of Greenfield, Massachusetts, the county seat of Franklin County, Massachusetts. The district includes several blocks of Main Street extending roughly from Chapman Street in the west to Franklin Street in the east, as well as a number of properties facing the common along Bank Row, south of Main Street, and is architecture reflective of the city's 19th-century growth as a major crossroads and county seat. The district includes the town hall, county courthouse, several 19th-century bank buildings, and three properties previously listed on the National Register of Historic Places: the Garden Theater Block, the Leavitt-Hovey House (which houses the public library), and the 1915 Post Office building. The district was listed on the National Register of Historic Places in 1988.

Greenfield was settled in the 17th century as part of Deerfield, and was incorporated as a town in 1775. The town center was by then already established on Main Street, with a variety of businesses and residences, none of which have survived. Major travel routes, both north–south and east–west, where developed in the late 18th century that met there. The town became the shire town of Franklin County when it was established in 1811, and a series of civic buildings took shape thereafter in the Bank Row/Court Square area. Commercial development extended east from that area as the 19th century progressed, although a few older homes survived this process, including the Leavitt-Hovey House. Further development was spurred by the arrival of railroads in the mid-19th century, and the late 19th century was the town's period of greatest industrial and economic growth.

== See also ==
- East Main-High Street Historic District
- National Register of Historic Places listings in Franklin County, Massachusetts
