= Avery–Hunter House =

Historic house in Ohio, United States

- U.S. National Register of Historic Places
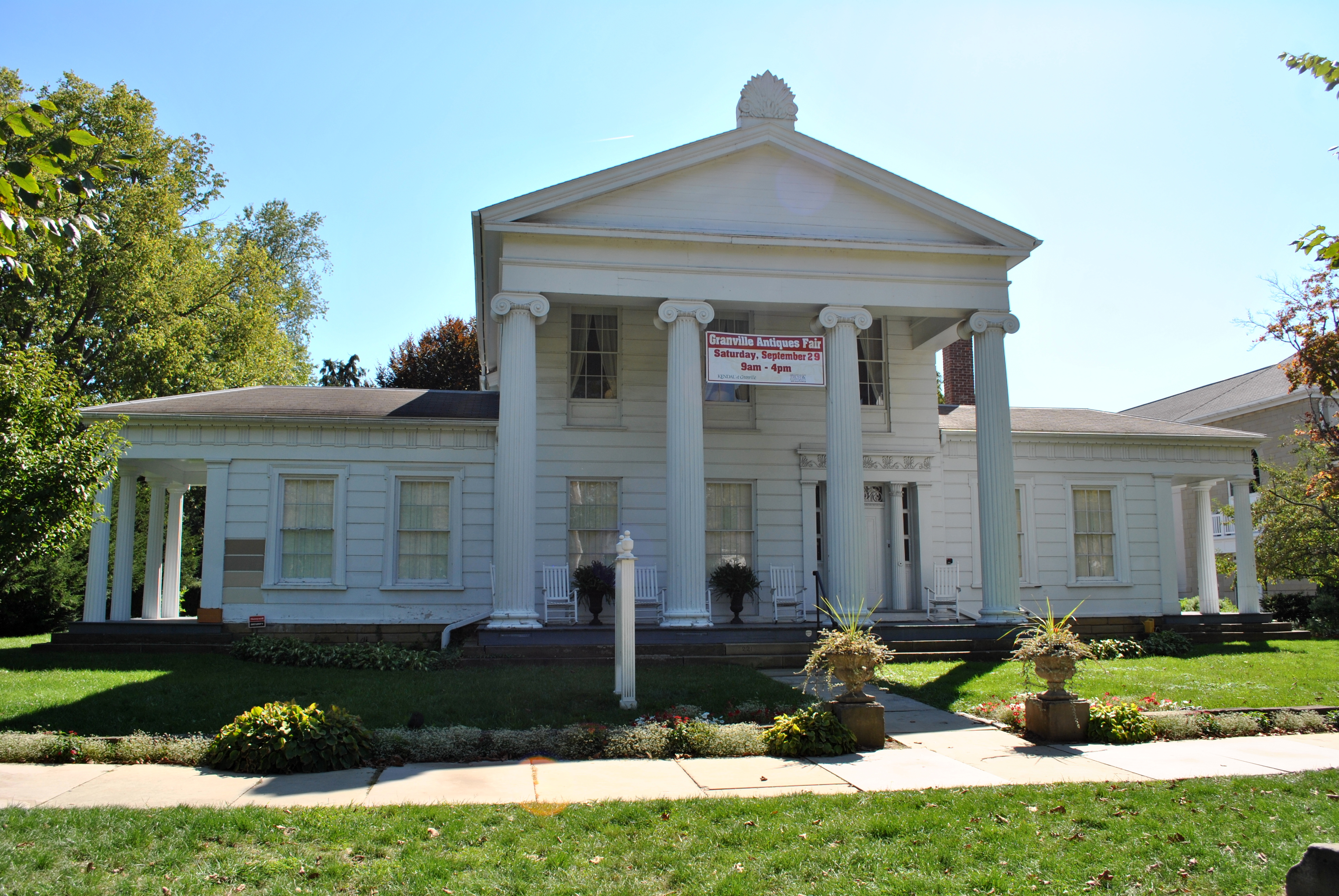

- Location within Ohio Location within the United States
- Location: 221 East Broadway, Granville, Ohio
- Coordinates: 40°4′4.11″N 82°31′4.57″W
- Built: 1842
- Architect: Benjamin Morgan
- Architectural style: Greek Revival
- NRHP reference No.: 79001877
- Added to NRHP: December 27, 1979

Avery–Hunter House is a registered historic house located at 221 East Broadway in Granville, Ohio. It was listed on the National Register on December 27, 1979.

== Historic uses ==
It was originally built for Alfred Avery in 1842 with significant additions in 1873. The original Greek Revival-style home was designed by architect Benjamin Morgan, who also designed the St. Luke's Episcopal Church in Granville, also for Avery.

The house was used as a private residence until 1902. Afterwards, the house became the chapter house of the Lambda Deuteron chapter of Phi Gamma Delta, which resided at Denison University. It continued to be used as a fraternity house until 1956 when it was purchased by Robbins Hunter Jr.

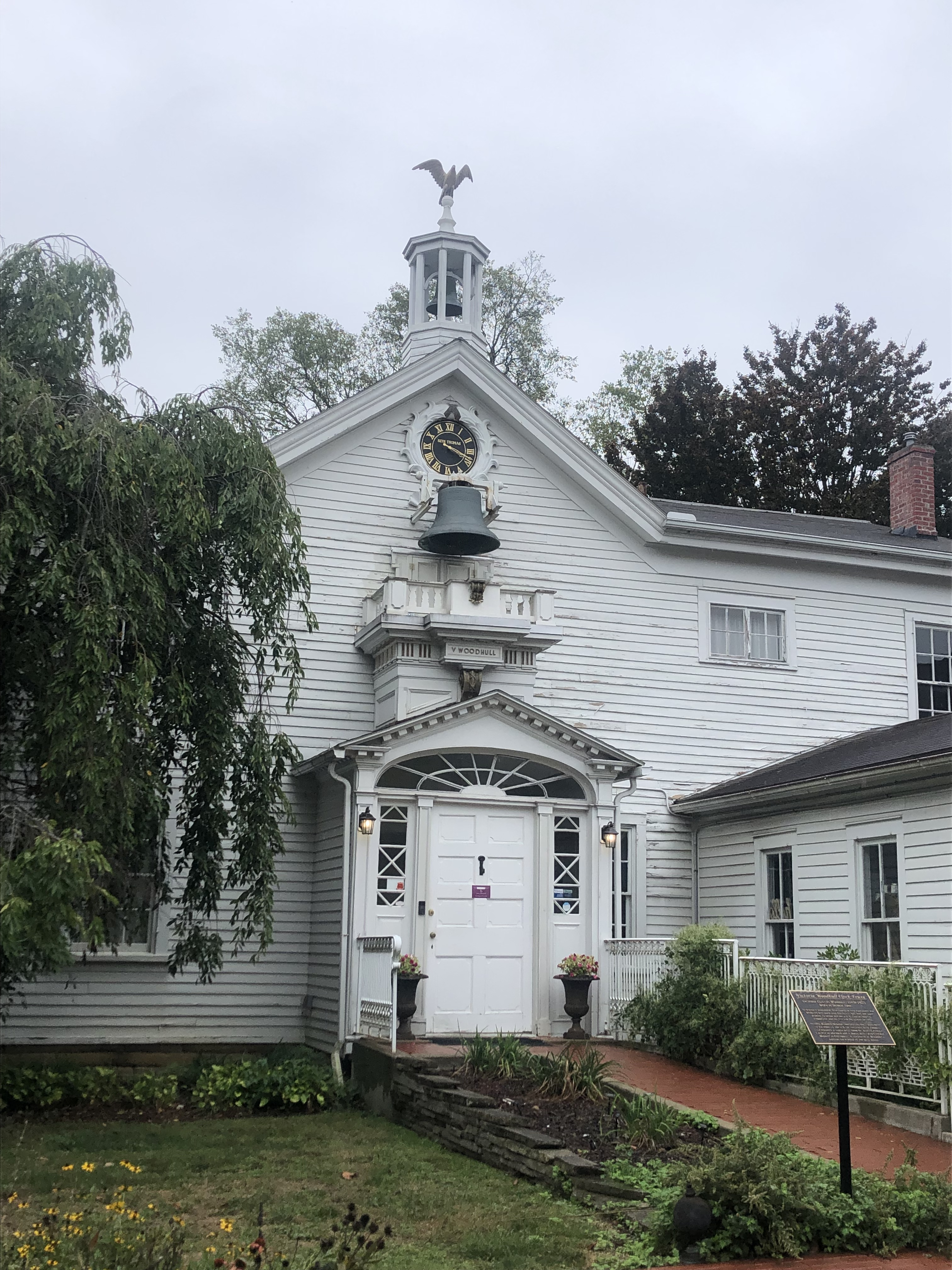
The Victoria Woodhull Clock at Robbins Hunter Museum, Granville, OH

The home is now owned by the Licking County Historical Society which operates it as the Robbins Hunter Museum.
