= Lynching of Carl Etherington =

1910 lynching in Ohio, United States

- Location: Newark, Ohio, U.S.
- Date: July 8, 1910; Approx. 10:30 p.m.
- Target: Carl Etherington
- Attack type: Lynching, mob violence
- Weapons: Hammer, rope
- Deaths: Carl Etherington)
- Perpetrator: Vigilante mob (estimated 2,500–8,000 people)

Carl Etherington, a teenager hired by the Anti-Saloon League to enforce prohibition laws in Licking County, Ohio, was lynched on the night of July 8, 1910, following raids on several saloons. Seventeen-year-old Etherington, a former Marine from Kentucky, was part of a group of special agents tasked with raiding Licking County saloons that were violating the county's ban on alcohol sales. On July 8, Etherington and his fellow agents were assigned to execute search and seizure warrants in three Newark, Ohio saloons. Altercations between agents and saloon owners and patrons followed, and a violent mob soon formed. After becoming separated from his fellow detectives, Etherington shot saloon owner and former police captain William Howard in self-defense, which led to his arrest. Later that night, the mob broke into Etherington's cell and dragged him outside, where they beat him and hanged him.

== Background ==
In 1908, twelve years prior to U.S. Prohibition, the Ohio Legislature passed the Rose County Local Option Act, which gave individual counties the power to regulate the sale of alcoholic beverages. In January 1909, Licking County residents voted to "go dry" by a margin of 708 votes. But in the county seat of Newark, voters were in favor of allowing alcohol sales by a margin of 1,557 votes. Despite the county-wide ban on alcohol sales, Newark saloons remained open and had the support and patronage of local law enforcement and politicians. According to at least one newspaper report from the time, Newark's mayor and police chief had an under-the-table deal with bar owners, who paid them $10 weekly to continue to sell alcohol.

In the face of such corruption, the Anti-Saloon League, a national organization that advocated for the prohibition of alcohol, created private police forces to enforce antiliquor laws. Carl Etherington was one of these "secret agents."

== Event ==
In July 1910, the mayor of Granville, Ohio, a village in Licking County with a strong pro-Temperance history, issued a warrant for a raid of three illicit Newark saloons. On July 8, the mayor, Dr. E.J. Barns, swore in between 19 and 23 (reports vary) Anti-Saloon League agents as officers of the law and tasked them with executing the warrants.

Upon the agents' arrival in Newark, violence ensued almost immediately, as a patron at the first saloon struck one of the agents with brass knuckles. At the next establishment, one of the agents was held captive by a mob for two hours. At the third saloon, which was owned by Lewis Bolton, the mob met the agents with "an arsenal of weapons," and the confrontation became violent. The Newark police department arrested about half of the agents, and the others fled, fearing for their lives. However, Etherton became separated from his fellow agents, and the mob pursued him for more than two miles. A former police captain and bar owner named William Howard joined the mob, which eventually caught Etherington. When Howard began beating him, Etherington shot him with a revolver and was immediately arrested.

The mob, which continued to grow, congregated around the jail where Etherington was being held. Accounts of the event report that the crowd numbered between 2,500 and 8,000 people. According to some reports, Etherington spent his last moments praying and writing to his parents before he tried to commit suicide by wrapping his head in his coat and setting fire to it, but his attempt was unsuccessful. After the crowd received news that Howard had died from his gunshot wound, the mob began trying to enter the jail. At approximately 10:30 p.m., they were able to get inside, seize Etherington, and drag him into the public square. They kicked Etherington and hit him in the head with a hammer before tying a rope around his neck and hanging him from a telegraph pole. Reports mention that Etherington's last words to the crowd were, "Tell my mother that I died trying to do my duty".

== Aftermath and impact ==
After the event, the Ohio Anti-Saloon League argued that Newark's public officials, including Mayor Herbert Atherton, were responsible for the lynching, which they suggested could have been prevented if the mayor had required more police officers to protect Etherington after his arrest. The Ohio Anti-Saloon League also argued for increased enforcement.

The lynching generally received negative press coverage due to Carl Etherington's status as a white man working to enforce the law. The Ohio governor at the time removed the mayor of Newark, and the Ohio Attorney General announced that anyone who supported the mob would be tried for complicity in the murder. After this announcement, they issued 39 indictments, and 15 individuals were charged with first-degree murder. Most of the people who were convicted received pardons four years later.

In 2017, a plaque dedicated to Etherington was erected outside the door of the Licking County Jail. Additionally, Newark Division of Police Deputy Chief Erik McKee worked to have Etherington's death recognized as a line of duty death by the Ohio Peace Officers Memorial and the Officer Down Memorial Page. The Licking County Governmental Preservation Society also designated July 8 as Carl Etherington Day.
