= First Miles =

Compilation album by Miles Davis
- Released: 1990
- Recorded: April 24, 1945 (#9–16); WOR Studios, New York City; August 14, 1947 (#1–8); Harry Smith Studios, NYC
- Genre: Jazz music, bop music
- Length: 44:50
- Label: Savoy
- Producer: Teddy Reig

Miles Davis chronology
Aura (1989)	First Miles (1990)	Dingo (1991)

Professional ratings
Review scores
Source	Rating
Allmusic	2/5 stars

First Miles is a compilation album by American jazz musician Miles Davis, released on July 12, 1990, by Savoy Records. The album includes tracks from Davis's first recording session, backing singer Rubberlegs Williams on April 24, 1945, and the first session produced under his name, leading the members of Charlie Parker's band on August 14, 1947.

Davis plays no solos in the session with Rubberlegs Williams, only being heard as part of an ensemble. He says in his autobiography he was so nervous on his first ever recording he could hardly play, and he forgot most of the details as he put the experience out of his mind.

Davis had already recorded several sessions by 1947 as a member of Parker's band for the Savoy and Dial labels, but whereas Parker usually recorded with no rehearsals, Davis had the group rehearse the material twice before recording. Davis wrote and arranged all four tracks, which were released as 78 rpm singles under the name "Miles Davis All-Stars". The four tracks have also been compiled on numerous Charlie Parker Savoy compilations, including Bird: The Savoy Recordings (Master Takes) (SJL 2201). Davis' next recording session as leader would be the first of the Birth of the Cool sessions in 1949, after having left Parker's band.

== Track listing ==
Savoy Jazz – SJL 1196
No.	Title	Writer(s)	Length
1.	"That's the Stuff You Gotta Watch" (Alternate Take 1)	Buck Ram & Noble Sissle	3:03
2.	"That's the Stuff You Gotta Watch" (Alternate Take 2)	Buck Ram & Noble Sissle	3:10
3.	"That's the Stuff You Gotta Watch" (Master Take 3)	Buck Ram & Noble Sissle	3:14
4.	"Pointless Mama Blues"	Teddy Reig & Rubberlegs Williams	2:48
5.	"Deep Sea Blues"	Teddy Reig & Rubberlegs Williams	3:13
6.	"Bring It On Home" (False Start Take 1)	Teddy Reig & Rubberlegs Williams	0:15
7.	"Bring It On Home" (Alternate Take 2)	Teddy Reig & Rubberlegs Williams	2:47
8.	"Bring It On Home" (Master Take 3)	Teddy Reig & Rubberlegs Williams	2:48
9.	"Milestones" (False Start Take 1)	Miles Davis	0:09
10.	"Milestones" (Master Take 2)	Miles Davis	2:36
11.	"Milestones" (Alternate Take 3)	Miles Davis	2:45
12.	"Little Willie Leaps" (False Start – Incomplete Take 1)	Miles Davis	0:51
13.	"Little Willie Leaps" (Alternate Take 2)	Miles Davis	3:09
14.	"Little Willie Leaps" (Master Take 3)	Miles Davis	2:50
15.	"Half Nelson" (Alternate Take 1)	Miles Davis	2:50
16.	"Half Nelson" (Master Take 2)	Miles Davis	2:44
17.	"Sippin' at Bells" (False Start – Incomplete Take 1)	Miles Davis	0:55
18.	"Sippin' at Bells" (Master Take 1)	Miles Davis	2:23
19.	"Sippin' at Bells" (False Start – Take 3)	Miles Davis	0:06
20.	"Sippin' at Bells" (Alternate Take 4)	Miles Davis	2:26

- Subsequent reissues often combined false start takes and reordered the Davis tracks first. A 2003 reissue CD contained bonus track "Now's The Time"

CD Reissue (Savoy – SVY 17169)
No.	Title	Writer(s)	Length
16.	"Now's the Time" (Master Take 4)	Charlie Parker	3:15

== Original 78 rpm singles ==
The master takes of the tracks on this album were originally issued on the following 78 rpm singles:

- Savoy 564: Rubberlegs Williams – That's the Stuff You Gotta Watch / Pointless Mama Blues
- Savoy 5516: Rubberlegs Williams – Deep Sea Blues / Bring It On Home
- Savoy 934: Miles Davis All-Stars – Milestones / Sippin' at Bells
- Savoy 951: Fats Navarro & Leo Parker – Goin' to Minton's / Miles Davis & Charlie Parker – Half Nelson
- Savoy 977: Charlie Parker – Chasin' the Bird / Miles Davis All-Stars – Little Willie Leaps

== Personnel ==
=== Milestones / Little Willie Leaps / Half Nelson / Sippin' at Bells ===
Miles Davis All-Stars, August 14, 1947, Harry Smith Studios, NYC

- Miles Davis – trumpet
- Charlie Parker – tenor sax
- John Lewis – piano
- Nelson Boyd – bass
- Max Roach – drums

=== That's the Stuff You Gotta Watch / Pointless Mama Blues / Deep Sea Blues / Bring It On Home ===
Herbie Fields Band with Rubberlegs Williams, April 24, 1945, WOR Studios, NYC

- Rubberlegs Williams – vocals
- Miles Davis – trumpet
- Herbie Fields – tenor sax, clarinet
- Teddy Brannon – piano
- Leonard Gaskin – bass
- Ed Nicholson – drums

=== Production ===
- Teddy Reig – original producer
- Phil Schaap – compilation producer, remastering assistant, liner notes
- Jack Towers and Joe Brescio – remastering
- Dick Smith – art director
- William Gottlieb – cover photograph
