= Lottie Estelle Granger =

American educator and school officer

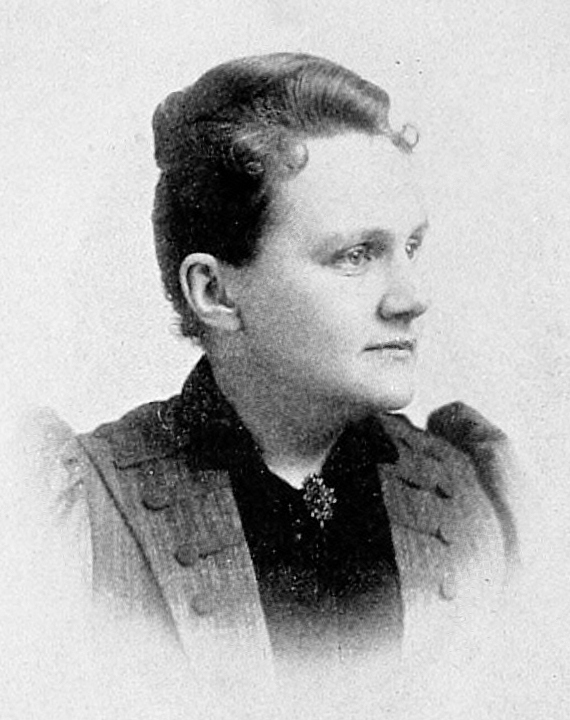
Lottie Estelle Granger

Lottie Estelle Granger (28 January 1858 – 9 May 1934) was an American educator and school officer from the U.S. state of Ohio. She served as county superintendent of public schools of Page County, Iowa, and was the second woman elected president of the Iowa State Teachers' Association.

== Early years and education ==
Lottie Estelle Granger born near Granville, Ohio, 28 January 1858. Her father, Sylvester Granger, was of New England descent, and her mother, Elizabeth Walrath, of German origin. Granger was the seventh child in a family of eight children. While she was yet a baby, her father removed to a town in a remote part of the county of her birth, where he engaged in the hotel business. At the age of four, she started school. At the age of seven, the family removed to the countryside. She regularly attended the district school, making rapid progress, never second in any of her classes. Through the cooperation of the president of Shepardson College, then Young Ladies' Institute (now Denison University), she was enabled to complete a classical course of study, graduating in 1880.

== Career ==
When she had rounded her 16th birthday, she decided to try teaching. With a recommendation from her teacher, she appeared before the county board of examiners at Newark, Ohio for examination, and secured a certificate. Soon after, she was teaching her first school in the vicinity of her early childhood, near Johnstown, Ohio. For US$1 per day, she taught this school of 75 pupils for a term of three months, and after paying her board, had $42 left from the proceeds, the first money she ever earned for herself. The following winter, she spent at home and attended the district school, and for the two successive summers, taught a term of three months.

On completing her work at Granville, she landed in Kansas, where near the town of Shawnee, in “Little Blue School,” she taught for six months during the fall and winter of 1880–1. In the spring of 1881, Granger came to Iowa, and in the following September, began work as a teacher in the public schools of Shenandoah Page county. Here she remained about five years, resigning her position on 1 January 1886, to assume the official duties of County Superintendent, to which she had been nominated and elected the fall previous. In 1887, Granger was re-elected for a second term. She held the position for six years.

At the annual meeting of the Iowa State Teachers' Association, held in Des Moines in 1888, she was unanimously elected president, being the second woman -Phebe Sudlow being the first- ever chosen to fill that honorable place during the 35 years of the organization. She was also a member of the Educational Council, the senate of the teachers' association. From its organization, she served on the board of managers of the Iowa State Teachers' Reading Circle.

Granger was an active Sunday-school and temperance movement worker. She was a Chautauqua graduate, as well as an able speaker and writer. Declining a fourth term of service as county superintendent, Granger, pursued a post-graduate course of study at Chicago University. After election to office, her home was in Clarinda, Iowa. Granger died at the age of 76 and is interred in Granville.
