= United States Post Office–Greenfield Main =

- US Post Office-Greenfield Main
- U.S. National Register of Historic Places
- U.S. Historic district – Contributing property
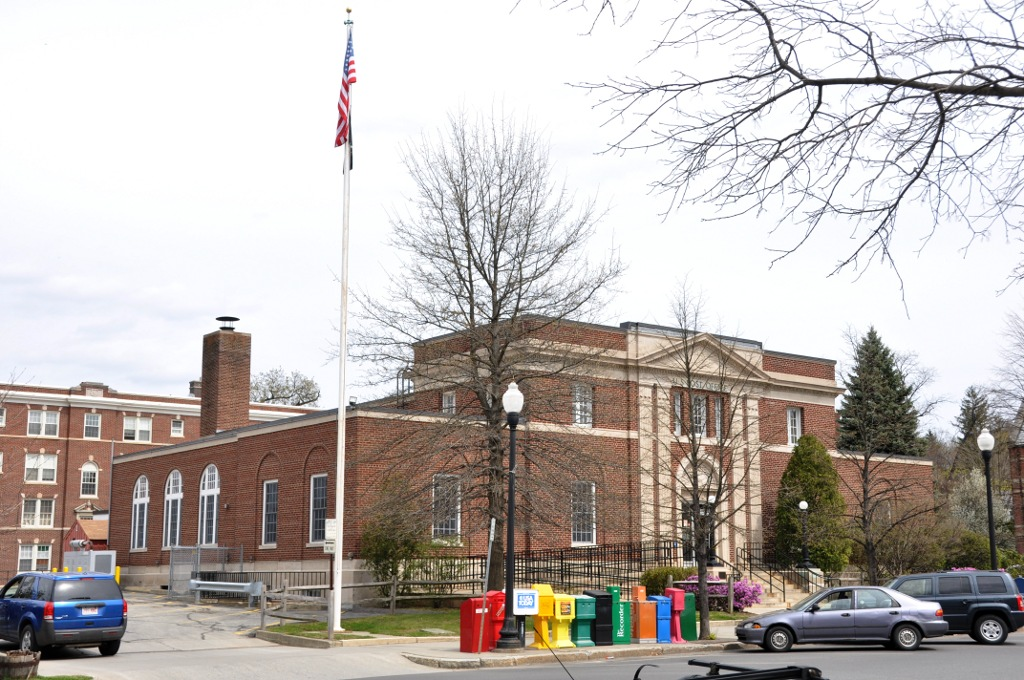

- Location within Massachusetts Location within the United States
- Location: 442 Main St., Greenfield, Massachusetts
- Coordinates: 42°35′15″N 72°35′53″W
- Area: less than one acre
- Built: 1915; 1939
- Architect: Wenderoth, Oscar; Simon, Louis A.
- Architectural style: Classical Revival, Beaux Arts
- Part of: Main Street Historic District (ID88001908)
- NRHP reference No.: 85003224

Significant dates
- Added to NRHP: December 20, 1985
- Designated CP: October 13, 1988

The US Post Office-Greenfield Main is a historic post office at 442 Main Street in Greenfield, Massachusetts. Built in 1915 and enlarged in 1939, it is a good example of a post office with Beaux Arts and Classical Revival features. It was listed on the National Register of Historic Places in 1985, and included in the Main Street Historic District in 1988.

== Description and history ==
Greenfield's main post office occupies a prominent location in downtown Greenfield, on the north side of Main Street opposite the Franklin County Courthouse. It consists of a two-story main block, with virtually identical single-story wings extending to either side. Broad steps, flanked on either side by original light fixtures on iron stands, lead to the main entrance. It features restrained Colonial Revival decorations, including a two-story pilastered pediment surrounding a recessed arched entrance with ornate features. Windows are tall sash, set in slightly recessed arched blinds. The interior lobby spaces has terrazzo marble floors, granite wainscoting, and stained woodwork. A bronze sculpture stands in the lobby; it was placed in 1941, and is the work of Hélène Sardeau.

The central two-story portion of the building was built in 1915 to a design by Oscar Wenderoth, then the head of the Office of the Supervising Architect at the United States Treasury Department. The building was expanded in 1939, adding single story wings on each side. It is one of the city's most architecturally sophisticated buildings.

== See also ==
- National Register of Historic Places listings in Franklin County, Massachusetts
- List of United States post offices
