= Jacob Little (pastor) =

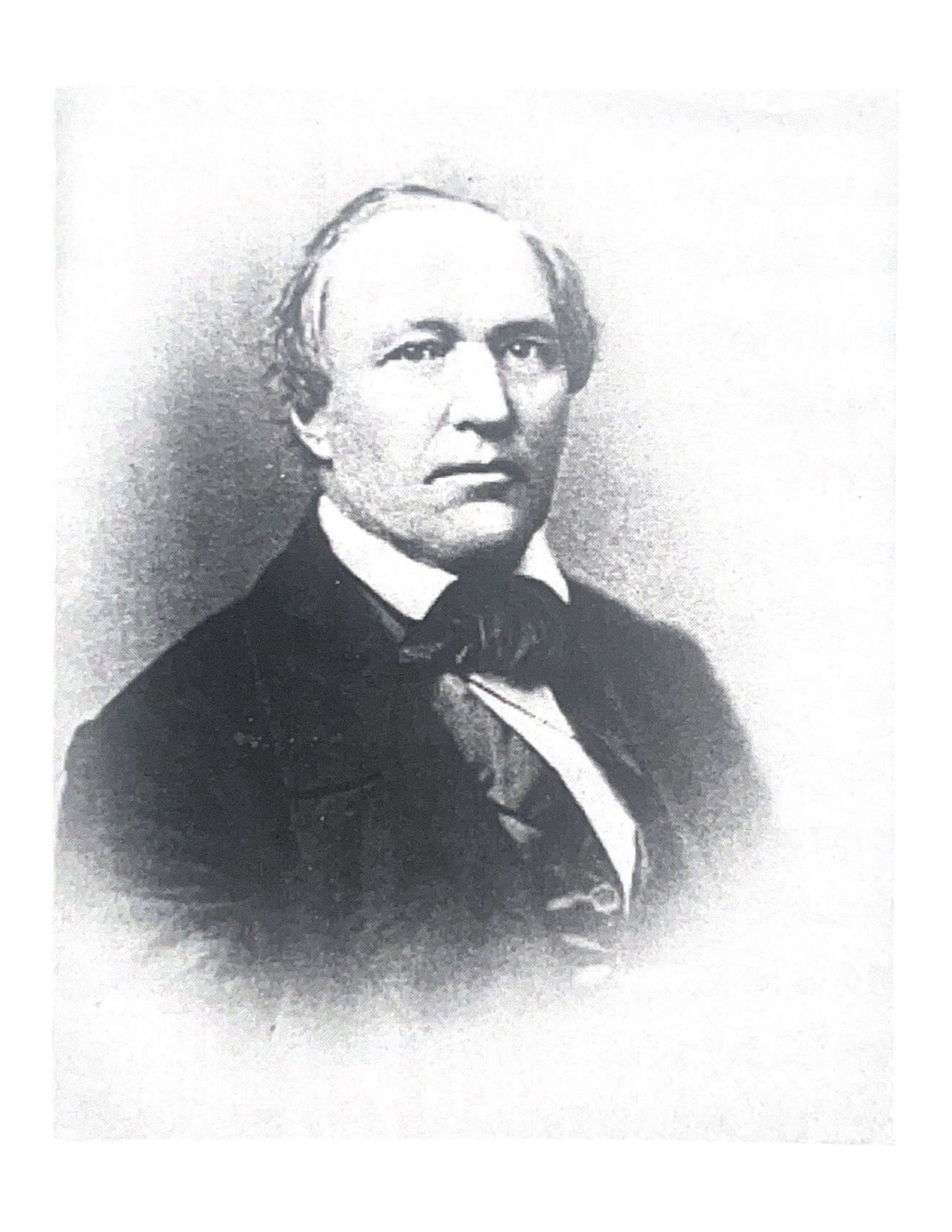
- Church: Congregational

Personal details
- Born: May 1, 1795 West Boscawen, New Hampshire, U.S.
- Died: December 17, 1876 (aged 81)

Jacob Little (May 1, 1795 – December 17, 1876) was an American Congregational minister known for his long tenure as pastor in Granville, Ohio. His career was marked by regular revivals, community-building efforts, and a steadfast dedication to his congregation. He was also recognized for his contributions to the temperance movement and his involvement in pastoral education later in life. After his time as a preacher, he was an important figure in the early history of Denison University.

== Early life and education ==
Little was born on May 1, 1795, in West Boscawen (New Webster), New Hampshire, to Jesse and Martha Gerrish Little, devout Christians and active members of the local Congregational church. Raised in a farming family, Little's early years were shaped by rural New England's agrarian lifestyle. He frequently worked long hours on his family's land, often staying overnight on a remote property to maximize his time. Jacob had a sister, Emma Little, who often worked with him. Historical accounts describe him as being "born from above"—that is, adopting Christian faith—in 1806 at age ten.

At the age of 20, on June 25, 1815, he formally joined the Congregational Church. Little began his education under the guidance of his pastor, Dr. Samuel Wood, D.D., before attending Meriden Academy, a private boarding school in New Hampshire. He graduated in 1818, and he later entered Dartmouth College, from which he graduated on August 21, 1822. He continued his theological studies at Andover Theological Seminary, where he wrote a dissertation on the religion of the Grand Lama, earning a Bachelor of Divinity degree.

== Personal life ==
=== Marriage and children ===
In 1826, Little married Lucy Gerrish, the daughter of Capt. Joseph Gerrish. She bore three children with him before her death from typhoid fever on October 5, 1834. The youngest of their three children also died that year from the same illness. Two years later, on March 23, 1836, he married Ann D. Thompson, daughter of Thomas M. Thompson, one of his parishioners. Their marriage was notably conducted at a Wednesday conference on "Domestic Relations," catching the congregation by surprise. They had seven children together.

Three of Rev. Jacob Little's sons became ministers. Joseph Little studied at Western Reserve College and Lane Seminary and later served as an army chaplain, where he had a distinguished service record. He was developing a series of charts for his ministry in West Virginia when health issues required him to recuperate at the Health Retreat in Dansville, New York. He married Emma K. Little, originally from Granville. George Little, another of Jacob Little's sons, attended Marietta College and Lane Seminary. He served as a minister first in Oconto, Wisconsin, and later in Plymouth, Indiana.

=== Characteristics ===
Jacob Little was known for his relentless work ethic and disciplined routine. He balanced his pastoral duties with manual labor, often involving his sons in farm work. His intellectual approach to theology was methodical and evidence-based, with a mindset aligned further with Aristotelian principles than Platonic ideals.

Little was deeply pious, dedicating his life to prayer and the service of God. His public prayers were brief but comprehensive, reflecting his systematic approach to life and ministry. As a result, he was recognized for his ability to organize and mobilize others, fostering lay talent within his congregation.

Little was often described as "ambitious" and "energetic" by those who witnessed his teachings. His main focus was on improvement, and believed that with a consistent willingness to learn, improvements could always be made.

== Religious teaching ==
Jacob Little was ordained as an Evangelist in Goffstown, New Hampshire, before moving to Hoosick, New York, where his preaching led to the conversion of approximately 80 individuals through his Bible classes. In 1826, shortly after marrying his first wife Lucy, he moved to Belpre, Ohio, in Washington County.

Later that year, missionary William Slocomb recommended Little to the Granville Church in Ohio. Despite a sparse congregation at his first sermon, his personal visits to local families impressed the community. On June 1, 1827, he accepted the formal call to serve as their pastor. His work to unite the congregation, particularly through visiting disaffected members, helped to strengthen the church. Eventually, he was formally installed as pastor on September 11, 1828.

During his 37-year pastorate, Little was known for his regular revivals, occurring approximately every three years, which brought 664 individuals into the church. His commitment to visit each member of his congregation annually, despite the parish's large size, was a hallmark of his ministry. At its peak, the church had around 400 members and his lengthy New Year's Day sermons frequently drew stood-up crowds.

Rev. Jacob Little was a significant early influencer on Granville, Ohio, shaping the village's moral character and recording its historical narrative.

=== Teaching and preaching style ===
Little's sermons were noted for their variety. His morning sermons were carefully written, often on doctrinal matters, while his afternoon sermons were more extemporaneous. His Bible classes, held on alternate Sabbath evenings, were especially popular, drawing attendees from several miles away.

Additionally, Little was a passionate advocate for temperance, incorporating the subject into his sermons upon his arrival in Granville. His efforts contributed to the formation of the first temperance organization in the area in 1828 when the movement was still nascent on the western frontier.

Little was also a firm believer in practicing what he preached, sometimes to an extreme degree. In 1828, he completely swore off all alcoholic beverages in order to serve as an example of morality for his congregation. He would later take this several steps further, swearing off tobacco, coffee, and even tea. During his New Year's Day sermons, Little would read aloud the names of those he deemed "sinners"—including drinkers and dancers—a practice intended to encourage public accountability among residents.

== Later life ==
In 1855, Marietta College recognized Jacob Little's contributions by awarding him an honorary Doctor of Divinity degree. His writings, including a series on the pastoral office, were well-received, and he lectured on pastoral theology at Lane Seminary in 1863. Little resigned from his career on December 4, 1864, and moved to Indiana, where he lived a quieter life. In his later years, he continued to preach intermittently, even serving as a supply pastor at the age of 74. Little died on December 17, 1876, in Wabash, Indiana, at the age of 81.

== Legacy ==
Little's influence extended to education, inspiring the formation of the Congregational Male Academy in 1833. This institution later became the Granville Academy, which was established in 1827 and included an all-girls section known as the Granville Female Academy. Jacob and his wife played significant roles in advancing female education, teaching young women and laying an early foundation for women's learning in the area. Among the school's students was Miss Mary Ann Howe, who later opened her own school for young ladies. Emma Little, Jacob's sister, also ran a school for young women in the area for a few years.

Little, along with Dr. W. W. Bancroft, informally assumed a trustee role at Granville Academy, overseeing the hiring of teachers and ensuring the school's continuity. Mrs. Jacob Little contributed by teaching vocal music at the academy, training singers for the choir.

Little further lent his assistance to a group of Baptists to found the Granville Literary and Theological Institution, which would eventually become Denison University. Several colleges sought out his membership on their boards of trustees: he served several times each at the Western Reserve College and Central College and for a quarter century at Marietta College.
