= Asher Benjamin =

American architect

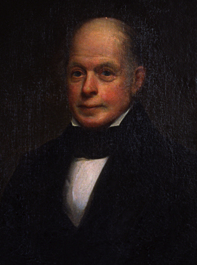
- Born: June 15, 1773; Hartland, Connecticut, British America
- Died: July 26, 1845 (aged 72); Springfield, Massachusetts, U.S.
- Occupation: Architect
- Buildings: Leavitt-Hovey House; Charles Street Meeting House; Old West Church, Boston; African Meeting House; Headquarters House; Charles Playhouse
- Projects: Wrote seven pattern books to help elevate American architectural taste

Asher Benjamin (June 15, 1773 – July 26, 1845) was an American architect and author whose work transitioned between Federal architecture and the later Greek Revival architecture. His seven handbooks on design deeply influenced the look of cities and towns throughout New England until the Civil War. Builders also copied his plans in the Midwest and in the South.

== Life and work ==
Asher Benjamin was born in rural Hartland, Connecticut, shortly before the death of his father. He resided until the age of 30 in the Connecticut River Valley, where he received his first training from a local builder. Benjamin exhibited an aptitude for architecture by carving Ionic capitals for the 1794 modifications to the Oliver Phelps House at Suffield, Connecticut. In 1795-1796 he designed and built a stone spiral staircase in the Old State House at Hartford, which had been designed by Charles Bulfinch. The latter's use of overall symmetry, blind arches, fanlights and smooth brick greatly influenced Benjamin, who popularized the urbane Federal style in countryside estates. Gideon Granger wrote of Benjamin:

"From a poor boy unaided by friends, by his indefatigable industry and talents in a few years he has raised himself to the first rank of his profession."

Upon leaving Connecticut, Benjamin settled in Greenfield, Massachusetts. There he built two large houses, including the Leavitt House (today's Leavitt-Hovey House) for Judge Jonathan Leavitt, and published his first handbook, The Country Builder's Assistant (1797). On November 30, 1797, he married Achsah Hitchcock of Brookfield, with whom he had four children. Benjamin relocated to Windsor, Vermont, where he built three large houses and the Old South Congregational Church (1798).

By 1803, Benjamin was living in Boston, listed in the city directory as a housewright. He designed numerous churches and houses, and also appears to have conducted the country's first architecture school. Robert Henry Eddy, Elias Carter, Solomon Willard, Samuel Shepherd and Ithiel Town are credited among his pupils. After his first wife died on January 30, 1805, on July 24 he married Nancy Bryant of Springfield, whom he had four more children with.

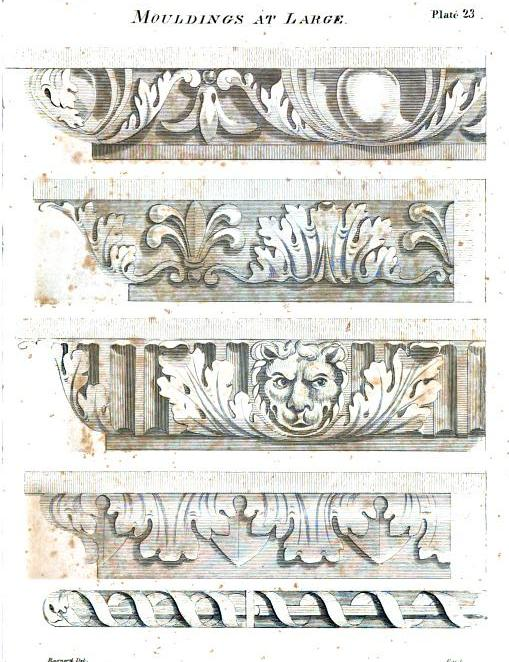
"Mouldings at large," from The American Builder's Companion, 1816

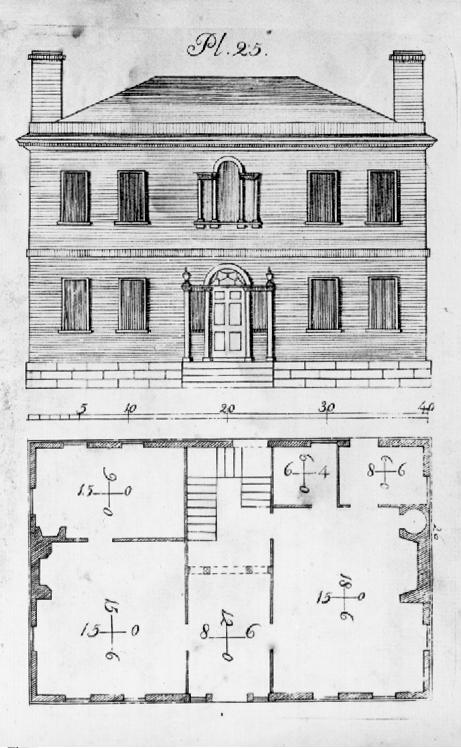
Federal style house, from The Country Builder's Assistant, 1797

In 1823 and 1824, Benjamin was elected alderman of Boston as part of the "Middling Interest": a coalition of middle class entrepreneurs and artisans opposed to the Federalists, who supported Josiah Quincy for mayor. He assisted Mayor Quincy and Alexander Parris in the planning of Quincy Market. Finding himself under a financial strain that led him to declare bankruptcy in 1825, Benjamin's political ambitions were soon curtailed. From 1825 to 1827 he left Boston to supervise construction of locks, canals, roads and mill buildings for the Nashua Manufacturing Company in Nashua, New Hampshire. He designed two churches there before returning to Boston.

Benjamin's greatest influence is derived from his pattern books. The first written by an American architect, they introduced architectural history, style and geometry to ordinary builders in the field. He adapted many designs by James Gibbs and Colen Campbell of Great Britain to fit the scale and finances of New England communities. These handbooks provided superb drawings and practical advice for full house plans, including such details as circular staircases, doorways, fireplace mantels, dormer windows, pilasters, balusters and fences. He sketched proposals for dwellings and churches, even a courthouse. The archeological sources of his designs were scrupulously cited, from the Temple of Hephaestus in Athens to the Arch of Titus in Rome. Other architects, including Ithiel Town and Ammi B. Young, freely assimilated his plans, as did innumerable carpenters. Indeed, the charm of many early New England towns owes a debt to Asher Benjamin. The Ridge in Orford, New Hampshire features a series of houses based on designs from his books, many of which remain in print. Although he helped disseminate the Federal style, he was not averse to changing fashions. In fact, his book published in 1830, The Architect, or, Practical House Carpenter, helped redirect American taste towards the Greek Revival movement.

Architectural historian Talbot Hamlin writes:

"...he, more than any other person, is responsible for the character we roughly call 'Late Colonial'; his moldings, his doors and windows and his mantels and cornices decorate or at least inspire the decorations of numberless houses up and down the New England coast and in the New England river valleys."

Asher Benjamin died in Springfield the age of 72.

== Books ==
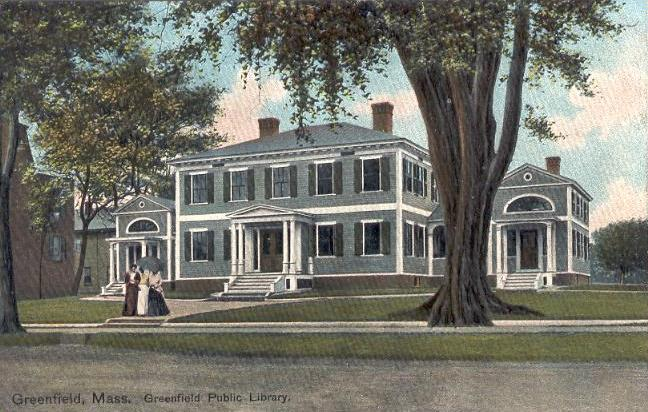
Leavitt-Hovey House, 1797, now the Greenfield Public Library

- The Country Builder's Assistant, 1797
- The American Builder's Companion, with Daniel Raynerd, 1806. 3rd ed., 1816.
- The Rudiments of Architecture, 1814
- The Architect, or, Practical House Carpenter, 1830
- The Practice of Architecture, 1833
- The Builder's Guide, 1838
- The Elements of Architecture, 1843

== Designs ==
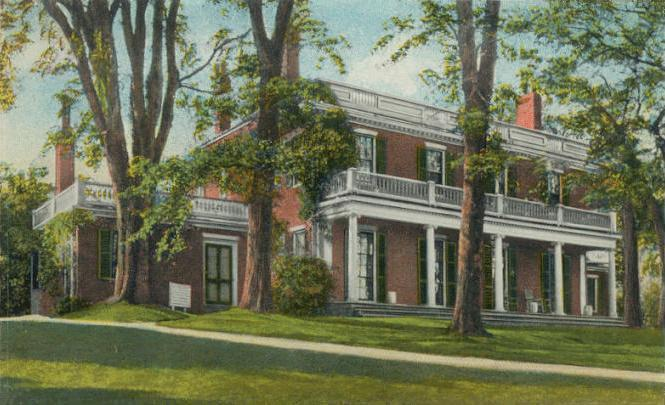
The Black House, 1824-1827, Ellsworth, Maine

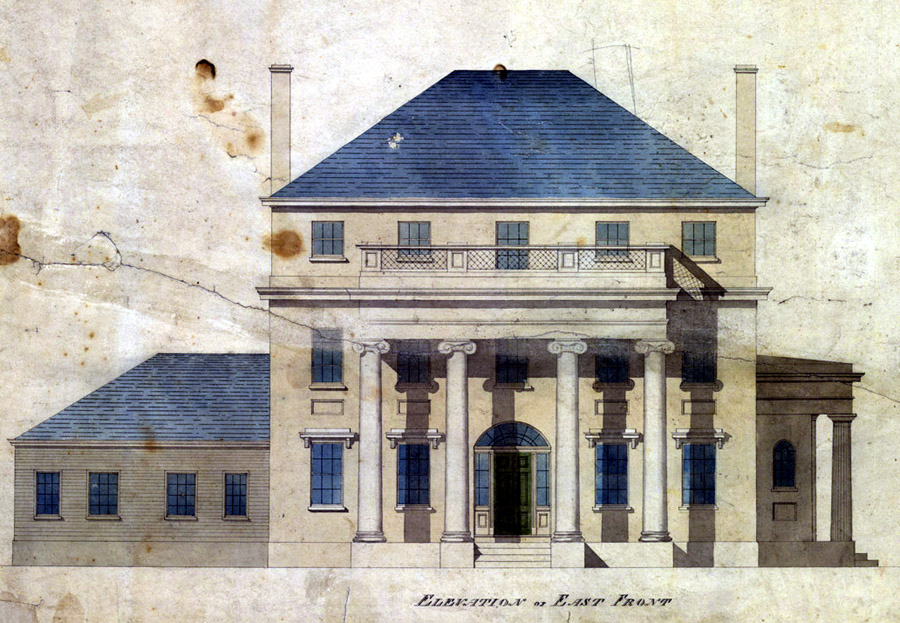
Asa Waters House, 1826, Millbury, Massachusetts

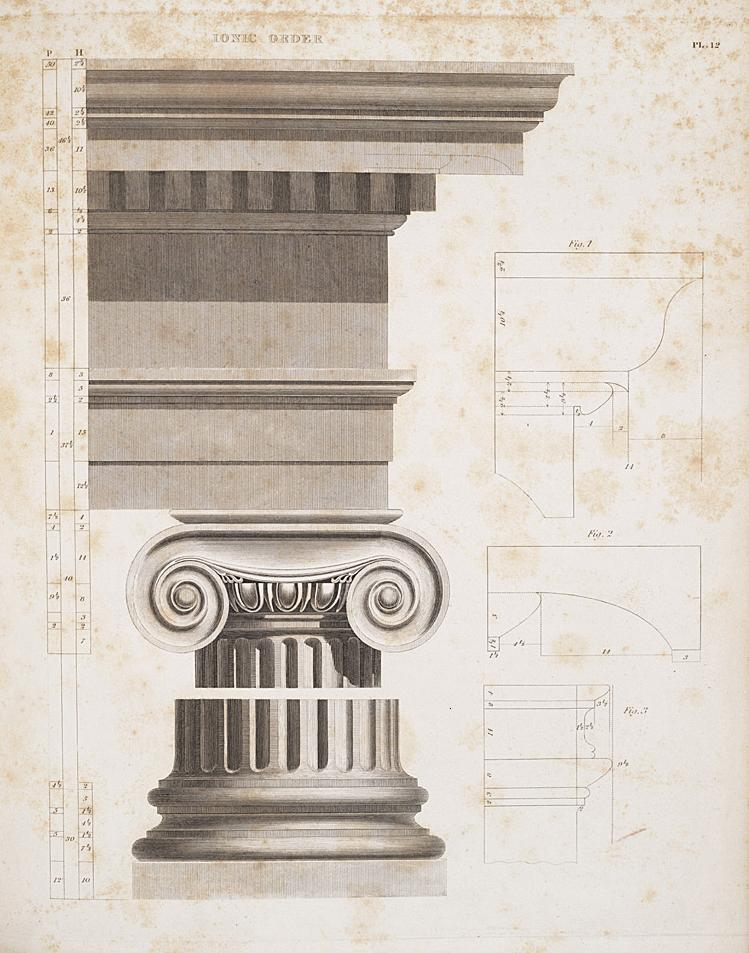
Ionic order, from The Architect, or, Practical House Carpenter 1830

- 1796—Luke Baldwin House, Brookfield, Massachusetts (demolished)
- 1796—Samuel Hinckley House, Northampton, Massachusetts (demolished)
- 1796-1797—Coleman-Hollister House, Greenfield, Massachusetts
- 1797 -- Leavitt-Hovey House (now Greenfield Public Library), Greenfield, Massachusetts
- 1797-1798—First Deerfield Academy Building (now Memorial Hall), Deerfield, Massachusetts
- 1798-1799—Stebbins House, Deerfield, Massachusetts
- 1798—Old South Congregational Church, Windsor, Vermont
- 1800—Fullerton House, Windsor, Vermont (demolished)
- 1802—Harriet Lane House, Windsor, Vermont (demolished)
- 1803—Hubbard House, Windsor, Vermont (demolished)
- 1804 -- Charles Street Meeting House, 70 Charles Street, Boston, Massachusetts
- 1805--Church on the Hill, Lenox, Massachusetts
- 1806 -- Old West Church, 131 Cambridge Street, Boston, Massachusetts
- 1806 -- African Meeting House, 8 Smith Court, Boston, Massachusetts
- 1807 -- Sumner Mansion, Hartland, Vermont
- 1808 -- Headquarters House, 54-55 Beacon Street, Boston, Massachusetts
- 1808—60 or 61 Beacon Street, Boston, Massachusetts
- 1808—Fourth Meeting House of the First Church, Chauncy Street, Boston, Massachusetts
- 1809—First Parish Church, Ashby, Massachusetts
- 1809 -- Exchange Coffee House, Boston
- 1811—Alexander House, Springfield, Massachusetts
- 1811-1812—Fourth Meeting House, Northampton, Massachusetts (demolished)
- 1812-1814—Center Church, New Haven, Connecticut (with Ithiel Town)
- 1817—Rhode Island Union Bank, Newport, Rhode Island (demolished)
- 1818—Bulfinch Hall (originally called Brick Academy), Phillips Academy, Andover, Massachusetts
- 1819—Boylston Villa, Princeton, Massachusetts (For Ward Nicholas Boylston)
- 1820—Ransom Stiles House, Argyle, New York
- 1824-1827—The Black House, Ellsworth, Maine
- 1825—Unitarian Church, Peterborough, New Hampshire
- 1826-1832 -- Asa Waters Mansion, Millbury, Massachusetts
- 1827—Unitarian Church, Canal Street, Nashua, New Hampshire
- 1827—Olive Street Church, Nashua, New Hampshire (demolished)
- 1828—70-75 Beacon Street, Boston, Massachusetts
- 1830—Isaac Munson House, South Wallingford, Vermont (demolished)
- 1832—Cambridgeport Town Hall, Cambridgeport, Massachusetts (demolished)
- 1833—Asher Benjamin House, 9 West Cedar Street, Boston, Massachusetts
- 1833—7 West Cedar Street, Boston, Massachusetts
- 1833 - Ellen Stone Building, 735 Massachusetts Ave., Lexington Massachusetts
- 1834 -- Thatcher Magoun Mansion, Medford, Massachusetts (demolished)
- 1835—Lexington-Concord Battle Monument, Peabody, Massachusetts
- 1836—Dr. George Shattuck Monument, Mount Auburn Cemetery, Massachusetts
- 1836—William Ellery Channing House, 83 Mount Vernon Street, Boston, Massachusetts
- 1836 -- Forest Home, the F. O. J. Smith House, Westbrook, Maine (demolished)
- 1837—Proposal for the Custom House, Boston, Massachusetts (competition lost to Ammi B. Young)
- 1838-1839—Fifth Universalist Church (now the Charles Playhouse), 74 Warrenton Street, Boston, Massachusetts
- 1840—Richmond Street Church, Dorchester, Massachusetts (demolished)
- 1841—Edmund Hastings House, Medford, Massachusetts (demolished)

== Gallery of designs ==
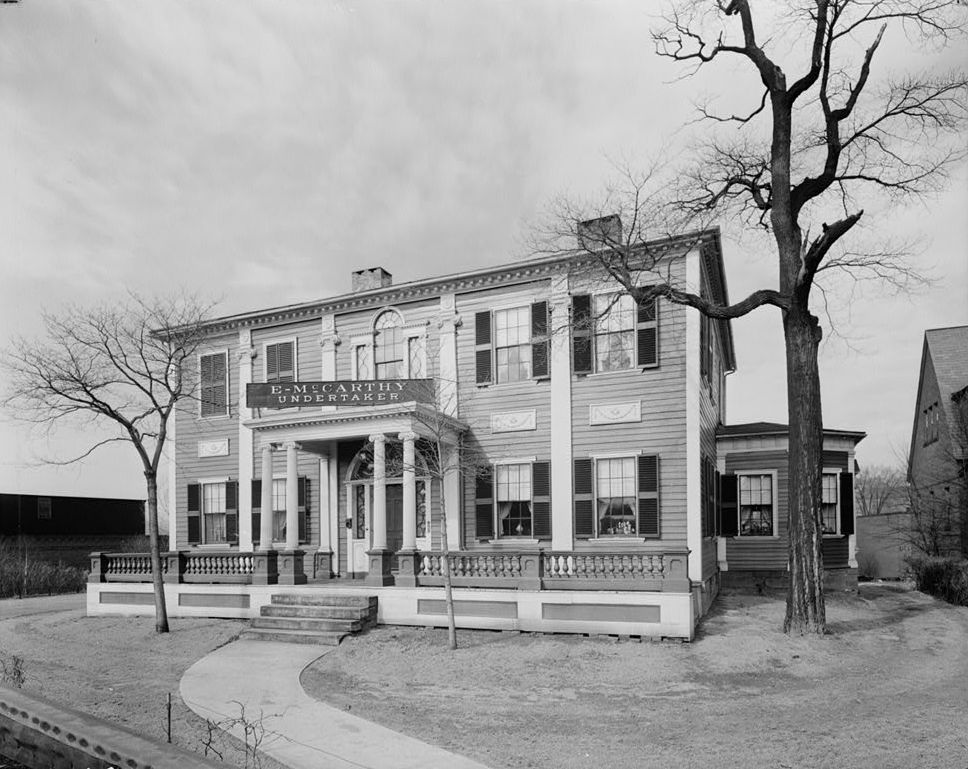
Coleman-Hollister House, 1796, Greenfield, Massachusetts

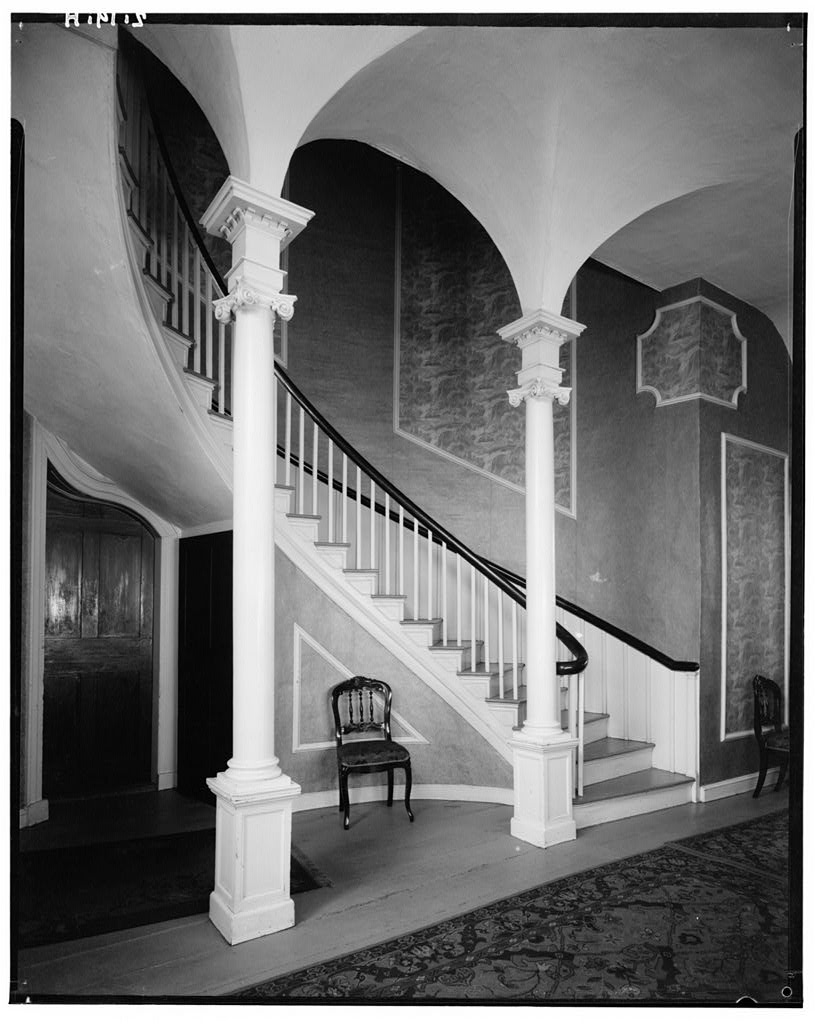
Interior, Coleman-Hollister House, 1796, Greenfield, Massachusetts

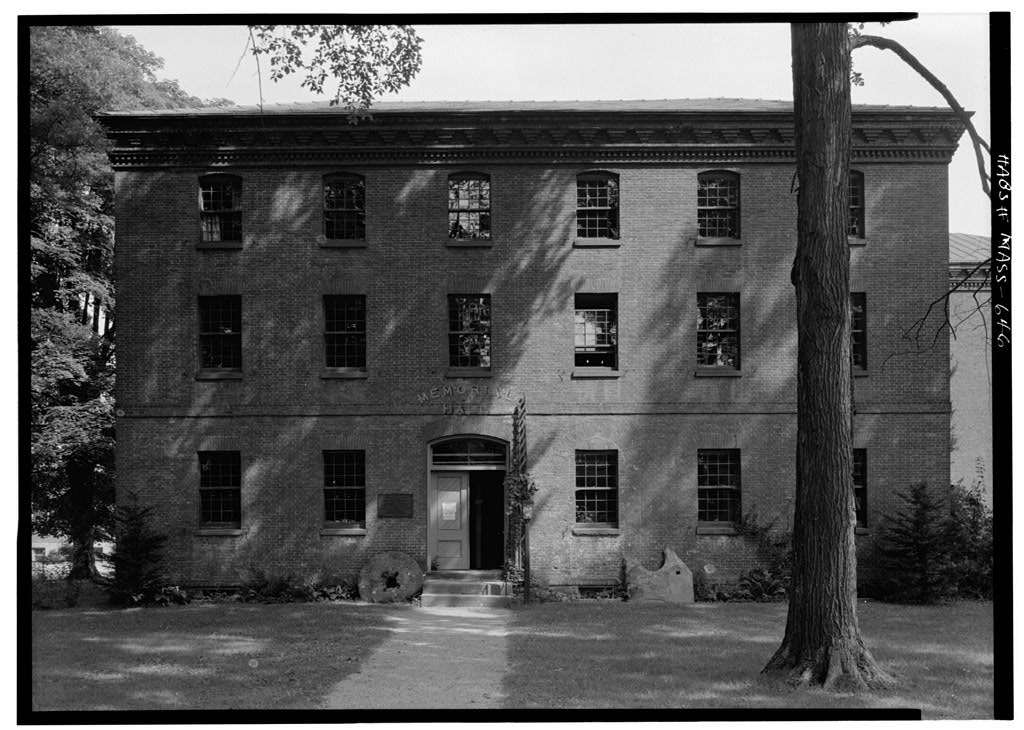
First Deerfield Academy building, later Memorial Hall, 1797–1798, Deerfield, Massachusetts

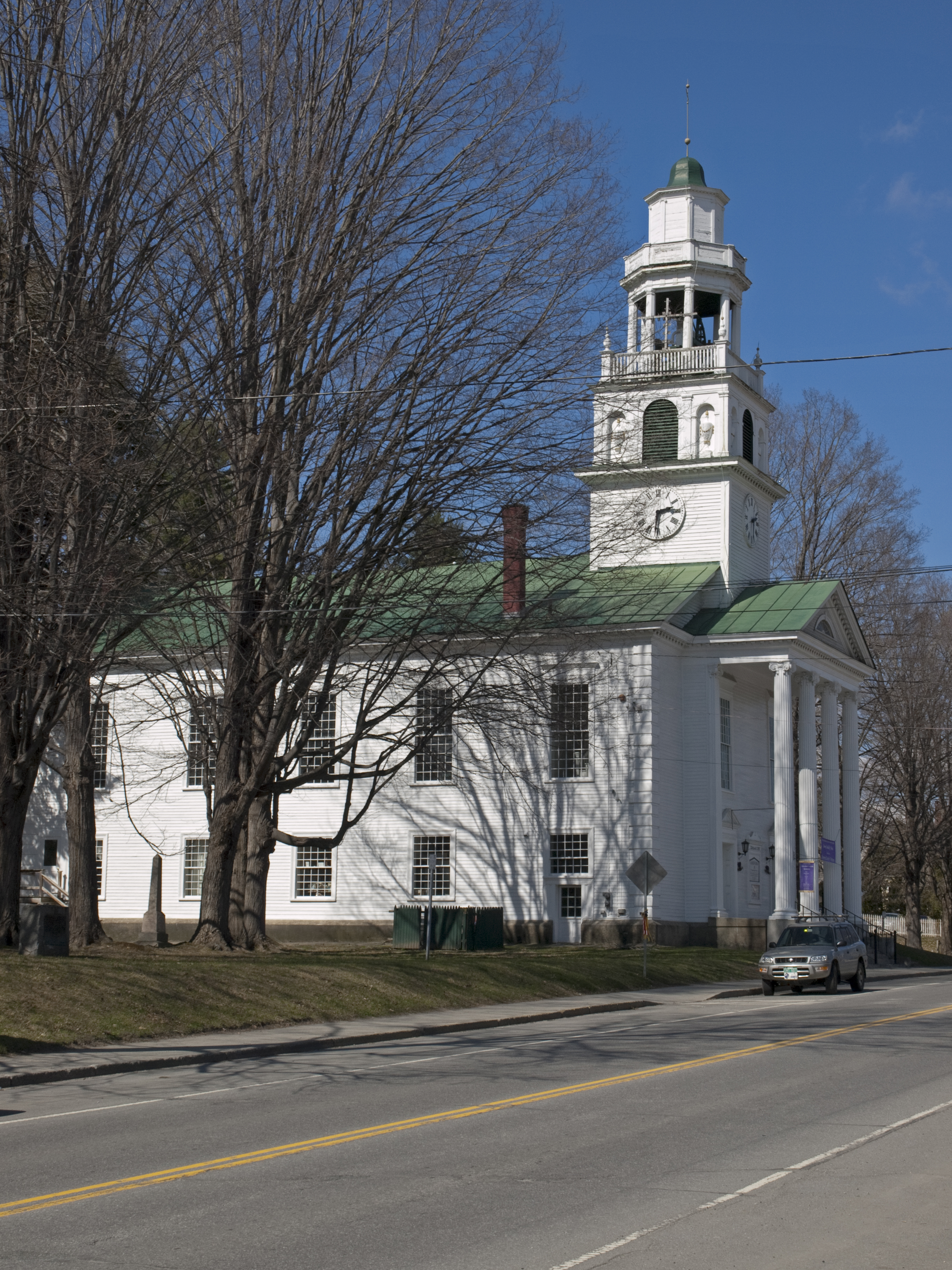
Old South Congregational Church, 1798, Windsor, Vermont

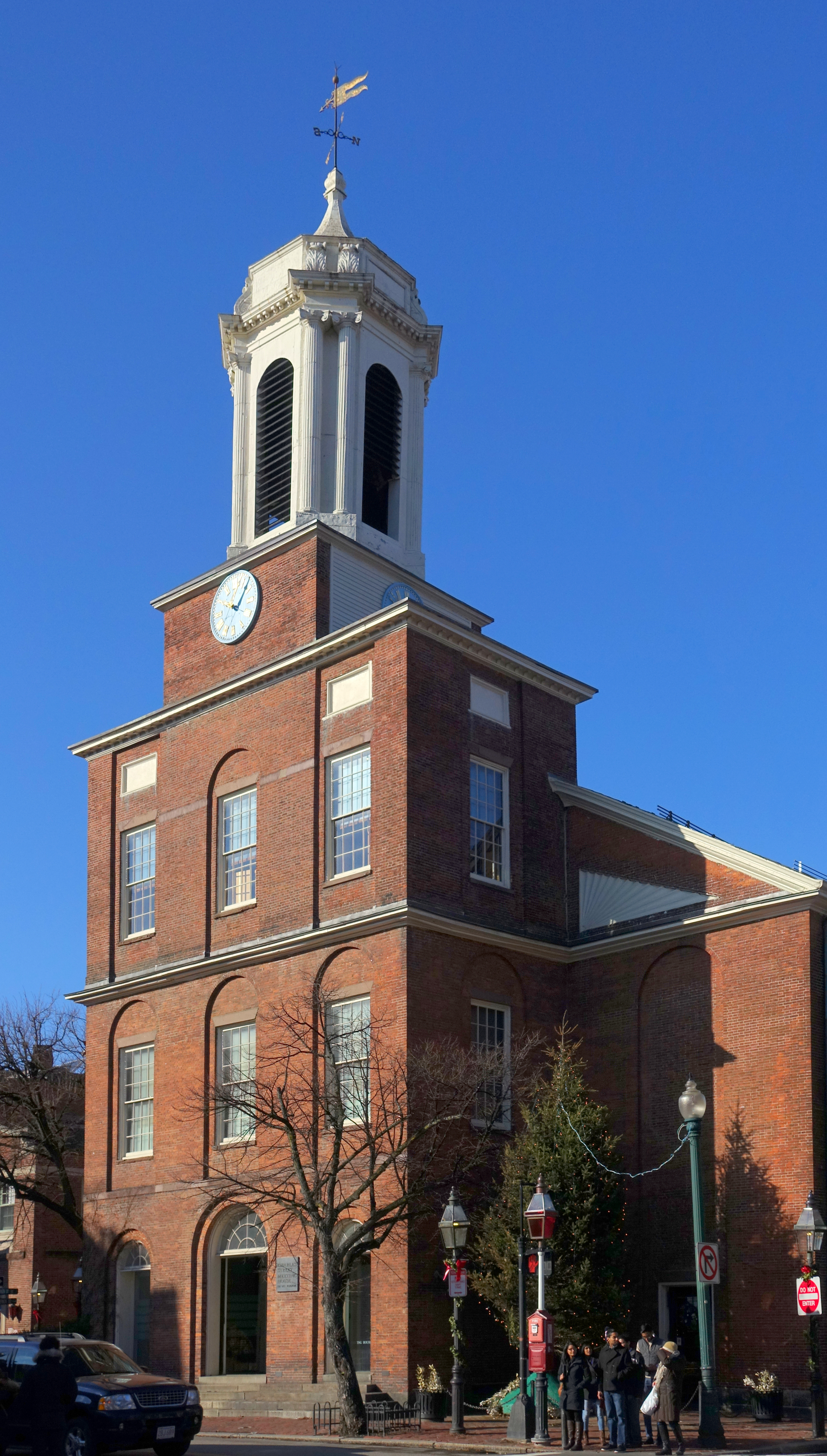
Charles Street Meeting House, 1804, Boston

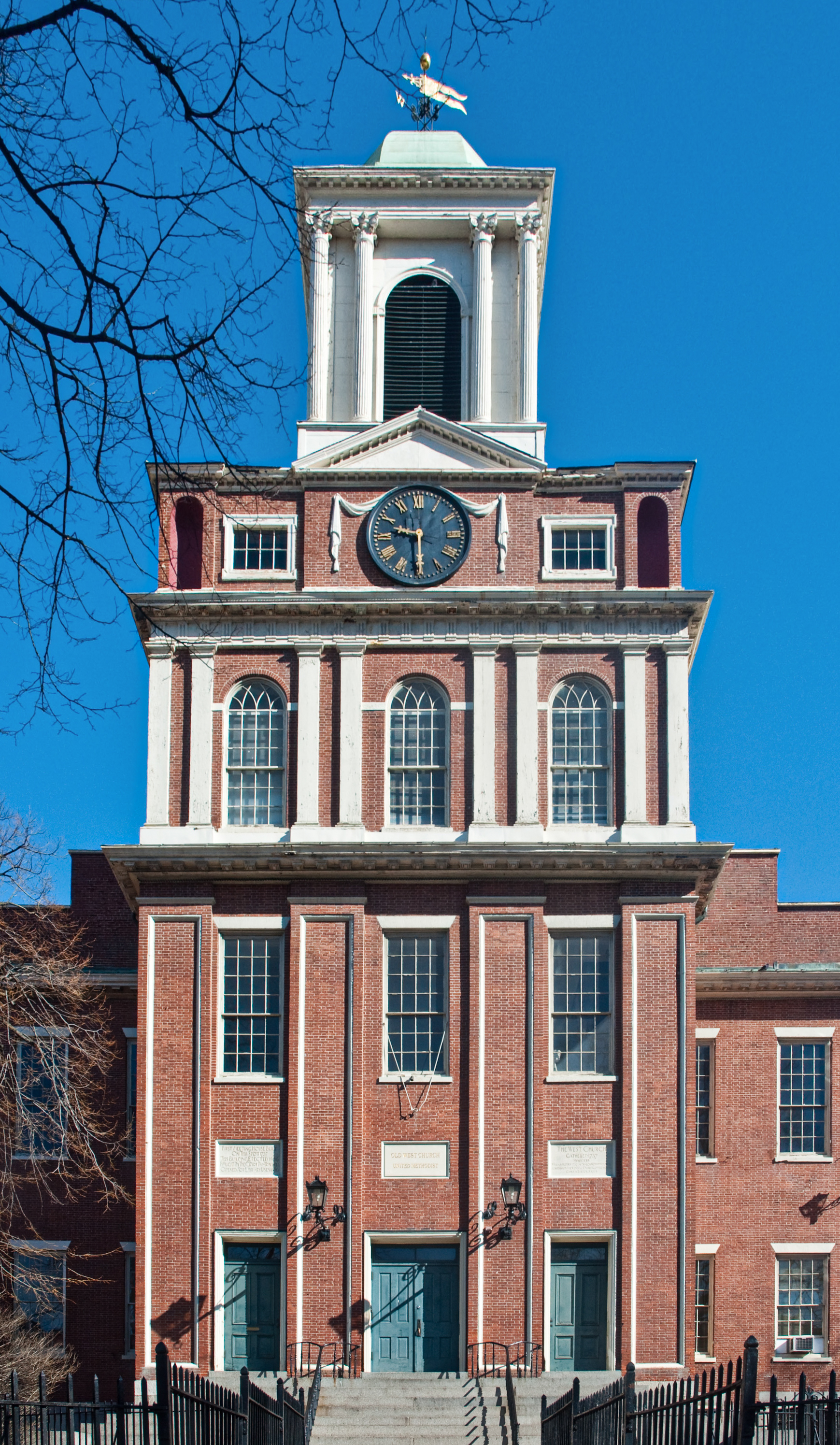
Old West Church, 1806, Boston

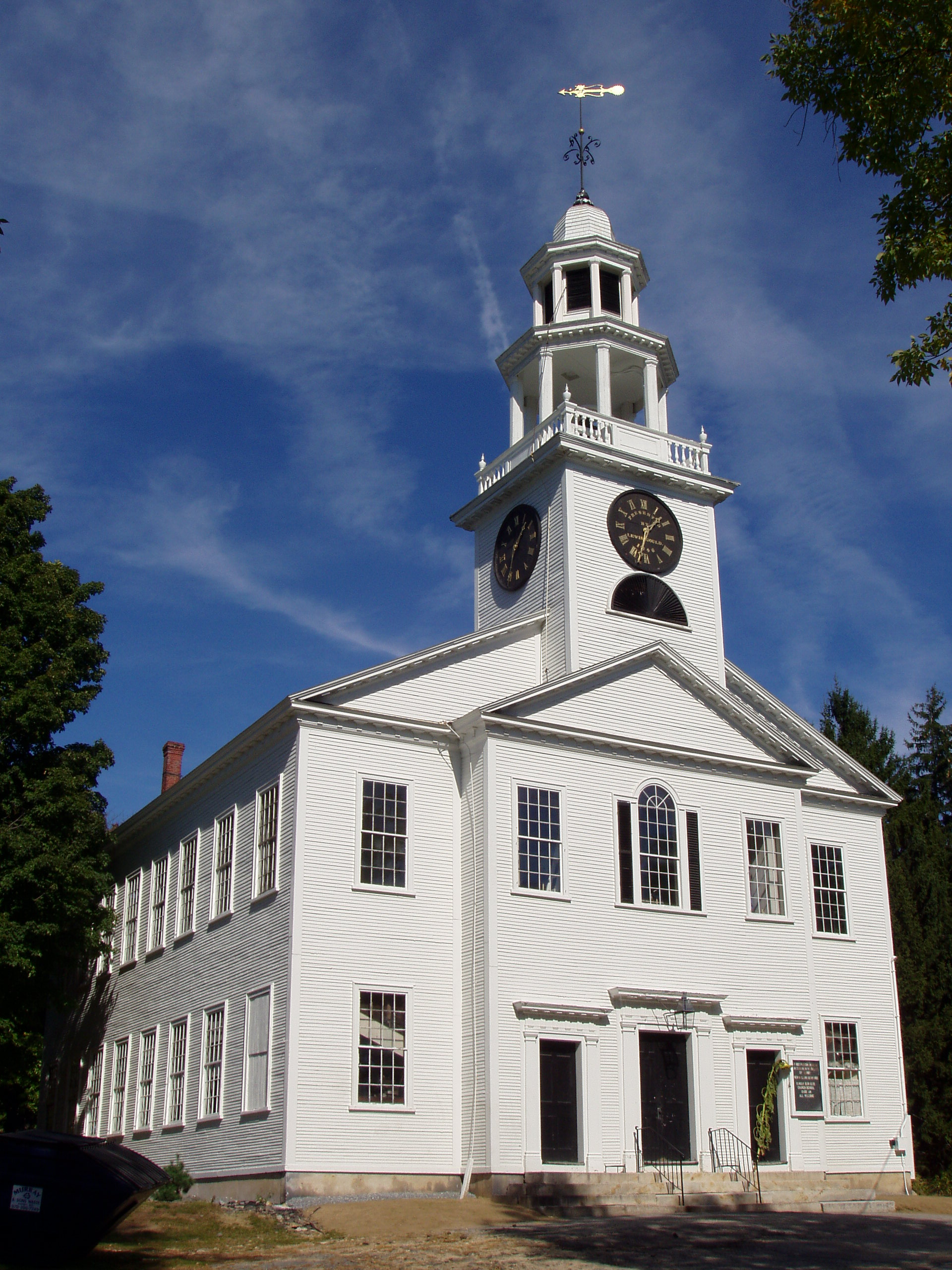
First Parish Church, 1809, Ashby, Massachusetts

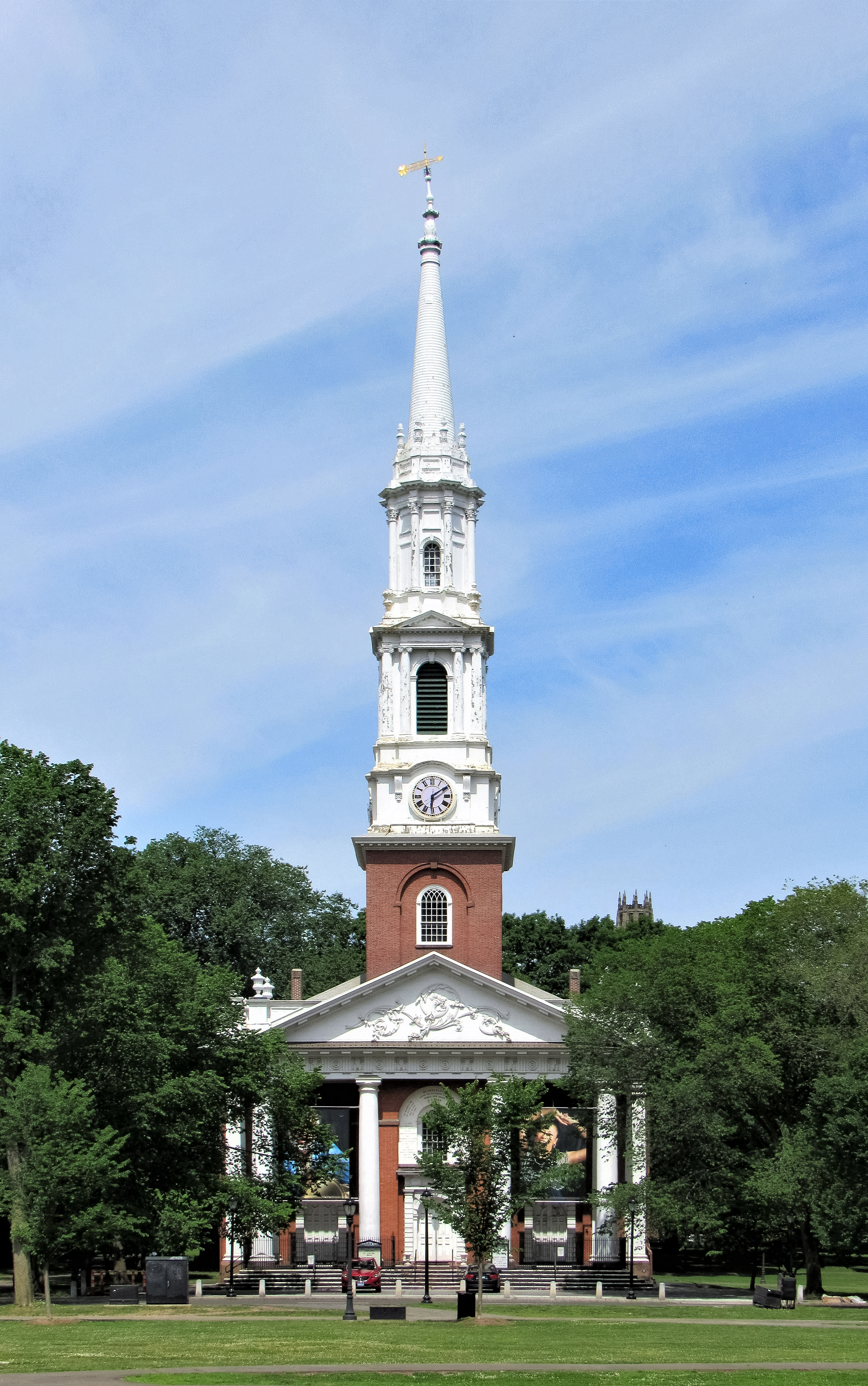
Center Church on the Green, 1812–1814, New Haven, Connecticut

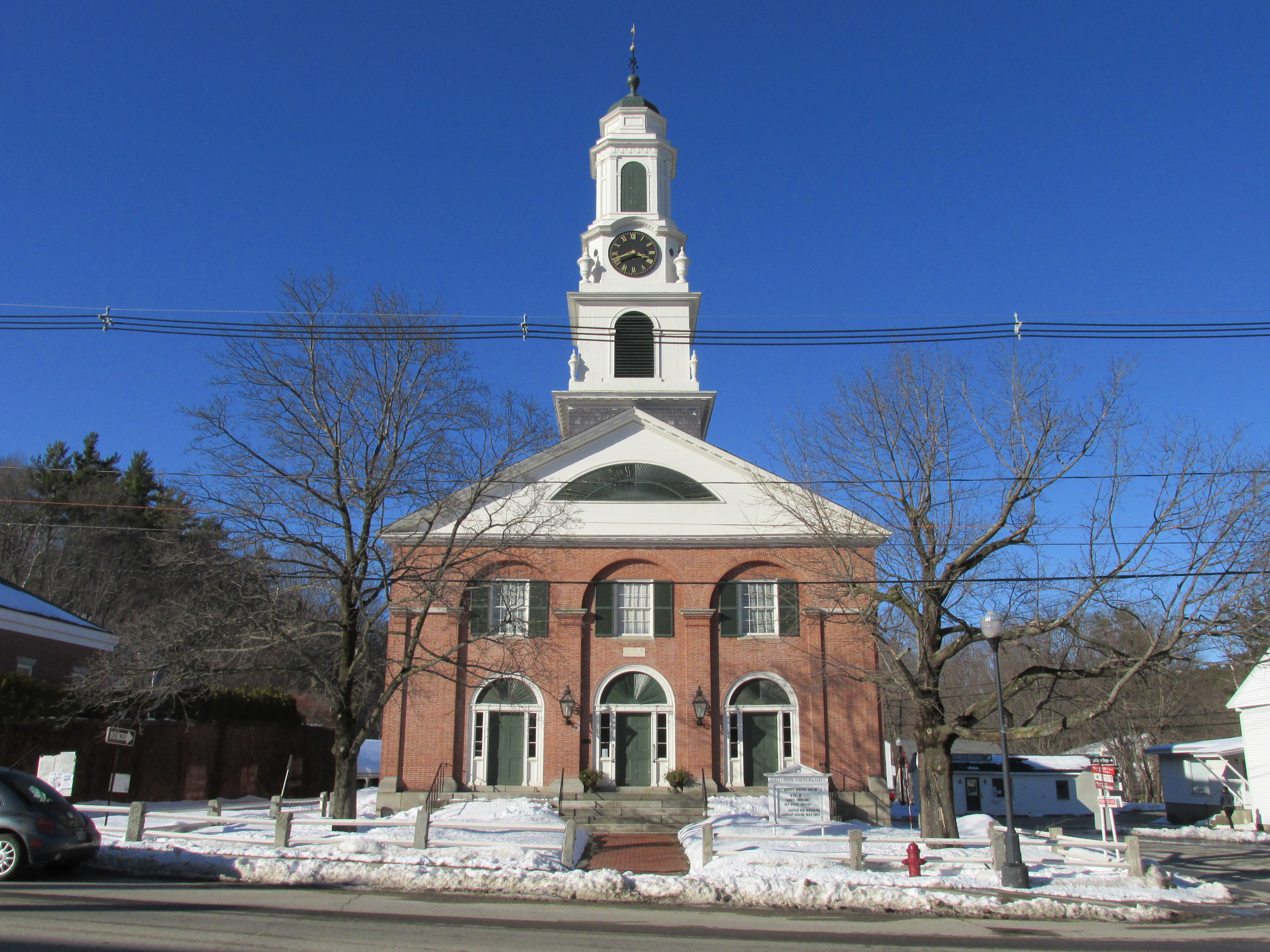
Unitarian Church, 1825, Peterborough, New Hampshire

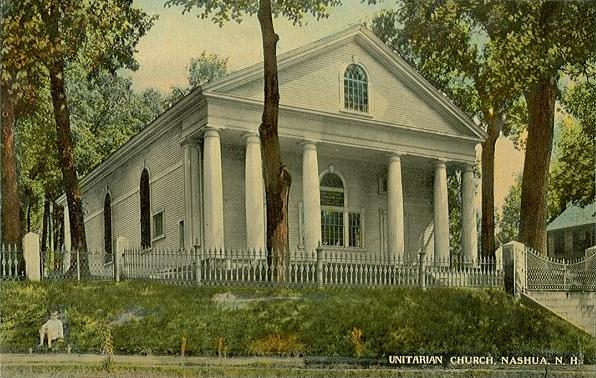
Unitarian Church, 1827, Nashua, New Hampshire

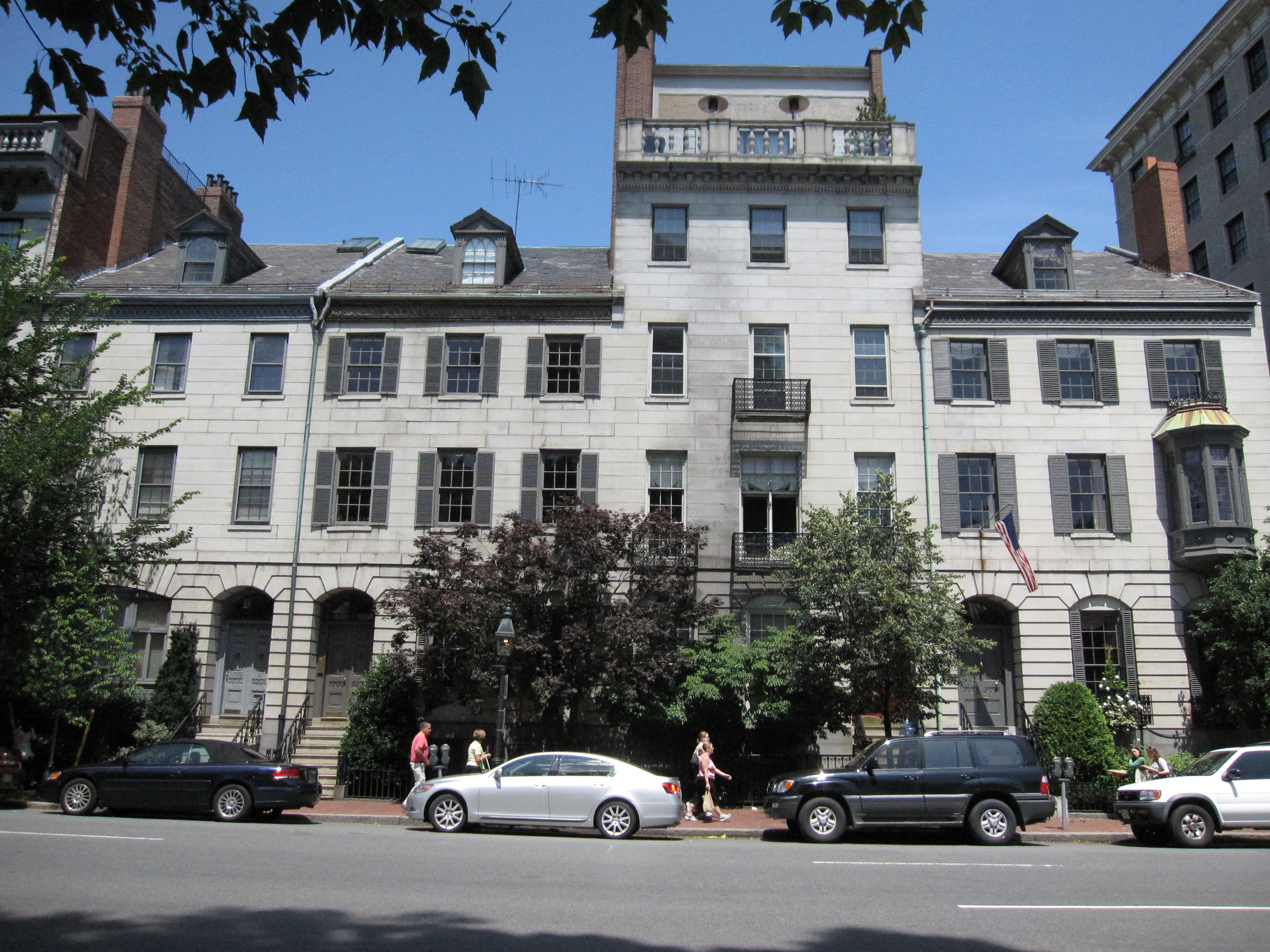
70-75 Beacon Street, 1828, Boston

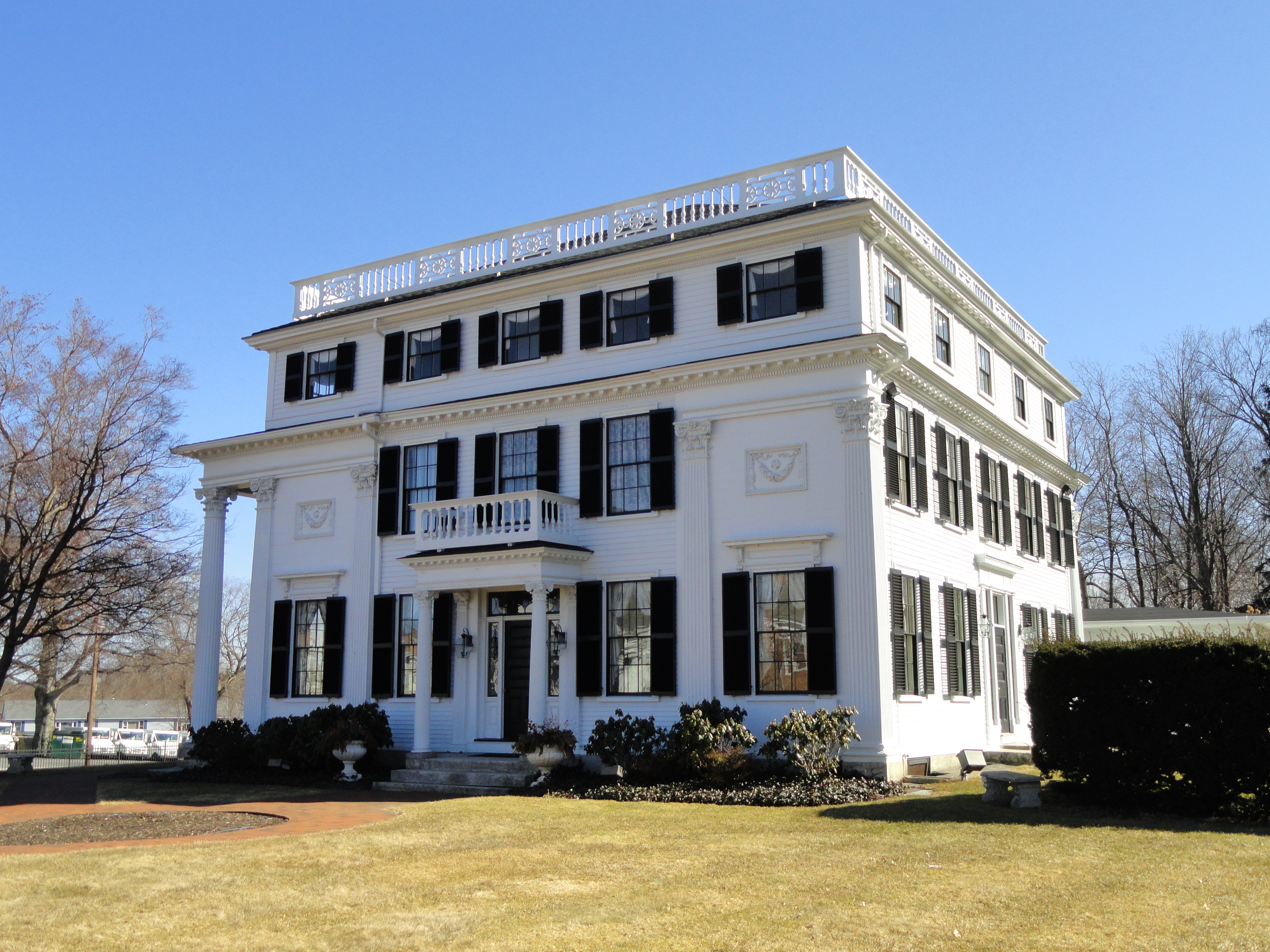
Asa Waters Mansion, Millbury, Massachusetts

== See also ==
- New Hampshire historical marker no. 33: The Ridge
