= National Register of Historic Places listings in Licking County, Ohio =

Location of Licking County in Ohio

This is a list of the National Register of Historic Places listings in Licking County, Ohio.

This is intended to be a complete list of the properties and districts on the National Register of Historic Places in Licking County, Ohio, United States. The locations of National Register properties and districts for which the latitude and longitude coordinates are included below, may be seen in an online map.

There are 65 properties and districts listed on the National Register in the county, including 1 National Historic Landmark.

This National Park Service list is complete through NPS recent listings posted October 30, 2026.

== Current listings ==
	Name on the Register	Image	Date listed	Location	City or town	Description
1	Alligator Effigy Mound	Alligator Effigy Mound	November 5, 1971 (#71000643)	End of Bryn Du Dr. 40°04′12″N 82°30′04″W	Granville	
2	Avery-Hunter House	Avery-Hunter House	December 27, 1979 (#79001877)	221 E. Broadway; 40°04′03″N 82°31′04″W	Granville	
3	A.A. Bancroft House	A.A. Bancroft House	November 28, 1980 (#80003135)	N. Pearl St. and Washington Dr. 40°04′27″N 82°31′06″W	Granville	
4	Belle Hall Covered Bridge	Belle Hall Covered Bridge	October 22, 1976 (#76001464)	East of Hartford on Dutch Cross Rd. 40°14′08″N 82°38′26″W	Bennington Township	
5	Bethel Baptist Church	Bethel Baptist Church	September 22, 1983 (#83001990)	Vine and Cedar Sts. 40°00′00″N 82°40′40″W	Pataskala	
6	Bryn Mawr	Bryn Mawr	March 29, 1983 (#83001991)	3758 Lancaster Rd., SW., south of Granville; 40°02′06″N 82°31′25″W	Union Township	
7	Buxton Inn	Buxton Inn	December 26, 1972 (#72001029)	313 E. Broadway; 40°04′03″N 82°30′58″W	Granville	
8	Wallace W. Carpenter House	Wallace W. Carpenter House	November 28, 1980 (#80003136)	323 Summit Dr. 40°04′11″N 82°30′57″W	Granville	
9	Casterton House	Casterton House	September 22, 1983 (#83001992)	105 Broadway; 39°59′37″N 82°40′42″W	Pataskala	
10	Cedar Hill Cemetery Buildings	Cedar Hill Cemetery Buildings	April 13, 1977 (#77001071)	Cedar St. 40°04′04″N 82°23′10″W	Newark	
11	Contract Airmail Route 34 Columbus-Philadelphia Route Marker 2		February 3, 2025 (#100011411)	530 Heath Road (Newark–Heath Airport); 40°01′21″N 82°27′51″W	Heath	
12	Courthouse Center	Courthouse Center	November 29, 1979 (#79001879)	35-37 S. Park Pl. and junction of S. Park and S. 2nd St. 40°03′26″N 82°24′03″W	Newark	
13	Curry Farm Historic District		June 18, 2021 (#100006649)	12844 Foundation Rd. 40°14′44″N 82°43′49″W	Hartford	
14	The Dawes Arboretum	The Dawes Arboretum	August 11, 2016 (#16000525)	7770 Jacksontown Rd., SE. 39°58′44″N 82°25′01″W	Licking Township	
15	Dixon Mound	Dixon Mound	June 4, 1973 (#73001494)	Next to the Homer Public Library in Homer; 40°15′05″N 82°31′28″W	Burlington Township	
16	Dustin Cabin	Dustin Cabin	November 28, 1980 (#80003137)	597 N. Pearl St. 40°04′30″N 82°31′08″W	Granville	
17	Elliot House	Elliot House	November 14, 1983 (#83004315)	301 S. Main St. 39°59′49″N 82°40′32″W	Pataskala	
18	Etna Township Mounds I And II	Etna Township Mounds I And II	September 5, 1975 (#75001457)	East of Reynoldsburg off Interstate 70	Etna Township	
19	Evans-Holton-Owens House	Evans-Holton-Owens House	October 16, 1986 (#86002874)	162 W. Locust St. 40°03′32″N 82°24′38″W	Newark	Destroyed by fire in 2009
20	Flint Ridge State Memorial	Flint Ridge State Memorial	November 10, 1970 (#70000505)	2 mi (3.2 km) north of Brownsville; 39°59′10″N 82°16′04″W	Hopewell Township	
21	Fuller House	Fuller House	March 22, 1991 (#91000304)	203 N. Main St. 40°14′13″N 82°27′10″W	Utica	
22	Granville Historic District	Granville Historic District	November 28, 1980 (#80003138)	State Route 37; 40°04′04″N 82°31′10″W	Granville	
23	Home Building Association Bank	Home Building Association Bank	July 2, 1973 (#73001495)	6 W. Main St. 40°03′28″N 82°24′09″W	Newark	
24	Hudson Avenue Historic District	Hudson Avenue Historic District	March 18, 1987 (#86003506)	Hudson Ave. between Stevens St. and State Route 16; 40°04′10″N 82°24′30″W	Newark	
25	Hull Place	Hull Place	December 21, 1979 (#79001880)	686 W. Main St. 40°03′08″N 82°25′43″W	Newark	
26	Jersey Independent Order of Odd Fellows Hall	Jersey Independent Order of Odd Fellows Hall	March 22, 2018 (#100002232)	10424 Morse Rd., SW. 40°03′13″N 82°43′22″W	Jersey Township	
27	Johnstown Jail	Johnstown Jail	April 18, 2003 (#03000274)	66 W. Pratt St. 40°09′06″N 82°41′08″W	Johnstown	
28	Warren F. Kauber Funeral Home	Warren F. Kauber Funeral Home	September 22, 1983 (#83001993)	289 S. Main St. 39°59′50″N 82°40′32″W	Pataskala	
29	Licking County Courthouse	Licking County Courthouse	March 20, 1973 (#73001496)	Courthouse Sq. 40°03′28″N 82°24′06″W	Newark	
30	Lynnwood Farm	Lynnwood Farm	June 22, 1979 (#79001878)	South of Johnstown at 4986 Caswell Rd. 40°07′40″N 82°40′22″W	Monroe Township	
31	McCune's Villa	McCune's Villa	April 22, 1982 (#82003602)	537 Jones Rd., northeast of Granville; 40°05′07″N 82°29′33″W	Granville Township	
32	McDaniel Mound		May 2, 1974 (#74001545)	Address Restricted	Washington Township	Near Utica
33	McNamar-McLure-Miller Residence	McNamar-McLure-Miller Residence	June 17, 1982 (#82003603)	124 W. Main St. 40°03′24″N 82°24′27″W	Newark	
34	Mead House	Mead House	September 22, 1983 (#83001994)	245 S. Main St. 39°59′54″N 82°40′33″W	Pataskala	
35	Melick Mound		March 27, 1974 (#74001546)	South of the North Fork of the Licking River, near Utica	Washington Township	
36	Monroe Township Hall-Opera House	Monroe Township Hall-Opera House	July 6, 1981 (#81000446)	1 S. Main St. 40°09′14″N 82°41′04″W	Johnstown	
37	Newark Downtown Historic District	Newark Downtown Historic District	January 15, 2002 (#01001482)	Roughly bounded by Church St., 2nd St., 5th St., and Canal St. 40°03′29″N 82°24′12″W	Newark	
38	Newark Earthworks	Newark Earthworks	October 15, 1966 (#66000614)	Roughly bounded by Union, 30th, James, and Waldo Sts., and State Route 16; 40°03′07″N 82°26′55″W	Heath and Newark	
39	Newark High School	Newark High School	September 14, 2015 (#15000613)	112 W. Main St., 9 N. 5th St. 40°03′24″N 82°24′24″W	Newark	Now McGuffey Elementary School
40	Oakwood	Oakwood	May 29, 1980 (#80003141)	64-70 Penney Ave. 40°03′41″N 82°23′03″W	Newark	
41	Ohio Canal Groundbreaking Site	Ohio Canal Groundbreaking Site	May 24, 1973 (#73001493)	State Route 79; 40°00′46″N 82°27′27″W	Heath	
42	Old Colony Burying Ground	Old Colony Burying Ground	June 10, 2005 (#05000577)	250 S. Main St. 40°03′55″N 82°31′12″W	Granville	
43	Outville Depot	Outville Depot	August 22, 1995 (#95001034)	6750 Outville Rd., SW., east of Pataskala; 39°59′41″N 82°35′49″W	Harrison Township	
44	Outville Hay and Grain Company Building	Outville Hay and Grain Company Building	March 22, 2018 (#100002233)	6641 Outville Rd., SW. 39°59′41″N 82°35′47″W	Harrison Township	
45	Pataskala Banking Company	Pataskala Banking Company	September 22, 1983 (#83001996)	354 S. Main St. 39°59′45″N 82°40′31″W	Pataskala	
46	Pataskala Elementary School	Pataskala Elementary School	September 22, 1983 (#83001995)	396 S. High St. 40°00′00″N 82°40′42″W	Pataskala	
47	Pataskala Jail	Pataskala Jail	September 22, 1983 (#83001997)	Main St. 39°59′56″N 82°40′31″W	Pataskala	
48	Pataskala Presbyterian Church	Pataskala Presbyterian Church	November 14, 1983 (#83004323)	Atkinson and Main Sts. 39°59′40″N 82°40′32″W	Pataskala	
49	Pataskala Town Hall	Pataskala Town Hall	September 22, 1983 (#83001998)	430 Main St. 39°59′38″N 82°40′30″W	Pataskala	
50	Pataskala United Methodist Church	Pataskala United Methodist Church	September 22, 1983 (#83001999)	458 S. Main St. 39°59′36″N 82°40′30″W	Pataskala	
51	Pennsylvania Railway Station	Pennsylvania Railway Station	November 29, 1979 (#79001881)	25 E. Walnut St. 40°03′20″N 82°24′02″W	Newark	
52	Anthony Pitzer Jr. House	Anthony Pitzer Jr. House	August 25, 1988 (#88001297)	6019 White Chapel Rd., south of Newark; 39°59′54″N 82°25′41″W	Licking Township	
53	Peter F. Rhoads House	Peter F. Rhoads House	November 28, 1980 (#80003142)	74 Granville St. 40°03′38″N 82°24′34″W	Newark	
54	Rodrick Bridge	Rodrick Bridge	May 22, 1998 (#98000442)	North of Granville Rd. between Hall Ave. and Village Dr. W 40°04′05″N 82°26′26″W	Newark	Moved; originally located southeast of Coshocton, Ohio
55	Rogers House	Rogers House	November 28, 1980 (#80003139)	304 N. Pearl St. 40°04′13″N 82°30′59″W	Granville	
56	Capt. Levi Rose House	Capt. Levi Rose House	November 28, 1980 (#80003140)	631 N. Pearl St. 40°03′59″N 82°31′15″W	Granville	
57	St. Luke's Episcopal Church	St. Luke's Episcopal Church	April 26, 1976 (#76001465)	111 E. Broadway St. 40°04′03″N 82°31′11″W	Granville	
58	Martin Shaub Mill Site/House	Martin Shaub Mill Site/House	January 23, 1985 (#85000119)	8259 Duncan Plains Rd., northwest of Alexandria; 40°06′25″N 82°38′53″W	St. Albans Township	
59	Sherwood-Davidson and Buckingham Houses	Sherwood-Davidson and Buckingham Houses	November 10, 1977 (#77001072)	W. Main and 6th Sts. 40°03′23″N 82°24′36″W	Newark	
60	Shield's Block	Shield's Block	November 29, 1978 (#78002101)	23-29 S. Park Pl. 40°03′26″N 82°24′03″W	Newark	
61	Edwin Stanbery Office		November 30, 1978 (#78002100)	1 mi (1.6 km) east of central Granville; 40°04′03″N 82°30′31″W	Granville	
62	Upham-Wright House	Upham-Wright House	June 22, 1979 (#79001882)	342 Granville St. 40°03′49″N 82°25′10″W	Newark	
63	Upland Farm	Upland Farm	December 1, 1978 (#78002102)	North of Newark off State Route 657; 40°10′31″N 82°27′07″W	Newton Township	
64	West Side Planing Mill (rear)	West Side Planing Mill (rear)	January 21, 1983 (#83002000)	197 Maholm St. 40°03′03″N 82°25′40″W	Newark	
65	Elias Williams House	Elias Williams House	April 16, 1979 (#79001883)	565 Granville St. 40°03′53″N 82°25′39″W	Newark	

== See also ==
- List of National Historic Landmarks in Ohio
- Listings in neighboring counties: Coshocton, Delaware, Fairfield, Franklin, Knox, Muskingum, Perry
- National Register of Historic Places listings in Ohio
