= Licking Heights High School =

Public, coeducational high school in Pataskala, Ohio, United States

Location
- 4101 Summit Road; Pataskala, Ohio, (Licking County) 43062; United States; 40°1′41.2″N 82°44′44.1″W

Information
- Type: Public, Coeducational high school
- Established: 1957
- School district: Licking Heights Local School District
- School code: LHHS
- Teaching staff: 67.83 (FTE)
- Grades: 9-12
- Enrollment: 1,428 (2024-25)
- Average class size: 300
- Student to teacher ratio: 21.05
- Campus: Suburban/rural
- Colors: Maroon and gold
- Athletics conference: Licking County League
- Sports: Football, boys volleyball, girls volleyball, boys soccer, girls soccer, cross country, boys basketball, girls basketball, wrestling, baseball, softball, boys track and field, girls track and field
- Mascot: Hornet
- Team name: Hornets
- Rival: Watkins Memorial Warriors
- Accreditation: North Central Association of Colleges and Schools
- Newspaper: "A Peek at Heights"
- Communities served: Pataskala, Blacklick, Reynoldsburg, Johnstown
- Website: www.lhschools.org/HighSchool_home.aspx

Licking Heights High School is a public high school in Pataskala, Ohio. It is the only high school in the Licking Heights Local School District. Their school mascot is the Hornet.

== History ==
In November 2018, construction began on a new high school for the school district. What was the first high school building, initially built in 2003, became the new middle school, with the new high school finishing construction in August 2020.

A new extension was added in November 2024 for an accommodation of approximately 300-350 more students.

== Academics ==
The school provides approximately 10 AP courses, along with several Dual Enrollment courses through the Central Ohio Technical College, and other local colleges providing opportunities for higher-level course credits (OU Pickerington, Columbus State). The first National Merit Finalist from Licking Heights High School earned that distinction in 2013.

== Activities ==
Licking Heights High School has performing arts, athletics, and academic programs/clubs to join.

=== Student Council ===
The student council's goal is to promote school spirit, enact change in the school, and be leaders for their peers. It is composed of the president, vice-president, secretary, publicity team, historians, and more sub-groups are added when needed.

Events held in the past have included Pep Rallies, Powder Puff for cancer awareness, Spirit Week, and flower donations. Proceeds were sent to nearby homeless shelters or to centers for children.

=== National Honor Society ===
- Quiz Bowl
- DECA
- Various student organizations, including Drama Club and Chess Club
- Newspaper and Yearbook Organizations
- Environmental Club
- Annual musical production
- Choral program (including Advanced Choruses that travel biannually to NYC and an Acapella Jazz Choir)
- Band

== Marching Band ==
The Licking Heights Marching Band is known for integrating their unique and engaging marching style with quality music. They have been a prominent fixture at the OMEA State Marching Band Finals, having earned a superior rating for the past 15 seasons. Currently, the LHMB is ranked at Class AA in OMEA standards, and achieves consistently high scores and placements at competitions in their class.

Past shows Include:

- Music of Billy Joel
- Song of the Sirens
- Castle On a Cloud
- Three Wishes
- Wicked
- Vesuvius
- UnBREAKable
- One of THEM
- Human After All
- Queen Bee
- River Songs
- Disco Inferno
- En Route
- My Immortal
- The Fates

Videos of the Licking Heights Marching Band can be found on YouTube dating back to 1978.

== Licking Heights Youth Association, Inc. ==
The primary objective of the Licking Heights Youth Association is to promote youth athletics in the community by fostering growth and encouraging interest and participation.

== Ohio High School Athletic Association State Championships ==
- Boys Wrestling – 1976, 1977, 1985
- Boys Track and Field – 1987

== Notable alumni ==
- Ronnie Dawson (2013), professional baseball outfielder for the Cincinnati Reds.
- Josiah Harrell (2017), professional mixed martial artist.
