= Buxton Inn =

Coordinates: 40°04′03″N 82°30′58″W

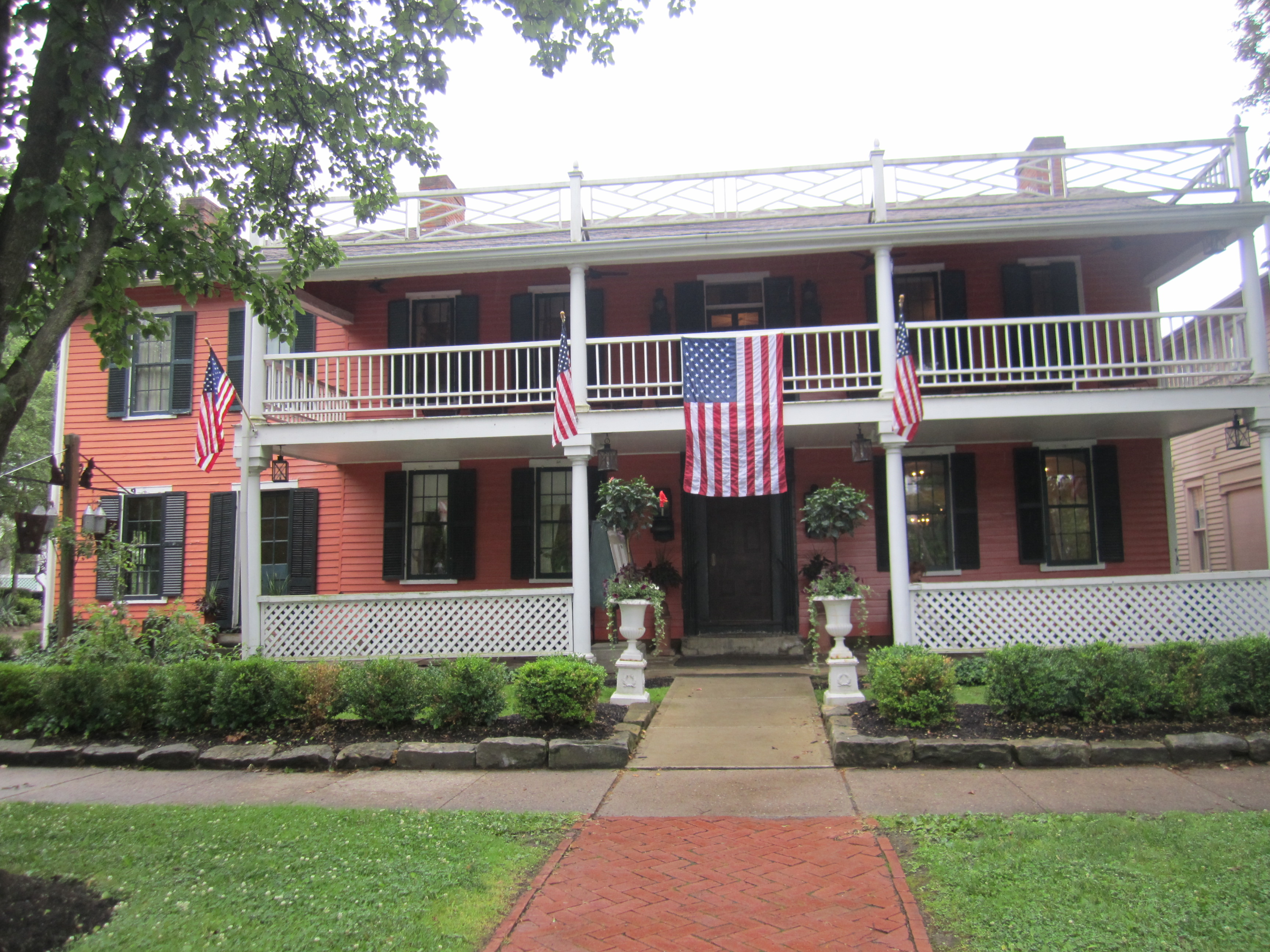
Buxton Inn

The Buxton Inn, located in Granville, Ohio, is one of Ohio's oldest inns. It was built in 1812 by Orrin Granger, and has operated as a tavern and inn almost continuously since then. The Buxton Inn currently has 25 lodging rooms that are spread across the five houses that make up the inn. Many notable guests are rumored to have stayed in the inn, including a couple of U.S. presidents. The Buxton Inn is also infamous for its reports of paranormal activity in the hotel from the workers and guests who have stayed there.

== Description ==
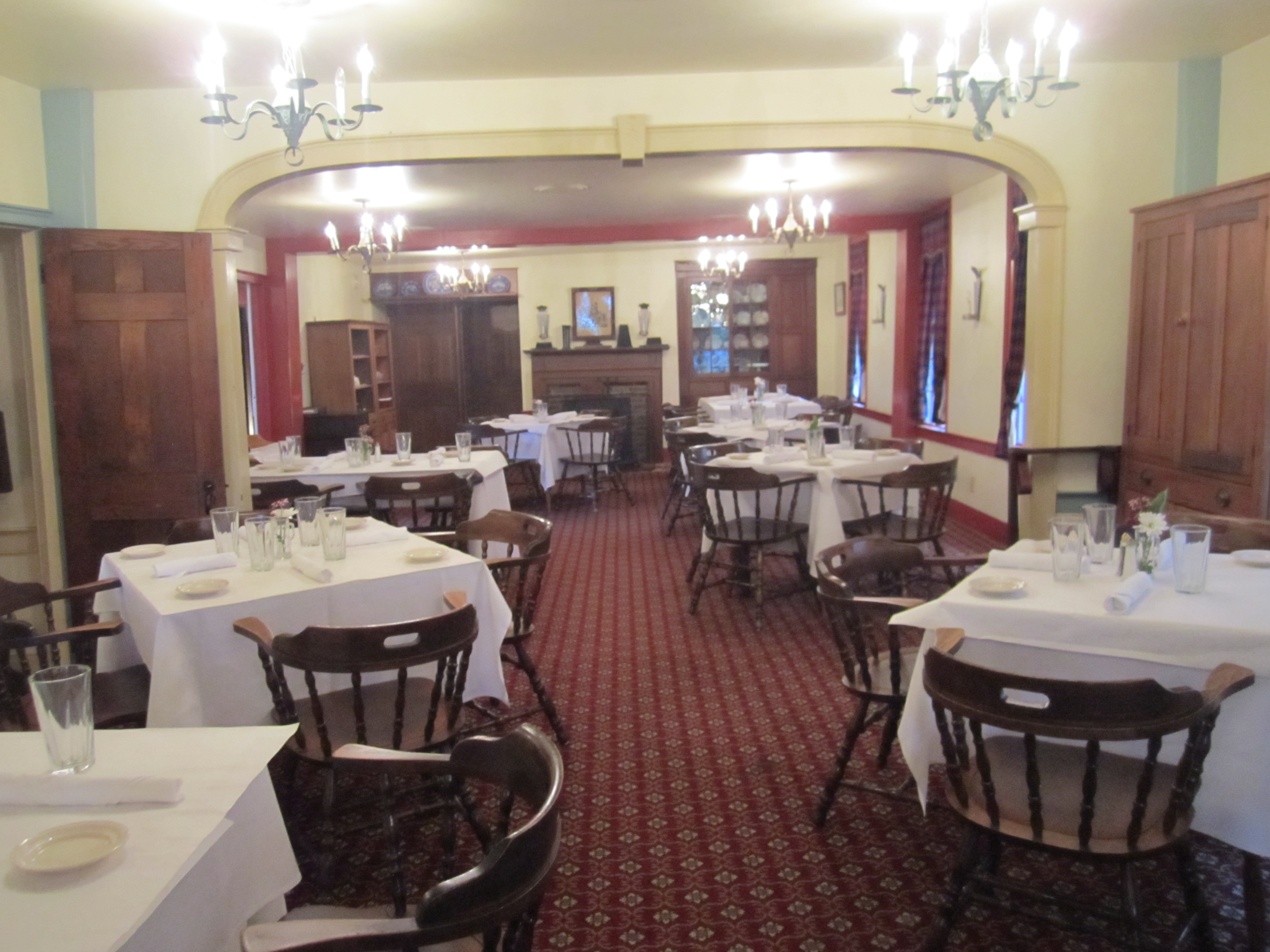
Dining room in the Buxton Inn

The Buxton Inn consists of five houses and a courtyard that sits in between the wings of the L-shaped main house. The two-story inn is painted red and has white columns that line the two-story front porch. The main house, where guests check-in, has four rooms a restaurant with a bar. The floor in the main house is slightly uneven due to wear and tear throughouts its 200-year existence. The main level has multiple living rooms with pictures of the inn throughout the decades on the walls. According to local lore, the inn's basement has a secret tunnel that was used by the Underground Railroad. The other four houses contain only guest rooms and are not connected to each other.

== History ==
When it first opened in 1812 by Orrin Granger, The Buxton Inn was called "The Tavern." It served not only as a place to lodge but also as a post office. According to some accounts, the inn housed people fleeing slavery in the era of the Underground Railroad. James W. Dilley purchased the inn in 1858 and renamed it The Dilley House. Its name was changed to the Buxton Inn in 1865 when Major Horton Buxton bought it. When Buxton died in 1934, Ethel Bonnie, an opera singer, succeeded him as owner. She was resided in Room 9 of the inn with her cat, "Major Buxton," until she died in 1960. Nell Schoeller, who had previously supported Bonnie, became the next owner of the inn. Local preservationists Orville and Audrey Orr acquired the Buxton Inn in 1972, refurbishing and renewing it. That year, on December 26, the Buxton Inn was added to the National Register of Historic Places.

During their time operating the Buxton Inn, the Orrs successfully restored its reputation by expanding the business from its original three guest rooms to a 20-room inn with a restaurant, bar, and wine storage. The Orrs owned the property for 42 years until Robert Schilling and his two daughters purchased the inn in 2014. Restoration continued under their ownership, with improvements to both the interior and exterior. They enlarged and opened up the lobby and upgraded the lighting and restrooms.

In October 2022, the Buxton Inn suffered significant damage from a kitchen fire caused by an electrical issue. Although no lives were lost, the fire left broken doors, soot, and damaged ceilings that forced the inn to close for several months to undergo repairs. The inn underwent extensive renovations, and updates were made to several guest rooms and 14 bathrooms. The owners added new walls and refurbished rooms and restaurant. In September 2024, the Buxton Inn was put up for sale.

== Paranormal activity ==
The Buxton Inn is said to be haunted by numerous staff members, owners, and guests. Guests and staff have said they have seen these spirits roaming the halls and visiting the rooms, as well as interfering with the lights. The ghosts are reported to be Ethel “Bonnie” Bounell, who died in room 9 at the inn and was an owner in 1934, her cat Major Buxton, and Major Horton Buxton.

== Notable guests ==
Buxton Inn has a rich history of hosting many notable guests, including U.S. presidents such as William H. Harrison, Abraham Lincoln, and William McKinley. Notably, William H. Harrison was a friend of Orrin Granger. It has also welcomed celebrities like actresses Jennifer Garner, Dixie Carter, and Cameron Diaz, along with author Harriet Beecher Stowe, who is renowned for writing Uncle Tom's Cabin, and celebrated cellist Yo-Yo Ma.
