= Pataskala Presbyterian Church =

- U.S. National Register of Historic Places
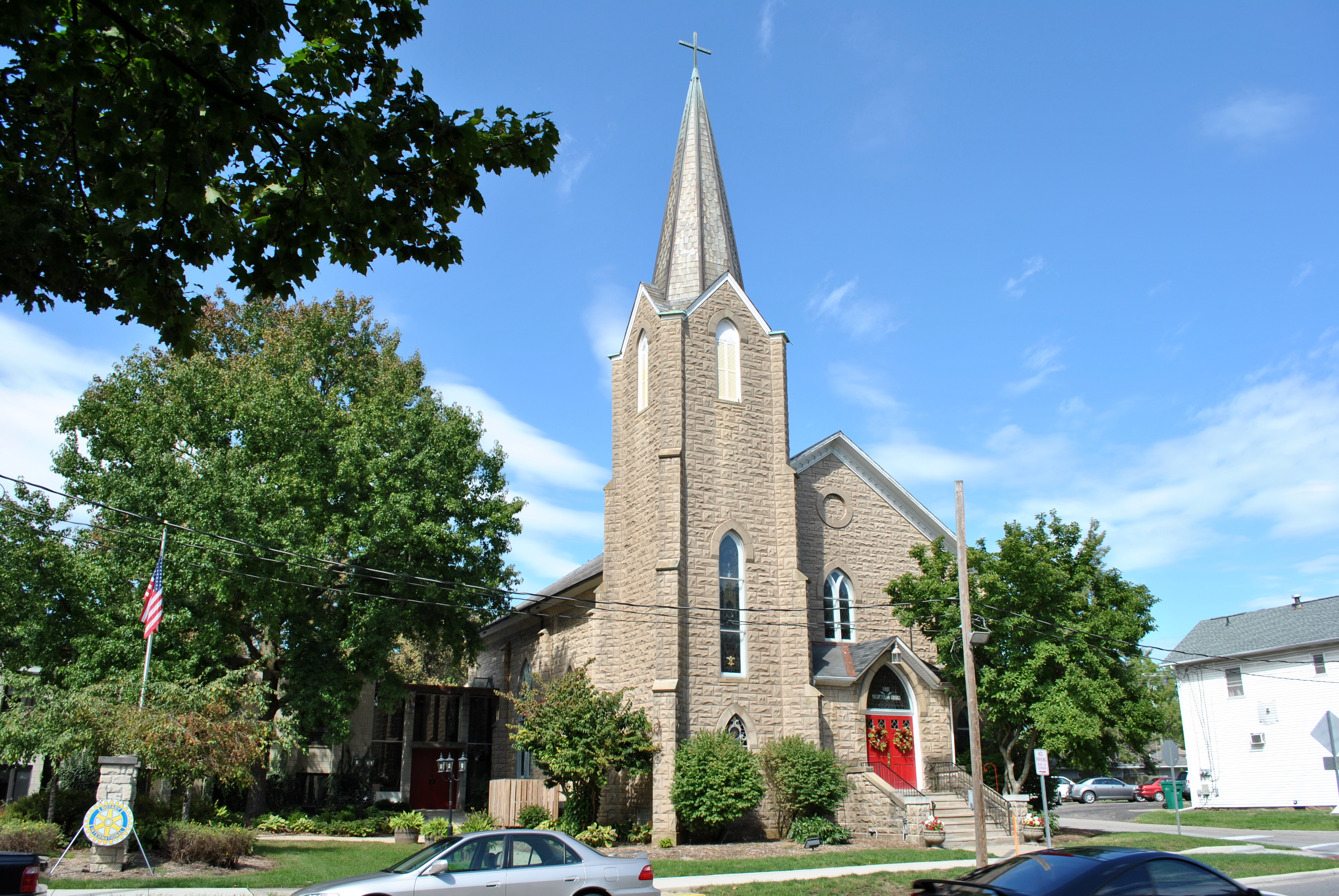

- Location within Ohio Location within the United States
- Location: Atkinson and Main Sts., Pataskala, Ohio
- Coordinates: 39°59′20″N 83°1′37″W
- Area: less than one acre
- Built: 1868
- Architectural style: Gothic Revival
- MPS: Pataskala MRA
- NRHP reference No.: 83004323
- Added to NRHP: November 14, 1983

Pataskala Presbyterian Church is a historic church at Atkinson and Main Streets in Pataskala, Ohio. It was built in 1868 and added to the National Register in 1983. It is the oldest church building in Pataskala that is still used as a church.

The church congregation was founded in 1837, meeting first in Harrison Township in the barn of local area resident Joseph Baird and then at a log school house in Lima Township. With no regular meeting place, services were held in a variety of locations, including schoolhouses, the Methodist Church in Etna, at the Conine grist mill, and in barns. Then from 1852 to 1868, it met in a frame structure. When this frame structure became unsafe, a lot was purchased in Pataskala for the current building. The church was constructed at a cost of $5000 in 1868.

The church was dedicated later, in 1870, and its bell hung in 1873. The original structure was brick, with the present stone facade added in about 1930. Sunday school rooms and a social hall were added to the basement in 1917. The sanctuary was remodeled in 1922 for the addition of a pipe organ and choir loft. The church's educational wing and a new social hall were added in 1969.

The structure was deemed significant for National Register listing "as an example of the Gothic Revival often used in churches during the mid-nineteenth century....

Expanding further, it was deemed "significant as an example of the Gothic Revival style and for its contribution to the religious history of the community. The Presbyterian religion was the earliest to be established in Pataskala and this, the second permanent building, is the largest and most architecturally distinct church with its Gothic Revival style details such as the spiraled corner bell tower, pointed arched windows and buttresses. The Presbyterian Church was organized in 1837 and was the earliest o£ the three major religions to be established in Pataskala, the other two being the United Methodist and the Evangelical United Brethren."

It was listed on the National Register as a follow-on to a 1980 study of historic resources in Pataskala.
