= Eleanor Youmans =

American women children's writer

Eleanor Youmans (September 7, 1876 – October 8, 1968) was an American author of children's novels, short stories, and poetry. She published a dozen novels through the Bobbs-Merrill Company. Her short stories appeared in The American Magazine, Child Life, and Junior Home. The subjects of her stories were often cats, dogs, and children. She is also known for writing about her Welsh heritage and the Welsh Hills of Licking County, Ohio.

== Early life and education ==
Youmans was born Eleanor Elizabeth Williams in Maxville, Missouri, in Jefferson County, to Missouri Harbison Williams and Dr. Charles Williams. She had one sister, Edwina. When her mother died in 1881, Youmans and her sister moved to Pataskala, Ohio, to live with their grandfather, Stephen C. Williams, and two of their aunts. The two sisters lived on their grandfather's farm in Pataskala until their father remarried in 1887. Youmans attended public school in Ohio and Missouri. She taught school for one year in Missouri after she graduated from Normal School, in DeSoto, Missouri, in 1894. She then relocated back to Ohio, first residing with relatives in Celina, then working in Canton, and later returning to Pataskala.

== Marriage and family ==
Youmans married Brigg M. Youmans who “was from an influential Pataskala business family” in 1900. They had one son, William C. Youmans, born in 1905.

== Writing career ==
Youmans's first published short story, "Hearts By Freight," was distributed in newspapers across the United States by the Associated Literary Press in 1910. When her son, William, was 12-years-old, he encouraged his mother to write, saying "Mother, you don’t write. You just talk about writing.” She went on to publish a short story, "The Man Who Wanted a Dog That Would Kill" in the October 1921 issue of The American Magazine, followed by twelve children's novels with the Bobbs-Merrill Company as well as an omnibus reprint of the first three Skitter Cat stories in The Skitter Cat Book published in 1947. Her 1930 novel, Teddy Horse, was also published by the London publisher Elkin Mathews and Marrot in 1931. She collaborated on three books with illustrator Will Rannells. Rannells was an art professor at The Ohio State University, member of the Capital Area Humane Society for over 60 years and its president from 1936-1939, and dog portrait artist. Youmans's books were endorsed by the American Library Association, selected as required readings for third and fourth grades in public schools, and certified as part of the Ohio Teachers' Reading circle circuit. Her novel Mount Delightful (1944) won an Ohioana Award for Juvenile Literature in 1945.

== Selected publications ==
- Skitter Cat. 1925
- Skitter Cat and Little Boy. 1926
- Skitter Cat and Major. 1927
- Skitter and Skeet. 1928
- Teddy Horse: The Story of a Runaway Pony. 1930
- Cinder: The Tale of a Black and Tan Toy Terrier. 1933
- Little Dog Mack: The Story of a Wirehaired Terrier. 1936
- Waif: The Story of Spe. 1937
- The Great Adventures of Jack, Jock, and Funny. 1938
- The Forest Road: Two Boys in the Ozarks. 1939
- Timmy: The Dog That Was Different. 1941
- Mount Delightful: The Story of Ellen Evans and Her Dog Taffy. 1944
- The Skitter Cat Book. 1947
