= Licking Heights Local School District =

School district in Ohio

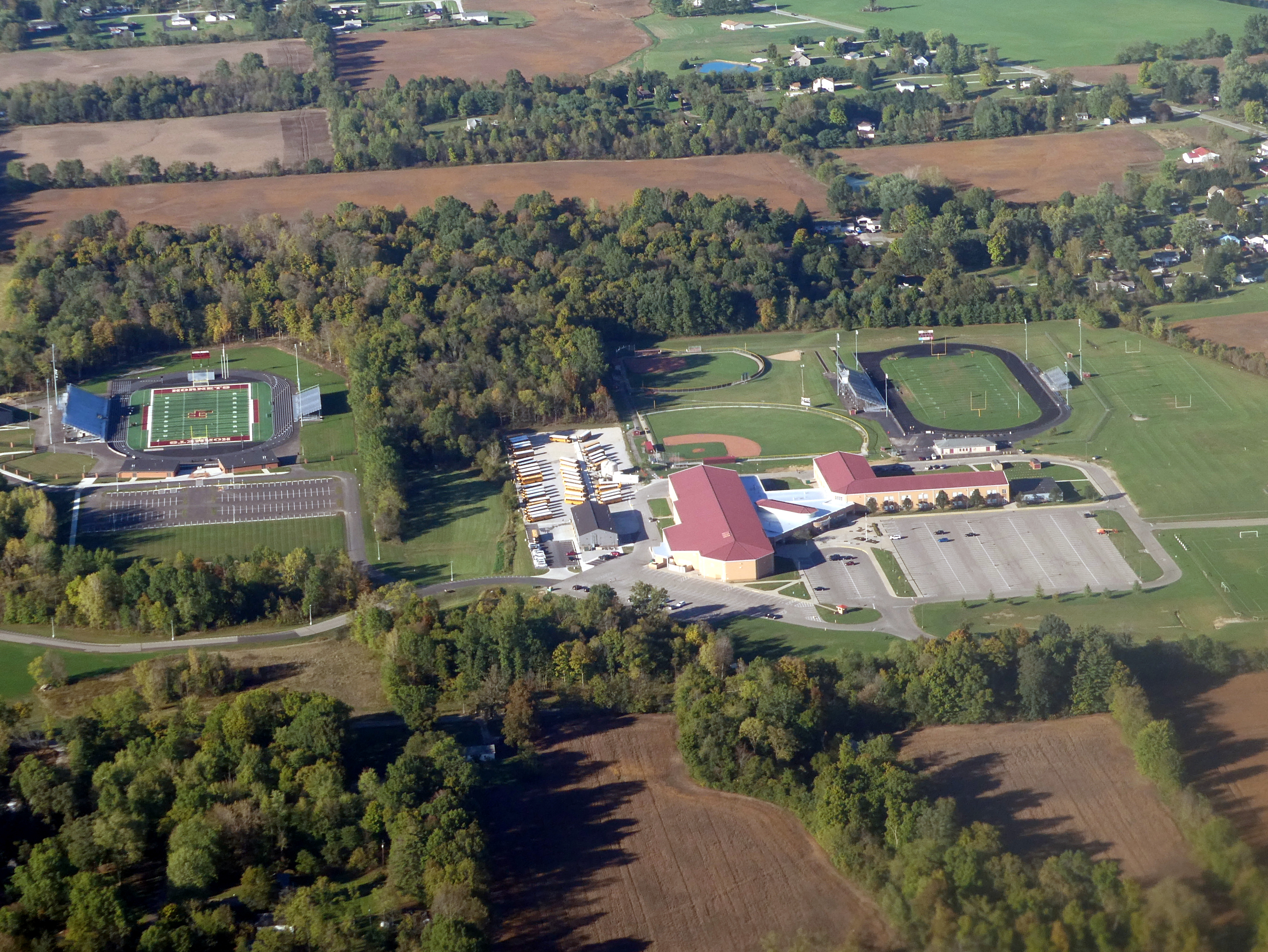
- Aerial view of Licking Heights Middle School

Address
- 6539 Summit Road Pataskala, Licking County, Ohio, 43062; United States
- Coordinates: 40°1′45″N 82°44′14″W

District information
- Type: Public, Coeducational
- Motto: Honoring our legacy. Inspiring the present. Ready for the future.
- Grades: K thru. 12
- Superintendent: Kevin Miller
- Accreditation: North Central Association of Colleges and Schools

Students and staff
- Students: 5,000+
- Athletic conference: Licking County League
- Colors: Maroon and Gold

Other information
- Website: www.lhschools.org

The Licking Heights Local School District is a local Ohio public school district straddling Franklin and Licking counties.

== Governance ==
The school district is governed by a five-member school board, elected in two classes by block voting. The current members of this board are:

- Tracy Russ, president
- Hannington Tsikiwa, vice president
- Mark Rader
- Paul Johnson

Licking Heights is under the Ohio Department of Education. It is a member of LACA, which provides services such as an online grade book and a mentor-ship program for high school students.

== Schools ==
- Licking Heights High School
- Licking Heights Middle School
- Licking Heights Summit Station (formerly known as Central Intermediate)
- Licking Heights Lima Ridge Elementary (newest elementary building in the district)
- Licking Heights Broad Peak Elementary (formerly known as South Elementary)
- Licking Heights Everest Elementary (formerly known as West Elementary)
- Licking Heights Pathfinders Preschool (formerly known as North Elementary)
