= Bethel Baptist Church (Pataskala, Ohio) =

Historic church in Ohio, United States

- U.S. National Register of Historic Places
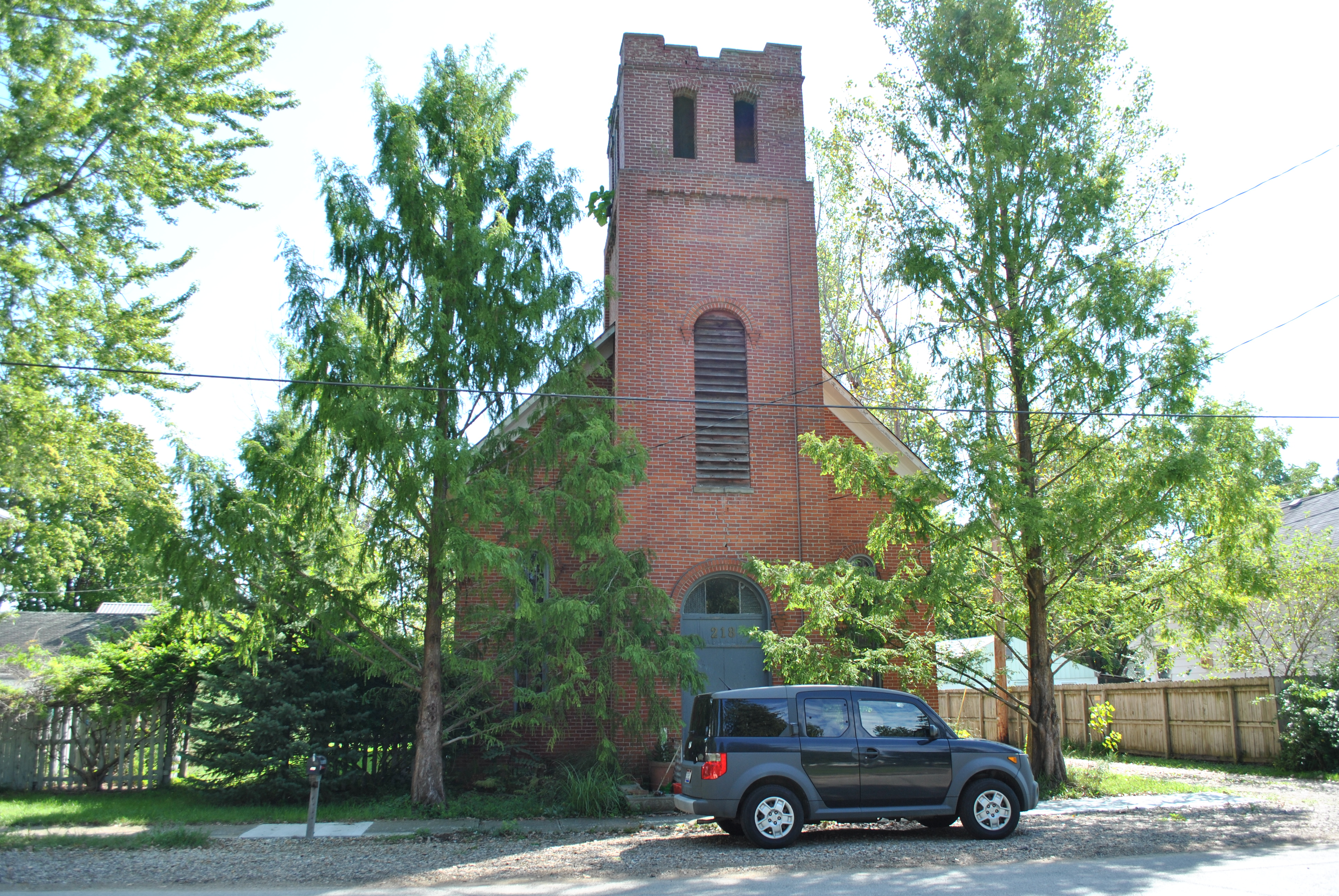

- Location within Ohio Location within the United States
- Location: Vine and North Sts., Pataskala, Ohio
- Coordinates: 39°59′53″N 82°40′40″W
- Area: less than one acre
- Built: 1855
- Architectural style: Romanesque Revival
- MPS: Pataskala MRA
- NRHP reference No.: 83001990
- Added to NRHP: September 22, 1983

Bethel Baptist Church was a historic church in Pataskala, Ohio but is now a private residence. It was built in 1855 in the early Romanesque Revival style. Although it is no longer used as a church, it is the oldest church building in the city of Pataskala, and was added to the National Register in 1983.
