= Pataskala Jail =

Historic jail

- U.S. National Register of Historic Places
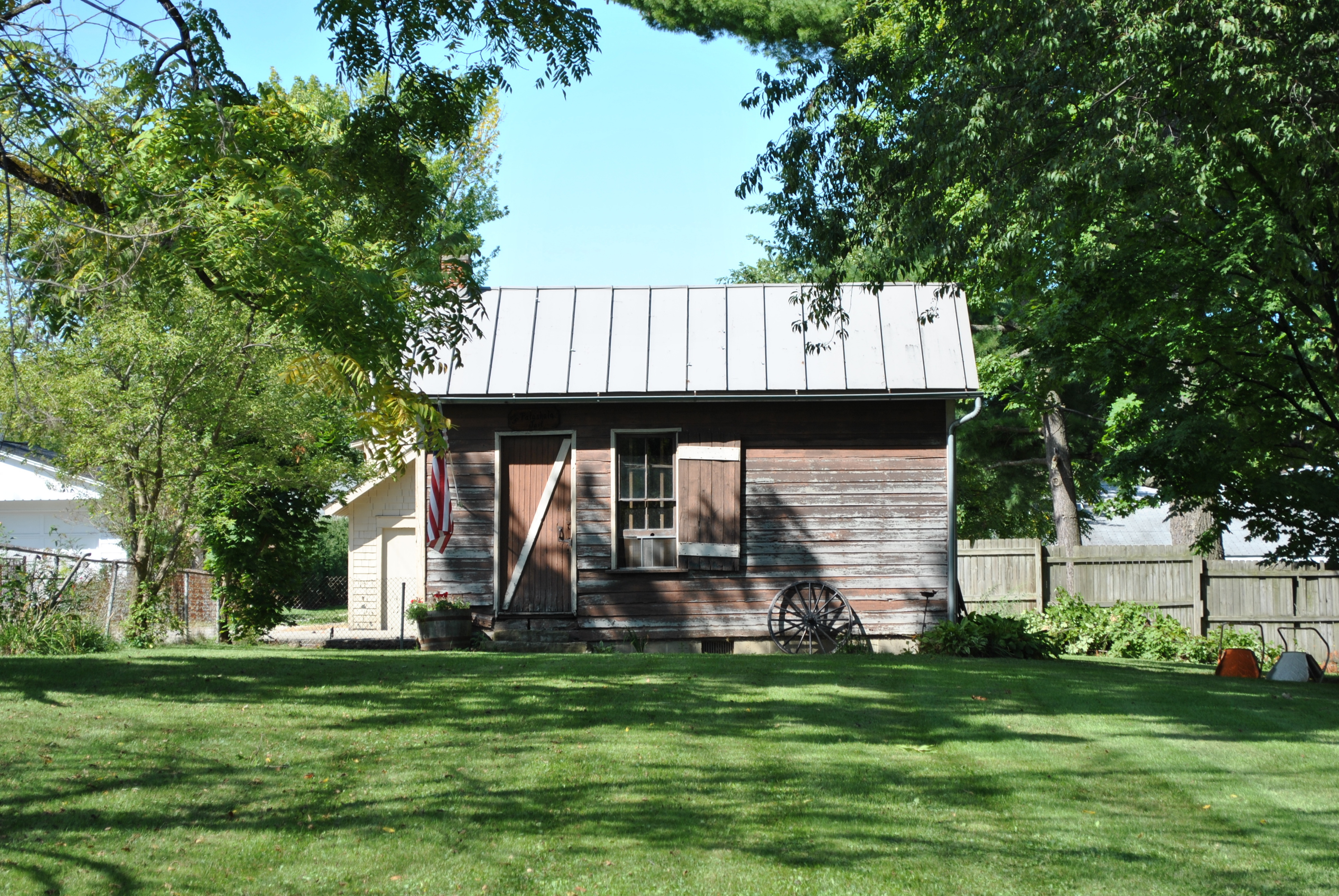
- Pataskala Jail

- Location within Ohio
- Location: Main St., Pataskala, Ohio
- Coordinates: 39.99888°N 82.67544°W
- Area: less than one acre
- Built: 1892
- MPS: Pataskala MRA
- NRHP reference No.: 83001997
- Added to NRHP: September 22, 1983

The Pataskala Jail, off Main Street in Pataskala, Ohio, was constructed in 1892 by the village of Pataskala as its first jail. The structure was originally located at the corner of Front and Poplar Streets, “on the north side of Front Street, halfway between Main Street and Township Road.” The jail was disestablished in 1916. In 1978 the structure was moved to its current location on South Main Street. The Pataskala Jail was added to the National Register of Historic Places on September 22, 1983.

It was listed on the National Register as a follow-on to a 1980 study of historic resources in Pataskala.

== Architecture ==
The jail is considered a vernacular structure. Constructed by a local builder, the one-story, 12- by 20-foot building is made of two-by-fours laid flat on top of each other, rather than on edge, to make the walls thicker. The boards were then "spiked together, using spikes long enough to go through three of these 2 by 4s." Horizontal siding covers the exterior. Its gabled roof was originally rolled asphalt. Today, the structure has a steel roof, aluminum gutters, and chimney.

The interior is divided into two cells and an anterior room. The anterior room has a window and stove. Each cell has a wooden bunk and one barred window with shutters. The bars are on the outside of the cell windows, but on the inside of the anterior room, and "are made of flat steel instead of round."

== History of use ==
Few people were ever sent to the Pataskala Jail. In correspondence to historian Carolyn Bentz, longtime Pataskala resident Clint Baird noted that “only six Pataskala citizens were ever jailed there.” They include one woman, four teenaged boys who raided a strawberry patch, and an adult male.

According to news reports, Donald Moreland was held on March 30, 1911, “In the little jail at Pataskala” on murder charges before he was transferred to the Licking County Jail in Newark, Ohio.

On June 18, 1894, the Newark Advocate reported that Terry Grimm and Joe Thrapp broke into the Baltimore & Ohio Railroad ticket office at Pataskala at 3:00 am. The two men were caught in the act of breaking into the Depot’s safe. Thrapp escaped, but was shot, while Grimm “was at once jailed in the village.”

Most frequently, the jail was used by transients riding the rails. Pataskala was a common stop for the "many coal-burning freight trains that stopped here [in Pataskala] to get water, the water tank being located just east of town at the creek." With a coal-burning stove and wooden cots in the cells, the jail offered shelter, heat, and a place to cook food. At one point, the jail caught fire, and a hole in the ceiling above the stove still remains.

== Closure ==
The Pataskala Jail was decommissioned in 1916, upon completion of the Pataskala Town Hall. Because the town hall included an interior jail as part of its design, the old Pataskala Jail was no longer needed. After its decommission, the structure was used to store grain.

== Relocation ==
In 1978, "to prevent its destruction," the decommissioned jail was relocated to its current location at a private residence on South Main Street. The structure was loaded onto a trailer and driven to its new location. A man was positioned on the jail's roof during the relocation to raise up the electrical lines with a pole, to keep them intact as the building passed underneath. The jail is visible from Main St., and it is nearly adjacent to an alley which goes by the property.
