= Pataskala, Ohio =

- City
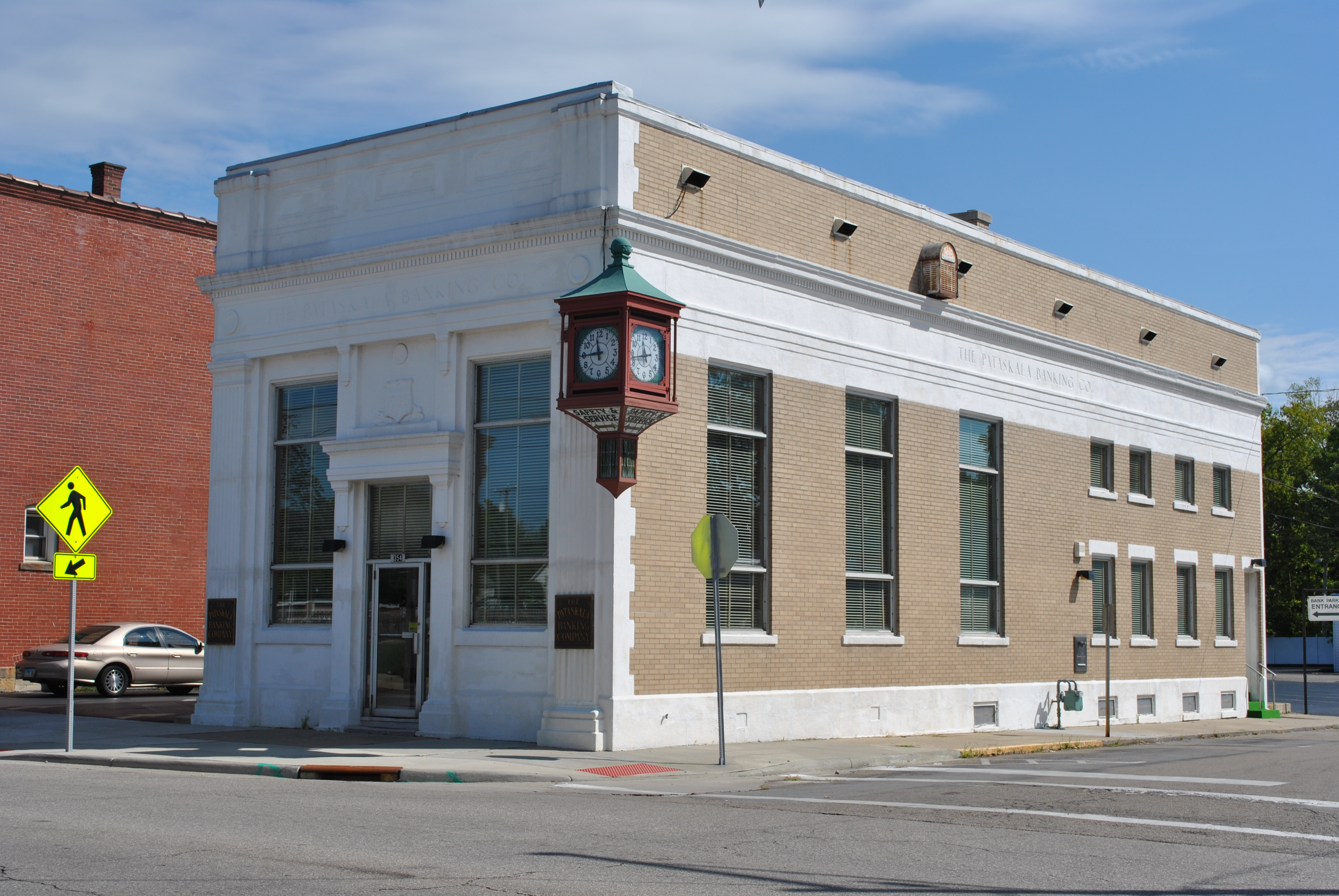
- Banking company in Pataskala

- Seal

- Location of Pataskala in Licking County

- Location within Ohio Location within the United States
- Coordinates: 39°59′52″N 82°42′56″W
- Country: United States
- State: Ohio
- County: Licking

Area
  - Total: 29.06 sq mi (75.26 km^{2})
  - Land: 28.96 sq mi (75.01 km^{2})
  - Water: 0.097 sq mi (0.25 km^{2})
- Elevation: 1,027 ft (313 m)

Population (2020)
  - Total: 17,886
  - Density: 617.6/sq mi (238.45/km^{2})
- Time zone: UTC-5 (Eastern (EST))
  - Summer (DST): UTC-4 (EDT)
- ZIP code: 43062
- Area codes: 740, 614
- FIPS code: 39-61112
- GNIS feature ID: 1086476
- Website: City website

Pataskala (/pəˈtæskələ/ pə-TAS-kə-lə) is a city in Licking County, Ohio, United States, approximately 19 miles (31 km) east of Columbus. The population was 17,886 at the 2020 census. Pataskala was a small community until 1996, when what was then the village of Pataskala merged with Lima Township, vastly increasing its population and geographic area.

== History ==
Pataskala was laid out in 1851 when the railroad was extended to that point. "Pataskala" is a name derived from the Delaware language. A post office has been in operation at Pataskala since 1852.

Pataskala was originally called Conine Town, after an early settler of the area, Richard Conine, and his wife Sarah (Van Dorn) Conine. Born in New Jersey, the Conines purchased over 2000 acres in Lima Township, permanently settling in the area in 1821. Conine had sold most of his land by 1850, and in 1851 he laid out plots for Conine Town. Another early settler, Jess Stoneman Green, who had purchased much of Conine's property, likewise laid out and sold lots in 1852. The name was changed to Pataskala in 1852.

== Geography ==
Pataskala is located along the South Fork of the Licking River in southwestern Licking County. Pataskala is the home of two school districts, Southwest Licking Local Schools and Licking Heights Local Schools. The Licking Heights district also serves parts of Reynoldsburg, Jefferson Township, and the census designated place of Blacklick.

According to the United States Census Bureau, Pataskala has a total area of 28.72 square miles (74.38 km^{2}), of which 28.62 square miles (74.13 km^{2}) are land and 0.10 square miles (0.26 km^{2}) are water.

== Education ==
=== Primary and secondary schools ===
The Southwest Licking Local School District has one high school (Watkins Memorial High School), one middle school (Watkins middle school), one intermediate school (Watkins Intermediate School) and three elementary schools (Etna, Kirkersville, Pataskala).

Licking Heights Local School District has one high school, one middle school, one intermediate school, and two elementary schools.

Private schools in the area are Liberty Christian Academy.

=== Post-secondary education ===
Central Ohio Technical College has a branch located within the city.

== Culture and recreation ==
=== Public libraries ===
The Pataskala Public Library serves the area. The current building was dedicated in 1969 at a cost of $119,314.54. The library has over 12,000 cardholders. The library has over 70,000 items, with annual circulation topping 250,000.

=== Parks and recreation ===
Pataskala features 127 acres (0.51 km^{2}) of parkland spread across 7 parks with wooded natural areas and river frontage. Multiple parks are located alongside the South Fork of the Licking River. The parks are spread across the city and feature athletic fields at many of the parks.

The Thomas J. Evans Foundation Park is the largest park in the city at 78 acres (0.32 km^{2}), 22 of which are wooded. A 1.4 mile (2.2 km) trail runs throughout the park.

Municipal Park is a 15-acre (61,000 m^{2}) park boasting the city's pool (leased to the Pataskala Recreation Association), athletic fields, and wooded areas.

=== Golf courses ===
Pataskala has 2 golf courses within its boundaries: Broadview Golf Course and Willow Run Golf Course Inc. There are an additional 47 golf courses within 20 miles (32 km) of Pataskala, including Cumberland Trail Golf Club, which borders Pataskala to the south in Etna Township.

== Demographics ==
Historical population
Census	Pop.	Note	%±
1870	462		—
1880	634		37.2%
1890	568		−10.4%
1900	675		18.8%
1910	800		18.5%
1920	771		−3.6%
1930	787		2.1%
1940	824		4.7%
1950	928		12.6%
1960	1,046		12.7%
1970	1,831		75.0%
1980	2,284		24.7%
1990	3,046		33.4%
2000	10,249		236.5%
2010	14,962		46.0%
2020	17,886		19.5%

=== 2020 census ===
As of the 2020 census, Pataskala had a population of 17,886. The median age was 38.3 years. 25.2% of residents were under the age of 18 and 15.6% of residents were 65 years of age or older. For every 100 females there were 94.9 males, and for every 100 females age 18 and over there were 90.9 males age 18 and over.

84.0% of residents lived in urban areas, while 16.0% lived in rural areas.

There were 6,554 households in Pataskala, of which 35.7% had children under the age of 18 living in them. Of all households, 54.8% were married-couple households, 14.3% were households with a male householder and no spouse or partner present, and 23.5% were households with a female householder and no spouse or partner present. About 22.5% of all households were made up of individuals and 10.2% had someone living alone who was 65 years of age or older.

There were 6,852 housing units, of which 4.3% were vacant. The homeowner vacancy rate was 1.0% and the rental vacancy rate was 4.6%.

Racial composition as of the 2020 census
Race	Number	Percent
White	13,912	77.8%
Black or African American	1,323	7.4%
American Indian and Alaska Native	73	0.4%
Asian	1,255	7.0%
Native Hawaiian and Other Pacific Islander	5	0.0%
Some other race	264	1.5%
Two or more races	1,054	5.9%
Hispanic or Latino (of any race)	595	3.3%

=== 2010 census ===
As of the census of 2010, there were 14,962 people, 5,588 households, and 4,132 families living in the city. The population density was 522.8 inhabitants per square mile (201.9/km^{2}). There were 5,960 housing units at an average density of 208.2 per square mile (80.4/km^{2}). The racial makeup of the city was 90.0% White, 6.0% African American, 0.3% Native American, 0.7% Asian, 0.6% from other races, and 2.5% from two or more races. Hispanic or Latino of any race were 2.0% of the population.

There were 5,588 households, of which 39.9% had children under the age of 18 living with them, 56.3% were married couples living together, 12.7% had a female householder with no husband present, 4.9% had a male householder with no wife present, and 26.1% were non-families. 20.6% of all households were made up of individuals, and 6.5% had someone living alone who was 65 years of age or older. The average household size was 2.66 and the average family size was 3.07.

The median age in the city was 35.8 years. 27.6% of residents were under the age of 18; 6.8% were between the ages of 18 and 24; 29.9% were from 25 to 44; 25.2% were from 45 to 64; and 10.6% were 65 years of age or older. The gender makeup of the city was 49.1% male and 50.9% female.

=== 2000 census ===
As of the census of 2000, there were 10,249 people, 3,922 households, and 2,914 families living in the city. The population density was 359.5 inhabitants per square mile (138.8/km^{2}). There were 4,132 housing units at an average density of 144.9 per square mile (55.9/km^{2}). The racial makeup of the city was 94.6% White, 3.0% African American, 0.3% Native American, 0.5% Asian, <0.1% Pacific Islander, 0.6% from other races, and 1.0% from two or more races. Hispanic or Latino of any race were 1.0% of the population.

There were 3,922 households, out of which 38.1% had children under the age of 18 living with them, 59.9% were married couples living together, 10.7% had a female householder with no husband present, and 25.7% were non-families. 20.9% of all households were made up of individuals, and 7.8% had someone living alone who was 65 years of age or older. The average household size was 2.59 and the average family size was 3.00.

In the city, the population was spread out, with 27.8% under the age of 18, 7.1% from 18 to 24, 32.8% from 25 to 44, 22.7% from 45 to 64, and 9.5% who were 65 years of age or older. The median age was 34 years. For every 100 females, there were 95.7 males. For every 100 females age 18 and over, there were 92.7 males.

The median income for a household in the city was $51,684, and the median income for a family was $58,021. Males had a median income of $39,322 versus $30,628 for females. The per capita income for the city was $23,099. About 5.0% of families and 5.4% of the population were below the poverty line, including 4.5% of those under age 18 and 9.2% of those age 65 or over.

== National Register of Historic Places listings ==
Eleven buildings in Pataskala are listed on the National Register of Historic Places, selected by the U.S. Department of Interior in 1983.

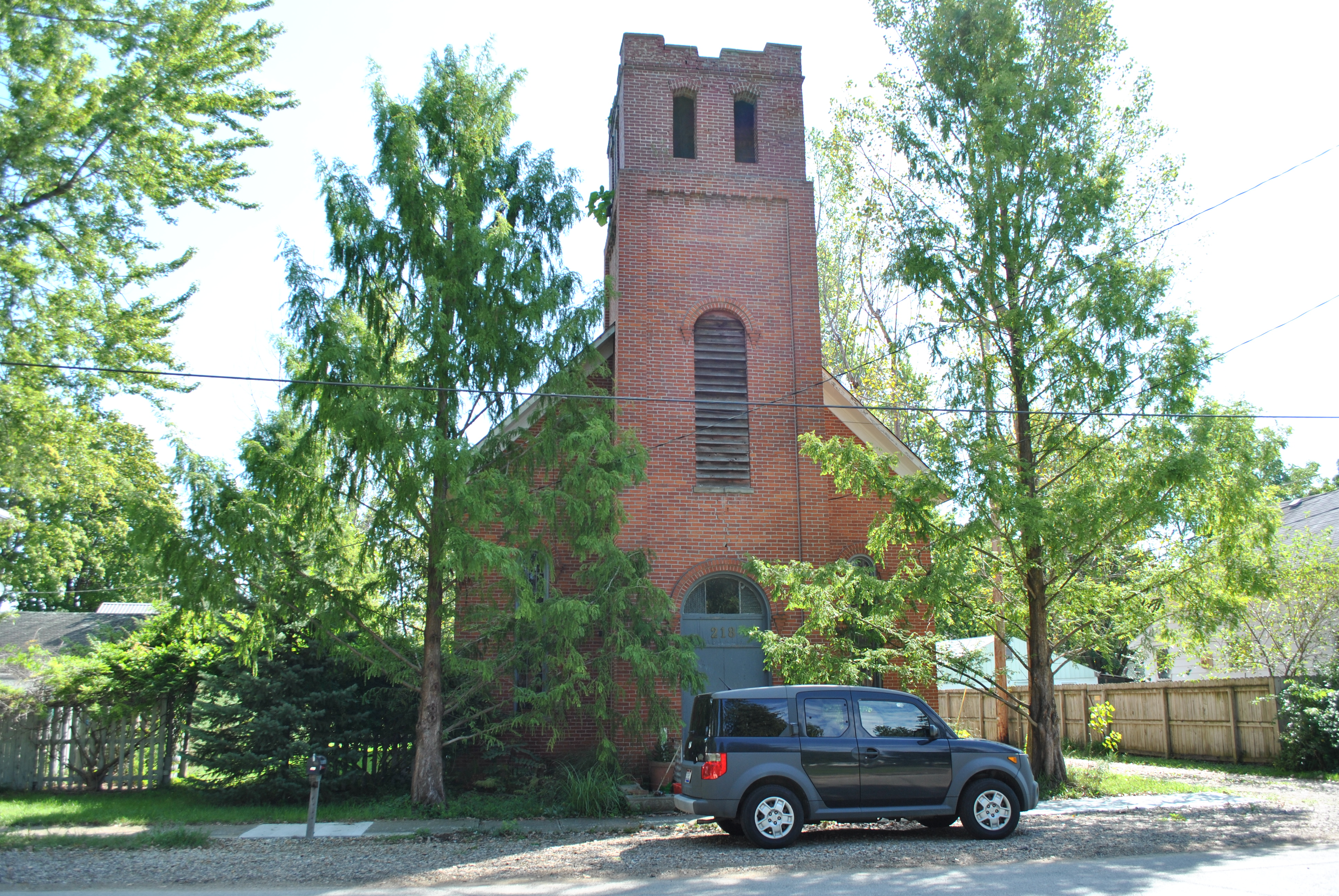
Bethel Baptist Church (#83001990)

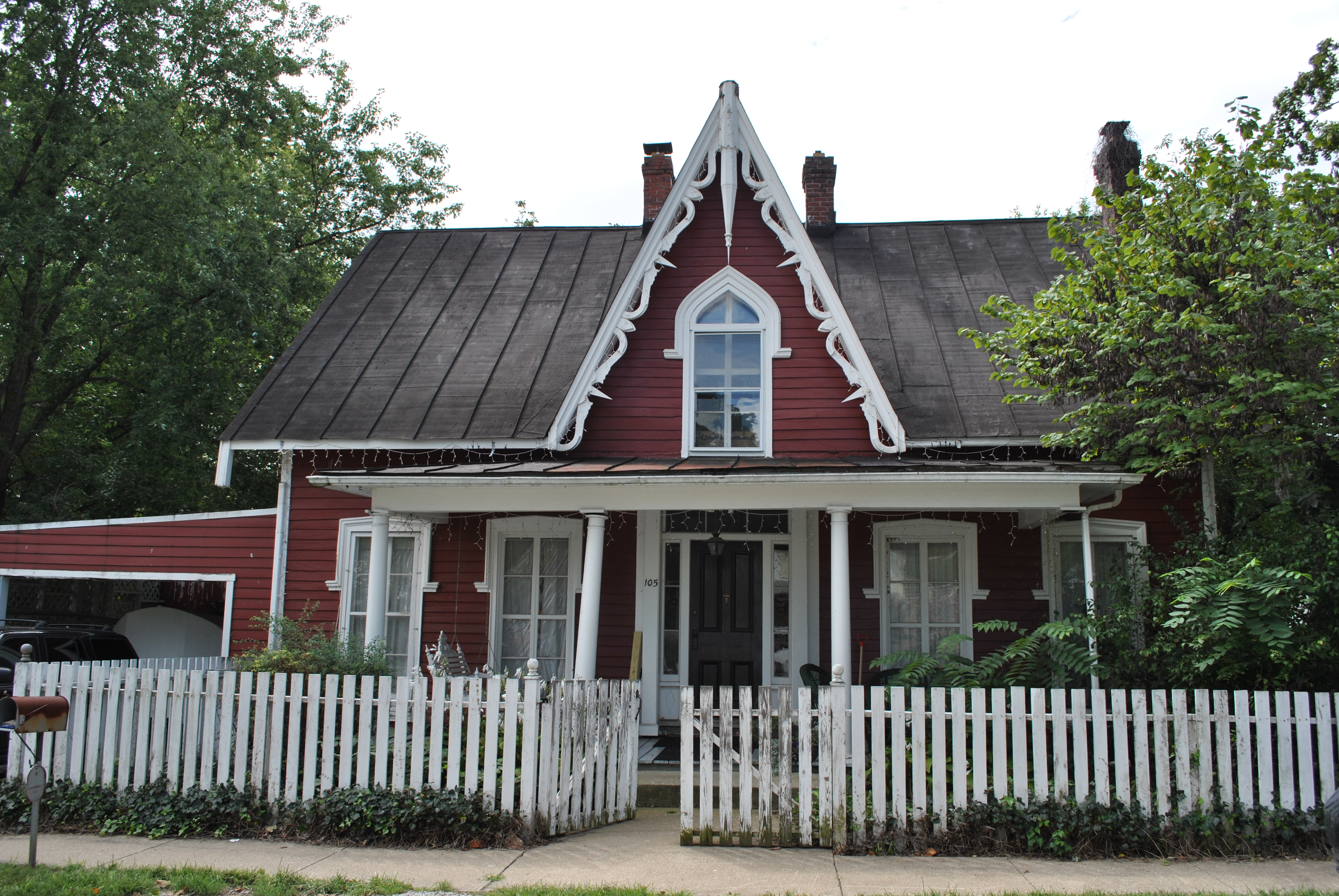
Casterton House (#83001992)

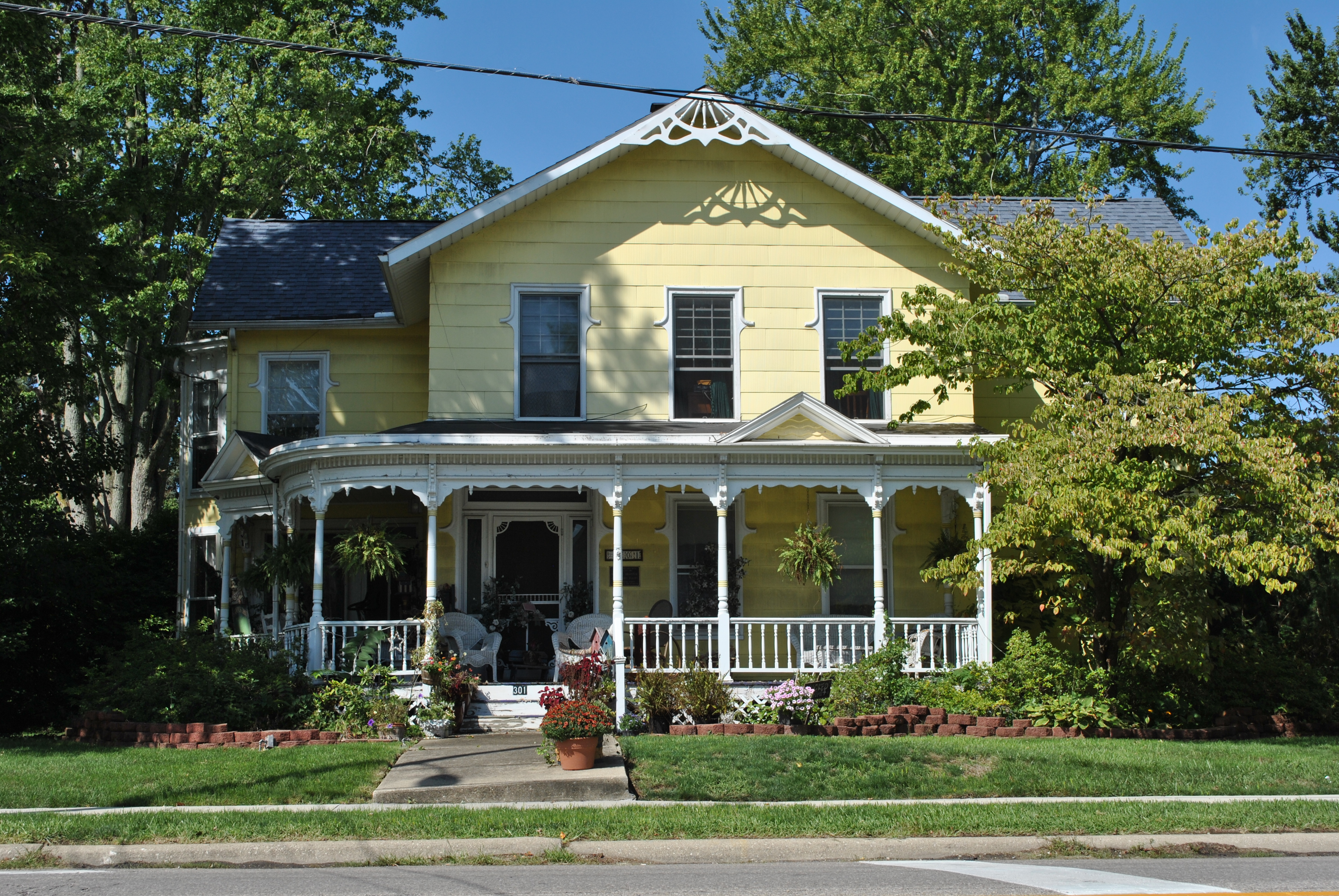
Elliot House (#83004315)

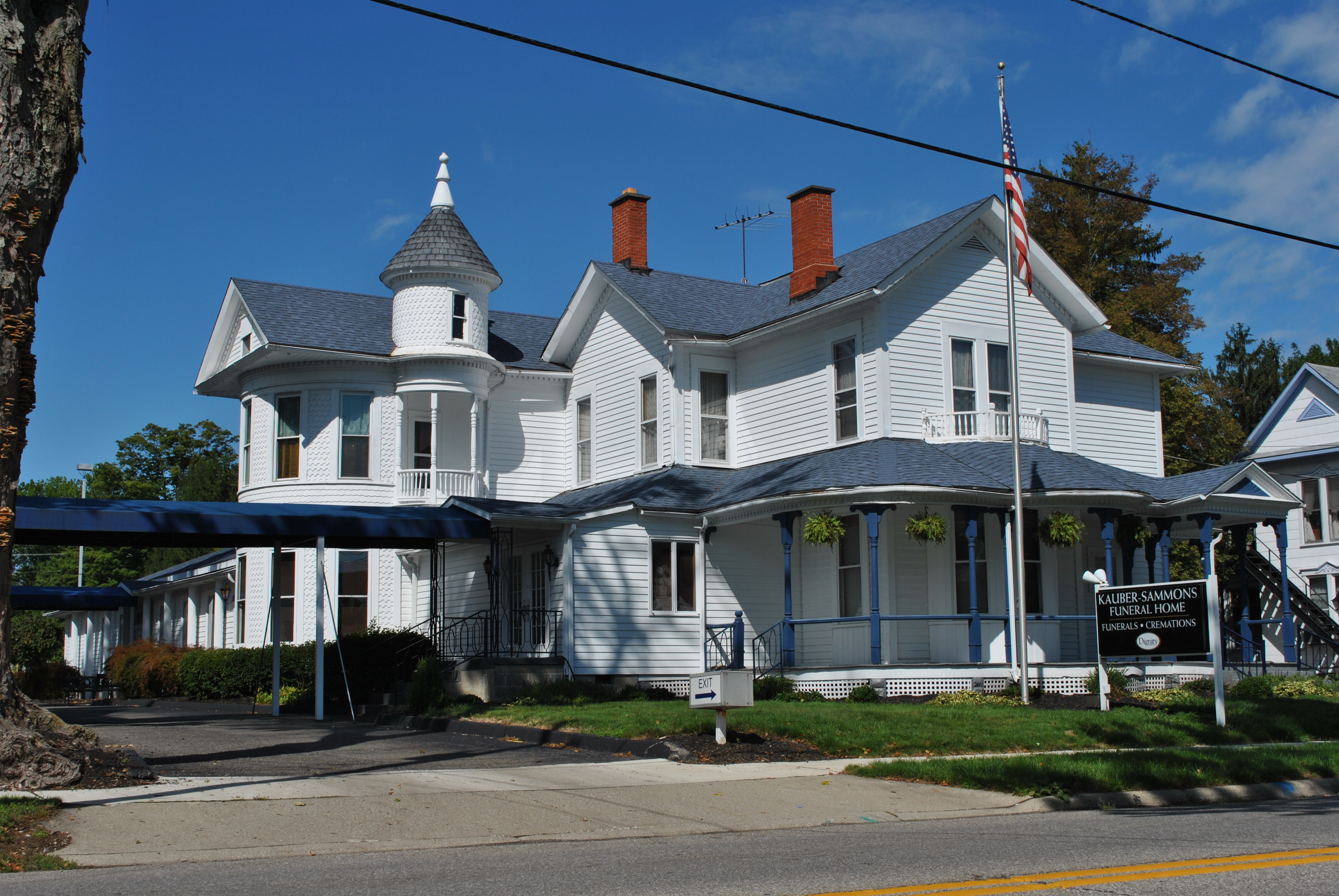
Warren F. Kauber Funeral Home (#83001993)

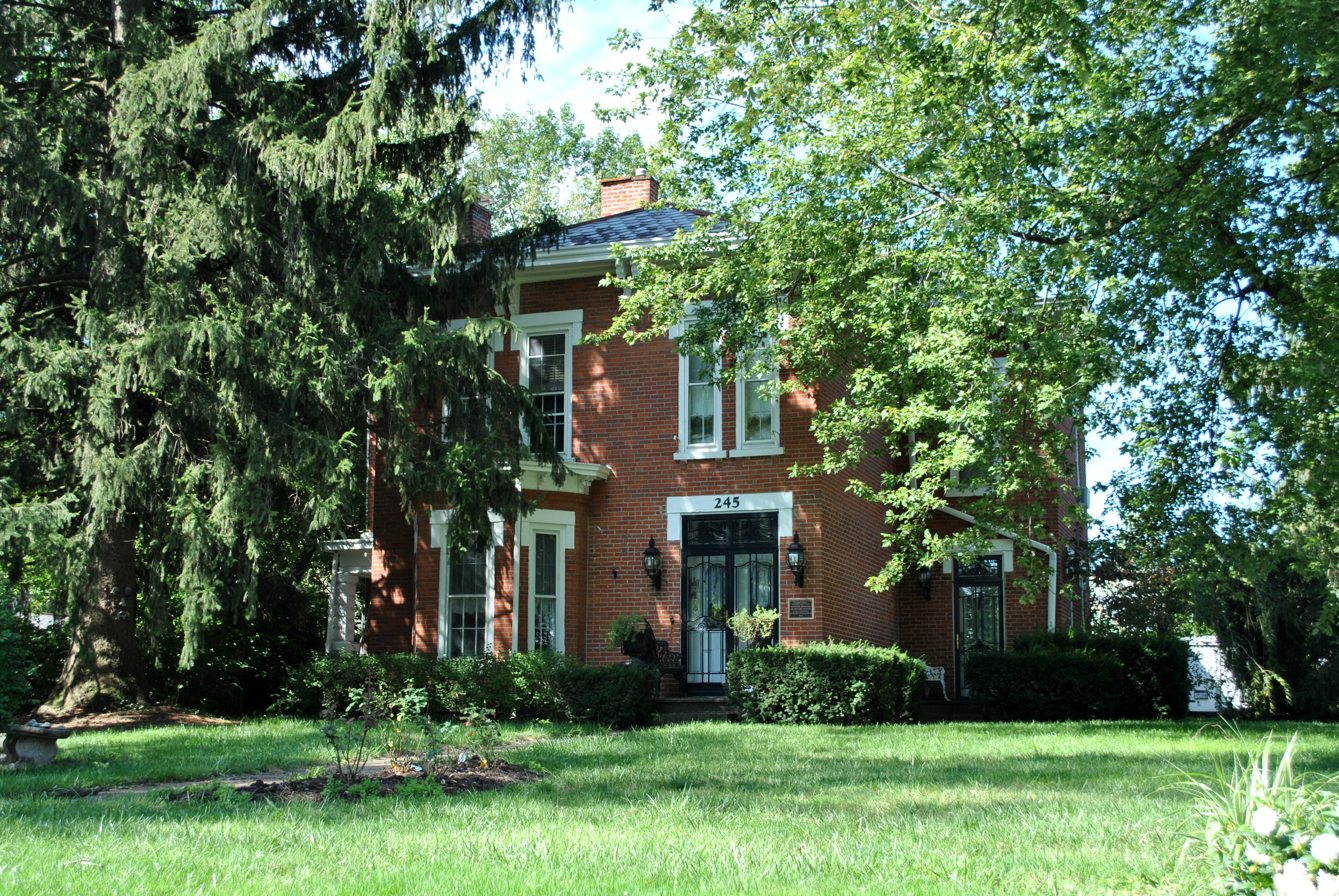
Mead House (#83001994)

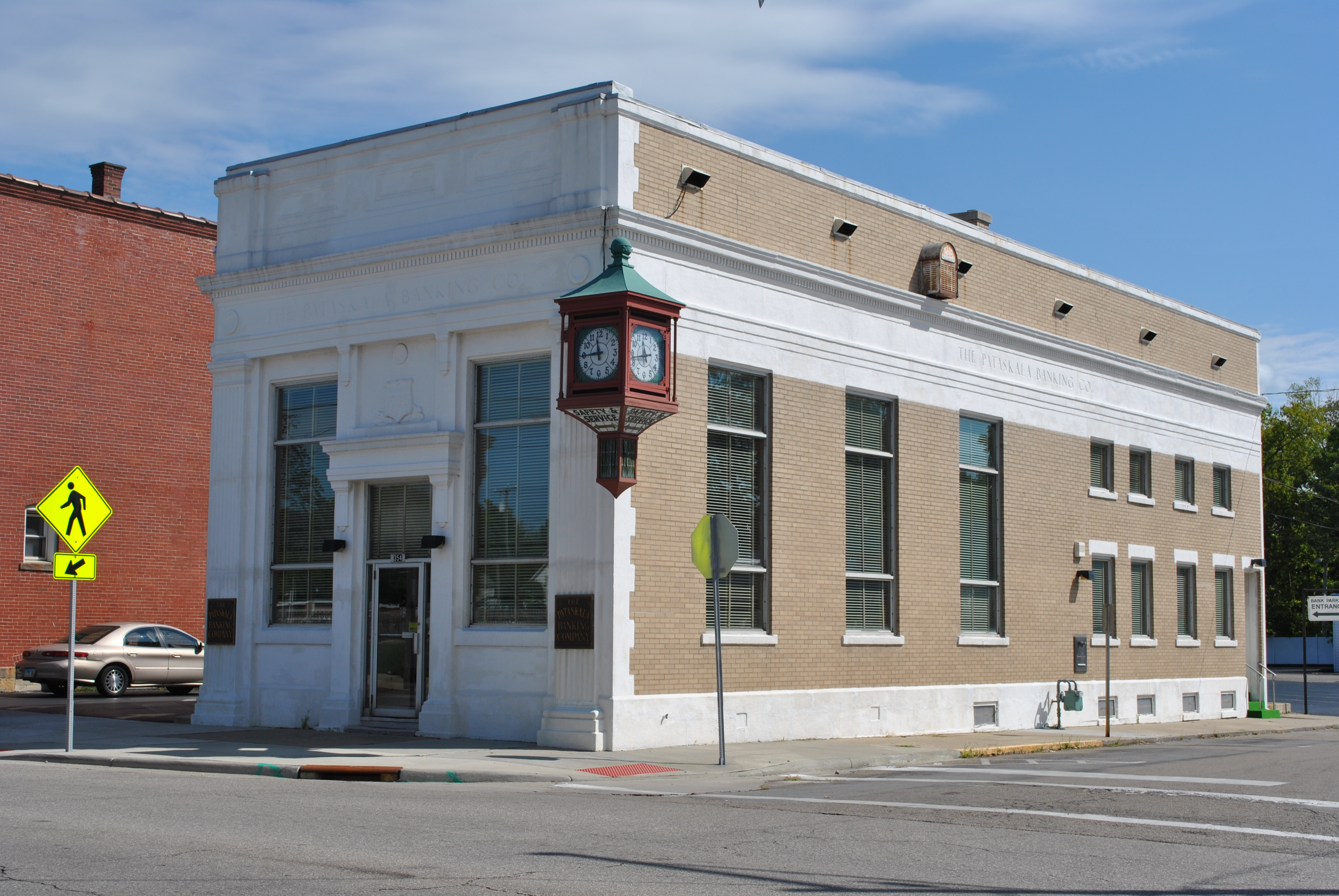
Pataskala Banking Company (#83001996)

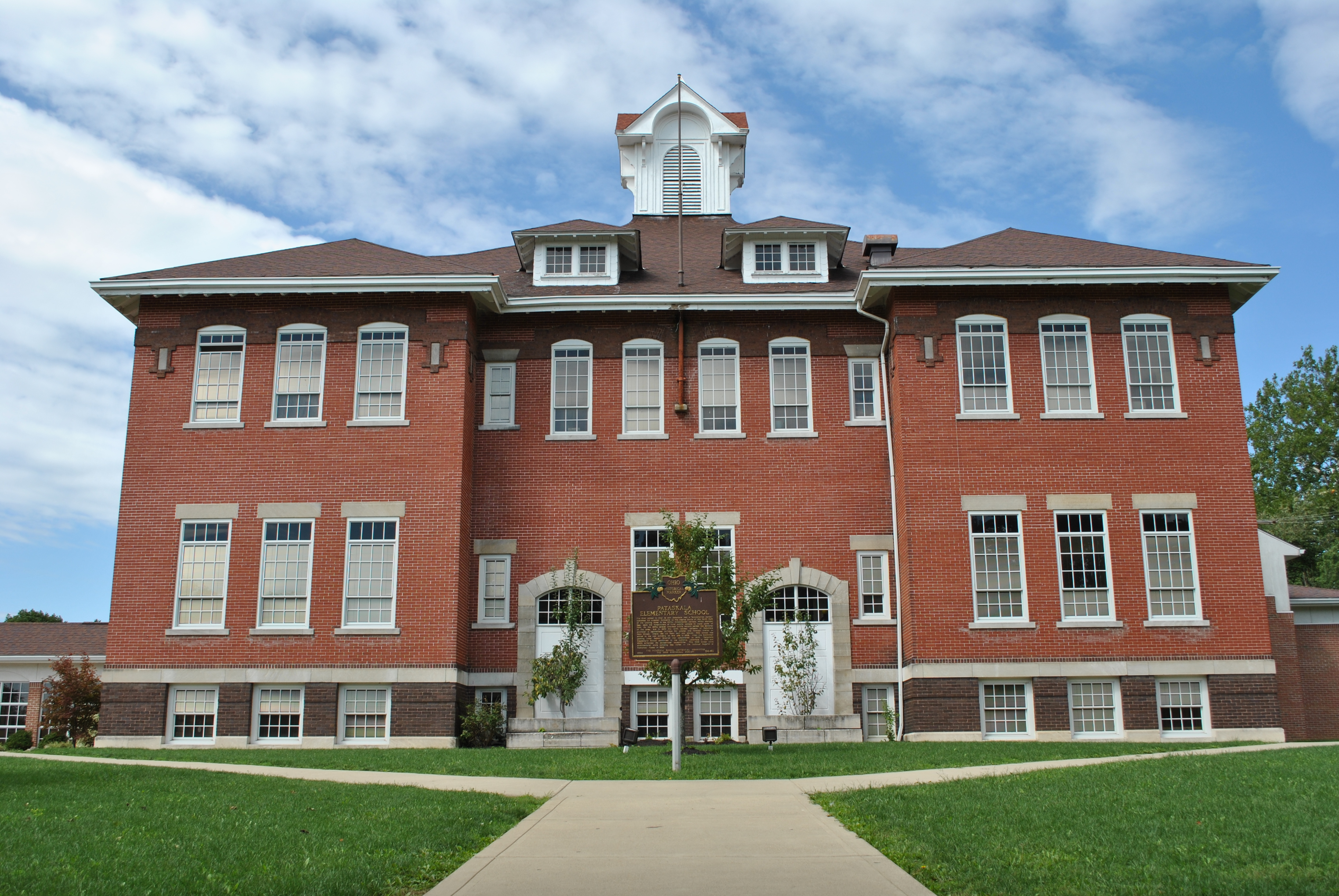
Pataskala Elementary School (#83001995)

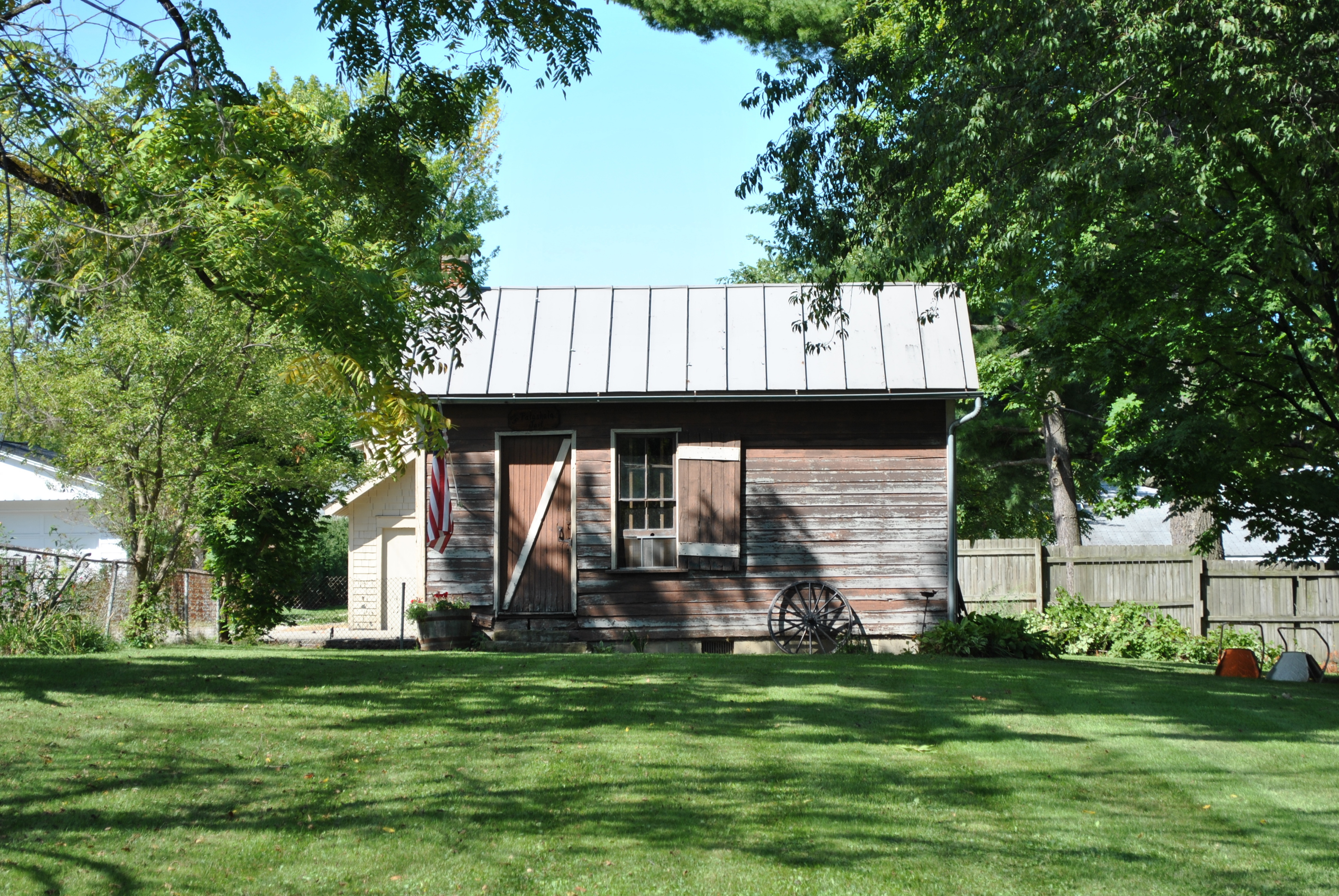
Pataskala Jail (#83001997)

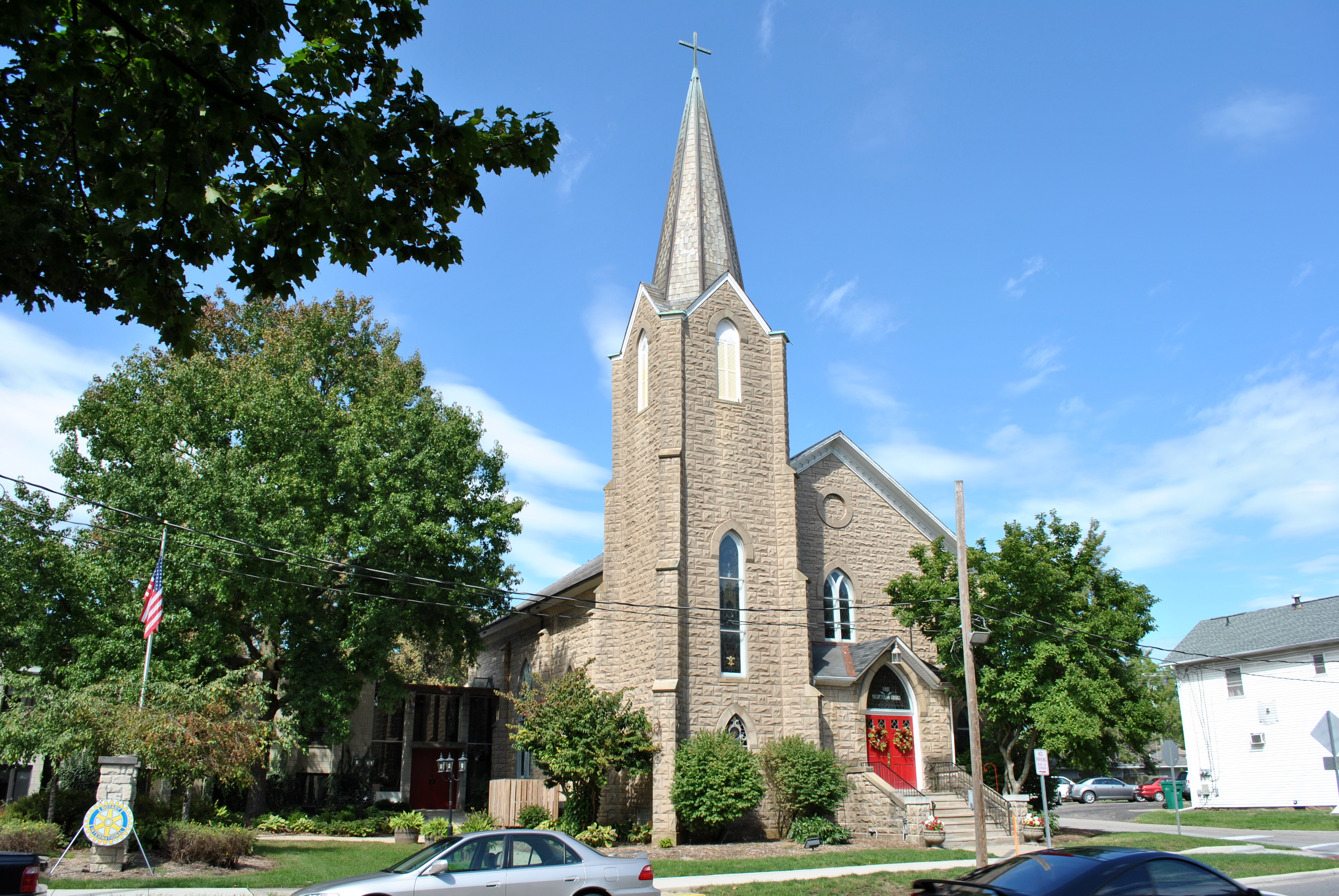
Pataskala Presbyterian Church (#83004323)

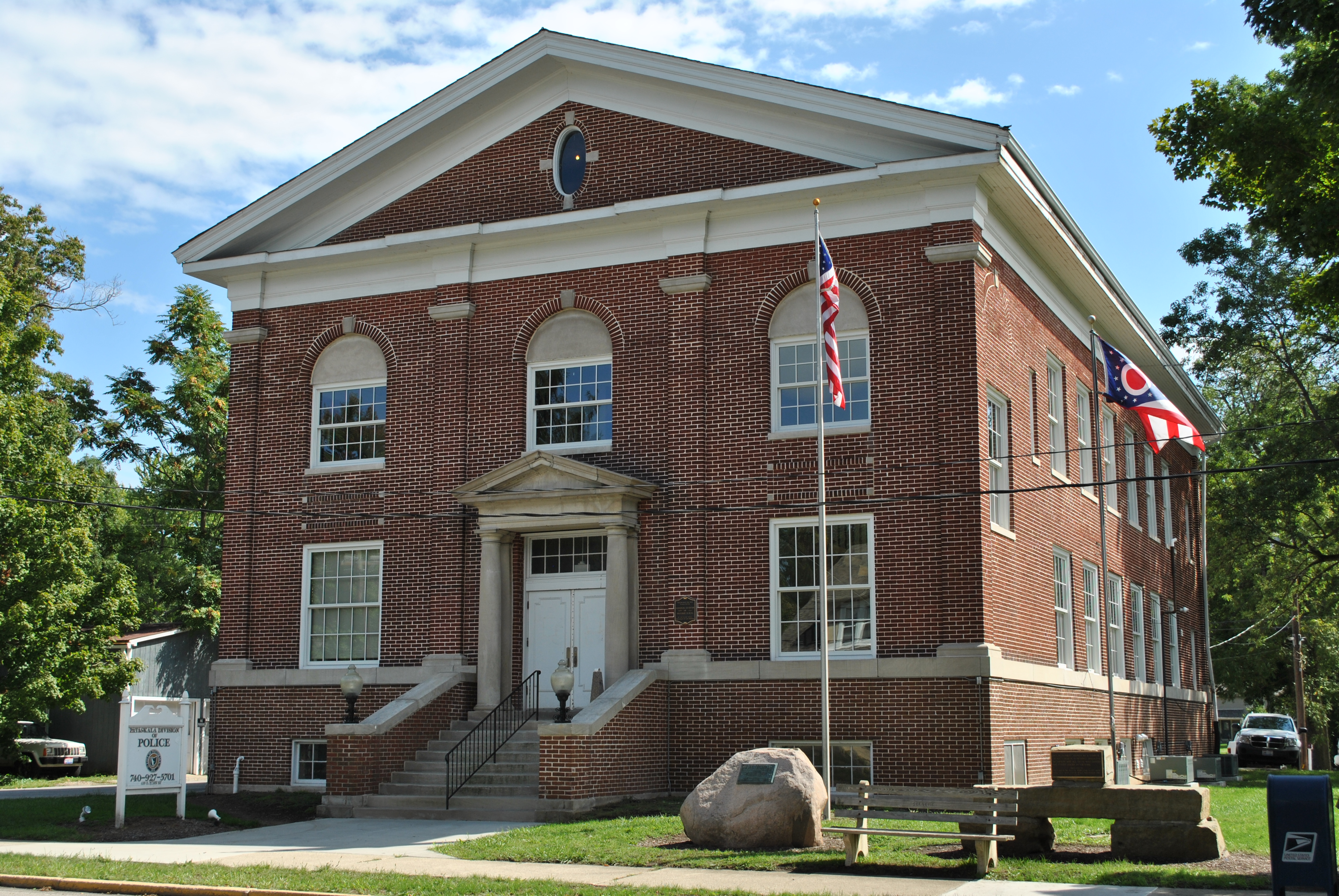
Old Pataskala Town Hall (#83001998)

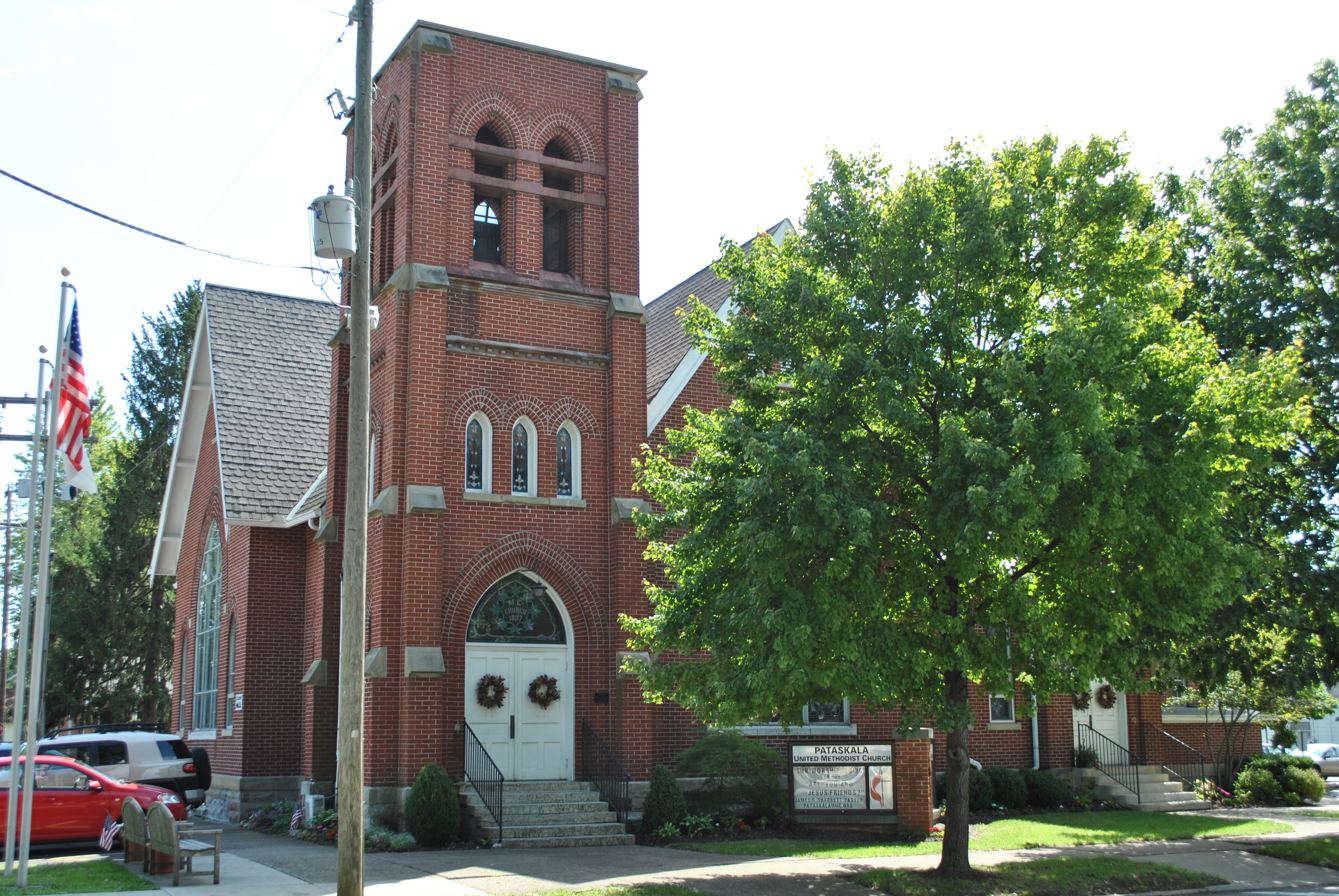
Pataskala United Methodist Church (#83001999)

== Notable people ==
- Jeaniene Frost, New York Times-bestselling author
- John Holmes, better known as Johnny Wadd, porn star
- John Reuben, Christian rap artist and raised here
- Robert Smith, professional ten-pin bowler
- Chalmers Wylie, thirteen-term congressman
- Eleanor Youmans, children's author, winner of an Ohioana Award for juvenile fiction in 1945
