= Pataskala United Methodist Church =

Historic church in Ohio, United States

- U.S. National Register of Historic Places
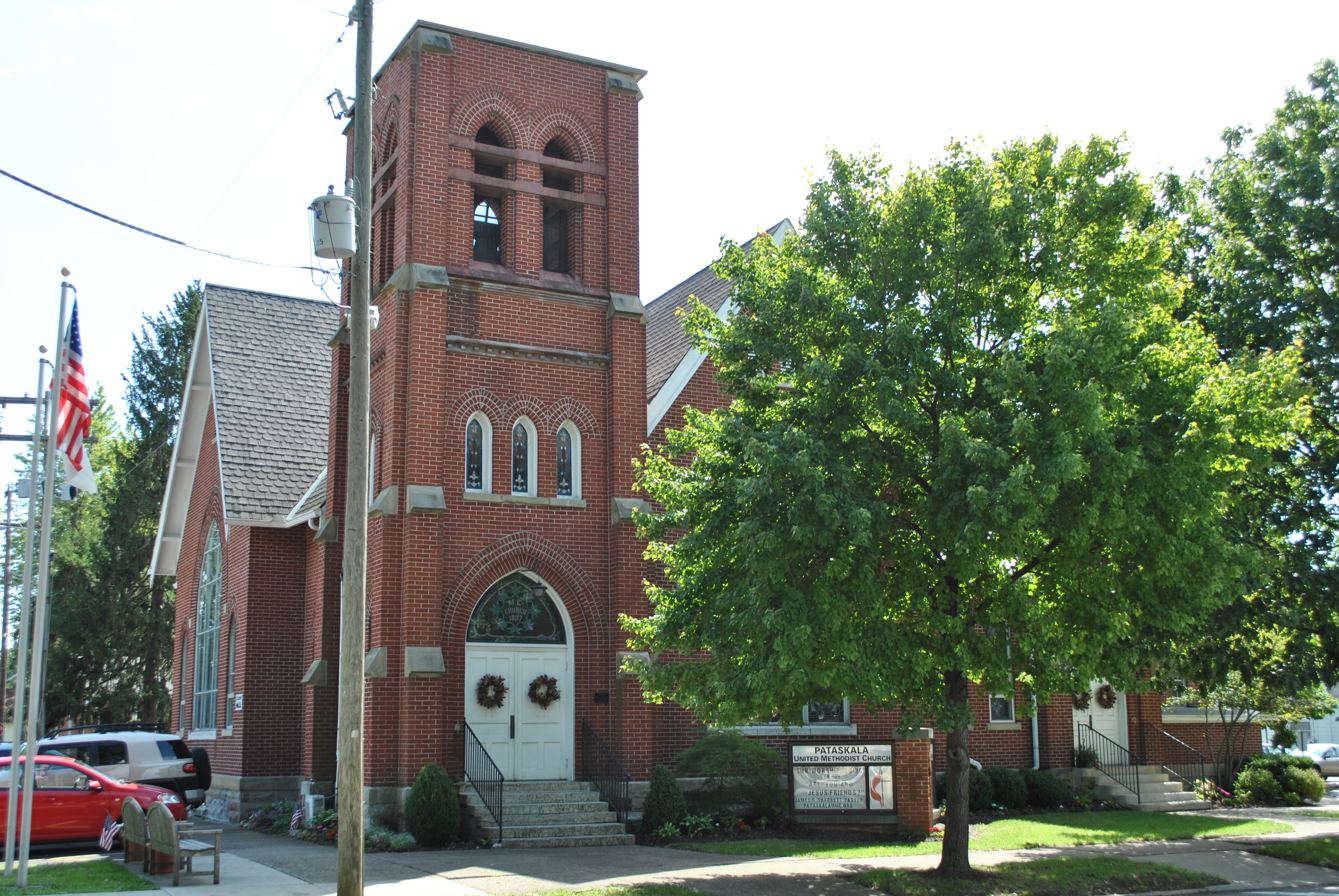

- Location within Ohio Location within the United States
- Location: 458 S. Main St., Pataskala, Ohio
- Coordinates: 39°59′17″N 83°1′35″W
- Area: less than one acre
- Built: 1897
- Built by: Henry Brooke & William Condit
- Architectural style: Gothic Revival
- MPS: Pataskala MRA
- NRHP reference No.: 83001999
- Added to NRHP: September 22, 1983

Pataskala United Methodist Church is a historic church building at 458 S. Main Street in Pataskala, Ohio.

Circuit riders established the first regular services of the Pataskala United Methodist Church in 1853. Meetings were held in a schoolhouse located where the present Pataskala Town Hall now stands.

William H. Mead II raised funds to construct the current brick structure in 1896–1897. The church building was designed by Henry Brookes. Brookes and William Condit "hand hewed the rafters and siding," while the pulpit was hand carved by Julia Brookes. The bell was hung in 1897.

Remodels to the building since its initial construction include the addition of a basement in 1910 that was later enlarged in 1928, the installation of a pipe organ in 1928, "the remodeling of the choir loft and chancel area in 1964," and an education wing and social hall addition in 1971. In 1927, L. R. Moore designed and painted the portrait of Christ in the sanctuary.

The building has elements of Gothic Revival styling. It was added to the National Register of Historic Places in 1983.

Its history and significance was described in 1979 as:

Pataskala United Methodist Church is significant to the religious history of the community. Architecturally the church is an example of late 19th Century Eccleastical style often found in small towns and rural areas. Architectural elements include the Gothic Revival inspired squat buttressed bell tower and pointed arched stain glass windows and the Stick style exposed truss in gable over the side entrance. Methodism came to Lima Township and Pataskala in 1853. One of the three most prominent religions established in Pataskala, the United Methodist congregation was comprised in part by local business leaders.

It was listed on the National Register as a follow-on to a 1980 study of historic resources in Pataskala.
