= Ohio State Route 374 =

State highway in Hocking County, Ohio, US

State Route 374

Route information
- Maintained by ODOT
- Length: 25.26 mi (40.65 km)
- Existed: 1932–present

Major junctions
- South end: SR 56 near South Bloomingville
- North end: US 33 near Rockbridge

Location
- Country: United States
- State: Ohio
- Counties: Hocking

Highway system
- Ohio State Highway System; Interstate; US; State; Scenic
← SR 373	→ SR 375

State Route 374 (SR 374) is north–south state highway in Hocking County, Ohio, located in the southern portion of the state. Its southern terminus is over 4 miles (6.4 km) east of the unincorporated village of South Bloomingville at State Route 56, and its northern terminus is near the unincorporated village of Rockbridge at US 33, west of Logan. The road serves Hocking State Forest as well as Hocking Hills State Park, and the entire highway is part of the designated Hocking Hills Scenic Byway.

== History ==
In 1932, an unnumbered gravel road was included into the state highway system between Mound Crossing at SR 180 (now the southernmost intersection on SR 374 with SR 180) and the road that is now SR 664 in rural Hocking County. By 1934, the route had been numbered SR 374. In 1938, SR 374 was extended at both ends by taking over what was SR 664 between SR 56 and Cedar Grove at the south end and was routed along SR 180 between Mound Crossing and what was then SR 678, and then along SR 678 to Rockbridge at the intersection of US 33. A slight realignment occurred in the area of the Old Man's Caves within Hocking Hills State Park (along the section concurrent with SR 664) between 2011 and 2013. The realignment was needed to reduce the conflict between traffic on the road and pedestrians in the vicinity of the park. The one-mile-long (1.6 km) realignment opened by January 2013.

== Major intersections ==
The entire route is in Hocking County.

Location	mi	km	Destinations	Notes
Benton Township	0.00	0.00	SR 56	
Benton Township	3.74	6.02	SR 664 north – Logan	Southern end of SR 664 concurrency
Benton Township	6.11	9.83	SR 664 south – South Bloomingville	Northern end of SR 664 concurrency
Laurel Township	10.51	16.91	SR 678 north – Gibisonville	Southern terminus of SR 678
Perry Township	13.25	21.32	SR 180 west – Laurelville	Southern end of SR 180 concurrency
Laurel Township	17.87	28.76	SR 180 east – Logan	Northern end of SR 180 concurrency
Good Hope Township	25.26	40.65	US 33 – Logan, Lancaster	
1.000 mi = 1.609 km; 1.000 km = 0.621 mi: Concurrency terminus
