= Ohio State Route 678 =

State highway in Hocking County, Ohio, US

State Route 678

Route information
- Maintained by ODOT
- Length: 4.00 mi (6.44 km)
- Existed: 1937–present

Major junctions
- South end: SR 374 near Gibisonville
- North end: SR 180 near Gibisonville

Location
- Country: United States
- State: Ohio
- Counties: Hocking

Highway system
- Ohio State Highway System; Interstate; US; State; Scenic
← SR 677	→ I-680

State Route 678 (SR 678) is a short four-mile-long (6.4 km) north–south state highway located in southeast Ohio. Entirely situated within Laurel Township in Hocking County, SR 678 has its southern terminus at SR 374 approximately one and a half miles (2.4 km) southwest of the hamlet of Gibisonville, and its northern terminus is at SR 180 nearly two and a half miles (4.0 km) northeast of Gibisonville. SR 678 provides a shorter alternative for traffic using SR 374 en route from Hocking Hills State Park up to U.S. Route 33 (US 33) at Rockbridge, in conjunction with SR 180.

== Route description ==
State Route 678 begins at a T-intersection with SR 374 in Hocking County's Laurel Township. Starting out, the highway weaves its way in a northerly and easterly fashion, passing primarily through a forested landscape, with spaces of open grass and the occasional home also appearing alongside the highway. Turning to the east, SR 678 passes through the small hamlet of Gibisonville, where the highway is lined by a number of homes and a church. This town is also where SR 678 intersects Cream Ridge Road. Departing Gibsonville, the state route turns to the east-northeast, intersects Dunlap Road, then bends to the northeast. At Mount Olive Road, SR 678 turns back to the east-northeast, passing a succession of homes and through more open space, before curving to the north at the Hocking County Road 9 intersection. From here, SR 678 weaves through heavy woods, bending back to the northeast into an area of open space, prior to turning back to the north one final time before arriving at its terminal intersection at SR 180.

No portion of SR 678 is included within the National Highway System.

== History ==
SR 678 was designated in 1937. Originally, the highway was shown on the official state highway map as traveling along its current alignment between SR 374] and SR 180, then traveling along SR 180 west a short distance, and following what is now SR 374 from SR 180 to US 33 near Rockbridge. By 1938, however, SR 678 was shown in the form that it currently exists as today, with the remaining portions of what was identified as SR 678 on the prior year's map becoming a solo stretch of SR 180 and an extension of SR 374, respectively.

== Major intersections ==
The entire route is in Laurel Township, Hocking County.

mi	km	Destinations	Notes
0.00	0.00	SR 374 to SR 56 – Laurelville	
4.00	6.44	SR 180	
1.000 mi = 1.609 km; 1.000 km = 0.621 mi
