= Ohio State Route 180 =

State highway in southern Ohio, US

State Route 180

Route information
- Maintained by ODOT
- Length: 29.55 mi (47.56 km)
- Existed: 1927–present

Major junctions
- West end: SR 159 near Chillicothe
- East end: US 33 / CR 33A near Logan

Location
- Country: United States
- State: Ohio
- Counties: Ross, Pickaway, Hocking

Highway system
- Ohio State Highway System; Interstate; US; State; Scenic
← SR 179	→ SR 181

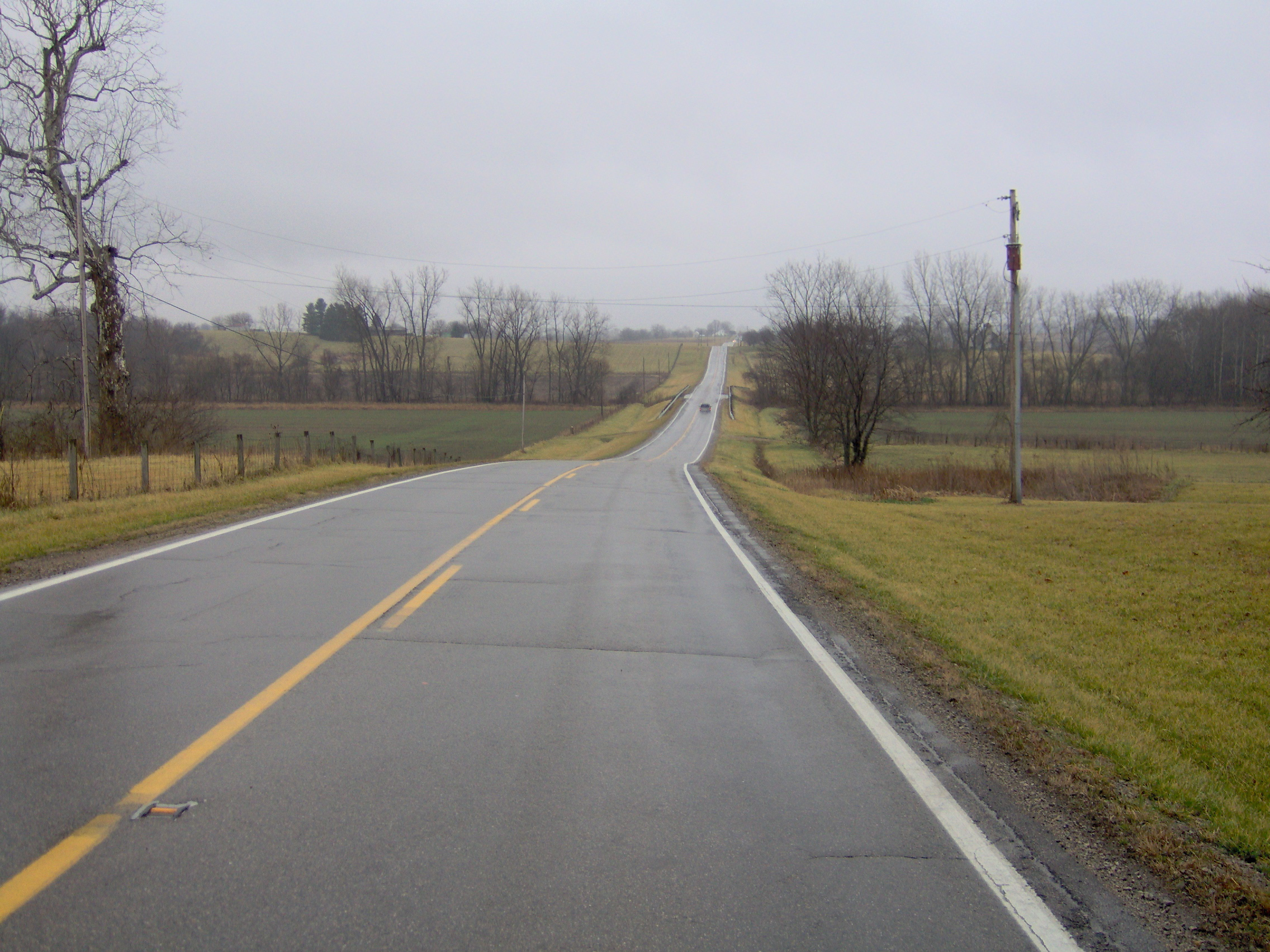
View along State Route 180 northeast of Chillicothe

State Route 180 (SR 180) is a 29.55-mile (47.56 km) long east–west state highway in the southern portion of the U.S. state of Ohio. SR 180 has its western terminus at a Roundabout with SR 159 nearly 5 miles (8.0 km) northeast of Chillicothe. Its eastern terminus is at a diamond interchange with the U.S. Route 33 (US 33) expressway approximately 3.75 miles (6.04 km) northwest of Logan.

== Route description ==
Along its path, SR 180 travels through northeastern Ross County, the extreme southeastern corner of Pickaway County and the northwestern part of Hocking County. No portion of this highway is included within the National Highway System (NHS). The NHS is a network of routes determined to be most important for the economy, mobility and defense of the nation.

== History ==
The SR 180 designation was applied in 1927. Prior to this time, the stretch of highway that SR 180 currently occupies through Ross, Pickaway and Hocking Counties was designated as SR 27. With the designation of the US 27 in that year, SR 27 was replaced by SR 180. The only change related to SR 180 since its inception has been the highway that it meets at its eastern terminus, which at the time was the predecessor to US 33, SR 31.

Construction began in October 2019 on SR 180 western terminus with SR 159. The project redesigns the intersection with a roundabout. Originally, an extension of SR 207 was supposed to meet up, but due to the discovery of a wetland in the environmental study, SR 207 would not intersect with SR 180. Construction was completed the following October.

== Major intersections ==
County	Location	mi	km	Destinations	Notes
Ross	Green Township	0.00	0.00	SR 159 – Chillicothe	Roundabout
Ross	Adelphi	11.79	18.97	SR 327 south (Concord Street) / Main Street – Tar Hollow State Forest	Northern terminus of SR 327
Pickaway	Salt Creek Township	12.44	20.02	SR 56 west – Circleville	Western end of SR 56 concurrency
Hocking	Laurelville	13.09	21.07	SR 56 east (Pike Street) / Water Street	Eastern end of SR 56 concurrency
Hocking	Perry Township	20.39	32.81	SR 374 south	Western end of SR 374 concurrency
Hocking	Laurel Township	25.01	40.25	SR 374 north	Eastern end of SR 374 concurrency
Hocking	Laurel Township	25.51	41.05	SR 678 south – Gibisonville	Northern terminus of SR 678
Hocking	Falls Township	29.55	47.56	US 33 / CR 33A – Athens, Columbus	Interchange
1.000 mi = 1.609 km; 1.000 km = 0.621 mi: Concurrency terminus
