= Ohio State Route 328 =

State highway in southeastern Ohio, US

State Route 328

Route information
- Maintained by ODOT
- Length: 22.73 mi (36.58 km)
- Existed: 1932–present

Major junctions
- South end: SR 93 near McArthur
- North end: US 33 in Logan

Location
- Country: United States
- State: Ohio
- Counties: Vinton, Hocking

Highway system
- Ohio State Highway System; Interstate; US; State; Scenic
| ← SR 327 | → SR 329 |

State Route 328 (SR 328) is a north–south state highway in the southeastern quadrant of the U.S. state of Ohio. The southern terminus of SR 328 is at SR 93 approximately 2.75 miles (4.43 km) north of McArthur. Its northern terminus is at a diamond interchange with U.S. Route 33 (US 33) in the extreme southeastern portion of Logan, immediately northeast of where it crosses over the Hocking River.

== Route description ==
SR 328 traverses northeastern Vinton County and southeastern Hocking County.

== History ==
The designation of SR 328 took place in 1932. Originally, the highway was a spur route that ran from Front Street, the former two-lane routing of US 33 that was designated as SR 31 at the time, in Logan, and followed the combination of Lockheed Road and the present alignment of SR 328 southeast to the unincorporated community of Union Furnace.

In 1937, SR 328 was extended southwest from Union Furnace to its present southern terminus, utilizing a combination of previously un-numbered roadways and a portion of SR 56 where it crosses from Hocking County into Vinton County. Then, by 1971, the highway was shortened slightly on the north end with the completion of the US 33 four-lane divided freeway around the south side of Logan. Jurisdiction of this short stretch between the new freeway and Front Street was transferred from the State to local control, with the road becoming known as Lockheed Road.

In 2014, the Ohio House of Representatives designated SR 328 within Hocking County the Patrolman Carl "Shorty" Thrush Memorial Highway. Thrush, a patrolman for the Ohio State Highway Patrol, died in the line of duty from injuries he suffered in a motor vehicle accident in 1972. The designation took effect in 2015.

In 2016, ODOT proposed converting the intersection with the eastbound ramps of US 33 in Logan near Logan High School to a roundabout due to congestion. The roundabout opened to traffic in 2017.

== Major intersections ==
| County | Location | mi | km | Destinations | Notes |
|---|---|---|---|---|---|
| Vinton | Elk Township | 0.00 | 0.00 | SR 93 – McArthur, Logan | |
| Vinton | Brown Township | 10.29 | 16.56 | SR 56 west – Laurelville | Southern end of SR 56 concurrency |
| Hocking | Starr Township | 12.84 | 20.66 | SR 56 east – Athens | Northern end of SR 56 concurrency |
| Hocking | Logan | 22.73 | 36.58 | US 33 – Athens, Lancaster | Interchange |
1.000 mi = 1.609 km; 1.000 km = 0.621 mi: Concurrency terminus
