= Ohio State Route 312 =

State highway in southern Ohio, US

State Route 312

Route information
- Maintained by ODOT
- Length: 9.14 mi (14.71 km)
- Existed: 1932–present

Major junctions
- South end: SR 93 near Logan
- North end: SR 664 near Bremen

Location
- Country: United States
- State: Ohio
- Counties: Hocking, Perry, Fairfield

Highway system
- Ohio State Highway System; Interstate; US; State; Scenic
← SR 311	→ SR 313

State Route 312 (SR 312) is a north–south state highway located in the southern portion of the U.S. state of Ohio. SR 312 runs from its southern terminus at a T-intersection with SR 93 approximately 4.25 miles (6.84 km) northeast of Logan to its northern terminus at a T-intersection with SR 664 nearly 1.25 miles (2.01 km) south of Bremen.

SR 312 was created in the early 1930s. Its generally maintained its same routing for the entirety of its history, excepting the first five years of its existence when it continued north along SR 664 a short distance through Bremen before coming to an end at SR 37. This two-lane highway traverses rural territory for its entire length.

== Route description ==
Along its way, SR 312 traverses a very small portion of Hocking County, cuts across the southwesternmost part of Perry County and enters into the southeastern corner of Fairfield County.

SR 312 begins at a T-intersection with SR 93 in Hocking County's Falls Township at a location approximately 4.25 miles (6.84 km) northeast of Logan. The initial stretch of this state highway features it traveling to the northwest amidst a wooded landscape. After a distance of just 0.40 miles (0.64 km), the route departs Hocking County and passes into Perry County.

Now in Monday Creek Township, SR 312 continues to travel in a northwesterly direction through gently rolling hills, with forested land providing the predominant backdrop, but the occasional patch of open field appears along the way, along with a few houses. The highway passes Township Road 245 and travels a distance before passing through a reverse curve that takes it to the northeast before turning to the north-northwest. It next meets Griggs Road, then intersects Township Road 248 as it curves back to the north-northeast. SR 312 gradually starts arcing back to the northwest prior to meeting Township Road 430 at a split intersection, with the eastern leg meeting the state highway just prior to where the western leg meets it. After a short distance, SR 312 crosses Township Road 372, and passes into Jackson Township. The landscape becomes more open in this area in the immediate vicinity of the highway, with woods dwelling further in the background. Following a northwesterly trend as it passes through the southwestern part of the township, the state route meets Van Horn Road, and a short distance later, enters into Fairfield County.

As it enters Rush Creek Township, SR 312 travels to the northwest, continuing amidst primarily open fields with houses appearing along the way, and woods situated further back. The route bends to the west-northwest prior to the split intersection it has with Bethel Road, with the southern leg intersecting first, followed shortly thereafter by the northern leg. Next, SR 312 passes through a sharp reverse curve that takes the highway north and then back to the west as McCullough Road splits off to the north. After intersecting Fairview Road, the state highway turns to the northwest, then bends to the west-northwest before meeting Geneva School Road. Shortly after that point, SR 312 comes to an end as it arrives at the T-intersection it has with SR 664, which forms the southern and western legs of intersection as SR 312 enters from the east.

SR 312 is not included as a part of the National Highway System.

== History ==
The designation of SR 312 took place in 1932. The original path of SR 312 incorporated all of its current routing, along with the portion of SR 664 that runs between SR 312 and SR 37 just north of the village limits of Bremen. When SR 664 was introduced in 1937, SR 312's northern terminus was moved from SR 37 south to its current location, as the SR 664 designation replaced that of SR 312 from there through Bremen to the SR 37 intersection, and then continuing north of where SR 312 had formerly ended.

== Major intersections ==
County	Location	mi	km	Destinations	Notes
Hocking	Falls Township	0.00	0.00	SR 93 – New Straitsville, Logan	
Perry	No major junctions				
Fairfield	Rush Creek Township	9.14	14.71	SR 664	
1.000 mi = 1.609 km; 1.000 km = 0.621 mi
