= Ohio State Route 56 =

State highway in central Ohio, US

State Route 56

Route information
- Maintained by ODOT
- Length: 108.80 mi (175.10 km)
- Existed: 1923–present

Major junctions
- West end: SR 29 near Mutual
- I-70 near Summerford; US 40 in Summerford; US 42 / SR 38 / SR 142 / SR 665 in London; I-71 near Mount Sterling; US 62 / SR 3 / SR 207 in Mount Sterling; US 22 / US 23 in Circleville; SR 93 near Orland
- East end: SR 682 in Athens

Location
- Country: United States
- State: Ohio
- Counties: Champaign, Clark, Madison, Pickaway, Hocking, Vinton, Athens

Highway system
- Ohio State Highway System; Interstate; US; State; Scenic
← SR 55	→ SR 57

State Route 56 (SR 56) is an east–west state highway in central Ohio. Its western terminus is at SR 29 near Mutual and its eastern terminus is at SR 682 in Athens.

== Route description ==
SR 56 travels in a generally northwest–southeast direction in an arc around the southwestern side of Columbus. As of 2012, no part of SR 56 is included within the National Highway System.

== History ==
The route of SR 56 between Mutual and Laurelville has been included within the state highway system since 1912. In 1923, the many numbered routes were unified as SR 56 running along the route, it continues to run today. By 1926, the route was extended east from its end in Laurelville to Athens running along the same route it has currently.

== Major junctions ==
County	Location	mi	km	Destinations	Notes
Champaign	Union Township	0.00	0.00	SR 29 – Urbana, Mechanicsburg	
Champaign	Union Township	2.14	3.44	SR 4	
Clark	No major junctions				
Madison	Somerford Township	11.47	18.46	SR 187 north – Mechanicsburg	Southern terminus of SR 187
Madison	Somerford Township	12.39	19.94	I-70 – Dayton, Columbus	Exit 72 (I-70)
Madison	Somerford Township	13.20	21.24	US 40 (National Road) – Springfield, Columbus	
Madison	London	17.17	27.63	US 42 / SR 38 north / SR 665 begins (High Street) / SR 142 east	Western end of SR 38 / SR 665 concurrency; western terminus of SR 142
Madison	London	17.48	28.13	SR 38 south / SR 665 east (Center Street)	Eastern end of SR 38 / SR 665 concurrency
Madison	Pleasant Township	29.48	47.44	I-71 – Cincinnati, Columbus	Exit 84 (I-71)
Madison	Pleasant Township	32.14	51.72	SR 323 west	Eastern terminus of SR 323
Madison	Mount Sterling	32.92	52.98	US 62 west / SR 3 south (Main Street) / SR 207 begins	Western end of SR 207 concurrency
Madison	Mount Sterling	32.99	53.09	US 62 east / SR 3 north (Columbus Street) / SR 207 south	Eastern end of SR 207 concurrency
Pickaway	Monroe Township	38.65	62.20	SR 316 east / CR 21 (Five Points Pike) – Darbyville	Western terminus of SR 316
Pickaway	Jackson Township	49.22	79.21	SR 104 – Chillicothe, Columbus	
Pickaway	Wayne Township	51.20	82.40	US 22 west / CR 100 – Washington Court House	Western end of US 22 concurrency
Pickaway	Circleville	52.37	84.28	US 23 – Chillicothe, Columbus	Interchange
Pickaway	Circleville	52.76	84.91	SR 188 east (Court Street)	Western terminus of SR 188
Pickaway	Circleville	53.41	85.96	US 22 east (Lancaster Pike) / Mingo Street	Eastern end of US 22 concurrency
Pickaway	Salt Creek Township	60.28	97.01	SR 159 – Kingston, Tarlton	
Pickaway	Salt Creek Township	67.19	108.13	SR 180 west – Adelphi	Western end of SR 180 concurrency
Hocking	Laurelville	67.84	109.18	SR 180 east (Main Street) / Water Street	Eastern end of SR 180 concurrency
Hocking	Benton Township	77.23	124.29	SR 664 north – Logan	Southern terminus of SR 664
Hocking	Benton Township	81.39	130.98	SR 374 north	Southern terminus of SR 374
Vinton	Swan Township	85.95	138.32	SR 93 – Logan, McArthur	
Vinton	Brown Township	89.60	144.20	SR 328 south – McArthur	Western end of SR 328 concurrency
Hocking	Starr Township	92.15	148.30	SR 328 north – Union Furnace, Logan	Eastern end of SR 328 concurrency
Hocking	Starr Township	96.25	154.90	SR 278 south – Lake Hope State Park, Zaleski	Western end of SR 278 concurrency
Hocking	Starr Township	96.34	155.04	SR 278 north – Nelsonville	Eastern end of SR 278 concurrency
Vinton	No major junctions				
Athens	Waterloo Township	100.61	161.92	SR 356 south – Mineral, Albany	Northern terminus of SR 356
Athens	Waterloo Township	101.79	163.82	SR 691 north – Nelsonville	Southern terminus of SR 691
Athens	Athens	108.80	175.10	SR 682 (South Plains Street) / West Union Street – The Plains, Chauncey	
1.000 mi = 1.609 km; 1.000 km = 0.621 mi: Concurrency terminus
