= Ohio State Route 664 =

State highway in southern Ohio, US

State Route 664

Route information
- Maintained by ODOT
- Length: 37.08 mi (59.67 km)
- Existed: 1937–present

Major junctions
- South end: SR 56 in South Bloomingville
- US 33 in Logan; US 22 in Rushville
- North end: SR 256 near Rushville

Location
- Country: United States
- State: Ohio
- Counties: Hocking, Fairfield

Highway system
- Ohio State Highway System; Interstate; US; State; Scenic
← SR 663	→ SR 665

State Route 664 (SR 664) is a north–south state highway in the southern portion of the U.S. state of Ohio. The highway has its southern terminus at a T-intersection with SR 56 in the unincorporated community of South Bloomingville. The northern terminus of SR 664 is also at a T-intersection, this time with SR 256 on the Fairfield–Perry county line approximately 4.75 miles (7.64 km) north of the village of Rushville.

== Route description ==
Along its way, SR 664 passes through portions of Hocking and Fairfield Counties. No segment of this highway is included as a part of the National Highway System, a network of routes identified as being most important for the country's economy, mobility and defense.

== History ==
SR 664 was designated in 1937. The original routing of this highway included the current stretch of SR 374 from its southern terminus at SR 56 southeast of South Bloomingville to the eastern intersection between SR 374 and SR 664, and the present routing of SR 664 from that point to its northern terminus at SR 256 north of Rushville. After just one year, SR 664 was shortened when its southern terminus was moved to the present eastern junction of SR 374 and SR 664. This occurred as a result of SR 374 being extended from that location south along the former section of SR 664 to its present southern endpoint at SR 56.

In 1946, SR 664 took on the shape that it has today. From the eastern SR 374/SR 664 junction, SR 664 was routed west concurrent with SR 374 for a distance of more than 2 miles (3.2 km), then southwesterly along a previously un-numbered roadway to South Bloomingville and its present southern terminus at SR 56.

Starting in 2011, SR 664 (along the concurrency with SR 374) was rerouted to a new alignment near the Old Man's Cave area of Hocking Hills State Park. The realignment was needed to reduce the conflict between traffic on the road and pedestrians in the vicinity of the park. The one-mile-long (1.6 km) realignment opened by January 2013. The interchange at US 33 in Logan, originally a standard diamond interchange with an increasing accident rate, was reconstructed to be a double-roundabout or dumbbell interchange that opened on December 4, 2013. This type of interchange is the first constructed and opened in Ohio.

== Major intersections ==
County	Location	mi	km	Destinations	Notes
Hocking	Benton Township	0.00	0.00	SR 56 – Laurelville, Athens	
Hocking	Benton Township	2.90	4.67	SR 374 north to SR 180	Southern end of SR 374 concurrency
Hocking	Benton Township	5.27	8.48	SR 374 south	Northern end of SR 374 concurrency
Hocking	Logan	15.01	24.16	US 33 – Lancaster, Athens	Roundabout
Fairfield	Rush Creek Township	26.27	42.28	SR 312 south	Northern terminus of SR 312
Fairfield	Rush Creek Township	28.83	46.40	SR 37 – New Lexington, Lancaster	
Fairfield	Rushville	31.93	51.39	US 22 – Somerset, Lancaster	
Fairfield–Perry county line	Richland–Thorn township line	37.08	59.67	SR 256	
1.000 mi = 1.609 km; 1.000 km = 0.621 mi: Concurrency terminus
