= Ohio State Route 207 =

State highway in southern Ohio, US

State Route 207

Route information
- Maintained by ODOT
- Length: 32.11 mi (51.68 km)
- Existed: 1962–present

Major junctions
- South end: SR 159 near Chillicothe
- US 23 near Chillicothe; SR 104 in Chillicothe; US 22 near New Holland
- North end: US 62 / SR 3 / SR 56 in Mount Sterling

Location
- Country: United States
- State: Ohio
- Counties: Ross, Pickaway, Fayette, Madison

Highway system
- Ohio State Highway System; Interstate; US; State; Scenic
← SR 206	→ SR 208
← I-277	→ SR 278

State Route 207 (SR 207) is a 32-mile-long (51 km) northwest-southeast state highway in the southern portion of the U.S. state of Ohio. The first northern terminus of SR 207 is at a roundabout with SR 159 nearly four miles (6.4 km) north of Chillicothe. Its second northern terminus is in Mount Sterling, following a 0.33-mile (0.53 km) long concurrence with U.S. Route 62 (US 62) and SR 3, at the intersection where they meet SR 56.

== Route description ==
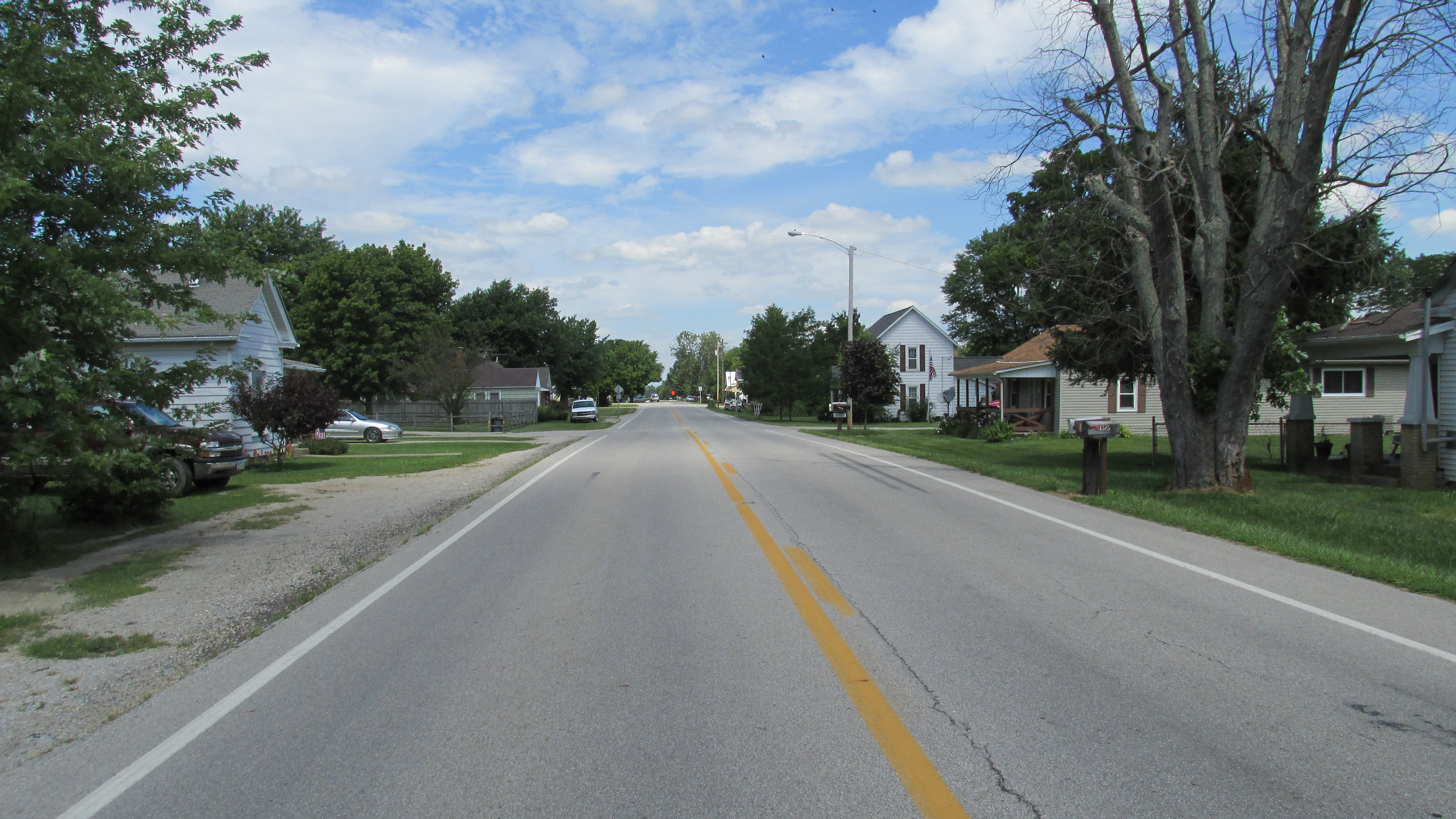
SR 207 through Pancoastburg

Along the way, SR 207 passes through northern Ross County, southwestern Pickaway County, north-eastern Fayette County and extreme south-eastern Madison County. It passes alongside Deer Creek Lake which is within Deer Creek State Park (not to be confused with Deer Creek State Park, UH), about 7 miles (11 km) from its northern terminus in Mount Sterling.

There are no segments of this highway that are included within the National Highway System (NHS). The NHS is a network of highways identified as being most important for the economy, mobility and defence of the nation.

== History ==
SR 207 was assigned in 1962. Running along the majority of SR 207's present path, excepting the southernmost portion of the highway between US 23 and SR 104, along with the SR 104 concurrency, the designation replaced the entirety of what was SR 277 prior to that year. The change was necessitated by the coming of the Interstate Highway System to Ohio, which included construction of Interstate 277 in the Akron vicinity. Ohio follows a standard that no route number can be duplicated between different types of state highways, so SR 277 became SR 207.

In 2007, SR 207 was extended on the south end via a nearly 0.50-mile (0.80 km) concurrency with SR 104, and an all-new alignment running east from SR 104 across the Scioto River to a new interchange with the US 23 expressway in northern Ross County, north of Chillicothe.

SR 207 was later extended from US 23 east to SR 159. Work on $8 million extension commenced in October 2019. Originally, the extension was supposed to intersect with SR 180 and SR 159. However, after officials discovered a wetland in their environmental study, the extension was revised to meet with SR 159 south of SR 180. The extension opened to traffic in October 2020 that included a roundabout at its southern terminus with SR 159.

From the completion of the extension of OH-207 in October 2020, the extension has had multiple signage changes. When the extension was opened, it was signed east-west, which would eventually be changed to north-south in 2021. It would be flipped in 2023, with the part that always has been designated "south" to be designated "south" on the extension instead of "north".

== Major intersections ==
County	Location	mi	km	Destinations	Notes
Ross	Green Township	0.00– 0.09	0.00– 0.14	SR 159	Roundabout
Ross	Green Township	1.02– 1.14	1.64– 1.83	US 23 – Chillicothe, Columbus	Interchange
Ross	Union Township	3.40	5.47	SR 104 south to US 35 – Chillicothe, Hopewell Culture National Historical Park, V.A. Memorial Stadium, Adena Mansion	Southern end of SR 104 concurrency
Ross	Union Township	3.92	6.31	SR 104 north	Northern end of SR 104 concurrency
Ross	Clarksburg	14.58	23.46	SR 138 (High Street)	
Pickaway	Perry Township	20.04	32.25	US 22 – Circleville, New Holland, Washington Court House	
Fayette	No major junctions				
Madison	Mount Sterling	31.77	51.13	US 62 west / SR 3 (West Columbus Street)	Southern end of US 62/SR 3 concurrency
Madison	Mount Sterling	32.04	51.56	US 62 east / SR 3 north (East Columbus Street) / SR 56 east (South London Street)	Northern end of US 62/SR 3 concurrency; southern end of SR 56 concurrency
Madison	Mount Sterling	32.11	51.68	US 62 west / SR 3 south (Main Street) / SR 56 west (North London Street) to I-71	Northern end of SR 56 concurrency
1.000 mi = 1.609 km; 1.000 km = 0.621 mi: Concurrency terminus
