= Karshner Mound =

Archaeological site in Ohio, United States

- U.S. National Register of Historic Places
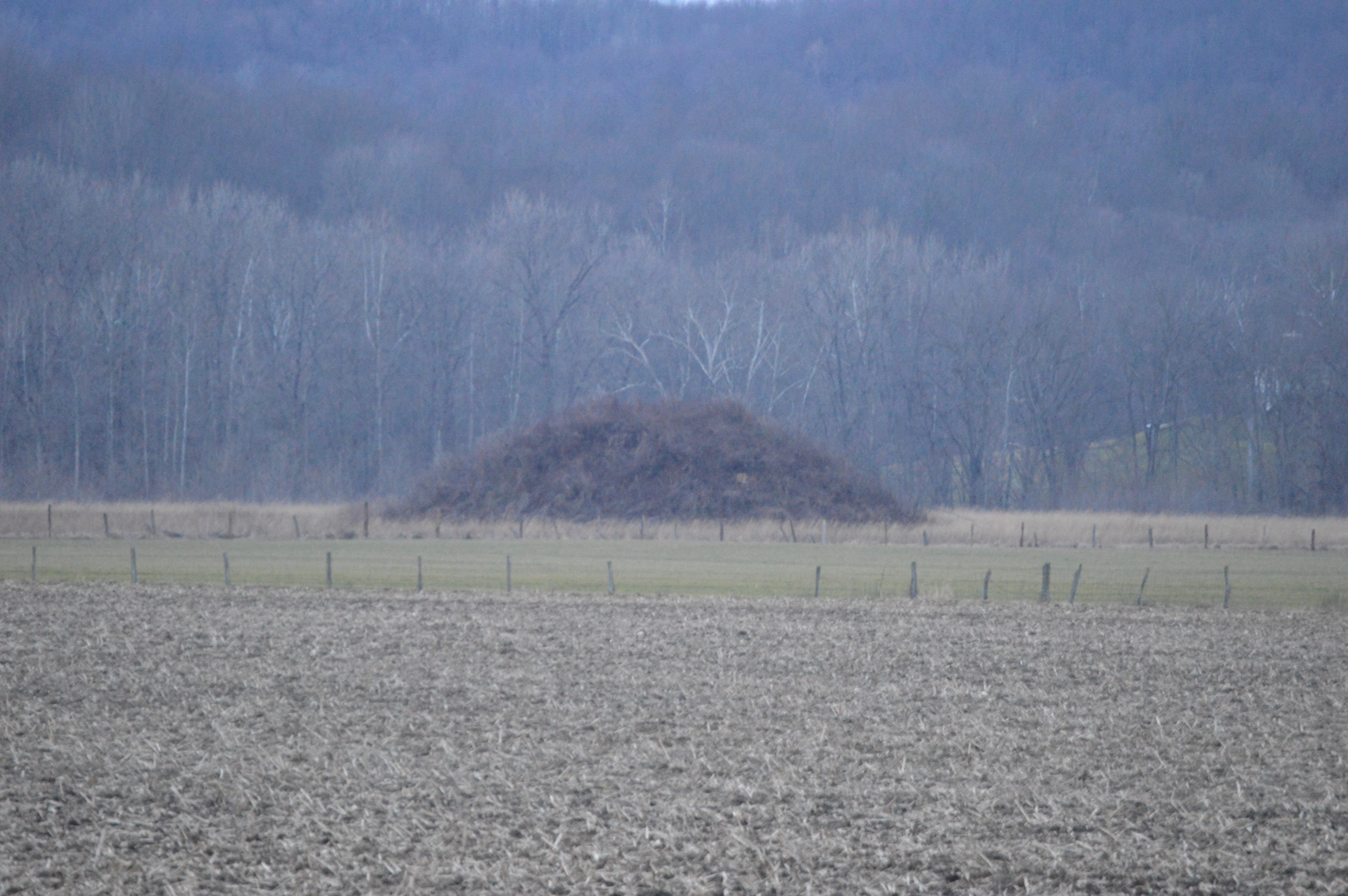
- Seen from State Route 56 to the east

- Location within Ohio Location within the United States
- Location: Second terrace above Salt Creek
- Nearest city: Laurelville, Ohio
- Coordinates: 39°27′5.4″N 82°43′12″W
- Area: 2 acres (0.81 ha)
- NRHP reference No.: 74001527
- Added to NRHP: July 15, 1974

The Karshner Mound is a Native American mound in the southeastern portion of the U.S. state of Ohio. Located near the village of Laurelville in Hocking County, it is one of Ohio's largest remaining burial mounds that has not been significantly damaged since white settlement. Measuring 100 feet (30 m) in diameter and 28 feet (8.5 m) high, it lies in the middle of a farm field, but it has never been cultivated, and vegetation on the mound has prevented erosion.

Although no archaeological investigation has ever been carried out at the Karshner Mound, it is believed to have been constructed by people of the Adena culture, who inhabited the region between 1000 BC and AD 400. This identification is based on its shape and location; the Karshner Mound lies on the second terrace above Salt Creek, and large numbers of mounds on terraces above small streams have been found to be constructed by the Adena. Because of this identification, the mound is seen as a valuable archaeological site and believed to be likely to yield many informative artifacts if excavated. In recognition of its archaeological value, it was listed on the National Register of Historic Places in 1974.
