= Ohio State Route 159 =

State highway in Ohio, US

State Route 159

Route information
- Maintained by ODOT
- Length: 30.91 mi (49.74 km)
- Existed: 1923–present

Major junctions
- South end: US 23 Bus. / US 50 / SR 104 in Chillicothe
- US 35 in Chillicothe; US 23 near Chillicothe; SR 207 near Chillicothe; SR 180 near Kingston
- North end: US 22 near Lancaster

Location
- Country: United States
- State: Ohio
- Counties: Ross, Pickaway, Fairfield

Highway system
- Ohio State Highway System; Interstate; US; State; Scenic
← SR 158	→ SR 160

State Route 159 (SR 159) is a northeast-southwest state highway (signed north–south) in the south-central portion of the U.S. state of Ohio. Its southern terminus is in Chillicothe at the U.S. Route 50 and State Route 104 concurrency; its northern terminus is at U.S. Route 22 approximately 4 miles (6.4 km) southwest of Lancaster.

== History ==
SR 159 was original signed in 1923, on much of its current alignment. In 1927 the route was extended south to US 23, along the alignment of former State Route 27. The first section of road paved was in 1933 and it was a section from the southern terminus to Meade. In 1935 the second section was paved between Meade and Tarlton. The final section of the roadway was paved between Tarlton and the northern terminus, in 1938. The route was extended north to its current terminus along the former alignment of U.S. Route 22, in 1971. In 1972 the highway was extended south to its current terminus along the former alignment of U.S. Route 23.

A construction project in Ross County added two roundabouts at a new intersection with SR 207 and the intersection of SR 180. Construction began in October 2019 and was completed the following October.

== Major intersections ==
County	Location	mi	km	Destinations	Notes
Ross	Chillicothe	0.00	0.00	US 23 Bus. south / US 50 / SR 104 (South Bridge Street / Main Street)	Southern end of US 23 Business concurrency; Bridge Street continues from the south
Ross	Chillicothe			Stewart Road, Consumer Center Drive	Grade separation
Ross	Chillicothe	1.01	1.63	US 35 – Jackson, Dayton	Five-ramp Partial cloverleaf interchange
Ross	Springfield Township	3.73	6.00	US 23 / US 23 Bus. ends – Portsmouth, Columbus	Northern end of US 23 Business concurrency and northern terminus of US 23 Business; interchange
Ross	Green Township	6.00	9.66	SR 207 west	Eastern terminus of SR 207; Roundabout
Ross	Green Township	6.52	10.49	SR 180 east	Western terminus of SR 180; Roundabout
Pickaway	Pickaway Township	11.10	17.86	SR 361 north	Southern terminus of SR 361
Pickaway	Salt Creek Township	16.30	26.23	SR 56 – Laurelville, Circleville	
Fairfield	Hocking Township	30.91	49.74	US 22 (Cincinnati-Zanesville Road SW) – Lancaster	
1.000 mi = 1.609 km; 1.000 km = 0.621 mi: Concurrency terminus
