= Murders of Annette Cooper and Todd Schultz =

1982 American murders of an Ohio couple

Annette Cooper and Todd Schultz

On October 4, 1982, Annette Cooper, 18, and Todd Schultz, 19, both of Logan, Ohio, and who were engaged to one another, went missing. Their dismembered bodies were recovered two weeks later in the Hocking River and a cornfield in West Logan. Both had been shot before being dismembered.

Cooper's stepfather, Dale Johnston, was arrested in 1983, convicted, and sentenced to death by a three-judge panel in 1984. Johnston was later retried, found not guilty, and released from prison in 1990. In 2008, two other men, including Chester McKnight, confessed to the killings and dismemberments. In 2012, Johnston was declared innocent. In 2020, Johnston received a settlement of $775,000 from the state of Ohio.

== Background and initial events ==
Annette Cooper, her mother Sarah, sister Michelle, and stepfather Dale Johnston moved from Xenia, Ohio, to a farm outside Logan, Ohio, in the 1970s. On October 4, 1982, Annette, a Hocking College student, went missing with Todd Schultz, to whom she was engaged. Their torsos were recovered on October 14 from the Hocking River and their heads and limbs were found on October 16 in several shallow graves in a cornfield in West Logan, approximately 1 mile (1.6 km) from where the couple had last been seen. Both had been shot before being dismembered.

== Investigation and trials ==
Cooper's stepfather, Dale Johnston, had been known to be opposed to the couple's engagement. Rumors had spread that Johnston had molested Annette; these were denied by Johnston, Sarah, and Michelle. Logan police and prosecutors focused on Johnston as their primary suspect immediately, although there were reliable witnesses whose accounts disputed their theory of the crime, which was that Johnston had killed and dismembered the couple at the Johnston farm, then bagged the body parts and transported them to the river and the cornfield.

Johnston was arrested in September 1983. He was tried before a panel of three judges, comprising Joseph Cirigliano of Lorain County and Michael Corrigan of Cuyahoga County, with James E. Stillwell of Hocking County presiding. The prosecution's theory was that Johnston was in love with his stepdaughter and killed her and her fiancé in a jealous rage. The prosecution failed to disclose the statements of witnesses who could have placed the murder at the cornfield, rather than at the Johnston farm, and the panel allowed evidence that had been obtained through hypnosis to be presented. The panel convicted Johnston in March 1984 and sentenced him to death. His execution was scheduled for October 4, 1984, but a stay was granted in June 1984.

=== Second trial ===
In October 1988, the Ohio Supreme Court ordered a new trial based on evidence the prosecution had withheld and improper admittance of testimony that should not have been allowed. The decision, written by Ralph S. Locher, said that Johnston's rights had been violated by the prosecution's decision to withhold exculpatory information from the defense. In 1990 the Franklin County Court of Appeals ruled that much of the evidence presented in the first trial could not be used in the second trial, and the case was dismissed. Johnston was released in May 1990, but many in Logan still believed him guilty.

== Subsequent events and 2008 arrests ==
After his 1990 release, Johnston filed his initial wrongful conviction and imprisonment claim. The Hocking County court denied it in 1993, ruling that the preponderance of evidence did not prove Johnston innocent. In 2003, legislation brought by Ohio Representative Bill Seitz was passed to amend Ohio's wrongful imprisonment statute.

In September 2008, two men confessed to the crime and were arrested. In December 2008, one of the men, Chester McKnight, pleaded guilty and received two life sentences. The other man, Kenneth Linscott, of Logan, pleaded guilty to misdemeanor abuse of a corpse, received time served, and was released. Rape or intended rape and escaping detection for those crimes were specified as motives for the murders in the indictment. In 2012, a Franklin County, Ohio, judge ruled Johnston innocent, allowing him to sue the state for damages. Then-Ohio Attorney General Mike DeWine appealed, and the decision that allowed Johnston to seek compensation from the state was reversed.

In March 2014 Franklin County Court of Appeals ruled that the 2003 legislation change did not operate retroactively, but Johnston appealed. In February 2014, Mansaray v. State found that the 2003 statute amendment should be interpreted to limit claims to only those errors in procedure occurring after a sentence has been passed. In 2015, the Ohio Supreme Court reversed the decision, ruling that the legislation can be applied retroactively, and ordered the court of appeals to reconsider Johnston's case. A new trial again found Johnston innocent, but in 2016 the Franklin County Court of Appeals again overturned the right to seek compensation, citing Mansaray. The Ohio Supreme Court declined to hear Johnston's appeal the following year.

In 2017 DeWine opposed legislation that would allow Johnston to seek damages from the state. In 2019 that legislation was passed and overset Mansaray's limitations in cases of a Brady violation; it was signed into law by John Kasich in December 2018, the month before DeWine would have taken office as Ohio governor. In 2020, the state of Ohio settled with Johnston for $775,000.

=== Analysis ===
Akron Beacon-Journal reporter Bill Osinski, who covered the case from the first trial, said there was "an astounding lack of physical evidence" but that local opinion had influenced the trial; because Johnston was considered an outsider, he was convicted in popular opinion, which influenced the panel of three judges. Witness to Innocence categorized the factors in the wrongful conviction as involving mistaken witness identification, false or misleading forensic evidence, and prosecutorial misconduct.
