= Pencil Sharpener Museum =

Museum in Ohio, US

Paul A. Johnson Pencil Sharpener Museum
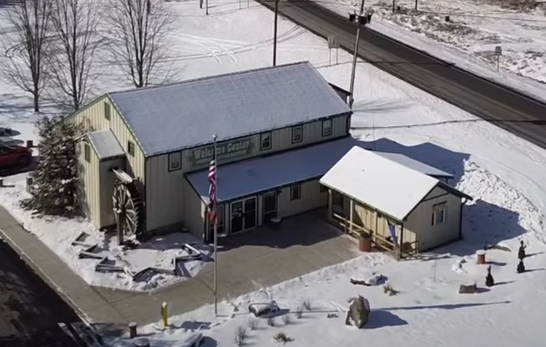
- Hocking Hills Regional Welcome Center in 2024; the Pencil Sharpener Museum is the small building on the right

- Location within Ohio Location within the United States
- Established: 1989; 37 years ago
- Location: 13178 OH-664, Logan, Ohio 43138
- Coordinates: 39.5365°N 82.4445°W
- Collection size: 3,479 (2023)
- Founder: Paul A. Johnson
- Owner: Charlotte A. Johnson

The Pencil Sharpener Museum, officially the Paul A. Johnson Pencil Sharpener Museum, is a museum showcasing about 3,479 pencil sharpeners just outside of Logan, Ohio. It is located off Ohio State Route 664, inside the Hocking Hills Regional Welcome Center. It is believed to be the largest collection of these items in the entire country, claiming to contain no duplicates.

== History ==
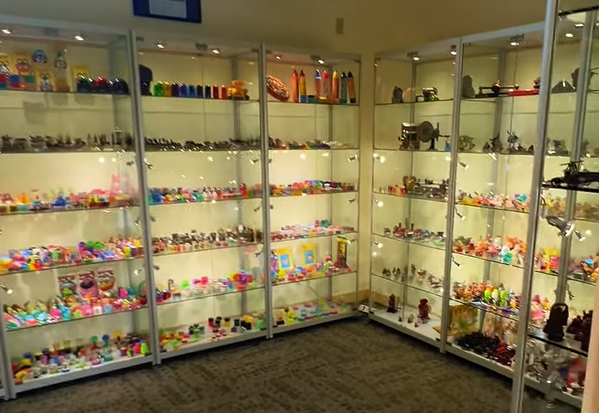
The museum's interior

The collection was started by Rev. Paul Johnson in 1989. His wife, Charlotte, had bought him two metal car-shaped sharpeners as a gift, and Johnson needed a hobby following his retirement in 1988. Johnson died in 2010, and Charlotte decided to move the collection to Hocking Hills Regional Welcome Center.

== Exhibits ==
The pencil sharpeners are organized by category, having sections such as food, travel, music, and others. The oldest sharpeners can be found on the lower shelves, and the collection also contains a book describing the correct way to sharpen a pencil. There are also many different materials in the collection, including plastic, metal, and glass versions, along with ones that can be handheld, hung on the walls, or shelf-mounted.
