= West Logan, Ohio =

Census-designated place in Ohio, United States

- CDP
- Location in the United States
- Coordinates: 39°32′17″N 82°25′43″W
- Country: United States
- State: Ohio
- County: Hocking

Area
  - Total: 0.37 sq mi (0.95 km^{2})
  - Land: 0.36 sq mi (0.93 km^{2})
  - Water: 0.0077 sq mi (0.02 km^{2})
- Elevation: 764 ft (233 m)

Population (2020)
  - Total: 912
  - Density: 2,539.8/sq mi (980.62/km^{2})
- FIPS code: 39-83776
- GNIS feature ID: 2396505

West Logan is a census-designated place in Hocking County, Ohio. The population was 912 at the 2020 census. The community is located on the Hocking River between the city limits of Logan and U.S. Route 33.

== History ==
West Logan was historically home to Falls Mill, a mill built in 1815 by former Ohio governor Thomas Worthington. Falls Mill Bridge, connecting West Logan to the city of Logan through Ohio State Route 664, was named after the mill.

West Logan formerly housed an alternative elementary school in the Logan-Hocking School District.

== Geography ==
According to the United States Census Bureau, the CDP has a total area of 0.36 square miles (0.93 km^{2}), of which 0.35 square miles (0.91 km^{2}) is land and 0.01 square miles (0.02 km^{2}) is water.

== Demographics ==
Historical population
Census	Pop.	Note	%±
2020	912		—
U.S. Decennial Census
