= Longstreth, Ohio =

Unincorporated community in Ohio, U.S.

Coordinates: 39°29′53″N 82°13′13″W

Longstreth is an unincorporated community in Hocking County, in the U.S. state of Ohio.

== History ==
A post office called Longstreth was established in 1890, and remained in operation until 1923.
