= Webb Summit, Ohio =

Unincorporated community in Ohio, U.S.

Coordinates: 39°35′11″N 82°21′43″W

Webb Summit is an unincorporated community in Hocking County, in the U.S. state of Ohio.

== History ==
A post office called Webb Summit was established in 1873 and remained in operation until 1919. The community derives its name from Benjamin Webb, a pioneer minister.
