= D. & J. Ritchie Auctioneers and Appraisers =

Canadian auction house

D. & J. Ritchie Auctioneers and Appraisers (later shortened to Ritchie's) was a Canadian auction house in Toronto in existence from the late 1960s until 1995, when the auction house was sold.

== History ==
Ritchie's was founded by David F. Ritchie and his wife, Marlene M. Ritchie (née Archer). David Ritchie had been born and raised in Newcastle, New Brunswick and served with the Royal Canadian Air Force and the Royal Air Force before attending the University of New Brunswick, graduating in 1948, and Case Western Reserve University, Ohio, graduating in 1955. During his time at school, he had studied Metallurgical Engineering. After graduation, he worked as an assistant editor for Metal Progress magazine and moved back to Canada in 1961, to become editor of Canadian Metalworking.

Marlene Ritchie was born and raised in the small town of Laurelville, Ohio. In her early life, she taught in both the United States and Japan as well as becoming a registered nurse. After marrying she moved to Canada. As the wife of Mr. Ritchie, she took over financial management and administration of the auction house after their first auction in 1970.

Ritchie's auctioned a wide range of material, with particular interest being shown to Canadian Art. In 1981, it published a guide to Canadian art auction prices: 1975-80 for lots selling for $30 or more. Some of Ritchie's most noteworthy auctions are detailed in Mr. Ritchie's book, Ritchie's: The Inside Story (2016). Besides auctions, it did appraisals, often free verbal estimates nationwide. In 1995, the business was sold and given the name, Ritchies Auctioneers and Appraisers. In 2002, Sotheby's Auction, founded in England in 1774 and with a Canadian operation which started in the late 1960s, formed a partnership with Ritchies for its semi-annual Important Canadian Art auctions. According to Alan D. Bryce's Art Smart, in 2006, in combination with Sotheby's, it had a market share of 23%. Ritchies Auctioneers and Appraisers went bankrupt in 2009. In 2011, the Ritchies name was purchased for a new auction house.

Ritchie's catalogues can be found in the Toronto Reference Library.
