= South Bloomingville, Ohio =

Unincorporated community in Ohio, U.S.

Coordinates: 39°25′07″N 82°35′58″W

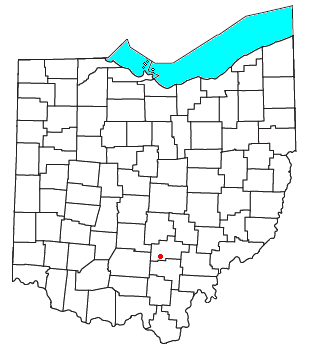
Location of South Bloomingville, Ohio

South Bloomingville is an unincorporated community in western Benton Township, Hocking County, Ohio, United States. Although it is unincorporated, it has a zip code of 43152. It is located at the intersection of State Routes 56 and 664, slightly west of Hocking Hills State Park. Early settlers and brief history can be found in the History of Hocking County. A more complete history with photos is found in the genealogy site of Rootsweb. In 1880 Bloomingville had a population of 165. In the histories there are references to Bloomingville and South Bloomville, the location and distinction is still being discovered.
