= 1952 United States presidential election in Ohio =

- November 4, 1952

All 25 Ohio votes to the Electoral College

Nominee	Dwight D. Eisenhower	Adlai Stevenson
Party	Republican	Democratic
Home state	New York	Illinois
Running mate	Richard Nixon	John Sparkman
Electoral vote	25	0
Popular vote	2,100,391	1,600,367
Percentage	56.76%	43.24%

Eisenhower
50–60%
60–70%
70–80%
80–90%
90–100%
Stevenson
50–60%
60–70%
70–80%
80–90%
Tie
President before election
Harry S. Truman
Democratic
Elected President
Dwight D. Eisenhower
Republican

The 1952 United States presidential election in Ohio took place on November 4, 1952, as part of the 1952 United States presidential election. State voters chose 25 representatives, or electors, to the Electoral College, who voted for president and vice president.

Ohio was won by Columbia University President Dwight D. Eisenhower (R–New York), running with Senator Richard Nixon, with 56.76% of the popular vote, against Adlai Stevenson (D–Illinois), running with Senator John Sparkman, with 43.24% of the popular vote. This result made Ohio around 2.6% more Republican than the nation-at-large.

Eisenhower's victory was the first of three consecutive Republican victories in the state, as Ohio would not vote Democratic again until Lyndon B. Johnson’s landslide victory in 1964.

== Results ==
1952 United States presidential election in Ohio
Party	Candidate	Votes	%
Republican	Dwight D. Eisenhower	2,100,391	56.76%
Democratic	Adlai Stevenson	1,600,367	43.24%
Total votes		3,700,758	100%

=== Results by county ===
County	Dwight D. Eisenhower Republican		Adlai Stevenson Democratic		Margin		Total votes cast
County	#	%	#	%	#	%	Total votes cast
Adams	5,648	58.93%	3,937	41.07%	1,711	17.86%	9,585
Allen	26,396	65.12%	14,139	34.88%	12,257	30.24%	40,535
Ashland	12,459	70.38%	5,244	29.62%	7,215	40.76%	17,703
Ashtabula	23,185	61.24%	14,676	38.76%	8,509	22.48%	37,861
Athens	10,829	60.37%	7,108	39.63%	3,721	20.74%	17,937
Auglaize	10,599	67.30%	5,149	32.70%	5,450	34.60%	15,748
Belmont	17,693	41.68%	24,759	58.32%	-7,066	-16.64%	42,452
Brown	5,635	53.86%	4,828	46.14%	807	7.72%	10,463
Butler	35,769	53.77%	30,751	46.23%	5,018	7.54%	66,520
Carroll	5,707	64.55%	3,134	35.45%	2,573	29.10%	8,841
Champaign	8,880	66.06%	4,563	33.94%	4,317	32.12%	13,443
Clark	27,464	56.92%	20,786	43.08%	6,678	13.84%	48,250
Clermont	13,221	57.68%	9,702	42.32%	3,519	15.36%	22,923
Clinton	8,191	67.83%	3,885	32.17%	4,306	35.66%	12,076
Columbiana	26,707	58.36%	19,057	41.64%	7,650	16.72%	45,764
Coshocton	9,832	62.90%	5,799	37.10%	4,033	25.80%	15,631
Crawford	13,370	66.12%	6,852	33.88%	6,518	32.24%	20,222
Cuyahoga	329,465	50.34%	324,962	49.66%	4,503	0.68%	654,427
Darke	13,670	64.28%	7,597	35.72%	6,073	28.56%	21,267
Defiance	8,834	67.98%	4,161	32.02%	4,673	35.96%	12,995
Delaware	10,682	71.59%	4,239	28.41%	6,443	43.18%	14,921
Erie	14,245	65.36%	7,549	34.64%	6,696	30.72%	21,794
Fairfield	15,027	62.18%	9,140	37.82%	5,887	24.36%	24,167
Fayette	6,800	63.66%	3,882	36.34%	2,918	27.32%	10,682
Franklin	138,894	60.25%	91,620	39.75%	47,274	20.50%	230,514
Fulton	9,191	78.18%	2,565	21.82%	6,626	56.36%	11,756
Gallia	6,763	68.20%	3,153	31.80%	3,610	36.40%	9,916
Geauga	8,975	68.09%	4,207	31.91%	4,768	36.18%	13,182
Greene	12,900	58.58%	9,123	41.42%	3,777	17.16%	22,023
Guernsey	9,749	59.52%	6,631	40.48%	3,118	19.04%	16,380
Hamilton	207,690	59.60%	140,785	40.40%	66,905	19.20%	348,475
Hancock	14,999	73.65%	5,366	26.35%	9,633	47.30%	20,365
Hardin	9,235	64.58%	5,064	35.42%	4,171	29.16%	14,299
Harrison	5,306	59.48%	3,614	40.52%	1,692	18.96%	8,920
Henry	8,029	72.73%	3,010	27.27%	5,019	45.46%	11,039
Highland	8,568	62.15%	5,219	37.85%	3,349	24.30%	13,787
Hocking	4,743	54.64%	3,938	45.36%	805	9.28%	8,681
Holmes	3,891	65.07%	2,089	34.93%	1,802	30.14%	5,980
Huron	12,372	71.73%	4,875	28.27%	7,497	43.46%	17,247
Jackson	7,223	59.18%	4,983	40.82%	2,240	18.36%	12,206
Jefferson	19,569	41.58%	27,499	58.42%	-7,930	-16.84%	47,068
Knox	12,705	69.05%	5,694	30.95%	7,011	38.10%	18,399
Lake	23,483	60.48%	15,346	39.52%	8,137	20.96%	38,829
Lawrence	11,962	56.22%	9,316	43.78%	2,646	12.44%	21,278
Licking	20,385	63.50%	11,718	36.50%	8,667	27.00%	32,103
Logan	11,084	69.81%	4,793	30.19%	6,291	39.62%	15,877
Lorain	33,825	56.36%	26,194	43.64%	7,631	12.72%	60,019
Lucas	97,490	51.71%	91,043	48.29%	6,447	3.42%	188,533
Madison	6,279	66.40%	3,177	33.60%	3,102	32.80%	9,456
Mahoning	53,164	43.98%	67,722	56.02%	-14,558	-12.04%	120,886
Marion	14,583	62.23%	8,851	37.77%	5,732	24.46%	23,434
Medina	14,433	70.39%	6,071	29.61%	8,362	40.78%	20,504
Meigs	6,700	66.76%	3,336	33.24%	3,364	33.52%	10,036
Mercer	9,058	65.72%	4,725	34.28%	4,333	31.44%	13,783
Miami	19,525	65.11%	10,462	34.89%	9,063	30.22%	29,987
Monroe	3,493	52.09%	3,213	47.91%	280	4.18%	6,706
Montgomery	91,905	53.51%	79,860	46.49%	12,045	7.02%	171,765
Morgan	4,303	71.94%	1,678	28.06%	2,625	43.88%	5,981
Morrow	6,106	71.96%	2,379	28.04%	3,727	43.92%	8,485
Muskingum	21,244	62.98%	12,490	37.02%	8,754	25.96%	33,734
Noble	4,046	66.33%	2,054	33.67%	1,992	32.66%	6,100
Ottawa	8,708	59.99%	5,808	40.01%	2,900	19.98%	14,516
Paulding	4,837	66.97%	2,386	33.03%	2,451	33.94%	7,223
Perry	7,425	58.46%	5,275	41.54%	2,150	16.92%	12,700
Pickaway	6,836	57.23%	5,109	42.77%	1,727	14.46%	11,945
Pike	2,982	43.37%	3,893	56.63%	-911	-13.26%	6,875
Portage	17,168	55.88%	13,553	44.12%	3,615	11.76%	30,721
Preble	8,405	63.48%	4,836	36.52%	3,569	26.96%	13,241
Putnam	8,398	68.85%	3,799	31.15%	4,599	37.70%	12,197
Richland	25,829	63.60%	14,780	36.40%	11,049	27.20%	40,609
Ross	13,431	61.01%	8,585	38.99%	4,846	22.02%	22,016
Sandusky	14,939	71.18%	6,048	28.82%	8,891	42.36%	20,987
Scioto	20,403	52.93%	18,145	47.07%	2,258	5.86%	38,548
Seneca	17,750	71.54%	7,060	28.46%	10,690	43.08%	24,810
Shelby	8,957	62.68%	5,333	37.32%	3,624	25.36%	14,290
Stark	74,929	57.66%	55,031	42.34%	19,898	15.32%	129,960
Summit	91,168	48.34%	97,443	51.66%	-6,275	-3.32%	188,611
Trumbull	37,793	49.17%	39,062	50.83%	-1,269	-1.66%	76,855
Tuscarawas	18,620	53.27%	16,332	46.73%	2,288	6.54%	34,952
Union	7,761	73.19%	2,843	26.81%	4,918	46.38%	10,604
Van Wert	9,355	64.68%	5,108	35.32%	4,247	29.36%	14,463
Vinton	2,903	58.86%	2,029	41.14%	874	17.72%	4,932
Warren	11,529	62.04%	7,054	37.96%	4,475	24.08%	18,583
Washington	13,841	65.24%	7,376	34.76%	6,465	30.48%	21,217
Wayne	18,074	68.23%	8,414	31.77%	9,660	36.46%	26,488
Williams	9,888	74.65%	3,358	25.35%	6,530	49.30%	13,246
Wood	17,269	65.32%	9,168	34.68%	8,101	30.64%	26,437
Wyandot	7,015	71.64%	2,777	28.36%	4,238	43.28%	9,792
Totals	2,100,391	56.76%	1,600,367	43.24%	500,024	13.52%	3,700,758

==== Counties that flipped from Democratic to Republican ====
- Brown
- Butler
- Cuyahoga
- Hocking
- Lawrence
- Lucas
- Mercer
- Monroe
- Montgomery
- Ottawa
- Pickaway
- Portage
- Putnam
- Scioto
- Shelby
- Tuscarawas

== See also ==
- United States presidential elections in Ohio
