= Gibisonville, Ohio =

- Unincorporated community
- Location within Ohio Location within the United States
- Coordinates: 39°28′59″N 82°35′11″W
- Country: United States
- State: Ohio
- County: Hocking
- Township: Good Hope
- Elevation: 1,109 ft (338 m)
- ZIP code: 43149
- Area code: 740
- GNIS feature ID: 1064736

Gibisonville is an unincorporated community in Laurel Township, Hocking County, in the U.S. state of Ohio. It is located along State Route 678, approximately 9 miles southwest of Logan.

== History ==
Gibisonville was laid out in 1840 by settlers Samuel and William Gibison, whose surname the village bears. A post office operated under the name Gibisonville from 1850 until it was discontinued in 1969. The community served early residents of the surrounding forested hills and farmland.

== Geography ==
Gibisonville lies in the unglaciated portion of the Allegheny Plateau, known for its hilly terrain, gorges, and sandstone rock formations. The GNIS lists its elevation as 1,109 feet (338 m).
