= Union Furnace, Ohio =

Unincorporated community in Ohio, U.S.

Coordinates: 39°27′42″N 82°21′23″W

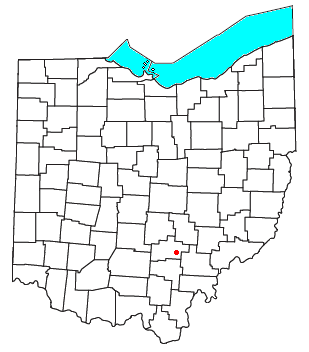
Location of Union Furnace, Ohio

Union Furnace is an unincorporated community in northern Starr Township, Hocking County, Ohio, United States. It has a post office with the ZIP code 43158. It is located along State Route 328, which forms the main street in Union Furnace.

== History ==
Union Furnace is named for a charcoal blast furnace first built on the site in 1826 by James Rodgers, John Means, John Sparks, and Valentine Fear; it began operation in 1827 under the company Rodgers & Co.

This furnace was notable as the first charcoal blast furnace in Ohio’s Hanging Rock Iron Region, pioneering industrial activity in the area.

By the 1840s, operations were reorganized under Hamilton & Co. and later Hamilton-Peebles & Co. The furnace produced up to 2.5 tons of iron per day (a strong output for the era) and even experimented with not operating on Sundays, a practice adopted between December 20, 1844, and January 6, 1847.

Ownership shifted over time until John Garrett took over in 1858, at which point the furnace and the surrounding settlement officially became known as Union Furnace.

A post office has operated at the community since 1873, solidifying Union Furnace's identity as a permanent settlement.
