= Rockbridge, Ohio =

Census-designated place in Ohio, U.S.

- Census-designated place
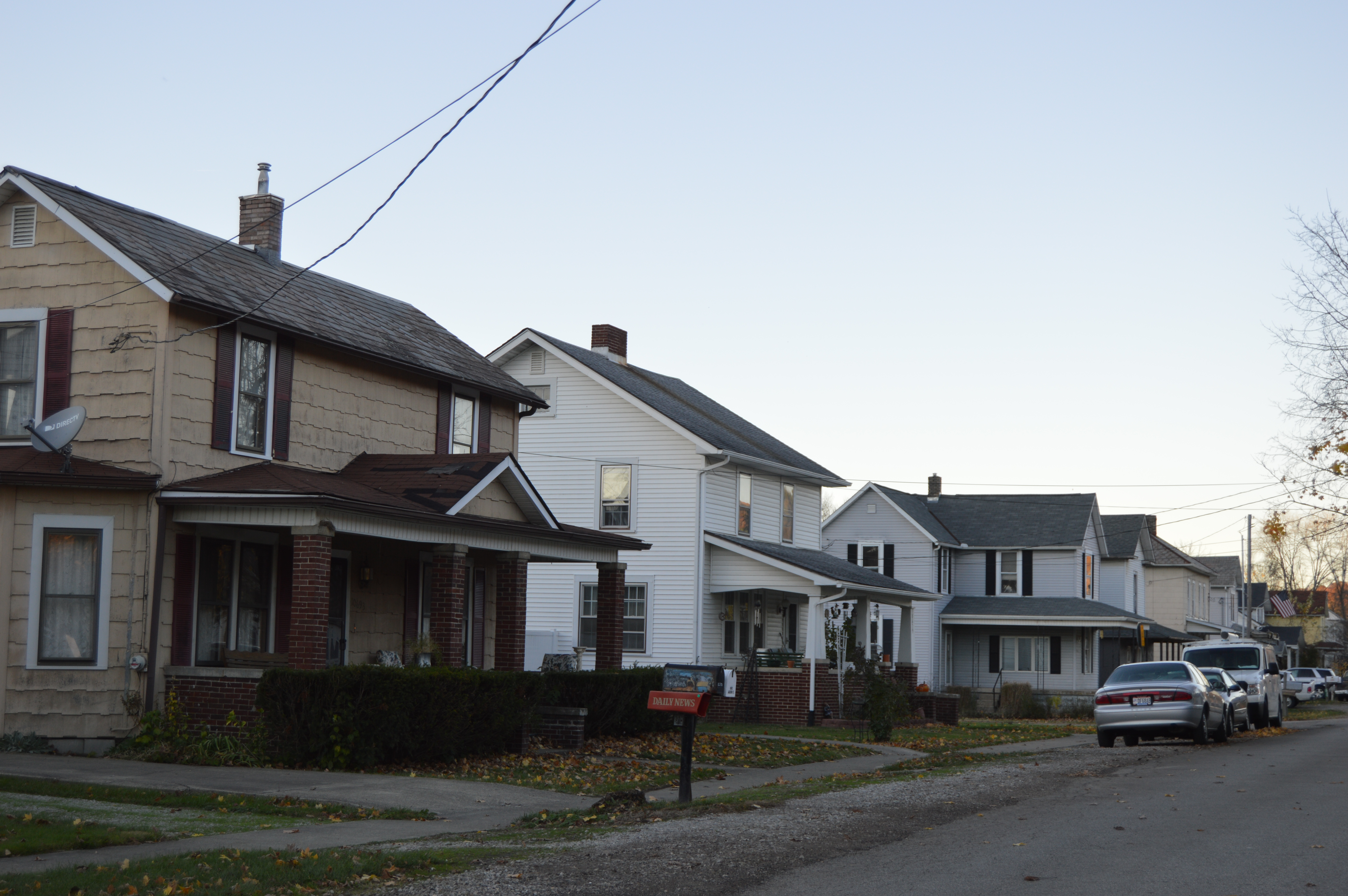
- Houses on Jackson Street south of the post office

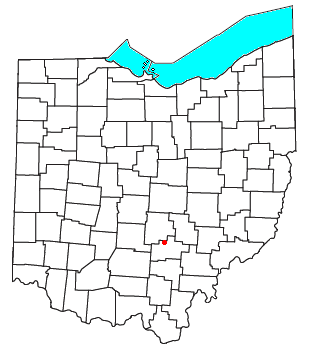
- Location of Rockbridge, Ohio
- Coordinates: 39°35′10″N 82°31′34″W
- Country: United States
- State: Ohio
- County: Hocking
- Township: Good Hope

Area
  - Total: 0.38 sq mi (0.98 km^{2})
  - Land: 0.38 sq mi (0.98 km^{2})
  - Water: 0 sq mi (0.00 km^{2})
- Elevation: 846 ft (258 m)

Population (2020)
  - Total: 160
  - Density: 423.6/sq mi (163.55/km^{2})
- Time zone: UTC-5 (Eastern (EST))
  - Summer (DST): UTC-4 (EDT)
- ZIP code: 43149
- Area code: 740
- FIPS code: 39-67804
- GNIS feature ID: 2628962

Rockbridge is an unincorporated community and census-designated place (CDP) in eastern Good Hope Township, Hocking County, Ohio, United States. It has a post office with the ZIP code 43149. It is located at the interchange of U.S. Route 33 and State Route 374, between Logan and Lancaster. As of the 2020 census the population of the CDP was 160.

== History ==
A post office called Rockbridge has been in operation since 1863. The community was named after a nearby natural sandstone arch, which stretches approximately 100 feet (30 m) in length and 10 to 20 feet (3.0 to 6.1 m) in width. In the 19th century, the arrival of the Hocking Canal and later the railroad increased visitation to the area. In 1977, the land surrounding the arch was sold to the state, and in 1978 it was designated as the Rockbridge State Nature Preserve.

The Rockbridge Network, a political advocacy group formed during a 2019 conference at an inn near Rockbridge, was named after the town.

== Geography ==
Rockbridge is located in eastern Good Hope Township at the junction of U.S. Route 33 and State Route 374, approximately 40 miles (64 km) southeast of Columbus. The area lies within the Hocking Hills region of the Allegheny Plateau, known for its rugged topography, sandstone cliffs, and forested valleys.

== Rockbridge State Nature Preserve ==
The Rockbridge State Nature Preserve spans 182 acres and protects the Rockbridge Natural Arch, Ohio's largest natural bridge. The arch is carved from Mississippian Black Hand Sandstone and formed by erosion over millions of years. It is approximately 100 feet (30 m) long, 10 to 20 feet (3.0 to 6.1 m) wide, and 3 to 5 feet (0.91 to 1.52 m) thick, arching about 50 feet (15 m) above a ravine on a tributary of the Hocking River. The preserve includes about 2.75 miles (4.43 km) of hiking trails, including one leading directly to the bridge and another forming a longer loop.

== Recreation and tourism ==
Rockbridge serves as a gateway to the Hocking Hills region and hosts numerous tourist attractions including zip-lining (such as Hocking Hills Canopy Tours), antique shops, cabin rentals, and canoe outfitters. The nearby Clear Creek Metro Park offers additional hiking trails, birdwatching, and naturalist programs. Rockbridge’s proximity to U.S. Route 33 makes it a common stop for visitors heading into Hocking Hills.

== Transportation ==
The community is centered around the interchange of U.S. Route 33 and State Route 374. Historically, both the Hocking Canal and railroads played a significant role in bringing tourists and settlers to the area.

== Demographics ==
Historical population
Census	Pop.	Note	%±
2020	160		—
U.S. Decennial Census
