= Good Hope Township, Hocking County, Ohio =

Township in Ohio, US

- Township
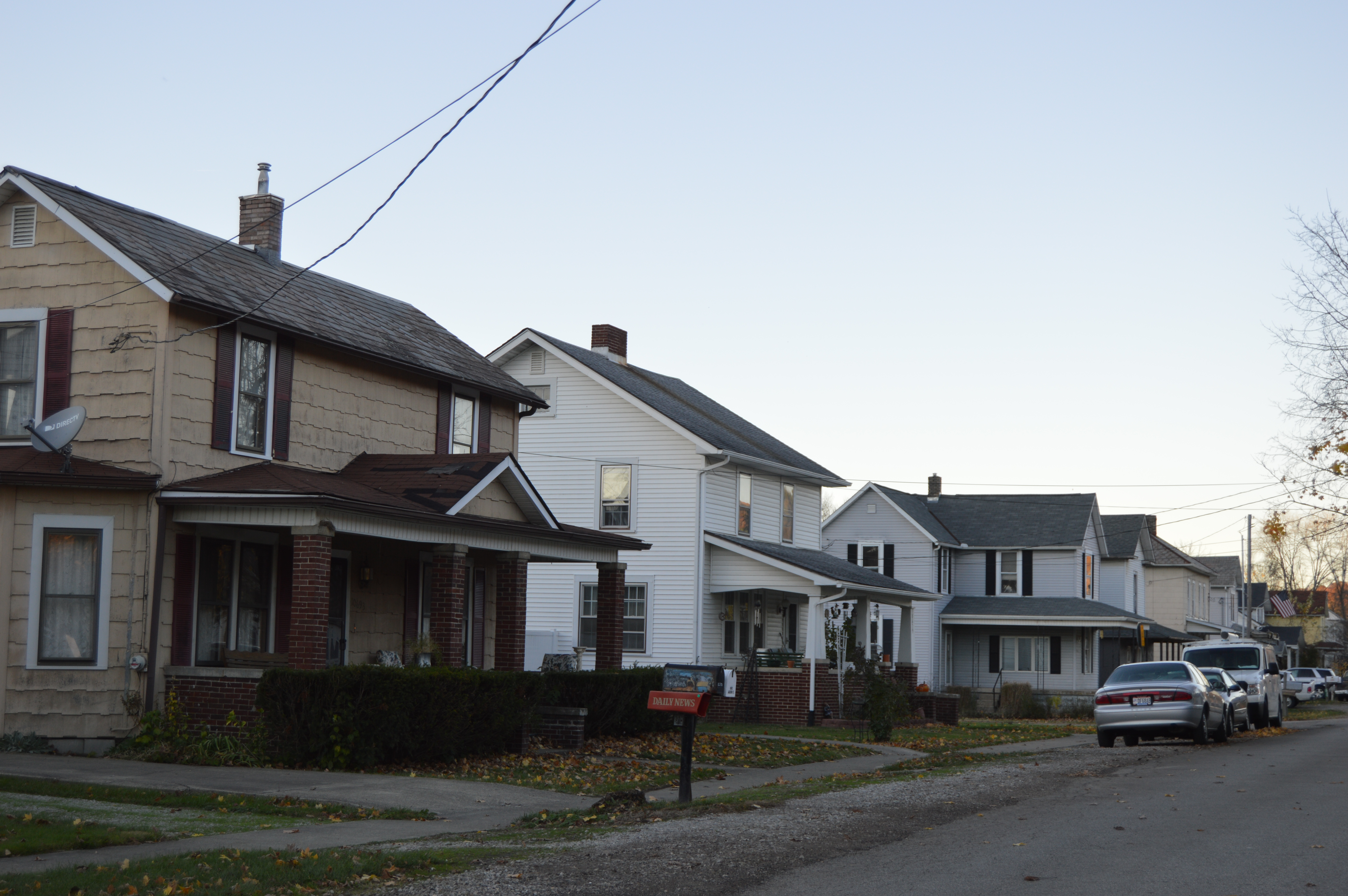
- Houses in Rockbridge

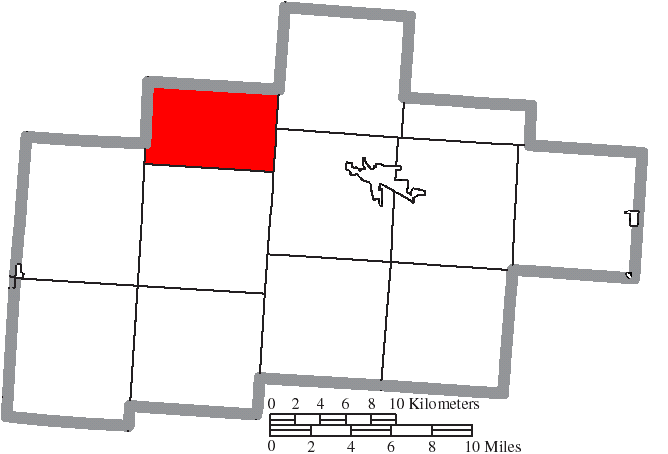
- Location of Good Hope Township in Hocking County
- Coordinates: 39°34′35″N 82°33′2″W
- Country: United States
- State: Ohio
- County: Hocking

Area
  - Total: 26.4 sq mi (68.5 km^{2})
  - Land: 26.3 sq mi (68.2 km^{2})
  - Water: 0.12 sq mi (0.3 km^{2})
- Elevation: 981 ft (299 m)

Population (2020)
  - Total: 1,331
  - Density: 50.5/sq mi (19.5/km^{2})
- Time zone: UTC-5 (Eastern (EST))
  - Summer (DST): UTC-4 (EDT)
- FIPS code: 39-30842
- GNIS feature ID: 1086318

Good Hope Township is one of the eleven townships of Hocking County, Ohio, United States. As of the 2020 census the population was 1,331.

== Geography ==
Located in the northwestern part of the county, it borders the following townships:

- Berne Township, Fairfield County - north
- Marion Township - northeast
- Falls Township (southwestern portion) - southeast
- Laurel Township - south
- Perry Township - southwest
- Madison Township, Fairfield County - west

No municipalities are located in Good Hope Township, although the census-designated place of Rockbridge lies in the northern part of the township.

== Name and history ==
Good Hope Township was established in the early 19th century, shortly after the formation of Hocking County in 1818. It was named for the Catholic church “Our Lady of Good Hope,” a landmark of the early settlement. Families such as the Smiths and Koons were among the earliest settlers.

Good Hope Township was likely named after the former Our Lady of Good Hope Catholic church.

It is the only Good Hope Township statewide.

== Tourism ==
Good Hope Township is located in the heart of the Hocking Hills region, a popular destination for outdoor recreation and nature tourism. The township contains the Rockbridge State Nature Preserve, home to one of the largest natural rock bridges in Ohio. The preserve features sandstone cliffs, forest trails, and access to the Hocking River.

Good Hope Township also hosts Hocking Hills Canopy Tours, Ohio’s first zipline canopy tour. Opened in 2007, the attraction offers guided aerial adventures through forests, over ravines, and across the Hocking River. Variants include the original Canopy Tour, the "SuperZip" high-speed line, and nighttime ziplining.

The township lies just northwest of Hocking Hills State Park, which draws hundreds of thousands of visitors annually to its caves, waterfalls, and scenic hiking trails.

== Government ==
The township is governed by a three-member board of trustees, who are elected in November of odd-numbered years to a four-year term beginning on the following January 1. Two are elected in the year after the presidential election and one is elected in the year before it. There is also an elected township fiscal officer, who serves a four-year term beginning on April 1 of the year after the election, which is held in November of the year before the presidential election. Vacancies in the fiscal officership or on the board of trustees are filled by the remaining trustees.
