= Mount Sterling, Ohio =

Village in Madison County, Ohio, US

- Village
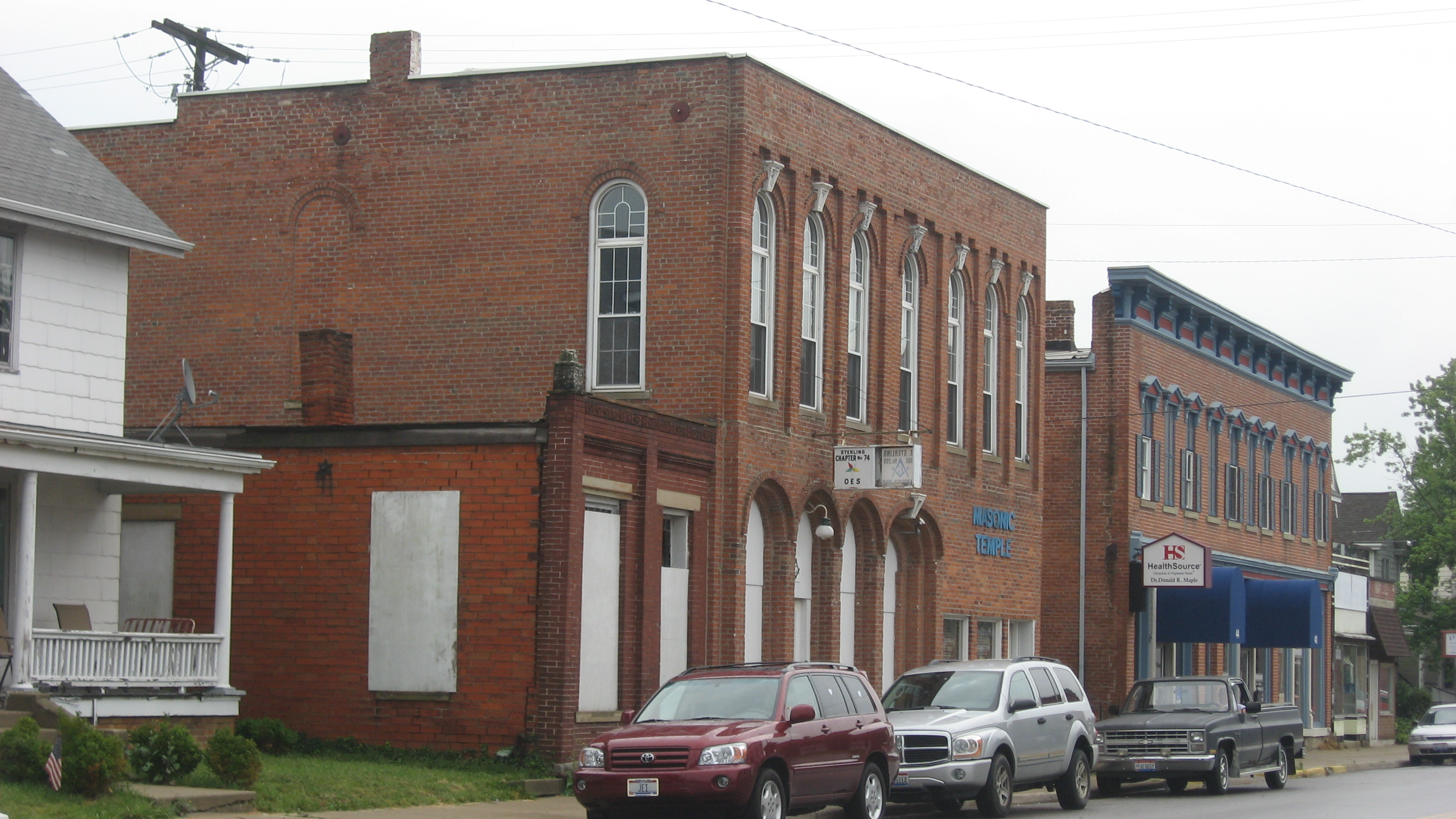
- London Street in the historic district

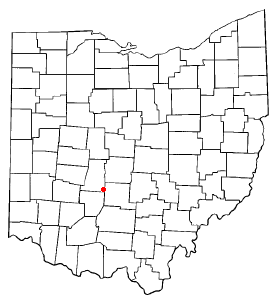
- Location of Mount Sterling, Ohio

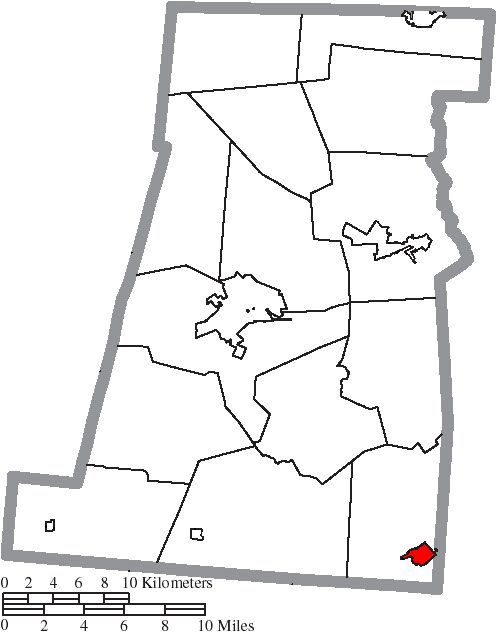
- Location of Mount Sterling in Madison County
- Coordinates: 39°42′48″N 83°16′25″W
- Country: United States
- State: Ohio
- County: Madison
- Township: Pleasant

Government
  - Mayor: Marci Darlington

Area
  - Total: 1.69 sq mi (4.37 km^{2})
  - Land: 1.69 sq mi (4.37 km^{2})
  - Water: 0 sq mi (0.00 km^{2})
- Elevation: 906 ft (276 m)

Population (2020)
  - Total: 1,945
  - Density: 1,152.1/sq mi (444.84/km^{2})
- Time zone: UTC-5 (Eastern (EST))
  - Summer (DST): UTC-4 (EDT)
- ZIP code: 43143
- Area code: 740
- FIPS code: 39-53046
- GNIS feature ID: 2399417
- Website: mtsterling.org

Mount Sterling is a village in Madison County, Ohio, United States. The population was 1,945 at the 2020 census. It is a part of the Columbus, Ohio Metropolitan Statistical Area.

== History ==
Mount Sterling was laid out in 1826 or 1828 by John J. Smith, Esq. of Mount Sterling, Kentucky, named after Smith's hometown, and recorded at London on June 26, 1829. The Mount Sterling Post Office was established on June 8, 1830, with Rowland Wilson as the first postmaster. The post office was discontinued on November 15, 1831, but re-established on April 6, 1832. The town was incorporated on March 12, 1845, and the corporation limits expanded in 1873. As of 1875, the community contained three churches, one bank, five dry goods stores, three grocery stores, two drug stores, one hotel, two harness shops, one hardware store, one stove store, two boot and shoe stores, two blacksmith shops, a carriage manufacturing company, one wagon shop, four physicians, and one flour mill. As of 1915, the town was lighted by electricity, had a city waterworks, and contained two grain elevators, one opera house, one high school, one grade school, and multiple churches and stores.

The Mount Sterling Public Library is located at 60 W. Columbus Street. The American Legion Post 417 is located at 27 Clark Street.

School-age children attend either the Miami Trace school district near Washington Court House, Ohio, or the Madison-Plains school district near London, Ohio. Both are about 15 miles from Mount Sterling.

== Geography ==
According to the United States Census Bureau, the village has a total area of 1.73 square miles (4.48 km^{2}), all land.

== Demographics ==
Historical population
Census	Pop.	Note	%±
1850	118		—
1870	389		—
1880	482		23.9%
1890	752		56.0%
1900	986		31.1%
1910	1,071		8.6%
1920	1,113		3.9%
1930	1,090		−2.1%
1940	1,115		2.3%
1950	1,172		5.1%
1960	1,338		14.2%
1970	1,536		14.8%
1980	1,623		5.7%
1990	1,647		1.5%
2000	1,865		13.2%
2010	1,782		−4.5%
2020	1,945		9.1%
U.S. Decennial Census

=== 2010 census ===
As of the census of 2010, there were 1,782 people, 738 households, and 456 families residing in the village. The population density was 1,030.1 inhabitants per square mile (397.7/km^{2}). There were 841 housing units at an average density of 486.1 per square mile (187.7/km^{2}). The racial makeup of the village was 97.5% White, 0.3% African American, 0.4% Native American, 0.7% Asian, 0.3% from other races, and 0.7% from two or more races. Hispanic or Latino of any race were 2.0% of the population.

There were 738 households, of which 33.6% had children under the age of 18 living with them, 42.1% were married couples living together, 14.2% had a female householder with no husband present, 5.4% had a male householder with no wife present, and 38.2% were non-families. 31.7% of all households were made up of individuals, and 12.9% had someone living alone who was 65 years of age or older. The average household size was 2.40 and the average family size was 2.98.

The median age in the village was 36.3 years. 24.1% of residents were under the age of 18; 10.8% were between the ages of 18 and 24; 25.9% were from 25 to 44; 26.1% were from 45 to 64; and 13.1% were 65 years of age or older. The gender makeup of the village was 47.5% male and 52.5% female.

=== 2000 census ===
As of the census of 2000, there were 1,865 people, 780 households, and 497 families residing in the village. The population density was 1,897.9 inhabitants per square mile (732.8/km^{2}). There were 828 housing units at an average density of 842.6 per square mile (325.3/km^{2}). The racial makeup of the village was 97.32% White, 0.21% African American, 0.32% Native American, 0.11% Asian, 0.86% from other races, and 1.18% from two or more races. Hispanic or Latino of any race were 1.98% of the population.

There were 780 households, out of which 32.6% had children under the age of 18 living with them, 44.7% were married couples living together, 14.6% had a female householder with no husband present, and 36.2% were non-families. 32.2% of all households were made up of individuals, and 14.2% had someone living alone who was 65 years of age or older. The average household size was 2.39 and the average family size was 3.01.

In the village, the population was spread out, with 27.7% under the age of 18, 10.4% from 18 to 24, 29.7% from 25 to 44, 19.2% from 45 to 64, and 13.0% who were 65 years of age or older. The median age was 34 years. For every 100 females there were 86.7 males. For every 100 womenage 18 and over, there were 84.5 men.

The median income for a household in the village was $33,412, and the median income for a family was $40,543. Males had a median income of $32,264 versus $25,819 for females. The per capita income for the village was $16,138. About 7.9% of families and 9.4% of the population were below the poverty line, including 9.3% of those under age 18 and 9.8% of those age 65 or over.

== Government ==
As of 2020, the mayor is Marci Darlington.

The village had a small police department. In September 2011, all the paid officers except Chief Mike McCoy were laid off due to budget problems. In March 2012, the press reported that a part-time officer used a Taser to subdue a nine-year-old boy. As a result of the incident, the chief was suspended for three days while state officials investigated shutting down the department. The Chief later announced his resignation, officially for reasons unrelated to the taser incident. Since then, the Madison County Sheriff's Office has taken over.

In June 2016, Village Administrator Joe Johnson was arrested on various counts of fraud and theft and the Village was placed under the supervision of the Auditor of the State of Ohio. A year later, Mr. Johnson was convicted of committing various crimes and thefts estimated to be in excess of $1 million as was sentenced to over 10 years in jail.

Instead of a Village Administrator, a Physical Manager has been appointed by the State Auditor.

== Notable people ==
- John W. Bricker, U.S. senator and 54th governor of Ohio
- John W. Galbreath, philanthropist
- Bob Hill, basketball coach
