= Benton Township, Hocking County, Ohio =

Township in Ohio, US

- Township
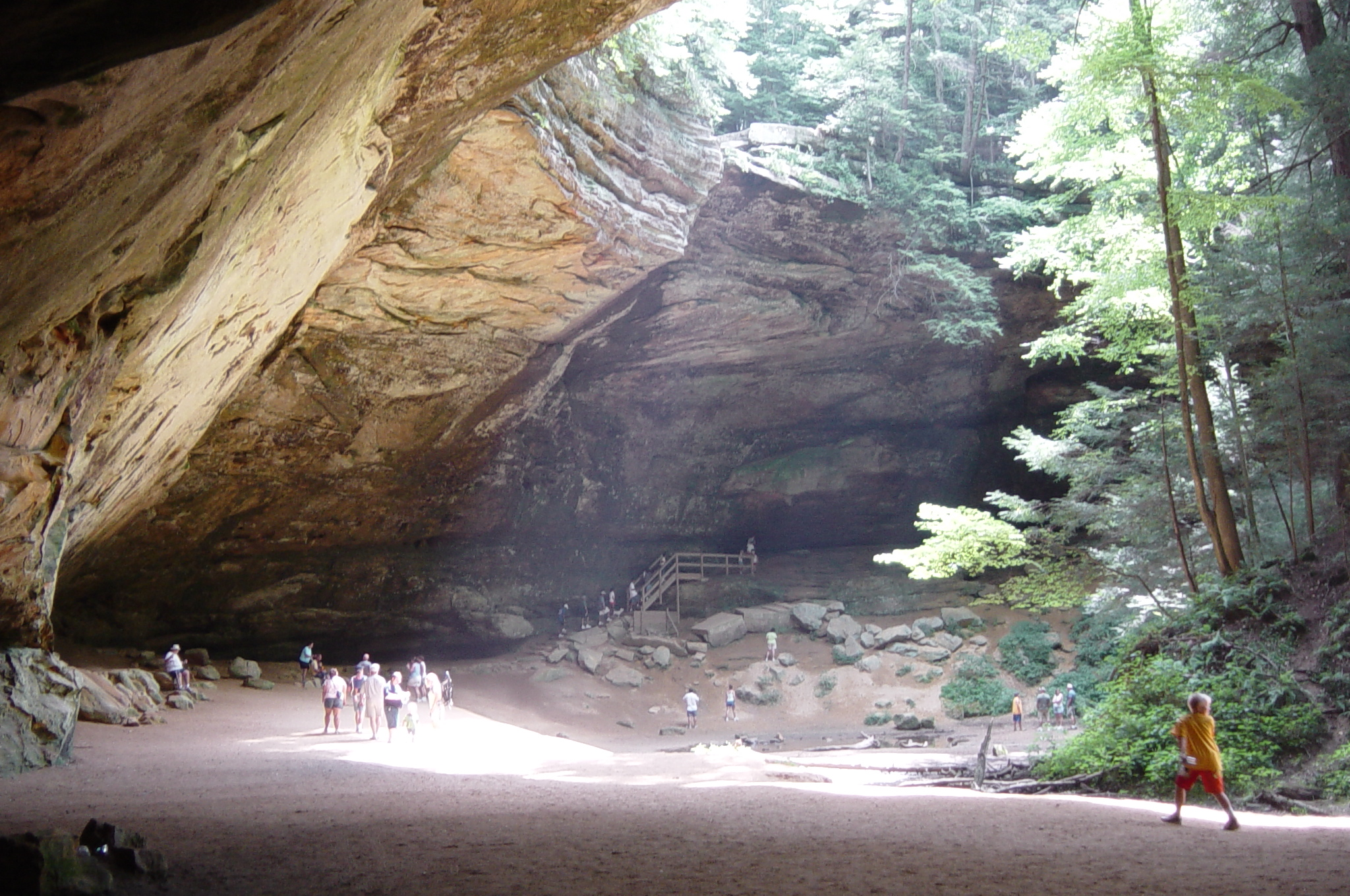
- The popular Ash Cave, part of Hocking Hills State Park

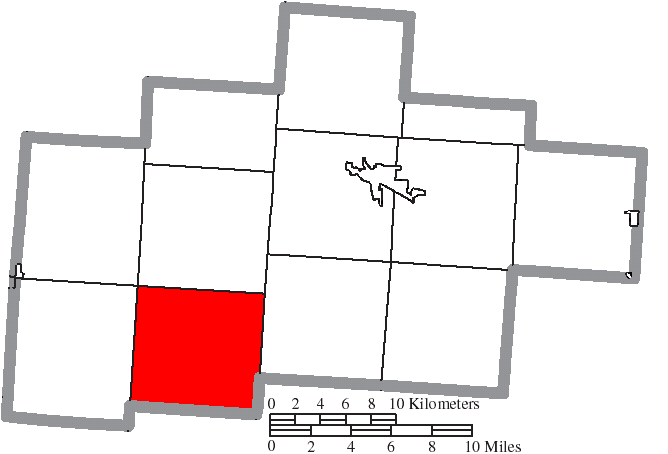
- Location of Benton Township in Hocking County
- Coordinates: 39°24′36″N 82°34′47″W
- Country: United States
- State: Ohio
- County: Hocking

Area
  - Total: 37.8 sq mi (97.9 km^{2})
  - Land: 37.7 sq mi (97.7 km^{2})
  - Water: 0.077 sq mi (0.2 km^{2})
- Elevation: 928 ft (283 m)

Population (2020)
  - Total: 780
  - Density: 21/sq mi (8.0/km^{2})
- Time zone: UTC-5 (Eastern (EST))
  - Summer (DST): UTC-4 (EDT)
- FIPS code: 39-05578
- GNIS feature ID: 1086316

Benton Township is one of the eleven townships of Hocking County, Ohio, United States. As of the 2020 census the population was 780.

== Geography ==
Located in the southwestern part of the county, it borders the following townships:

- Laurel Township - north
- Washington Township - northeast
- Swan Township, Vinton County - south
- Jackson Township, Vinton County - southeast
- Salt Creek Township - west
- Perry Township - northwest corner

No municipalities are located in Benton Township, although the unincorporated community of South Bloomingville lies in the central part of the township.

Situated in the heart of the Hocking Hills region, Benton Township includes much of Hocking Hills State Park, including the popular Old Man's Cave and Ash Cave.

== Name and history ==
Statewide, other Benton Townships are located in Monroe, Ottawa, Paulding, and Pike counties.

== Government ==
The township is governed by a three-member board of trustees, who are elected in November of odd-numbered years to a four-year term beginning on the following January 1. Two are elected in the year after the presidential election and one is elected in the year before it. There is also an elected township fiscal officer, who serves a four-year term beginning on April 1 of the year after the election, which is held in November of the year before the presidential election. Vacancies in the fiscal officership or on the board of trustees are filled by the remaining trustees.
