= Laurel Township, Hocking County, Ohio =

Township in Ohio, US

- Township
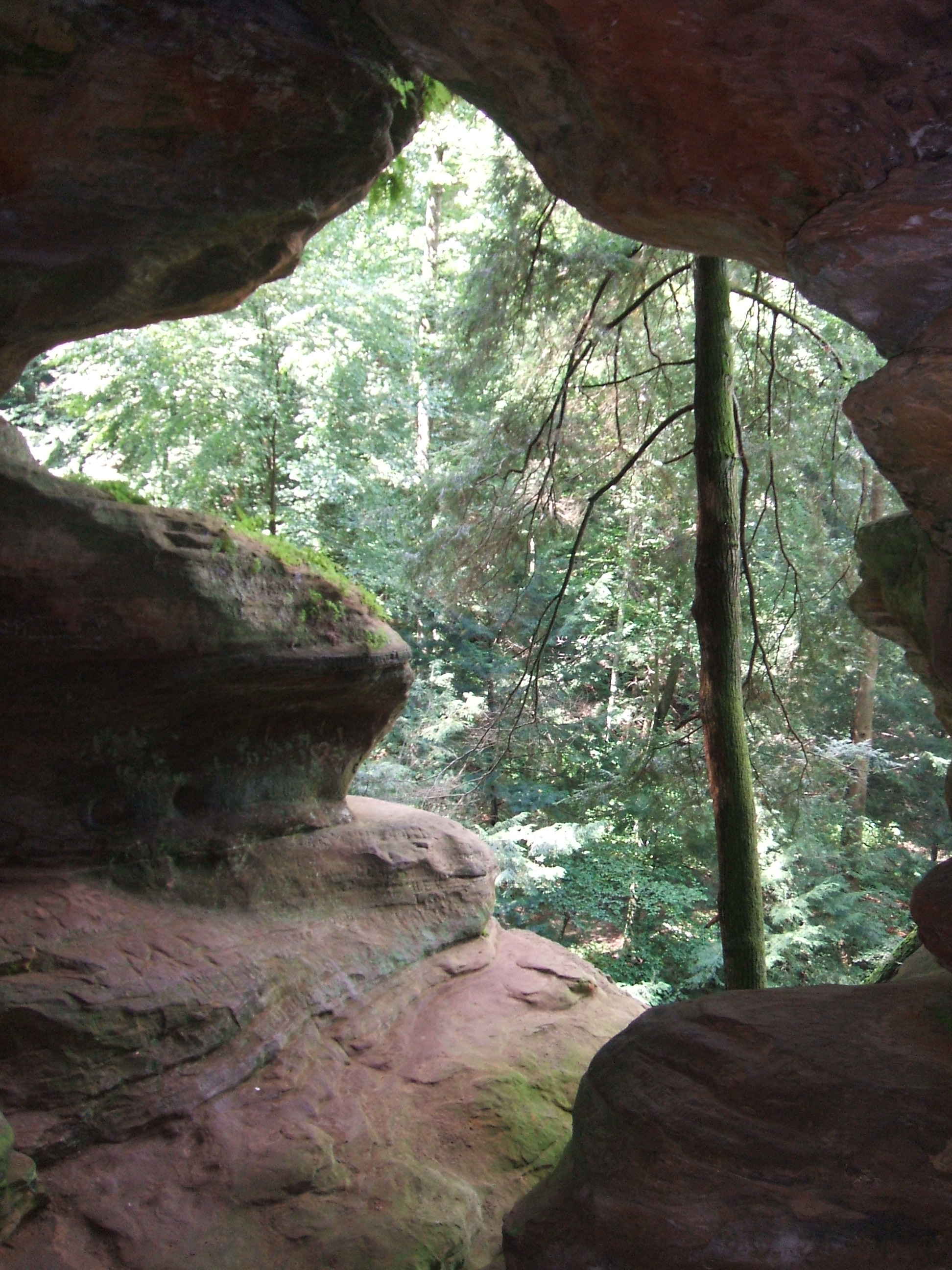
- Rock House at Hocking Hills State Park

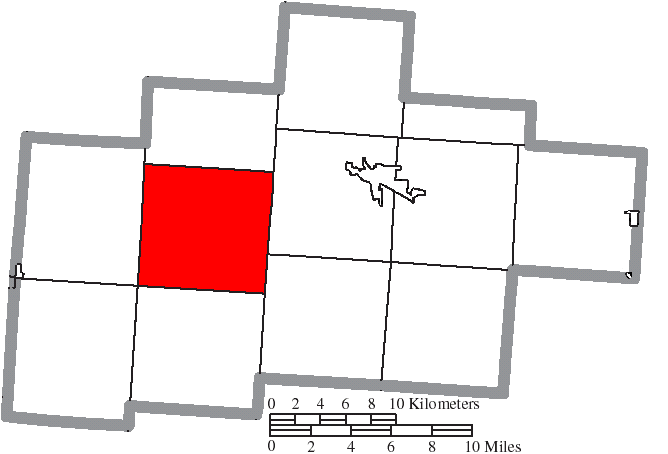
- Location of Laurel Township in Hocking County
- Coordinates: 39°30′44″N 82°35′9″W
- Country: United States
- State: Ohio
- County: Hocking

Area
  - Total: 38.3 sq mi (99.3 km^{2})
  - Land: 38.3 sq mi (99.2 km^{2})
  - Water: 0.039 sq mi (0.1 km^{2})
- Elevation: 1,119 ft (341 m)

Population (2020)
  - Total: 1,042
  - Density: 27.2/sq mi (10.5/km^{2})
- Time zone: UTC-5 (Eastern (EST))
  - Summer (DST): UTC-4 (EDT)
- FIPS code: 39-42056
- GNIS feature ID: 1086320

Laurel Township is one of the eleven townships of Hocking County, Ohio, United States. As of the 2020 census the population was 1,042.

== Geography ==
Located in the western part of the county, it borders the following townships:

- Good Hope Township - north
- Falls Township (southwestern portion) - northeast
- Washington Township - southeast
- Benton Township - south
- Salt Creek Township - southwest
- Perry Township - west

No municipalities are located in Laurel Township.

== Name and history ==
Laurel Township was named from the mountain-laurel native to the area.

It is the only Laurel Township statewide.

== Government ==
The township is governed by a three-member board of trustees, who are elected in November of odd-numbered years to a four-year term beginning on the following January 1. Two are elected in the year after the presidential election and one is elected in the year before it. There is also an elected township fiscal officer, who serves a four-year term beginning on April 1 of the year after the election, which is held in November of the year before the presidential election. Vacancies in the fiscal officership or on the board of trustees are filled by the remaining trustees.
