= Ohio Scenic Byway =

Scenic byways in the US state of Ohio

Ohio Scenic Byways
- Highway marker until 2022

System information
- Formed: September 16, 1998

Highway names
- Interstates: Interstate X (I-X)
- US Highways: U.S. Route X (US X)
- State: State Route X (SR X)

System links
- Ohio State Highway System; Interstate; US; State; Scenic

An Ohio Scenic Byway can be any Interstate, US or state route, county road, municipal street, or township road in the state of Ohio as designated by the director of transportation.

== Byways ==
List of Ohio Scenic Byways
Name	Description	Designated	Length (mi)	Length (km)	Ref
Amish Country Byway	Follows many state highways in Holmes County, connecting Amish communities.	March 1998	164	264	
Appalachian Byway	Formerly known as the Morgan County Scenic Byway, it was extended in 2018 to cover three more counties in the Appalachian region. The byway consists of SR 78 from Nelsonville to Clarington and SR 284 from The Wilds to Cumberland.	1999	115	185	
Big Darby Plains Scenic Byway	Follows multiple county and state routes around Big Darby Creek, a scenic river.	2007	47	76	
Covered Bridge Scenic Byway	Byway follows SR 26 from Marietta to Woodsfield, inside Wayne National Forest.	May 1990	35	56	
Drovers' Trail Scenic Byway	Follows SR 800 from Barnesville to Hendrysburg and SR 147 from Barnesville to Bellaire.	September 2003	37	60	
Gateway to Amish Country	Consists of US 62 and SR 514 in Knox County, connecting to the Amish Country Byway.	2000	30	48	
Granville Scenic Byway	The byway starts at SR 37 at James Road, and continues north through the village of Granville along SR 661, ending north of Cambria Road.	October 2016	10	16	
Heritage Corridors of Bath	Follows multiple county routes within Bath Township of Summit County, connecting Hale Farm and Village, Bath Nature Preserve, and the Cuyahoga Valley National Park.	2000	39	63	
Historic National Road	Follows US 40 within the state.	2000	225	362	
Hocking Hills Scenic Byway	Follows SR 374 in its entirety from Hocking Hills State Park to US 33 at Rockbridge. Also includes segments of SR 56 and SR 664, creating a loop at the southern terminus.	May 2004	26.4	42.5	
Jefferson Township Scenic Byway	Contains county routes and township roads inside Jefferson Township, Franklin County.	2003	15	24	
Johnny Appleseed Historic Byway	Contains SR 39 from Mansfield to Loudonville and SR 603 from SR 95 to Mifflin. The routes link properties formerly owned by Johnny Appleseed.	March 2017	30	48	
Lake Erie Coastal Ohio Trail	Follows various state routes along the south shore of Lake Erie.	December 2004	293	472	
Land of the Cross-Tipped Churches	Byway travels through a large concentration of Catholic churches in Mercer County, Ohio and Auglaize County, Ohio.	1998	38.4	61.8	
Lincoln Highway Historic Byway	Follows the 1928 alignment of Lincoln Highway, from the Indiana state line to East Liverpool.	2004	241	388	
Lower Valley Pike Scenic Byway	The scenic byway follows Lower Valley Pike from I-70 near Fairborn to US 40 near Springfield. The road was one of the first direct routes to Dayton.	May 2004	11	18	
Maumee Valley Scenic Byway	Follows the Maumee River from Defiance to Toledo.	2000	59	95	
Miami and Erie Canal Scenic Byway		2000	50	80	
North Ridge Scenic Byway		2007	8.8	14.2	
Ohio & Erie Canalway Scenic Byway		June 2005	110	180	
Ohio River Scenic Byway	Located along the Ohio River along US 50, US 52, and SR 7.	June 1998	452	727	
Old Mill Stream Scenic Byway		2006	52	84	
Presidential Pathways Scenic Byway		June 2009	52	84	
Scenic Olentangy Heritage Corridor	Byway located on SR 315 from I-270 to US 23.	2000	10.5	16.9	
Scenic Scioto Heritage Trail		2007	99	159	
Tappan-Moravian Trail Scenic Byway		1997	55	89	
Wally Road Scenic Byway		August 2004	10.4	16.7	
Welsh Scenic Byway	Located on US 35 in between SR 32 with SR 124 and the Ohio River.	2000	34	55	
