= Logan, Ohio =

- City
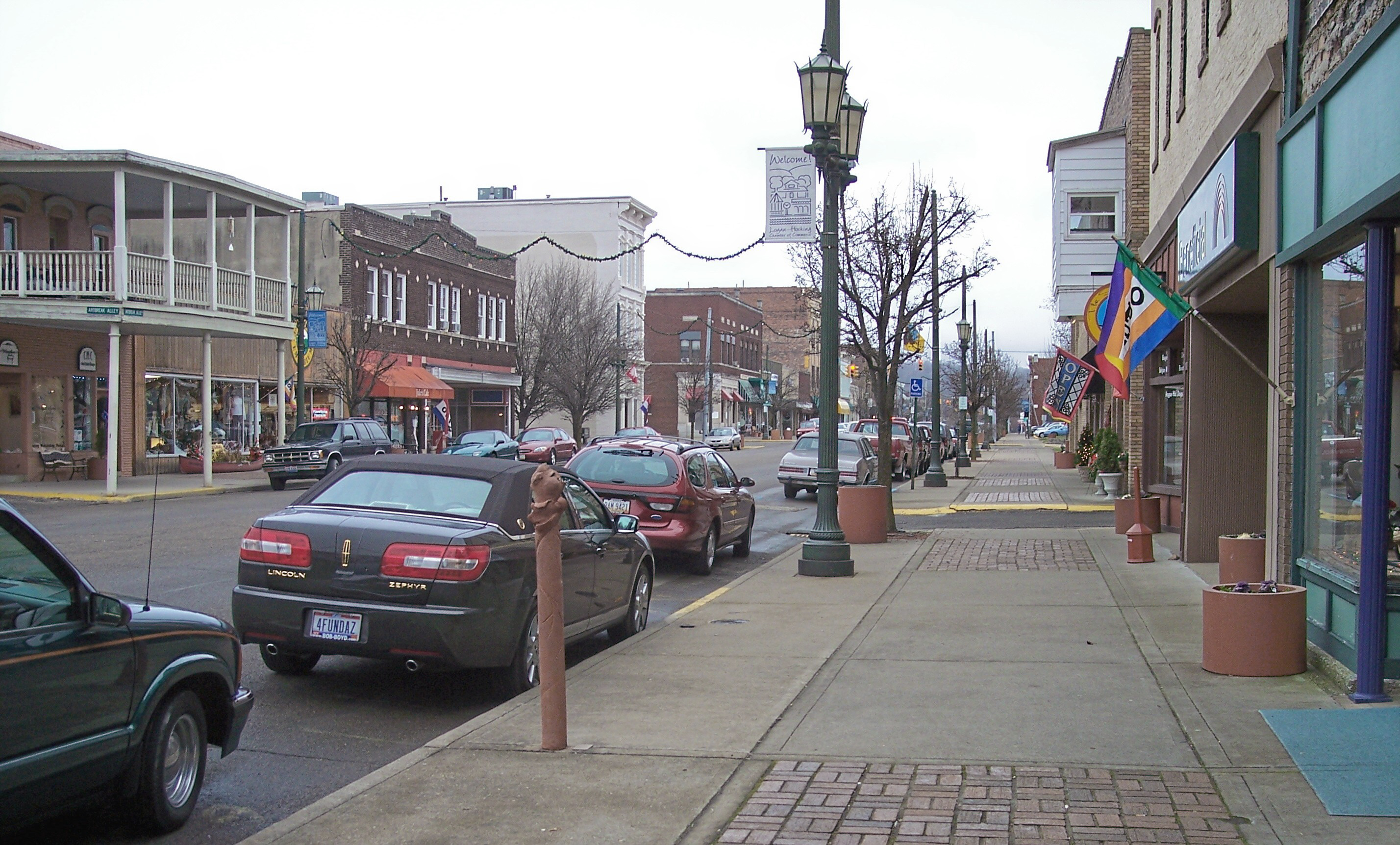
- West Main Street in downtown Logan in 2006
- Interactive map of Logan, Ohio
- Location within Ohio Location within the United States
- Coordinates: 39°32′04″N 82°23′26″W
- Country: United States
- State: Ohio
- County: Hocking

Government
  - Mayor: Greg Fraunfelter

Area
  - Total: 4.93 sq mi (12.77 km^{2})
  - Land: 4.79 sq mi (12.41 km^{2})
  - Water: 0.14 sq mi (0.36 km^{2})
- Elevation: 742 ft (226 m)

Population (2020)
  - Total: 7,296
  - Density: 1,522.8/sq mi (587.96/km^{2})
- Time zone: UTC-5 (Eastern (EST))
  - Summer (DST): UTC-4 (EDT)
- ZIP code: 43138
- Area code: 740
- FIPS code: 39-44632
- GNIS feature ID: 2395743
- Website: Official website

Logan is a city in Hocking County, Ohio, United States, and its county seat. It is located along the Hocking River about 43 miles (69 km) southeast of Columbus. The population was 7,296 at the 2020 census.

== History ==
Residents named the town in honor of Chief Logan of the Mingo people. He and his band lived in this area at the time of European-American settlement. Ohio Governor Thomas Worthington laid out the village in 1816.

Logan was incorporated as a city in 1839.

Logan was the first city in the state of Ohio to install a double roundabout. Located at the interchange of Ohio State Route 664 and U.S. Route 33, the roundabouts were officially opened to traffic on December 4, 2013.

== Geography ==
According to the United States Census Bureau, the city has a total area of 4.93 square miles (12.77 km^{2}), of which 4.79 square miles (12.41 km^{2}) is land and 0.14 square miles (0.36 km^{2}) is water.

=== Climate ===
Climate data for Logan, Ohio (1991–2020 normals, extremes 1897–1900, 1992–2004, 2010–present)
Month	Jan	Feb	Mar	Apr	May	Jun	Jul	Aug	Sep	Oct	Nov	Dec	Year
Record high °F (°C)	73 (23)	79 (26)	89 (32)	94 (34)	98 (37)	99 (37)	103 (39)	103 (39)	107 (42)	95 (35)	82 (28)	73 (23)	107 (42)
Mean daily maximum °F (°C)	39.0 (3.9)	42.3 (5.7)	52.0 (11.1)	65.0 (18.3)	73.8 (23.2)	81.0 (27.2)	84.5 (29.2)	83.5 (28.6)	78.3 (25.7)	66.6 (19.2)	53.7 (12.1)	43.3 (6.3)	63.6 (17.6)
Daily mean °F (°C)	28.8 (−1.8)	31.6 (−0.2)	39.9 (4.4)	51.1 (10.6)	60.9 (16.1)	69.0 (20.6)	73.0 (22.8)	71.4 (21.9)	65.2 (18.4)	53.2 (11.8)	41.9 (5.5)	33.3 (0.7)	51.6 (10.9)
Mean daily minimum °F (°C)	18.7 (−7.4)	20.8 (−6.2)	27.9 (−2.3)	37.2 (2.9)	48.1 (8.9)	56.9 (13.8)	61.4 (16.3)	59.3 (15.2)	52.2 (11.2)	39.8 (4.3)	30.1 (−1.1)	23.2 (−4.9)	39.6 (4.2)
Record low °F (°C)	−37 (−38)	−29 (−34)	−9 (−23)	13 (−11)	21 (−6)	37 (3)	45 (7)	43 (6)	29 (−2)	20 (−7)	10 (−12)	−11 (−24)	−37 (−38)
Average precipitation inches (mm)	3.24 (82)	2.89 (73)	3.69 (94)	4.13 (105)	4.27 (108)	4.74 (120)	4.74 (120)	3.55 (90)	2.94 (75)	3.08 (78)	2.78 (71)	3.13 (80)	43.18 (1,097)
Average precipitation days (≥ 0.01 in)	11.1	9.4	10.7	11.2	13.5	11.8	11.4	9.6	8.2	9.5	9.4	11.1	126.9
Source: NOAA

== Demographics ==
Historical population
Census	Pop.	Note	%±
1820	100		—
1850	826		—
1860	1,489		80.3%
1870	1,827		22.7%
1880	2,666		45.9%
1890	3,119		17.0%
1900	3,480		11.6%
1910	4,850		39.4%
1920	5,493		13.3%
1930	6,080		10.7%
1940	6,177		1.6%
1950	5,972		−3.3%
1960	6,417		7.5%
1970	6,269		−2.3%
1980	6,557		4.6%
1990	6,725		2.6%
2000	6,704		−0.3%
2010	7,152		6.7%
2020	7,296		2.0%

=== 2020 census ===
As of the 2020 census, Logan had a population of 7,296. The median age was 38.7 years; 23.9% of residents were under the age of 18 and 19.2% of residents were 65 years of age or older. For every 100 females there were 87.0 males, and for every 100 females age 18 and over there were 83.1 males age 18 and over.

99.0% of residents lived in urban areas, while 1.0% lived in rural areas.

There were 3,045 households in Logan, of which 29.4% had children under the age of 18 living in them. Of all households, 37.3% were married-couple households, 18.5% were households with a male householder and no spouse or partner present, and 34.3% were households with a female householder and no spouse or partner present. About 35.0% of all households were made up of individuals and 16.2% had someone living alone who was 65 years of age or older.

There were 3,263 housing units, of which 6.7% were vacant. The homeowner vacancy rate was 1.7% and the rental vacancy rate was 4.3%.

Racial composition as of the 2020 census
Race	Number	Percent
White	6,840	93.8%
Black or African American	56	0.8%
American Indian and Alaska Native	16	0.2%
Asian	13	0.2%
Native Hawaiian and Other Pacific Islander	0	0.0%
Some other race	35	0.5%
Two or more races	336	4.6%
Hispanic or Latino (of any race)	93	1.3%

=== 2010 census ===
As of the census of 2010, there were 7,152 people, 2,982 households, and 1,831 families residing in the city. The population density was 1,493.1 inhabitants per square mile (576.5/km^{2}). There were 3,374 housing units at an average density of 704.4 per square mile (272.0/km^{2}). The racial makeup of the city was 97.5% White, 0.8% African American, 0.3% Native American, 0.2% Asian, 0.3% from other races, and 0.9% from two or more races. Hispanic or Latino of any race were 0.8% of the population.

There were 2,982 households, of which 31.3% had children under the age of 18 living with them, 41.4% were married couples living together, 15.1% had a female householder with no husband present, 4.9% had a male householder with no wife present, and 38.6% were non-families. 33.5% of all households were made up of individuals, and 15.1% had someone living alone who was 65 years of age or older. The average household size was 2.34 and the average family size was 2.95.

The median age in the city was 38 years. 24.3% of residents were under the age of 18; 9.1% were between the ages of 18 and 24; 24.6% were from 25 to 44; 24.5% were from 45 to 64; and 17.5% were 65 years of age or older. The gender makeup of the city was 46.4% male and 53.6% female.

=== 2000 census ===
As of the census of 2000, there were 6,704 people, 2,790 households, and 1,768 families residing in the city. The population density was 2,175.2 inhabitants per square mile (839.8/km^{2}). There were 2,948 housing units at an average density of 956.5/sq mi (369.3/km^{2}). The racial makeup of the city was 97.87% White, 0.57% African American, 0.39% Native American, 0.06% Asian, 0.01% from other races, and 1.10% from two or more races. Hispanic or Latino of any race were 0.46% of the population.

There were 2,790 households, out of which 30.3% had children under the age of 18 living with them, 46.2% were married couples living together, 13.2% had a female householder with no husband present, and 36.6% were non-families. 32.4% of all households were made up of individuals, and 16.5% had someone living alone who was 65 years of age or older. The average household size was 2.33 and the average family size was 2.94.

In the city, the population was spread out, with 24.4% under the age of 18, 9.6% from 18 to 24, 24.9% from 25 to 44, 21.8% from 45 to 64, and 19.3% who were 65 years of age or older. The median age was 39 years. For every 100 females, there were 84.9 males. For every 100 females age 18 and over, there were 81.0 males.

The median income for a household in the city was $29,691, and the median income for a family was $38,143. Males had a median income of $31,875 versus $23,738 for females. The per capita income for the city was $15,836. About 13.0% of families and 17.7% of the population were below the poverty line, including 20.9% of those under age 18 and 16.8% of those age 65 or over.

== Arts and culture ==
Every year, on the Thursday before Father's Day weekend, the downtown streets of Logan, Ohio come alive with the celebration of the washboard, as a musical instrument. Logan is the home of the Columbus Washboard Company, the only remaining washboard manufacturing company in the U.S. Washboards continue to be used as instruments of laundry today in some parts of the world and serve decoratively in many homes. The Washboard Music Festival celebrates the washboard's role as the source of "toe-tappin'" rhythm found in jug bands and Dixieland groups throughout the United States.

On the first Saturday of October, Logan High School hosts its annual marching band festival, the Logan Fall Festival of Bands. Bands who accept the invitation to perform at the festival entertain spectators with their halftime routines, some specially choreographed for the festival itself.

During the last week of July, the Insea Sound Shop of Nelsonville, Ohio, holds the annual Diamond Music Festival at the Isaac Walton Clubhouse, situated on the banks of Lake Logan.

The Hocking Hills Regional Welcome Center just outside of the city contains the Pencil Sharpener Museum, which is reputed to be the largest collection of pencil sharpeners in America.

== Government ==
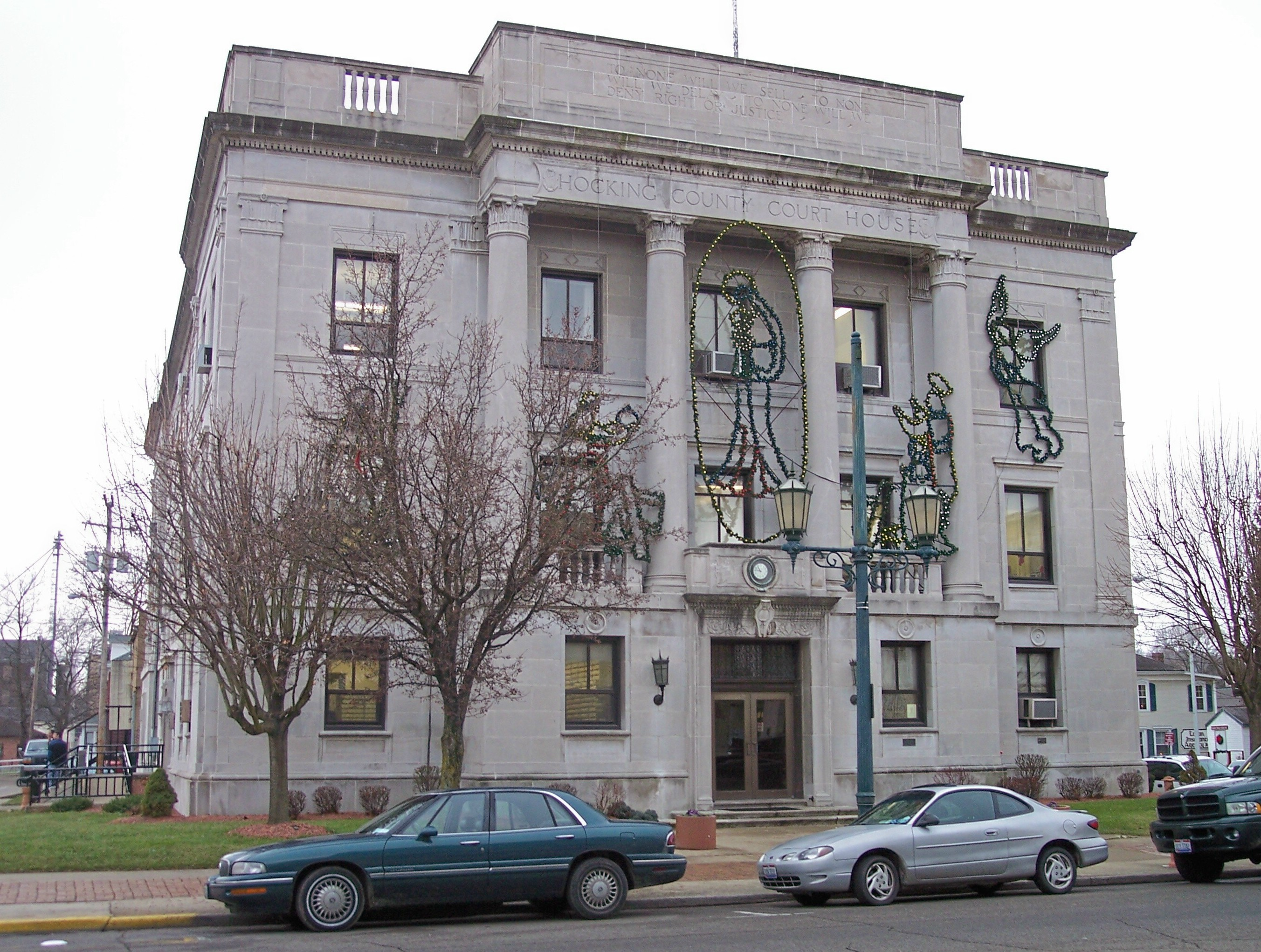
Hocking County Courthouse

The mayor of Logan is Republican Greg Fraunfelter, who began a four-year term in January 2016 and was re-elected in 2019 and again in 2023.

== Education ==
Logan-Hocking Schools operates five elementary schools, one middle school, and Logan High School. The Logan-Hocking County District Library, a public lending library, is located in Logan with a branch in Laurelville.

== Notable people ==
- Estel Crabtree, MLB player for the Cincinnati Reds and St. Louis Cardinals
- Curtis Scaparrotti, Supreme Allied Commander Europe and commander of the United States European Command
- Katie Smith, WNBA player and Olympic gold medalist

== Notable events ==
- Murders of Annette Cooper and Todd Schultz
