= Laurelville, Ohio =

- Village
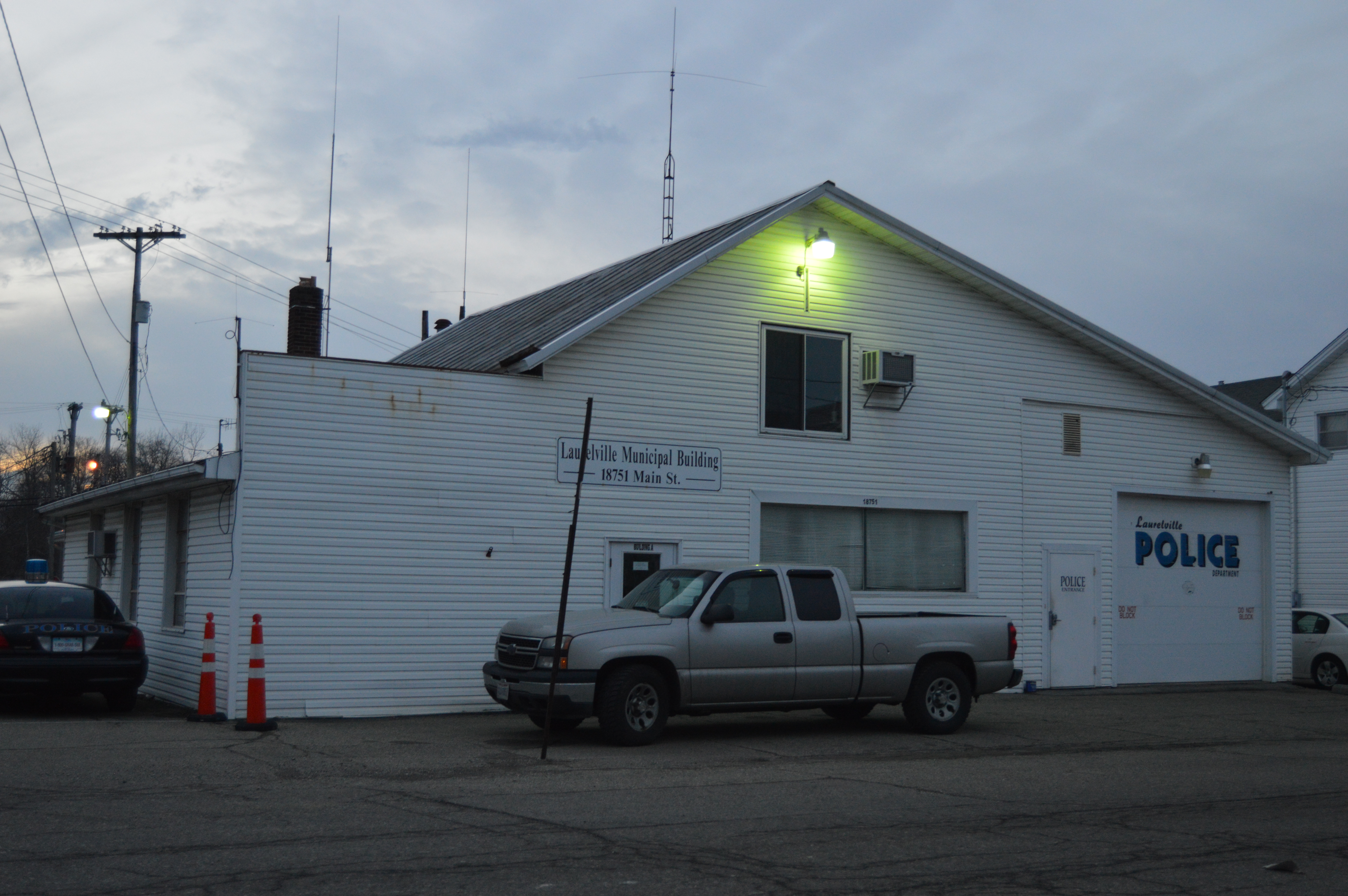
- Village hall

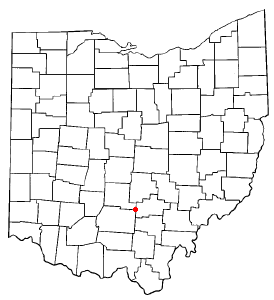
- Location of Laurelville in Ohio
- Coordinates: 39°28′35″N 82°44′13″W
- Country: United States
- State: Ohio
- County: Hocking

Area
  - Total: 0.31 sq mi (0.80 km^{2})
  - Land: 0.31 sq mi (0.80 km^{2})
  - Water: 0.00 sq mi (0 km^{2})
- Elevation: 725 ft (221 m)

Population (2020)
  - Total: 512
  - Density: 1,700/sq mi (640/km^{2})
- Time zone: UTC-5 (Eastern (EST))
  - Summer (DST): UTC-4 (EDT)
- ZIP code: 43135
- Area code: 740
- GNIS feature ID: 1064941
- Website: https://laurelvilleoh.com/

Laurelville is a village in Hocking County, Ohio, United States. The population was 512 at the 2020 census. It lies in the scenic Hocking Hills region and is known for its proximity to natural attractions and historic earthworks.

== History ==
Laurelville was established in 1871 by early settlers William A. Albin and Jacob Riegel, who planned the area as a center for commerce and transportation. The village was named after the native mountain laurel plant that grew abundantly in the surrounding hills.

The town quickly grew with the arrival of the M&C Railroad and became a stop for travelers and merchants. Early industries included sawmills, dry goods stores, and small manufacturers. Laurelville also became known for its fairs and served as a social center for western Hocking County.

== Geography ==
Laurelville lies along Salt Creek in the unglaciated Allegheny Plateau, surrounded by forested hills and sandstone cliffs. The village covers a total area of 0.31 square miles (0.80 km²), all land.

== Demographics ==
As of the 2020 census, Laurelville had a population of 512 residents. The village has historically had a predominantly white population, with modest economic activity based in retail, tourism, and agriculture.

== Economy and community ==
Laurelville’s economy revolves around small businesses, local agriculture, and tourism. The village features antique stores, diners, seasonal produce markets, and serves as a rest stop for visitors to the Hocking Hills.

While the Laurelville Post Office remains in operation, the local elementary school was demolished in the early 2020s after district consolidation.

== Education ==
Public education is provided by the Logan Elm Local School District. Local students attend schools outside the village after the closure of Laurelville Elementary.

The community is served by mobile library services and regional branches of the Logan-Hocking Public Library.

== Landmarks ==
- Karshner Mound – Adena mound listed on the National Register of Historic Places
- George Deffenbaugh Mound
- Edith Ross Mound

These mounds represent some of the earliest earthworks in the region, believed to be ceremonial sites constructed by prehistoric Native American cultures.

== See also ==
- Hocking Hills State Park
- Karshner Mound
- Zaleski State Forest
