= Hocking County, Ohio =

County in Ohio, United States

- County
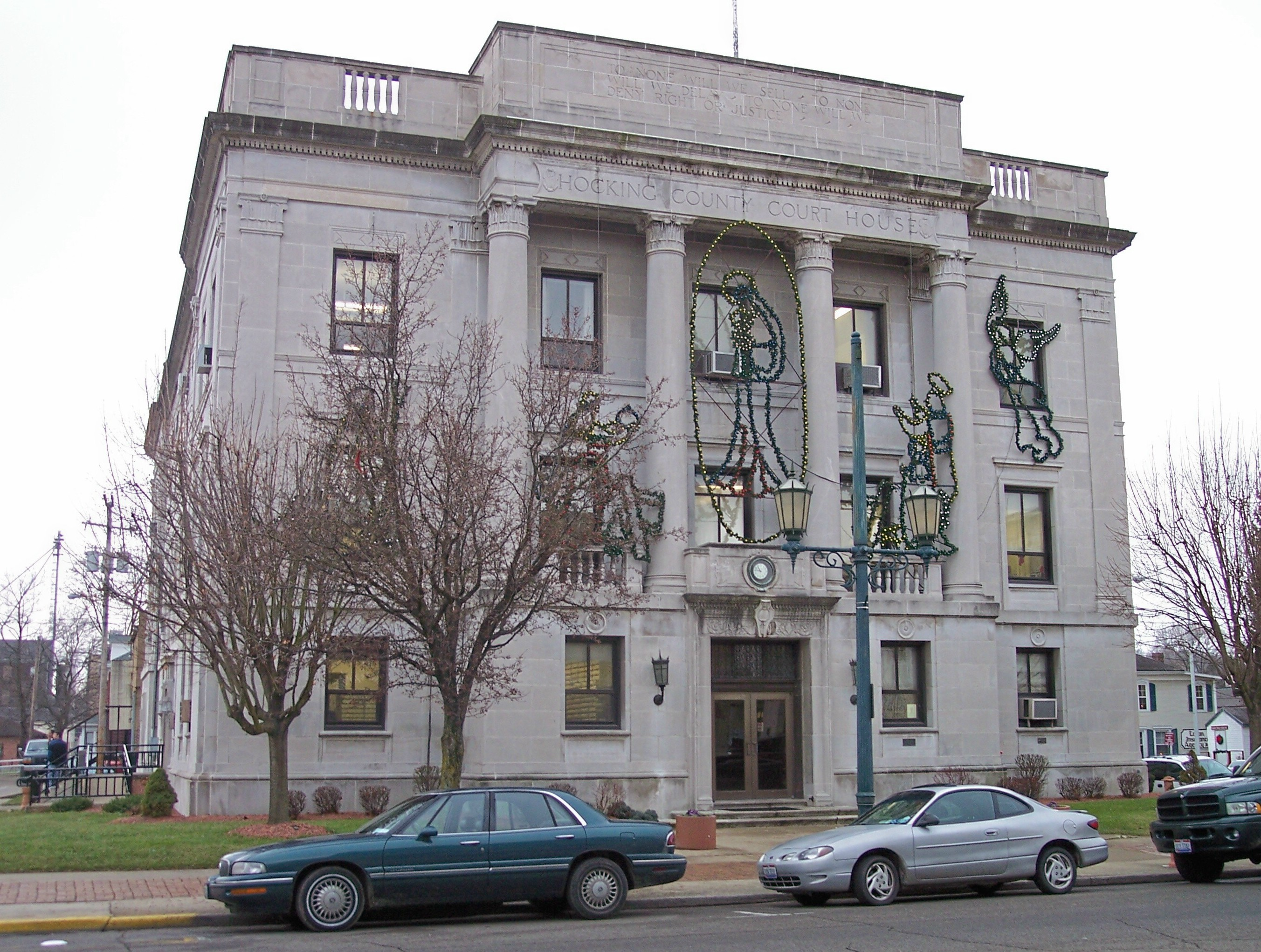
- Hocking County Courthouse

- Flag Seal

- Location within the U.S. state of Ohio
- Coordinates: 39.50°N 82.48°W
- Country: United States
- State: Ohio
- Founded: March 1, 1818
- Named for: Hocking River, perhaps from the Lenape language for "bottle river"
- Seat: Logan
- Largest city: Logan

Area
  - Total: 424 sq mi (1,100 km^{2})
  - Land: 421 sq mi (1,090 km^{2})
  - Water: 2.3 sq mi (6.0 km^{2}) 0.5%

Population (2020)
  - Total: 28,050
  - Estimate (2025): 27,512 ▼
  - Density: 66/sq mi (25/km^{2})
- Time zone: UTC−5 (Eastern)
  - Summer (DST): UTC−4 (EDT)
- Congressional district: 2nd
- Website: www.co.hocking.oh.us

Hocking County is a county located in the U.S. state of Ohio. As of the 2020 census, the population was 28,050. Its county seat is Logan. The county was organized on March 1, 1818, from land previously included in Athens, Fairfield, and Ross counties. Its name is from the Hocking River, the origins of which are disputed but is said to be a Delaware Indian word meaning "bottle river". Hocking County is included in the Columbus, OH Metropolitan Statistical Area.

== Geography ==
According to the U.S. Census Bureau, the county has a total area of 424 square miles (1,100 km^{2}), of which 421 square miles (1,090 km^{2}) is land and 2.3 square miles (6.0 km^{2}) (0.5%) is water.

=== Waterways ===
The major waterway of Hocking County is the Hocking River, which flows roughly from WNW to ESE, arising in Fairfield County and flowing from Hocking County into Athens County. This river drains about half the county. To the southwest, much of the rest of the county is drained by Salt Creek, which flows from there into Vinton County. A small part of the southeastern county is drained by Raccoon Creek, which also flows into Vinton County. The easternmost area of the county is within the Monday Creek watershed. A small area in the north of the county is drained by Rush Creek.

=== Adjacent counties ===
- Perry County (northeast)
- Athens County (southeast)
- Vinton County (south)
- Ross County (southwest)
- Pickaway County (west)
- Fairfield County (northwest)

=== National protected area ===
- Wayne National Forest (part)

== Demographics ==
Historical population
Census	Pop.	Note	%±
1820	2,130		—
1830	4,008		88.2%
1840	9,741		143.0%
1850	14,119		44.9%
1860	17,057		20.8%
1870	17,925		5.1%
1880	21,126		17.9%
1890	22,658		7.3%
1900	24,398		7.7%
1910	23,650		−3.1%
1920	23,291		−1.5%
1930	20,407		−12.4%
1940	21,504		5.4%
1950	19,520		−9.2%
1960	20,168		3.3%
1970	20,322		0.8%
1980	24,304		19.6%
1990	25,533		5.1%
2000	28,241		10.6%
2010	29,380		4.0%
2020	28,050		−4.5%
2025 (est.)	27,512	▼	−1.9%
U.S. Decennial Census; 1790–1960 1900–1990; 1990–2000 2020

=== 2020 census ===
As of the 2020 census, the county had a population of 28,050. The median age was 43.6 years. 21.8% of residents were under the age of 18 and 19.5% of residents were 65 years of age or older. For every 100 females there were 97.1 males, and for every 100 females age 18 and over there were 95.3 males age 18 and over.

The racial makeup of the county was 94.8% White, 0.5% Black or African American, 0.2% American Indian and Alaska Native, 0.3% Asian, <0.1% Native Hawaiian and Pacific Islander, 0.3% from some other race, and 3.9% from two or more races. Hispanic or Latino residents of any race comprised 0.8% of the population.

29.4% of residents lived in urban areas, while 70.6% lived in rural areas.

There were 11,429 households in the county, of which 28.2% had children under the age of 18 living in them. Of all households, 49.6% were married-couple households, 17.9% were households with a male householder and no spouse or partner present, and 24.0% were households with a female householder and no spouse or partner present. About 27.6% of all households were made up of individuals and 13.1% had someone living alone who was 65 years of age or older.

There were 12,987 housing units, of which 12.0% were vacant. Among occupied housing units, 73.1% were owner-occupied and 26.9% were renter-occupied. The homeowner vacancy rate was 1.0% and the rental vacancy rate was 6.8%.

=== Racial and ethnic composition ===
Hocking County, Ohio – Racial and ethnic composition Note: the US Census treats Hispanic/Latino as an ethnic category. This table excludes Latinos from the racial categories and assigns them to a separate category. Hispanics/Latinos may be of any race.
Race / ethnicity (NH = Non-Hispanic)	Pop 1980	Pop 1990	Pop 2000	Pop 2010	Pop 2020	% 1980	% 1990	% 2000	% 2010	% 2020
White alone (NH)	24,026	25,118	27,439	28,509	26,502	98.86%	98.37%	97.16%	97.04%	94.48%
Black or African American alone (NH)	117	234	257	215	139	0.48%	0.92%	0.91%	0.73%	0.50%
Native American or Alaska Native alone (NH)	13	55	78	88	45	0.05%	0.22%	0.28%	0.30%	0.16%
Asian alone (NH)	38	24	22	47	71	0.16%	0.09%	0.08%	0.16%	0.25%
Native Hawaiian or Pacific Islander alone (NH)	x	x	0	3	0	x	x	0.00%	0.01%	0.00%
Other race alone (NH)	24	9	15	15	53	0.10%	0.04%	0.05%	0.05%	0.19%
Mixed race or Multiracial (NH)	x	x	306	305	1,008	x	x	1.08%	1.04%	3.59%
Hispanic or Latino (any race)	86	93	124	198	232	0.35%	0.36%	0.44%	0.67%	0.83%
Total	24,304	25,533	28,241	29,380	28,050	100.00%	100.00%	100.00%	100.00%	100.00%

=== 2010 census ===
As of the 2010 United States census, there were 29,380 people, 11,369 households, and 7,948 families living in the county. The population density was 69.7 inhabitants per square mile (26.9/km^{2}). There were 13,417 housing units at an average density of 31.8 per square mile (12.3/km^{2}). The racial makeup of the county was 97.5% white, 0.7% black or African American, 0.3% American Indian, 0.2% Asian, 0.2% from other races, and 1.1% from two or more races. Those of Hispanic or Latino origin made up 0.7% of the population. In terms of ancestry, 25.3% were German, 15.0% were American, 14.1% were Irish, and 9.0% were English.

Of the 11,369 households, 32.3% had children under the age of 18 living with them, 53.9% were married couples living together, 10.7% had a female householder with no husband present, 30.1% were non-families, and 24.8% of all households were made up of individuals. The average household size was 2.52 and the average family size was 2.98. The median age was 40.9 years.

The median income for a household in the county was $39,586 and the median income for a family was $48,796. Males had a median income of $39,219 versus $30,371 for females. The per capita income for the county was $19,048. About 12.3% of families and 15.3% of the population were below the poverty line, including 20.7% of those under age 18 and 10.8% of those age 65 or over.

=== 2000 census ===
As of the census of 2000, there were 28,241 people, 10,843 households, and 7,828 families living in the county. The population density was 67 inhabitants per square mile (26/km^{2}). There were 12,141 housing units at an average density of 29/sq mi (11/km^{2}). The racial makeup of the county was 97.32% White, 0.92% Black or African American, 0.28% Native American, 0.08% Asian, 0.08% from other races, and 1.09% from two or more races. 0.68% of the population were Hispanic or Latino of any race.

There were 10,843 households, out of which 33.50% had children under the age of 18 living with them, 58.30% were married couples living together, 9.50% had a female householder with no husband present, and 27.80% were non-families. 23.70% of all households were made up of individuals, and 10.00% had someone living alone who was 65 years of age or older. The average household size was 2.54 and the average family size was 2.98.

In the county, the population was spread out, with 25.50% under the age of 18, 8.10% from 18 to 24, 28.30% from 25 to 44, 25.00% from 45 to 64, and 13.10% who were 65 years of age or older. The median age was 38 years. For every 100 females there were 99.30 males. For every 100 females age 18 and over, there were 97.90 males.

The median income for a household in the county was $34,261, and the median income for a family was $40,888. Males had a median income of $31,951 versus $24,123 for females. The per capita income for the county was $16,095. About 10.30% of families and 13.50% of the population were below the poverty line, including 15.80% of those under age 18 and 14.50% of those age 65 or over.

== Politics ==
Hocking County has been considered to be a swing county in presidential elections as most were won by close margins. Barack Obama came within 105 votes in 2008 and 128 in 2012; Bill Clinton was the last Democrat to win it, in 1996. However, the margins of victory grew during the Donald Trump administration.

United States presidential election results for Hocking County, Ohio
Year	Republican		Democratic		Third party(ies)	
Year	No.	%	No.	%	No.	%
1856	1,092	41.04%	1,454	54.64%	115	4.32%
1860	1,329	40.93%	1,784	54.94%	134	4.13%
1864	1,381	42.30%	1,884	57.70%	0	0.00%
1868	1,369	39.34%	2,111	60.66%	0	0.00%
1872	1,350	41.69%	1,860	57.44%	28	0.86%
1876	1,475	39.47%	2,259	60.45%	3	0.08%
1880	1,830	42.15%	2,422	55.78%	90	2.07%
1884	1,819	41.66%	2,426	55.57%	121	2.77%
1888	2,113	43.47%	2,541	52.27%	207	4.26%
1892	2,034	41.65%	2,522	51.65%	327	6.70%
1896	2,746	46.00%	3,177	53.22%	47	0.79%
1900	2,923	49.58%	2,896	49.13%	76	1.29%
1904	2,979	55.18%	2,304	42.67%	116	2.15%
1908	2,749	47.72%	2,864	49.71%	148	2.57%
1912	1,354	27.02%	2,295	45.79%	1,363	27.19%
1916	2,357	43.45%	2,907	53.59%	161	2.97%
1920	4,335	50.84%	4,082	47.87%	110	1.29%
1924	4,086	50.46%	2,854	35.24%	1,158	14.30%
1928	5,497	67.92%	2,502	30.92%	94	1.16%
1932	3,811	40.77%	5,287	56.56%	250	2.67%
1936	3,960	37.09%	6,580	61.62%	138	1.29%
1940	5,336	48.40%	5,688	51.60%	0	0.00%
1944	4,535	54.63%	3,766	45.37%	0	0.00%
1948	3,733	45.46%	4,462	54.34%	17	0.21%
1952	4,743	54.64%	3,938	45.36%	0	0.00%
1956	4,925	59.63%	3,334	40.37%	0	0.00%
1960	5,262	56.47%	4,057	43.53%	0	0.00%
1964	2,858	32.44%	5,951	67.56%	0	0.00%
1968	3,998	45.94%	3,701	42.53%	1,003	11.53%
1972	5,407	63.67%	2,874	33.84%	211	2.48%
1976	4,114	43.78%	5,126	54.56%	156	1.66%
1980	4,588	52.02%	3,765	42.69%	466	5.28%
1984	6,071	64.16%	3,280	34.66%	112	1.18%
1988	5,426	58.70%	3,706	40.10%	111	1.20%
1992	3,761	35.57%	3,935	37.21%	2,878	27.22%
1996	4,017	38.79%	4,646	44.86%	1,693	16.35%
2000	5,702	53.01%	4,474	41.60%	580	5.39%
2004	6,936	52.55%	6,175	46.78%	88	0.67%
2008	6,364	48.89%	6,259	48.09%	393	3.02%
2012	6,285	49.22%	6,157	48.22%	326	2.55%
2016	8,497	65.72%	3,775	29.20%	657	5.08%
2020	9,737	70.28%	3,880	28.00%	238	1.72%
2024	9,679	71.63%	3,704	27.41%	129	0.95%

United States Senate election results for Hocking County, Ohio1
Year	Republican		Democratic		Third party(ies)	
Year	No.	%	No.	%	No.	%
2024	8,599	64.67%	4,125	31.02%	572	4.30%

== Government ==
=== Hocking County Officials ===
Office	Officeholder	Party
Hocking County Commissioner	Michael Linton	Republican
Hocking County Commissioner	Jason Anthony Donofrio	Republican
Hocking County Commissioner	Andrew Davidson	Republican
Auditor	Christopher Donald Robers	Republican
Clerk of Courts	Rhonda Lynn Wykle	Democratic
Coroner	David Cummin	Republican
Engineer	William Shaw	Democratic
Prosecutor	Jennifer Graham	Republican
Recorder	Teresa Salizzoni	Republican
Sheriff	Lanny North	Republican
Treasurer	Blaine Davidson	Republican

== Communities ==
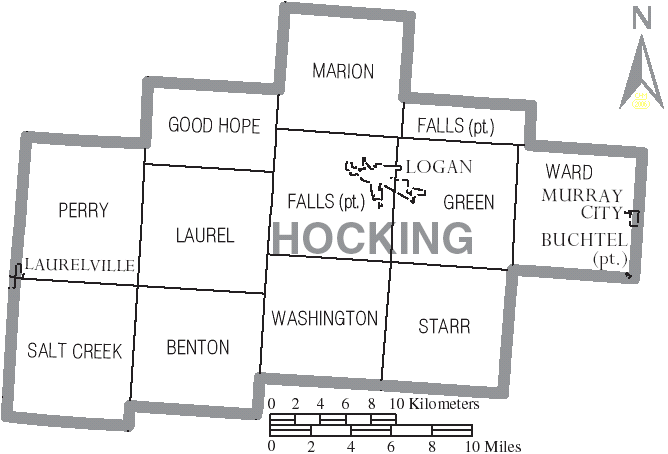
Map of Hocking County with municipal and township boundaries

=== City ===
- Logan (county seat)

=== Villages ===
- Buchtel
- Laurelville
- Murray City

=== Townships ===
- Benton
- Falls
- Good Hope
- Green
- Laurel
- Marion
- Perry
- Salt Creek
- Starr
- Ward
- Washington

=== Census-designated places ===
- Carbon Hill
- Haydenville
- Hide-A-Way Hills
- Rockbridge
- West Logan

=== Unincorporated communities ===
- Ewing
- Ilesboro
- Sand Run
- South Bloomingville
- Union Furnace

== Parks ==
- Hocking Hills State Park

== See also ==
- National Register of Historic Places listings in Hocking County, Ohio
