= National Register of Historic Places listings in Hocking County, Ohio =

Location of Hocking County in Ohio

This is a list of the National Register of Historic Places listings in Hocking County, Ohio.

This is intended to be a complete list of the properties and districts on the National Register of Historic Places in Hocking County, Ohio, United States. The locations of National Register properties and districts for which the latitude and longitude coordinates are included below, may be seen in an online map.

There are 14 properties and districts listed on the National Register in the county. Another property was once listed but has been removed.

This National Park Service list is complete through NPS recent listings posted May 23, 2025.

== Current listings ==
	Name on the Register	Image	Date listed	Location	City or town	Description
1	Davis Works	Davis Works	July 15, 1974 (#74001525)	Southwestern quarter of Section 8, Town 11, Range 19; 39°26′36″N 82°43′16″W	Salt Creek Township	
2	George Deffenbaugh Mound		July 15, 1974 (#74001526)	Northeast of Laurelville	Salt Creek Township	
3	Haydenville Historic Town	Haydenville Historic Town	March 20, 1973 (#73001480)	Haydenville; 39°28′41″N 82°19′31″W	Green Township	
4	Hocking Valley Railway Historic District	Hocking Valley Railway Historic District	May 5, 1988 (#88000451)	Roughly between Bridge #494 in Logan and Bridge #629 in Nelsonville; 39°28′46″N 82°19′11″W	Falls Township, Green Township, Logan, and Starr Township	Extends into Athens County
5	Inter County Highway 360	Inter County Highway 360	December 20, 2002 (#02001552)	Iles Rd., west of Logan; 39°33′27″N 82°27′28″W	Falls Township	
6	Charles Worth James House	Charles Worth James House	September 11, 1980 (#80003100)	75 Hill St. 39°32′33″N 82°24′37″W	Logan	
7	Karshner Mound	Karshner Mound	July 15, 1974 (#74001527)	Second terrace above Salt Creek; 39°27′05″N 82°43′12″W	Salt Creek Township	
8	Logan City Hall	Logan City Hall	February 11, 1980 (#80003101)	101 E. Main St. 39°32′23″N 82°24′24″W	Logan	
9	Logan Historic District	Logan Historic District	April 19, 2010 (#10000192)	Roughly bounded by 2nd St., Spring St., Hill St., Keynes Dr., and Culver St. 39°32′24″N 82°24′25″W	Logan	
10	McCarthy-Blosser-Dillon Building	McCarthy-Blosser-Dillon Building	November 29, 1984 (#84000449)	4 W. Main St. 39°32′25″N 82°24′32″W	Logan	
11	Riley Specialty Shoe Company		March 10, 2023 (#100008686)	14 Gallagher Ave. 39°32′24″N 82°24′50″W	Logan	
12	Edith Ross Mound		June 18, 1973 (#73001481)	Address Restricted	Salt Creek Township	Near Laurelville
13	Saint John the Evangelist Catholic Church Complex	Saint John the Evangelist Catholic Church Complex	March 13, 1997 (#97000200)	351 N. Market St. 39°32′35″N 82°24′33″W	Logan	
14	William H. Woodruff House	William H. Woodruff House	July 29, 1982 (#82003598)	35330 Linton Rd., southeast of Logan; 39°31′13″N 82°21′55″W	Green Township	

== Former listing ==
	Name on the Register	Image	Date listed	Date removed	Location	City or town	Description
1	Ladies Comfort Station		March 9, 1990 (#90000382)	Unknown	S. Mulberry St.	Logan	

== See also ==
- List of National Historic Landmarks in Ohio
- Listings in neighboring counties: Athens, Fairfield, Perry, Pickaway, Ross, Vinton
- National Register of Historic Places listings in Ohio
