= Kidwell Covered Bridge =

- U.S. National Register of Historic Places
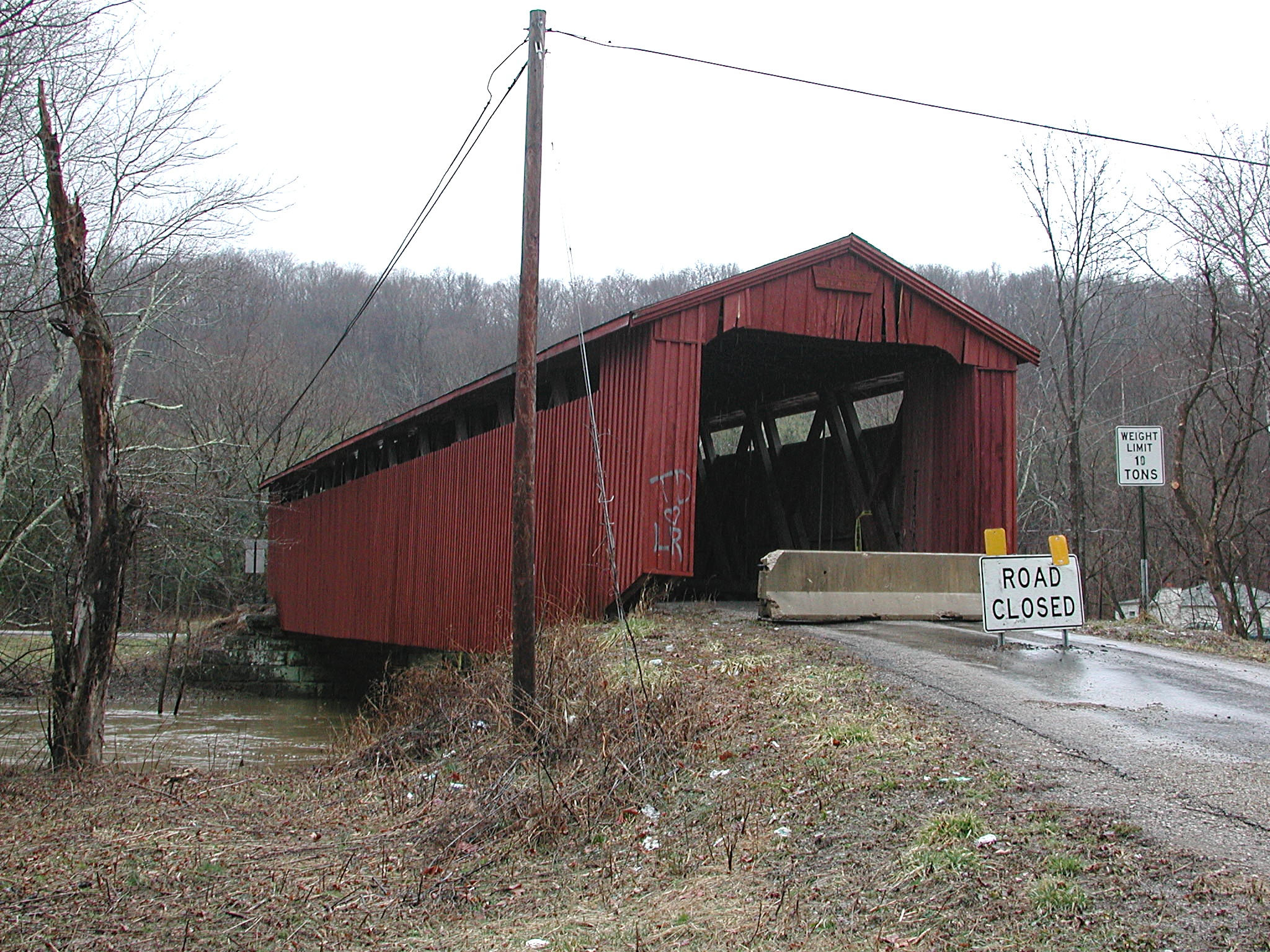
- Bridge, closed, in March 2011
- Area: less than one acre
- Architectural style: Howe truss covered bridge
- NRHP reference No.: 77001042
- Added to NRHP: April 11, 1977

The Kidwell Covered Bridge, in Dover Township, Athens County, Ohio between the nearby hamlets of Truetown and Redtown, was built in 1880. It spans Sunday Creek. It was listed on the National Register of Historic Places in 1977.

It is a Howe truss covered bridge.

Specifically, it is located on Monserat Ridge Road (Township Hwy 332) between Ohio State Route 685 and Ohio State Route 13, one mile north of the unincorporated community of Truetown, Ohio, and about one mile southwest of the unincorporated community of Redtown, Ohio.

It is a wooden, single-span covered bridge, named for the Kidwell family which operated a saw mill and a grist mill about a quarter mile along the creek to the north. It has vertical, highboarded siding, and a metal roof, and it rests upon its original cut stone abutments.

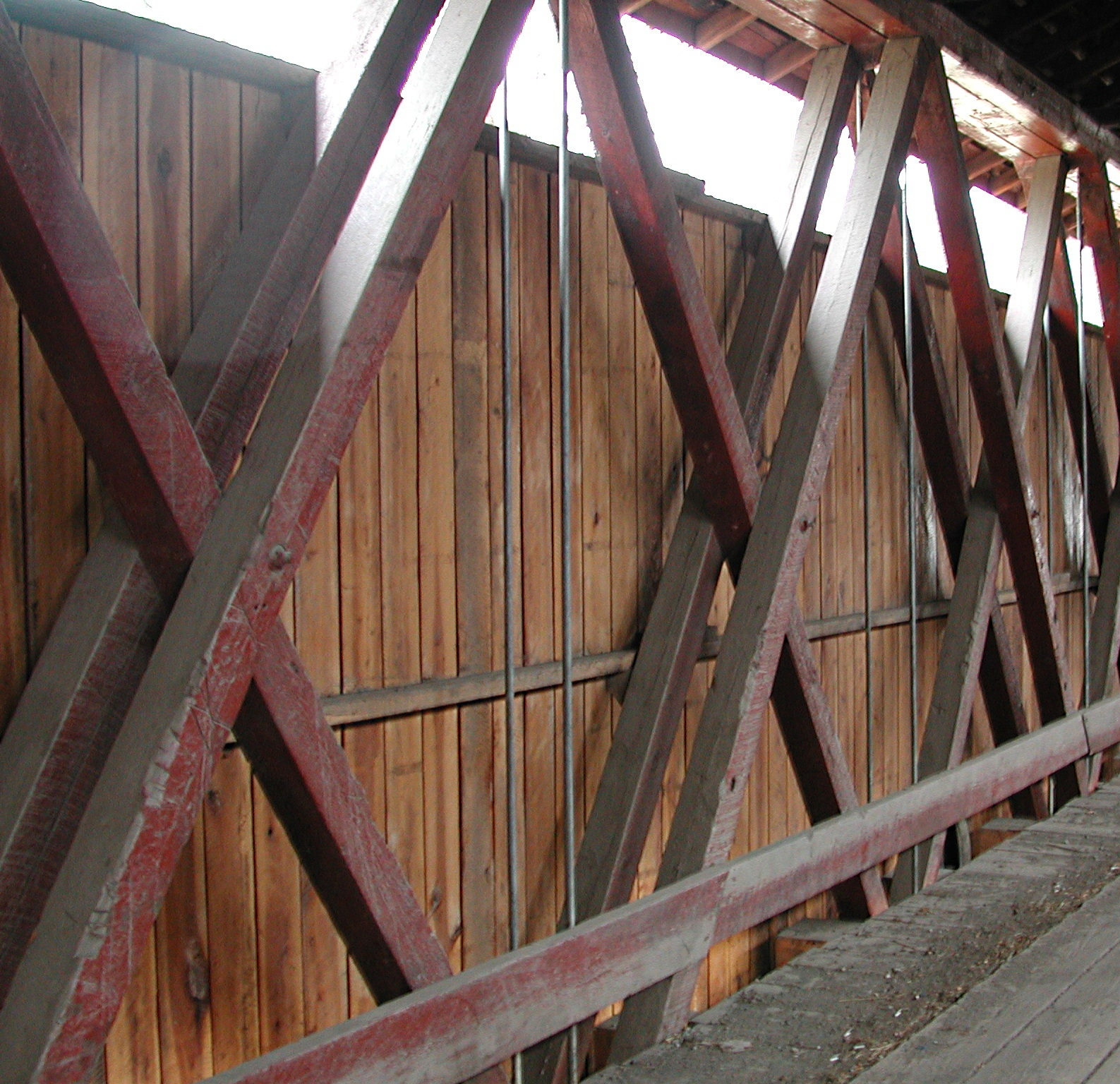

It is about 70 feet (21 m) long. This bridge has been stabilized, renovated and structurally strengthened by the County Engineer's Office of Athens County, Ohio. The bridge was temporarily closed due to damage to overhead structural members caused by an oversize truck being driven across the bridge. The damage to the bridge was repaired and the bridge was reopened.
