= Redtown =

Redtown may refer to:

- Redtown, Ohio, an unincorporated community in Athens County, Ohio
- Redtown, Angelina County, Texas, an unincorporated community in Angelina County, Texas
