= Modoc, Ohio =

- Unincorporated community
- Location within Ohio Location within the United States
- Coordinates: 39°28′06″N 82°07′48″W
- Country: United States
- State: Ohio
- County: Athens
- Elevation: 719 ft (219 m)
- Time zone: UTC-5 (Eastern (EST))
  - Summer (DST): UTC-4 (EDT)
- Area code: 740
- GNIS feature ID: 1076411

Modoc is an unincorporated community in Athens County, Ohio, United States. Modoc is located on Ohio State Route 685 east of Buchtel.

A post office called Modoc was established in 1901, and remained in operation until 1906. A 2003 local newspaper report described it as "almost forgotten".
