= Creola, Ohio =

Unincorporated community in Ohio, U.S.

Coordinates: 39°18′55″N 82°27′59″W

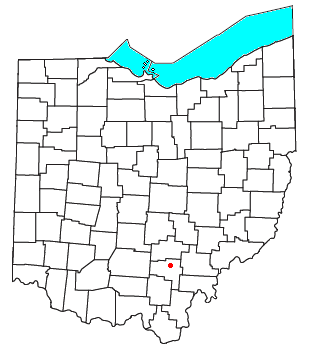
Location of Creola, Ohio

Creola is an unincorporated community in southern Swan Township, Vinton County, Ohio, United States. It had a post office, with ZIP code 45622, from 1860 until May 15, 1992, when service was suspended and mail was instead routed through New Plymouth, Ohio. It is located along State Route 93 approximately five miles north of the county seat of McArthur.

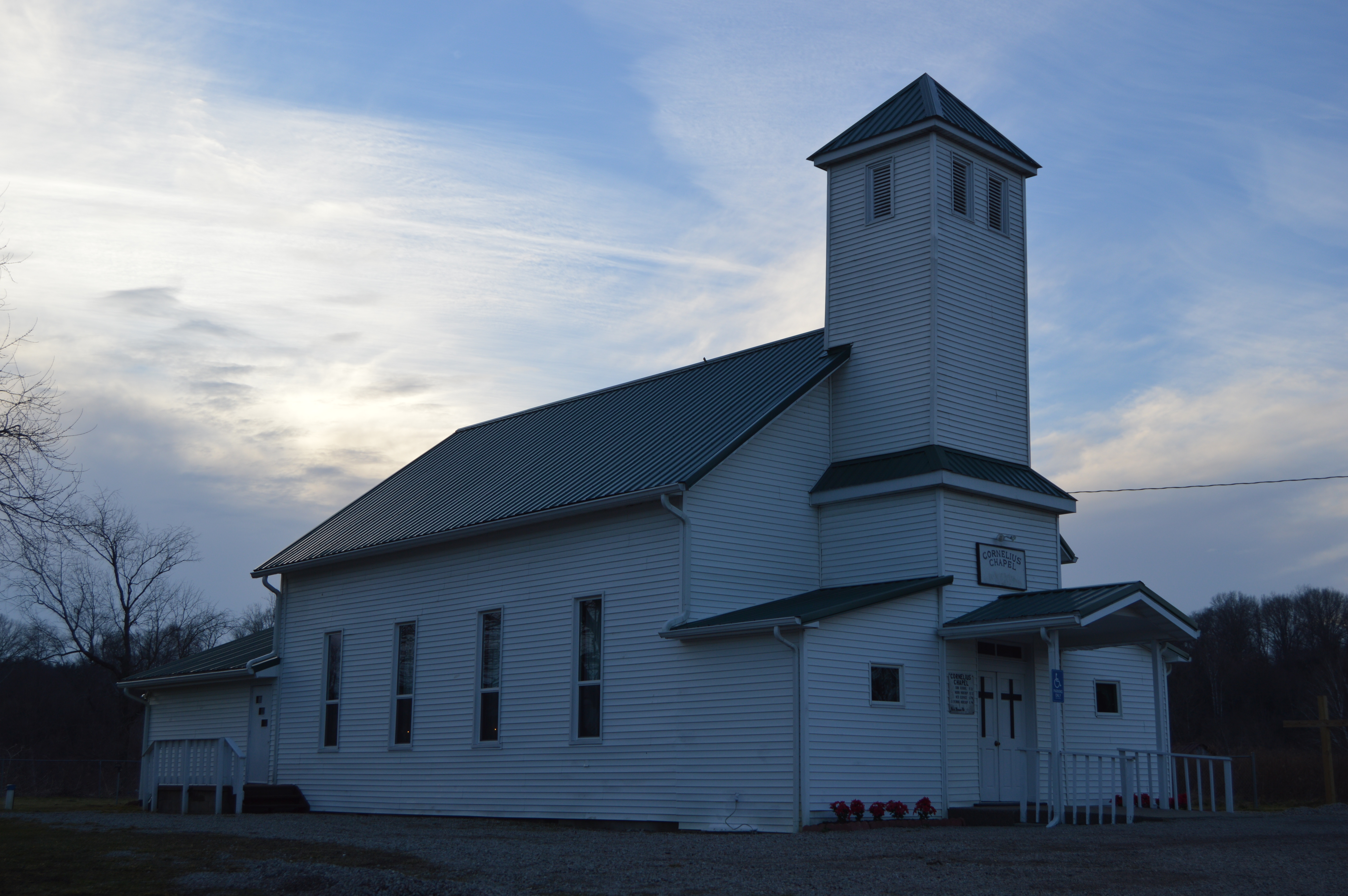
Cornelius Chapel
