= Nelsonville-York High School =

Location
- 1 Buckeye Drive; Nelsonville, (Athens County), Ohio 45764; United States; 39°27′45″N 82°11′20″W

Information
- Type: Public, Coeducational high school
- Established: 1967
- School district: Nelsonville-York City School District
- Superintendent: Rick Edwards
- Principal: Elise Stephan
- Teaching staff: 21.00 (FTE)
- Grades: 9-12
- Enrollment: 295 (2023-2024)
- Student to teacher ratio: 14.05
- Colors: Brown, White, & Orange
- Fight song: Buckeye Battle Cry
- Athletics: baseball, boys' and girls' basketball; boys' and girls' cross country; football; boys' and girls' golf; fast pitch softball; boys' and girls' track and field; girls' volleyball; and boys' wrestling
- Athletics conference: Tri-Valley Conference-Ohio Division
- Team name: Buckeyes
- Accreditation: North Central Association of Colleges and Schools
- Website: School Website

Nelsonville-York High School is a public high school in Nelsonville, Ohio, a southeastern Ohio city in northern Athens County. It is the only high school in the Nelsonville-York City School District. Nelsonville-York City Schools serve York Township, Athens County in northern Athens County, including the City of Nelsonville and the Village of Buchtel. The district also serves Ward Township, Hocking County in extreme eastern Hocking County, including the Village of Murray City and the unincorporated community of Carbon Hill.

== History ==
Nelsonville-York City School District came into existence in the fall of 1967. It was formed between the consolidation of the Nelsonville City School District and the Buchtel-York Local School District. Nelsonville High School sports teams were called the Greyhounds and the school colors were scarlet and gray. Buchtel-York High School sports teams were called the Bruins and the school colors were blue and yellow. When Nelsonville-York High School was established, the team nickname became the Buckeyes and the school colors were brown and white. In the early 1970s, orange was also added as a school color. Brown, White, and Orange are the official school colors of the Buckeyes to this day.

The Nelsonville Greyhounds had been charter members of the Southeastern Ohio Athletic League (SEOAL) since its founding in 1925. Thus, when Nelsonville-York formed in 1967, the Buckeyes were members of the SEOAL. In the fall of 1970, the Buckeyes left the SEOAL to join the Tri Valley Conference (TVC). The Buckeyes played in a unified TVC until the fall of 1993 when the conference split into two divisions - the Ohio Division and the Hocking Division. The Buckeyes then became members of the TVC OHIO and maintain that status to this day.

== Athletics ==
=== Tri-Valley Conference ===
The Buckeyes belong to the Ohio High School Athletic Association (OHSAA) and the Tri-Valley Conference, a 14 member athletic conference located in southeastern Ohio. The conference is divided into two divisions based on school size. The Ohio Division features the larger schools, including Nelsonville-York, and the Hocking Division features the smaller schools.

See also Ohio High School Athletic Conferences

=== Ohio High School Athletic Association State Championships ===
- Football – 1981 (Nelsonville-York Buckeyes)
- Baseball – 1967 (Nelsonville Greyhounds)

=== Ohio High School Athletic Association State Runner Up ===
- Basketball – 1952 (Nelsonville Greyhounds)

== Location ==
The campus for the Nelsonville-York City School District is located within the city limits of Nelsonville and borders the village limits of Buchtel. Therefore, public services are provided by the City of Nelsonville. All athletic facilities are located at the school complex as well, including: Boston Field, Ben Wagner Gymnasium, and Mel Blackburn Fields (Baseball and Softball) all of which are located at the Rocky Brands Athletic Complex.
