= Orland, Ohio =

Coordinates: 39°22′58″N 82°25′26″W

Orland is an unincorporated community in Swan Township, Vinton County, Ohio, in the United States.

== History ==
Orland had its start in the 1880s when the railroad was extended to that point. A post office was established at Orland in 1881, and remained in operation until 1938.
