= Haydenville, Ohio =

- Haydenville Historic Town
- U.S. National Register of Historic Places
- U.S. Historic district
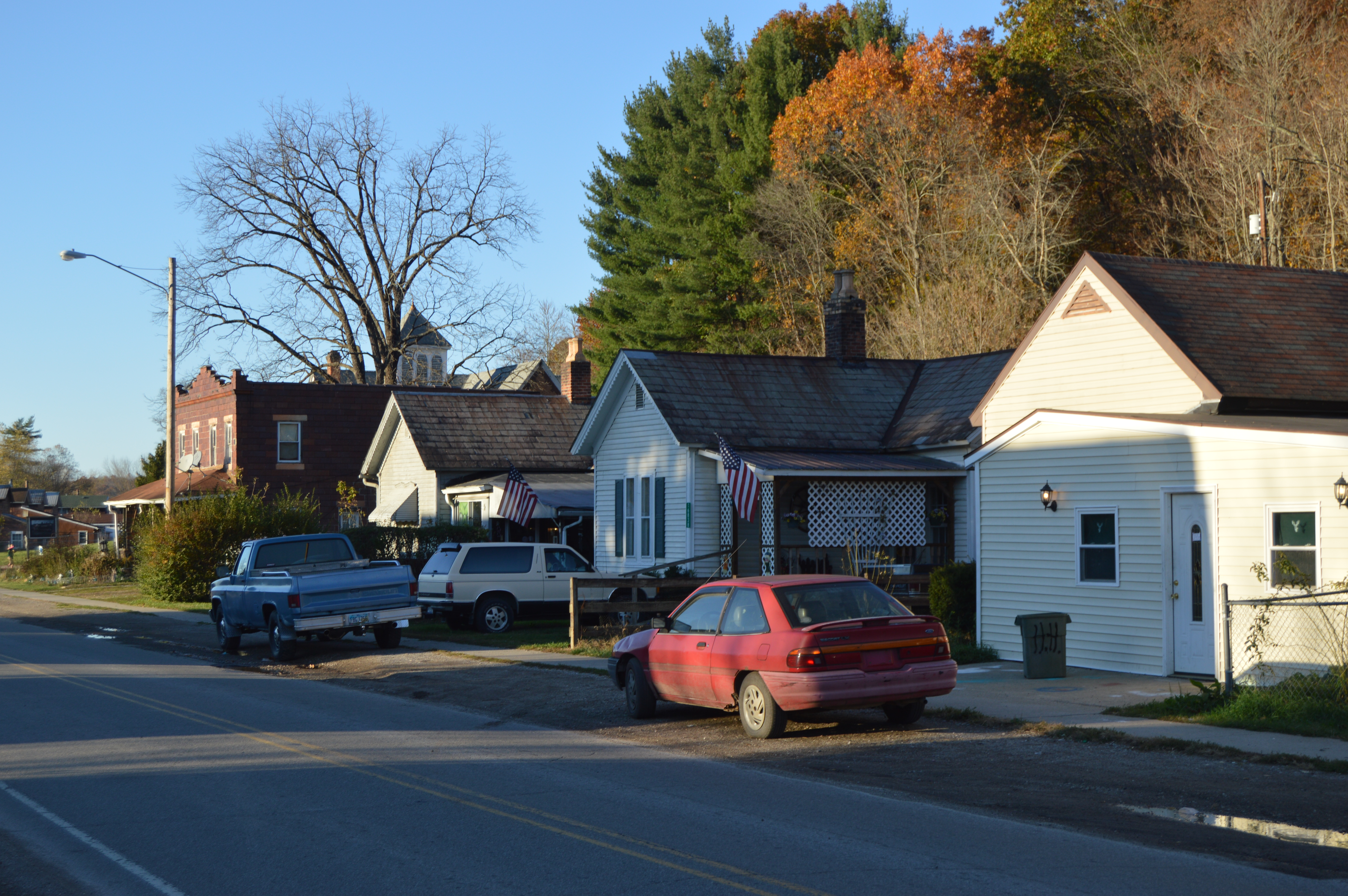
- Houses on Old US 33

- Location within Ohio Location within the United States
- Location: Haydenville
- Coordinates: 39°28′41″N 82°19′31″W
- Area: 20 acres (8.1 ha)
- Built: 1870
- NRHP reference No.: 73001480
- Added to NRHP: March 20, 1973

Haydenville is an unincorporated community and census-designated place (CDP) in southern Green Township, Hocking County, Ohio, United States. As of the 2020 census the population of the CDP was 337.

== History ==
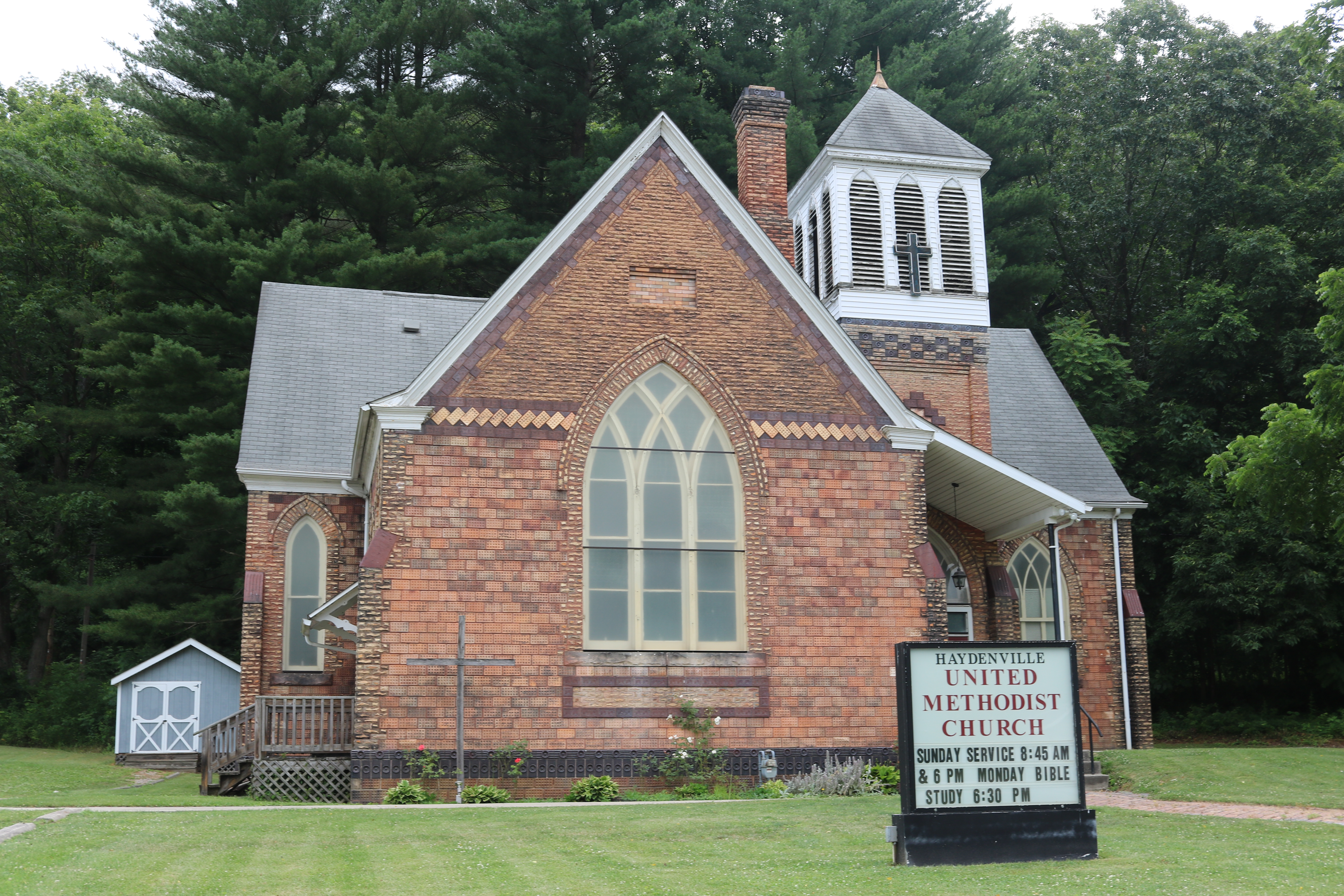
Haydenville United Methodist Church, part of the area historic district

Haydenville was founded in 1852. The community was named for Peter Hayden, the original owner of the town site. A post office has been in operation at Haydenville since 1870.

Haydenville was the last entirely owned company town in Ohio. Hayden established the Haydenville Mining and Manufacturing Company in 1882. The company owned every house and both stores in town. Employees were paid in scrip that they could only spend at the company store. They could not live there unless they worked there, if employees lost their jobs they also lost their home. Other stores were not allowed to open up in town. Only in the early 1960s, after the company was purchased by National Fireproofing Company, were workers allowed to purchase their homes from the company.

In 1973, the community was listed on the National Register of Historic Places as a historic district under the name of "Haydenville Historic Town." Over 120 contributing properties were included in the historic district's 20 acres (8.1 ha).

== Geography ==
Haydenville lies along the Hocking River near U.S. Route 33, southeast of the city of Logan, the county seat of Hocking County. While most of the CDP is within Green Township, the community extends south into Starr Township. Its elevation is 705 feet (215 m), and it is located at 39°28′55″N 82°19′42″W (39.4820130, -82.3282074). Although Haydenville is unincorporated, it has a post office, and a nearby cemetery. Its ZIP code is 43127.

According to the U.S. Census Bureau, the Haydenville CDP has a total area of 0.88 square miles (2.28 km^{2}), of which 0.86 square miles (2.22 km^{2}) are land and 0.03 square miles (0.07 km^{2}), or 2.89%, are water.
