= Jackson Township, Perry County, Ohio =

Township in Ohio, US

- Township
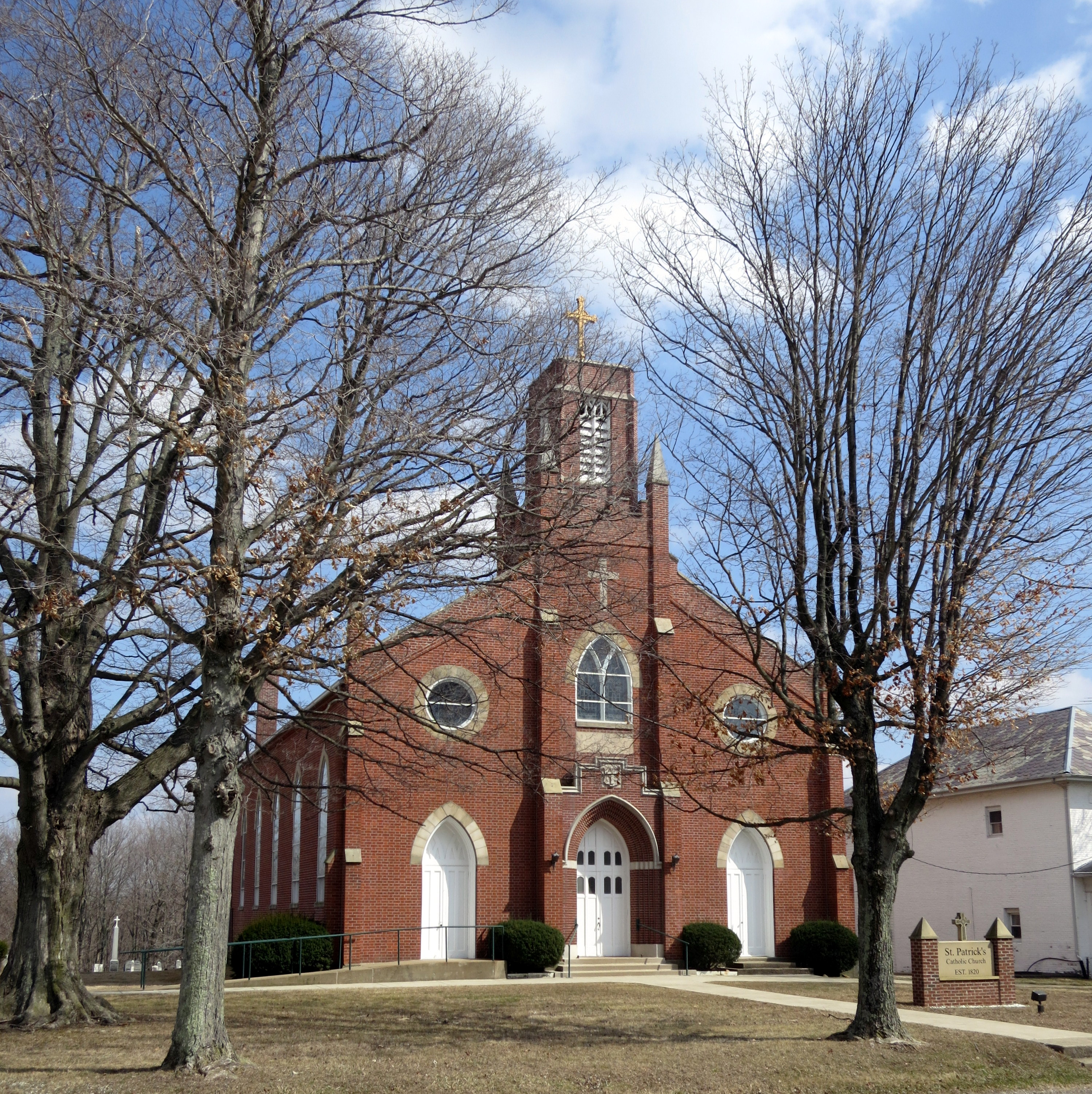
- St. Patrick's Catholic Church, south of Junction City

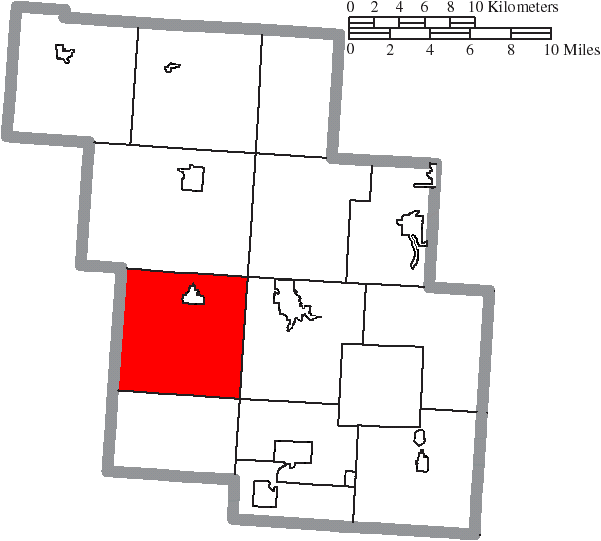
- Location of Jackson Township in Perry County
- Coordinates: 39°42′17″N 82°18′48″W
- Country: United States
- State: Ohio
- County: Perry

Area
  - Total: 37.9 sq mi (98.2 km^{2})
  - Land: 37.9 sq mi (98.2 km^{2})
  - Water: 0 sq mi (0.0 km^{2})
- Elevation: 1,004 ft (306 m)

Population (2020)
  - Total: 2,761
  - Density: 72.8/sq mi (28.1/km^{2})
- Time zone: UTC-5 (Eastern (EST))
  - Summer (DST): UTC-4 (EDT)
- FIPS code: 39-37968
- GNIS feature ID: 1086783
- Website: https://www.jacksontwpoh.com/

Jackson Township is one of the fourteen townships of Perry County, Ohio, United States. The 2020 census found 2,761 people in the township.

== Geography ==
Located in the western part of the county, it borders the following townships:

- Reading Township - north
- Clayton Township - northeast corner
- Pike Township - east
- Salt Lick Township - southeast corner
- Monday Creek Township - south
- Marion Township, Hocking County - southwest corner
- Rush Creek Township, Fairfield County - west

The village of Junction City is located in northern Jackson Township.

== Name and history ==
Jackson Township was organized around 1805, and named for General Andrew Jackson, afterward 7th President of the United States. It is one of thirty-seven Jackson Townships statewide.

== Government ==
The township is governed by a three-member board of trustees, who are elected in November of odd-numbered years to a four-year term beginning on the following January 1. Two are elected in the year after the presidential election and one is elected in the year before it. There is also an elected township fiscal officer, who serves a four-year term beginning on April 1 of the year after the election, which is held in November of the year before the presidential election. Vacancies in the fiscal officership or on the board of trustees are filled by the remaining trustees.
