= Hide-A-Way Hills, Ohio =

- Census-designated place
- Location within Ohio Location within the United States
- Coordinates: 39°39′18″N 82°27′57″W
- Country: United States
- State: Ohio
- Counties: Fairfield, Hocking
- Township: Rush Creek, Marion

Area
  - Total: 2.82 sq mi (7.31 km^{2})
  - Land: 2.61 sq mi (6.75 km^{2})
  - Water: 0.22 sq mi (0.56 km^{2})
- Elevation: 1,001 ft (305 m)

Population (2020)
  - Total: 976
  - Density: 374.5/sq mi (144.61/km^{2})
- Time zone: UTC-5 (Eastern (EST))
  - Summer (DST): UTC-4 (EDT)
- FIPS code: 39-35126
- GNIS feature ID: 2628900
- Website: www.hideawayhillsclub.com

Hide-A-Way Hills is a census-designated place (CDP) in Fairfield and Hocking counties in the U.S. state of Ohio. As of the 2020 census, the community had a population of 976.

== History ==
Hide-A-Way Hills is a residential lake community located in the scenic Hocking Hills of southeastern Ohio. Established in 1961, the development was designed as a gated retreat offering both permanent residences and vacation homes, surrounded by natural beauty. It spans 1,730 acres of wooded terrain, rolling hills, and lakes, providing a secluded environment for its residents.

Amenities: The community operates as a private, member-owned, club and homeowners’ association. Property ownership within the community includes membership in the club. Members share access to a wide range of core amenities maintained by the association which include five lakes, including the Lake of the Four Seasons, Deerfoot, Arrowhead, Tomahawk, and Eagle Claw; 9-hole golf course with Clubhouse Bar and Grill; Lodge Restaurant and Bar with dining and event spaces; Outdoor pool, tennis and pickleball courts; And an Amphitheater and parks.

Governance: Hide-A-Way Hills Club, Inc. is governed by a Board of Trustees elected by the membership. The board oversees community operations, security, maintenance, and long-term planning. Membership requires that members pay assessments and fees to support operational and capital expenses, plus reserve funding.

Community: Hide-A-Way Hills maintains a reputation as a close-knit, nature-oriented community. Residents value privacy, outdoor living, and a sense of retreat from urban life. The combination of wooded lots, lakefront properties, and well-maintained facilities contributes to its appeal as both a weekend getaway and a year-round residence.

== Geography ==
Hide-A-Way Hills is located in northern Hocking County and southeastern Fairfield County. Their lakes are built on several tributaries of Rush Creek, which in turn is a tributary of the Hocking River, which flows south to the Ohio River. About two-thirds of the community lies in northwestern Marion Township in Hocking County, while the remainder is in southern Rush Creek Township in Fairfield County.

Hide-A-Way Hills is 10 miles (16 km) southeast of Lancaster, the Fairfield County seat, and 12 miles (19 km) northwest of Logan, the seat of Hocking County. Columbus, the state capital, is 41 miles (66 km) to the northwest.

According to the United States Census Bureau, the Hide-A-Way Hills CDP has a total area of 2.8 square miles (7.3 km^{2}), of which 2.6 square miles (6.7 km^{2}) is land and 0.23 square miles (0.6 km^{2}), or 7.71%, is water. The population was 976 as of 2020.

== Demographics ==
Historical population
| Census | Pop. | Note | %± |
|---|---|---|---|
| 2020 | 976 | | — |
U.S. Decennial Census
