= York Township, Athens County, Ohio =

Township in Ohio, US

- Township
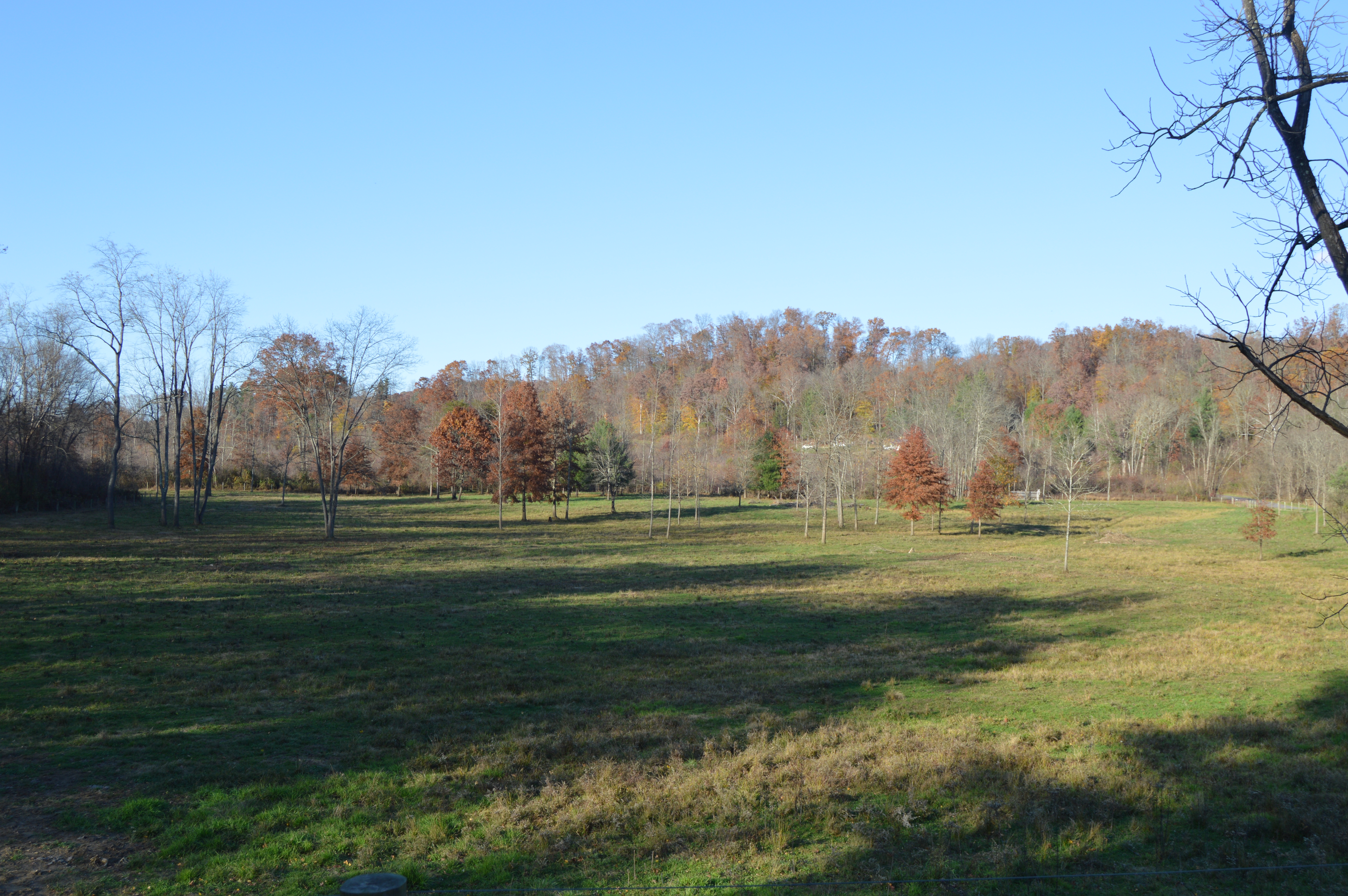
- Fields and woods north of Doanville

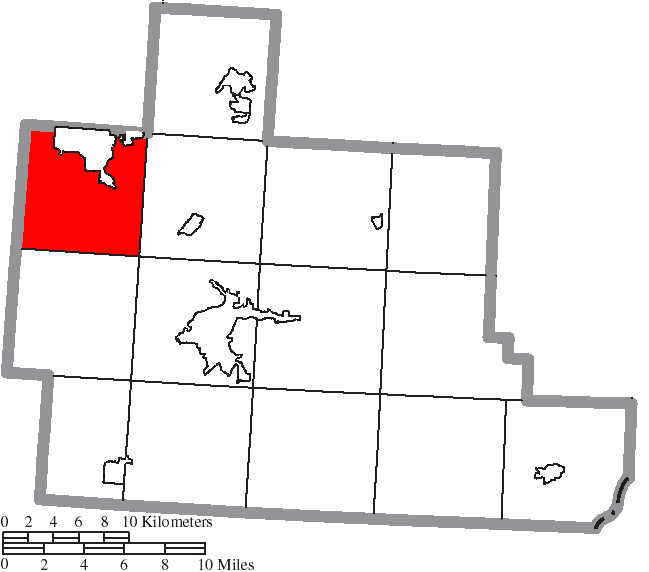
- Location of York Township in Athens County
- Coordinates: 39°26′31″N 82°12′56″W
- Country: United States
- State: Ohio
- County: Athens

Area
  - Total: 37.3 sq mi (96.7 km^{2})
  - Land: 36.9 sq mi (95.6 km^{2})
  - Water: 0.42 sq mi (1.1 km^{2})
- Elevation: 823 ft (251 m)

Population (2020)
  - Total: 6,852
  - Density: 186/sq mi (71.7/km^{2})
- Time zone: UTC-5 (Eastern (EST))
  - Summer (DST): UTC-4 (EDT)
- FIPS code: 39-86982
- GNIS feature ID: 1085761

York Township is one of the fourteen townships of Athens County, Ohio, United States. The 2020 census found 6,852 people in the township.

== Geography ==
Located in the northwestern corner of the county, it borders the following townships:

- Ward Township, Hocking County - north
- Trimble Township - northeast corner
- Dover Township - east
- Athens Township - southeast corner
- Waterloo Township - south
- Brown Township, Vinton County - southwest corner
- Starr Township, Hocking County - west
- Green Township, Hocking County - northwest corner

The city of Nelsonville is located in northern York Township, and the village of Buchtel is located in the northeast corner of the township.

== Name and history ==
York Township was organized in 1818.

It is one of ten York Townships statewide.

== Government ==
The township is governed by a three-member board of trustees, who are elected in November of odd-numbered years to a four-year term beginning on the following January 1. Two are elected in the year after the presidential election and one is elected in the year before it. There is also an elected township fiscal officer, who serves a four-year term beginning on April 1 of the year after the election, which is held in November of the year before the presidential election. Vacancies in the fiscal officership or on the board of trustees are filled by the remaining trustees.

== Public services ==
The residents of York Township are served by the Nelsonville-York City School District and Nelsonville-York High School.
