= Ohio State Route 685 =

State highway in Athens County, Ohio, US

State Route 685

Route information
- Maintained by ODOT
- Length: 5.24 mi (8.43 km)
- Existed: 1937–present

Major junctions
- West end: SR 78 in Buchtel
- North end: SR 13 near Jacksonville

Location
- Country: United States
- State: Ohio
- Counties: Athens

Highway system
- Ohio State Highway System; Interstate; US; State; Scenic
← SR 684	→ SR 686

State Route 685 (SR 685) is a short east–west state highway in southeastern Ohio, a U.S. state. The western terminus of SR 685 is at SR 78 in the village of Buchtel. Its eastern terminus is at SR 13 approximately one mile (1.6 km) southwest of Jacksonville.

Existing in the northern portion of Athens County, SR 685 functions as a connector route between SR 78 and SR 13 as it makes its way through the Wayne National Forest. The designation of SR 685 came into being in the early 1960s, replacing what had been known as SR 675, due to the construction of Interstate 675 in the Dayton vicinity, and the fact that Ohio does not duplicate numbers among different types of highways.

== Route description ==
All of SR 685 is located in the northern portion of Athens County. This state highway is not included as a part of the National Highway System.

SR 685 begins at its junction with SR 78 in the village of Buchtel. The highway starts out heading easterly along Green Run Road, and as a side street called Oakley Drive arcs out to the northeast, the state highway bends to the east, departs the village and enters into Dover Township. The rural portion of SR 685 passes through Wayne National Forest. It is very curvy through the wooded terrain, generally trending easterly. As it bends to the southeast, the highway encounters Big Bailey Run Road (County Road 29). SR 685 then bends back to the east, and as it turns more northeasterly, it passes Carr Bailey Road. The highway turns easterly briefly, straddles the township boundary as it intersects Oregon Ridge Road, then curves back to the east-northeast into Trimble Township. Continuing easterly, SR 685 passes a few homes amid the unincorporated community of Modoc, where it also intersects Koches Road. As the highway bends back to the east-southeast, it meets Greens Run Road, then passes back into Dover Township. The highway comes very tightly into its intersection with Truetown Road (County Road 95), traveling in a "U" shape from southeast to northeast. The landscape opens up a bit as the highway runs northeasterly back into Trimble Township, with a few homes appearing along the way, along with some grassy knolls. SR 685 bends to the east as it arrives at its endpoint, a T-intersection with SR 13 one mile (1.6 km) southwest of Jacksonville.

== History ==
When first added to the state highway system in 1937, the highway running between SR 78 at Buchtel and SR 13 near Jacksonville that currently carries the SR 685 designation was identified as SR 675. With the coming of the Interstate Highway System into Ohio in 1962, because by rule, no Interstate or U.S. highways can have a duplicate state highway of the same number, SR 675 was re-designated as SR 685 in that year. No other changes of major significance have taken place to the highway since then.

== Major intersections ==
The entire route is in Athens County.

Location	mi	km	Destinations	Notes
Buchtel	0.00	0.00	SR 78 (Burr Oak Boulevard)	
Trimble Township	5.24	8.43	SR 13	
1.000 mi = 1.609 km; 1.000 km = 0.621 mi
