= Ewing, Ohio =

Coordinates: 39°28′21″N 82°26′00″W

Ewing is an unincorporated community in Washington Township, Hocking County, Ohio, United States.

== History ==
Ewing was laid out in 1850. A first post office was established at Ewing in 1850.
