= Marion Township, Hocking County, Ohio =

Township in Ohio, US

- Township
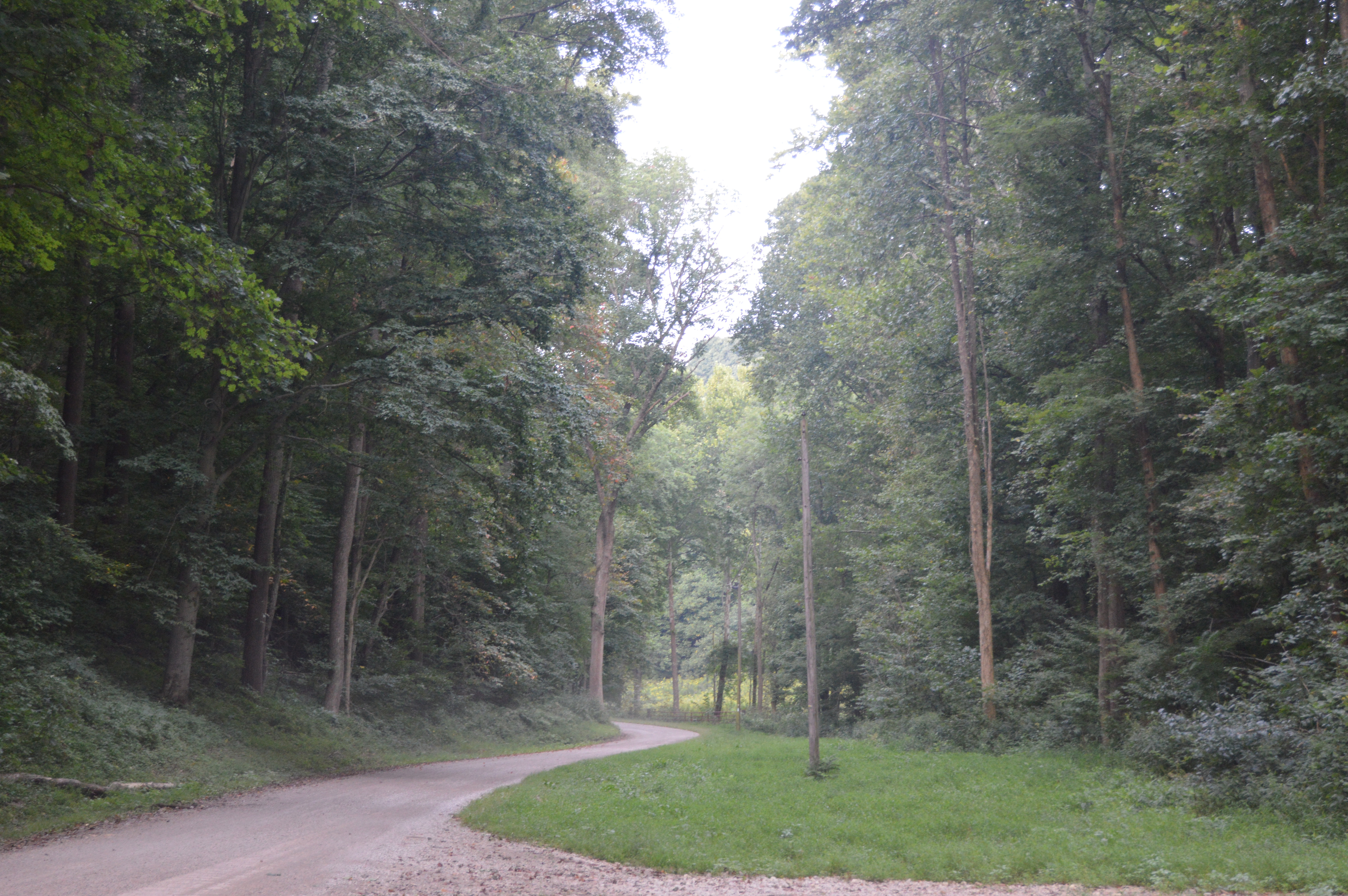
- Woodland north of Enterprise

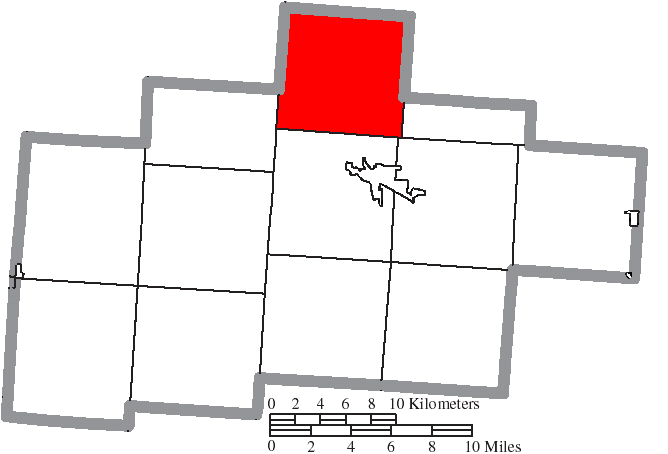
- Location of Marion Township in Hocking County
- Coordinates: 39°37′13″N 82°26′17″W
- Country: United States
- State: Ohio
- County: Hocking

Area
  - Total: 37.3 sq mi (96.7 km^{2})
  - Land: 37.0 sq mi (95.9 km^{2})
  - Water: 0.35 sq mi (0.9 km^{2})
- Elevation: 974 ft (297 m)

Population (2020)
  - Total: 2,493
  - Density: 67.3/sq mi (26.0/km^{2})
- Time zone: UTC-5 (Eastern (EST))
  - Summer (DST): UTC-4 (EDT)
- FIPS code: 39-47740
- GNIS feature ID: 1086321

Marion Township is one of the eleven townships of Hocking County, Ohio, United States. As of the 2020 census the population was 2,493.

== Geography ==
Located in the northern part of the county, it borders the following townships:

- Rush Creek Township, Fairfield County - north
- Jackson Township, Perry County - northeast corner
- Monday Creek Township, Perry County - east
- Falls Township (northeastern portion) - southeast, between Monday Creek and Green townships
- Green Township - southeast
- Falls Township (southwestern portion) - south
- Good Hope Township - southwest
- Berne Township, Fairfield County - west

It is the most northerly township in Hocking County.

No municipalities are located in Marion Township, but the census-designated place of Hide-A-Way Hills is located in the township's north.

== Name and history ==
It is one of twelve Marion Townships statewide.

== Government ==
The township is governed by a three-member board of trustees, who are elected in November of odd-numbered years to a four-year term beginning on the following January 1. Two are elected in the year after the presidential election and one is elected in the year before it. There is also an elected township fiscal officer, who serves a four-year term beginning on April 1 of the year after the election, which is held in November of the year before the presidential election. Vacancies in the fiscal officership or on the board of trustees are filled by the remaining trustees.
