= Redtown, Ohio =

- Unincorporated community
- Location within Ohio Location within the United States
- Coordinates: 39°27′57″N 82°05′36″W
- Country: United States
- State: Ohio
- County: Athens
- Elevation: 735 ft (224 m)
- Time zone: UTC-5 (Eastern (EST))
  - Summer (DST): UTC-4 (EDT)
- Area code: 740
- GNIS feature ID: 1076722

Redtown is an unincorporated community in Athens County, Ohio, United States. Redtown is located at the intersection of State Routes 13 and 685. The community is north of Chauncey and south of Jacksonville.
