= Murray City, Ohio =

- Village
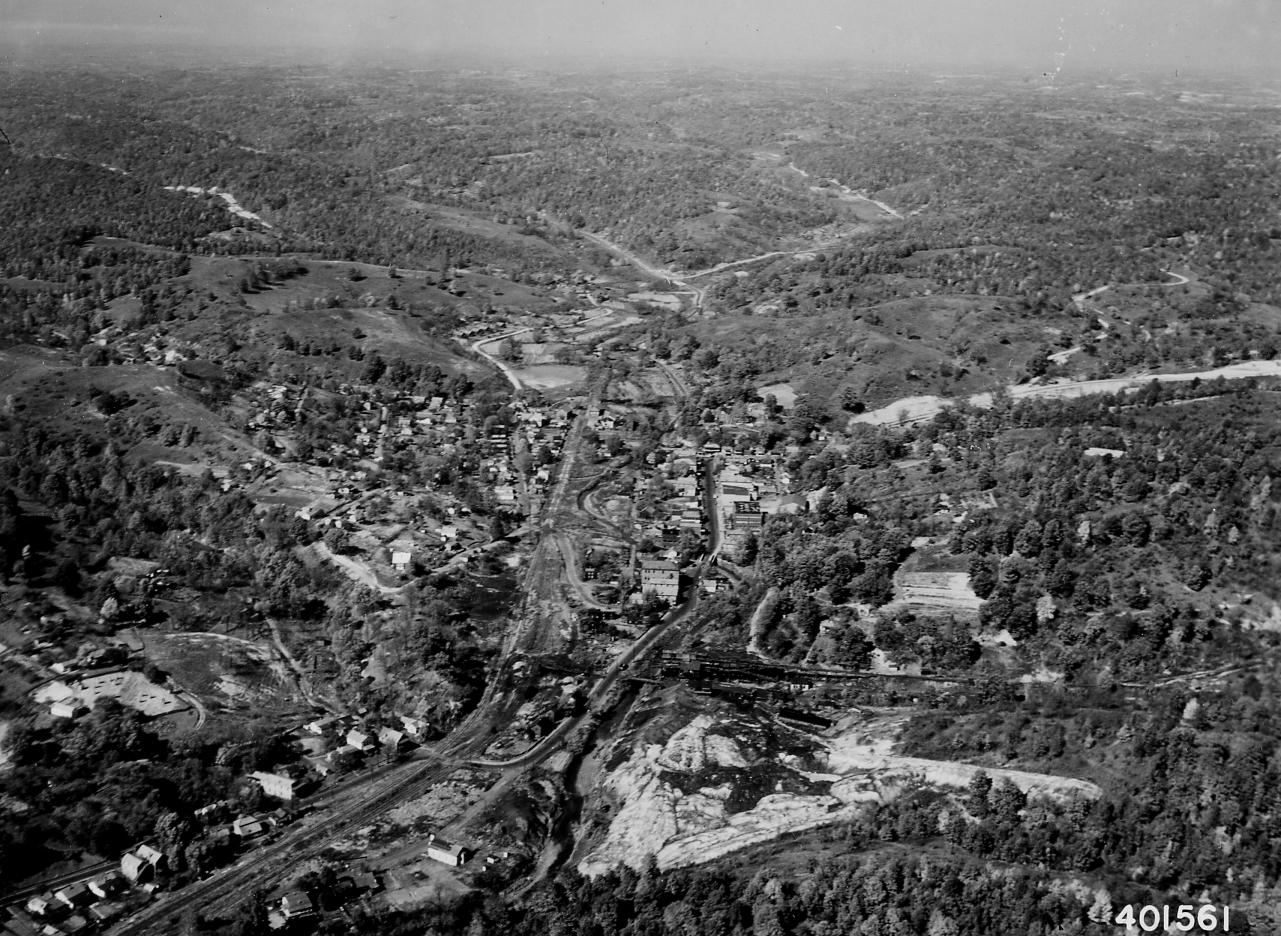
- Aerial view in 1940

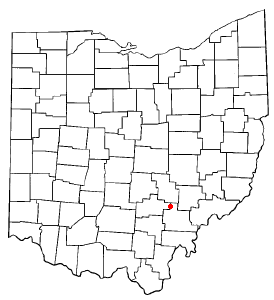
- Location of Murray City, Ohio

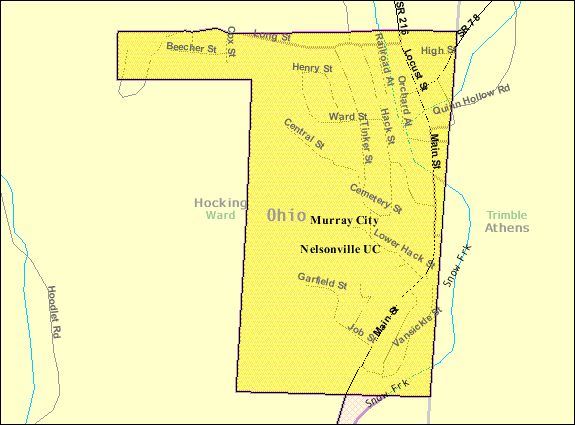
- Detailed map of Murray City
- Coordinates: 39°30′35″N 82°10′04″W
- Country: United States
- State: Ohio
- County: Hocking
- Township: Ward

Area
  - Total: 0.32 sq mi (0.82 km^{2})
  - Land: 0.32 sq mi (0.82 km^{2})
  - Water: 0 sq mi (0.00 km^{2})
- Elevation: 764 ft (233 m)

Population (2020)
  - Total: 341
  - Density: 1,074.1/sq mi (414.71/km^{2})
- Time zone: UTC-5 (Eastern (EST))
  - Summer (DST): UTC-4 (EDT)
- ZIP code: 43144
- Area code: 740
- FIPS code: 39-53410
- GNIS feature ID: 2399431

Murray City is a village in Hocking County, Ohio, United States. The population was 341 at the 2020 census.

== History ==
Murray City was platted in 1873 and incorporated in 1891. It was named after John Murray Brown, the original landowner who built a hotel in the area in 1875.

The town grew rapidly due to coal mining and became one of the largest coal towns in the Hocking Valley. At its peak in the early 20th century, the population exceeded 2,000 and supported a hotel, saloons, churches, a train depot, and dozens of businesses.

Coal production slowed in the 1930s, and after major mine closures in 1937, Murray City experienced a steep economic and population decline.

The village once fielded a semi-professional football team, the Murray City Tigers, in the 1920s. The team is noted in local histories and was part of the region's early sports culture.

== Geography ==
Murray City is located along the Snow Fork, a tributary of Monday Creek.

According to the United States Census Bureau, the village has a total area of 0.32 square miles (0.83 km^{2}), all land.

== Demographics ==
Historical population
Census	Pop.	Note	%±
1900	1,118		—
1910	1,386		24.0%
1920	1,493		7.7%
1930	1,048		−29.8%
1940	1,009		−3.7%
1950	752		−25.5%
1960	717		−4.7%
1970	562		−21.6%
1980	579		3.0%
1990	499		−13.8%
2000	452		−9.4%
2010	449		−0.7%
2020	341		−24.1%
U.S. Decennial Census

=== 2020 census ===
According to the 2020 United States Census, the village had a population of 341.

More recent estimates suggest a median household income of $46,600 and a poverty rate of approximately 22.7%.

As of the census of 2010, there were 449 people, 175 households, and 117 families living in the village. The population density was 1,403.1 inhabitants per square mile (541.7/km^{2}). There were 211 housing units at an average density of 659.4 per square mile (254.6/km^{2}). The racial makeup of the village was 99.1% White, 0.2% African American, and 0.7% from two or more races. Hispanic or Latino of any race were 1.3% of the population.

There were 175 households, of which 33.7% had children under the age of 18 living with them, 46.3% were married couples living together, 13.1% had a female householder with no husband present, 7.4% had a male householder with no wife present, and 33.1% were non-families. 24.0% of all households were made up of individuals, and 10.8% had someone living alone who was 65 years of age or older. The average household size was 2.57 and the average family size was 2.97.

The median age in the village was 37.4 years. 23.6% of residents were under the age of 18; 10% were between the ages of 18 and 24; 24.9% were from 25 to 44; 28.5% were from 45 to 64; and 12.9% were 65 years of age or older. The gender makeup of the village was 49.9% male and 50.1% female.

=== 2000 census ===
As of the census of 2000, there were 452 people, 190 households, and 132 families living in the village. The population density was 1,509.4 inhabitants per square mile (582.8/km^{2}). There were 211 housing units at an average density of 704.6 per square mile (272.0/km^{2}). The racial makeup of the village was 97.57% White, 0.44% Native American, and 1.99% from two or more races.

There were 190 households, out of which 32.6% had children under the age of 18 living with them, 51.6% were married couples living together, 13.2% had a female householder with no husband present, and 30.5% were non-families. 25.3% of all households were made up of individuals, and 13.7% had someone living alone who was 65 years of age or older. The average household size was 2.38 and the average family size was 2.86.

In the village, the population was spread out, with 24.3% under the age of 18, 9.7% from 18 to 24, 29.0% from 25 to 44, 23.9% from 45 to 64, and 13.1% who were 65 years of age or older. The median age was 35 years. For every 100 females, there were 97.4 males. For every 100 females age 18 and over, there were 94.3 males.

The median income for a household in the village was $27,969, and the median income for a family was $32,188. Males had a median income of $30,333 versus $20,313 for females. The per capita income for the village was $12,730. About 19.5% of families and 19.8% of the population were below the poverty line, including 24.3% of those under age 18 and 12.3% of those age 65 or over.

== Government ==
The village is governed by a mayor and a six-member council. Public services include a volunteer fire department, and local utilities for water and road maintenance. Village finances are audited by the Ohio State Auditor.

== Public services ==
The residents of Murray City are served by the Nelsonville-York City School District and Nelsonville-York High School.

== Culture and community ==
Murray City retains its identity as a small Appalachian coal town. The village includes historic early 20th-century storefronts along Main Street, a preserved red train caboose, and St. Philip Neri Catholic Church — a hilltop landmark visible from much of the village.

The surrounding hills and forests are part of the greater Hocking Hills region, popular for hiking, waterfalls, and natural scenery.

== Notable people ==
- Clifford Carlson, basketball coach
- Josh Devore, baseball player

== See also ==
- Coal town
- Ohio State Route 216
- Nelsonville–York City School District
- Hocking County, Ohio
