= Ilesboro, Ohio =

Coordinates: 39°26′05″N 82°27′12″W

Ilesboro is an unincorporated community in Washington Township, Hocking County, Ohio, United States.

== History ==
Ilesboro was platted in 1835. The community was named for Henry Iles, the original owner of the town site. A post office was established at Ilesboro in 1852, and remained in operation until 1902.
