= Rush Creek Township, Fairfield County, Ohio =

Township in Ohio, US

- Township
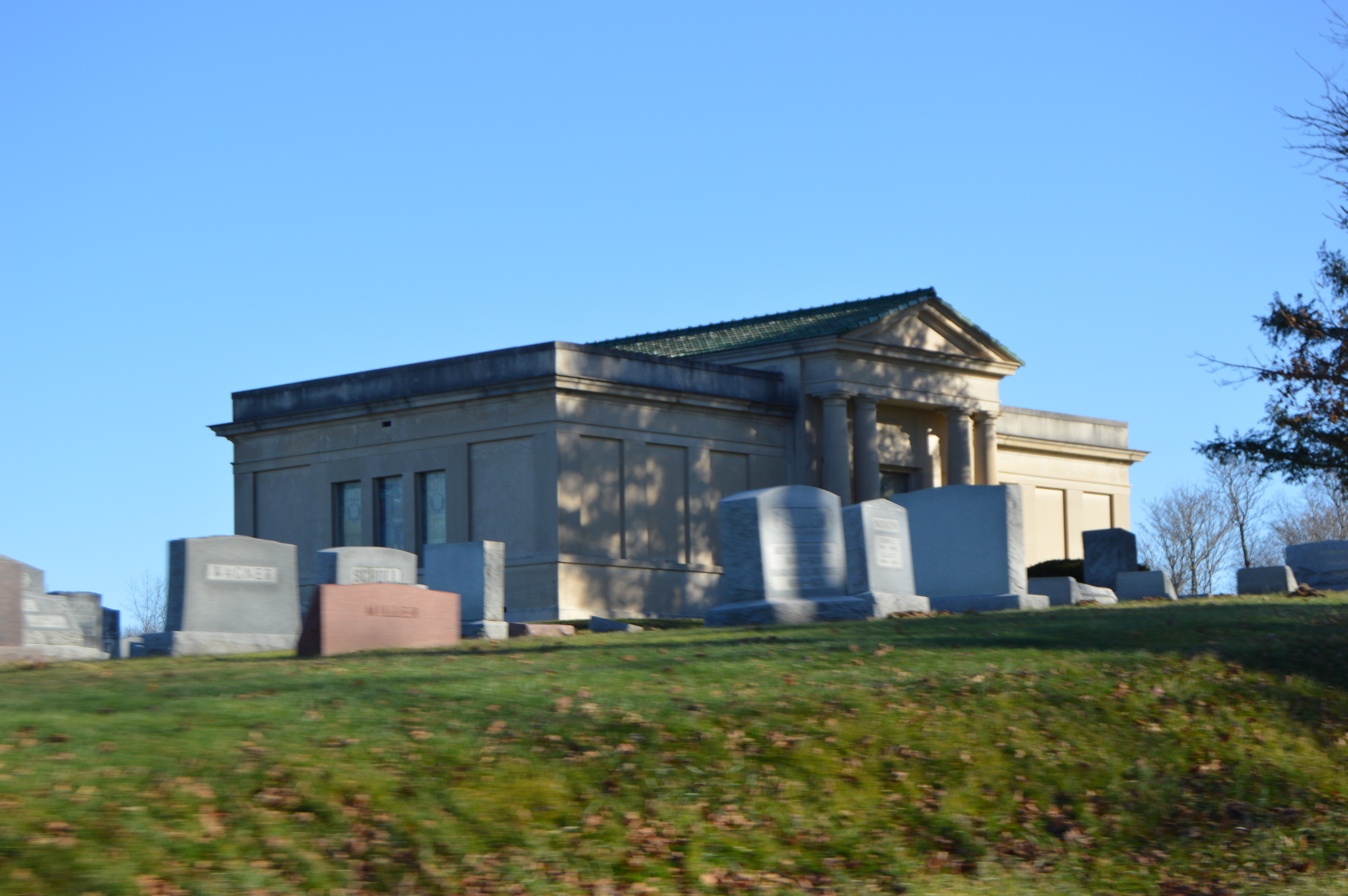
- Bremen community mausoleum, State Route 37

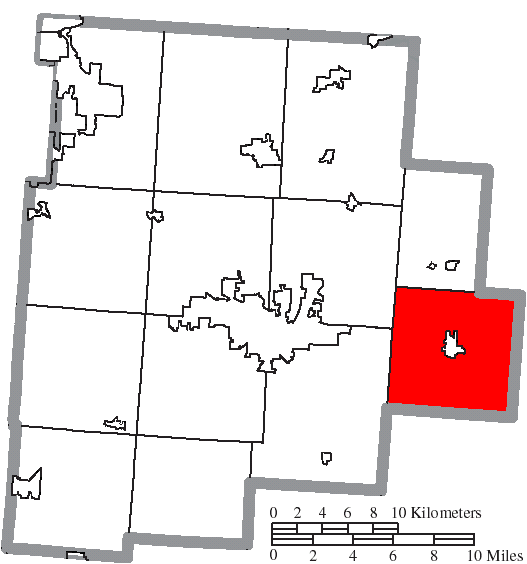
- Location of Rush Creek Township in Fairfield County
- Coordinates: 39°42′7″N 82°25′40″W
- Country: United States
- State: Ohio
- County: Fairfield

Area
  - Total: 37.5 sq mi (97.0 km^{2})
  - Land: 37.2 sq mi (96.3 km^{2})
  - Water: 0.27 sq mi (0.7 km^{2})
- Elevation: 768 ft (234 m)

Population (2020)
  - Total: 3,996
  - Density: 107/sq mi (41.5/km^{2})
- Time zone: UTC-5 (Eastern (EST))
  - Summer (DST): UTC-4 (EDT)
- FIPS code: 39-69120
- GNIS feature ID: 1086083
- Website: www.rushcreektwp.org

Rush Creek Township is one of the thirteen townships of Fairfield County, Ohio, United States. As of the 2020 census the population was 3,996.

== Geography ==
Located in the southeastern corner of the county, it borders the following townships:

- Richland Township - north
- Reading Township, Perry County - northeast
- Jackson Township, Perry County - east
- Monday Creek Township, Perry County - southeast corner
- Marion Township, Hocking County - south
- Berne Township - southwest
- Pleasant Township - northwest

The village of Bremen is located in central Rush Creek Township, and part of the census-designated place of Hide-A-Way Hills lies in the township's south.

== Name and history ==
This township took its name from Rush Creek. It is the only Rush Creek Township statewide, although there is a Rushcreek Township in Logan County.

== Government ==
The township is governed by a three-member board of trustees, who are elected in November of odd-numbered years to a four-year term beginning on the following January 1. Two are elected in the year after the presidential election and one is elected in the year before it. There is also an elected township fiscal officer, who serves a four-year term beginning on April 1 of the year after the election, which is held in November of the year before the presidential election. Vacancies in the fiscal officership or on the board of trustees are filled by the remaining trustees.
