= Sand Run, Ohio =

Coordinates: 39°30′54″N 82°14′15″W

Sand Run is an unincorporated community in Ward Township, Hocking County, Ohio, United States.

== History ==
Sand Run was laid out in 1880. A post office was established at Sand Run in 1881, and remained in operation until 1909.
