= Swan Township, Vinton County, Ohio =

Township in Ohio, US

- Township
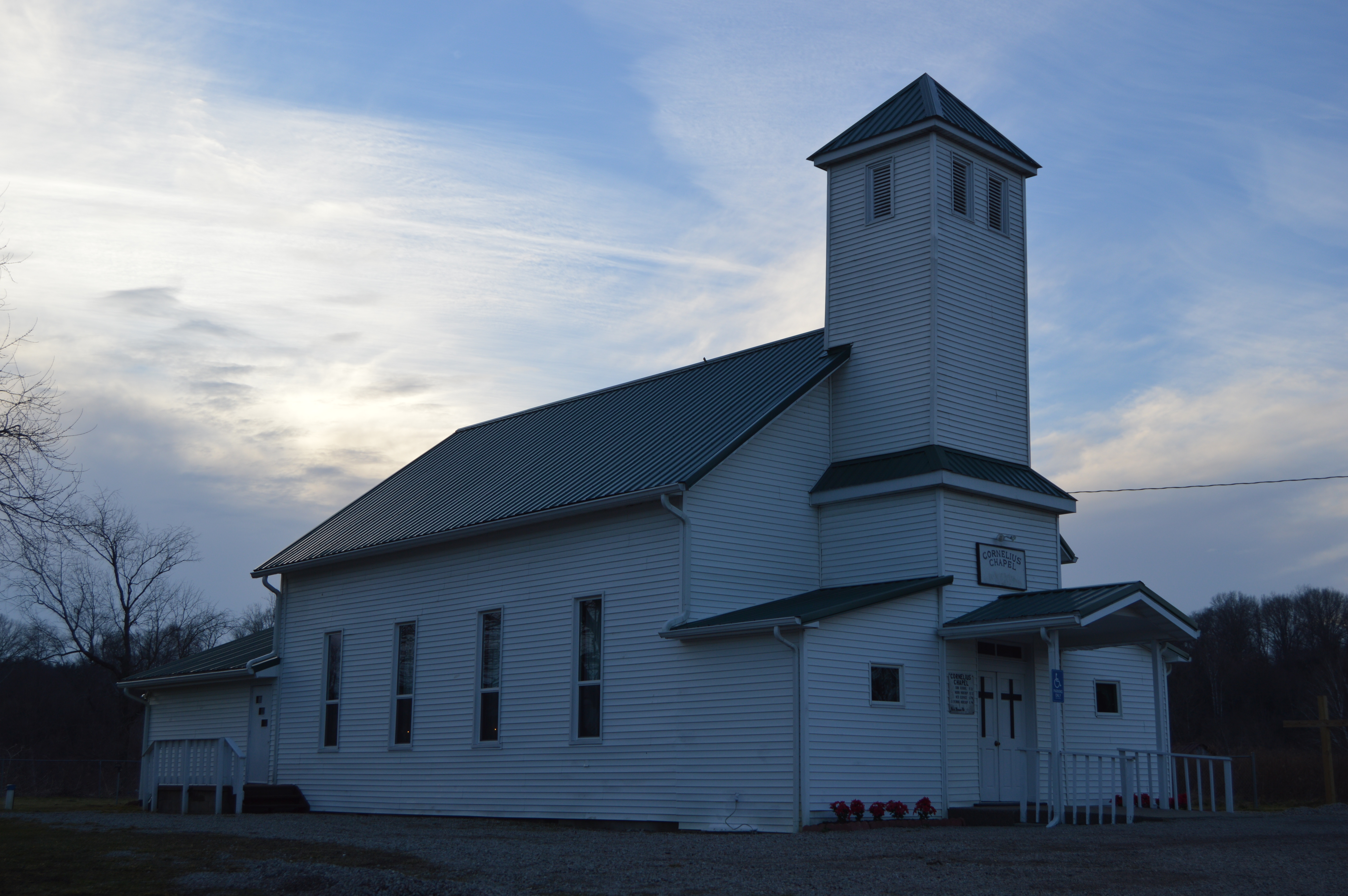
- Cornelius Chapel at Creola

- Location in Vinton County and the state of Ohio.
- Coordinates: 39°21′19″N 82°27′27″W
- Country: United States
- State: Ohio
- County: Vinton

Area
  - Total: 37.6 sq mi (97.4 km^{2})
  - Land: 37.6 sq mi (97.3 km^{2})
  - Water: 0 sq mi (0.0 km^{2})
- Elevation: 899 ft (274 m)

Population (2020)
  - Total: 892
  - Density: 23.7/sq mi (9.17/km^{2})
- Time zone: UTC-5 (Eastern (EST))
  - Summer (DST): UTC-4 (EDT)
- FIPS code: 39-75854
- GNIS feature ID: 1087108

Swan Township is one of the twelve townships of Vinton County, Ohio, United States. The 2020 census found 892 people in the township.

== Geography ==
Located in the northern part of the county, it borders the following townships:

- Washington Township, Hocking County: north
- Starr Township, Hocking County: northeast corner
- Brown Township: east
- Madison Township: southeast
- Elk Township: south
- Jackson Township: west
- Benton Township, Hocking County: northwest

No municipalities are located in Swan Township, although the unincorporated community of Creola lies in the southern part of the township. It also contains the unincorporated communities of Hue and Orland.

== Name and history ==
It is the only Swan Township statewide, although there is a Swan Creek Township in Fulton County, and a Swanton Township in Lucas County.

== Government ==
The township is governed by a three-member board of trustees, who are elected in November of odd-numbered years to a four-year term beginning on the following January 1. Two are elected in the year after the presidential election and one is elected in the year before it. There is also an elected township fiscal officer, who serves a four-year term beginning on April 1 of the year after the election, which is held in November of the year before the presidential election. Vacancies in the fiscal officership or on the board of trustees are filled by the remaining trustees.
