= Washington Township, Hocking County, Ohio =

Township in Ohio, US

- Township
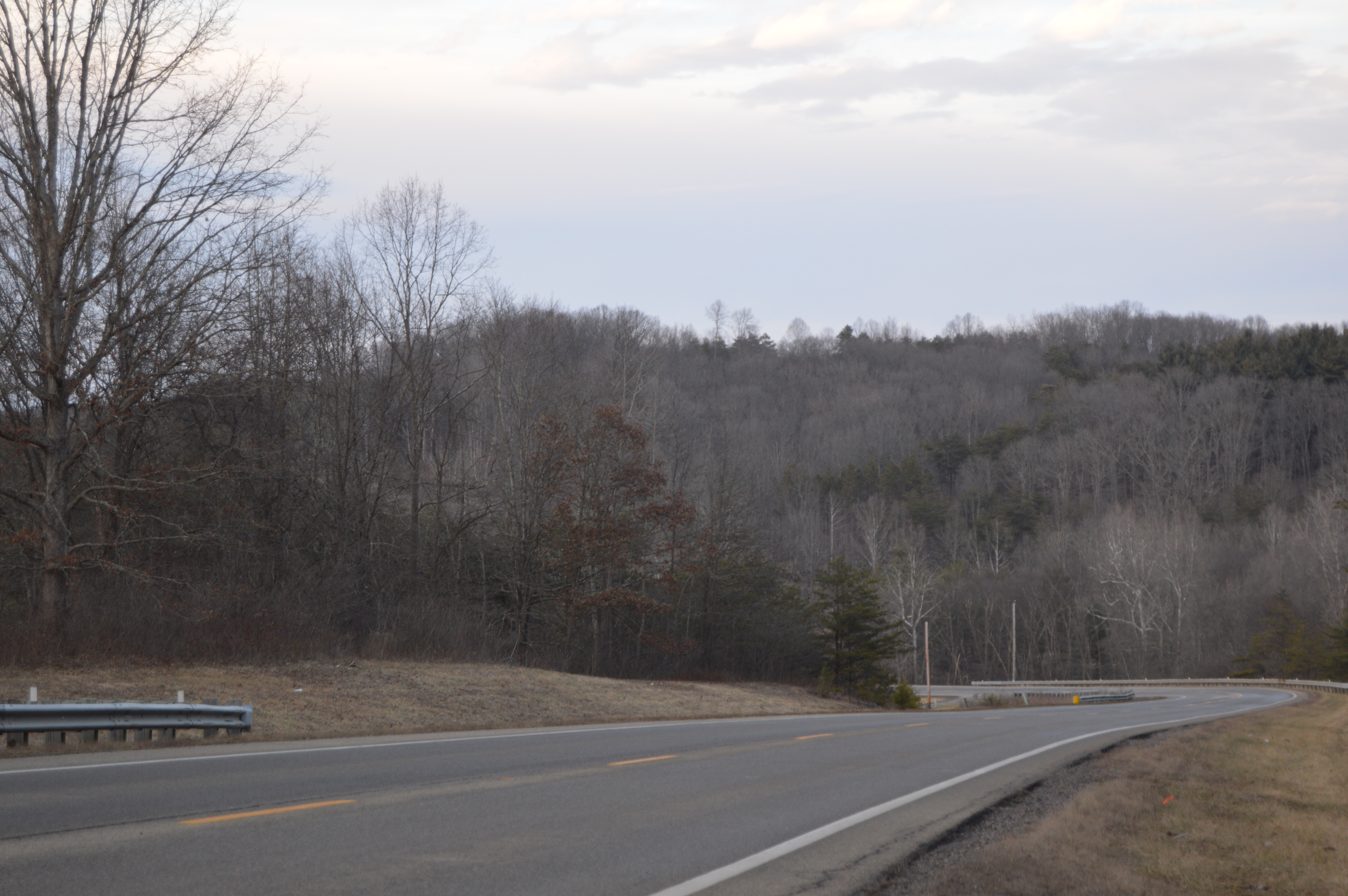
- State Route 93 north of Mount Pleasant

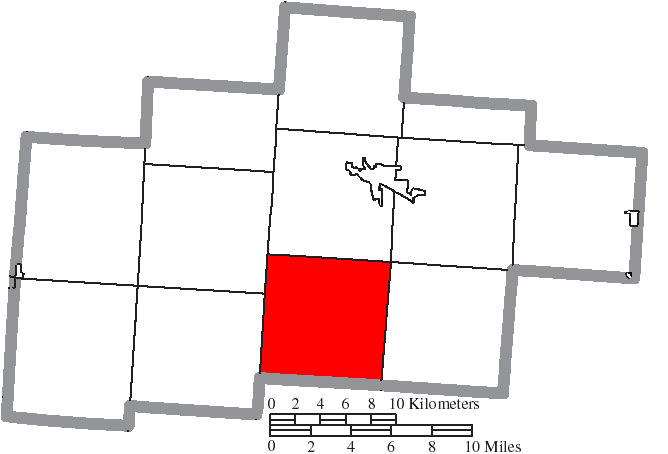
- Location of Washington Township in Hocking County
- Coordinates: 39°25′29″N 82°27′34″W
- Country: United States
- State: Ohio
- County: Hocking

Area
  - Total: 37.35 sq mi (96.73 km^{2})
  - Land: 37.28 sq mi (96.56 km^{2})
  - Water: 0.066 sq mi (0.17 km^{2})
- Elevation: 1,027 ft (313 m)

Population (2020)
  - Total: 1,131
  - Density: 30.34/sq mi (11.71/km^{2})
- Time zone: UTC-5 (Eastern (EST))
  - Summer (DST): UTC-4 (EDT)
- FIPS code: 39-81354
- GNIS feature ID: 1086326

Washington Township is one of the eleven townships of Hocking County, Ohio, United States. As of the 2020 census the population was 1,131.

== Geography ==
Located in the southern part of the county, it borders the following townships:

- Falls Township (southwestern portion) - north
- Green Township - northeast
- Starr Township - east
- Brown Township, Vinton County - southeast corner
- Swan Township, Vinton County - south
- Benton Township - west
- Laurel Township - northwest

No municipalities are located in Washington Township, but it does contain the unincorporated communities of Ewing and Ilesboro.

== Name and history ==
It is one of forty-three Washington Townships statewide.

== Government ==
The township is governed by a three-member board of trustees, who are elected in November of odd-numbered years to a four-year term beginning on the following January 1. Two are elected in the year after the presidential election and one is elected in the year before it. There is also an elected township fiscal officer, who serves a four-year term beginning on April 1 of the year after the election, which is held in November of the year before the presidential election. Vacancies in the fiscal officership or on the board of trustees are filled by the remaining trustees.
