= Hue, Ohio =

Unincorporated community in Ohio, US

Coordinates: 39°23′13″N 82°30′19″W

Hue is an unincorporated community in Swan Township, Vinton County, Ohio, in the United States.

== History ==
A post office was established at Hue in 1882, and remained in operation until 1907.
