= Monday Creek Township, Perry County, Ohio =

Township in Ohio, US

- Township
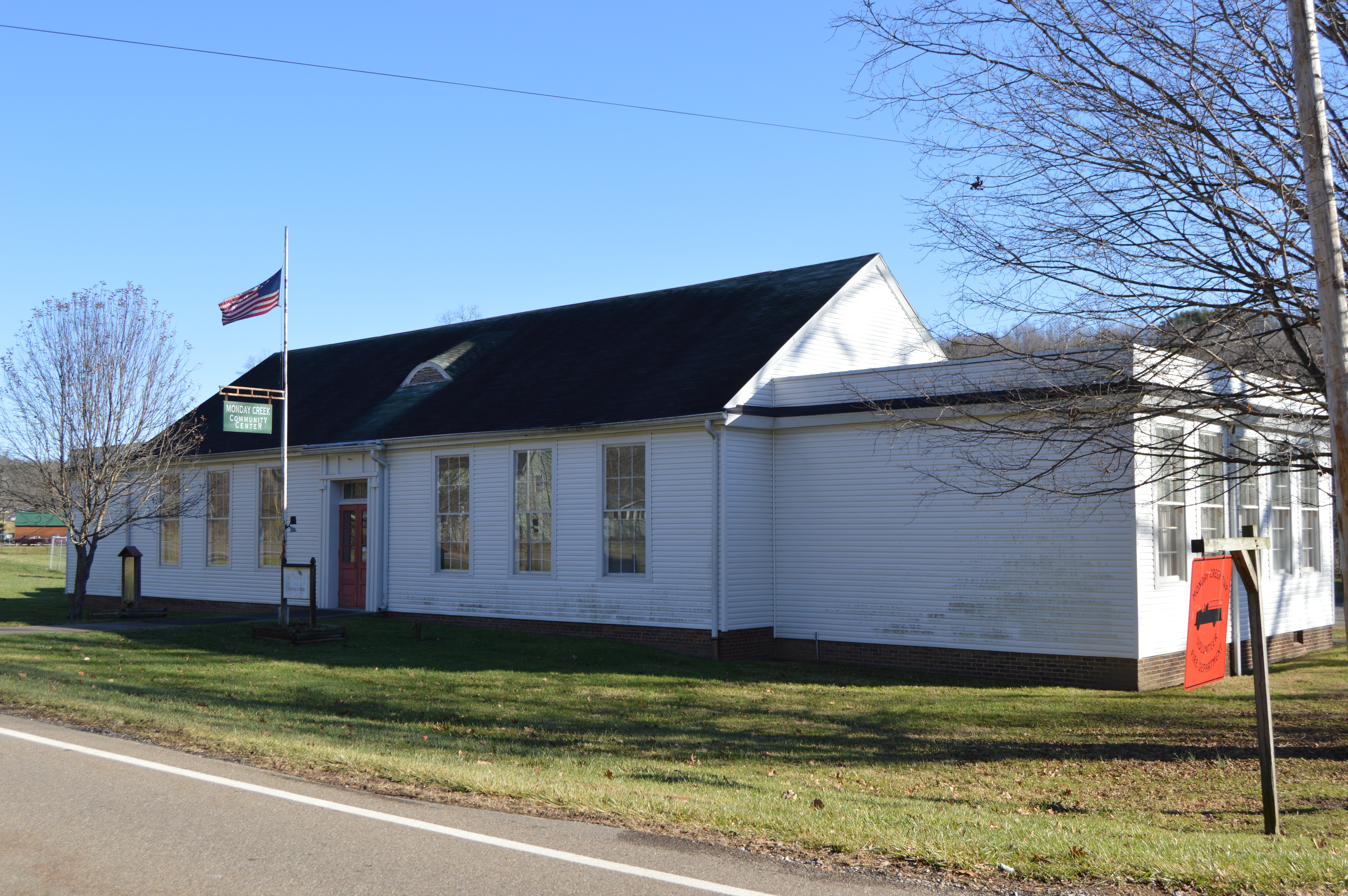
- Township community center in Maxville

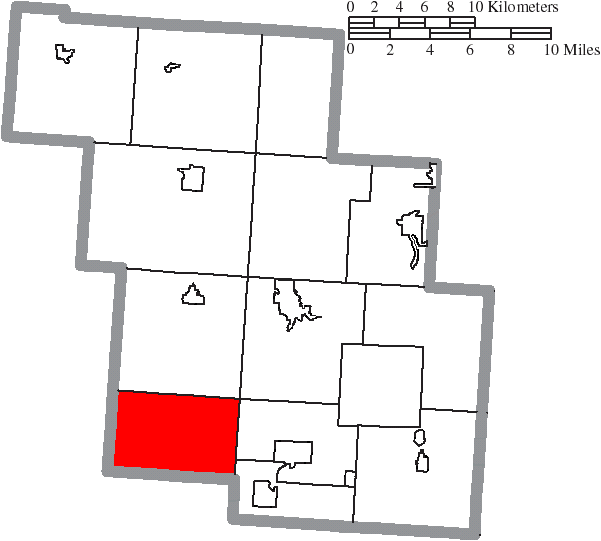
- Location of Monday Creek Township in Perry County
- Coordinates: 39°37′25″N 82°19′21″W
- Country: United States
- State: Ohio
- County: Perry

Area
  - Total: 25.3 sq mi (65.6 km^{2})
  - Land: 25.3 sq mi (65.5 km^{2})
  - Water: 0.039 sq mi (0.1 km^{2})
- Elevation: 846 ft (258 m)

Population (2020)
  - Total: 694
  - Density: 27/sq mi (10.6/km^{2})
- Time zone: UTC-5 (Eastern (EST))
  - Summer (DST): UTC-4 (EDT)
- FIPS code: 39-51198
- GNIS feature ID: 1086785

Monday Creek Township is one of the fourteen townships of Perry County, Ohio, United States. The 2020 census found 694 people in the township.

== Geography ==
Located in the southwestern corner of the county, it borders the following townships:

- Jackson Township - north
- Pike Township - northeast corner
- Salt Lick Township - east
- Coal Township - southeast
- Falls Township, Hocking County (northeastern portion) - south
- Marion Township, Hocking County - west
- Rush Creek Township, Fairfield County - northwest corner

Maxville is in the center of the township.

== Name and history ==
Monday Creek Township was organized in 1823, and named after Monday Creek. It is the only Monday Creek Township statewide.

== Government ==
The township is governed by a three-member board of trustees, who are elected in November of odd-numbered years to a four-year term beginning on the following January 1. Two are elected in the year after the presidential election and one is elected in the year before it. There is also an elected township fiscal officer, who serves a four-year term beginning on April 1 of the year after the election, which is held in November of the year before the presidential election. Vacancies in the fiscal officership or on the board of trustees are filled by the remaining trustees.
