= Carbon Hill, Ohio =

- Census-designated place
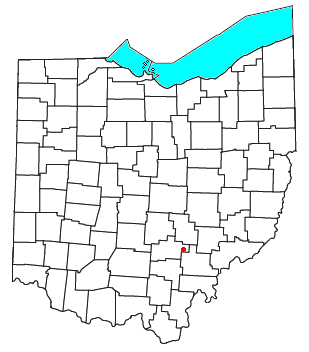
- Location of Carbon Hill, Ohio
- Coordinates: 39°30′00″N 82°14′31″W
- Country: United States
- State: Ohio
- County: Hocking
- Township: Ward

Area
  - Total: 0.41 sq mi (1.05 km^{2})
  - Land: 0.41 sq mi (1.05 km^{2})
  - Water: 0.0039 sq mi (0.01 km^{2})
- Elevation: 702 ft (214 m)

Population (2020)
  - Total: 178
  - Density: 440/sq mi (169.9/km^{2})
- Time zone: UTC-5 (Eastern (EST))
  - Summer (DST): UTC-4 (EDT)
- ZIP code: 43111
- Area code: 740
- FIPS code: 39-12056
- GNIS feature ID: 2628873

Carbon Hill is an unincorporated community and census-designated place (CDP) in central Ward Township, Hocking County, Ohio, United States. It has a post office with the ZIP code 43111. As of the 2020 census the population of the CDP was 178.

State Route 278, located on the western edge of Carbon Hill, is its main north–south street. It is 3 miles (5 km) north of Nelsonville.

== History ==
Carbon Hill was laid out in 1873. Coal (a carbon-based fuel) was extensively mined there. This industry accounts for the community's name. A post office called Carbon Hill has been in operation since 1879.

== Public services ==
The residents of Carbon Hill are served by the Nelsonville-York City School District and Nelsonville-York High School.

== Demographics ==
Historical population
Census	Pop.	Note	%±
2020	178		—
U.S. Decennial Census
