= George Deffenbaugh Mound =

Archaeological site in Ohio, United States

- U.S. National Register of Historic Places
- Nearest city: Laurelville, Ohio
- Area: 1 acre (0.40 ha)
- NRHP reference No.: 74001526
- Added to NRHP: July 15, 1974

The George Deffenbaugh Mound is a Native American mound in the southeastern part of the U.S. state of Ohio. Located northeast of Laurelville in Hocking County, the mound sits on a ridgeline; it is 6.5 feet (2.0 m) tall and approximately 50 feet (15 m) in diameter. It was first excavated at an unknown date prior to 1941; at this time, a hole was sunk from the mound's crest to its base, and a smaller hole was dug into its edge.

The mound's location and conical shape indicates that it is a work of the Adena culture, which was active between 1000 BC and AD 400. Occupation of the vicinity was not seemingly limited to the Adena period; approximately 0.3 miles (0.48 km) away from the Deffenbaugh Mound is a stone mound perhaps built by the Fort Ancient culture, perhaps more than one thousand years after the construction of the Deffenbaugh Mound.

In 1974, the Deffenbaugh Mound was listed on the National Register of Historic Places because of its potential to be a valuable archaeological site.
