= Green Township, Hocking County, Ohio =

Township in Ohio, US

- Township
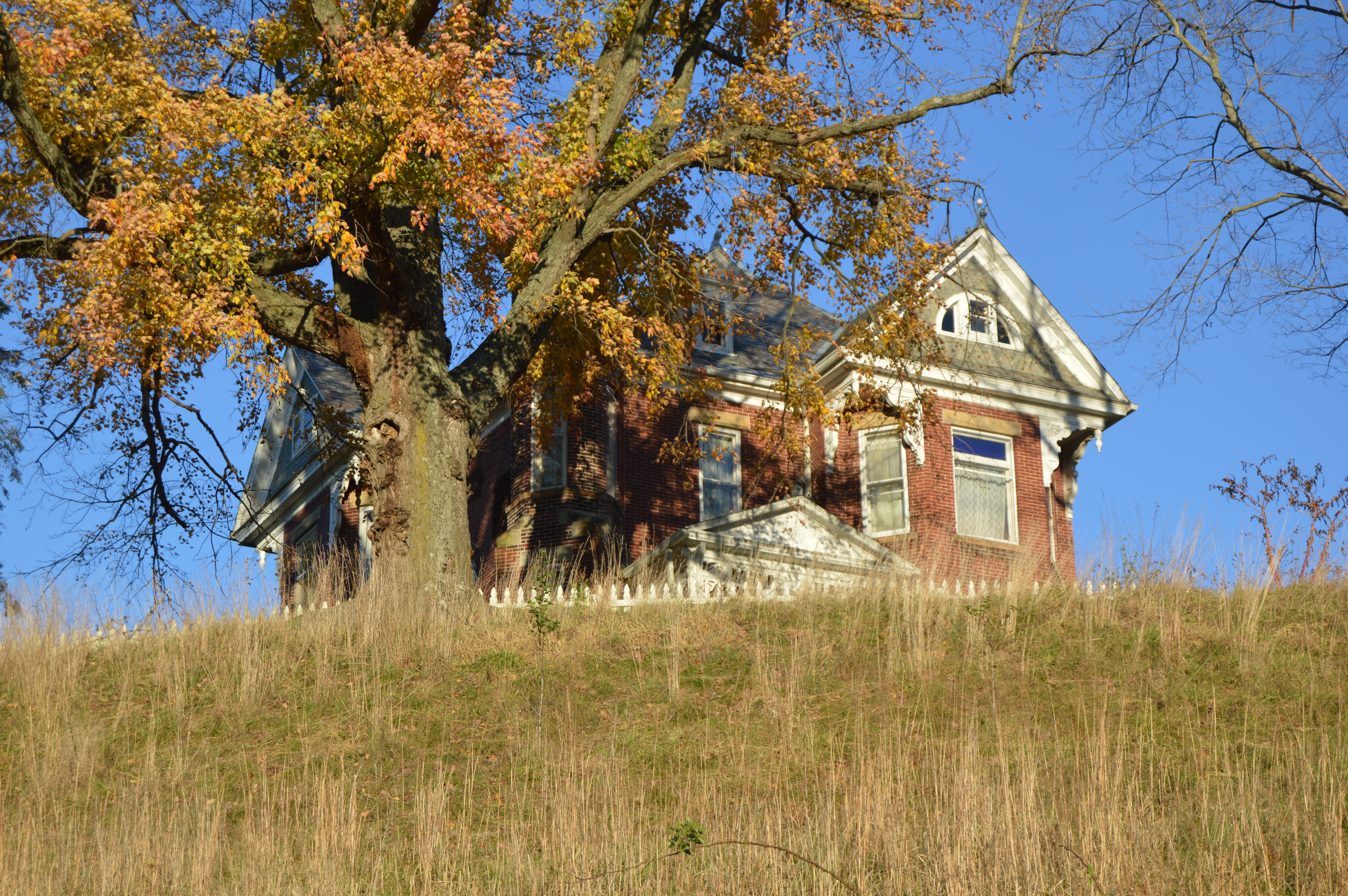
- The William H. Woodruff House, southeast of Logan

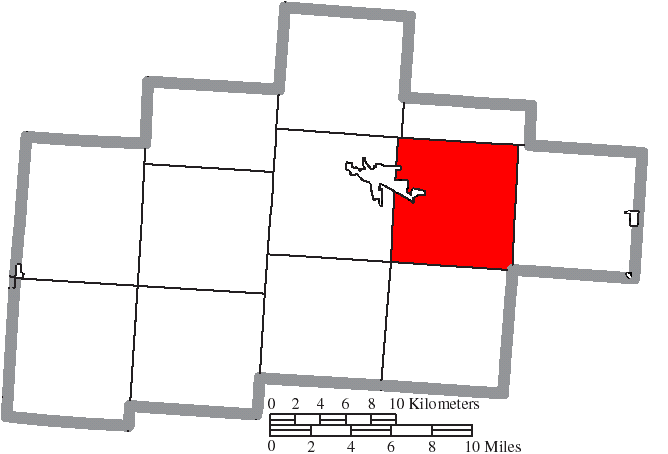
- Location of Green Township in Hocking County
- Coordinates: 39°30′42″N 82°21′9″W
- Country: United States
- State: Ohio
- County: Hocking

Area
  - Total: 37.2 sq mi (96.3 km^{2})
  - Land: 36.9 sq mi (95.5 km^{2})
  - Water: 0.31 sq mi (0.8 km^{2})
- Elevation: 922 ft (281 m)

Population (2020)
  - Total: 3,224
  - Density: 87.4/sq mi (33.8/km^{2})
- Time zone: UTC-5 (Eastern (EST))
  - Summer (DST): UTC-4 (EDT)
- FIPS code: 39-31780
- GNIS feature ID: 1086319
- Website: https://greentownship.wixsite.com/hocking

Green Township is one of the eleven townships of Hocking County, Ohio, United States. As of the 2020 census the population was 3,224.

== Geography ==
Located in the eastern part of the county, it borders the following townships:

- Falls Township (northeastern portion) - north
- Ward Township - east
- York Township, Athens County - southeast corner
- Starr Township - south
- Washington Township - southwest
- Falls Township (southwestern portion) - west
- Marion Township - northwest

Parts of the city of Logan, the county seat of Hocking County, are located in western Green Township. Southeast of Logan lies the census-designated place of Haydenville.

== Name and history ==
Green Township was organized in 1825.

It is one of sixteen Green Townships statewide.

== Government ==
The township is governed by a three-member board of trustees, who are elected in November of odd-numbered years to a four-year term beginning on the following January 1. Two are elected in the year after the presidential election and one is elected in the year before it. There is also an elected township fiscal officer, who serves a four-year term beginning on April 1 of the year after the election, which is held in November of the year before the presidential election. Vacancies in the fiscal officership or on the board of trustees are filled by the remaining trustees.
