= Buchtel, Ohio =

- Village
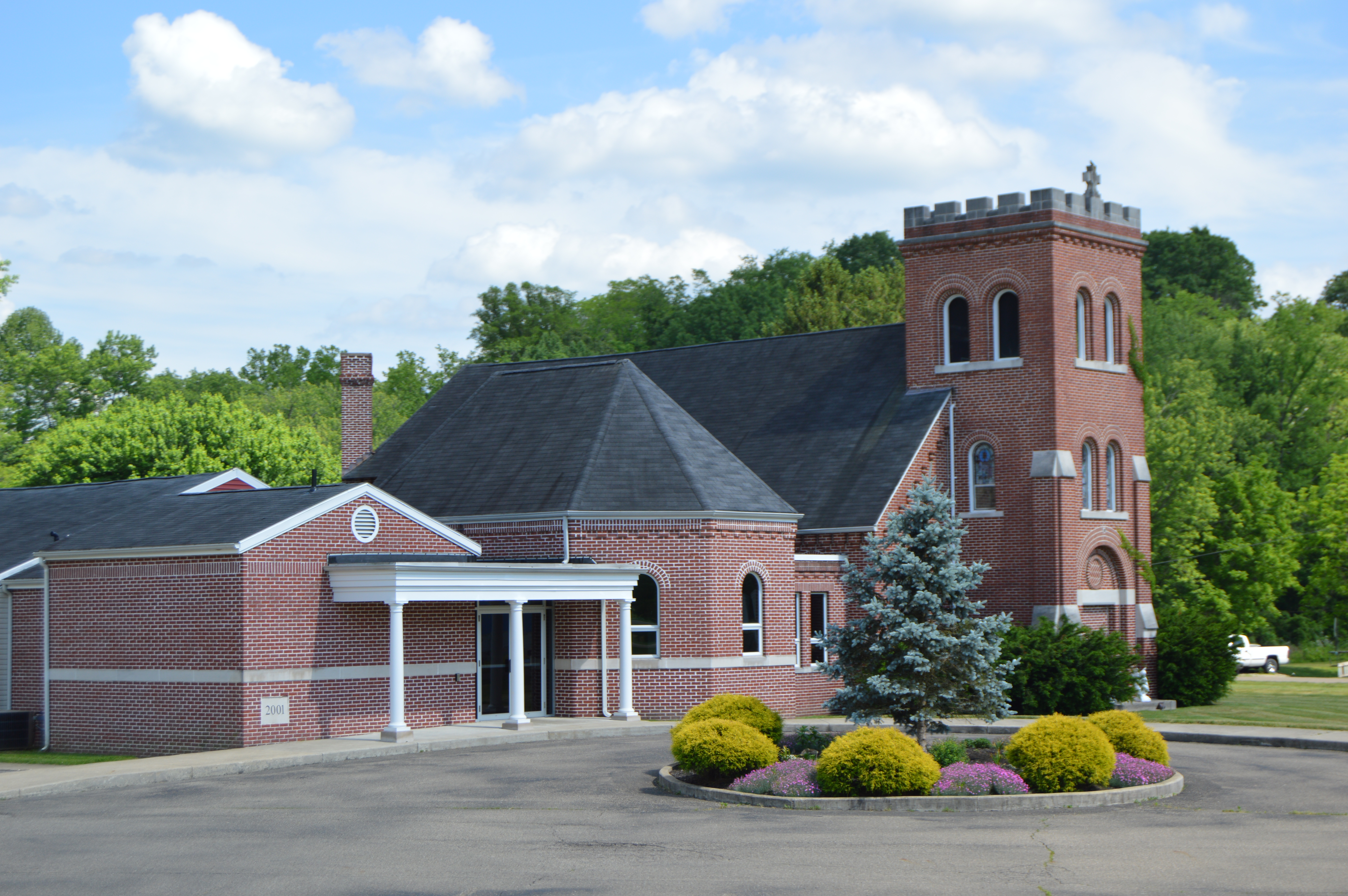
- St. Mary of the Hills Church

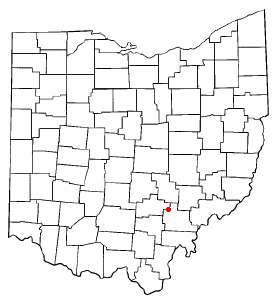
- Location of Buchtel, Ohio

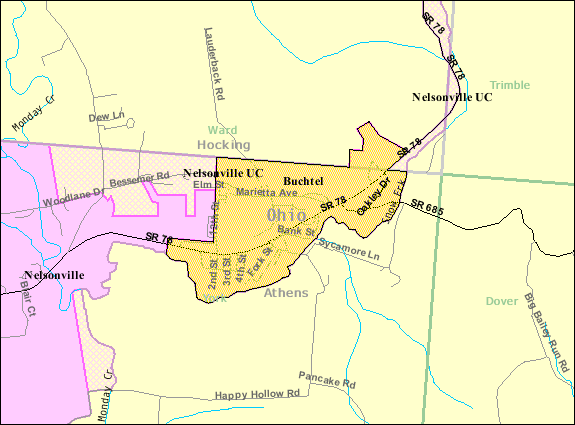
- Detailed map of Buchtel
- Coordinates: 39°27′48″N 82°10′52″W
- Country: United States
- State: Ohio
- Counties: Athens, Hocking
- Townships: York, Ward

Area
  - Total: 0.47 sq mi (1.22 km^{2})
  - Land: 0.47 sq mi (1.22 km^{2})
  - Water: 0 sq mi (0.00 km^{2})
- Elevation: 692 ft (211 m)

Population (2020)
  - Total: 518
  - Estimate (2023): 513
  - Density: 1,103/sq mi (425.9/km^{2})
- Time zone: UTC-5 (Eastern (EST))
  - Summer (DST): UTC-4 (EDT)
- ZIP code: 45716
- Area code: 740
- FIPS code: 39-09834
- GNIS feature ID: 2397481

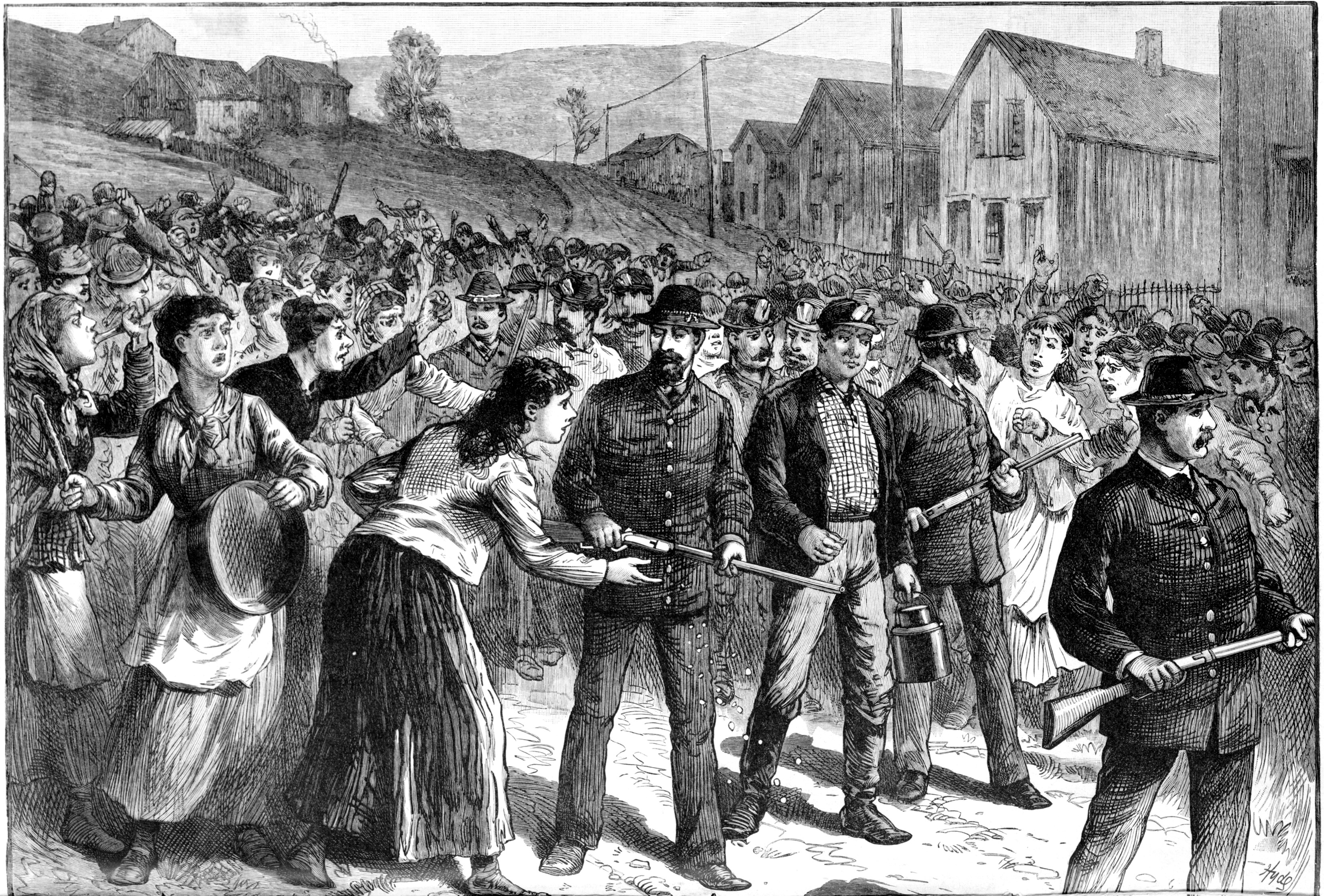
Pinkerton guards escort strikebreakers in Buchtel, Ohio, 1884

Buchtel (/ˈbʊktəl/ BUUK-təl) is a village in Athens and Hocking counties in the U.S. state of Ohio, just northeast of Nelsonville. Located in the Hocking Valley, it was a center of coal mining in the late 19th and early 20th centuries. The population was 518 at the 2020 census. A former name for the village is Bessemer.

== History ==
Buchtel was laid out in 1876, and named for John R. Buchtel, a representative of the Akron Iron Company, which owned a large amount of land in the vicinity, included within the Hocking Valley. A post office called Buchtel has been in operation since 1879.

The village was developed to support coal mining in the area. In 1884, mine workers in Buchtel went out on strike, and the company hired Pinkerton guards to protect replacement workers, known as strikebreakers or "Blacklegs". Such workers were strongly resisted by union workers, and strikes were often accompanied by violence.

== Geography ==
Buchtel is located along Snow Fork, a tributary of Monday Creek.

According to the United States Census Bureau, the village has a total area of 0.49 square miles (1.27 km^{2}), all land.

== Demographics ==
Historical population
Census	Pop.	Note	%±
1880	417		—
1910	1,180		—
1920	1,178		−0.2%
1930	799		−32.2%
1940	775		−3.0%
1950	569		−26.6%
1960	499		−12.3%
1970	592		18.6%
1980	585		−1.2%
1990	640		9.4%
2000	574		−10.3%
2010	558		−2.8%
2020	518		−7.2%
2023 (est.)	513	▼	−1.0%
U.S. Decennial Census

=== 2010 census ===
As of the census of 2010, there were 558 people, 235 households, and 152 families living in the village. The population density was 1,138.8 inhabitants per square mile (439.7/km^{2}). There were 266 housing units at an average density of 542.9 per square mile (209.6/km^{2}). The racial makeup of the village was 97.8% White, 1.1% African American, and 1.1% from two or more races. Hispanic or Latino of any race were 1.1% of the population.

There were 235 households, of which 28.9% had children under the age of 18 living with them, 47.7% were married couples living together, 12.3% had a female householder with no husband present, 4.7% had a male householder with no wife present, and 35.3% were non-families. 28.5% of all households were made up of individuals, and 12.3% had someone living alone who was 65 years of age or older. The average household size was 2.37 and the average family size was 2.84.

The median age in the village was 38 years. 21.9% of residents were under the age of 18; 10.5% were between the ages of 18 and 24; 26.1% were from 25 to 44; 26.7% were from 45 to 64; and 14.7% were 65 years of age or older. The gender makeup of the village was 48.6% male and 51.4% female.

=== 2000 census ===
As of the census of 2000, there were 574 people, 232 households, and 164 families living in the village. The population density was 1,194.2 inhabitants per square mile (461.1/km^{2}). There were 247 housing units at an average density of 513.9 per square mile (198.4/km^{2}). The racial makeup of the village was 96.86% White, 0.52% African American, 1.22% Native American, 0.17% Asian, 0.35% from other races, and 0.87% from two or more races. Hispanic or Latino of any race were 1.39% of the population.

There were 232 households, out of which 31.9% had children under the age of 18 living with them, 54.7% were married couples living together, 11.2% had a female householder with no husband present, and 28.9% were non-families. 25.0% of all households were made up of individuals, and 12.5% had someone living alone who was 65 years of age or older. The average household size was 2.47 and the average family size was 2.95.

In the village, the population was spread out, with 24.7% under the age of 18, 8.0% from 18 to 24, 30.5% from 25 to 44, 24.7% from 45 to 64, and 12.0% who were 65 years of age or older. The median age was 36 years. For every 100 females there were 92.6 males. For every 100 females age 18 and over, there were 94.6 males.

The median income for a household in the village was $27,632, and the median income for a family was $31,607. Males had a median income of $27,159 versus $18,333 for females. The per capita income for the village was $13,324. About 15.5% of families and 20.5% of the population were below the poverty line, including 21.3% of those under age 18 and 13.0% of those age 65 or over.

== Public services ==
The residents of Buchtel are served by the Nelsonville-York City School District and Nelsonville-York High School. Buchtel borders the site of the Nelsonville-York City School District campus, but the school property is located within the Nelsonville City limits. Water, Sewer, and Police Services are provided by the City of Nelsonville. Fire Services are provided by the York Township Volunteer Fire Department.

They are also served by the Athens County Public Library with branches in Albany, Athens, Chauncey, Coolville, Glouster, Nelsonville, and The Plains.
