= Redtown, Angelina County, Texas =

- Unincorporated community
- Location within Texas Location within the United States
- Coordinates: 31°24′57″N 94°56′21″W
- Country: United States
- State: Texas
- County: Angelina
- Elevation: 259 ft (79 m)
- Time zone: UTC-6 (Central (CST))
  - Summer (DST): UTC-5 (CDT)
- Area code: 936
- GNIS feature ID: 1380428

Redtown is an unincorporated community in Angelina County, in the U.S. state of Texas. According to the Handbook of Texas, the community had a population of 50 in 2000. It is located within the Lufkin, Texas micropolitan area.

== History ==
A settlement was first established in Redtown around 1900. A post office under the name "Red" was established in 1906, but was only in operation for about a year. The community had two churches and a store in the mid-1930s. Its population has since shrunk, with a population size of 50 in 2000.

== Geography ==
Redtown is located on Farm to Market Road 1819, 14 mi (23 km) west of Lufkin in western Angelina County.

== Education ==
Redtown had its own school in the mid-1930s. Today, the community is served by the Central Independent School District.
