= Falls Township, Hocking County, Ohio =

Township in Ohio, US

- Township
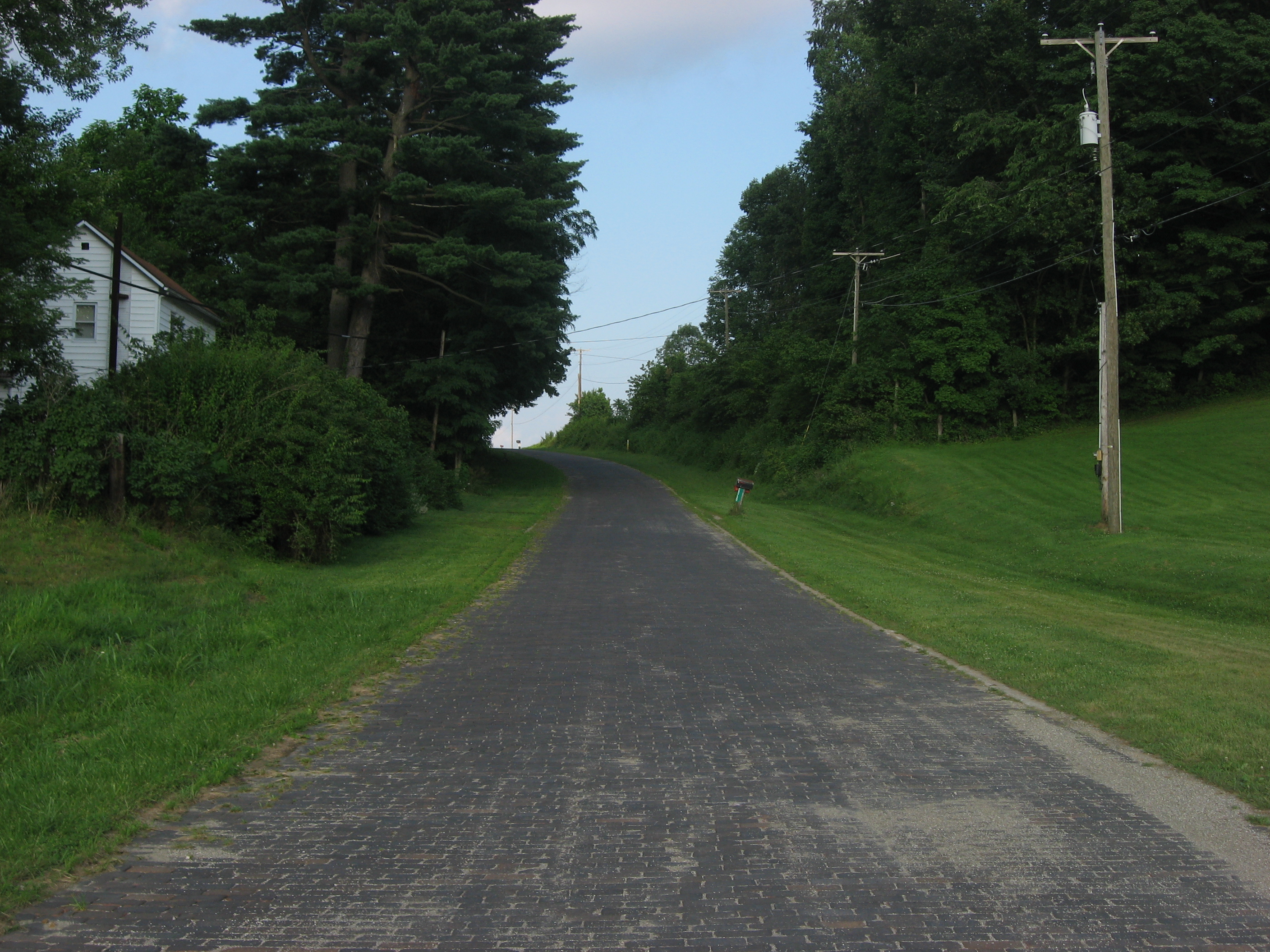
- Brick section of Enterprise-Iles Road, designated a historic site in 2002

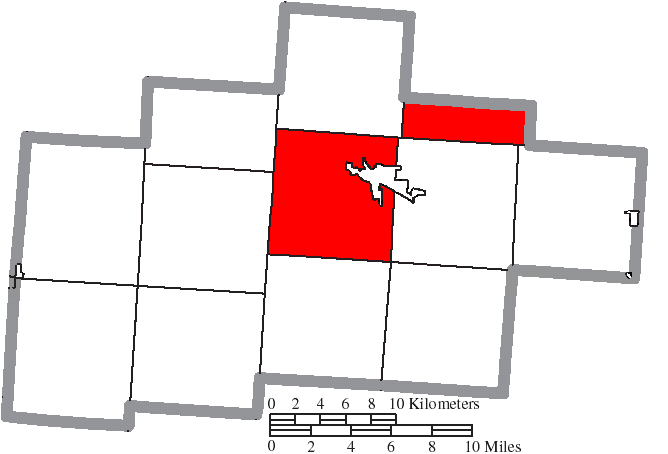
- Location of Falls Township in Hocking County
- Coordinates: 39°32′35″N 82°24′35″W
- Country: United States
- State: Ohio
- County: Hocking

Area
  - Total: 50.1 sq mi (129.8 km^{2})
  - Land: 49.3 sq mi (127.8 km^{2})
  - Water: 0.77 sq mi (2.0 km^{2})
- Elevation: 728 ft (222 m)

Population (2020)
  - Total: 11,886
  - Density: 240.9/sq mi (93.00/km^{2})
- Time zone: UTC-5 (Eastern (EST))
  - Summer (DST): UTC-4 (EDT)
- FIPS code: 39-26488
- GNIS feature ID: 1086317

Falls Township is one of the eleven townships of Hocking County, Ohio, United States. As of the 2020 census the population was 11,886.

== Geography ==
Falls Township consists of two disconnected portions in the center and northeast of the county, separated by a short distance. While many Ohio townships are composed of disjointed pieces due to municipal annexations, separation only by other townships is very uncommon.

Its northeastern portion (known as The Gore, or simply Gore) borders the following townships:

- Monday Creek Township, Perry County - north
- Coal Township, Perry County - east
- Ward Township - southeast
- Green Township - south
- Marion Township - west

Its southwestern portion borders the following townships:

- Marion Township - north
- Green Township - east
- Starr Township - southeast
- Washington Township - south
- Laurel Township - west
- Good Hope Township - northwest

The majority of the city of Logan, the county seat of Hocking County, is located in the southwestern portion of Falls Township.

== Name and history ==
Falls Township takes its name from a waterfall on the Hocking River, where a mill had been built in 1814, prior to the township's formation.

Statewide, the only other Falls Township is located in Muskingum County.

== Government ==
The township is governed by a three-member board of trustees, who are elected in November of odd-numbered years to a four-year term beginning on the following January 1. Two are elected in the year after the presidential election and one is elected in the year before it. There is also an elected township fiscal officer, who serves a four-year term beginning on April 1 of the year after the election, which is held in November of the year before the presidential election. Vacancies in the fiscal officership or on the board of trustees are filled by the remaining trustees.
