= Starr Township, Hocking County, Ohio =

Township in Ohio, US

- Township
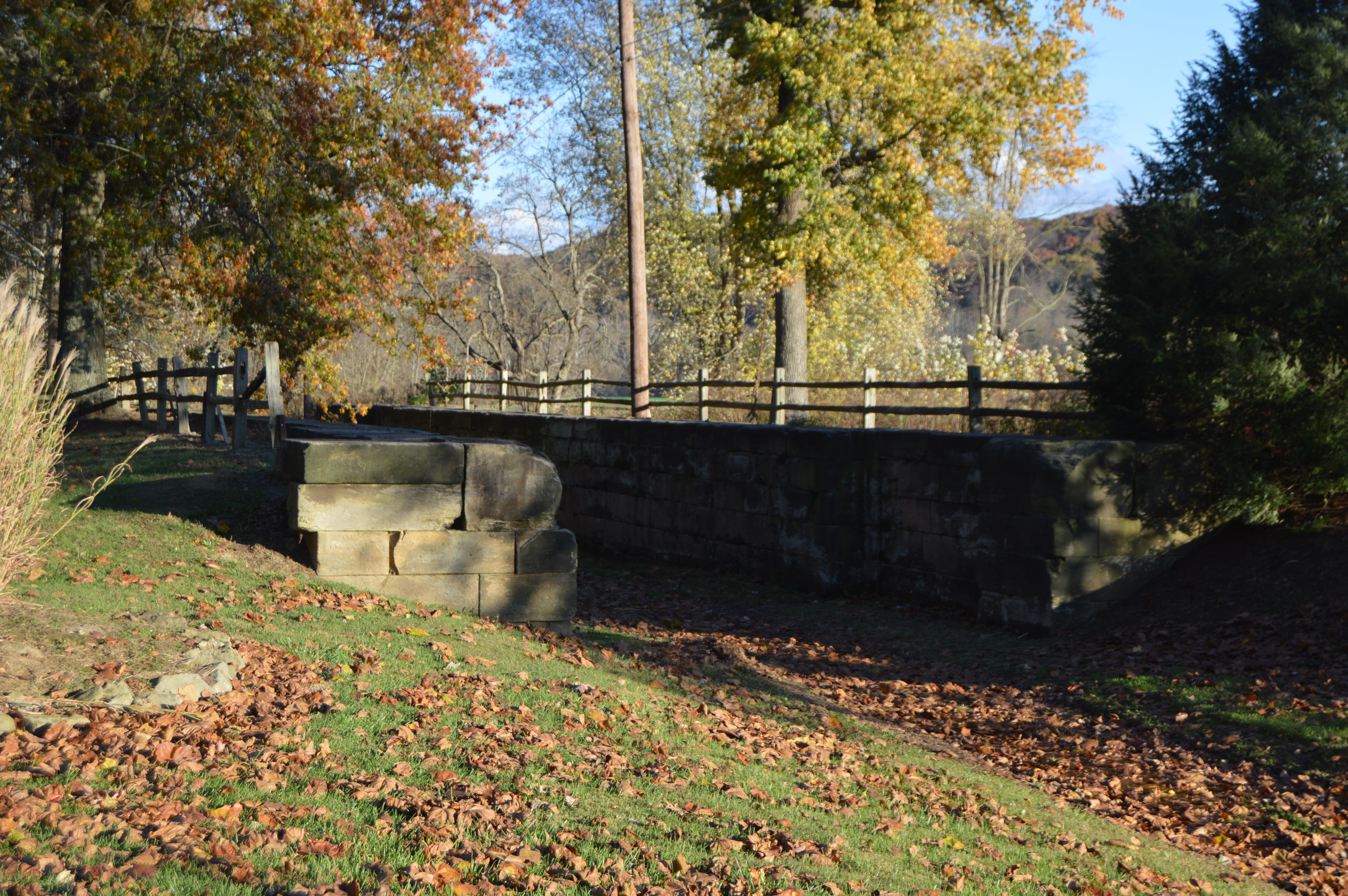
- Hocking Canal Lock #19, west of Nelsonville

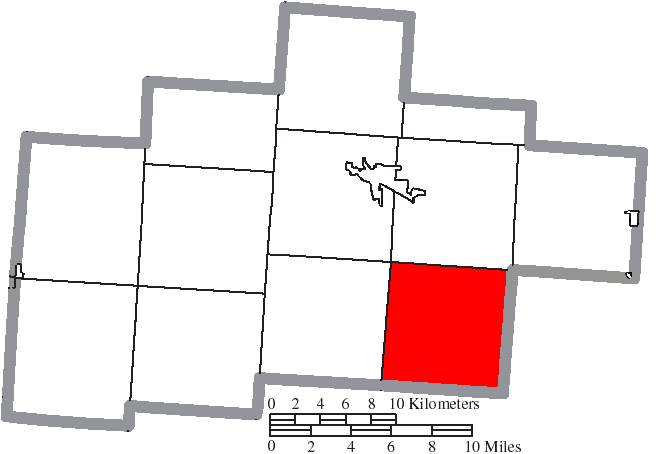
- Location of Starr Township in Hocking County
- Coordinates: 39°26′33″N 82°19′49″W
- Country: United States
- State: Ohio
- County: Hocking

Area
  - Total: 36.91 sq mi (95.59 km^{2})
  - Land: 36.62 sq mi (94.84 km^{2})
  - Water: 0.29 sq mi (0.74 km^{2})
- Elevation: 978 ft (298 m)

Population (2020)
  - Total: 1,455
  - Density: 39.73/sq mi (15.34/km^{2})
- Time zone: UTC-5 (Eastern (EST))
  - Summer (DST): UTC-4 (EDT)
- FIPS code: 39-74405
- GNIS feature ID: 1086324

Starr Township is one of the eleven townships of Hocking County, Ohio, United States. As of the 2020 census the population was 1,455.

== Geography ==
Located in the southeastern corner of the county, it borders the following townships:

- Green Township - north
- Ward Township - northeast corner
- York Township, Athens County - east
- Waterloo Township, Athens County - southeast corner
- Brown Township, Vinton County - south
- Swan Township, Vinton County - southwest corner
- Washington Township - west
- Falls Township (southwestern portion) - northwest corner

No municipalities are located in Starr Township, although the unincorporated community of Union Furnace lies in the central part of the township.

== Name and history ==
Starr Township was named for Joseph Starr, a pioneer settler who was instrumental in that township's organization.

It is the only Starr Township statewide.

== Government ==
The township is governed by a three-member board of trustees, who are elected in November of odd-numbered years to a four-year term beginning on the following January 1. Two are elected in the year after the presidential election and one is elected in the year before it. There is also an elected township fiscal officer, who serves a four-year term beginning on April 1 of the year after the election, which is held in November of the year before the presidential election. Vacancies in the fiscal officership or on the board of trustees are filled by the remaining trustees.
