= Jacksonville, Ohio =

- Village
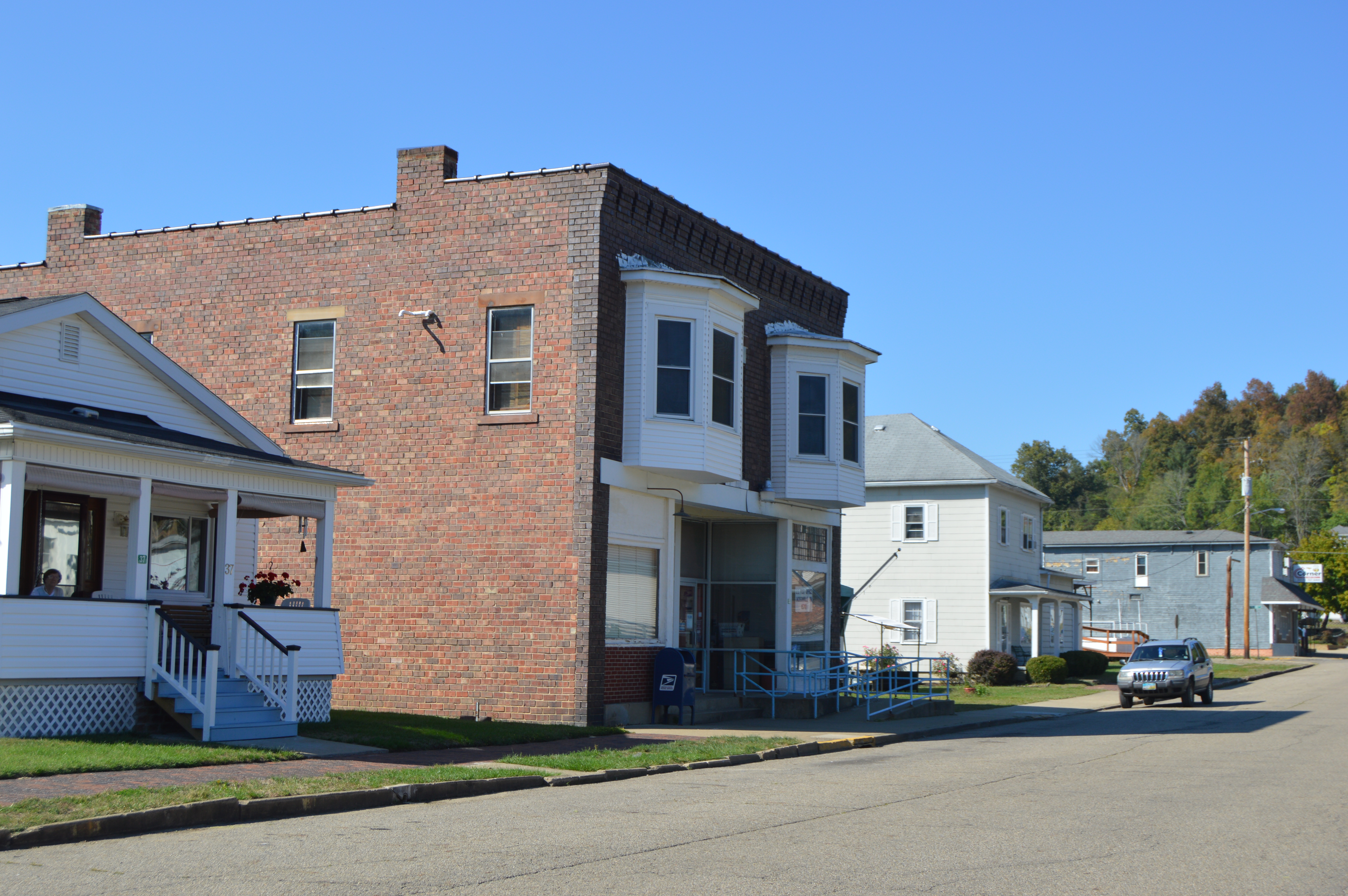
- Sixth Street south of Main Street

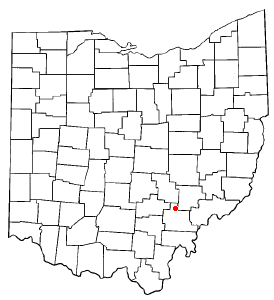
- Location of Jacksonville, Ohio

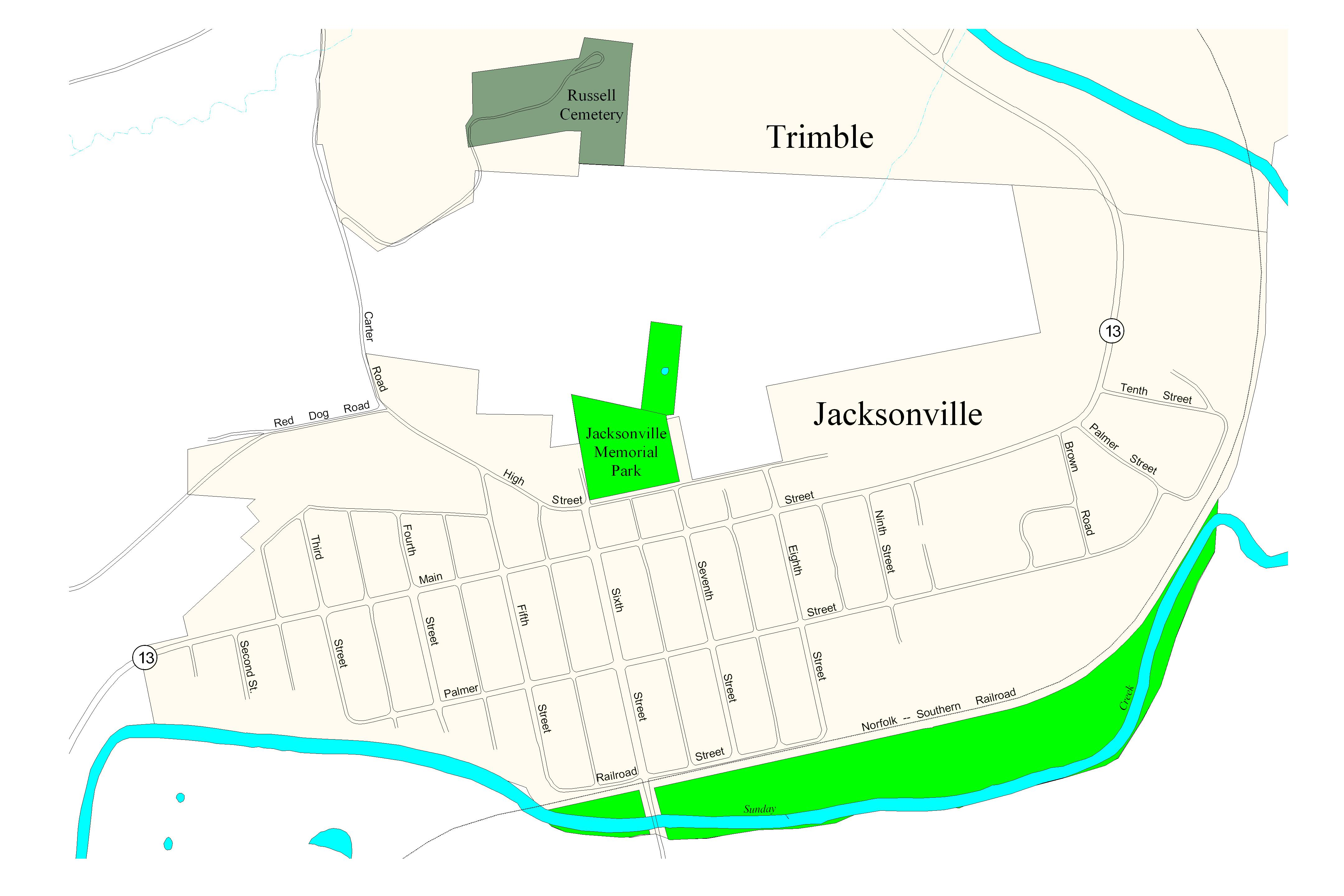
- Street-level map of Jacksonville
- Coordinates: 39°28′34″N 82°04′47″W
- Country: United States
- State: Ohio
- County: Athens
- Township: Trimble

Area
  - Total: 0.25 sq mi (0.64 km^{2})
  - Land: 0.24 sq mi (0.62 km^{2})
  - Water: 0.0039 sq mi (0.01 km^{2})
- Elevation: 705 ft (215 m)

Population (2020)
  - Total: 400
  - Density: 1,666.3/sq mi (643.37/km^{2})
- Time zone: UTC-5 (Eastern (EST))
  - Summer (DST): UTC-4 (EDT)
- ZIP code: 45740
- Area code: 740
- FIPS code: 39-38304
- GNIS feature ID: 2398288
- Website: jacksonvilleoh.com

Jacksonville is a village in Athens County, Ohio, United States. The population was 400 at the 2020 census.

== History ==
Jacksonville was laid out in 1879 by Oliver D. Jackson, for whom the village is named. A post office began operating in 1884 and continues to serve the community today.

During its early years, the village grew around coal mining and small‑business enterprises. Many residents commuted along nearby Sunday Creek, which supported several mines in the area.

== Geography ==
Jacksonville is located along Sunday Creek.

According to the United States Census Bureau, the village has a total area of 0.24 square miles (0.62 km^{2}), all land.

== Demographics ==
Historical population
Census	Pop.	Note	%±
1890	727		—
1900	1,047		44.0%
1910	1,285		22.7%
1920	1,046		−18.6%
1930	880		−15.9%
1940	812		−7.7%
1950	657		−19.1%
1960	580		−11.7%
1970	545		−6.0%
1980	651		19.4%
1990	544		−16.4%
2000	544		0.0%
2010	481		−11.6%
2020	400		−16.8%
U.S. Decennial Census

=== 2010 census ===
As of the census of 2010, there were 481 people, 204 households, and 131 families living in the village. The population density was 2,004.2 inhabitants per square mile (773.8/km^{2}). There were 240 housing units at an average density of 1,000.0 per square mile (386.1/km^{2}). The racial makeup of the village was 96.9% White, 0.6% African American, and 2.5% from two or more races.

There were 204 households, of which 30.4% had children under the age of 18 living with them, 45.6% were married couples living together, 12.7% had a female householder with no husband present, 5.9% had a male householder with no wife present, and 35.8% were non-families. 31.4% of all households were made up of individuals, and 18.6% had someone living alone who was 65 years of age or older. The average household size was 2.36 and the average family size was 2.90.

The median age in the village was 42.5 years. 19.5% of residents were under the age of 18; 9.9% were between the ages of 18 and 24; 23.9% were from 25 to 44; 28.3% were from 45 to 64; and 18.3% were 65 years of age or older. The gender makeup of the village was 47.8% male and 52.2% female.

=== 2000 census ===
As of the census of 2000, there were 544 people, 221 households, and 140 families living in the village. The population density was 2,118.1 inhabitants per square mile (817.8/km^{2}). There were 246 housing units at an average density of 957.8 per square mile (369.8/km^{2}). The racial makeup of the village was 97.61% White, 0.37% Native American, and 2.02% from two or more races. Hispanic or Latino of any race were 0.55% of the population.

There were 221 households, out of which 32.1% had children under the age of 18 living with them, 48.9% were married couples living together, 11.3% had a female householder with no husband present, and 36.2% were non-families. 31.7% of all households were made up of individuals, and 15.4% had someone living alone who was 65 years of age or older. The average household size was 2.46 and the average family size was 3.09.

In the village, the population was spread out, with 26.5% under the age of 18, 7.2% from 18 to 24, 30.1% from 25 to 44, 21.7% from 45 to 64, and 14.5% who were 65 years of age or older. The median age was 37 years. For every 100 females there were 85.0 males. For every 100 females age 18 and over, there were 84.3 males.

The median income for a household in the village was $24,018, and the median income for a family was $30,556. Males had a median income of $26,500 versus $17,188 for females. The per capita income for the village was $13,900. About 20.1% of families and 24.5% of the population were below the poverty line, including 43.3% of those under age 18 and 5.2% of those age 65 or over.

== Public services ==
The residents of Jacksonville are served by the Trimble Local School District and Trimble High School in Glouster. They are also served by the Athens County Public Library with branches in Albany, Athens, Chauncey, Coolville, Glouster, Nelsonville, and The Plains.
