= Edith Ross Mound =

Archaeological site in Ohio, United States

- U.S. National Register of Historic Places
- Nearest city: Laurelville, Ohio
- Area: 0.1 acres (0.040 ha)
- NRHP reference No.: 73001481
- Added to NRHP: June 18, 1973

The Edith Ross Mound is a Native American mound and archaeological site in the southeastern part of the U.S. state of Ohio. Located near the village of Laurelville in Hocking County, the mound is a circular structure that measures 40 feet (12 m) in diameter at its base and 4.6 feet (1.4 m) high at the center. It is constructed primarily of earth, with large stones placed on various parts of the surface. Few changes have been made to the mound since white settlement of the region; a small depression in the northwestern corner may be the result of someone digging, but no significant damage was done.

The Ross Mound is important primarily for its archaeological value. The land surrounding the mound has yielded large numbers of archaeological artifacts, and a concentration of stones on the western edge of the mound's surface suggests that a grave or wall was once located there. The essentially pristine condition of the mound guarantees that any burials and grave goods placed in the mound at the time of its construction is still buried within. Because no systematic excavation has been undertaken of the mound, its contents and its builders are uncertain. Archaeologists are certain that it is a burial mound, but the date and culture are unknown: possible candidates for the builders are the Adena, Hopewell, or Fort Ancient cultures, and it could have been built as early as 1000 BC or as late as AD 1000.

In recognition of the Edith Ross Mound's archaeological value, it was listed on the National Register of Historic Places in 1973; it is one of four Hocking County archaeological sites on the Register.
