= Nelsonville Music Festival =

Annual festival in Nelsonville, Ohio, USA

Coordinates: 39°27′32.15″N 82°14′3.95″W

- Genre: soul, acoustic, country, folk, psychedelic, bluegrass, jam bands, rock and more
- Location: Nelsonville, Ohio United States
- Years active: 2005–2019, 2021, 2022, 2023
- Founders: Stuart's Opera House
- Website: Official website

The Nelsonville Music Festival is an annual four-day music festival located at Snow Fork near Nelsonville, Ohio. The event in Southeastern Ohio takes place in July and features a variety of musical genres and includes local, regional, national and international artists. The weekend celebration includes local food and artisans as well as a campground for both primitive and RV camping. The festival also provides activities for children and strives to be environmentally friendly.

== History ==
The first Nelsonville Music Festival was held on July 23, 2005 on the square in the downtown Nelsonville Historic Arts District in Nelsonville, Ohio. The first event included six bands and a crowd of around 750 people, as well as artisans from the region. The festival is produced by Stuart's Opera House, a historic non-profit theatre. All proceeds of the event go towards keeping Stuart's Opera House in operation. The festival was started as an opportunity to bring more people to Nelsonville and served as revitalization of the arts district. The second and third year, the festival was held in a field behind Rocky Boots, a popular shoe outlet headquartered in the town. After three years as a one-day event, the festival was expanded to become a three-day event and was moved to the Historic Village of Robbins Crossing at Hocking College. The festival has since added a fourth day and expanded to feature more than 60 bands and a crowd of upwards of 7,000 in 2014.

== Features ==
=== Stages ===
Performance areas include the Main Stage, the Porch Stage, the Boxcar Stage, the Camp Stage and the No-Fi Cabin, which is located inside of a small, historic, one-room schoolhouse with no electricity. The performers at the No-Fi Cabin play acoustic sets for a small audience of less than 100 people.

=== Vendors ===
Vendors at the event include local and regional artisans, food, and workshops. There is a food court on site, as well as a beer garden. Locally grown organic food is available as well as handmade drums, jewelry, art, and soap. Students of Hocking College have the opportunity to sell their own artwork and crafts.

=== Environmentalism ===
Partnered with Rural Action, the festival strives to be zero waste by implementing recycling, composting, and education. Reusable cups are available for one dollar, which can be used for beer or free water. Attendees can refill their water bottle or cup at a provided station equipped with a water filtration device.

=== Children's activities ===
The festival offers free passes to children 12 and under. Teens 13-17 can purchase a discounted ticket. There are numerous activities available for children, including an area for children to listen to and create their own music and musical instruments, and puppets for a puppet parade. There is a kids stage which features workshops and performances all three days of the festival and a project for a community mural.

=== Volunteers ===
Anyone over the age of 18 may volunteer to work at the festival, though there is currently a waiting list. Eight hours of volunteering will earn a weekend pass to the festival. Volunteers may work in several areas, including: admissions, art vendors, camping, recycling, merchandise, volunteer check-in, ground control, greeter/information area, floaters, and more.

== Past performers ==
=== 2005 ===
The inaugural Nelsonville Music Festival was held on July 23, 2005. The event featured performances by Dirty Dozen Brass Band, The Derailers, The Royales, The Carpenter Ants and Slaughter Drive.

=== 2006 ===
The second annual Nelsonville Music Festival took place on July 29, 2006. Performers included Todd Snider, Brave Combo and Leon Redbone.

=== 2007 ===
The third annual Nelsonville Music Festival took place on July 14, 2007. Performers included Squirrel Nut Zippers, Brave Combo, Erin McKeown, Bakelite 78 and Hillbilly Idol.

=== 2008 ===
The fourth annual Nelsonville Music Festival took place from May 16–18, 2008, marking the first time the event featured three days of music. Performers included The Avett Brothers, Bettye LaVette, Akron/Family, Justin Townes Earle, Red Stick Ramblers, Michael Hurley, O'Death, Southeast Engine, Uncle Monk, Dawn Landes, Woody Pines & the Lonesome Two, Wailin' Elroys, Silo Circuit, Casual Future, Nostra Nova, Sarah White, Moviola, Justin Gordon, Born Old, Zeb Dewar, The Billycats and Weedghost.

=== 2009 ===
The fifth annual Nelsonville Music Festival took place from May 15–17, 2009. Performers included Willie Nelson, Mudhoney, Jolie Holland, T-Model Ford and Wayne Hancock.

=== 2010 ===
The sixth annual Nelsonville Music Festival took place from May 14–16, 2010. Performers included Loretta Lynn, The Swell Season, Sharon Jones & The Dap-Kings, Todd Snider, Man Man, Billy Joe Shaver, Black Joe Lewis & the Honeybears, Michael Hurley, Those Darlins, Detroit Cobras and Buffalo Killers.

=== 2011 ===
The seventh annual Nelsonville Music Festival took place from May 13–15, 2011. The event featured more than 50 acts, including The Flaming Lips, George Jones, Neko Case, Yo La Tengo, Wanda Jackson, Justin Townes Earle, Over the Rhine, The Ghost of a Saber Tooth Tiger, Lost in the Trees, Bomba Estereo, Mucca Pazza, The Growlers, Michael Hurley, Drakkar Sauna, Baby Dee, Doug Paisley, Ned Oldham & Old Calf, Southeast Engine, The Honeycutters, Y La Bamba, The Spikedrivers, Sgt. Dunbar & the Hobo Banned, Samantha Crain, Chooglin', Cheyenne Marie Mize, The Black Swans, Mount Carmel, Wheels on Fire, Nick Tolford & Company, Black Owls, Duke Junior & the Smokey Boots, She Bears, Whale Zombie, Scubadog, Jerry DeCicca, Eve Searls, Matt Moore, The Shazzbots, Flyaway Saturn, Chris Biester, Weedghost, The Lovesick Blues, The Dragline Brothers, Octopus & Owl, Shelby Carter, Rattletrap Stringband, Bruce & Gay Dalzell, Bill Wagner & Brett Burleson, Zeb Dewar, and Elemental Revolver.

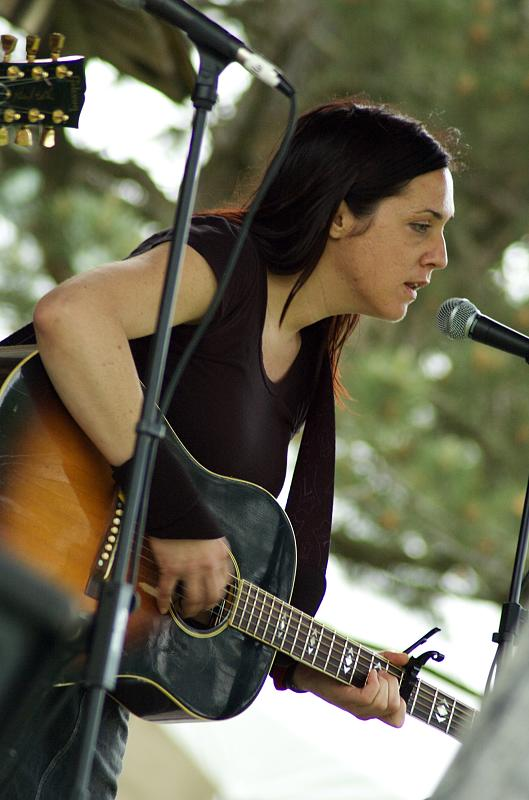
Sarah White appears at Nelsonville Music Festival in Nelsonville, Ohio on May 17, 2008.

=== 2012 ===
The eighth annual Nelsonville Music Festival took place from May 18–20, 2012. Performers included Iron and Wine, Andrew Bird, M. Ward, Lee "Scratch" Perry, Roky Erickson, Todd Snider, Dawes, Charles Bradley & His Extraordinaires, Kurt Vile & the Violators, Hayes Carll, Those Darlins, Dark Dark Dark, Lee Ranaldo Band, Sallie Ford and the Sound Outside, Horse Feathers, Flying Clouds of South Carolina, Michael Hurley, Mucca Pazza, Shovels & Rope, Black Bananas, Hope for Agoldensummer, Greg Ashley Band, Woody Pines, Southeast Engine, Mount Moriah, Todd Burge, The Old Fashioneds, Wheels on Fire, Matt Bauer, and Debris Upon the Forest Floor.

There were 18 artists from Ohio, including Guided by Voices, Jorma Kaukonen, Jessica Lea Mayfield, R.Ring, Shivering Timbers, Old Hundred, The Tillers, Time & Temperature, Ohio University Symphony Orchestra, The Shazzbots, Makebelieves, The D-Rays, Sport Fishing USA, Hex Net, Hunnabee & the Sandy Tar Boys, State Park, Angela Perley & the Howling Moons and Boxcar Burlesque.

=== 2013 ===
The ninth annual Nelsonville Music Festival took place from May 30-June 2, 2013, marking the first time the festival expanded to four days. Headliners included Wilco, Cat Power, John Prine, Gogol Bordello, Mavis Staples and Sharon Van Etten.

=== 2014 ===
The 10th annual Nelsonville Music Festival took place from May 29-June 1, 2014. Headliners included a return performance by The Avett Brothers, along with Dinosaur Jr., Shovels & Rope, The Head and the Heart, Kurt Vile & The Violators and Jason Isbell.

=== 2015 ===
The 11th annual Nelsonville Music Festival took place from May 28–31, 2015. Headliners included a return performance by The Flaming Lips, as well as St. Vincent, Merle Haggard, Trampled By Turtles, Built To Spill and Brandi Carlile.

=== 2016 ===
The 12th annual Nelsonville Music Festival took place from June 2–5, 2016. Headliners included Randy Newman, Gillian Welch, Courtney Barnett, Mac Demarco, Tallest Man of Earth and Lake Street Dive. Gary Clark Jr. was originally scheduled as a headliner but had to cancel his performance because of family issues.

=== 2017 ===
The 13th annual Nelsonville Music Festival took place from June 1–4, 2017. Headliners included Ween, They Might Be Giants, Emmylou Harris, Conor Oberst, Jenny Lewis and Sixto Rodriguez.

=== 2018 ===
The 14th annual Nelsonville Music Festival took place from May 31-June 3, 2018. Headliners included George Clinton & Parliament Funkadelic, The Decemberists, Ani DiFranco, The Black Angels, Tune-Yards and Tank and the Bangas.

=== 2019 ===
The 15th annual Nelsonville Music Festival took place from June 6–9, 2019. Headliners included The Breeders, Tyler Childers, Mavis Staples, Death Cab for Cutie, Oh Sees, The Wood Brothers, Mandolin Orange and Julia Jacklin.

=== 2022 ===
The 16th annual Nelsonville Music Festival took place from 2–4 September 2022 in a new location just outside of Nelsonville. Headliners included Japanese Breakfast, Mdou Moctar, Yo La Tengo, Neko Case and Angel Olsen. Lucinda Williams and Shannon and the Clams were originally scheduled to perform, but had to drop out.
