= Matt Kmosko =

American footballer (born 1972)

Personal information
- Full name: Matthew W. Kmosko
- Date of birth: January 8, 1972 (age 54)
- Place of birth: Ship Bottom, New Jersey, United States
- Height: 6 ft 1 in (1.85 m)
- Position: Defender

Youth career
- 1990–1994: Hartwick College

Senior career*
Years	Team	Apps	(Gls)
1995	New York Fever		
1995–1996	Cincinnati Silverbacks (indoor)	22	(0)
1996–1997	Colorado Rapids	67	(1)
1998	Miami Fusion	29	(0)
1999	Columbus Crew	14	(0)

International career
1992	United States	3	(0)
- * Club domestic league appearances and goals

Matthew W. Kmosko (born January 8, 1972, in Ship Bottom, New Jersey) is a former U.S. soccer defender who played three and a half seasons in Major League Soccer. He also earned three caps with the U.S. national team in 1992. In January 2023, he was criminally convicted of aggravated menacing in the Athens County Municipal Court for threatening student-worker Caden Cox at Hocking College in Nelsonville, Ohio.

== High school and college ==
Kmosko attended Southern Regional High School in Ocean County, New Jersey. He graduated in 1990 and entered Hartwick College. Kmosko played on the Hartwick soccer team from 1990 to 1994. He was a team captain his senior year and finished his four-year career with a 41-27-8 record. He was inducted into the Hartwick Athletic Hall of Fame in 1995.

== Minor leagues ==
The Buffalo Blizzard of National Professional Soccer League drafted Kmosko in 1994, but he did not sign with them. In 1995, he began his professional career with the USISL New York Fever where he earned Northeast Division Rookie of the Year. That winter, he joined an NPSL team, the Cincinnati Silverbacks instead of signing with the Blizzard.

== MLS ==
=== Colorado Rapids ===
In February 1996, the Colorado Rapids of Major League Soccer selected Kmosko in the 7th round (62nd overall) of the league's Inaugural Player Draft. He spent the next two seasons with the Rapids. However, at the end of the 1996 season, the Rapids loaned out Kmosko for two exhibition games. On November 7, 1996, the team sent him to the Rapids farm team, the Raleigh Flyers (USISL), for an exhibition match with Trinidad and Tobago. Later that month, the Rapids loaned him to fellow MLS team Dallas Burn for an exhibition match with the El Salvador national team. In 1997, Kmosko was an integral part of the Rapids team which went to the MLS championship game where it lost 2–1 to D.C. United. Kmosko started and played the entire game.

=== Miami Fusion ===
In 1997, MLS prepared to expand the number of teams in the league for the 1998 season. As part of this process, the league ran an expansion draft. The Miami Fusion selected Kmosko with the eighteenth pick draft and he played twenty-nine games in 1998 with the Fusion.

=== Columbus Crew ===
The Mutiny traded Kmosko to the Columbus Crew for a first round 2000 MLS College Draft pick. While Kmosko began the season well, playing in fourteen games, he suddenly and unexpectedly left the team. The Crew waived Kmosko at the end of the season. On February 24, 2000, the Mutiny selected Kmosko off waivers, but waived him on March 16, 2000. There has been no official or public explanation for the end of Kmosko's playing career.

== National team ==
Kmosko earned three caps with the U.S. national team while still in college. His first game came in a scoreless tie with Costa Rica on February 12, 1992. Six days later, he played in a 2–0 loss to El Salvador. His last cap came on September 3, 1992, when he came on for Fernando Clavijo in a 2–0 win over Canada.

In 1993, he was a member of the U.S. team at the World University Games.

== Legal issues ==
Following complaints of harassment by multiple student-workers under his supervision, Kmosko resigned from his position as the soccer coach and coordinator of the college's Student Center and Campus Recreation Office at Hocking College in Nelsonville, Ohio. In May 2022, Kmosko threatened a student-worker, Caden Cox, who has Down syndrome, with a knife in the bathroom of the Student Center. As a result of this incident, Kmosko was subsequently convicted of menacing in the Athens County Municipal Court.
