= Caden Cox =

American football player (born 1999)

Personal information
- Born: June 7, 1999 (age 27)

Career information
- College: Hocking College, Nelsonville, Ohio

Caden Cox (born June 7, 1999) is an American former college football kicker at Hocking College in Nelsonville, Ohio, United States. He is the first known college football player with Down syndrome to play and score in an official game.

== Early life ==
Various members of Cox's family had been football kickers prior to him; his father, Kevin, for Middle Tennessee, and his uncle for Virginia Tech. His older brother Zane has kicked for both Hocking College and University of Tennessee at Martin.

In addition to football, Cox has a black belt in Taekwondo, several medals in swimming, and earned medals at the Special Olympics.

Prior to attending college, he had played football at Fremont Ross High School where he had been awarded Player of the Game for his senior season homecoming game.

== Career ==
On September 11, 2021, Cox played in a football game on the team of the Hocking College Hawks against Sussex Community College, making him the first person with Down syndrome to play in as well as score a point in an NCAA or NJCAA college football game. He kicked three additional goals throughout the season. His jersey number was 21, alluding the extra copy of the 21st chromosome that causes Down syndrome.

Cox also became the first student athlete at Hocking College to join a name, image, and likeness (NIL) contract with a local business, establishing a contract with Rocky Brands in September 2021.

On June 6, 2022, Cox inked a NIL deal with Jake Max, an apparel brand focused on people with disabilities.

Cox graduated from Hocking College in December 2022. As of 2026, Cox is working with the Ohio State Buckeyes football program.

== Lawsuit against Hocking College ==
In May 2023, Cox filed a federal lawsuit against Hocking College's president Betty Young, soccer coach Matthew Kmosko, and other unnamed employees at the college. Cox alleged that Kmosko had subjected him to repeated derogatory comments and abusive verbal harassment, took his phone and looked through it without Cox's permission, as well as threatening him with a knife at the bathroom at the college's Student Center in May 2022. Following the incident, Kmosko resigned from the college and was convicted of menacing in the Athens County Municipal Court and spent at 30 days in jail.

A $30,000 settlement was reached on April 4, 2024, with Hocking College giving no admission of wrongdoing and with a stipulation that Cox would never be employed by the college again.

== In popular culture ==
Cox is the focus of the upcoming 2026 film 21 Down. He is portrayed in the film by Dashiell Meier, with Ashley Judd playing his mother Mari Cox.

Cox has an exhibit at the College Football Hall of Fame.
