= Vas-Y Eddy =

Song by Jean Saint-Paul
- B-side: "Quand Paris Sourit"
- Released: 1967
- Genre: Schlager
- Label: Philips
- Songwriters: Betty Young, Jean Saint-Paul

Vas-Y Eddy (C'mon Eddy) is a 1967 Belgian song by Jean Saint-Paul about Belgian cycling champion Eddy Merckx. Its lyrics were written by Betty Young and the B-side, Quand Paris Sourit (When Paris Smiles) by Claude Bonheur and Jean Saint-Paul. It was released by the label Philips Records.

The song praises Eddy Merckx' victories and is notable for being the first recorded song about Merckx.
