= Erica Terwillegar =

American luger

Personal information
- Born: April 8, 1963 (age 63) Nelsonville, Ohio, United States

Sport
- Sport: Luge

Erica Terwillegar (born April 8, 1963) is an American luger. She competed at the 1988 Winter Olympics and the 1992 Winter Olympics.

She is also known for her penchant for squatting in luxury apartments, having been sued for unpaid rent twice in New York City.
