= Hocking Valley Railway =

Railroad in Ohio, United States

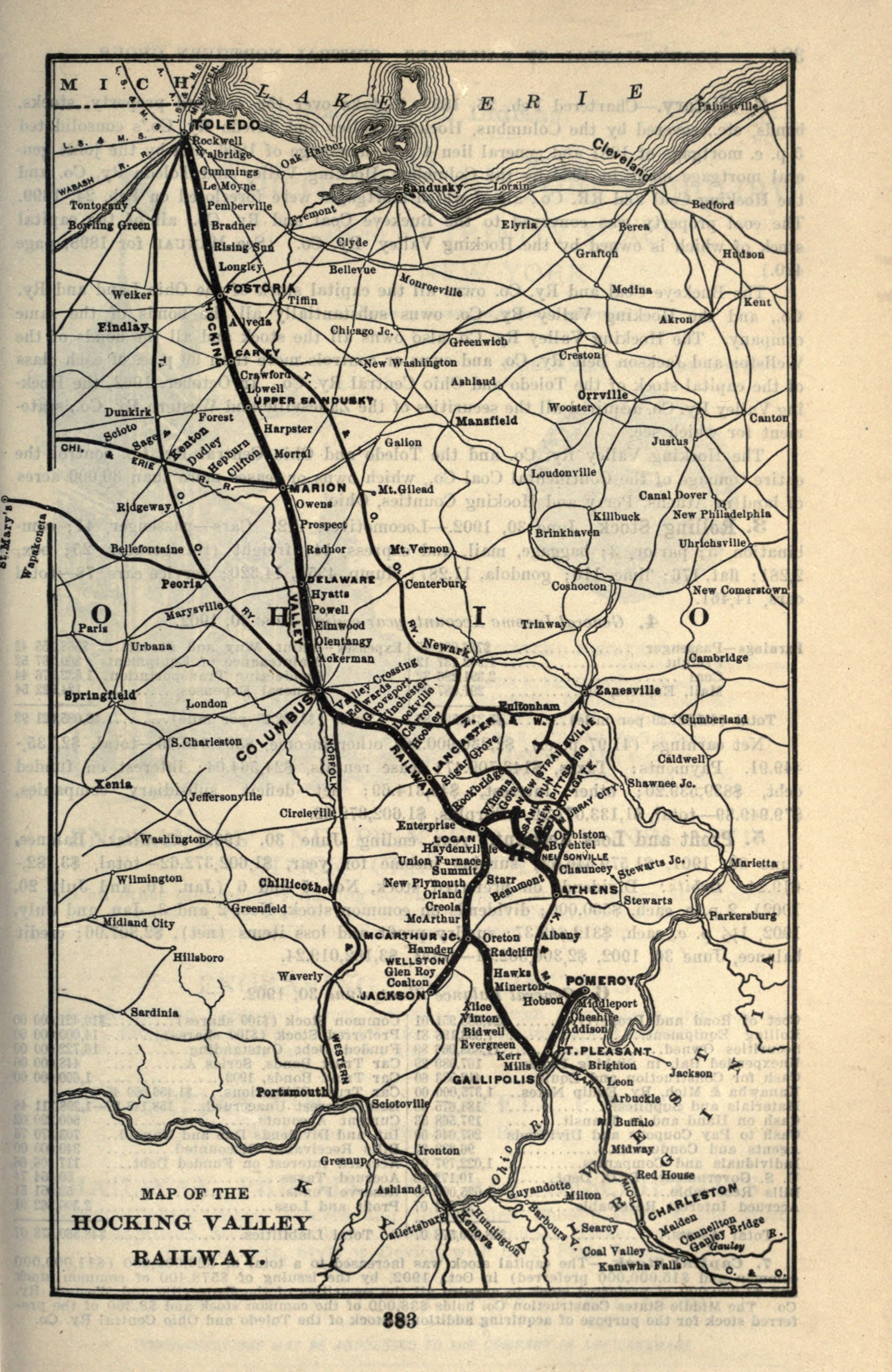
- 1903 Hocking Valley Railway Map

Overview
- Reporting mark: HV
- Dates of operation: 1899–1930
- Successor: Chesapeake and Ohio Railway

Technical
- Track gauge: 4 ft 8 1/2 in (1,435 mm) standard gauge
- Previous gauge: 4 ft 9 1/2 in

The Hocking Valley Railway (reporting mark HV) was a railroad in the U.S. state of Ohio, with a main line from Toledo to Athens and Pomeroy via Columbus. It also had several branches to the coal mines of the Hocking Valley near Athens. The company became part of the Chesapeake and Ohio Railway system in 1910, and the line between Toledo and Columbus continues to see trains as CSX Transportation's Columbus Subdivision. Portions of the main line south of Columbus are now operated by the Indiana and Ohio Railway and Hocking Valley Scenic Railway.

At the end of 1925, HV operated 349 miles of road on 881 miles of track; that year it reported 2614 million ton-miles of revenue freight and 25 million passenger-miles.

== History ==
The earliest predecessor of the Hocking Valley was the Mineral Railroad, incorporated in April 1864 to build from Athens in the rich Hocking Valley to Columbus. The company changed its name to the Columbus and Hocking Valley Railroad in June 1867, shortly after construction began at Columbus, and the line opened for business from Columbus to Lancaster on January 20, 1869, Logan on August 28, 1869, Nelsonville on September 17, 1869, and Athens on July 25, 1870. The first branch, from Logan east to New Straitsville, was completed in January 1871, and the railroad completed a cutoff from Nelsonville north alongside Monday Creek to the Straitsville Branch in 1880. Several more branches reached additional mines in the Logan-Nelsonville area, including along Snow Fork (initially incorporated in July 1875 as the Snow Fork Valley Railroad) to Orbiston (1877), Murray City (1882), and Coalgate (1893), and along Brush Fork to New Pittsburg (1877–78). In 1879, William G. Deshler was elected as a member of the railroad's board.

The Columbus and Toledo Railroad was incorporated in May 1872 to connect its namesake cities on an eastern route through Delaware, Marion, Upper Sandusky, and Fostoria. Construction, delayed by the Panic of 1873, began in August 1875, and the line was opened from Columbus to Marion on November 1, 1876, and the rest of the way to Walbridge, outside Toledo, on January 11, 1877. Trackage rights were acquired over the Toledo and Woodville Railroad (a Pennsylvania Railroad subsidiary) to reach Toledo, including a dock on the Maumee River to handle Hocking Valley coal and iron ore.

The final piece of the system was incorporated in March 1870 as the Gallipolis, McArthur and Columbus Railroad, which would build from Gallipolis on the Ohio River to Logan. It acquired part of an incomplete roadbed graded in the 1850s by the Scioto and Hocking Valley Railroad between Hamden and Logan, but was unable to survive the Panic of 1873. The Columbus and Gallipolis Railway, incorporated in July 1876, tried to complete the line on an extended route to Columbus, but ran out of funds, and yet another company, the Ohio and West Virginia Railway, was incorporated in May 1878 to continue construction. The north end was moved back to Logan a year later, and construction began in July 1879, now allied with the Columbus and Hocking Valley. Operation over the full route commenced on October 15, 1880, and a branch alongside the river to Pomeroy was completed in January 1881.

The three companies merged in August 1881 to form the Columbus, Hocking Valley and Toledo Railway, which stretched across the state from Toledo to Pomeroy. A short extension near Toledo was built in 1890, connecting to the Lake Shore and Michigan Southern Railway (a New York Central Railroad subsidiary) at Rockwell Junction. The new company entered receivership in February 1897 and was reorganized in February 1899 as the Hocking Valley Railway, which came under the control of a syndicate in December 1902. The stock was distributed among several railroad companies in June 1903, with one-third going to the Pittsburgh, Cincinnati, Chicago and St. Louis Railway (Pennsylvania Railroad) and one-sixth each to the Baltimore and Ohio Railroad, Chesapeake and Ohio Railway (C&O), Lake Shore and Michigan Southern Railway (New York Central Railroad), and Erie Railroad. The C&O gained control in March 1910, and initially used the Kanawha and Michigan Railway to make the connection from Charleston, but in 1917 it opened the first piece of the Northern Subdivision, which joined the main line at Limeville with Norfolk and Western Railway trackage rights to Columbus, and in 1927 a separate line to Columbus was completed. When the C&O acquired control of the Pere Marquette Railway in 1929, the Hocking Valley served as its connection to the rest of the system. Finally, the Hocking Valley was merged into the C&O in April 1930.

A small branch railroad was organized in 1903 as the Athens, Amesville and Chauncey Railway. Its trackage was 3.65 miles in 1907, and 5.99 miles in 1908. It was built expressly to service coal mines in the Sugar Creek valley north of Athens, Ohio, and connected to the Hocking Valley Railway mainline just northwest of Athens. It was built by coal interests, but operated by the Hocking Valley Railway, and was merged into it in 1911. This line never ventured anywhere near Amesville or Chauncey, and did not even technically connect to Athens. After the merger, it was known as the Sugar Creek Branch.

== See also ==
- Crush, Texas
