= Hocking Valley Scenic Railway =

Coordinates: 39°27′35.95″N 82°14′2.32″W

Overview
- Headquarters: 33 West Canal Street; P.O. Box 427; Nelsonville, Ohio 45764
- Reporting mark: HVSR
- Locale: Nelsonville, Ohio from Nelsonville, Athens County to Logan, Hocking County, Ohio
- Dates of operation: 1972–present
- Predecessor: Chesapeake & Ohio Railway

Technical
- Track gauge: 4 ft 8 1/2 in (1,435 mm) standard gauge
- Length: 12 miles (19 km)

Other
- Website: http://www.hvsry.org/

- Hocking Valley Railway Historic District
- U.S. National Register of Historic Places
- U.S. Historic district
- Location within Ohio Location within the United States
- Location: Roughly between Bridge #494 in Logan and Bridge #629 in Nelsonville, Nelsonville, Ohio
- Area: 162.4 acres (65.7 ha)
- Built: 1869
- Architect: Hocking Valley Railway; Et al.
- Architectural style: Second Empire
- NRHP reference No.: 88000451
- Added to NRHP: May 5, 1988

The Hocking Valley Scenic Railway (reporting mark HVSR) is a non-profit, 501c3, volunteer-operated tourist railroad attraction that operates out of Nelsonville, Athens County, Ohio. It is also located near the popular Hocking Hills State Park in nearby Hocking County. It uses former trackage of the Chesapeake & Ohio Railway, which was in turn originally Hocking Valley Railway trackage. The current operation was founded in 1972.

== General Information ==
Most of the trackage used by the railway is known as the Hocking Valley Railway Historic District, and has been placed on the National Register of Historic Places for Athens County, Ohio. The trackage was once owned by the Hocking Valley Railway, which eventually became part of the Chesapeake & Ohio Railway. The HVSR began operating trains with steam locomotive 2-8-0 No. 33 built for the Lake Superior & Ishpeming in 1916, and operated over the former Monday Creek Branch to Carbon Hill. Today, the tourist trains operate along the former C&O Armitage Subdivision between Nelsonville and a point just east of Logan, Ohio.

== History ==
=== 1864 to 1930 ===
The current route's origins can be traced to April 1864, when the Mineral Railroad was chartered to build a railroad line between Columbus and Athens, a distance of about 72 miles. Little was done until 1867 when the Mineral Railroad was renamed the Columbus & Hocking Valley Railroad. The line was completed in sections between 1868 and 1870, when the first passenger train operated between the two cities on July 25, 1870. The main commodity hauled by the C&HV was coal, with clay products and related materials right behind. The C&HV eventually became part of the new Columbus, Hocking Valley and Toledo Railroad with the merger of the Columbus and Toledo Railroad and Ohio and West Virginia Railway in 1881. This new system spanned from the Lake Erie port of Toledo through Columbus to Athens and a branch to the Ohio River cities of Gallipolis and Pomeroy. In time, the CHV&T was reorganized as the Hocking Valley Railway in 1899, and existed as such until May 1930, when the Chesapeake & Ohio Railway merged the railroad into its system to create the Hocking Division.

=== C&O Years ===
Passenger service was eventually discontinued on December 31, 1949. By this point, the coal business was fading south of Columbus, and the C&O was busy operating many trains on the Columbus-Toledo portion (which connected to the C&O's mainline through [West Virginia] with the Lake Erie). Over time, freight business was down to a single branch line local train, the "Nelsonville Turn", which finally was discontinued around 1980.

=== Starting Out: Laying the Foundation ===
By this time, the Hocking Valley Scenic Railway had been operating over seven miles of the old Monday Creek Branch to Carbon Hill from Nelsonville since 1972. The HVSR had been created by three men: Frank L. McCauley, Ted Goodman, and Jerry Ballard. It was initially to be the "Salt Creek" railroad, as they had intentions of purchasing the abandoned Detroit, Toledo and Ironton Railroad line that operated into Wellston, Ohio. During this time, they had managed to purchase three former Erie Railroad commuter coaches, piecing together two of them to be able to transport passengers. However, before details of the railroad line itself could be finalized, a scrapper had bought the line for salvage. But just in time, they were notified of the Monday Creek line and its impending scrapping. This they were able to purchase before it was too late, purchasing it from the scrapper himself. Before all of this, however, they had already purchased a steam locomotive in 1968, former Lake Superior and Ishpeming 2-8-0 No. 33 and were working on its restoration at the C&O's Yard A in Columbus.

=== Monday Creek and the 1970s ===
The first "station" of the Hocking Valley Scenic was a tarp stretched across four poles. Later on, a small building was donated. Eventually, the final structure used as a depot on the same site (near the intersection of State Route 691 and U.S. 33) was an original Hocking Valley Railway train order office originally located in Lancaster, Ohio at the crossing of the Pennsylvania Railroad and the HV. During the early 1970s, once the season was completed for the year, the 33 would be moved to the C&O's Parson Yard roundhouse during the winter for storage and maintenance. It wouldn't be until 1976 that the locomotive would be kept in the HVSR's own (first) engine house in Nelsonville. This engine house was constructed by Bonanza Polebarn Company. Tracks were laid to the structure by the HVSR's own volunteers, with the assistance of a C&O surveyor. The work was done between 1975 and 1976, and was the first new track installed by HVSR crews and the first indoor shop facility owned by the railroad. Materials for the track to the shop were donated, coming from a spur in Logan. The early years were rough financially, and in order to make a bank payment, the "Lost Run spur" was scrapped to keep up. It was also during the late 1970s that the HVSR's Santa Claus trains began operating.

=== Transition Years: The 1980s ===
Starting around 1980, the Hocking Valley Scenic began moving operations toward Athens. This was a time of transition between the Monday Creek and the former C&O Armitage Subdivision remnant south of Nelsonville. Trains were operated from the old Monday Creek station site, backed to the main line, and then operated round trip south to Glen Ebon. However, the HVSR trains never made it to Athens before the focus shifted north. Trains began using the present station site at 33 West Canal Street, which is near the original passenger station and freight house sites (both already razed), in 1981. At the end of 1981, the railroad's first diesel arrived, former U.S. Army 45-ton switcher No. 7318. The present depot, based on a Hocking Valley prototype once located in Rising Sun, Ohio, was constructed in 1982. Architect Ted Goodman designed the structure, with funding and land provided by the Baird Trust Foundation. Trees used for the lumber were donated by local attorney Mike Nolan, and the lumber was milled by Hocking Technical College. (The lumber mill is now gone, and the site is now occupied by the Hocking College Public Safety Services building.) The station's building contractor was Denver Stump. It was also in 1982 that two more steam locomotives arrived, donated by American Electric Power: 0-6-0 No. 3 and "fireless" 0-4-0 No. 2. (It wouldn't be until 2003 that No. 3 was moved into the shop to begin restoration efforts.) The locomotives had previously been on display at the Muskingum Electric Railroad. The Monday Creek Branch was finally scrapped in 1983.

=== Looking North to Logan ===
As the C&O and its parent company CSX began moving out of the market south of Columbus, it was becoming apparent that in order to maintain a connection to the outside world by rail, the railroad would have to look north. With that, the rest of the Armitage Subdivision was acquired piecemeal between just east of Logan and Nelsonville. The HVSR began operating trains to East Clayton and eventually Diamond (both once homes to large brick plants) by 1985. By the late 1980s and early 1990s, the trains were running over the present route between East Logan and Nelsonville, with a shorter trip to the last remaining Ohio company town Haydenville. During the late 1980s the Hocking acquired GP7 No. 5833 from the C&O, and in the early 1990s it was restored to its original as-delivered paint scheme. Charter trips to Canal Winchester, Ohio were also operating the early and mid-1990s over the remainder of the former C&O track now owned by the Indiana & Ohio Railway. But in 1995, the HVSR lost its original engine house as the leased land it occupied had been sold out from under them. As a result, along with new federal boiler regulations and inspection requirements, and with no facility, No. 33 was sidelined at the conclusion of the 1996 season. It was traded to Ohio Central owner Jerry Jacobson, who eventually restored it to operation. No. 33 was traded for GP10 No. 701 in 2003, and 701 works off and on with 5833, giving the old C&O workhorse a break from time to time.

== Present ==
The railroad owns and uses historic rolling stock to offer scenic rides up the Hocking River valley. It sometimes hosts specialty excursions, such as wine-tasting trips, Easter Bunny, robbery trains, and the "Santa Trains." It was named one of the world's best family train trips by the Travel Channel in 2013.

Today's locomotive fleet includes Electro-Motive Division-built GP7 No. 5833, formerly of the C&O, and GP10 Paducah-built No. 701, formerly of the Illinois Central Gulf as its No. 8307. Other diesel locomotives are rare World War II era Whitcomb 65-tonner, and former US Army Baldwin-Lima-Hamilton RS-4-TC No. 4005 and General Electric 45-tonner No. 7318. Currently one coal-burning steam locomotive, former Ohio Power Company 0-6-0 Baldwin-built No. 3, the Nelsonville shop completed a full restoration in 2015. No. 3 is currently working for the summer seasons, including pulling the line's “The Friendliest Train Robbery” service on select dates.

Passenger equipment includes commuter coaches from the Chicago & Northwestern and Chicago, Rock Island & Pacific, a day-coach from the Baltimore & Ohio, a combination baggage-passenger car also of the B&O (the oldest piece of equipment, built in 1917), and two converted flat cars used as open-air passenger cars equipped with wooden bench seats. All of the enclosed coaches are equipped with heating units (electric or coal). A former Penn Central transfer caboose is used as the on-board generator car, supplying electricity for the trains.

== Equipment ==
=== Locomotives ===
Locomotive details
Number	Image	Type	Model	Built	Builder	Status
3		Steam	0-6-0	1920	Baldwin Locomotive Works	Operational
701		Diesel	GP10	1974	Electro-Motive Division	Operational
1231		Diesel	SW1200	1950s'	Electro-Motive Division	Under repairs
4005		Diesel	RS-4-TC	1954	BLH Baldwin-Lima-Hamilton	Operational
5833		Diesel	GP7	1952	Electro-Motive Diesel, Electro-Motive Division	Operational
7318		Diesel	45-ton switcher	1945	General Electric	Out of service, awaiting repairs
8122		Diesel	65-ton switcher	1944	Geo D. Whitcomb Company	Display

=== Former units ===
Locomotives details
Number	Image	Type	Model	Built	Builder	Owner
33		Steam	2-8-0	1916	Baldwin Locomotive Works	Age of Steam Roundhouse

== Gallery ==
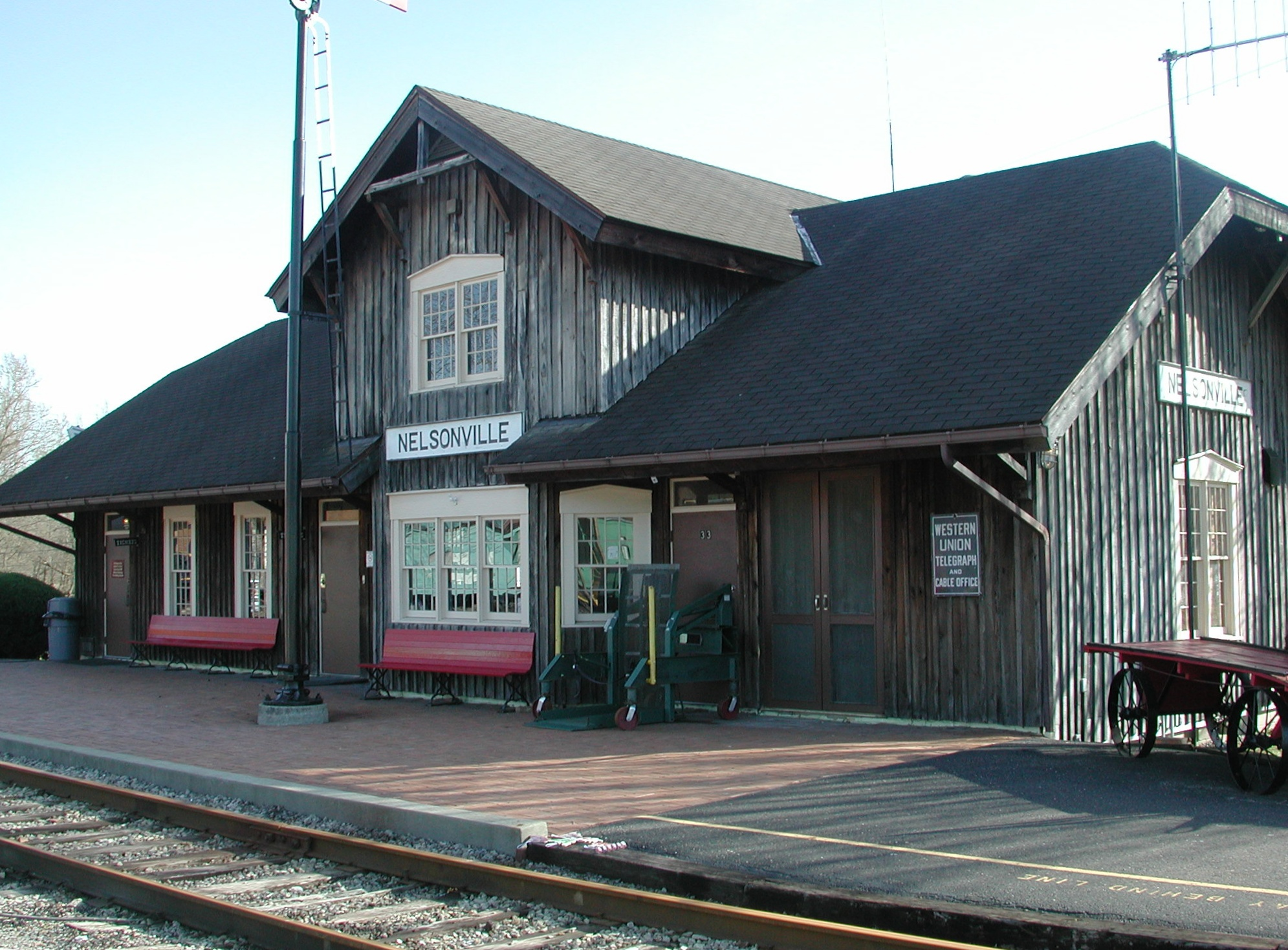

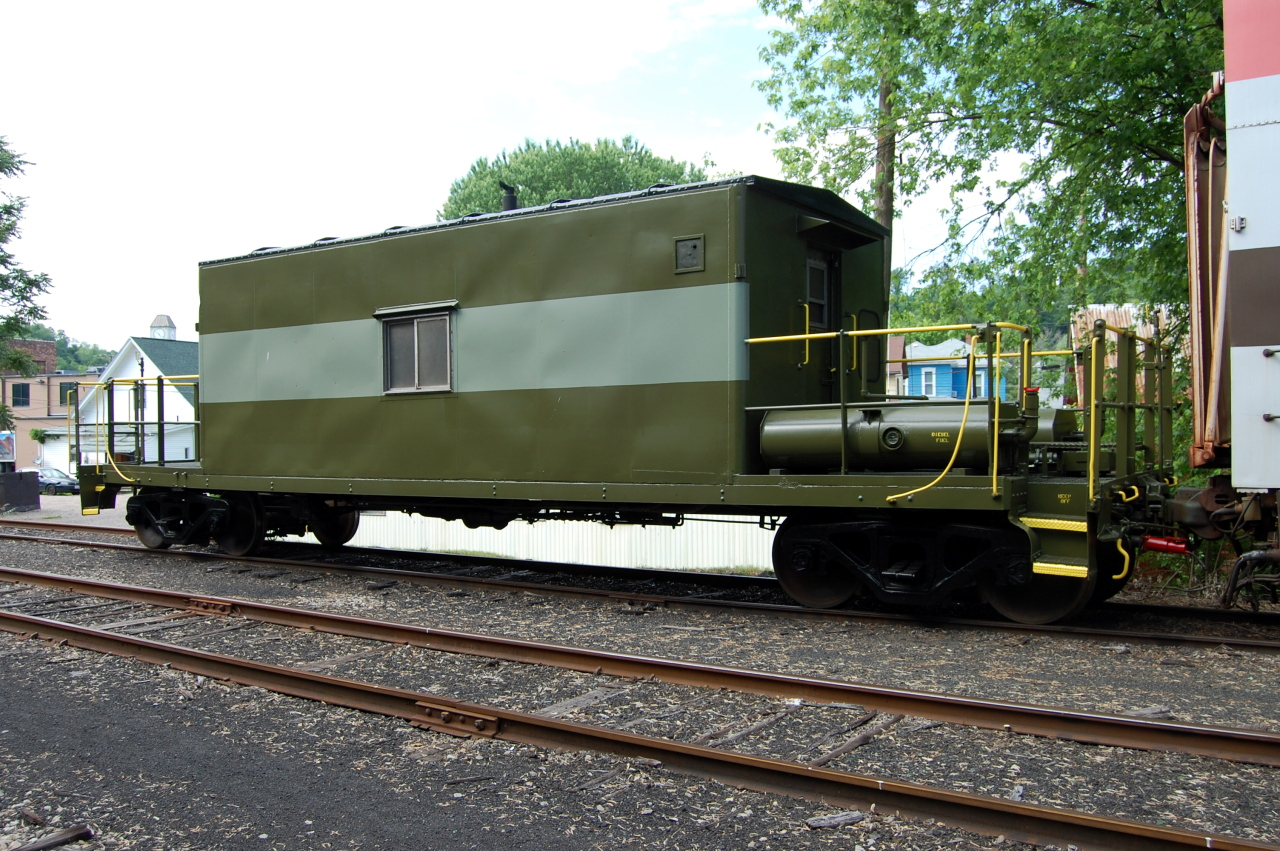

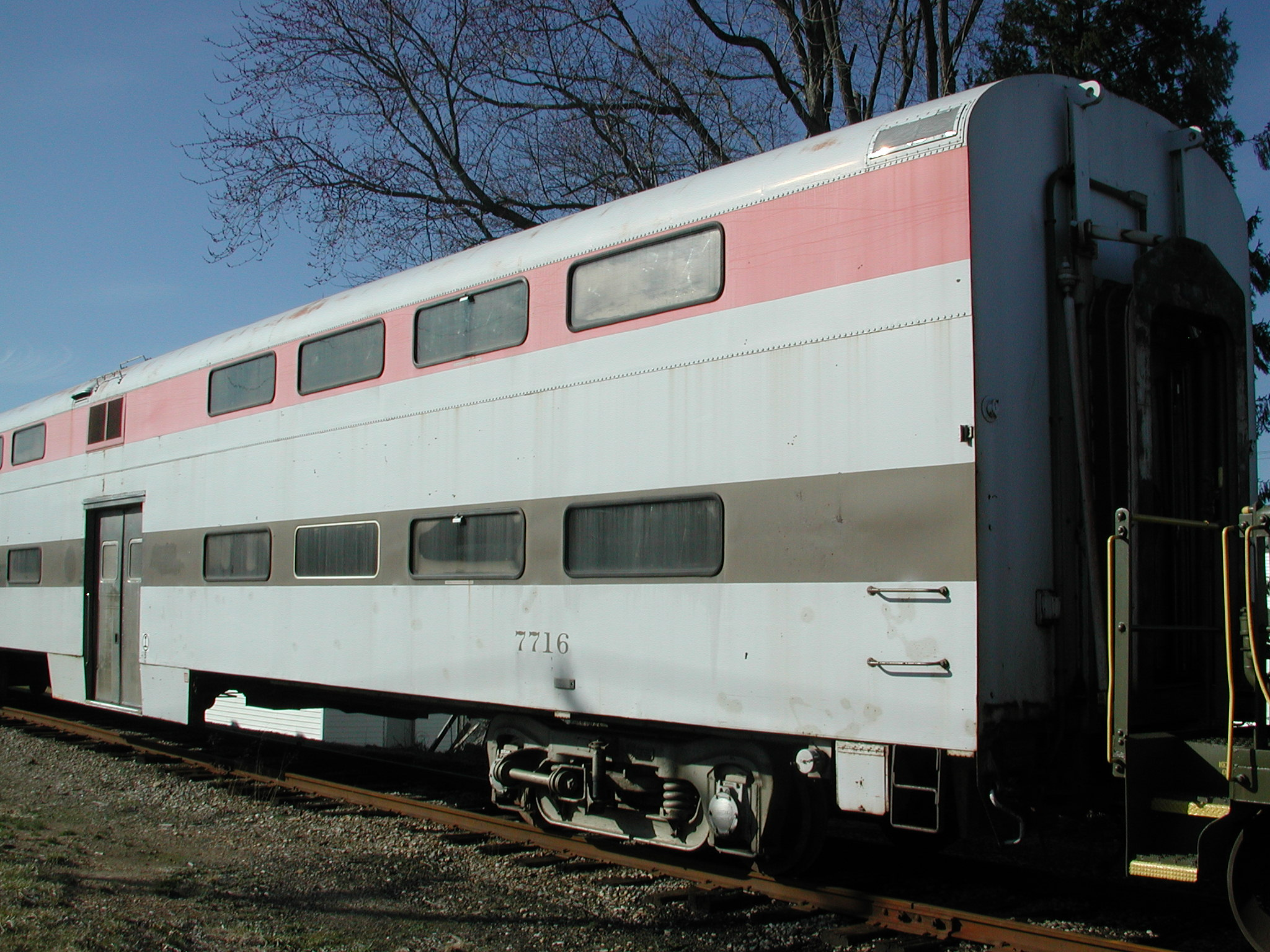

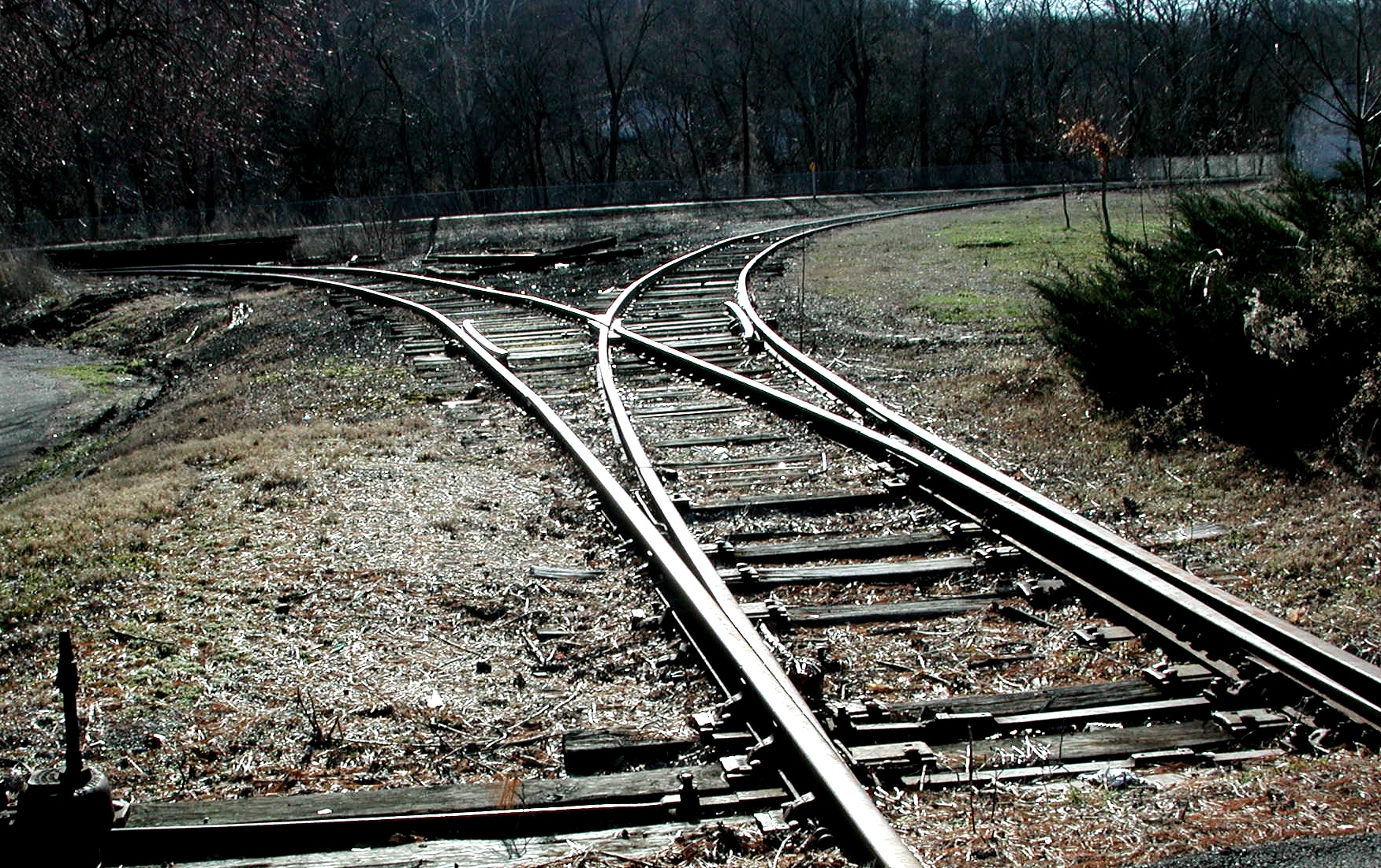

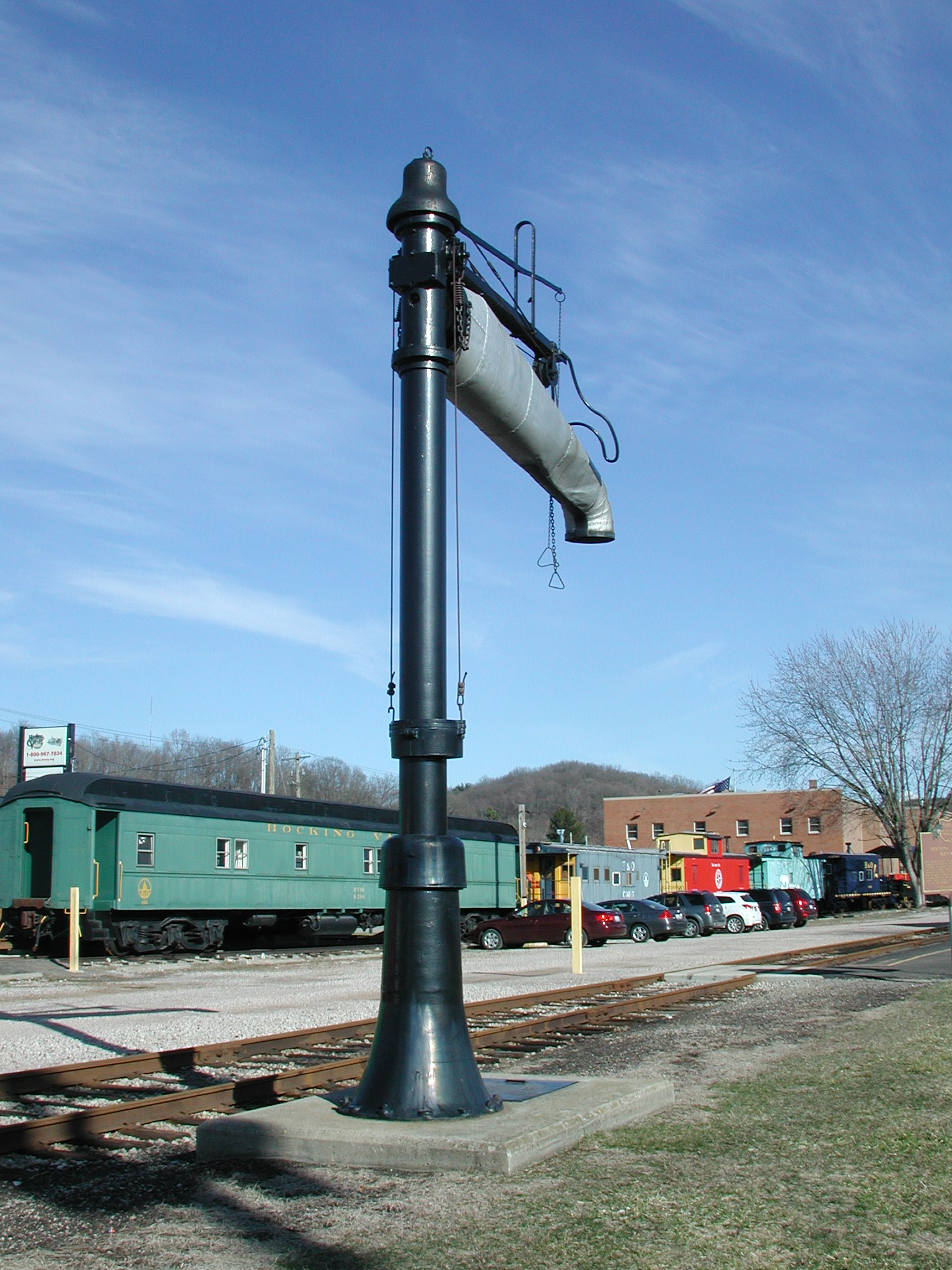

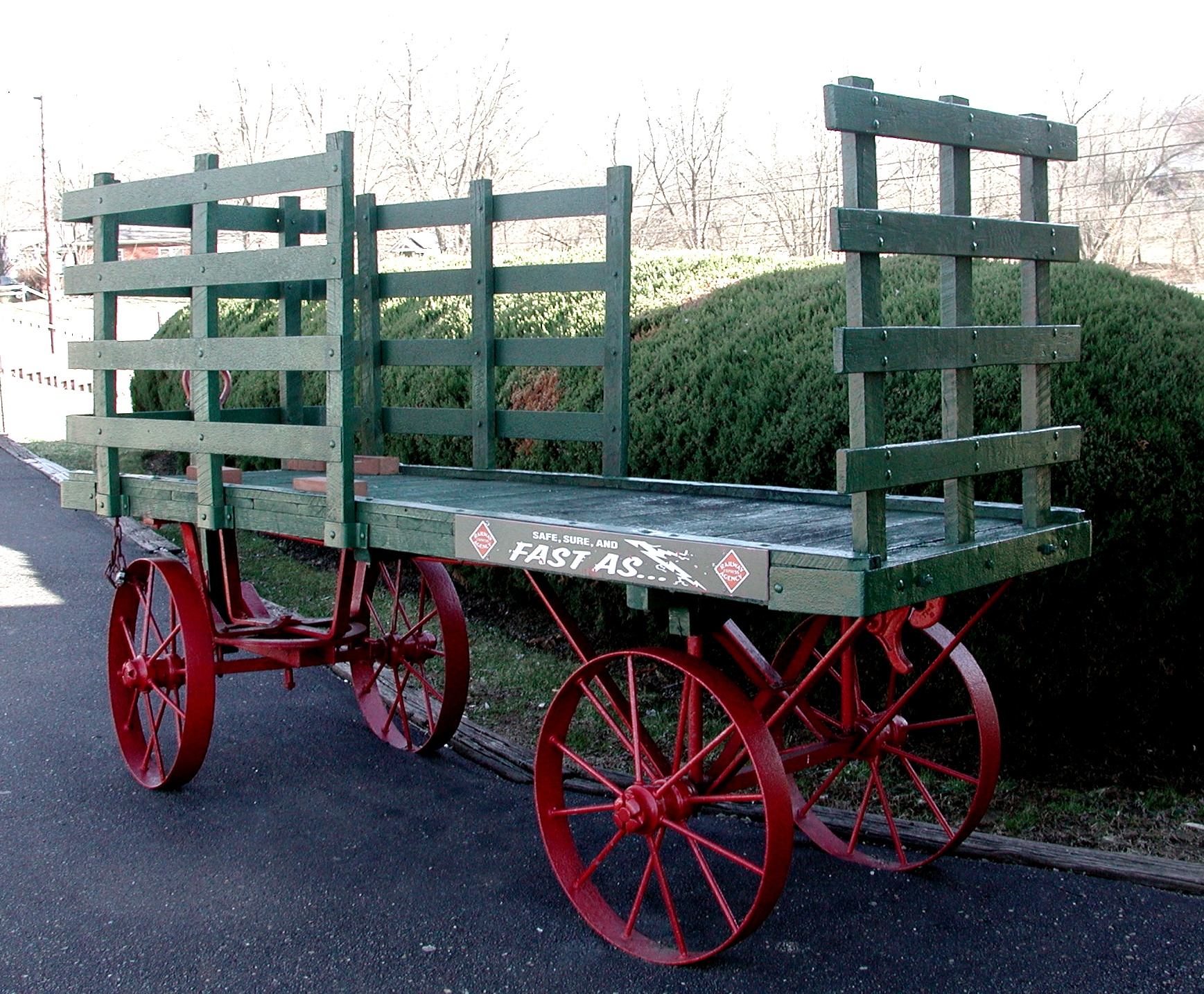
