= Ann Maria Nankabirwa =

Ugandan politician (born 1975)

- Born: 20 May 1975 (age 51)
- Citizenship: Ugandan
- Education: Uganda Polytechnic Kyambogo; Hocking College; ASM Texas University; Australian Aid
- Occupations: politician and engineer
- Employer(s): Parliament of Uganda; National Youth Council; Kibogo District Local Government; Uganda Clays Limited; Kyankwanzi District Local Government; Kigoma Farm; National Resistance Movement
- Known for: Politics
- Political party: National Resistance Movement (NRM)

Ann Maria Nankabirwa (born 20 May 1975) is a Ugandan politician and engineer. She was the district woman representative of Kyankwanzi for the 9th and 10th Parliament of Uganda.

She is affiliated to the National Resistance Movement political party. She was the aspiring Woman MP 2021–2026, for Kyankwanzi under the National Resistance Movement political party for the eleventh Parliament of Uganda, however, she lost the elections.

== Early life and education ==
Nankabirwa was born on 20 May 1975. Between 1996 and 1998, she attained an Ordinary Diploma from Uganda Polytechnic Kyambogo. In the year 1998 to 2000, she was awarded a bachelor's degree in Cheremic Enginery Technology from Hocking College. In 1999, she completed a Certificate in Computer from ASM Texas University. In 2012, she enrolled for a Certificate in Oil and Gas Management Leadership from Australian Aid. She holds a Certificate in Attractive Industries Management (2014) from CPA.

== Career ==
=== Before politics ===
In 2002–2006, eankabirwa ved as the Coordinator of Youth Leadership and Entrepreneurship Program at the National Youth Council. In the same year (2002-2006), she also worked as the Dist Female Youth Councilor. From 2002 to 2003, she was employed at Kibogo District Local Government as the Secretary for Gender and Community Development. In 1998–2002, She went back to National Youth Council and worked as the Secretary for Finance. In 2012, she served at the Parliament of Uganda as the Member Select Committee on NSSF. In 1999, she worked at Uganda Clays Limited as the Cheremic Technician. Between 2011 and 2016, she was the Chairperson DISM at Roads Committee Kyankwanzi at the District Local Government. In 2002, she began working at Kigoma Farm as the managing director. Between 2015 and 2000, she joined National Resistance Movement as the Kyankwanzi NRM District Chairperson.

=== Political career ===
From May 2011 to 2021, Nankabirwa served as the Member of Parliament at the Parliament of Uganda. She served as a member on the Natural Resources Committee. She is known for exposing corruption. During the amendment of the age-limit, some NRM leaders condemned her for spearheading the first public adoption of an NRM district resolution to lift the presidential age limit where the resolution was adopted and announced on July 4.

== Personal life ==
Nankabirwa is married. Her hobbies are sports and music. She has special interest in Women Development Clubs and Church.

== See also ==
- List of members of the tenth Parliament of Uganda
- List of members of the ninth Parliament of Uganda
- Kyankwanzi
- National Resistance Movement
- Parliament of Uganda
