= Nelsonville Cross =

- Interactive map of Nelsonville Cross
- Location: Nelsonville, Ohio
- Coordinates: 39°27′43″N 82°13′40″W
- Type: Christian Cross
- Length: 4.5 ft (1.4 m)
- Width: 25 ft (7.6 m)
- Height: 65 ft (20 m)
- Completion date: 8 April 1973
- Dedicated to: Elizabeth Anita (Smith) Schwartz

The Nelsonville Cross (also called the Elizabeth Schwartz Memorial Cross) in Nelsonville, Ohio, is the world's only large metal cross monument ever dedicated to a woman. Sixty-five feet tall, 4 1/2 ft. thick, and with arms stretching 25 ft., the illuminated cross represents a man's dedication to his lost love and his faith.

== History ==
=== Bud and Betty Schwartz ===
Walter L. “Bud” Schwartz was born on May 31, 1906, in Warren County, Ohio. Elizabeth Anita “Betty” Smith was born on April 8, 1907, in Nelsonville. On July 22, 1930, they married at Buckeye Lake, Ohio. Betty loved growing up in Nelsonville, however, she moved after graduating from Nelsonville High School to attend nursing school at Grant Hospital in Columbus, Ohio. Walter took night school classes in electronic servicing at RETS College in Centerville, Ohio. Later in life, they lived in what is now German Village of Columbus. Betty worked as the head of the cosmetics department at the downtown Lazarus store and Walter ran a drugstore with an electronic store and service shop in the back.

Betty died on January 25, 1972, near Columbus at the age of 66. Bud was heartbroken and visited Nelsonville often to help himself with the mourning process. Every Sunday, he visited the First Presbyterian Church, which Betty attended while growing up there, and drove by her childhood home on Myers Street. Bud, the church's pastor, Rev. John Lloyd Evans, and his wife decided to build a cross overlooking the city in honor of Betty and as a tribute to God.

Bud died on October 30, 1989, in Columbus. He was buried next to his wife, Betty, in Greenlawn Cemetery in Nelsonville.

=== The Cross ===
Land was secured from the Nelsonville Lumber Company. On Sunday, April 8, 1973, the cross was erected and dedicated on the highest point in the city, the Millet, also known as Kontner Hill.

A plaque at the bottom of the monument reads:

My Thanks

This “Nelsonville Cross Park,” a Memorial to my dear beloved and wonderful wife “Betty,” has become a reality because of the wisdom and untiring efforts of the Rev. John Lloyd Evans, Pastor of the First Presbyterian Church.

The land for this nondenominational inspirational park was donated by Mrs. Emily Sharp Hennessey, in memory of her father and mother, Mr. And Mrs. Edward B. Sharp, who beautified this hillside with lovely pines.

Distinguished recognition of appreciation is due: the Nelsonville Area Improvement Committee; the City of Nelsonville; the York Township; the Athens County Engineer’s Office; the Electric Company; Mr. Eugene Edwards; Mr. William M. Watkins; Mr. Harold Bean; Councilman Mr. Reginald Levering, for his time and labor in cutting down hundreds of trees, thus clearing a path for the road to this park.

My thanks to everyone, and to you who come to glory in the “Cross.”

Walter L. Schwartz Donor of the “Cross”

A smaller plaque reads:

Nelsonville Cross A Tribute to God A Memorial to Betty

The cross was designed by Columbus architect Fred Wright. It sits on a shaft that is covered with four highly polished “Rock of Ages” granite panels that rises it 8 1/2 ft. above the ground, making total height of the original monument 73 1/2 ft. It has an underground steel-reinforced 64-ton concrete base that is 16 sq. ft. and 3 ft. deep. The visible part of the monument was made of 1,555 sq. ft. of material. The cross was made with a steel girder and covered with painted aluminum. It was the world's largest cross at the time. The cost of construction was $17,500 (equivalent to over $93,300 in 2014 dollars). Bud deeded the land to the church that helped start the project as a trustee relationship with the other Christian churches in the city.

=== Beautiful Nelsonville Cross ===
The following year, Bud wrote and published a song called “Beautiful Nelsonville Cross.” Luella Shew and Virginia Watters composed the arrangement. Available at the Nelsonville TV Cable Co. office and local music stores, it cost $1 per copy at the time and proceeds went to the Nelsonville Cross fund.

=== Repairs and Improvements ===
Schwartz planned to use the fund to not only maintain the cross, but to also establish a quiet park sanctuary. By 1974, a partial roadway was constructed for visitors. Nelsonville native Emily Sharp Hennessy of Columbus donated 15,000 sq. ft. of land to enlarge the park area and allow for the construction of the access road. The Nelsonville Area Improvement Committee improved the area in 1977 by updating the road, placing sod and shrubbery around the cross, and adding a plastic-coated fence around the park.

In 1975, there were a few brush fires near the cross, but they did not cause any damage. However, in June 1981, the cross was heavily damaged by high winds. Bud used the maintenance funds, but he also had to sell his home to help with the redesigning and rebuilding costs, which came to over $30,000. The cross was replaced in October 1983 with Bud in attendance. He told Eugene “Joe” Edwards, a local reporter, that, on top of being a memorial to his late wife and a tribute to God, he felt an obligation to Nelsonville to rebuild the cross as a tourist destination.

A few years later, repeated vandalism to the three 1,000-watt mercury vapor lights made the monument only visible during the day. In 1996, the First National Bank Board of Directors and community members rewired the lights and created a pole-mounted light box to protect the new lighting from vandalism. The Brooks Shoe Company bought the property south of the cross and removed the trees blocking the city's view of the memorial.

== Today ==
The cross still stands, visible day and night, from most parts of the city, thanks to the local community.

To visit the cross, turn onto Saint Charles Street from Poplar Street and go to the very end of the road.
