= Stuart's Opera House =

Historic building in Ohio

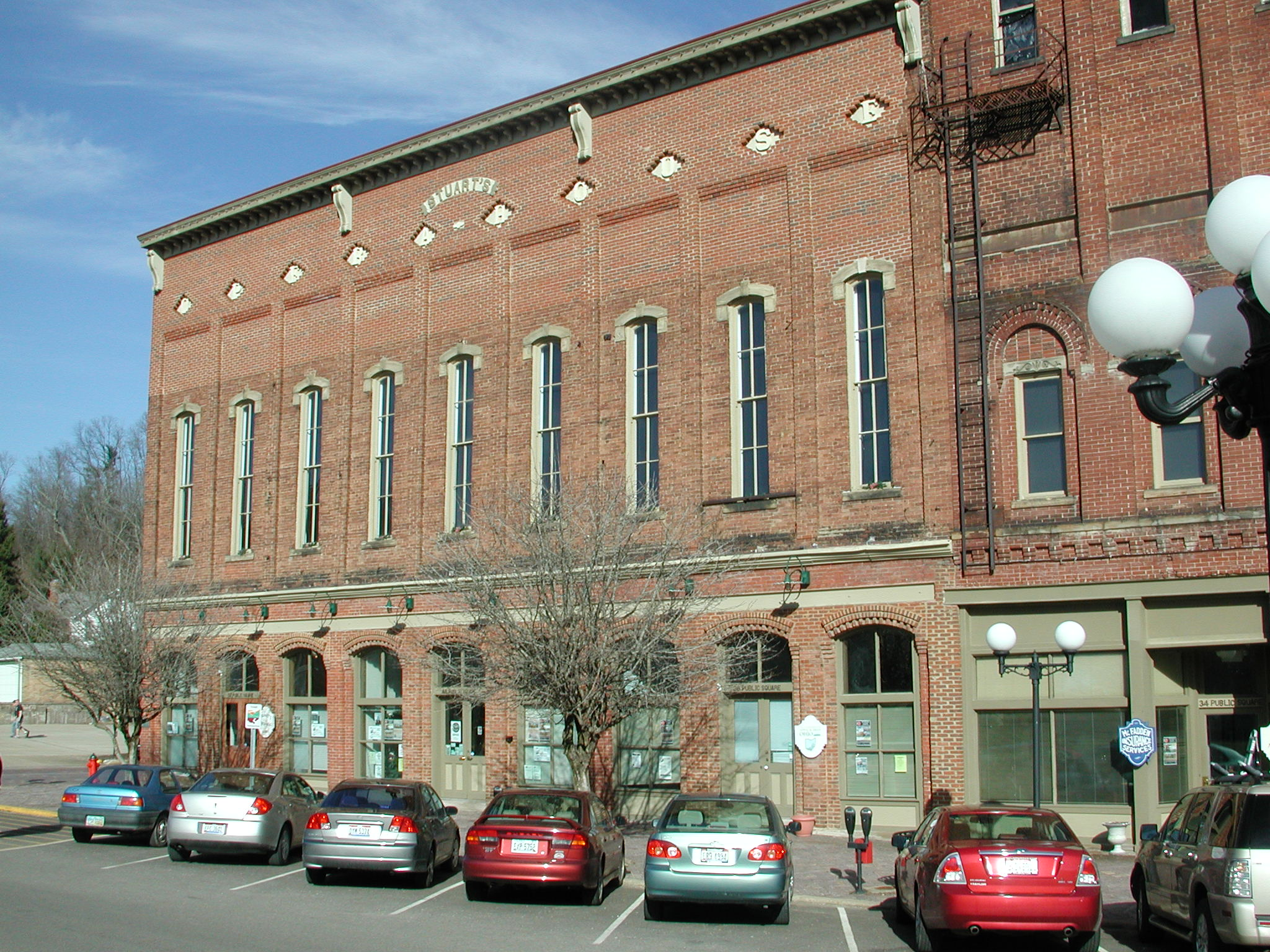
- Interactive map of Stuart's Opera House
- Address: 52 Public Square, Nelsonville, Ohio; United States
- Capacity: 395
- Type: Live event venue

Construction
- Opened: 1879

Website
- www.stuartsoperahouse.org
- Stuart's Opera House
- U.S. National Register of Historic Places
- Location within Ohio Location within the United States
- Coordinates: 39°27′39″N 82°13′55″W
- NRHP reference No.: 78002007
- Added to NRHP: 1978-12-29

Stuart's Opera House is a registered historic building in Nelsonville, Ohio, listed on the National Register on December 29, 1978. It is an Opera House and live music performance theatre that was built in 1879, and continues to be used to this day.

== History ==
=== Founding Story ===
The man who would build Stuart's Opera House, George Stuart, began life in show business as the owner and operator of a showboat, traveling through the canal system of Ohio with a professional minstrel troupe. Stuart's showboat sank in 1869 with construction of his new opera house beginning soon after.

Workers finished construction of the Opera House in 1879, at the start of Nelsonville's boom period brought about by the growing rail system which sent coal from the area to the industrialized north. The presence of an Opera House signaled that Nelsonville had thoroughly established itself. The building quickly became a cultural centerpiece of the town, not only as a place of entertainment, but as a gathering place for community events: from benefits for local organizations and high school graduations, to Sunday school classes too large to fit in the local church. The Opera House attracted a high caliber of shows as well, playing host to some of the most successful acts of the era. The Opera House would continue to be deeply connected to Nelsonville until its closure in 1924, which was brought about in part by audiences’ preference for film and the coal boom coming to a halt.

Stuart's doors would remain closed until the 1970s when the Hocking Valley Museum of Theatrical History bought the building with the goal of restoring it to a working theater, as well as a place of learning. The hopes to restore Stuart's were nearly dashed, however, when the building was enveloped in flames on March 24, 1980. In the end, it was decided that Stuart's would be restored, and after an immense amount of money and effort, Stuart's was finally ready to house an audience once more.

=== Board ===
- President: Kristi Brooks
- Vice-President: Kelly Hatas
- Treasurer: Dan Stroh
- Secretary: Mary K Walsh
- Josh Antonnuccio
- Rick Camino
- Jenny Pope
- Abby Saving
- Karl Runser
- Tyrone Carr
- Sharell Arocho-Wise
- Susan Harmony
- Susan Hadley
- Faith Knutsen
- Kristi Kinnard
- Ted Van Hyning

Board Member Emeritus

- Frederick Oremus
- Katie McCoy

== Nelsonville Music Festival ==
Stuart's Opera House produces the annual Nelsonville Music Festival as well as over 75 other events a year which include live music, theatre, films, and educational programming.

=== Stages ===
NMF features a main stage, a picturesque Porch Stage, the small No-Fi Cabin featuring artists performing with no electricity, and a FREE Boxcar Stage with music from an old train car turned into a stage backdrop and mural.

=== NMF Notable Acts ===
Past performers have included Wilco, The Flaming Lips, Willie Nelson, George Clinton & Parliament Funkadelic, Ween, Loretta Lynn, Gillian Welch, John Prine, The Avett Brothers, They Might Be Giants, The Decemberists, Randy Newman, Merle Haggard, Iron & Wine, Yo La Tengo, George Jones, Emmylou Harris, Courtney Barnett, MJ Lenderman, Big Thief, and many more.
