= James B. Preston =

American neurophysiologist, (1926–2004)

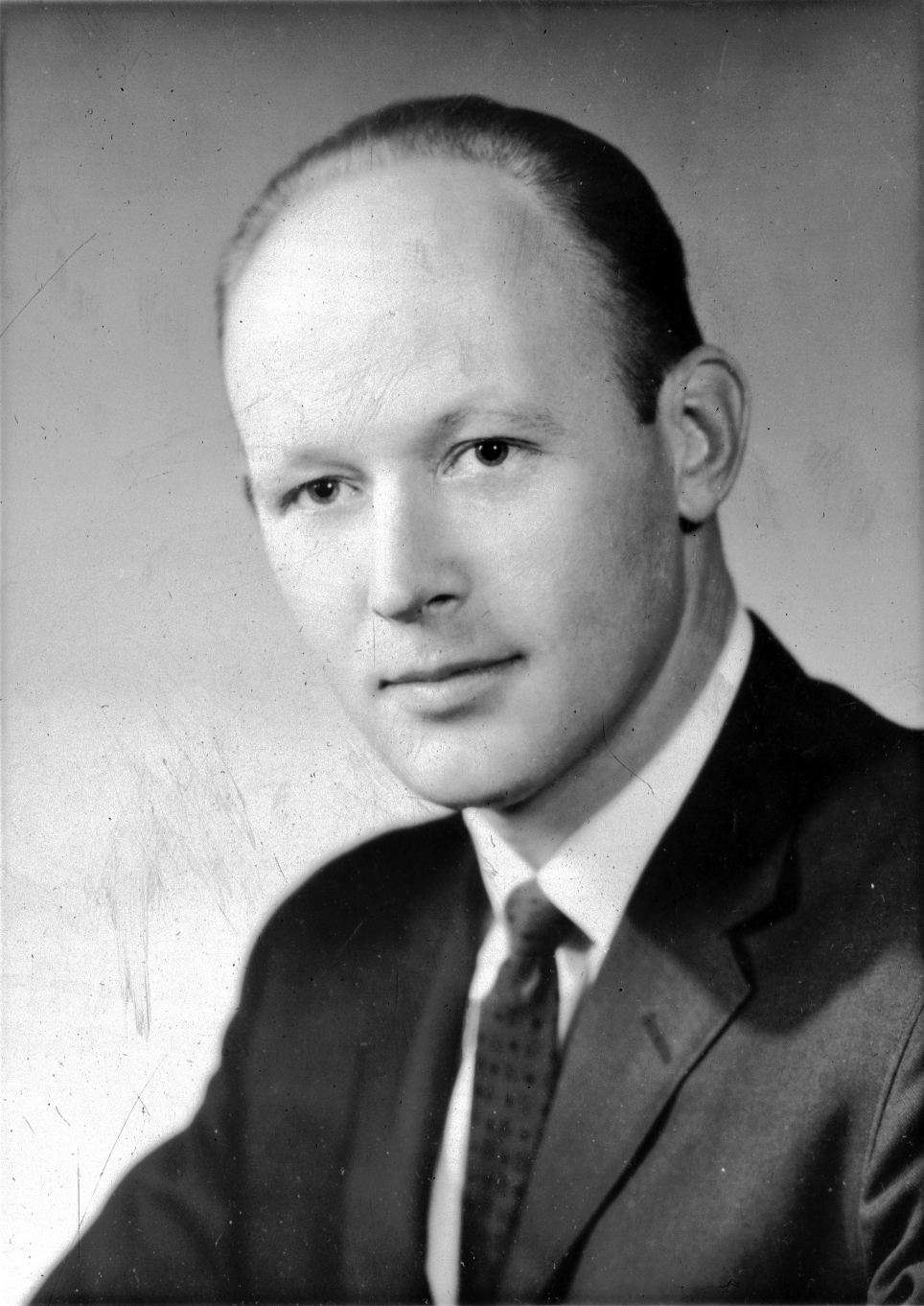
- James B. Preston
- Born: February 4, 1926; Nelsonville, Ohio, U.S.
- Died: 6 June 2004 (aged 78); Syracuse, New York, U.S.
- Occupations: Neurophysiologist. Chairman and Professor. Department of Physiology. SUNY Upstate Medical University
- Spouse: Barbara Preston (1925-2008). Married for 53 years.
- Children: Anne Asher; Jeanne Mitchell; Jim Preston

Academic background
- Education: University of Cincinnati

Notes
- hsl.upstate.edu/historical/finding_aids/preston_james.xml

James B. Preston (February 4, 1926 – June 6, 2004) was an American neurophysiologist at State University of New York Upstate Medical University whose research was fundamental to discovering how our brains control movement. Over the course of his career, he published over forty research based articles in his field. Preston was the chairman of numerous national committees and former President of the Association of Chairs of Departments of Physiology.

== Early life and education ==
Dr. Preston was born in Nelsonville, Ohio on February 4, 1926. His father, Benson Preston, was the Nelsonville Postmaster and his mother, Ruth Preston, was the public health nurse for the Nelsonville area. In 1944 he graduated from Nelsonville High School and went on to attend Ohio Wesleyan University from 1944-1945. His education was interrupted by military service. He served in Korea from 1945-1947 as a member of the Army Signal Corps and as a medic stationed on the 38th parallel. When he returned, he attended Ohio Wesleyan for another year and then enrolled at the University of Cincinnati College of Medicine where he received his MD in 1952. He spent the next two years in a combined internship-research fellowship at the University of Illinois College of Medicine.

== Career ==
In 1954 Dr. Preston was hired as an instructor at the SUNY Upstate Medical University, and in 1956 he was named an assistant professor at Upstate. In 1960 at the age of 34, he was promoted to a full professor and chairman of the Department of Physiology where he remained for 31 years before he retired in 1991. In 1992 he became a professor emeritus at the SUNY Upstate Medical University. Preston’s scientific research centered on investigations into the neural basis of the control of movement. During his career, he published over forty research based articles in his field. His research was continuously funded by the National Institute of Health for over thirty-two years. Many of his graduate students and postdoctoral students went on to distinguished academic careers in the area of neural science. For over forty years, medical students benefited from his instruction. His papers are located in the Upstate Medical University Health Sciences Library’s Archives and Special Collections. A book containing his publications can be found in the University of Cincinnati College of Medicine’s Donald C. Harrison Library. Books containing his publications can be found in the University of Cincinnati College of Medicine's Donald C. Harrison Library and at the Ohio Wesleyan University's Beeghly Library.

== Selected National and State Committees ==
Preston served on numerous national and state committees including: Chairman, Physical and Molecular Biology Evaluation Conference-NIH, DRG (1968); Chairman, Physiology Training Committee-NIGMS, NIH (1971-1973); Chairman, Working Group on Pharmacology, National Advisory Committee on Multiple Sclerosis-USPHS (1973-1974); President, Association of Chairs of Departments of Physiology (1973-1974); Chairman, Subcommittee on Chemotherapeutic Agents, National Multiple Sclerosis Society (1975-1980); Chairman, Sponsored Research Advisory Committee, Research Foundation, SUNY (1982-1986); Conference Chair, Winter Conference on Brain Research (1987-1988); Director, Winter Conference on Brain Research (1989-1991).

== Selected publications ==
- Preston, J.B. and E.F. Van Maanen. Effects of frequency of stimulation on the paralyzing dose of neuromuscular blocking agents. J. Pharmacol. and Exper. Therap. 107: 165-171, 1953.
- Preston, J.B. Pentylenetetrazole and thiosemicarbazide: A study of convulsant activity in the isolated cerebral cortex preparation. J. Pharmacol. and Exper. Therap. 115: 28-38, 1955.
- Preston, J.B. The influence of thiosemicarbazide on electrical activity recorded in the anterior brainstem of the cat. J. Pharmacol. and Exper. Therap. 115: 39-45, 1955.
- Moe, Gordon K., Preston, James B., and Burlington, Harold. Physiological structure of the A-V transmission system. Circulation Research 4: 375, 1956.
- Preston, J.B. Effects of chlorpromazine on the central nervous system of the cat. J. Pharmacol. and Exper. Therap. 118: 100-115, 1956.
- Preston, J.B. Influence of pentobarbital on ventral root reflex discharges and on intracellular potentials recorded from single motoneurons. Fed. Proc., 16: 328, 1957.
- Preston, J.B., McFadden, S., and Moe, G. Atrioventricular transmission in young mammals. Am. J. Physiol. 197: 236-240, July, 1959.
- Kennedy, D. and Preston, J.B. Activity patterns of interneurons in the caudal ganglion of the crayfish. J. Gen. Physiol. 43: 655-670, 1960.
- Preston, J.B. and Kennedy, D. Integrative synaptic mechanisms in the caudal ganglion of the crayfish. J. Gen. Physiol. 43: 671-681, 1960.
- Preston, J.B. and Whitlock, D.G. Precentral Facilitation and Inhibition of spinal motoneurons. J. Neurophysiol. 23: 154-170, 1960.
- Preston, J.B. and Whitlock, D.G. Intracellular potentials recorded from motoneurons following precentral gyrus stimulations in primates. J Neurophysiol. 24: 91-100, 1961.
- Preston, J.B. and Kennedy, D. Spontaneous activity in crustacean neurons. J. Gen Physiol. 45: 821-836, 1962.
- Kennedy, D. and Preston, J.B. Post-activation changes in excitability and spontaneous firing of crustacean interneurons. Comp. Biochem. Physiol. 8: 173-179, 1963.
- Preston, J.B. and Whitlock, D.G. A comparison of motor cortex effects on slow and fast muscle innervations in the monkey. Experimental Neurology 7: 327-341, 1963.
- Tuttle, R.S. and Preston, J.B. The effects of diphenylhydantoin (Dilantin) on segmental and suprasegmental facilitation and inhibition of segmental motoneurons in the cat. J. Pharm. Exper. Therap. 141: 84-91, 1963.
- Agnew, R.F., Preston, J.B., and Whitlock, D.G. Patterns of motor cortex effects on ankle flexor and extensor motoneurons in the “pyramidal” cat preparation. Exp. Neurol. 8: 248-263, 1963.
- Agnew, R.F. and Preston, J.B. Motor cortex-pyramidal effects on single ankle flexor and extensor motoneurons of the cat. Exp. Neurol. 12: 384-398, 1965.
- Uemura, K. and Preston, J.B. Comparison of motor cortex influences upon various hindlimb motoneurons in pyramidal cats and primates. J. Neurophysiol. 28: 398-412, 1965.
- Yanowitz, F., Preston, J.B., and Abildskov, J.A. Functional distribution of right and left stellate innervation to the ventricles: Production of neurogenic electrocardiographic changes by unilateral alteration of sympathetic tone. Circ. Res. 18: 416-428, 1966.
- Preston, J.B., Shende, M.C. and Uemura, K. The Motor Cortex-pyramidal System: Patterns of Facilitation and Inhibition on Motoneurons Innervating Limb Musculature of Cat and Baboon and Their Possible Adaptive Significance. In: Neurophysiological Basis of Normal and Abnormal Motor Activity. Ed. Yahr and Purpura, Raven Press, 1967, pp. 61–74.
- Stewart, D.H., and Preston, J.B. Functional coupling between the pyramidal tract and segmental motoneurons in cat and primate. J. Neurophysiol. 30: 453-465, 1967.
- Stewart, D.H., Preston, J.B., and Whitlock, D.G. Spinal pathways mediating motor cortex evoked excitability changes in segmental motoneurons in pyramidal cats. J. Neurophysiol. 31: 928-937, 1968.
- Stewart, D.H. and Preston, J.B. Spinal pathways mediating motor cortex evoked excitability changes in segmental motoneurons in pyramidal primate. J. Neurophysiol. 31: 937-946, 1968.
- Fidone, S.J. and Preston, J.B. Patterns of motor cortex control of flexor and extensor cat fusimotor neurons. J. Neurophysiol. 32: 103-115, 1969.
- Fidone, S.J. and Preston, J.B. Inhibitory resetting of the resting discharge of fusimotor neurons. J. Neurophysiol. 34: 217-277, 1971.
- Grigg, P. and Preston, J.B. Baboon flexor and extensor fusimotor neurons and their modulation by the motor cortex. J. Neurophysiol. 34: 428-436, 1971.
- Durkovic, R.G., Piwonka, R.W. and Preston, J.B. Cortical modulation of spindle afferent discharge patterns in the pyramidal cat. Brain Res. 40: 179-186, 1972.
- Durkovic, R.G. and Preston, J.B. Evidence of dynamic fusimotor excitation of secondary muscle spindle afferents in soleus muscle of cat. Brain Res. 75: 320-323, 1974.
- Cheney, P.D. and Preston, J.B. Classification and response characteristics of muscle spindle afferents in the primate. J. Neurophysiol. 39: 1-8, 1976.
- Cheney, P.D. and Preston, J.B. Classification of fusimotor fibers in the primate. J. Neurophysiol. 39: 9-19, 1976.
- Cheney, P.D. and Preston, J.B. Effects of fusimotor stimulation on dynamic and position sensitivities of spindle afferents in the primate. J. Neurophysiol. 39: 20-30, 1976.
- Hore, J., Preston, J.B., Durkovic, R.G. and Cheney, P.D. Responses of cortical neurons (areas 3a and 4) to ramp stretch of hindlimb muscles in the baboon. J. Neurophysiol. 39: 484-500, 1976.
- Sakai, S. and Preston, J.B. Evidence for a transcortical reflex: Primate corticospinal tract neuron responses to ramp stretch of muscle. Brain Res. 159: 463-467, 1978.
- Strick, P.L. and Preston, J.B. Multiple motor representation in the primate motor cortex. Brain Res. 154: 366-370, 1978.
- Strick P. L. and Preston, J.B. Sorting of somatosensory afferent information in primate motor cortex. Brain Res. 156: 364-368, 1978.
- Strick, P.L. and Preston, J.B. Multiple representation in the motor cortex: A new concept of input-output organization for the forearm representation. In: Integration in the Nervous System. Ed., Asanuma, H. and Wilson, V.J. Igaku-Shoin Ltd., Tokyo, 1978, pp. 205–221.
- Strick, P.L. and Preston, J.B. Two representations of the hand in area 4 of a primate. I. Motor Output Organization. J. Neurophysiol. 48: 139-149, 1982.
- Strick, P.L. and Preston, J.B. Two representations of the hand in area 4 of a primate. II. Somatosensory Input Organization. J. Neurophysiol. 48: 150-159, 1982.
- Strick, P.L. and Preston, J.B. Input-output organization of the primate motor cortex. In: Motor Control in Health and Disease. Ed., Desmedt, J.E. Raven Press, NY, 1983.
- Holsapple, J.W., Preston, J.B., and Strick, P.L. The origin of thalamic inputs to the “hand” representation in the primary motor cortex. Journal of Neuroscience 11: 2644-2654, 1991.
