= Sarah White =

American singer-songwriter

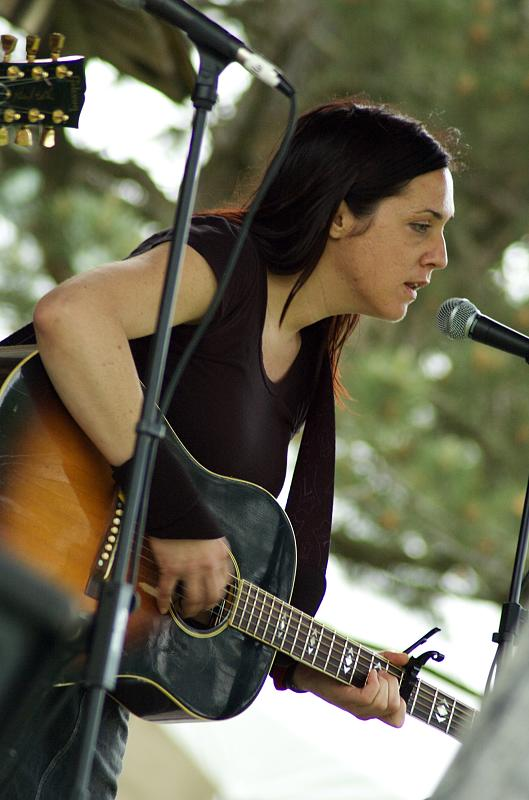
- Nelsonville Music Festival May 17, 2008

Background information
- Born: Warrenton, Virginia, U.S.
- Genres: Folk, alt-country
- Occupations: Singer-songwriter, musician
- Instruments: Guitar, vocals
- Years active: 1996–present
- Label: Jagjaguwar
- Member of: Sarah White & the Pearls
- Website: sarahwhitesongs.com

Sarah White is a singer-songwriter based in Richmond, Virginia, whose music can be roughly characterized as folk or alt-country.

== Biography ==
Sarah White was born in Warrenton, Virginia, and grew up in Sinks Grove, West Virginia. When she returned to Virginia she became involved with the growing music community in Charlottesville — a town where she "grew up" and lived in "off and on for years." There she played in several bands towards the end of the 90's (White Trash Cookin', Pat Nixon, Miracle Penny).

Record label Jagjaguwar, originally based out of Charlottesville before moving to Indiana to merge with Secretly Canadian, released her first solo album in 1997 – a collection of lo-fi four-track recordings made over a 3-year period – dubbed All My Skies Are Blue.

In 2000, she released her second album, entitled Bluebird, also on Jagjaguwar. The record garnered her a wide range of positive reviews and comparisons to artists like Cat Power and Edith Frost. Later that year she recorded and self-released Pickin' Strummin' And Singin' ... The Versatile Sarah White which was a collection of early country standards and traditional songs.

After remaining fairly quiet for the next several years, White returned with a new band, Sarah White & the Pearls, in 2004 with the self-released You're It EP which focused even further on melodic writing and incorporated the more traditional folk and country song structures. In 2006 she completed her next full-length album with The Pearls, White Light, which was released by Antenna Farm Records. The Richmond Times-Dispatch called her third full-length album "an unassailable collection of absolutely unforgettable songs, the product of White's talent and tenacity."

Of the title track, White says:

. . 'White Light' is a love-lost song, and a laundry list of distractions to stave off emptiness: television, noise, going out, staying busy, never stopping. Of course, these things never really work.

White released her first full-length album in over 10 years on August 3, 2018. High Flyer Recorded at Montrose Studio in Richmond, Virginia, features a dozen of White's "best songs" backed by Daniel Clarke (K.d. lang, Ryan Adams) on piano and keyboard, and Charles Arthur (Slaid Cleaves) on guitars – with vocals by Carl Anderson and Michael York of Sleepwalkers. Dave Matthews sings with White on "Sweetheart". Stewart Myers, who produced the album, also provided bass.

White also performs with Sían Richards in the Acorn Sisters.

== Awards and distinctions ==
Sarah White's song Sweetheart won best song in Mountain Stage's annual Newsong Festival in 2007.

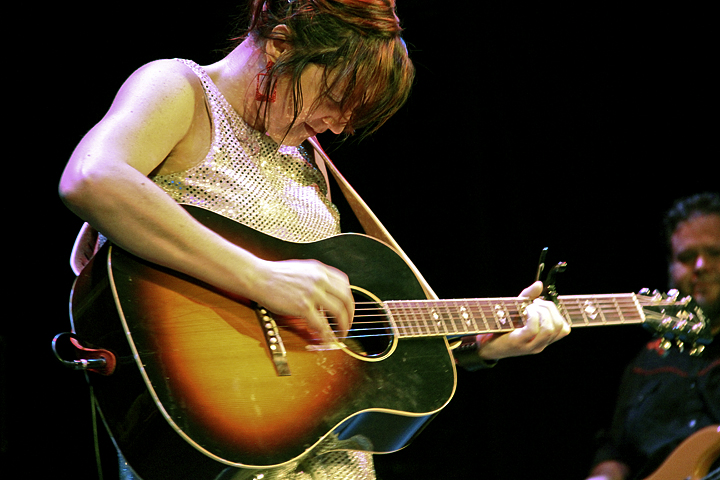
Jefferson Theater in Charlottesville, Virginia August 21, 2010

== Discography ==
- All My Skies Are Blue (Jagjaguwar, 1997)
- Bluebird (Jagjaguwar, 2000)
- You're It (2004)
- White Light (2006)
- High Flyer (2018)

=== Compilations ===
- Folk Music for the End of the World (2006)
- Even Cowgirls Get the Blues (2007)
