= Betty Young =

American educator

Academic background
- Education: Ohio University

Betty Young is an American college administrator who has served as the president of Hocking College, a community college in Nelsonville, Ohio, since 2015. Young has served as president of two other community colleges, Northwest State Community College and Asheville-Buncombe Technical Community College.

== Education ==
Young graduated from Ohio University in Athens with an associate degree in math and science, a bachelor's degree in business administration, a master's degree in education, and a doctorate in higher education. A graduate of Capital University Law School in Columbus, Young is licensed to practice law in Ohio and West Virginia.

== Career ==
=== Washington State Community College ===
Young began her career in higher education as a faculty member and department chair at Washington State Community College.

=== Franklin University ===
Young served as an academic administrator at Franklin University beginning in 1999.

=== Northwest State Community College ===
Young was president of Northwest State Community College in Archbold, Ohio from 2003 until 2007.

In September 2005, Young responded to a joke by late-night talk show host Jay Leno calling a sex industry education seminar "less embarrassing than going to a junior college" by staging a publicity tour called "The Lessons for Leno National Tour." Young made a trip from Ohio to California almost entirely on her Harley-Davidson motorcycle, had a brief meeting with Leno, then staged a press conference defending two-year universities.

=== Asheville-Buncombe Technical Community College ===
Young was named president of Asheville-Buncombe Technical Community College in Asheville, North Carolina, on September 1, 2007. She resigned in Spring 2009.

=== Houston Community College ===
Young was appointed president of Coleman College for Health Sciences, a part of the Houston Community College, starting April 1, 2009. Chancellor Cesar Maldonado fired Young in 2014.

=== Hocking College ===
Young was named interim president of Hocking College in October 2014 and was given the permanent position in April 2015.

In February 2016, Young received a vote of no confidence from 92.93% of the college's faculty and staff. Criticisms laid out in a letter to the chairman of the Board of Trustees included overcrowded classes, an overuse of adjunct professors, inexperienced instructors, a lack of transparency in her leadership, and a disregard for staff and faculty input leading to a "continuous decline in morale among staff, faculty, students, alumni and the community."

Preceded by Dr. Larry McDougle	President, Northwest State Community College; 2003-2007	Succeeded by Dr. Thomas Stuckey
