= Mucca Pazza =

US musical group

- Origin: Chicago, Illinois, United States
- Genres: Circus; Punk; Marching band
- Years active: 2004–present
- Members: Freaks:Hope Arthur (Accordion), Charlie Malave (Guitar/Mandolin), Rachel Mossburg (Violin), Molly Rife (cello) Woodwinds: Airan Wright, Dave Smith, Luc Mosely, Angela Wong Trumpets: Sam Johnson, Jim McBride, Anna Jacobson, Peter Gillette Bones:Chris Dixon, Jessica Sigur, Dominic Gaietto Sousaphone/Tuba: Mike Hogg, Akshat Jain, Carrie Sullivan Percussion "K12": Larry Beers, John Carroll, Andy Deitrich, Hershyl Edwards, Rick Kubes, Amanda Legner, Brent Roman Cheerleaders: Sharon Lanza, Vanessa Valliere, Rawson Vint, Lily Emerson
- Past members: Nick Siegel (trpt), Jim Langenberg (Sousa), Justin Amolsch (trpt), Susie Inverso (trpt), Maria Hernandez (sax), Garrick Smith (sax), Nora Barton (cello), Myra Hinrichs (Violin), Sara Morgan (K12), Amanda Bailey (violin), Elanor Leskiw (trombone), Nick Broste (trombone), Ronnie Kuller (accordion), Gary Kalar (mandolin), Donnell Williams (cheer), Shaye Cohn (accordion), Ben Cole (trumpet), Dave Ramey (trombone), Lori Myers (cheer), Dan Dorff (percussion), Loto Ball (trumpet), Max Crawford (trumpet), Sara Bowden (trombone), Winston Damon (trombone), Nick Dempsey (saxophone), Michael Hartman (cymbals), Jeremy Jacobsen (accordion), Ernst Karel (trumpet), Eve Monzingo (woodwind), Vanessa Stalling (cheer), Dan Stark (trombone), Noah Tabakin (saxophone), Greg Nicolett (trombone), Jay St. Germain (tenor saxophone), Jon Steinmeier (percussion), George Lawler (percussion), Ronnie Malley (percussion), Timothy Heck (cheer), Lindsey Whiting (cheer), Paul Brannon (percussion), Jessica Hudson (cheer), Greg Hirte (violin), Jeff Thomas (guitar), Mark Messing (sousaphone), Tony DiMartino (snare), Dave Levine (saxophone), Ellis Seiberling (trombone), Kelsee Vandervall (Cello), Tom Howe (Trombone), Neil Brown (Trombone), Katy Collins (Cheer), Susan Bratton (Trombone).
- Website: www.muccapazza.org

Mucca Pazza is an interdisciplinary instrumental music and performance ensemble based in Chicago, USA.

Mucca Pazza consists of approximately thirty active members and performs instrumental music; their mode of performance is informed by physical theater. Mucca Pazza's instrumentation is loosely based on that of a traditional American marching band—drumline, sousaphone, trombones, trumpets, saxophones—but also includes electric guitar, mandolin, violin, cello, accordion, and cheerleaders. Their sound references American marching band and big band traditions, as well as Middle Eastern music, California surf, Ennio Morricone, and 1950s television show themes. They perform in mismatched marching band uniforms, and are known for their energetic performances.

Their debut album, A Little Marching Band, was released in 2006. Their second full-length album, Plays Well Together, was released in June 2008. The band's song "Borino Oro" was featured in a season 4 episode of the Showtime television show Weeds, and the songs "Tube Sock Tango" and "St. Fresca's Regret" were used in season 1, episode 8 of Amazon'sTransparent. Their third album, Safety Fifth, was released in July 2012 and a fourth full-length album, L.Y.A., was released in October 2014. Their most recent studio effort, GET PUMPED!, was released in May 2023.

== History ==
Mucca Pazza was formed in Chicago in 2004. Many of the founding members met while performing with Redmoon Theater. Early on, rehearsals took place in the parking lot of a steel mill. The first official Mucca Pazza gig was at trombone player Tom Howe's wedding at Bond Chapel at the University of Chicago.

== Collaborations ==
With the Chicago Sinfonietta

In September 2014, Mucca Pazza performed as part of the Chicago Sinfonietta's opening concert of the season. Together, the Sinfonietta and Mucca Pazza performed two pieces by Mucca Pazza composers, in orchestral arrangements by Joe Clark: "Rabbits and Trees", by David Smith; and "Holiday on Ice", by Mark Messing. The two ensembles also collaborated in performing the 1812 Overture by Pyotr Ilyich Tchaikovsky, in a conceit which featured Mucca Pazza as the invading French army and the full symphony orchestra as Russia.

In May 2018, Mucca Pazza reprised their collaboration with Chicago Sinfonietta in a concert titled Praise and Punk. There were two performances, one at Symphony Center in downtown Chicago, and one at Wentz Hall in Naperville, Illinois. In addition to performing the "ending of all endings", a medley of famous classical music endings, Mucca Pazza performed the original composition "War of Amusements" by composer and drummer Andy Dietrich and arranged by Ronnie Kuller.

With the Chicago Children's Choir

In May 2014, Mucca Pazza performed together with the 3500 children of the Chicago Children's Choir at the CCC's annual "Paint the Town Red" concert at Pritzker Pavilion in Millennium Park.

With dance company Pilobolus

In July 2019, Mucca Pazza collaborated with dance company Pilobolus on the opening ceremony of Old Forester's Kentucky Center in Louisville, Kentucky. The band was featured in some of the dance company's shadow work and provided a transition between acts.

== Tiny Desk concert ==
In January 2015, Mucca Pazza performed on NPR Music's Tiny Desk concert series, with either 23 or 24 band members present. Bob Boilen, creator of the series, described the band's performance as "the biggest and most colorful Tiny Desk show of them all, this one was a challenge and a thrill to pull off". Mucca Pazza's appearance was later selected by Bob Boilen as one of the 15 best Tiny Desk concerts of 2015.

== Music videos ==
Mucca Pazza has created music videos for the songs "Boss Taurus", "All Out of Bubblegum (live at Mass MoCA)", "Tube Sock Tango (wax cylinder version)", "The Sit Down Waltz", "Rest on Muffin Street", and "Mr. Spider Goes Home to Spiderland".

Mucca Pazza is featured in the official music video for Andrew Bird's song "Fitz and the Dizzyspells", which was filmed at The Hideout in Chicago in 2009. The video storyline was written by Sharon Lanza.

== Discography ==
- A Little Marching Band (2007)
- Plays Well Together (2008)
- Safety Fifth (2012)
- L.Y.A. (2014)
- Barbarous Relic, single (2017)
- Trick or Treat, EP (2017)
- War of Amusements, single (2018)
- GET PUMPED! (2023)

In 2019, Mucca Pazza opened for "Weird Al" Yankovic at Ravinia.

In 2020, Mucca Pazza was chosen for Newcity's Music 45—outstanding artists of Chicago's 2020 music community.
