= Hocking College =

Community college in Nelsonville, Ohio, US

Coordinates: 38.21980°N 85.70300°W

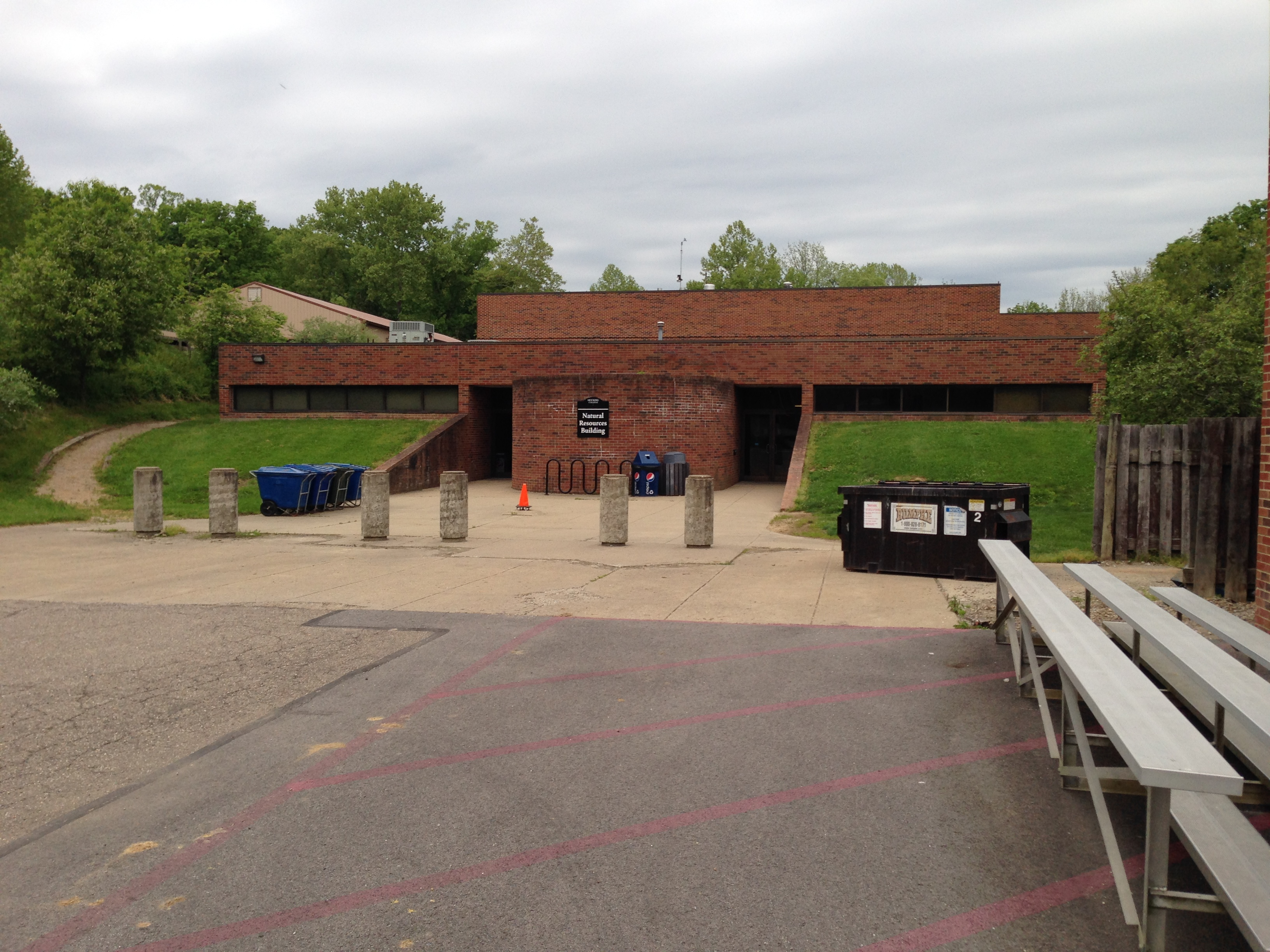
- Type: Public community college
- Established: 1968; 58 years ago
- Parent institution: University System of Ohio
- Endowment: $4.8 million (2013)
- President: Betty Young
- Students: 3,345 (fall 2023)
- Location: Nelsonville, Ohio, United States
- Campus: Rural; 2,300 acres (9.3 km^{2}); 20 buildings
- Colors: Gold, Green, Blue
- Nickname: Hawks
- Sporting affiliations: NJCAA; OCCAC
- Website: www.hocking.edu

Hocking College is a public community college in Nelsonville, Ohio, United States. The college offers more than 60 associate and vocational programs and is accredited by the Higher Learning Commission. The college was chartered in 1969 by the Ohio Board of Regents.

Hocking had 3,474 students enrolled (78% of students are full-time) in fall 2023. Its 2,300-acre campus is set in a rural setting and uses a semester-based academic calendar. Hocking's athletic teams are the Hawks and they play in the National Junior College Athletics Association.

== History ==
Hocking College came into existence as the Tri-County Institute. In the 1960s, the need for a vocational school and technical college became apparent in Southeast Ohio through demographic studies and population surveys. The Tri-County Institute was built on the campus of the Tri-County Joint Vocational School with the schools sharing laboratory and service areas. Fall 1968 marked the opening of the institute with approximately 250 students and 28 instructors. In 1969, the Ohio Board of Regents granted a charter to the institute, and they were authorized to grant degrees in 13 technical programs. The first commencement took place in June 1970 with 117 graduates.

In 1972, the official name of the school was changed to Hocking Technical College and 250 acres were purchased for new building and future development. In 1975, the college relocated its main campus to its current site on Hocking Parkway. The same year, residence halls opened on Hocking's campus, making it the only two-year school in Ohio to have college-owned residence halls available to its students. Hocking College was first accredited by the North Central Association of Colleges and Schools, Higher Learning Commission (HLC) in 1976. In 1990, the Perry Campus in New Lexington opened to serve the needs of Perry County residents. In 1991, the college's name officially changed for a second time to Hocking College. In 1997, the college purchased Lake Snowden in Albany and in 1998 renamed it as the Lake Snowden Education and Recreation Park.

In August 2008, the Ohio Auditor's office announced an audit of Hocking College to investigate possible financial irregularities. President John Light and his wife, senior vice president Roxanne DuVivier, were found to have taken money illegally from the college. They pled no contest to the charges, were fined, and ordered to pay restitution. Light was replaced by Ron Erickson, who was fired within a month for sending a campus-wide e-mail complaining about micromanagement by the board of trustees; he was reinstated three months later.

In January 2010, a note threatening that black students would be killed on a specific date the following month was found in a dormitory bathroom. The school increased security measures and offered a financial reward for information leading to arrest. Two black students who feared for their safety withdrew from the college. This prompted the college to review and revise campus security policies. The college installed security cameras throughout each dormitory and hired additional residence hall staff.

On July 27, 2021, Hocking College police officer Cecil Morrison shot and killed 37-year-old Michael Whitmer while responding to a domestic dispute call as Whitmer attempted to drive away. A Nelsonville officer was hit by ricocheted bullets. Morrison, who was hired by the Nelsonville police department after the shooting, later pleaded no contest to a negligent homicide charge. He surrendered his law enforcement powers.

In addition to the main campus, Hocking College owns and operates Lake Snowden, a 670 acres (2.7 km^{2}) recreation area in Lee Township. They also own 1,400 acres (5.7 km^{2}) of open-space land in the rugged landscape of York Township, west of the campus.

== Academics ==
The college offers programs within the areas of Allied Health; Arts, Business and Science; Engineering and Information Technology; Hospitality; Natural Resources; Nursing; and Public Safety Services.

== Research ==
Hocking College became one of two licensed cannabis testing laboratories for Ohio in 2018. In early 2018, the Ohio Department of Commerce licensed Hocking College to test Ohio's medical marijuana before it is passed through the state-regulated supply chain. Jonathan Cachat, Director of Laboratory Sciences, led the development of these cannabis focused initiatives. The college's medical and chemical laboratory, confirmed by the Ohio Department of Higher Education, tests available supplies for common cannabinoids (delta-9-THC, cannabidiol, and cannabinol), purity, potency, and chemical content. In July 2018, The Ohio Department of Higher Education confirmed the college's associates programs in Applied Science and Laboratory Science. The laboratory is located in the historic downtown area of Nelsonville. The lab will also be used in courses related to a new major in the associate degree in Laboratory Sciences program, Cannabis Laboratory, beginning in early 2019.

== Notable alumni ==
- Caden Cox, first person with Down syndrome to play and score in an NCAA or NJCAA football game; also first student athlete at the college to sign a name, image, and likeness (NIL) contract with a local business (with Rocky Brands)
- John Freshwater, high school science teacher
- Kansei Matsuzawa, Japanese professional football kicker
- Ann Maria Nankabirwa, Ugandan politician
