= Nelsonville, Ohio =

City in Ohio, US

- City
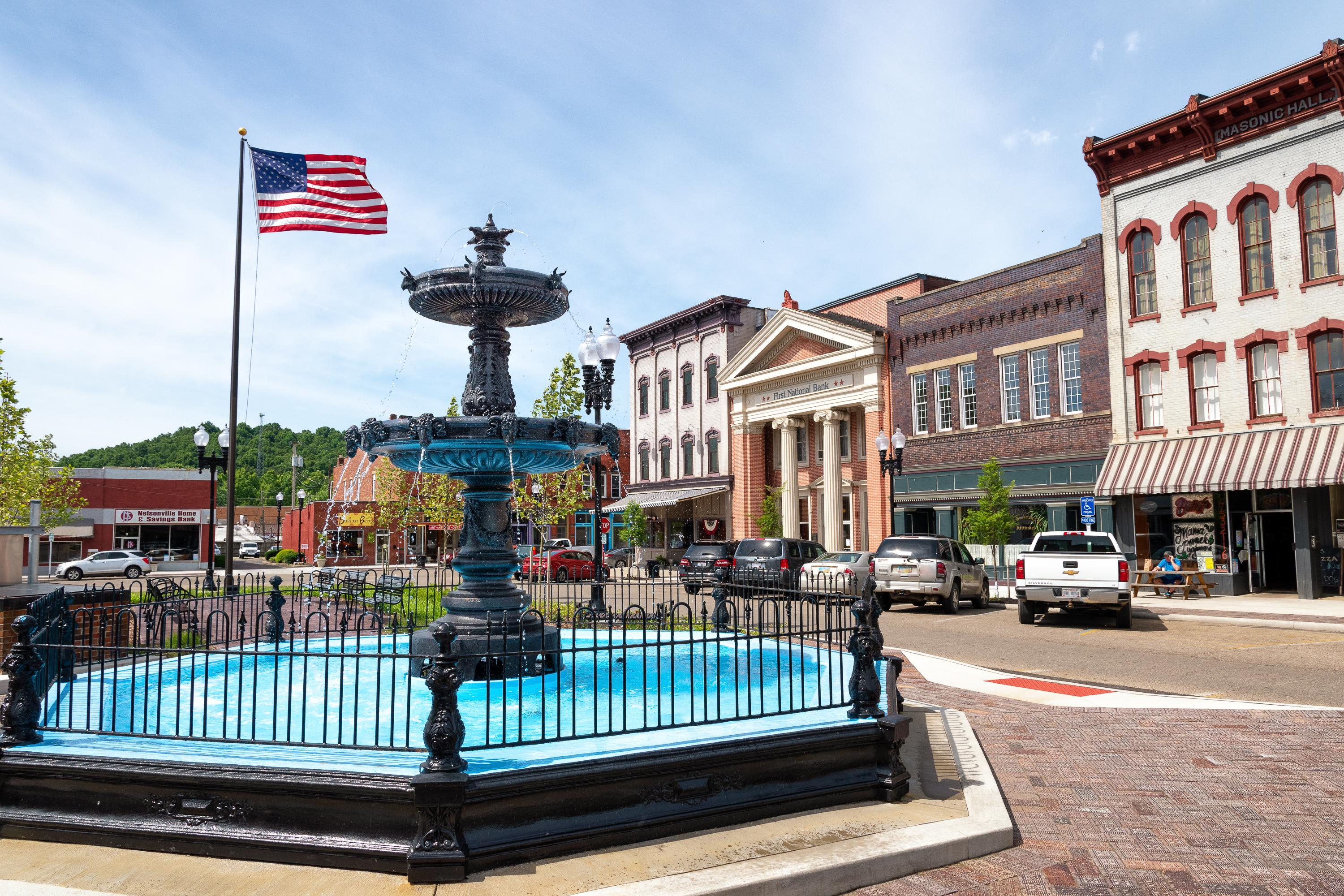
- Nelsonville Historic District in 2019

- Seal

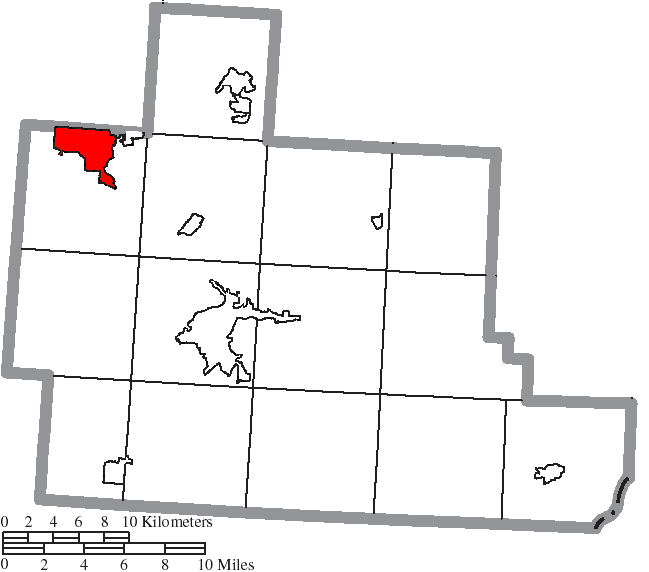
- Location of Nelsonville in Athens County

- Location within Ohio Location within the United States
- Coordinates: 39°27′32″N 82°14′10″W
- Country: United States
- State: Ohio
- County: Athens
- Township: York
- Established: 1814 (settled); 1838 (incorporated)

Area
  - Total: 4.78 sq mi (12.39 km^{2})
  - Land: 4.68 sq mi (12.12 km^{2})
  - Water: 0.10 sq mi (0.27 km^{2})
- Elevation: 702 ft (214 m)

Population (2020)
  - Total: 4,612
  - Density: 985.8/sq mi (380.62/km^{2})
- Time zone: UTC-5 (Eastern (EST))
  - Summer (DST): UTC-4 (EDT)
- ZIP code: 45764
- Area code: 740
- FIPS code: 39-53886
- GNIS feature ID: 2395168
- Website: cityofnelsonville.org

Nelsonville is a city in northwestern Athens County, Ohio, United States, located about 60 miles (97 km) southeast of Columbus. The population was 5,373 at the 2020 census. It is home to Hocking College as well as Rocky Brands. Nelsonville is surrounded by Ohio's only national forest, the Wayne National Forest.

== History ==
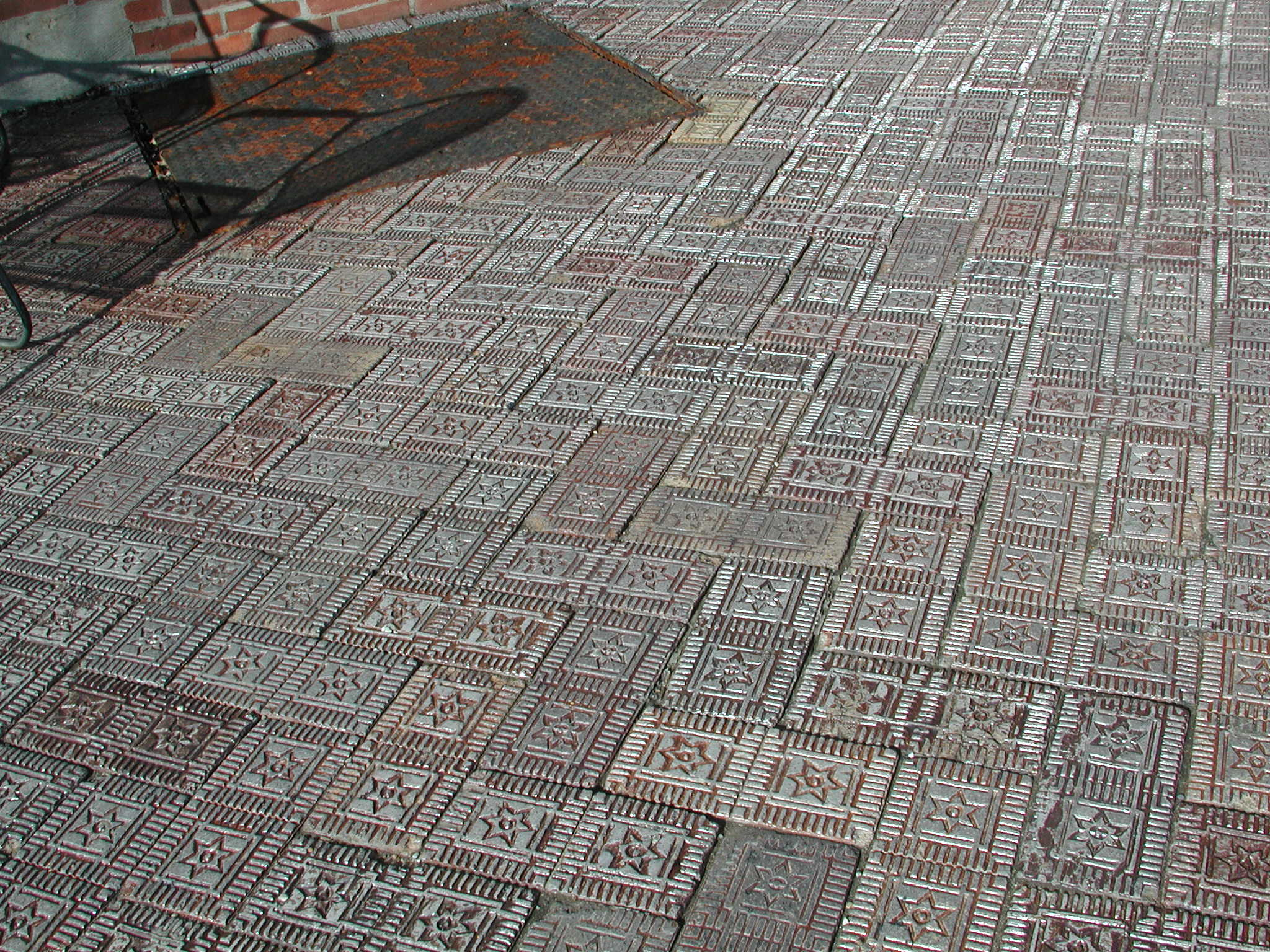
Star brick sidewalk

First settled in 1814 by Daniel Nelson, Nelsonville was incorporated in 1838 with Charles Cable as its first mayor. Nelsonville blossomed into a classic Appalachian town by the mid-19th century, relying on the extractive industries of coal, clay and salt. Like many large mining towns, Nelsonville was home to a large hotel, The Dew House, and a thriving theater, Stuart's Opera House, both located on the Public Square.

During the American Civil War's famed Morgan's Raid, Confederate cavalry under Brig. Gen. John Hunt Morgan paused in Nelsonville in July 1863 and burned ten wooden canal boats. However, the 400 confederates failed to destroy a covered bridge over the Hocking Canal when citizens rushed to extinguish the blaze after the raiders rode off. This allowed Union cavalry to continue their pursuit of the fleeing Confederates when they arrived in Nelsonville two hours later. Upon arriving in town, the Union cavalry was delighted that the townspeople had prepared a feast for them.

In 1888, Nelsonville became the first city in the United States west of the Allegheny Mountains to have citywide electric street lights.

Nelsonville was admitted into the national Main Street Program and named a Preserve America Community. The central business district has also been placed on the National Register of Historic Places, and both the Dew House and Stuart's Opera House have been listed separately. Nelsonville was home to a number of companies that used the area's dense clay to produce many different types of bricks, particularly glazed paving bricks, some with a distinctive star pattern. Many of the sidewalks in the public square and historic district contain these bricks.

== Geography ==
Nelsonville is located along the Hocking River; Monday Creek flows through the eastern part of the city. One of the main streets, Canal Street, is located over where the old Hocking Canal once ran.

According to the United States Census Bureau, the city has a total area of 5.00 square miles (12.95 km^{2}), of which 4.89 square miles (12.67 km^{2}) is land and 0.11 square miles (0.28 km^{2}) is water.

Nelsonville is located on U.S. Route 33. A bypass was completed in December 2013 for the city.

== Demographics ==
Historical population
Census	Pop.	Note	%±
1830	73		—
1860	741		—
1870	1,080		45.7%
1880	3,095		186.6%
1890	4,558		47.3%
1900	5,421		18.9%
1910	6,082		12.2%
1920	6,440		5.9%
1930	5,322		−17.4%
1940	5,368		0.9%
1950	4,845		−9.7%
1960	4,834		−0.2%
1970	4,812		−0.5%
1980	4,567		−5.1%
1990	4,563		−0.1%
2000	5,230		14.6%
2010	5,392		3.1%
2020	4,612		−14.5%

=== 2020 census ===
As of the 2020 census, Nelsonville had a population of 4,612, though the count was revised to 5,373 after being challenged by city administration. The median age was 30.2 years. 18.6% of residents were under the age of 18 and 12.9% of residents were 65 years of age or older. For every 100 females there were 107.5 males, and for every 100 females age 18 and over there were 107.9 males age 18 and over.

86.1% of residents lived in urban areas, while 13.9% lived in rural areas.

There were 1,821 households in Nelsonville, of which 25.7% had children under the age of 18 living in them. Of all households, 27.6% were married-couple households, 25.0% were households with a male householder and no spouse or partner present, and 34.4% were households with a female householder and no spouse or partner present. About 39.3% of all households were made up of individuals and 12.7% had someone living alone who was 65 years of age or older.

There were 2,234 housing units, of which 18.5% were vacant. The homeowner vacancy rate was 2.1% and the rental vacancy rate was 11.5%.

Racial composition as of the 2020 census
Race	Number	Percent
White	4,112	89.2%
Black or African American	206	4.5%
American Indian and Alaska Native	21	0.5%
Asian	17	0.4%
Native Hawaiian and Other Pacific Islander	0	0.0%
Some other race	35	0.8%
Two or more races	221	4.8%
Hispanic or Latino (of any race)	86	1.9%

=== 2010 census ===
As of the census of 2010, there were 5,392 people, 1,969 households, and 920 families residing in the city. The population density was 1,102.7 inhabitants per square mile (425.8/km^{2}). There were 2,257 housing units at an average density of 461.6 per square mile (178.2/km^{2}). The racial makeup of the city was 94.2% White, 2.8% African American, 0.5% Native American, 0.3% Asian, 0.1% Pacific Islander, 0.4% from other races, and 1.7% from two or more races. Hispanic or Latino of any race were 1.4% of the population.

There were 1,969 households, of which 25.5% had children under the age of 18 living with them, 26.4% were married couples living together, 14.7% had a female householder with no husband present, 5.7% had a male householder with no wife present, and 53.3% were non-families. 36.3% of all households were made up of individuals, and 9.2% had someone living alone who was 65 years of age or older. The average household size was 2.24 and the average family size was 2.96.

The median age in the city was 25.1 years. 17.4% of residents were under the age of 18; 32.4% were between the ages of 18 and 24; 24.4% were from 25 to 44; 16.7% were from 45 to 64; and 9% were 65 years of age or older. The gender makeup of the village was 54.8% male and 45.2% female.

== Tourism ==
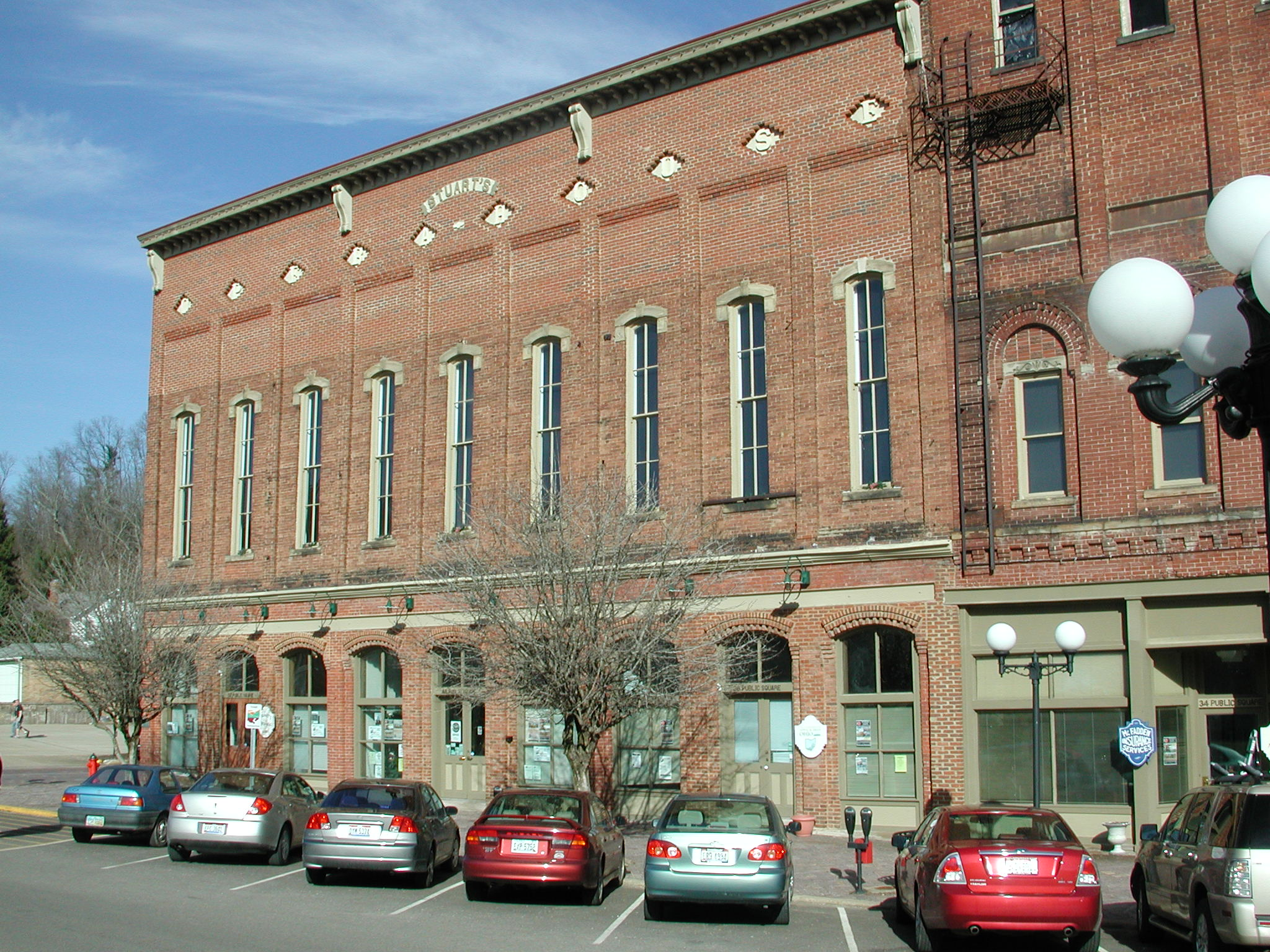
Stuart's Opera House

Nelsonville's Public Square, adorned with local Star Bricks, is home to several shops, restaurants, business offices and financial institutions. Stuart's Opera House, built in 1879, is Ohio's last remaining fully operating 2nd story opera house, and is located on the Nelsonville's Public Square. Stuart's hosts over 75 events a year including: the Annual Nelsonville Music Festival, concerts, plays, films, art and more. Several theater groups perform at Stuart's, including the local Athenian Berean Community (ABC) Players. The opera house also offers private events for weddings, receptions and special community events. The Dew Hotel is also located on the Public Square. The former hotel has a noted balcony where President William Howard Taft, President William McKinley, President Warren G. Harding and President Theodore Roosevelt all campaigned.

Rocky Brands was founded in Nelsonville in 1932 as the Wm. Brooks Co. and the corporate headquarters are still located in the city. The former shoe factory now serves as the Rocky Outdoor Gear Store, and features three floors of outerwear, clothing, home interiors, specialty food products and boots.

The Nelsonville Cross was erected on Kontner's Hill in April, 1973. It is a Memorial Cross to Mrs. Elizabeth Smith Schwartz by her husband Mr. Walter L. Schwartz. Mr. Schwartz wanted to honor his wife by sharing their faith with their hometown, where they grew up together and later married. The body of the cross is 4.5 feet by 4.5 feet, the cross arm is 25 feet in length and the body is 65 feet tall, anchored to a base of concrete which rises 8 feet above the hilltop. Manufactured of metal of special composition which includes steel and aluminum, it bears a porcelain white color. Newspapers in all parts of America and Europe have carried photographs of it as the "World's Largest Metal Cross", illuminated at night. Nelsonville has received much publicity from its location.

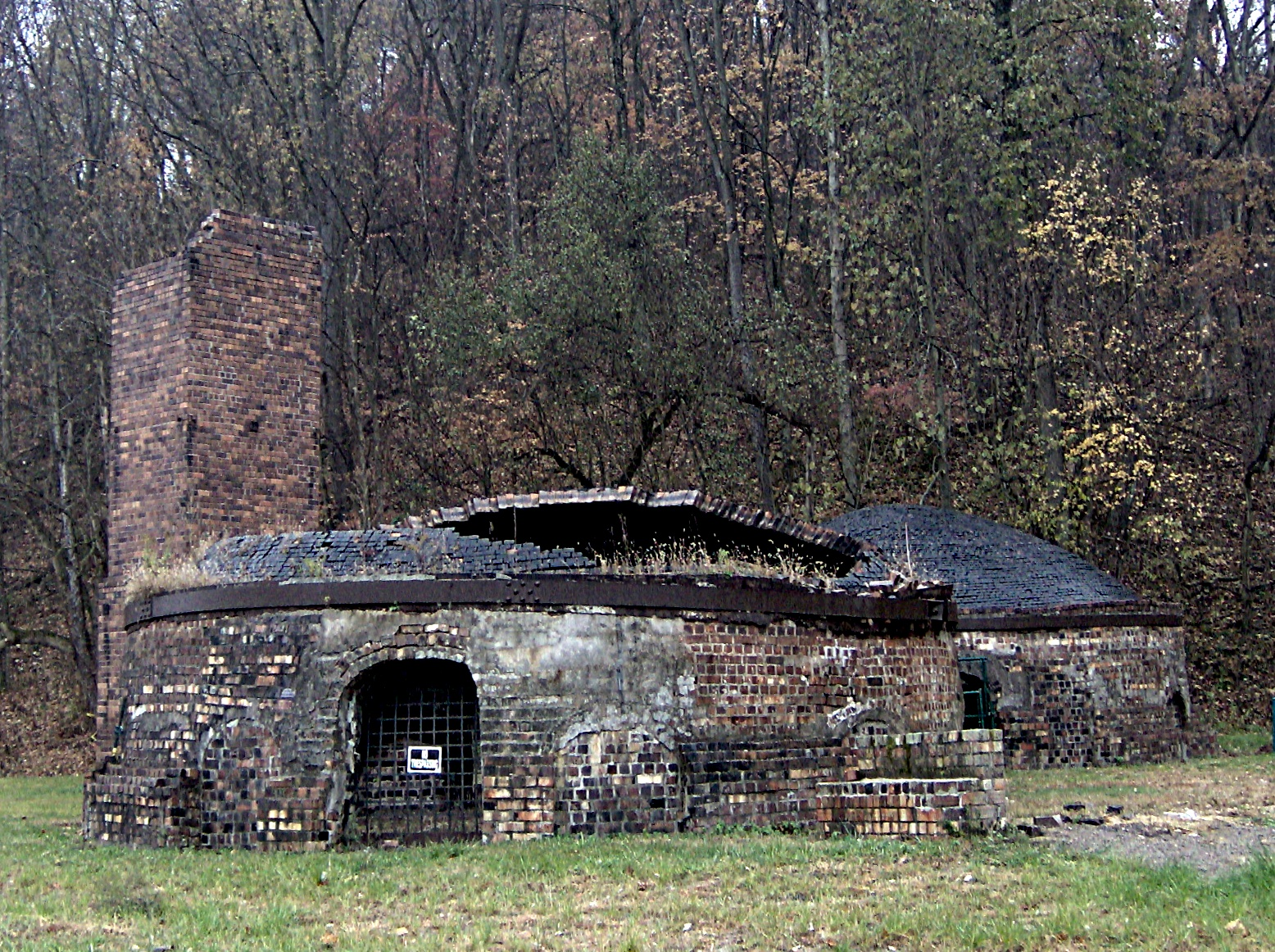
Kilns at Brick Kiln Park, the grounds of the former Nelsonville Brick Company

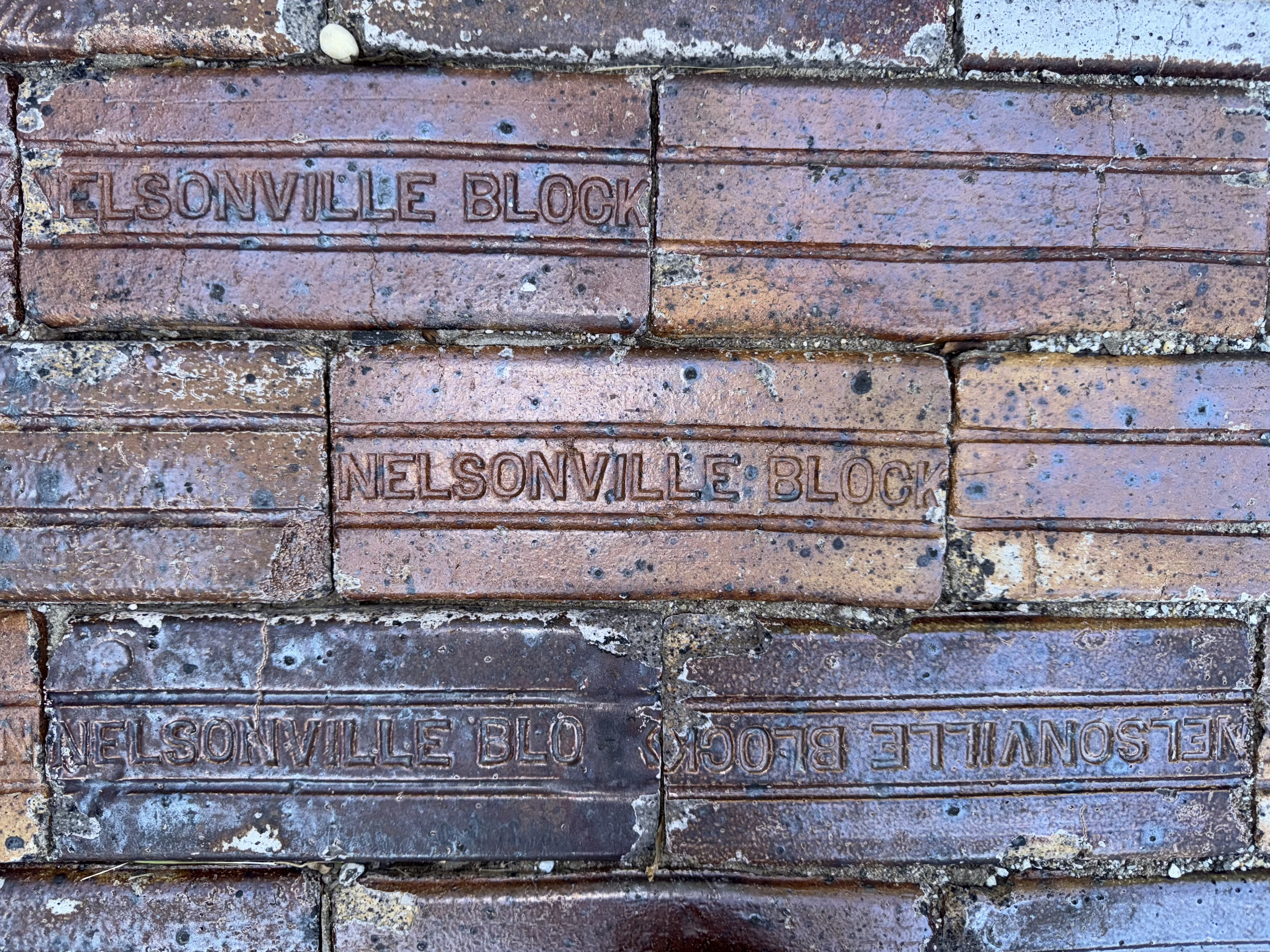
1908 Main Street Nelsonville Block bricks were preserved in Valparaiso, IN in 2025

The Brick Kiln Park is located on the grounds of the former Nelsonville Brick Company. In the 19th century, the Hocking Valley was known for its abundance of natural resources, particularly clay. Numerous brick companies began to form after the iron furnaces went out of blast. One of the first to emerge was the Nelsonville Brick Company. In 1877, the Nelsonville Brick Company began their extensive operation. The Nelsonville Block, Hallwood Block, Hocking Block, and the Star Brick were all manufactured by them. In 1880, more kilns and stacks were constructed as an expansion. Nearly twenty-five million blocks and bricks were manufactured each year to keep up with the high demand. The railroads stayed busy transporting their products throughout the Midwest. The blocks and bricks manufactured in Nelsonville were very popular. One of them in particular was known as the king of all pavers, the Nelsonville Block. The salt glazed surface not only made it watertight, it also gave it a distinct and attractive finish. In 1904, the Nelsonville Block won first prize at the World's Fair in St. Louis. The Great Depression, combined with the use of concrete, led to the demise of the Nelsonville Brick Company. In 1937, the plant closed down. Although the main plant is gone, a few kilns and stacks, which were part of the expansion in 1880, still remain. An effort is underway to save the remaining kilns and stacks.

Hocking College provides several tourist opportunities in Nelsonville. One stop at Hocking is Robins Crossing, a restored pioneer village located on both the Hocking Valley Scenic Railway train route and the Hockhocking Adena Bikeway. This collection of restored log cabins showcases pioneer life, and includes a general store, school house, and a blacksmith's shop. During the warm season, demonstrations are performed at Robins Crossing on most Saturdays and Sundays, and the Hocking Valley Scenic Railway is available to experience the village. Hocking Technical College also is home to Hocking Woods Nature Center where visitors can learn about animals native to the region.

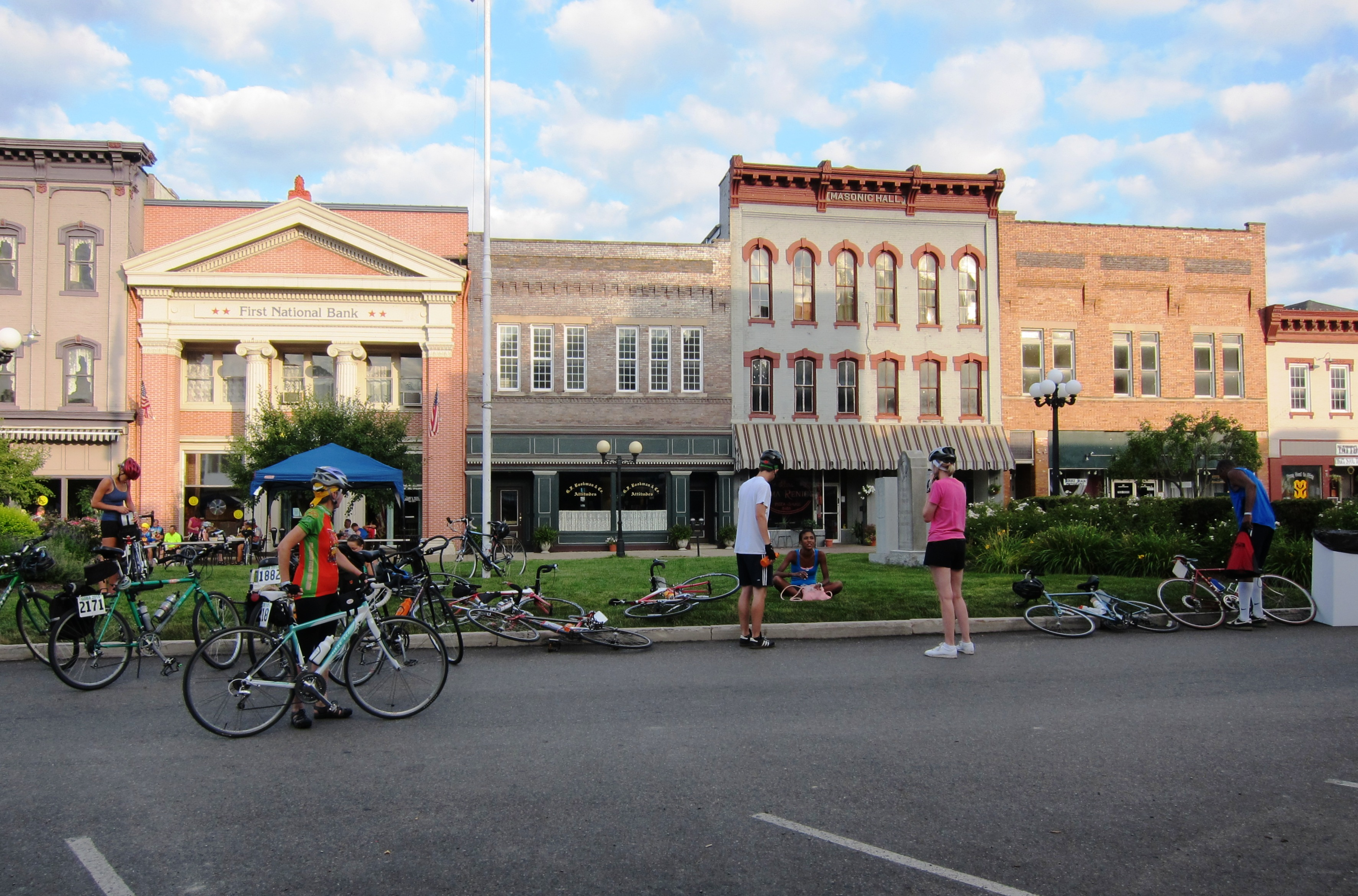
Cyclists stop along their way to the Hockhocking Adena Bikeway

The Hockhocking Adena Bikeway, an 22-mile (35 km) long bicycle path, connects Nelsonville with the county seat of Athens. The Nelsonville portion of the bikeway runs from the Inn at Hocking College to the Nelsonville Public Square district. It is designed for walking, running, biking, cross-country skiing, skating, and wheelchairs.

The Hocking Valley Scenic Railway began as part of the historic Hocking Valley Railway in the early 1870s. Today, the railway offers scenic excursions from Nelsonville to Logan, traversing the Hocking Hills. Known mainly for their specialty trains, the Hocking Valley Scenic Railway hosts thousands of passengers each year. Seasonal train rides include: Easter Train, Robbery Trains, North Pole Express, Fall Foliage Trips, Haunted Hills Train, Santa Train, Caboose Train, Great Hocking Valley Train Pull, dinner and wine trains. During World War II, the original Hocking Valley Railroad ran 138 steam locomotives, 70 passenger cars and 15,000 freight cars along 340 route-miles of track. Today, the trains of the Hocking Valley Scenic Railway again pull out of Nelsonville, for pleasure this time, to take passengers on scenic journeys through Southeastern Ohio. Two train rides depart from the railroad depot at U.S. Rt. 33 and the Hocking Parkway Drive on Saturdays and Sundays, Memorial Day Weekend through the end of October, in addition to the seasonal train rides. The Nelsonville Yards were once the busiest railroad yards in the entire state of Ohio.

The Wayne National Forest, the only national forest in Ohio, surrounds the city of Nelsonville. The Wayne National Forest is a patchwork of public land that covers over a quarter million acres of Appalachian foothills of southeastern Ohio. The Forest is divided into three units managed out of two Ranger District offices located in Nelsonville and Ironton, with a field office in Marietta. The forest headquarters are located just outside the city limits on US Route 33, overlooking the Hocking River. It includes Ohio's largest collection of ATV trails. Tourist activities include: hiking, canoeing, mountain biking, ATV riding, and bird watching.

== Education ==
The residents of Nelsonville are served locally by the Nelsonville-York City School District and Nelsonville-York High School. Additionally, Tri-County Career Center hosts a joint vocational school district with the following districts participating: Alexander, Athens, Federal-Hocking, Logan, Miller, Nelsonville-York, New Lexington and Trimble Local Schools.

Nelsonville has a public library, which is the main branch of the Athens County Public Libraries. The Athens County Public Library system hosts locations in: Athens, Chauncey, Coolville, Glouster, Nelsonville, The Plains, Wells Library in Albany, and the Bookmobile.

== Notable people ==
- Estel Crabtree, Major League Baseball player
- Robert T. Oestreicher, 45th mayor of Columbus, Ohio
- Sarah Jessica Parker, award-winning actress
- James B. Preston, professor at SUNY Upstate Medical University
- Eugenia Sheppard, American fashion writer and newspaper columnist
- Phebe Sudlow, professor at University of Iowa
- Erica Terwillegar, American Olympic luger
- Lloyd Thomas, naval aviator
- Jacqueline Woodson, award-winning children's author
- Catherine Woolley, neuroendocrinologist
- Dave Wyatt, negro leagues infielder and manager
