= Sells Park =

Park in Athens, Ohio, United States

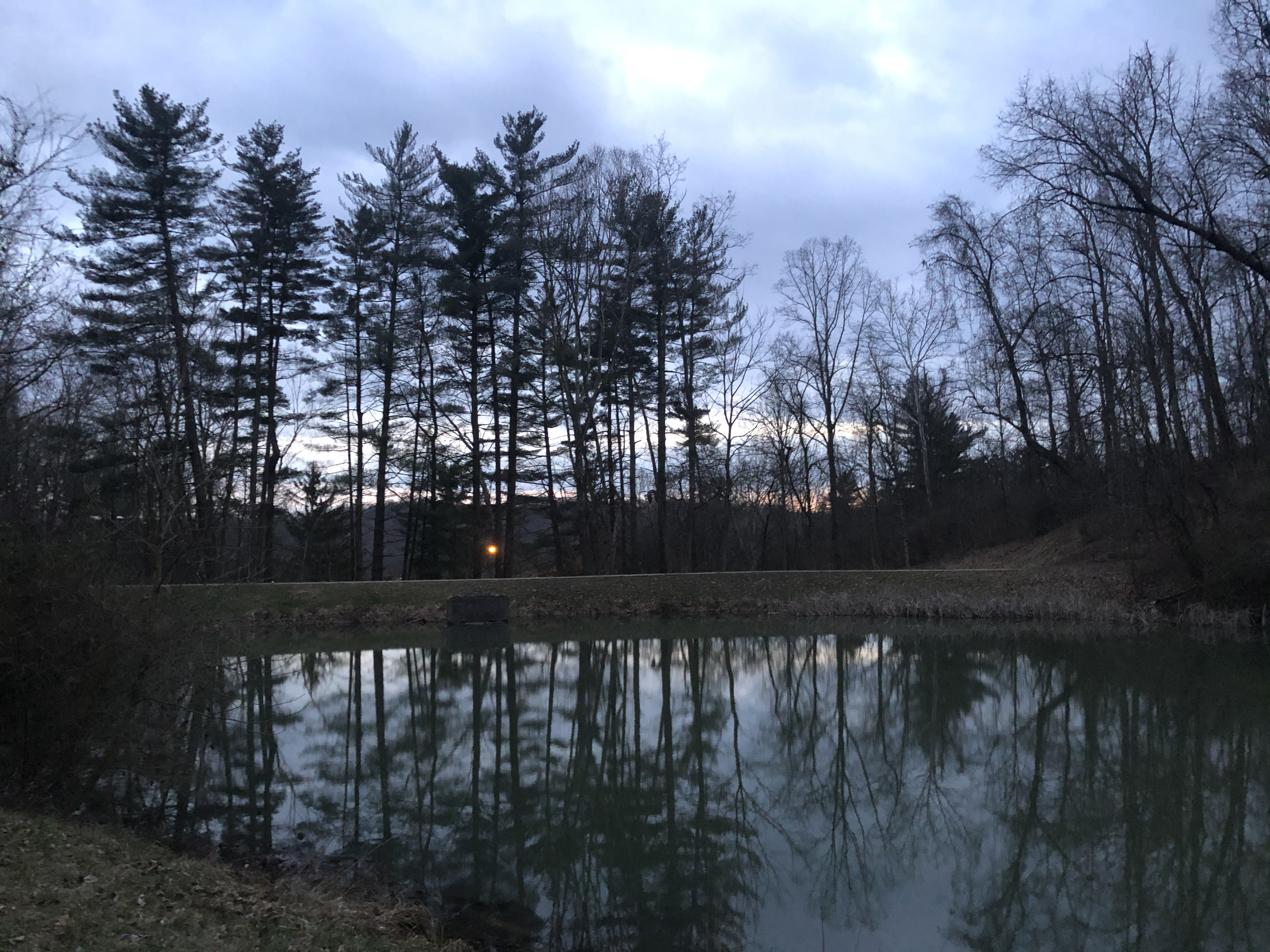
- Sunset on Sells
- Interactive map of Sells Park
- Location: Athens County, Ohio
- Coordinates: 39°20′43″N 82°04′30″W
- Area: 22.5 acres (0.091 km^{2})
- Operator: Ohio University
- Website: www.ci.athens.oh.us/581/Sells-Park

Sells Park, popularly known as Athens Pond, is a public park near Ohio University in Athens, Ohio. Claimed to be "one of Athens’s best hidden treasures", it comprises 22.5 acres (91,000 m^{2}), and includes Sells Pond (Athens Pond) which is composed of an area of 1,876 square yards (1,569 m^{2}).

== Accessibility ==
The park can be reached from uptown Athens by traveling on the bike path to the Athens Community Center (Rec Center), crossing East State Street to the Far East Side Neighborhood, and reaching the top of Avon Place. There are two entrances to the top (Sells Pond): a left entrance composed of two meter by two meter concrete tiles, and a right entrance composed of dirt. The left entrance was, prior to 2015, composed of dirt with no wooden steps, while the right entrance contained, prior to 2017, several three-meter-long rectangular wooden steps.

== Park Trails ==
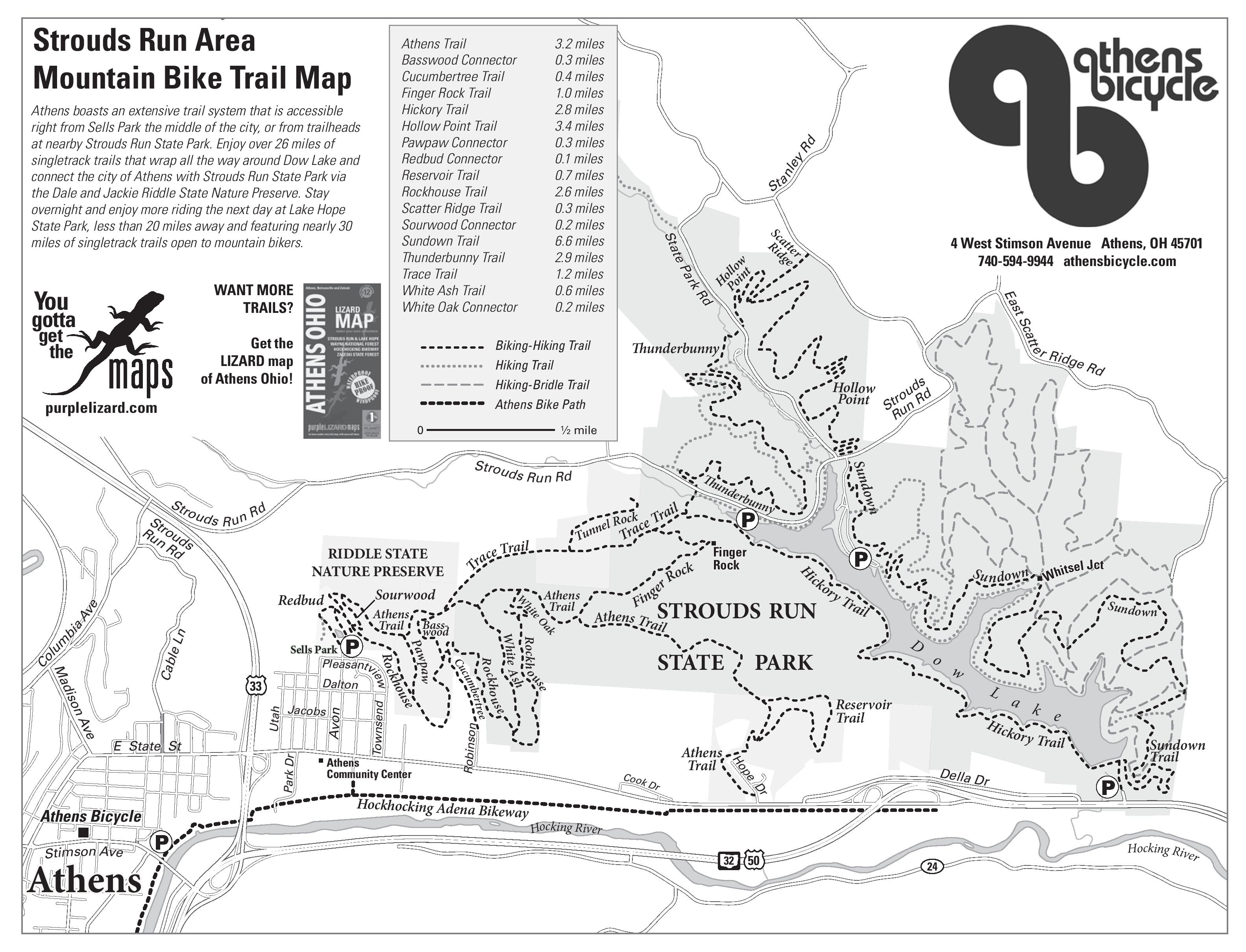
A trail map of Sells Park and Strouds Run.

Sells Park is part of The Athens Trail Network, a network of multi-use trails originating from Sells Park itself maintained by community and university volunteers. Twelve interconnected trails branch out into the surrounding woodland, heading eastwards to eventually connect with the trails of Strouds Run State Park around its Dow Lake. While the trails are primarily designed for hiking, running, and biking, some sections are for solely pedestrians.

Along the trails there are wooden markers providing informative details, as well as signs at forks showing the trails’ names and where each direction leads. The trails provide scenic views of the East State commercial area and travel along notable features such as Sells Pond, Hawk Woods, Boulder Cove, Turtlehead Cave (Blue Ash Rockhouse), Finger Rock, and Pioneer Cemetery.

Dow Lake is also accessible via Sells Park's connection with Strouds Run State Park via The Athens Trail Network.

== History ==
In 1939, the Sells family ceded the park to the state government. It was subsequently given to the City of Athens in 1979.

Located 3 yards to the right a memorial bench dedicated in 2011 on the pond's right end lies a barely visible cement foundation of an old bathroom building that once stood there, demolished in the 1990s.

On the side of the pond closest to the two paths that lead up to the park, there is a cement support structure of a fishing platform. Following the prohibition of fishing in the park due to city guidelines upon the park's transfer to city ownership in 1979, it was partially demolished. Below the cement support structure, there is a controlled aqueduct leading to the Hocking River.

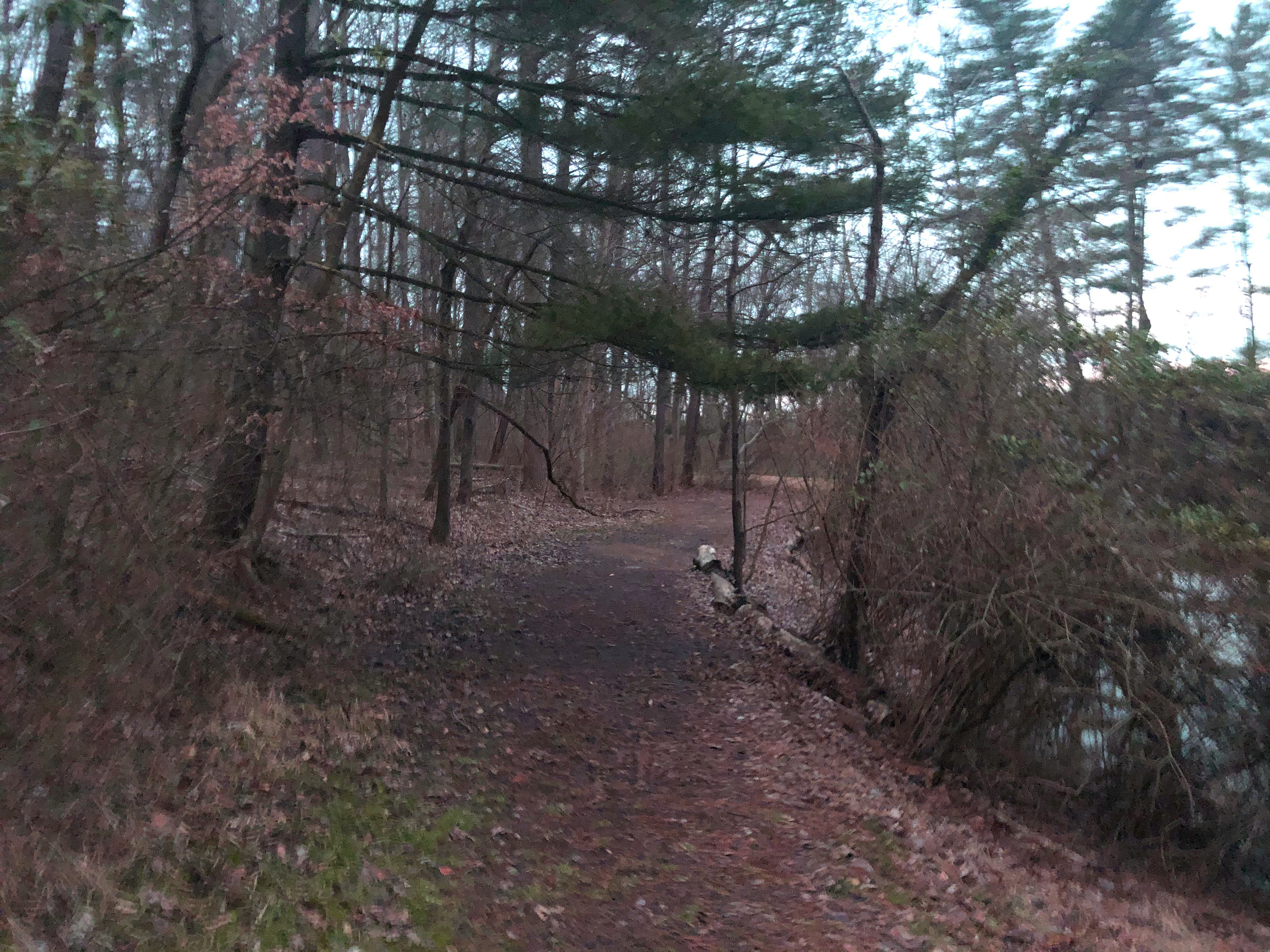
The beginning of a trail at Sells Park

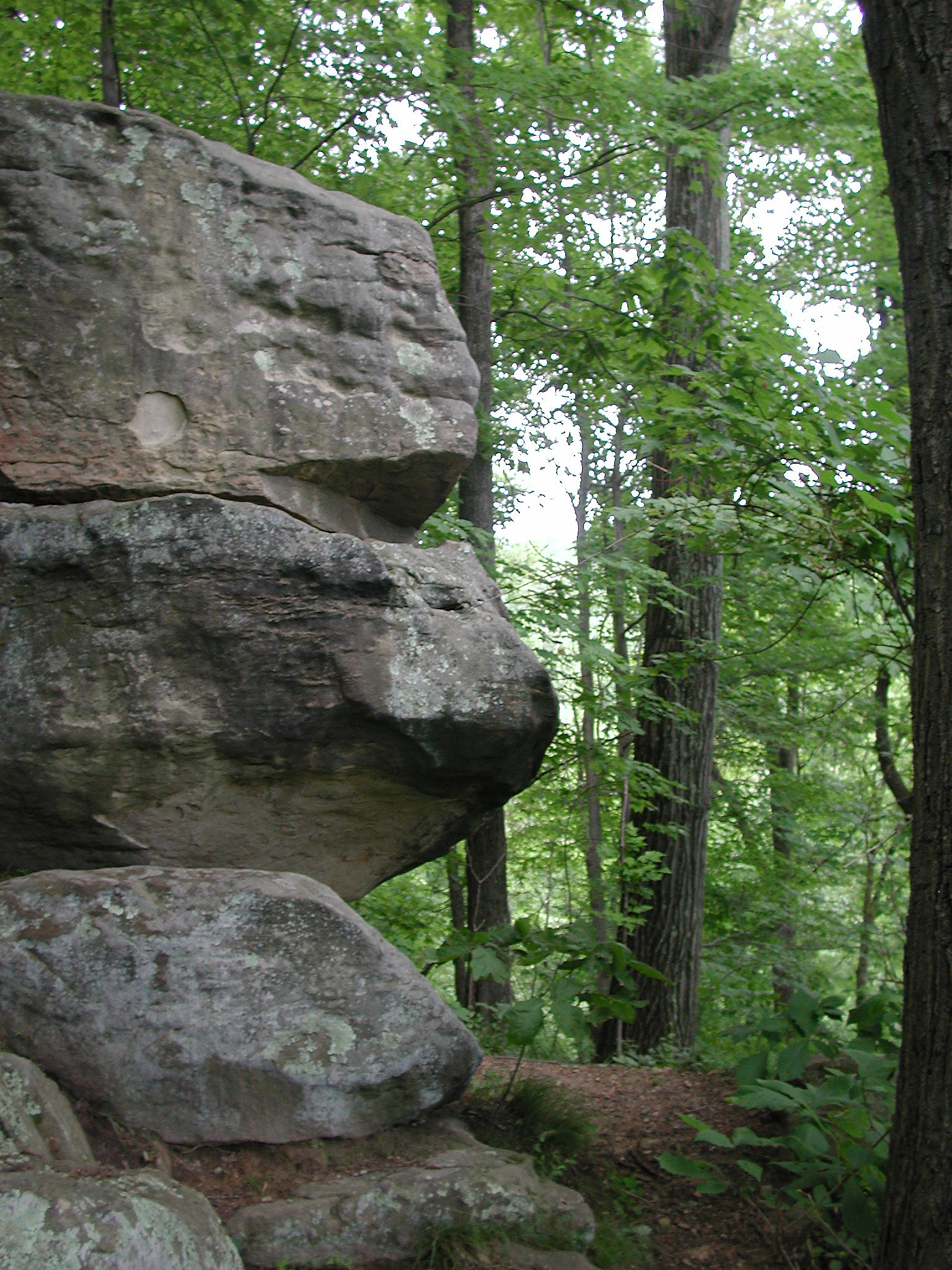
Sells Park Lookout

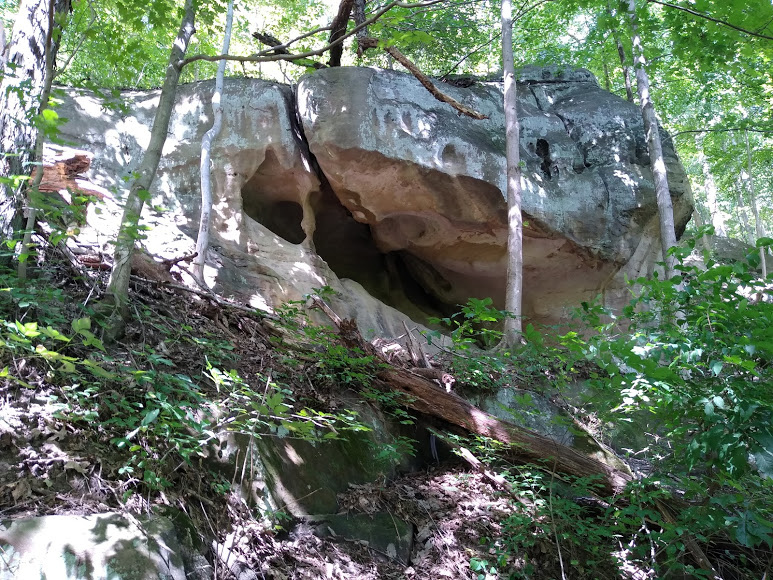
The Rockhouse
