= Athens Conservancy =

501 (c) (3) land trust based in Athens County, Ohio

- Type: Nonprofit
- Tax ID no.: 32-0035073
- Purpose: conservation
- Headquarters: Athens, Ohio
- Website: www.athensconservancy.org

The Athens Conservancy is a 501 (c) (3) land trust based in Athens County, Ohio. It was founded in 2002. It is an all-volunteer organization.

== Preserves ==
The Conservancy owns and manages 14 nature preserves in Athens County:

- Blair Preserve, 75 acres (30 ha) adjacent to Strouds Run State Park. This preserve, in Canaan Township, was purchased in two sections using Clean Ohio Conservation Fund moneys. The name commemorates Brian Blair, who provided financial backing for the property.

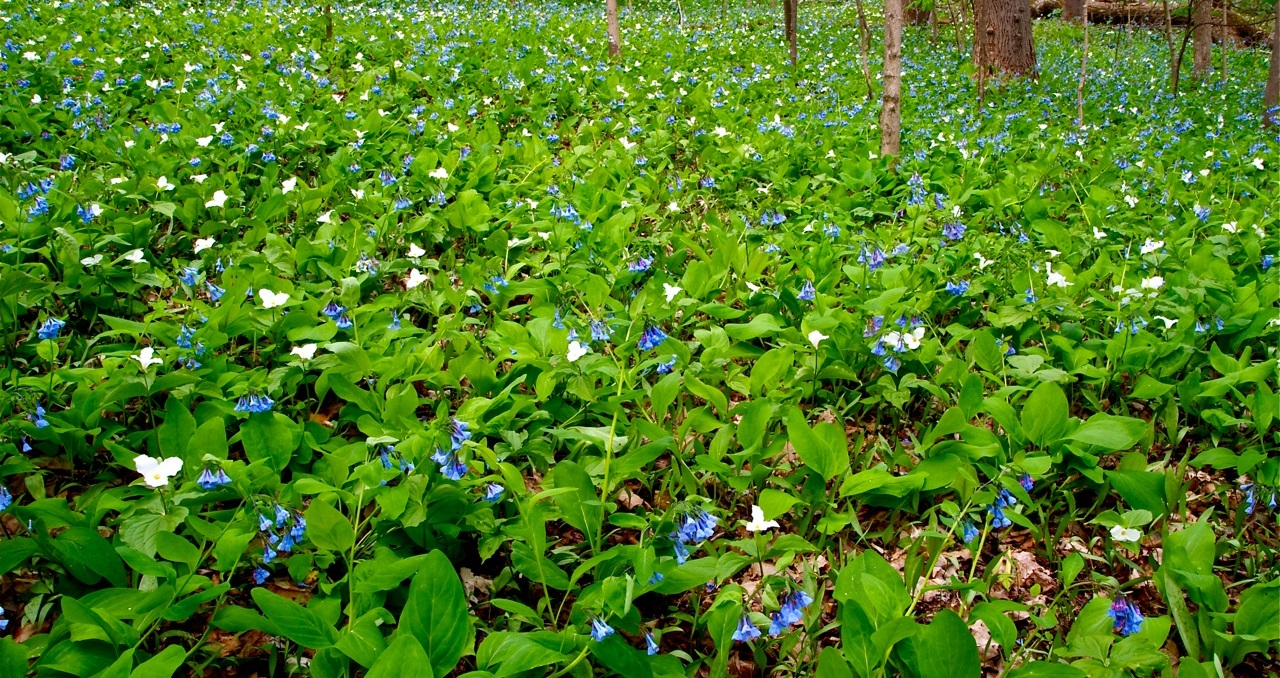
Spring Wildflowers, Bluebell Preserve

- Bluebell Preserve, 230 acres (93 ha) adjacent to the Hockhocking-Adena Bikeway, and bordering the Wayne National Forest to the west. This preserve was created in two phases, 65 acres donated to the Conservancy by AEP in 2006, and 165 acres purchased from AEP using Clean Ohio Conservation Fund moneys in 2018. It is in York and Dover Townships. The name is due to the impressive spring wildflower display on the preserve.
- Brookville Preserve, 18 acres (7.3 ha) on Luhrig Road in Athens Township bordering the proposed extension for the Moonville Rail-Trail. This preserve was purchased from AEP using Clean Ohio Conservation Fund moneys. The name is from the place name of Brookville.
- Canaan Preserve, 441 acres (178 ha) in Canaan Township, connecting the Baker Preserve with Strouds Run State Park. It was purchased in 2019 using Clean Ohio Conservation Fund moneys.
- Mary Beth Zak Lohse Preserve, 283 acres (115 ha) in Athens and Canaan Townships adjacent to Strouds Run State Park, the Blair Preserve (above), and the Riddle State Nature Preserve. It was purchased in 2018 using Clean Ohio Conservation Fund moneys. The name commemorates a local naturalist and environmental activist.
- Morris Preserve, 87 acres (35 ha) on Henderson Road in Carthage Township. It was purchased in 2017 using Clean Ohio Conservation Fund moneys. The name commemorates the former owners, who assisted in the acquisition.
- Elias M. & Therese Erb Poston Preserve, 47 acres (19 ha) roughly divided in half between two sections in York Township. It borders the Hockhocking-Adena Bikeway and the two sections are surrounded on three sides each by the Wayne National Forest. It was purchased in 2015 and 2016 using Clean Ohio Conservation Fund moneys. The name commemorates the former owners.
- Skunk Run Preserve, 73.5 acres (29.7 ha) in Troy Township. It borders the new Athens-Belpre Rail-Trail. It was purchased in 2013, 2016, and 2017 using Clean Ohio Conservation Fund moneys. The name is from the perennial stream that flows through the preserve.
- The Plains Preserve, 13 acres (5.3 ha) in The Plains, Ohio, in Athens Township. This preserve was purchased using Clean Ohio Conservation Fund moneys. This preserve is located adjacent to the Dorr 2 Mound, a Native American burial mound.
- Tucker Run Preserve, 47 acres (19 ha) adjacent to Strouds Run State Park in Canaan Township. This preserve was purchased privately. The name is the central creek that drains the preserve.

In addition, the Conservancy holds a conservation and trail access easement on the 269-acre (109 ha) Baker Preserve, near Strouds Run State Park, which features hiking and horse trails open to the public. This easement was purchased using Clean Ohio Conservation Fund moneys.

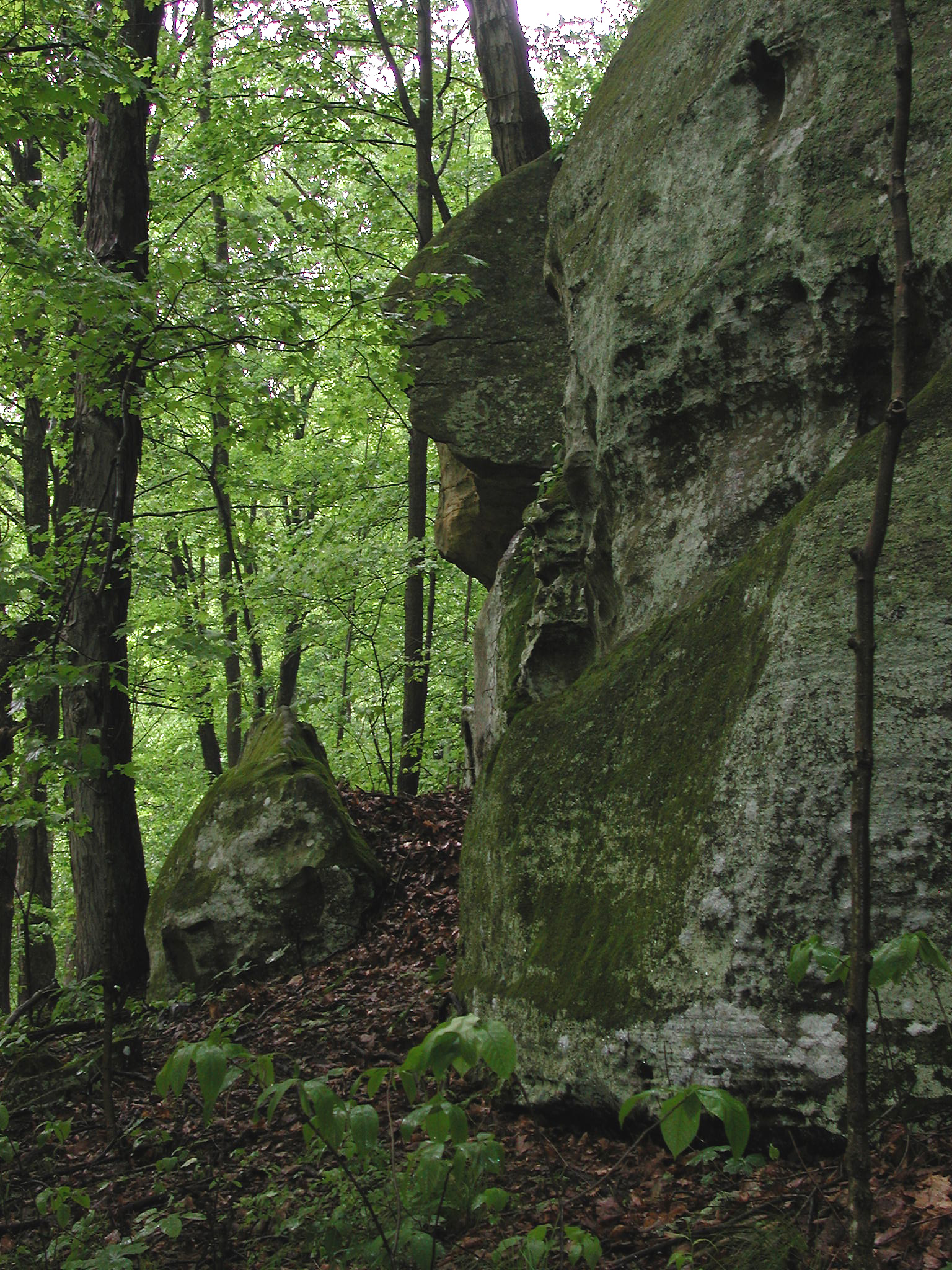
Rock exposure on the Baker Tract

== Outdoor Recreation Programs ==
The Conservancy sponsors the Athens-Belpre Rail-Trail, a new multi-use trail to connect Belpre, Ohio, to Athens, Ohio, partially using the former B&O Railroad grade. The trail is open to foot, bicycles, and horses. Properties for this project have been secured in several ways.

The Conservancy is also working on acquiring land for a trail-head area for the Moonville Rail-Trail, and has acquired additional right-of-way from private property owners who had acquired it from the former B&O Railroad to connect the Moonville Rail-Trail with the Hockhocking Adena Bikeway, using Clean Ohio moneys.

The Conservancy also offers a backpacking campsite on the Blair Preserve. This campsite was created using funds from the Athens County Foundation.

== Assisting Other Agencies ==
One of the Conservancy's greatest successes to date was the establishment of the Riddle State Nature Preserve, which contains Hawk Woods, one of the most significant old-growth forests in Ohio, again using Clean Ohio moneys. The preserve is owned by the city of Athens, Ohio and is dedicated as a state nature preserve, but the Athens Conservancy initiated and coordinated the project, and raised $40,000 in public contributions plus $50,000 from the Ohio Division of Natural Areas and Preserves. The organization also assisted the City of Athens, OH in acquiring two other tracts of the Strouds Ridge Preserve, totalling 182 acres (74 ha), in 2003 and 2004, and assisted Athens County, Ohio in acquiring two nature preserves, one part of the Strouds Ridge Preserve, with 23 acres (9.3 ha), and the Chauncey Canal Trail and Wetland Preserve, 13.5 acres (5.5 ha), in 2016. It has also provided small donations to assist several other agencies with land acquisition.

== Other programs ==
The Conservancy sponsors the Athens Area Outdoor Guide through the website. This is an extensive website that details open-space lands throughout southeast Ohio, with maps and directions for access.

It also provides the Athens Outdoor Guide, Southeast Ohio Mapping Center and an NNIS (non-native invasive species) information center on-line (see at the website, below) as a public service.

Several private conservation easements have also been negotiated with the Conservancy, in order to enhance private property holders' future management of their lands.
