= Strouds Ridge Preserve =

System of trails and forests in Athens, Ohio

- Strouds Ridge
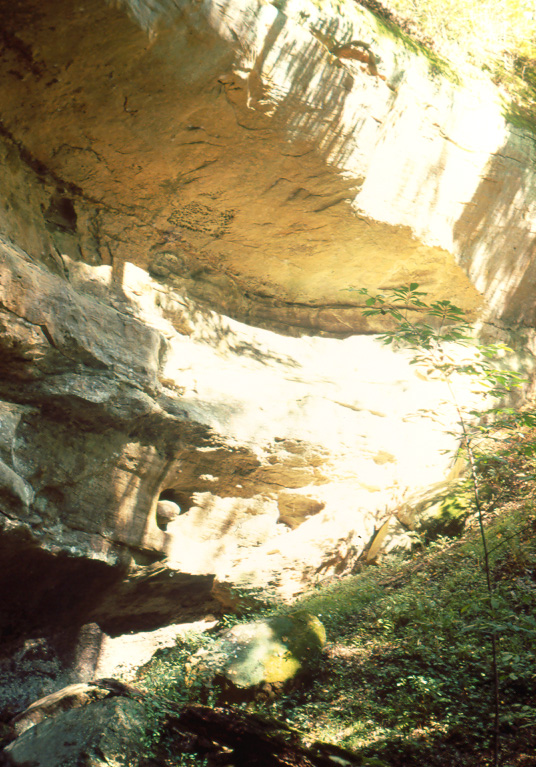
- Turtlehead Cave, Strouds Run State Park

- Location within Ohio Location within the United States
- Location: Athens County
- Nearest city: Athens, Ohio
- Coordinates: 39.345°N 82.066667°W
- Area: 333 acres (135 ha)
- Established: 2002
- Governing body: City of Athens

The Strouds Ridge Preserve is a project of Athens, Ohio, to create a greenbelt buffer and trail system on the outskirts of the city. This effort began in 2002, and has so far involved five parcels of land, for a total of 333-acre (135-hectare), in three discontinuous tracts. All these properties, which include the pre-existing 22-acre (89,000 m^{2}) Sells Park, are contiguous with Strouds Run State Park.

== Property acquisitions ==
One of the acquisitions was subsequently dedicated as the Dale and Jackie Riddle State Nature Preserve, and is otherwise known as Hawk Woods, an 85-acre (340,000 m^{2}) old-growth forest. One of the tracts, the Della Drive Tract, was acquired by Athens County, not the city. Also nearby are the 75-acre (300,000 m^{2})-acre Blair Preserve, the 49-acre (200,000 m^{2})-acre Tucker Run Preserve, the 283-acre (1,150,000 m^{2})-acre Mary Beth Zak Lohse Preserve, the 441-acre (1,780,000 m^{2})-acre Canaan Preserve and the 269-acre (1,090,000 m^{2})-acre Baker Preserve of the Athens Conservancy.

== Trails ==
The trail system is known as the Athens Trail system, and connects with the trails at the state park. The trail system centers around the Athens Trail, currently 3.2 miles (5.1 km) but slated to be a full-loop trail around the City of Athens, and the Rockhouse Trail, a 2.7-mile (4.3 km) scenic trail.

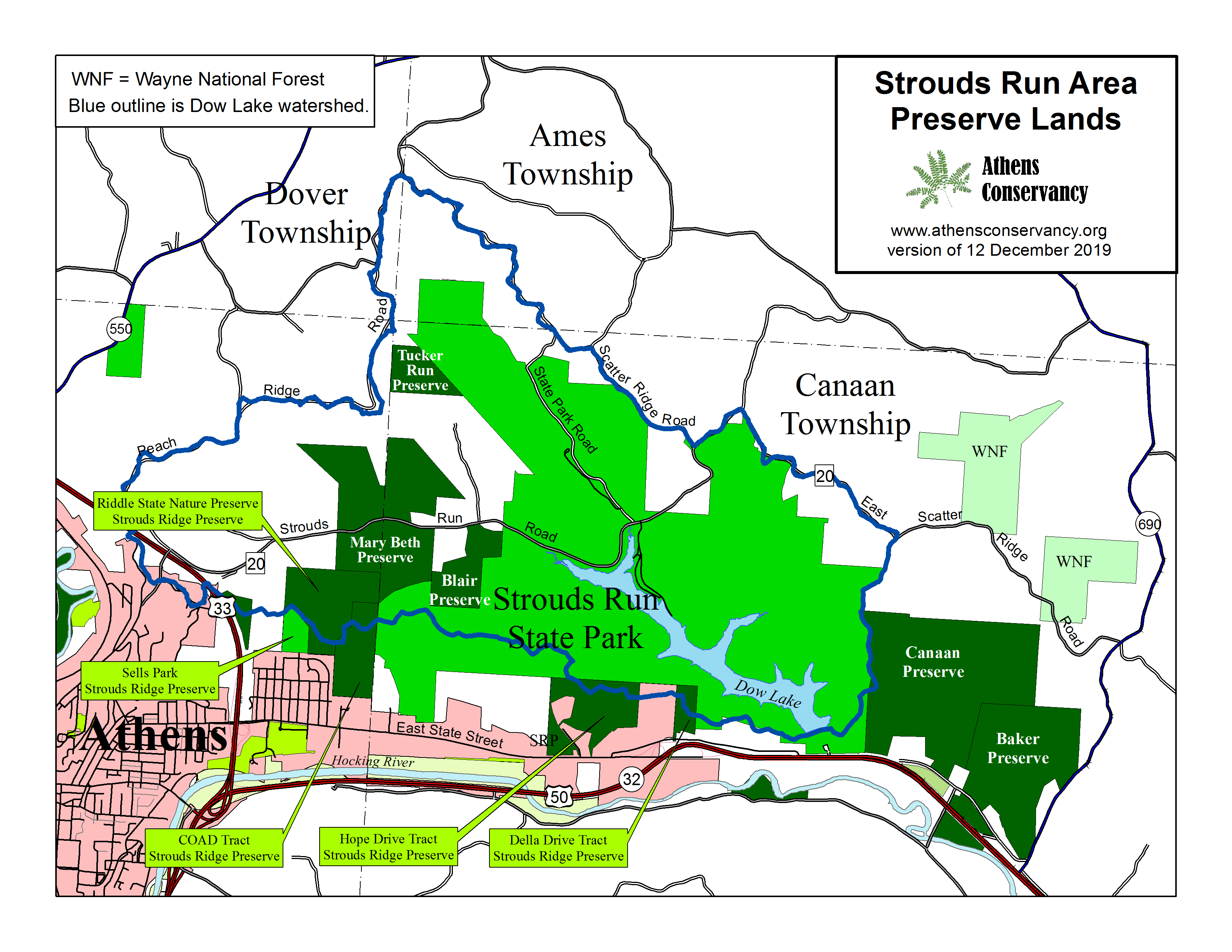
Preserve Lands around Strouds Run State Park
