= Hocking Canal =

19th-century canal in southeastern Ohio

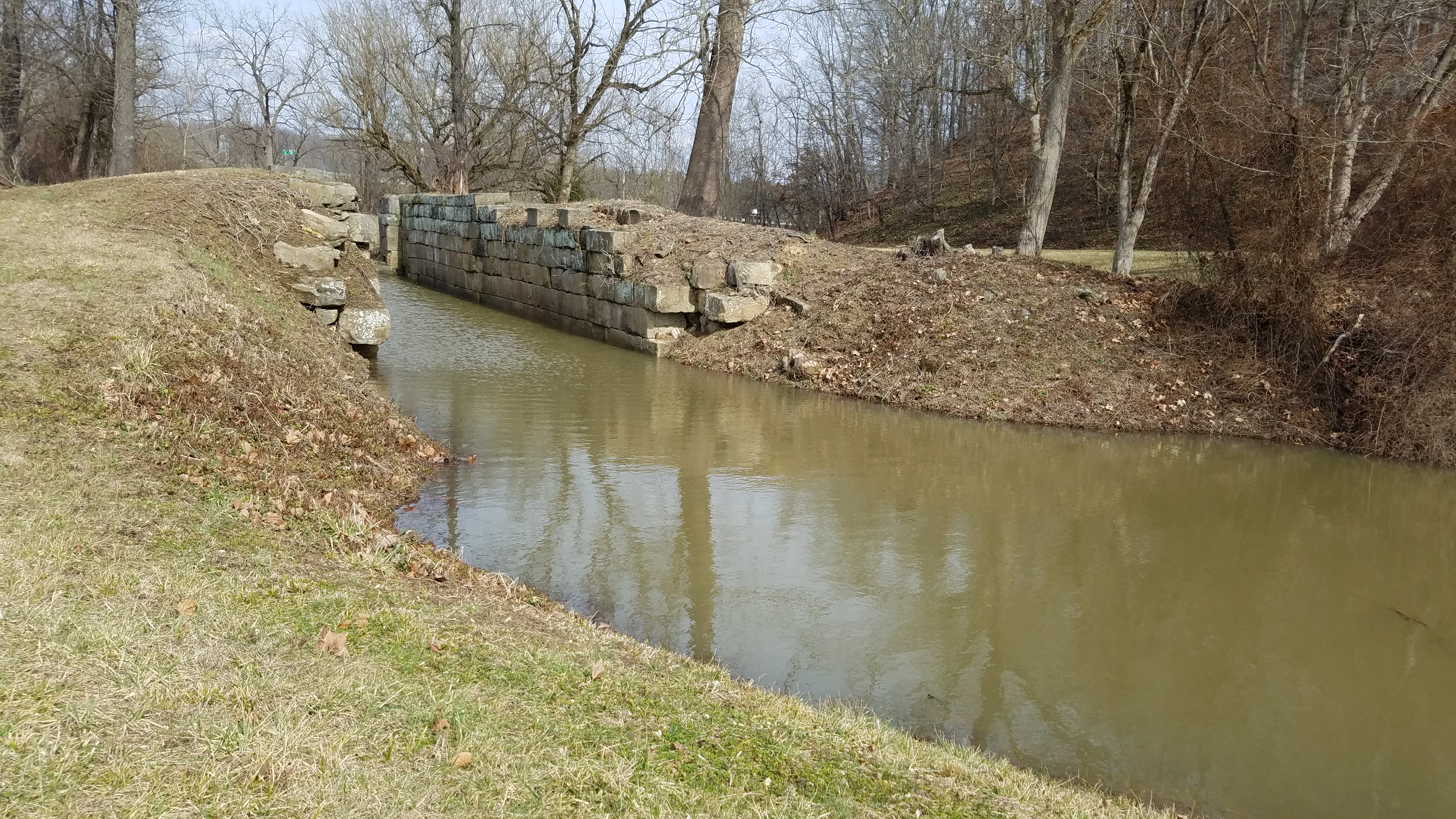
Lock #17 north of Haydenville, Ohio

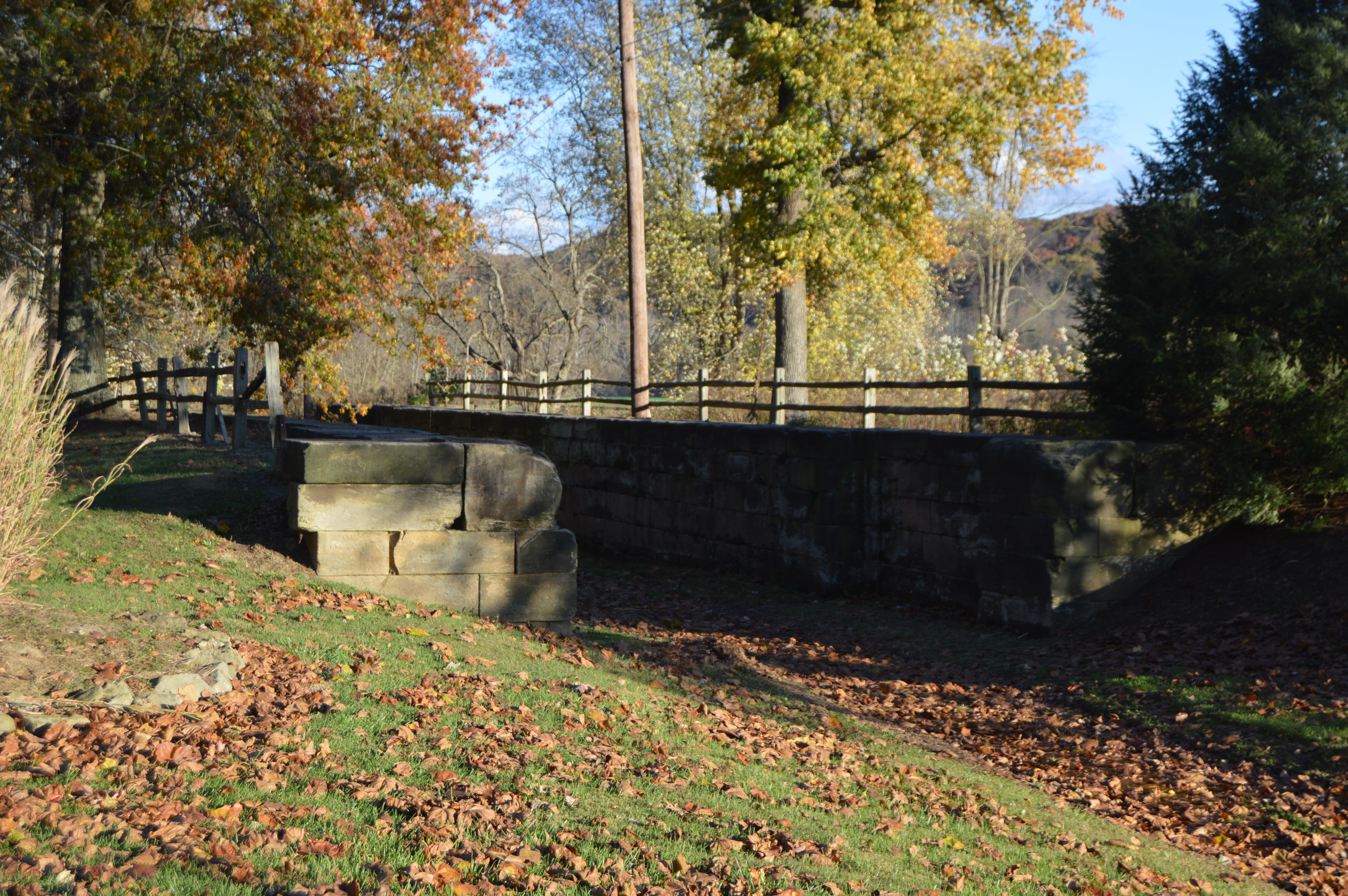
Lock #19

Hocking Canal was a 19th-century canal in southeastern Ohio that extended from Carroll to Athens, following the Hocking River through the Hocking Valley. A branch of the Ohio and Erie Canal, it was completed in 1843 and operated until its decline in the late 1800s, playing a significant role in the development of the coal and salt industries in the region.

== Route and construction ==
The canal began in Carroll, where it split from the Ohio and Erie Canal. From there, it paralleled the Hocking River southeast through Lancaster, Logan, and Nelsonville, terminating near Athens. The route stretched approximately 56 miles (90 km), with over 26 locks constructed to manage elevation changes.

Construction began in the late 1830s and was completed by 1843. Labor was provided primarily by local workers and Irish immigrants, and much of the infrastructure was built using cut stone and timber. Canal boats were drawn by mules or horses along adjacent towpaths.

== Economic role ==
The Hocking Canal served as a crucial transportation route for the coal, salt, pig iron, and agricultural products of the Hocking Valley. Towns like Logan and Nelsonville grew rapidly due to the availability of this waterway, which allowed bulk materials to be shipped northward to Columbus and the Ohio and Erie Canal system.

In addition to goods, the canal supported the movement of people and contributed to the region's development in the mid-19th century. Salt furnaces near Chauncey and coal mining in Nelsonville depended heavily on the canal during its peak years.

== Decline and abandonment ==
The rise of the railroad, particularly the Hocking Valley Railway, began to undercut the canal's relevance by the 1870s. Flooding along the Hocking River caused repeated damage to canal infrastructure, and by the 1880s, repair costs exceeded revenues.

Commercial use declined steadily, and by 1890 the canal was officially abandoned. Some segments were filled in, others were left to erode or overtaken by vegetation. Rail and road development later replaced most of the original route.

== Surviving remnants and legacy ==
Despite its closure, several portions of the Hocking Canal remain visible today.

=== Lock 19 (Sheep Pen Lock) ===
Lock #19, located just west of Nelsonville in eastern Starr Township, is one of the most intact structures. It features a stone-lined chamber and is preserved as part of a roadside park.

- "Hocking Canal Lock No. 19, Near Nelsonville, Ohio". Ohio Memory. Ohio History Connection.

=== Haydenville Lock and Culvert ===
Near Haydenville, a surviving lock and culvert built of cut stone remain visible off the old U.S. Route 33. These features have been documented by the Southeast Ohio History Center for their intact 19th-century masonry.

- "The Hocking Valley Canal". Southeast Ohio History Center.

=== Old Town Creek Aqueduct (Logan) ===
A preserved aqueduct crosses Old Town Creek in Logan. It features a cut-stone arch and submerged 1830s oak timbers still intact beneath the water. The site is maintained as part of Aqueduct Park.

- "Road Trip: Hocking Canal". WOSU News. August 13, 2012.

=== Canal towpaths and trails ===
Sections of the original towpath and canal bed have been incorporated into modern recreational trails, particularly the Old Town Creek Trail in Logan, which runs parallel to the historic alignment for about one mile.

- "Old Town Creek Trail". TrailLink.

In the Nelsonville–Athens corridor, the Hockhocking Adena Bikeway follows portions of the former canal route.

- "Hockhocking Adena Bikeway". City of Athens.

=== Cultural impact ===
Some canal stones were reused in public works projects, including WPA-era bleachers in Nelsonville’s Glouster Memorial Park. Wetlands along the old canal bed now support wildlife such as beavers and herons.

- "The Hocking Valley Canal". Southeast Ohio History Center.

=== Lost infrastructure ===
The last visible traces of the canal in Athens were removed in 1983 to make way for a residential development. Many other sections on private land have disappeared due to erosion, farming, or construction.

== See also ==
- Ohio and Erie Canal
- Hocking River
- List of canals in the United States
