= Bob Addis =

American baseball player (1925–2016)

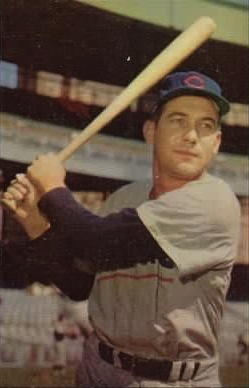
- Addis circa 1953
- Outfielder
- Born: November 6, 1925; Mineral, Ohio, U.S.
- Died: November 15, 2016 (aged 91); Euclid, Ohio, U.S.
- Batted: Left Threw: Right

MLB debut
- September 1, 1950, for the Boston Braves

Last MLB appearance
- June 12, 1953, for the Pittsburgh Pirates

MLB statistics
- Batting average: .281
- Home runs: 2
- Runs batted in: 47
- Stats at Baseball Reference

Teams
- Boston Braves (1950–1951); Chicago Cubs (1952–1953); Pittsburgh Pirates (1953)

Robert Gordon Addis (November 6, 1925 – November 15, 2016) was an American professional baseball player. The outfielder appeared in 208 Major League Baseball games over four seasons (1950–53) for three National League teams. He threw right-handed, batted left-handed, and was listed as 6 feet (1.8 m) tall and 170 pounds (77 kg).

== Career ==
Addis was born in Mineral, Ohio. He graduated from Barberton High School and attended Kent State University. Addis signed with the New York Yankees in 1943, and after one season with the Wellsville Yankees, he took 1944 and 1945 off to serve in World War II as part of the United States Marine Corps. After returning from the war, he spent five more seasons in the minors for the Yankees and Brooklyn Dodgers.

Breaking into the big leagues on September 1, 1950, Addis played his first game for the Boston Braves. He played 16 more games in that season, registering seven hits and seven runs scored. He spent 1951 with the Braves, appearing in 85 games and contributing 55 hits and 23 runs, including his first MLB home run.

Traded to the Chicago Cubs in October 1951, Addis enjoyed a career-best season as a member of the 1952 Cubs. In 93 games and 252 at-bats, he picked up 86 hits, 13 doubles, two triples, 38 runs, and his second big-league homer, knocking in 20 runs batted in. The next season, he played ten games for Chicago, getting two hits and a run batted in, before being included in a massive, ten-player trade—headlined by slugger Ralph Kiner—to the Pittsburgh Pirates. Addis got into four games for the Bucs, appearing in his final MLB contest June 6, 1953, in Pittsburgh. He then played through 1956 at the Triple-A level. In his 208 games in the majors, he notched 150 hits, with 22 doubles, two triples, and two homers. He drove in 47 runs and batted .281 lifetime. Defensively, he recorded a .986 fielding percentage playing at all three outfield positions, committing only 4 errors in 1,028.1 innings in the outfield.
