= Savage-Stewart House =

- U.S. National Register of Historic Places
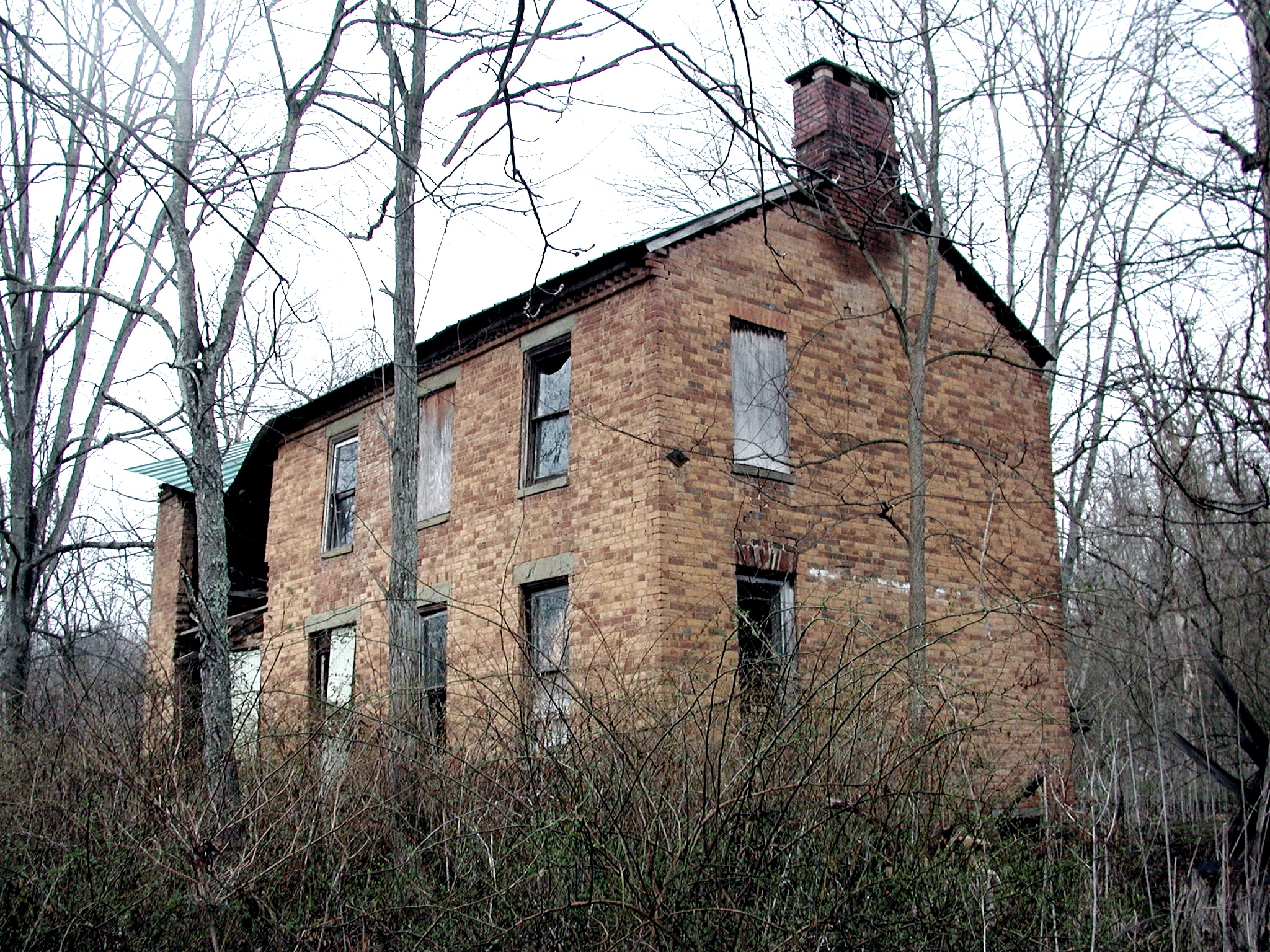
- Side and end of the house

- Location within Ohio Location within the United States
- Location: Southeast of Canaanville, Ohio on U.S. Route 50
- Coordinates: 39°18′43″N 81°58′33″W
- Area: 2 acres (0.81 ha)
- Built: 1804
- NRHP reference No.: 80002939
- Added to NRHP: February 8, 1980

The Savage-Stewart House is one of the oldest buildings in Athens County, Ohio, United States. Located a short distance southeast of Canaanville along U.S. Route 50, it features many architectural details typical of expensive buildings constructed in early Ohio, and it has been named a historic site.

Also known as the "Ackley Farm", the farm includes buildings constructed as early as 1804. The land comprising the farm was given to Abijah Savage, a Continental Army captain from Connecticut, as compensation for his military service in the American Revolution. Throughout the history of the farm, its owners have generally been more prosperous than many of their neighbors, due to the property's location along the rich bottoms of the Hocking River.

Two stories tall and built of brick on foundations of sandstone, the house features elements such as an ornamental balustrade along the staircase in the hallway, a cornice with sawtooth-shaped molding, and fluted columns. Although the house falls into no distinct architectural style, these and related elements are typical of more expensive buildings constructed in Ohio soon after statehood.

In 1980, the house and five outbuildings were listed together on the National Register of Historic Places, qualifying both because of their place in the area's history and because of their distinctive historic architecture. Although the house has largely been abandoned and overgrown, it was deemed historic partially because of the presence of antique farm equipment manufactured before 1930, which at that time was still secure in some of the farm's sheds.
