= Hocking River =

River in southeastern Ohio, United States

Coordinates: 39°11′03″N 81°45′15″W

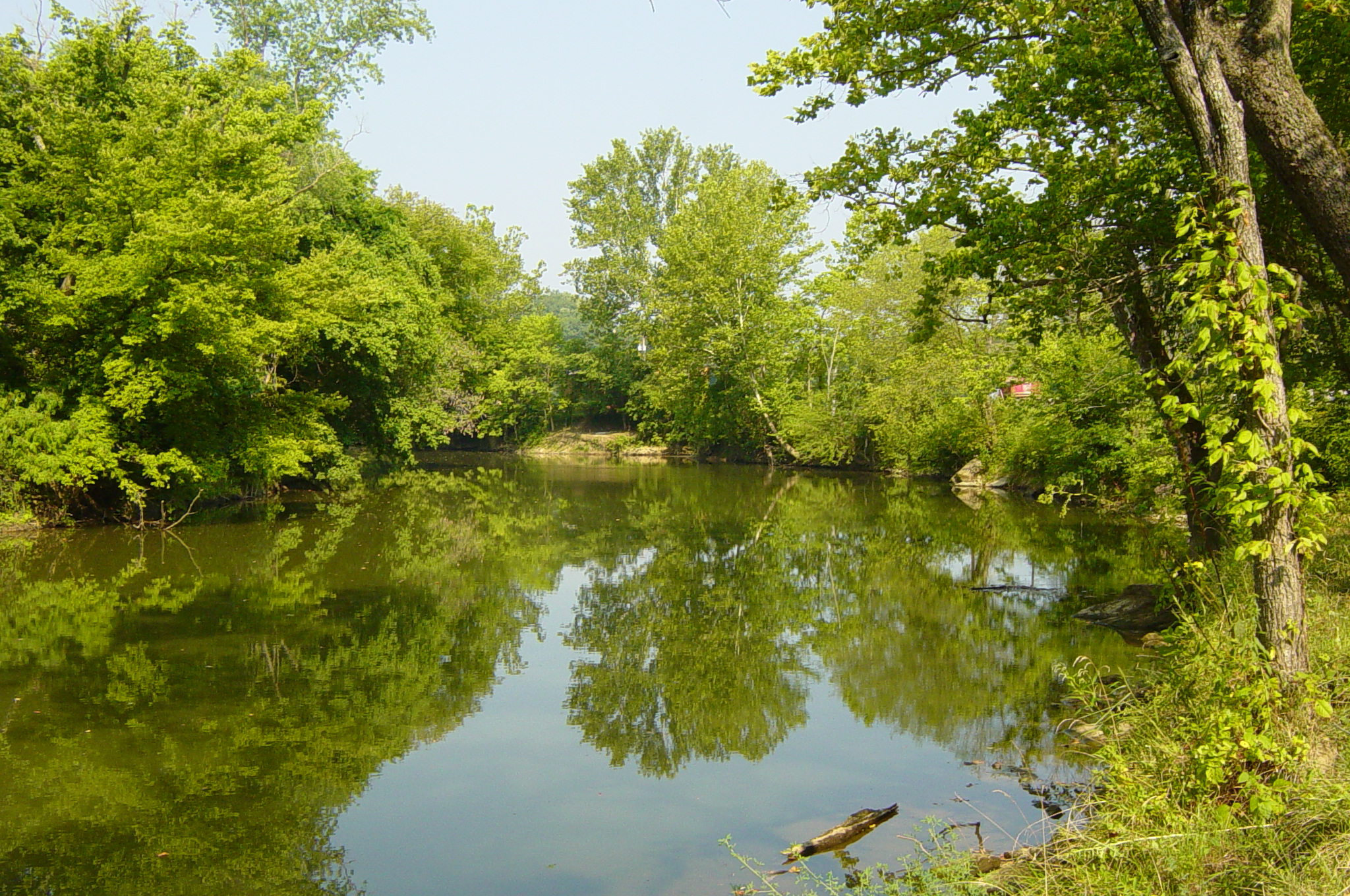
- The Hocking River near Logan

Location
- Country: United States
- State: Ohio
- Counties: Fairfield, Hocking, Athens

Physical characteristics
- Source
  - location: Fairfield County
  - elevation: ~ 1,050 ft (320 m)
- Mouth: Ohio River
  - location: Hockingport
  - elevation: 582 ft (177 m)
- Basin size: 1,197 mi^{2} (3,100 km^{2})
- Discharge
  - location: mouth
  - average: 1,341.74 cu ft/s (37.994 m^{3}/s) (estimate)

Basin features
- Tributaries
  - left: Threemile Creek

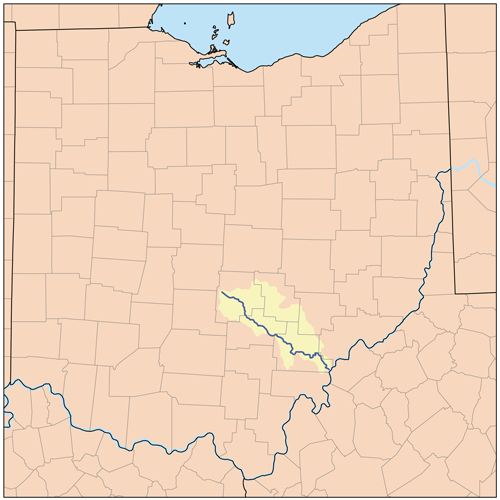
Map of Hocking River

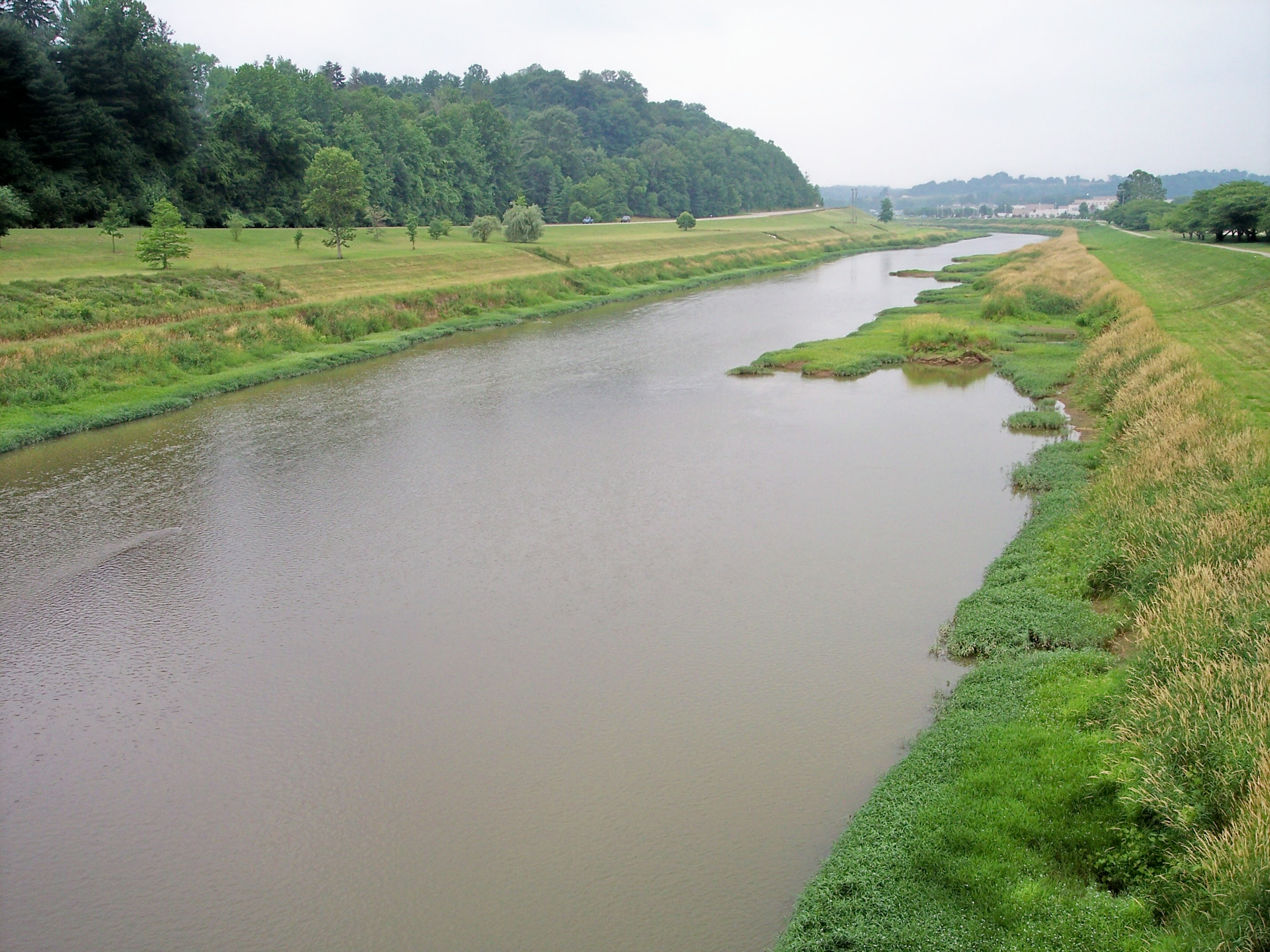
A channelized section of the Hocking River in Athens

The Hocking River (formerly the Hockhocking River) is a 102-mile-long (164 km) right tributary of the Ohio River in southeastern Ohio in the United States.

The Hocking flows mostly on the unglaciated Allegheny Plateau, but its headwaters are in a glaciated region. It rises in Bloom Township in Fairfield County and flows generally southeastwardly through Fairfield, Hocking, and Athens counties, through the Hocking Hills region and past the cities of Lancaster, Logan, Nelsonville, Athens and Coolville. It joins the Ohio River at Hockingport. The Hocking's tributaries also drain parts of Perry, Morgan, and Washington Counties.

Its name originally derives from a Native American name, roughly "Hokhokken" or "Hokhochen", which meant "bottle-shaped" or "gourd-shaped" and referred to the river's headwaters 7 miles north-west of present-day Lancaster, Ohio. The river begins as a small stream, then immediately goes over a waterfall into a wide gorge. When viewed from above, this feature looks like a bottle, which led to its name. The river was known as the Hockhocking River until the late 19th century.

The Hocking Canal once linked Athens to Lancaster and the Ohio and Erie Canal, but was destroyed by flooding and never rebuilt. Due to frequent flooding of Ohio University's campus, the Army Corps of Engineers re-channelized a section of the Hocking River in Athens during the late 1960s and early 1970s. Between Nelsonville and Athens, the Hocking today is roughly paralleled by a rail trail, the Hockhocking Adena Bikeway. The path serves as a major source of recreation for the residents of the area, especially the students of Ohio University and Hocking College.

Major tributaries to the Hocking include (downriver to upriver) Federal Creek, Margaret Creek, Sunday Creek, Monday Creek, Scott Creek, Oldtown Creek, Clear Creek, Rush Creek, Pleasant Run, Baldwin Run, and Hunters Run. Many of these tributaries are affected by acid mine drainage.

== Recreation ==
Canoeing, kayaking, rafting, and tubing are very popular activities on the Hocking River. Hocking Hills Adventures and Hocking Hills Canoe Livery each operate trips suitable for all skill levels on the mid and upper sections of the river.

The mid and upper portions of the Hocking River serve as an above-average smallmouth bass fishery. Typical species of midwestern warm-water streams are generally found throughout the river.

The Hocking River Water Trail is now under development. There are currently river access points for fishing and for canoes and kayaks at Logan, Ohio, at Hocking College at Nelsonville, Ohio, on Hamley Run Road northwest of The Plains, Ohio, at West State Street Park in Athens, Ohio, at County Road 24A near Canaanville, Ohio, and at the Army Corps of Engineers' Belleville Locks and Dam recreational access point on Frost Road near Coolville, Ohio.

It is spanned by the Rock Mill Covered Bridge.

== Nonprofit organizations ==
Two organizations particularly concerned with preserving the environment of the river and its adjacent lands, and with providing recreational access to the river, are: the Hocking River Commission, based in Athens County, Ohio, and the Friends of the Hocking River, based in Hocking County, Ohio. Friends of the Hocking River in conjunction with Hocking Hills Adventures sponsor an annual river cleanup. The event is usually held on the second Saturday in June and it concludes with a BBQ and music.

== Variant names ==
The Shawnee language name is Wi'thakakkwathiipi.

According to the Geographic Names Information System, the Hocking River has also been known as:

- Big Hock-hocking River
- Great Hock-hocking River
- Hock-Hocking River
- Hockhocken River
- Hockhocking River
- Hocking Hocking River
- Hokhoking River
- Big Hockhocking River
- Big Hocking River
- Great Hockhocking River
- Hakhakkien River
- Hockhoking River

The form "Hockhocking" was generally used for the first century of Ohio's statehood, as reflected on old maps, while the shorter "Hocking" River form has been used for about the past century.

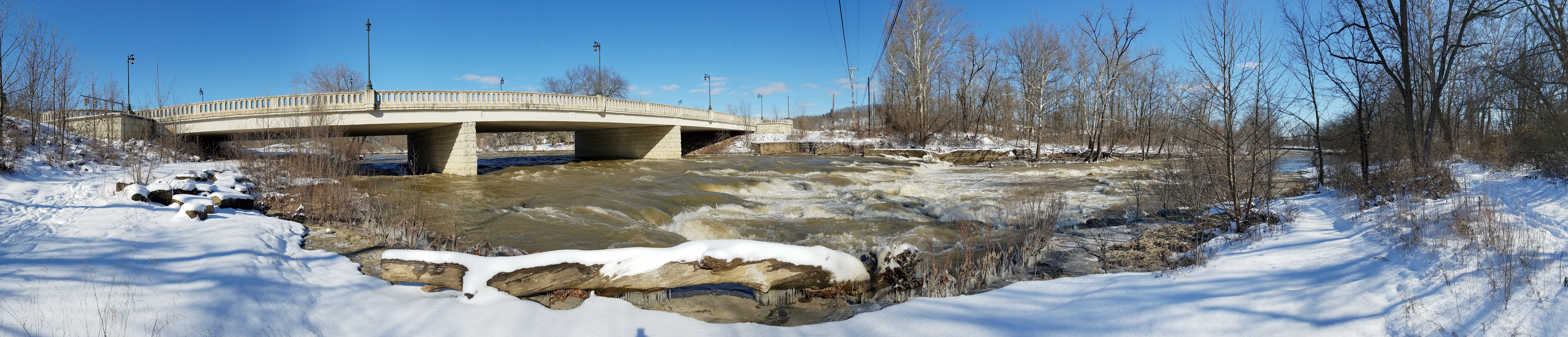
Falls Mill Bridge over Hocking River in Logan

== Flooding ==
Flooding on the Hocking used to be a yearly occurrence for the residents of Athens, Ohio. The floods determined many aspects of the residents' lives, for example where to build a house. Most of the houses in Athens are built up on the hills, or the higher ground. It was not until the university needed to expand, due to an influx of students during the 1950s that anything was even built into the flood plain. Some mentionable floods included the 1907 flood, in which seven people died, and about twenty houses were swept away. Another notable flood took place in 1968 which was labeled "The worst flood in fifty five years". The 1968 flood is also of interest due to the fact that the re-routing of the Hocking River project began in 1969. The re-routing of the Hocking was undertaken by the US Army Corps of Engineers, and was paid for by the university. The project was completed by 1971 and reverted five miles of the river along the West Green.

=== Flood of 1907 ===
This flood took place on March 14, 1907, and caused extensive damage throughout Athens and SE Ohio. According to the Athens Journal, seven people died during the flood and the rescue attempts which followed. The flood uprooted about twenty houses, as well as drowned countless heads of horse and cattle. Residents who owned rowboats spent the days after the flood rescuing as many people as possible from their flooded houses; many people were saved, but rescuers were among the seven people who died. Thousands of people were forced to leave their homes, and many people were arrested for looting in the days after the flood. Telegraph lines were ripped down due to the flood, leaving Athens residents with no way of communicating with the outside world in the days after the flood. The railroad, waterworks plant, and electric plant were flooded, leaving Athens residents without water or electricity.

=== Flood of 1968 ===
The Flood of 1968 caused more severe damage. Four inches of rain fell in twenty-four hours, causing the river to crest at twenty-five feet, eight feet above flood level. Students actually helped the National Guardsmen in rescue efforts and sandbagging in an attempt to control the flooding. The flood made national news, worrying parents and relatives who were tuning in. Students were also seen diving off the balcony in front of Brown Hall, and out dorm windows on the West Green. It was reportedly the worst flood in fifty-five years, and caused $8.9 million in damage to Athens county, and $750,000 to Ohio Universities campus.

=== Re-routing project ===
A year after the 1968 flood the re-routing project began. The project was carried out by the Army Corps of Engineers, and was funded by Ohio University. The university needed to expand its campus into the flood plain without having to pay annual damages, and without putting students at risk. So the re-routing project, which had been proposed years earlier, became one of the only viable solutions for the university's dilemma. It has been speculated that the new river channel has three times the carrying capacity of the old one, and should reduce chances of flooding by 86%, preventing an estimated $800,000 annual flood loss. The project began on April 12, 1969. It was estimated to cost $11 million, and was to re-route a five-mile strip of river that ran along the West Green. Also, a four-laned bridge was constructed along Richland Ave, which can still be seen today. The project was completed by 1971, and OU reportedly paid $375,000 per year for twenty-two years. The project had a lasting effect on the campus of OU; the pre-1969 Hocking would have run directly through the bottom floor of the new Baker Center. US Army Corps has estimated that since the project was completed, $48 million in flood damage has been averted since completion. The project was put to the test in May 1990 when heavy rains caused the river to crest at twenty- three feet in Athens. President Bush declared Athens and three other counties "Disaster Areas"; the flood caused $4 million in damage to SE Ohio, but physical plant director Chuck Culp estimated that rerouting the river saved OU more than $500,000 in flood damage. The most visible change to Athens due to the rerouting project was the building of Baker Center. Baker Center is built right in the original flood plain of the Hocking river; the second floor of Baker would actually be stream level.

== Namesakes ==
The Hocking Valley Railway was formed in 1870. Today, the Hocking Valley Scenic Railway still runs as a tourist attraction.

Hocking County, Ohio is named after the river, as are the Hocking Hills, which include Hocking State Forest and Hocking Hills State Park.

The Hocking Canal existed from 1838 to 1890.

Hocking College is a technical college located at Nelsonville, Ohio.

The Hocking Glass Company was formed in 1905, and merged to become Anchor Hocking by 1937.

General Hocking Brick Company, Hocking Iron Company, Hocking Valley Products Company and Hocking Valley Clay Company were all former manufacturers in the area.

The Hocking River's name was the inspiration for the call letters of Lancaster's Country music radio station WHOK-FM (now WXMG).

== See also ==
- Appalachian Ohio
- List of rivers of Ohio
- Little Hocking River
