= 2000 in the environment =

This is a list of notable events relating to the environment in 2000. They relate to environmental law, conservation, environmentalism and environmental issues.

== Events ==
- Large scale phosphate mining in Nauru ends leaving an environmental disaster on the small island nation.
- The clean up of contaminated land due to the British nuclear tests at Maralinga in Australia is completed.
- The Scimitar oryx is assessed as being extinct in the wild.
- The Porter School of Environmental Studies is founded.

=== January ===
- The Baia Mare cyanide spill was a leak of cyanide near Baia Mare, Romania, into the Someş River by the gold mining company Aurul, a joint-venture of the Australian company Esmeralda Exploration and the Romanian government. The polluted waters eventually reached the Tisza and then the Danube, killing large numbers of fish in Hungary and Yugoslavia. The spill has been called the worst environmental disaster in Europe since the Chernobyl disaster.
- A leaking underwater pipeline released 1,300,000 litres (340,000 US gal) of oil into Guanabara Bay, Brazil, destroying large swaths of the mangrove forests.
- Tetraethyllead, an anti-knock additive for motor fuels, is banned from sale in the European Union. The problematic environmental and health effects are well documented but as of 2003 it remains on sale in some countries.

=== June ===
- US president Bill Clinton signs the Plant Protection Act.

=== October ===
- The Martin County Sludge Spill occurred when an estimated 306,000,000 US gallons (1.16×10^{9} L; 255,000,000 imp gal) coal sludge broke into an abandoned underground mine below the impoundment in Martin County, Kentucky in the United States.

=== November ===
- David Brower, an American environmental activist and founder of numerous environmental organisations, dies at the age of 88.
- Voters approve the creation of the Clean Ohio Fund.

=== December ===
- US president Bill Clinton signs the Shark Finning Prohibition Act.

== See also ==
- Human impact on the environment
- List of years in the environment
