= Canaanville, Ohio =

Unincorporated community in Ohio, U.S.

Canaanville (/ˈkeɪnənvɪl/ KAY-nən-vil) is an unincorporated community in Canaan Township, Athens County, Ohio, United States. It has an elevation of 630 feet (190 m) and is located at 39°19′16″N 81°59′30″W.

According to the Centennial Atlas of Athens County (1905), the community originally called Canaanville was slightly to the west, west of where Ohio State Route 690 now intersects with US Route 50. There still is an historic house at that location, at the intersection of McAfee Road with the connector road to US-50 at County Road 24A. The community now called Canaanville was then called Detroit. Both communities were originally on the railroad: at first, the Marietta and Cincinnati Railroad, which was later the B&O Railroad. Today, that line has been long since abandoned and obliterated.

One of the oldest houses in Athens County lies on the east side of Canaanville, known as the Savage-Stewart House. For a period of some years, there was a restaurant and bakery on the north side of Canaanville, known as the Big Chimney Bakery because of the old chimney of a mining facility.

When US Route 50 was upgraded to a four-lane divided highway, Canaanville was cut in two lengthwise. Today, there are roads fronting on both sides of the highway, each with a row of houses on the side away from the highway.
