= Porter School of Environmental Studies =

Graduate school in Israel

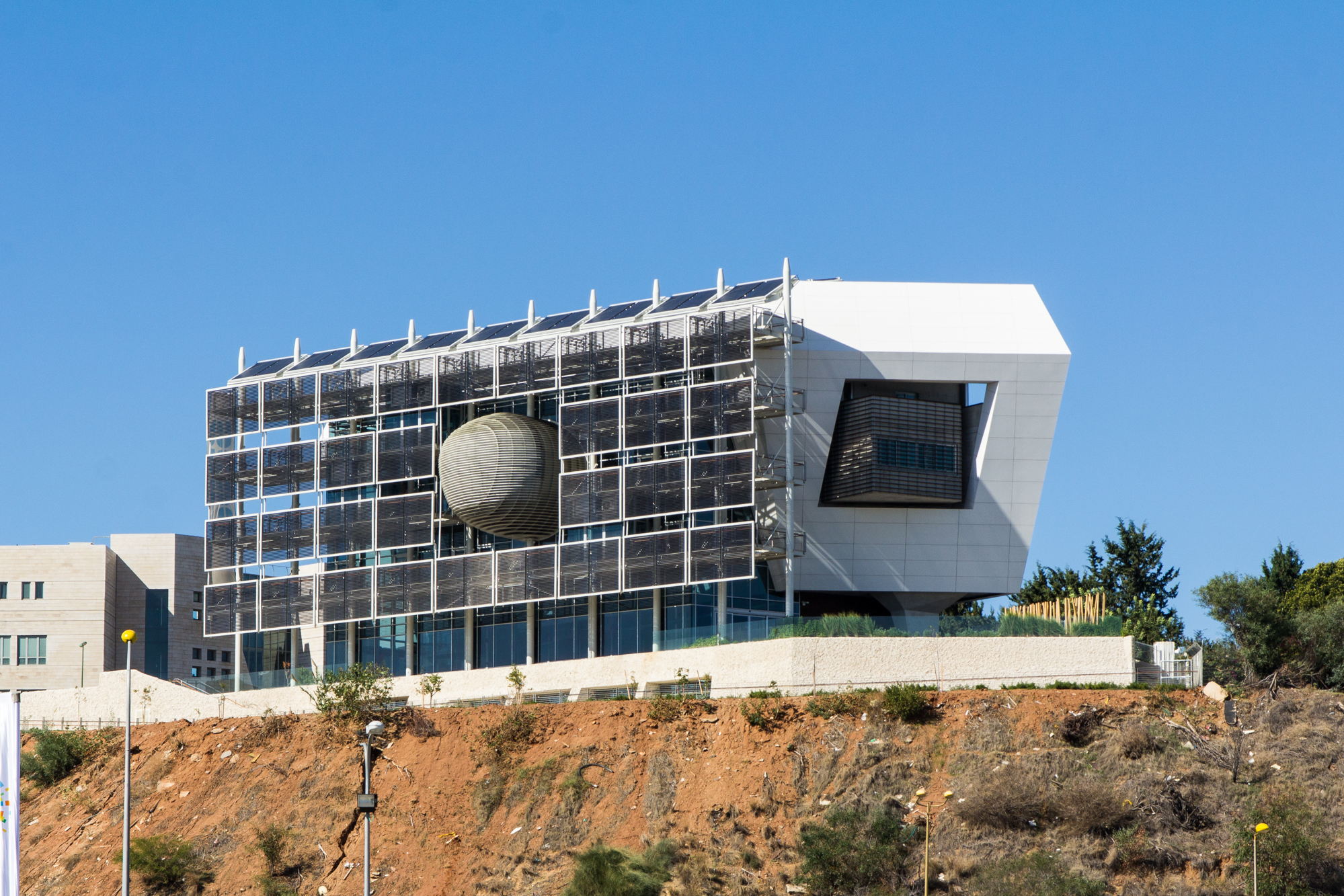
The Porter School of Environmental Studies

The Porter School of Environment and Earth Sciences (PSEES) is a graduate school within the Faculty of Exact Sciences, Tel Aviv University. It is Israel’s first graduate school to focus on research, teaching and the sharing of environmental knowledge, and one of the few worldwide to take a multidisciplinary and interdisciplinary approach to the study of environmental issues.

Because of Israel's unique geographic and geopolitical status in the Middle East, the school focuses on gaining a greater understanding on how environmental issues affect Israel and its neighbors.

== Founded ==
The Porter School of Environment Studies was established in 2000 by Dame Shirley Porter and her late husband Sir Leslie Porter, then Chancellor of Tel Aviv University, through the Porter Foundation.

== PSES building ==
Back in 2001, Dame Shirley Porter envisioned the construction of an energy efficient ecobuilding, housing conferences, lectures and research all under one roof.

Sustainability was a vital factor in the planning of the new building, with the new building implementing many environmental technologies. These technologies include photovoltaic power and solar collectors to produce energy, waste water recycling, natural ventilation, bioclimatic design and the use of recycled and environmentally friendly building materials.

The Porter School of Environment and Earth Sciences was designed to be the first building in Israel to achieve LEED Platinum status, the highest standard of the US Green Building Council. In addition it was also planned to be the first building in Israel to be awarded Diamond level certification according to Israel's Green Building Standard (IS 52810).

After an inauguration ceremony on 21 May 2014, The Porter School of Environment and Earth Sciences relocated to its present premises in the ecobuilding.

== Academic subjects ==
The Porter School of Environment and Earth Sciences teaches a number of Master’s Programs, a PhD program and new undergraduate programs; as well as an international MA program in Environmental Studies.

The core academic studies at The Porter School of Environment and Earth Sciences have been designed to provide students with a multidisciplinary understanding into environmental issues and how they affect Israel and the surrounding region, with emphasis on Israel's unique geographic and geopolitical position. Courses focus on issues facing the Middle East including the importance of water to the region, sustainability and how climate change is affecting the entire region.

== Regional cooperation ==
The Porter School of Environment and Earth Sciences regards regional cooperation as a necessity to maintaining environmental sustainability and in helping to prevent the spread of infectious disease, limiting the damaging effects of climate change and protecting the region's scarce water supplies. Many of the programs and projects run by the school include international cooperation.

== See also ==
- 2000 in the environment
