= Threemile Creek (Hocking River tributary) =

Stream in Hocking County, Ohio, U.S.

Coordinates: 39°30′21″N 82°21′47″W

Threemile Creek is a stream in Hocking County, Ohio. It is a tributary of the Hocking River.

Threemile Creek was so named for its length, approximately three miles (4.8 km) long. Its mouth into the Hocking River forms a small delta entering the Hocking both upstream and downstream opposite the mouth of Fivemile Creek.

== See also ==
- List of rivers of Ohio
