= Marietta and Cincinnati Railroad =

Former railroad in Ohio, United States

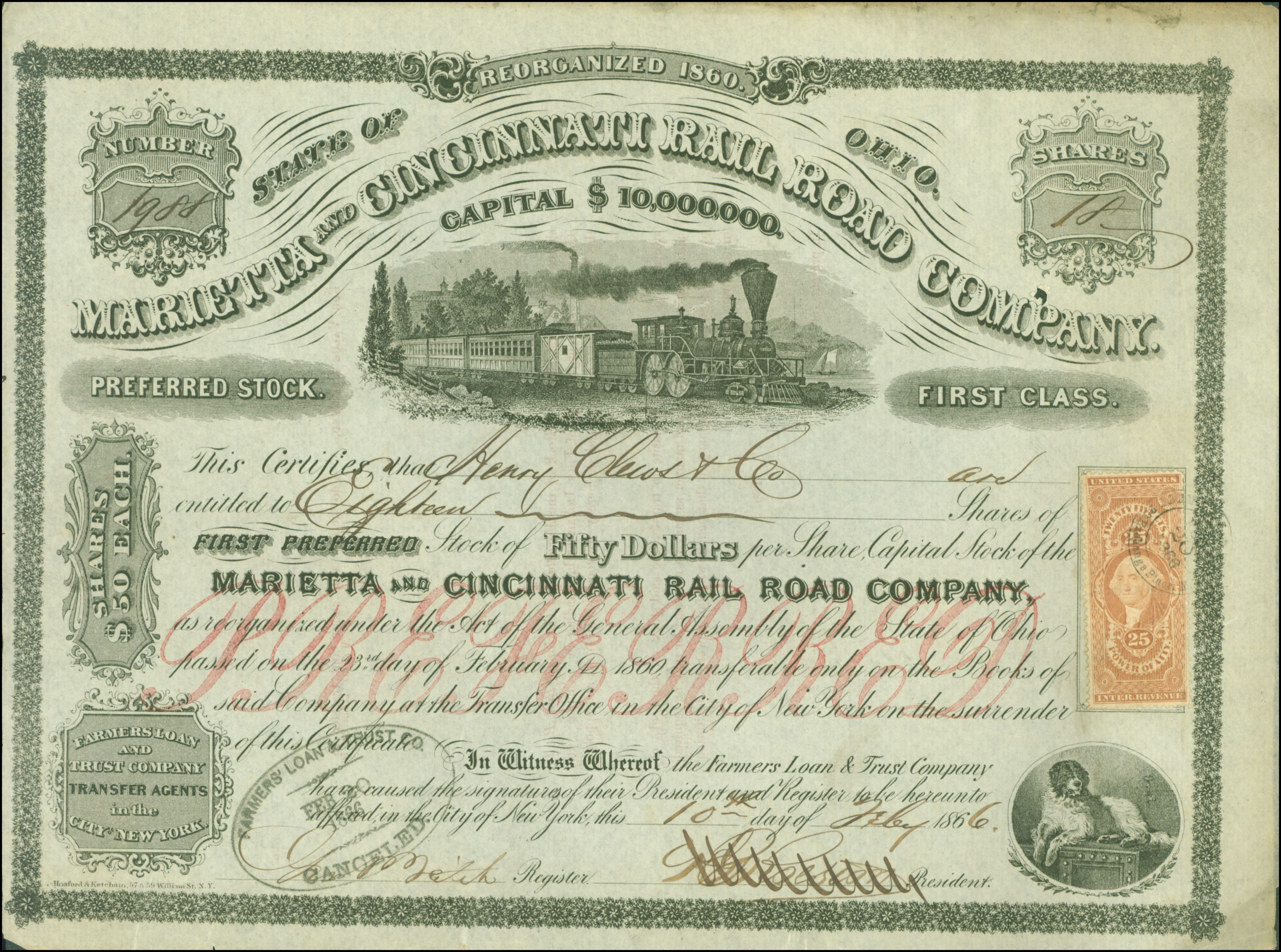
Share of the Marietta and Cincinnati Rail Road Company, issued 10. July 1866

The Marietta and Cincinnati (M&C) was one of five important east-west railroads of southern Ohio; it was later absorbed by the Baltimore and Ohio Railroad (B&O). Its original route ran from Marietta through Vincent, Athens, Hamden, Chillicothe, Greenfield, Blanchester, and Loveland. It had two main branches: Blanchester to Hillsboro, which was originally part of the Hillsboro and Cincinnati Railroad; and Hamden to Portsmouth, Ohio, originally part of the Scioto and Hocking Valley Railroad.

== History ==
The M&C was founded as the Belpre and Cincinnati Railroad (B&C) in 1845 The destination of the B&C was changed from Belpre to Marietta, Ohio, and in 1851 the name of the railroad was changed to The Marietta and Cincinnati Railroad. The M&C reached Loveland, Ohio by 1857. The company entered bankruptcy in 1858, from which it emerged in 1860. The first through-train from Cincinnati, using the tracks of The Little Miami Railroad to reach Loveland, ran on April 9, 1857.

An extension of the right-of-way from Marietta upriver to Bellaire, Ohio, to enable a connection across the Ohio River with the Baltimore and Ohio Railroad at Wheeling, Virginia, had been largely graded with stone culverts constructed by the 1858 bankruptcy. Construction stopped. The Pennsylvania Railroad (PRR) later purchased the right-of-way between Bellaire and Marietta.

The Northwestern Virginia Railroad, financed and controlled by the B&O, was built from a junction with the B&O mainline at Grafton, Virginia to Parkersburg, Virginia and opened May 1, 1857. The M&C operated a ferry for the 14 miles downriver from Marietta to Parkersburg, so that travelers and freight could be transferred between the systems.

With help from the B&O and the Baltimore City Council, the Union Railroad was built from Scott's Landing (Moore's Junction), three miles south of Marietta on the Ohio River, to Belpre in 1860. It was operated by the M&C. This section of track is still in operation (2012) with unit coal trains providing most of the traffic.

Between 1864 and 1866, the M&C built its own line from Loveland through Madeira, Madisonville, Norwood, and Spring Grove to a connection with The Cincinnati, Hamilton and Dayton Railroad at Winton Place. This line opened on February 18, 1866

The Cincinnati and Baltimore Railway was chartered in 1868 and was built six miles down the east bank of Mill Creek from Spring Grove to downtown Cincinnati. This line was opened on June 1, 1872 and was "transferred on that day, under a contract for a perpetual lease" to the M&C.

The Baltimore Short Line Railway was chartered in 1870 to build from Warren's Station (east of Athens) 30 miles to Belpre. It opened on November 15, 1874. It was built to afford lower operating and maintenance costs as well as a shorter route to Belpre. This line followed the Hocking River through Canaanville, Guysville and Stewart. It went through Coolville Station, Torch and Belpre. This became the mainline route of the M&C and later the B&O.

In December 1876, service on the "Old Line" from Warren's Station to a connection with the old Union Railroad at Scott's Landing was discontinued. It duplicated the Baltimore Short Line and was considered dangerous, steep and difficult to maintain, as it had many trestles and tunnels.

The Marietta & Cincinnati Railroad became the Cincinnati, Washington and Baltimore Railroad on February 16, 1883. On December 20, 1889 the C.W.&B. became The Baltimore and Ohio Southwestern Railroad.

The Marietta Mineral Railway was incorporated in February 1882 to restore operations on the

"old line between Scott's Landing (Moore's Junction) and Big Run, northeast of Warren's. In October of 1884 trains were put into operation between Flemming Station and Marietta. This constituted 7 miles of the old line to Moore's Junction and three miles of the old Union line to Marietta. The remaining 15 miles to Big Run was put into operation in June 1885."

This section was known for its many accidents. The name was changed to the Marietta, Columbus and Cleveland Railroad (MC&C) in December 1900 and operated to about 1917. The east end operated as the Marietta and Vincent Railroad Company until abandoned in 1924.

The rest of the line from Canaanville westward was acquired and operated for many years by B&O Railroad. The section from eastern Vinton County to Belpre was abandoned in the 1980s and the right-of-way sold off. Today, the portion from Mineral, Ohio to the end of the now-operating line south of Zaleski, Ohio is the Moonville Rail-Trail.

William P. Cutler was an important figure in the development of the M&C. He also was a backer of the Union Railroad and the Marietta Mineral, among other local railroads. Cutler served as General Manager and as President of the M&C for many years.
