= Moonville Rail-Trail =

Rail-trail in Ohio, U.S.

- Length: 10 miles (16 km)
- Location: Vinton and Athens County, Ohio
- Established: 2021
- Trailheads: Zaleski, Ohio • Mineral, Ohio
- Use: Hiking, horse riding, and cycling
- Elevation gain/loss: 7 feet (2.1 m) loss
- Highest point: 731 feet (223 m)
- Lowest point: 691 feet (211 m)
- Grade: 0%
- Difficulty: Hard
- Season: Year round
- Sights: Zaleski State Forest; Lake Hope State Park
- Surface: Gravel/dirt
- Maintained by: Moonville Rail-Trail Association
- Website: vintoncounty.com/moonville-rail-trail-association/

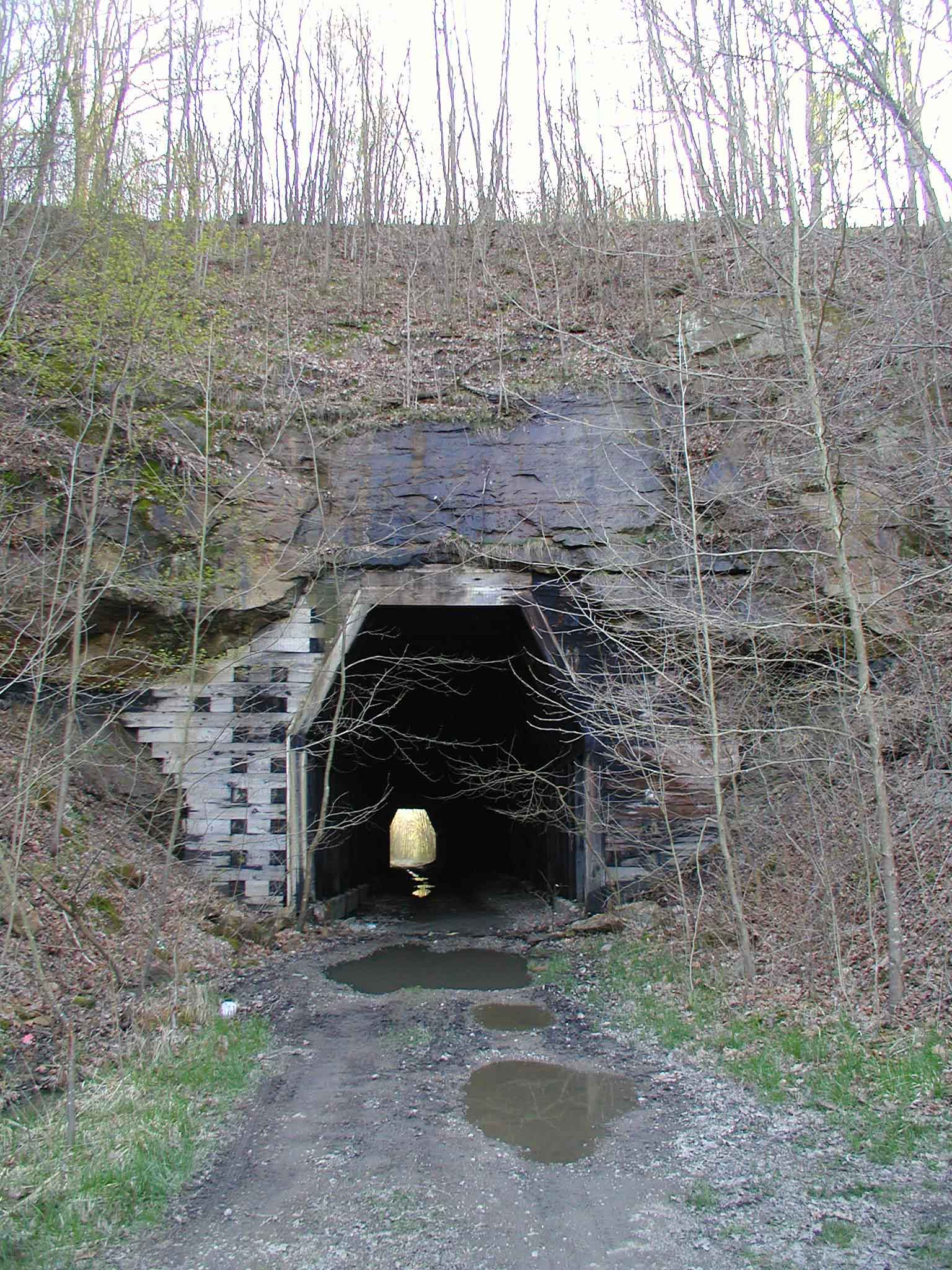
King Switch Tunnel

The Moonville Rail-Trail is a ten-mile (16 kilometer) rail-trail in southeast Ohio, located in Vinton and Athens Counties. It is largely embedded in the Zaleski State Forest and passes close to Lake Hope State Park. The trail is named after the Moonville Tunnel through which it passes.

The trail is built on the grade of a railroad originally built as part of the Marietta and Cincinnati Railroad, which ran between its namesake cities. The M&C was acquired by the Baltimore and Ohio Railroad becoming its Southwestern Division. The B&O was merged into the Chessie System Railroads, which was then merged into CSX Transportation. CSX abandoned parts and sold parts of the old M&C line in stages during the late 1980s. Track was removed from the abandoned sections.

The section of the railroad grade (with track removed) from the Red Diamond Powder Plant on the west end (between McArthur and Zaleski) to Mineral on the east end was acquired by the respective county governments through Clean Ohio Conservation Fund grants. The underlying property is owned by the Athens County Commissioners in Athens County, and by the Vinton County Commissioners in Vinton County. The rail trail runs from Zaleski to Mineral. The rail remains intact from the Diamond Powder Plant westward nearly to Chillicothe. The track from Mineral eastward is abandoned through Athens and to Belpre.

This rail-trail is open to hikers, horse riders, and bicyclists. It has a gravel/dirt surface and has many stream crossings where the railroad bridges were removed during the dismantling of the track. Work to restore the many bridges in order to make the entire stretch passable is underway. The trail features two tunnels: the Moonville Tunnel, a masonry tunnel in Vinton County that is reputed to be haunted, and the King Switch Tunnel, a timber tunnel in Athens County.

The governing organization of the trail, Moonville Rail-Trail, Inc., hopes to eventually extend the trail eastward to New Marshfield then to Athens to join with the Hockhocking Adena Bikeway.

== Location ==
- West terminus at Zaleski: 39°17′10″N 82°23′24″W
- East terminus at Mineral: 39°19′29″N 82°15′54″W
