= Athens-Belpre Rail-Trail =

Rail trail in Ohio, United States

Coordinates: 39°14′30.3″N 81°44′56.2″W

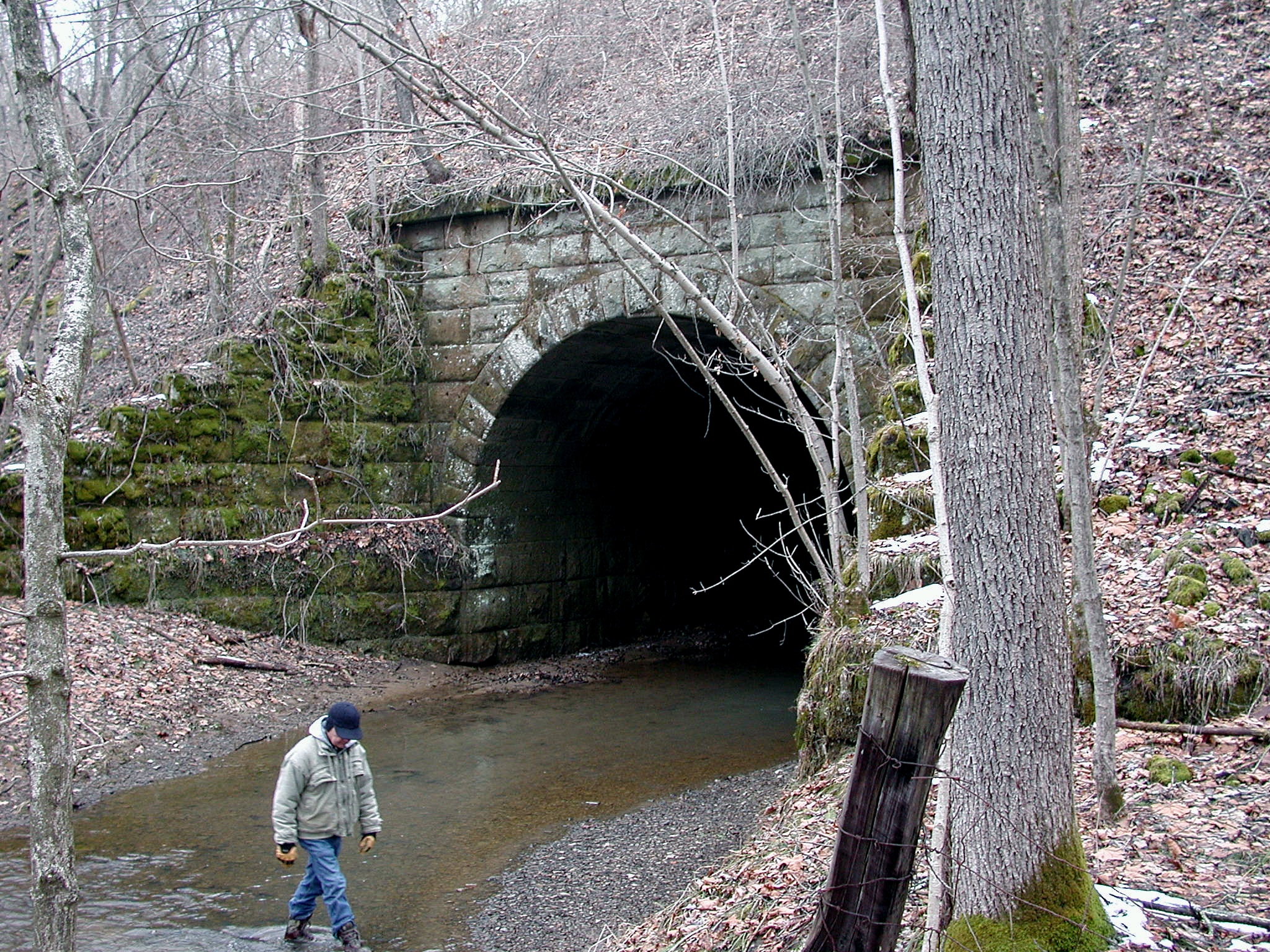
- An historic stone stream culvert under a causeway created over a century ago for the former B&O Railroad, in Troy Township, Athens County, Ohio, USA.
- Location: Athens County, Ohio & Washington County, Ohio, Ohio, United States
- Established: 2010
- Website: Athens-Belpre Rail-Trail

The Athens-Belpre Rail-Trail is a new trailway now being developed in southeast Ohio. It will link Athens, Ohio, in Athens County, with Belpre, Ohio, in Washington County. It will link on the west with the Hockhocking Adena Bikeway. There are hopes of eventually connecting with the North Bend Rail Trail in West Virginia. It will largely use the former B&O Railroad line from Belpre to Athens, which began as the B&O Short Line, and which became part of the B&O main line to St. Louis, Missouri.

The eastern spadefoot toad, Scaphiopus holbrookii, is known to inhabit one section of the right-of-way.

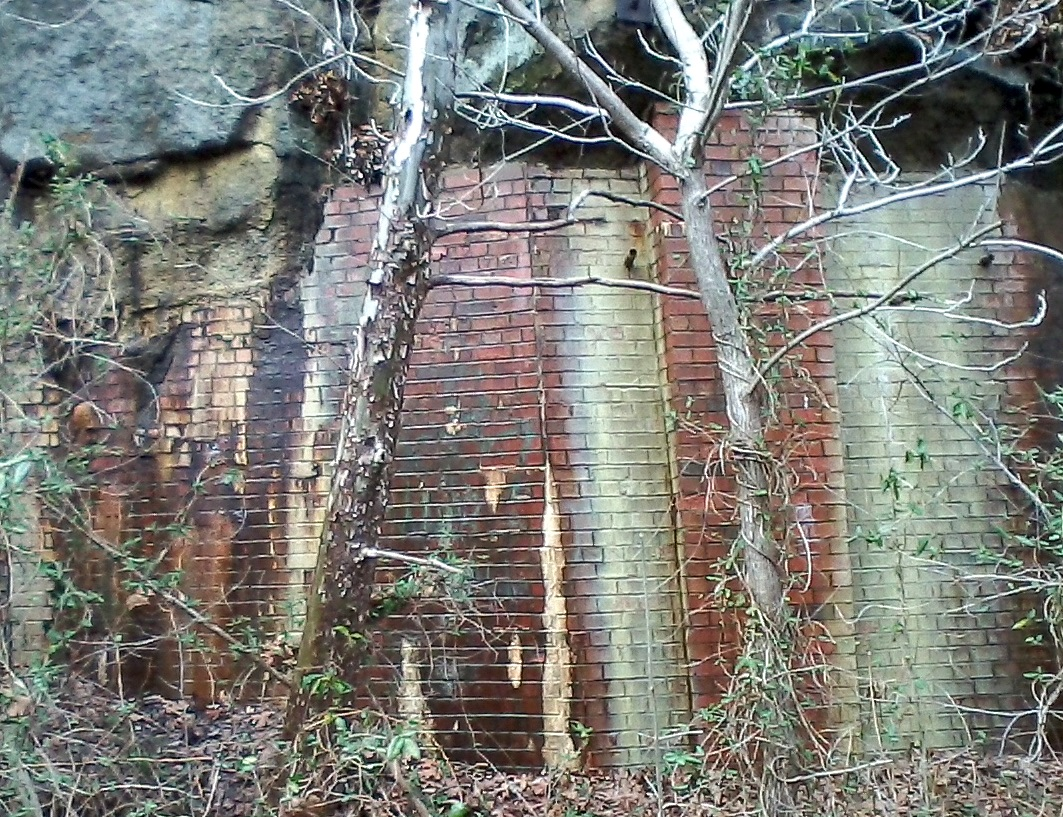
A supporting wall built in the Skunk Run valley to shore up a sandstone bluff, along the former B&O Railroad, in Troy Township, Athens County, Ohio, USA.

== See also ==
- List of rail trails
- Dawkins Line Rail Trail
- Pine Mountain State Scenic Trail
- Little Miami Scenic Trail
