= Oldtown Creek =

Stream in Tuscarawas County, Ohio

Coordinates: 40°27′34″N 81°25′31″W

Oldtown Creek is a stream located entirely within Tuscarawas County, Ohio.

Oldtown Creek most likely was so named for the fact it flows near the Schoenbrunn Village, one of the oldest settlements in Ohio.

== See also ==
- List of rivers of Ohio
