= Mineral, Ohio =

Unincorporated community in Ohio, U.S.

Coordinates: 39°19′26″N 82°15′53″W

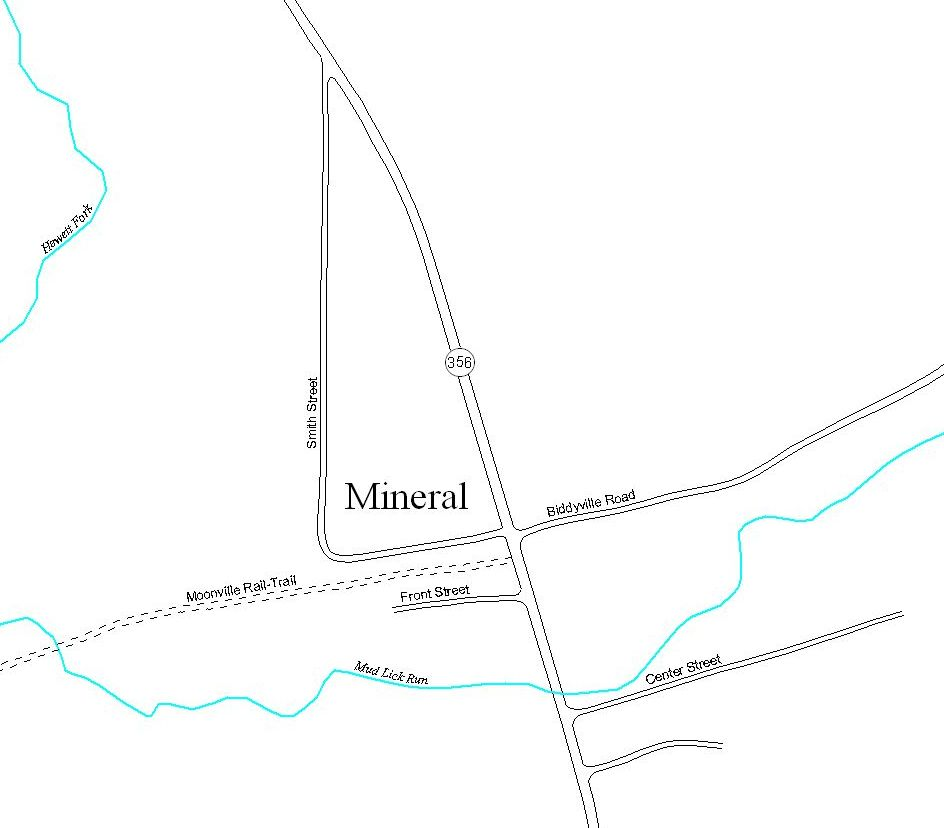
Map of Mineral, Ohio

Mineral is an unincorporated community in Athens County, Ohio, United States. Centered on State Route 356, it was established as a coal mining community. It is located on Mud Lick Run, which flows into nearby Hewitt Fork, a tributary of Raccoon Creek. The B&O Railroad once ran through the community, but was abandoned in the 1980s. In recent years, the portion of the old railroad grade going west from the community has become the Moonville Rail-Trail. The King Switch Tunnel on the grade is close to the community. The next larger community is New Marshfield, also unincorporated, to the east in the same township.
