= Strouds Run State Park =

Park in Ohio, USA

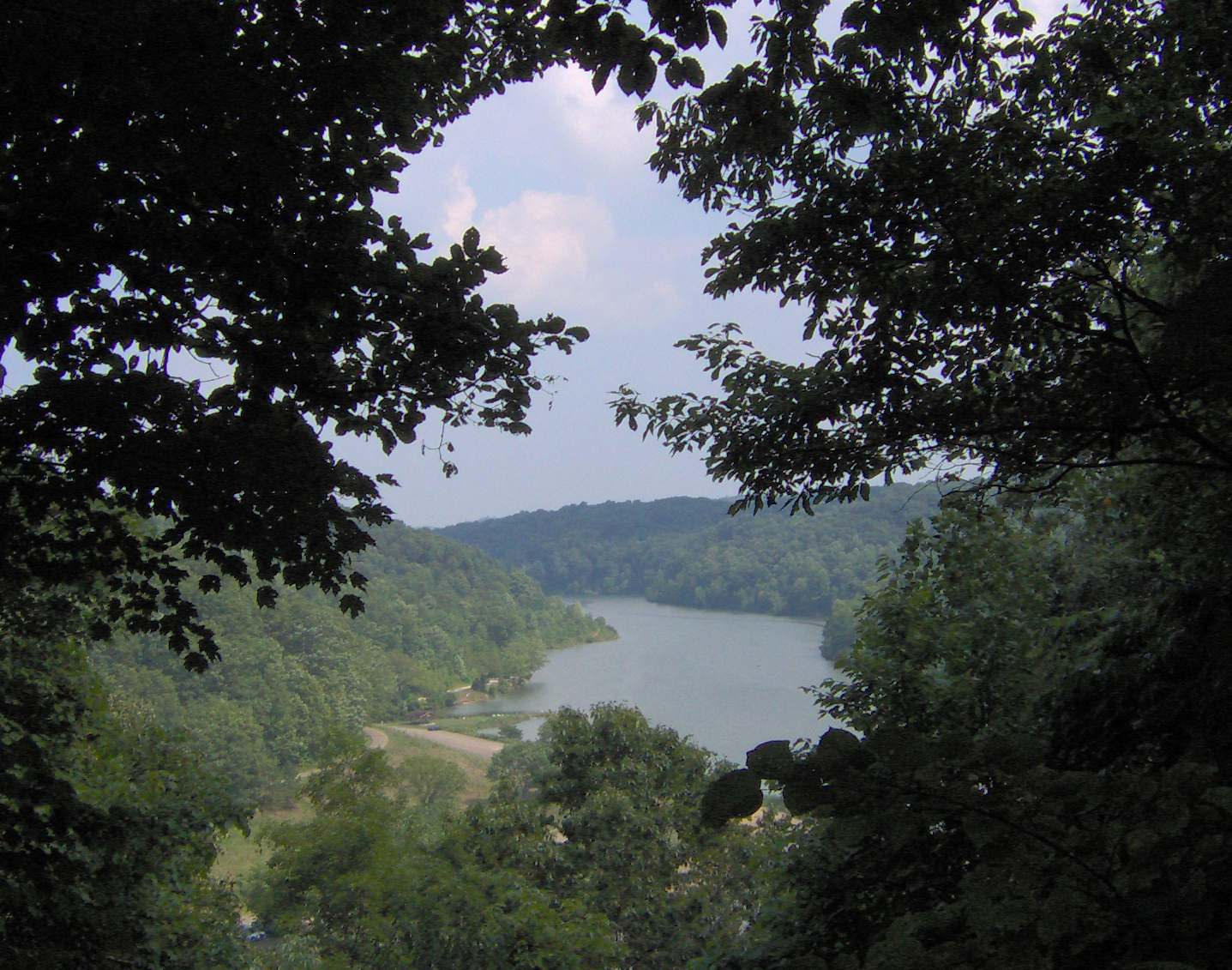
- Dow Lake from vista point

- Location within Ohio Location within the United States
- Location: Athens County, Ohio, United States
- Coordinates: 39°20′57″N 82°01′56″W
- Area: Land: 2,606 acres (1,055 ha); Water: 161 acres (65 ha)
- Elevation: 705 feet (215 m)
- Established: 1953
- Administrator: Ohio Department of Natural Resources
- Website: Strouds Run State Park

Strouds Run State Park is a public recreation area abutting the city of Athens in Athens County, Ohio, in the United States. The state park is located primarily in Canaan Township, with a small part in Ames Township. Park boundaries coincide with Athens city limits in several places. The park comprises 2,606 acres (1,055 ha), and includes Dow Lake, a 161-acre (65 ha) artificial lake. The park is named after William Stroud who was a share-holder in the Ohio Company of Associates.

== History ==
The original land for the park was purchased for the Athens State Forest in the 1940s and 1950s. In the late 1950s, construction was started on the Dow Lake Dam, which was completed in 1960, at which point the land became Strouds Run State Park in its entirety.

A large area on the west side of the park was formerly land of the Gillett family (Samuel and Charlotte Beach Gillett and their descendants). The family owned well over a thousand acres at one time. The old farmstead seen on the Trace Trail and the "Pioneer Cemetery" are both remnant from the Gillett occupancy of the land. Two of the adjacent nature preserves, both owned by the Athens Conservancy (Blair Preserve and Tucker Run Preserve) are also both on former Gillett family land.

One of the most recently purchased areas of the park was acquired in 1953 from the Crumley family, heirs to Dr. John Jackson Crumley, who purchased the land almost a century ago as an experimental tree farm. Dr. Crumley was a classical scholar who also was one of Ohio's early state foresters, who managed the purchase of the original land for Zaleski State Forest and Hocking State Forest, and who wrote one of the earliest practical handbooks on forestry.

A large part of the upper east side of the part was owned by the Cone family, last owned by Charles Cone and Lucille Gillett Cone (a descendant of Samuel Gillett above.) Adjacent to the Cone farm was a large, one-room school house that was dismantled when the lake was built. Some of the materials from the school house were then used to construct the Strouds Run Community Church just up the road from the park, as well as a new barn for Charles Cone who lost his previous one to the park's construction. The church was eventually converted into a private residence, and was subsequently completely destroyed in a fire a few years later.

The area from the old school house, up past where the church was constructed and beyond was briefly known as Marchmont. From 1893 to 1901, there was an inn and post office for the Marchmont area that was located at the base of what was then known as Tucker Hill. This was on the same portion of land that remained in the Cone family after the park's construction, and currently remains with descendants of Charles Cone.

In addition to Gillett and Cone, some other notable family names affected by the park's construction were Cain, Finsterwald, Weiss, and Stalder. Many of those families came to this country with Baron deSteiguer. The Baron purchased the lands from the heirs of John Paul Jones as most of the area land was once owned by the Revolutionary War admiral.

== Natural history ==
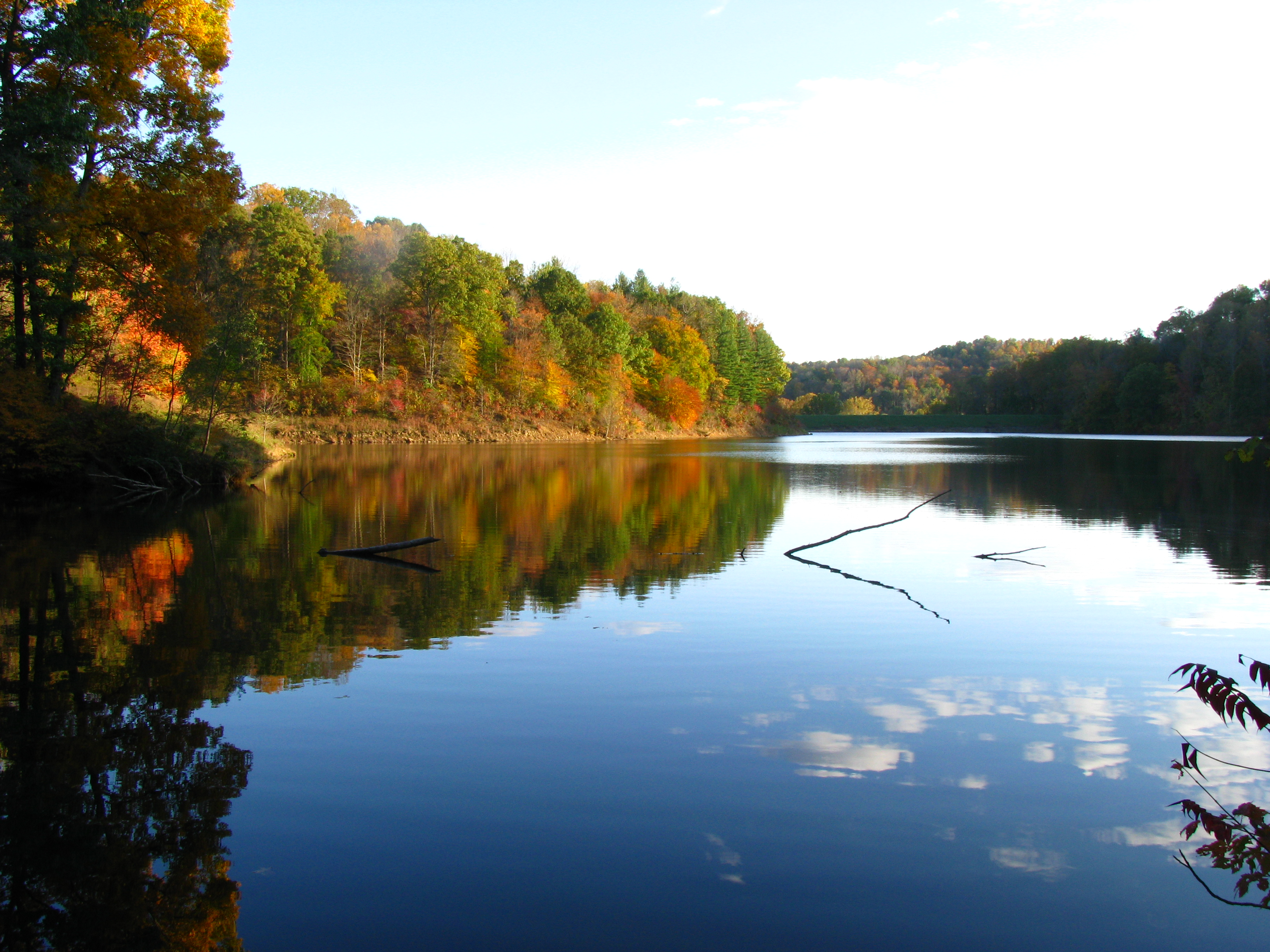
Fall foliage at Dow Lake

Strouds Run is located within the unglaciated Allegheny Plateau. The park consists of mostly narrow valleys, narrow ridges, and steep hillsides. Bluffs and rock shelters are common throughout the park, formed by the Connellsville sandstone. There are a few springs in the park out of the Ames limestone, including Linscott Spring (which has an historic springhouse). Normal pool elevation of Dow Lake is about 665 feet above sea level, while the highest point in the park is about 1022 feet above sea level. The park is almost entirely within the Strouds Run watershed, although it does not include the entire watershed.

The forest in some areas of the park is over a century old without significant disturbance. The Riddle State Nature Preserve is nearby, including Hawk Woods, which is one of Ohio's very few genuine old-growth forests.

Common birds in the park include both black and turkey vultures, Canada geese, red-winged blackbirds, red-tailed hawks, red-shouldered hawks, and barn swallows.

Beavers and white-tailed deer are common in the park. Bobcats are known to be in the area, but none are known within the park itself.

== Facilities and usage ==
Facilities include a campground (pit toilets, no shower), swimming beach, boat dock, boat and canoe rentals, pistol, picnic grounds and shelters, and hiking trails. Hunting is permitted in season. Shooting ranges are no longer available for the public.

Significant areas of the park are pine plantations (white and red) from the mid-twentieth century, when the land was purchased, originally as the Athens State Forest. There is also one small baldcypress plantation within the park. However, most of the area is mature hardwood forest. The park features many bluffs and rock outcrops of sandstone. Several beaver ponds are within the park boundaries.

Many of the trails are open to mountain bikes.

The lake is used by Ohio University for aquatic sports such as crew. The lake is also a very common destination of Ohio University students to enjoy the weather on sunny spring or summer days.

The lake is stocked on an annual basis with several kinds of fish, including rainbow trout, which cannot survive the winters.

== Adjacent public lands ==
The park borders on the city's 325-acre (1.32 km^{2}) Strouds Ridge Preserve Project, which includes the Riddle State Nature Preserve, and with the Athens Conservancy's 75 acre (0.3 km^{2}) Blair Preserve.

In addition, the 264-acre (1.07 km^{2}) Baker Tract, managed by the Athens Conservancy, is a short drive away, with a public access trailhead on Ohio State Route 690.
