= Clean Ohio =

The Clean Ohio Fund is Ohio's main funding source for open space conservation, farmland preservation, trail creation, brownfield restoration, and protection of ecologically sensitive areas. The fund was approved by voters in 2000 as a $400 million bond initiative and renewed for another eight years in 2008. Funding of $100 million for the fiscal years 2016-2018 is through the state capital appropriations bill. This includes $75 million for the Clean Ohio Green Space Conservation initiative, which preserves open spaces, sensitive ecological areas, and river and stream corridors.

== Clean Ohio Funds ==
- Clean Ohio Green Space Conservation Fund: To provide funds for preservation of land areas, either through fee-simple acquisition or through conservation easements. This fund is administered by the Ohio Public Works Commission.
- Clean Ohio Agricultural Easement Purchase Fund: To provide funds to ensure the continued presence and use of valuable agricultural lands. This fund is administered by the Ohio Department of Agriculture.
- Clean Ohio Brownfield Revitalization Fund: To provide funds for cleaning up brownfields and returning them to productive use. This fund is administered by the Ohio Department of Development. Grants were made available through 2013, and the agency still provides advice and assistance to localities for their efforts.
- Clean Ohio Recreational Trails Fund: To provide funds for establishing or expanding muscle-powered trails, or to purchase the right-of-way for such trails. This fund is administered by the Ohio Department of Natural Resources. The application is often combined with that for the Federal Recreational Trails Program, in which fund only 30% is dedicated to muscle-powered trails.

== See also ==
- 2000 in the environment
