= Hawk Woods =

Forest in Ohio, United States

Dale and Jackie Riddle State Nature Preserve
- Riddle State Nature Preserve
- IUCN category V (protected landscape/seascape)
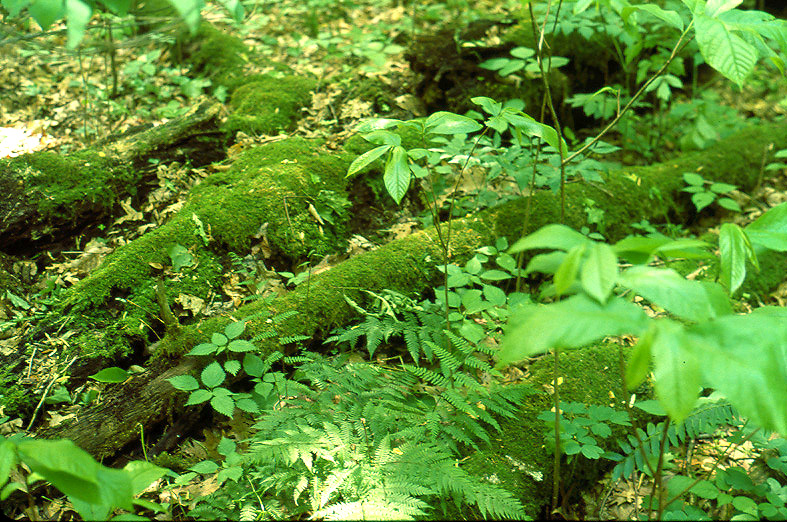
- Mossy decaying logs in the preserve.

- Location within Ohio Location within the United States
- Location: Athens County, Ohio
- Nearest city: Athens, OH
- Coordinates: 39.343633°N 82.074483°W
- Area: 189 acres (76 ha)
- Established: 2003
- Governing body: City of Athens, Ohio

Hawk Woods is an old-growth forest located in central Athens County, Ohio, United States, outside the city of Athens. The forest comprises 106 acres (0.43 km^{2}) of foothills in the Allegheny Plateau region. Adjacent to Strouds Run State Park, the woods now are included in a state nature preserve named the Dale & Jackie Riddle State Nature Preserve.

== Riddle State Nature Preserve ==
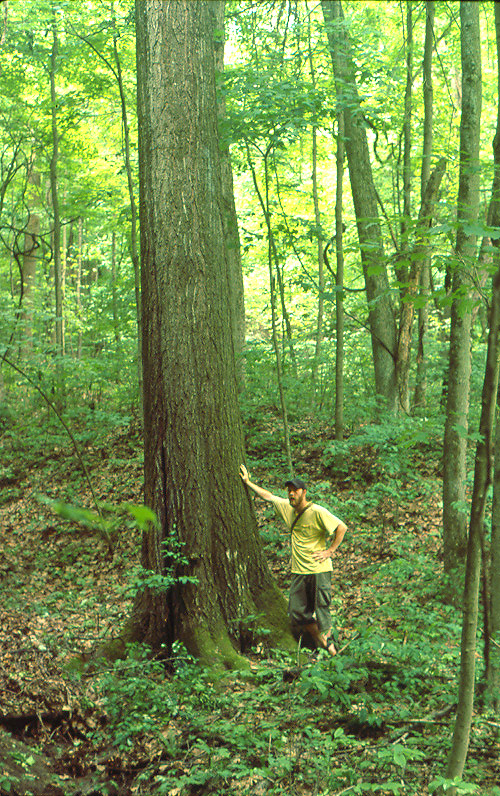
Large red oak (Quercus rubra) in Riddle State Nature Preserve.

The preserve is owned and managed by the City of Athens, with the original direction coming from the Athens Conservancy. This Ohio public land was dedicated as a state nature preserve, in part because the Ohio Division of Natural Areas and Preserves donated $50,000 towards the purchase price. The property was purchased from a logging company in 2003 for $550,000. Prior to 2003, the forest had been under private ownership, which kept it isolated from the public for at least 150 years.

The preserve is part of the city's east-side Strouds Ridge Preserve project, which to date includes about 325 acres (132 ha) total. The Athens Conservancy purchased an adjacent tract of land in 2018 to help buffer the forest from invasive species that result from outside development.

As with many other areas in southeast Ohio, the preserve suffers from white-tail deer overpopulation. A deer exclosure was built to demonstrate the effects of grazing pressure from the deer.

The preserve is known to harbor the relatively rare gametophytic fern species, the weft fern, Trichomanes intricatum.
