= Hockhocking Adena Bikeway =

Bicycle path in Athens County, Ohio

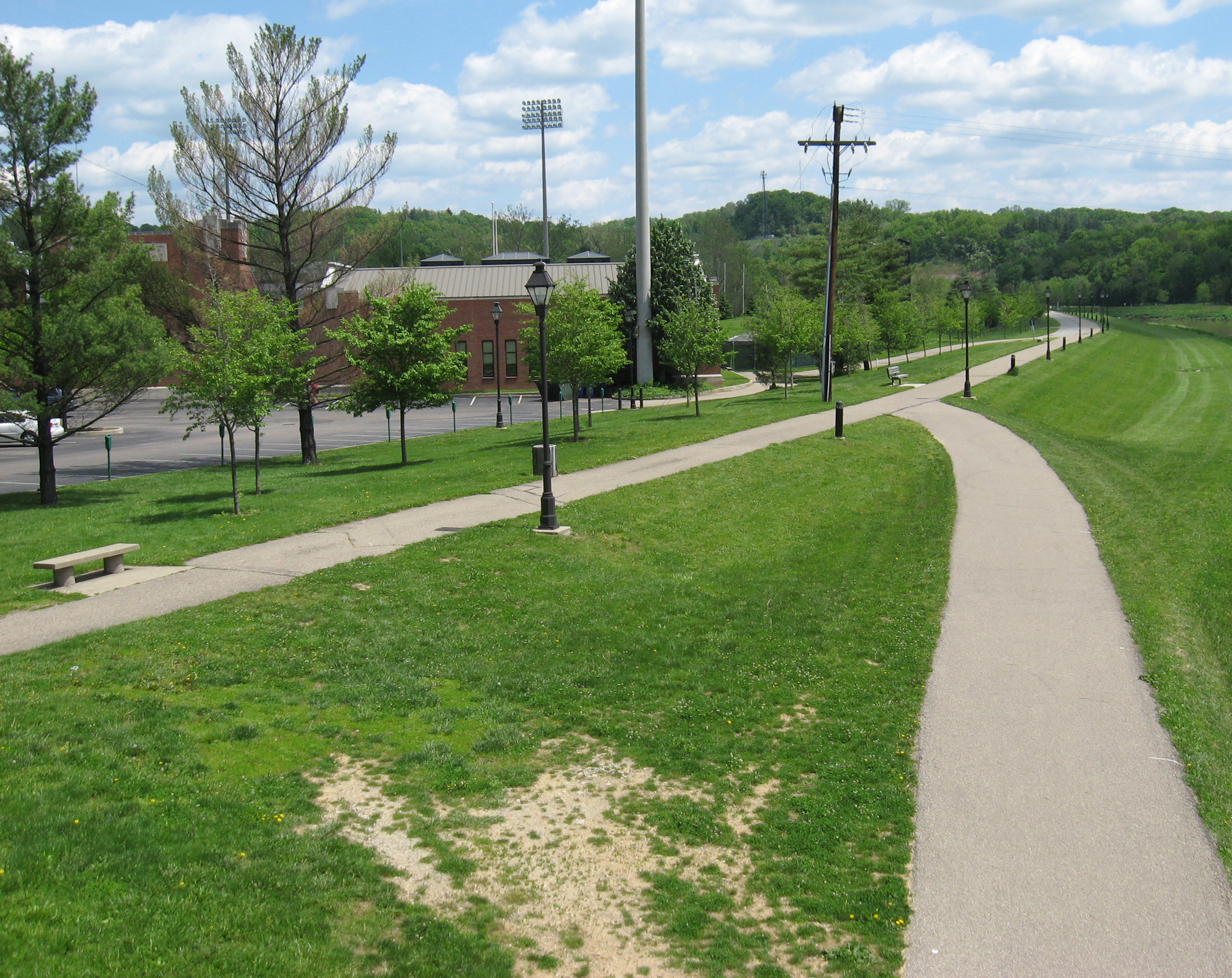
- The bikeway as it passes by Ohio University.
- Length: 22-mile (35 km)

The Hockhocking Adena Bikeway, known colloquially as The Bike Path or more formally (but unofficially) as The Athens County Bike Path, is a 22-mile (35 km) long bicycle path in Athens County, Ohio, in the United States. The original section of the path was built on a levee along the Hocking River at Ohio University in Athens, on university land. It was gradually expanded and now crosses university land, city land, and county land. The greater part of the path is a rail trail, (a bicycle path built on an abandoned railroad grade). The eastern terminus is at the western intersection of South Canaan Road and US-50. The western terminus is in Nelsonville, at the Rocky Brands Factory Outlet at the intersection of Canal Street and Myers Street, one block from the Historic Square Arts District.

The last section built was the section connecting the bikeway to Nelsonville. Previously, it terminated at Robbins Crossing on the Hocking College campus. There are current plans to extend the bikeway east along the south side of US-50 to South Canaan Road (County Road 24A). There are long-term plans to connect eastward via the Athens-Belpre Rail-Trail, now being developed, and to connect the Moonville Rail-Trail with it.

Parts of the bikeway are bordered by the Ohio University Campus, the Hocking College Campus, the Wayne National Forest, the Bluebell Preserve of the Athens Conservancy, and two city parks owned by the city of Athens.

In 2010 the Athens Conservancy purchased about thirteen miles of former B&O Railroad grade to expand trail opportunities, with the expectation that this right-of-way will eventually be connected to this bikeway.

== Location ==
- Western terminus: Nelsonville at 39°27′03″N 82°13′34″W
- Eastern terminus: East of Athens at 39°19′47″N 82°00′12″W
