= List of Ohio State Nature Preserves =

The state of Ohio has a procedure for dedicating properties as state nature preserves through the Ohio Division of Natural Areas & Preserves. Some preserves are owned outright by the state, while others are owned by other agencies. Some are open to the public, and others are not.

== List of Ohio State Nature Preserves ==
State Nature Preserve	Acres	County
Acadia Cliffs State Nature Preserve	112.5	Athens
Adams Lake Prairie Nature Preserve	22.37	Washington
Audubon Islands Nature Preserve	170	Lucas
Aurora Sanctuary State Nature Preserve	164	Portage
Baker Woods State Nature Preserve	47.3	Mercer
The Evans R. Beck Memorial Nature Preserve	10.1	Portage
Betsch Fen Nature Preserve	90.67	Ross
Bigelow Cemetery State Nature Preserve	0.5	Madison
Blackhand Gorge State Nature Preserve	956.5	Licking
Boch Hollow (Kessler) State Nature Preserve	571.0283	Hocking
Bonnett Pond Bog State Nature Preserve	16.52	Holmes
Boord State Nature Preserve	126.704	Washington
Brown's Lake Bog State Nature Preserve	99.16	Wayne
Burton Wetlands Nature Preserve	276.5476	Geauga
Caesar Creek Gorge State Nature Preserve	483.44	Warren
Louis W. Campbell Nature Preserve	210.09	Lucas
Carmean Woods State Nature Preserve	39.16	Crawford
Cedar Bog State Memorial	426.5	Champaign
Chaparral State Nature Preserve	66.67	Adams
Christmas Rocks State Nature Preserve	553.68	Fairfield
Clear Creek Nature Preserve	4769.21	Hocking, Fairfield
Clear Fork Gorge State Nature Preserve	28.77	Ashland
The Clifton Gorge - John L. Rich Nature Preserve	268.37	Greene
Collier State Nature Preserve	114.86	Seneca
O.E. Anderson Compass Plant Prairie	15.5	Lawrence
Conkles Hollow State Nature Preserve	86.88	Hocking
Conneaut Swamp State Nature Preserve	55.141	Ashtabula
Crabill Fen	31.66	Clark
Cranberry Bog State Nature Preserve	11	Licking
Crane Hollow Nature Preserve	1491.525	Hocking
Crooked Run Nature Preserve	77.51	Clermont
Dean A. Culberson State Nature Preserve	279.56	Clinton
Daughmer Prairie Savannah State Nature Preserve	33.656	Crawford
Davey Woods State Nature Preserve	103.17	Champaign
Davis Memorial State Nature Preserve	121.81	Adams
Marie J. Desonier Nature Preserve	491.34	Adams
Drew Woods State Nature Preserve	14.57	Darke
Dupont Marsh State Nature Preserve	113.94	Erie
Eagle Creek Nature Preserve	472.35	Portage
Emerald Hills State Nature Preserve	78.68	Belmont
Erie Sand Barrens State Nature Preserve	31.85	Erie
Flatiron Lake Bog Nature Preserve	97.09	Portage
Forrest Woods Nature Preserve	193.388	Paulding
Fowler Woods Nature Preserve	187.069	Richland
Gahanna Woods Nature Preserve	59.329	Franklin
John F. Gallagher Fen State Nature Preserve	212.75	Clark
Goll Woods Nature Preserve	320.64	Fulton
Goode Prairie State Nature Preserve	28.43	Miami
Alice and George Gott State Nature Preserve	44.92	Portage
Greenbelt Nature Preserve	97.3	Hamilton
Greenville Falls	79.45	Miami
Samuel Gross Memorial Woods Nature Preserve	48.54	Shelby
Hach-Otis State Nature Preserve	81.11	Lake
Halls Creek Woods State Nature Preserve	218.71	Warren
Headlands Dunes State Nature Preserve	25	Lake
J. Arthur Herrrick State Nature Preserve	126.5	Portage
Hueston Woods Nature Preserve	200	Butler
Edward F. Hutchins Nature Preserve	206.48	Delaware
Irwin Prairie Nature Preserve	226.467	Lucas
Jackson Bog State Nature Preserve	63.382	Stark
Johnson Ridge	208.43	Adams
Johnson Woods State Nature Preserve	205.79	Wayne
Ka-ma-ma Prairie State Nature Preserve	85.983	Adams
Karlo Fen	14.6	Summit
Kendrick Woods State Nature Preserve	159.24	Allen
Kent Bog State Nature Preserve	41.69	Portage
Kessler Swamp State Nature Preserve	20.315	Hocking
Kiser Lake Wetlands Nature Preserve	51.29	Champaign
Kitty Todd Nature Preserve	615.77	Lucas
Knox Woods	29.83	Knox
Arthur Kyle State Nature Preserve	81.86	Mahoning
Ladd Natural Bridge State Nature Preserve	34.98	Washington
Lake Katharine State Nature Preserve	2018.968	Jackson
Lakeside Daisy State Nature Preserve	19.09	Ottawa
Lash's Bog State Nature Preserve	59.543	Stark
Lawrence Woods State Nature Preserve	1034.93	Hardin
Little Rocky Hollow Nature Preserve	259.04	Hocking
Mantua Bog State Nature Preserve	104.81	Portage
Marsh Wetlands State Nature Preserve	152.28	Portage
William C. McCoy State Nature Preserve	193.65	Ashtabula
McCracken Fen State Nature Preserve	93.62	Logan
Mentor Marsh Nature Preserve	672.85	Lake
Milford Center Railroad Prairie	9.4	Union
Eugene & Henrietta Miller Nature Sanctuary	86.02	Highland
Morris Woods State Nature Preserve	107.21	Licking
Mud Lake Bog State Nature Preserve	74.01	Williams
Myersville Fen State Nature Preserve	27.24	Summit
Newberry Wildlife Sanctuary State Nature Preserve	50.03	Hamilton
Kelleys Island North Pond State Nature Preserve	50.79	Erie
North Shore Alvar State Nature Preserve	2.08	Erie
Blanche Katharine Novak Audubon Wildlife Sanctuary State Nature Preserve	149	Portage
Old Woman Creek State Nature Preserve	570.81	Erie
Augusta - Anne Olsen State Nature Preserve	132.13	Huron
David B. Owens Fen State Nature Preserve	18.59	Logan
Pallister State Nature Preserve	103.5563	Ashtabula
Pickerington Ponds Nature Preserve	405.98	Franklin
Portage Lakes Wetlands	5.86	Summit
Prairie Road Fen State Nature Preserve	94.49	Clark
Raven Rock Nature Preserve	95.27	Scioto
Rhododendron Cover State Nature Preserve	74.98	Fairfield
Kleimaier Rododendron Hollow	31.59	Fairfield
Wahkeena State Nature Preserve	68.271	Fairfield
Dale and Jackie Riddle State Nature Preserve	105.66	Athens
Rockbridge State Nature Preserve	181.03	Hocking
Etawah Woods Nature Preserve	1166.652	Highland
Rome State Nature Preserve	104.842	Ashtabula
Rothenbuhler Woods Nature Preserve	44.33	Monroe
Saltpetre Cave Nature Preserve	14.249	Hocking
Scioto Brush Creek	30.2	Scioto
Paul B. Sears Woods State Nature Preserve	137.25	Crawford
Seymour Woods	106	Delaware
Shallenberger Nature Preserve	87.57	Fairfield
Sharon Woods Gorge State Nature Preserve	20.86	Hamilton
Sheepskin Hollow State Nature Preserve	453.176	Columbiana
Sheick Hollow Nature Preserve	151	Hocking
Sheldon's Marsh State Nature Preserve	472.48	Erie
Shoemaker State Nature Preserve	22.394	Adams
Siegenthaler - Kaestner Esker State Nature Preserve	36.88	Champaign
Smith Cemetery State Nature Preserve	0.63	Madison
Spring Beauty Dell State Nature Preserve	41.26	Hamilton
Spring Brook Sanctuary State Nature Preserve	31.737	Geauga
Springville Marsh Nature Preserve	201.37	Seneca
Stages Pond Nature Preserve	177.99	Pickaway
Strait Creek Prairie Bluff Prairie Preserve	136.96	Adams, Pike
Stratford Woods State Nature Preserve	95.1	Delaware
Swamp Cottonwood	20.52	Medina
Edward S. Thomas Scenic Nature Preserve	319.88	Franklin
Tinkers Creek State Nature Preserve	786	Portage, Summit
Travertine Fen State Nature Preserve	21.88	Greene
Triangle Lake Bog	61.13	Portage
Trillium Trails State Nature Preserve	22.91	Hamilton
Walter A. Tucker Scenic Nature Preserve	54.67	Fairfield
Charles A. Tummonds Scenic River Preserve	85.67	Portage
Wardner - Perkins State Nature Preserve	25.66	Hamilton
Robert A. Whipple State Nature Preserve	269.671	Adams
White Pine Bog Forest Nature Preserve	375.87	Geauga
Zimmerman Prairie	3.48	Greene
