= Hocking State Forest =

State forest in Hocking County, Ohio

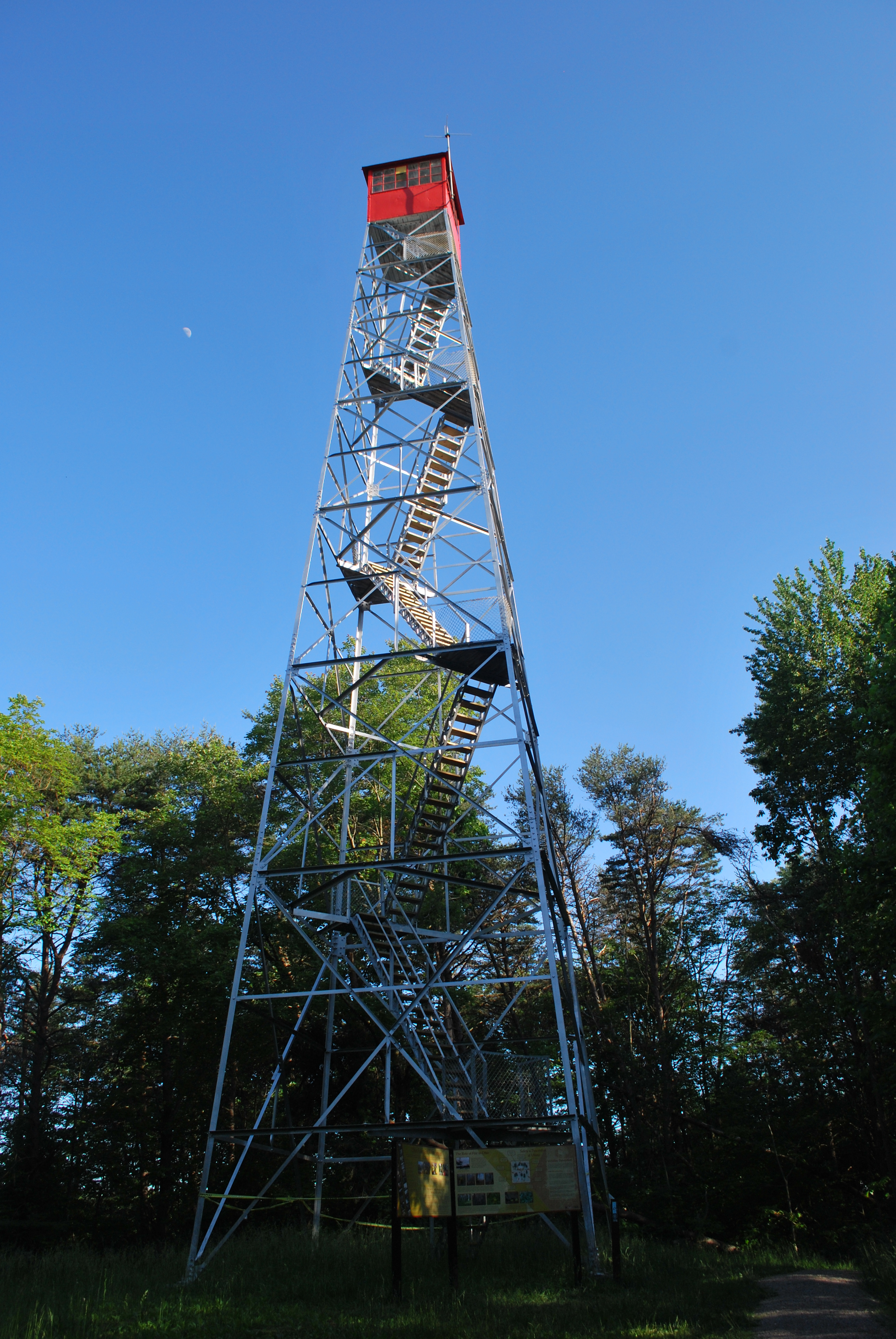
- Ash Cave Fire Tower

- Location within Ohio
- Location: Hocking, Ohio, United States
- Coordinates: 39°26′N 82°32′W
- Area: 9,696 acres (39.24 km^{2})
- Elevation: 840 ft (260 m)
- Established: 1949
- Website: Hocking State Forest

Hocking State Forest is a state forest in Hocking County, Ohio, United States. The forest adjoins Hocking Hills State Park and three nature preserves including Conkle's Hollow State Nature Preserve.

The forest is in one of the most scenic areas of Ohio, known as the Hocking Hills. The area features not only forests, but frequent bluffs, rock shelters and waterfalls, due to the Blackhand sandstone.

== Overview ==
Hocking State Forest is a 9,817-acre public forest in Hocking County, Ohio, managed by the Ohio Department of Natural Resources (ODNR). The forest borders Hocking Hills State Park and offers trails, climbing, and natural scenery across a rugged Appalachian landscape.

== Geography and geology ==
The forest sits in the unglaciated Allegheny Plateau and features exposed Blackhand sandstone, steep ridges, and narrow valleys. Elevation ranges from 760 to just over 1,100 feet. The landscape includes rock shelters and cliffs, with nearby attractions like Rock House (Ohio) and Cantwell Cliffs offering similar geology.

== Ecology and wildlife ==
Native trees include eastern hemlock, oaks, maples, hickories, and tulip poplar. Understory plants like rhododendron and bigleaf magnolia are also common. Wildlife includes deer, turkeys, salamanders, owls, and seasonal warblers. The forest supports migratory and nesting birds and is listed as a hotspot for birding in Ohio.

== Recreation ==
The forest includes over 59 miles of bridle trails, hiking paths, and areas for climbing and rappelling. A public archery range and primitive camping areas are open seasonally. Hunters use parts of the forest during state-managed game seasons. Some trails follow firebreaks built in the 1930s.

== History ==
The state began acquiring the land in the early 20th century to reverse the effects of logging and poor farming. During the 1930s, the Civilian Conservation Corps (CCC) helped replant trees and build trails. In 1949, the area was officially designated a state forest. From the 1950s to the 1970s, the Hocking Honor Camp operated within the forest, and inmates worked on trail crews and fire response. The region also has deep Indigenous roots. Earthworks linked to the Adena and Hopewell cultures still exist nearby, such as the Fortner Mounds and Ety Enclosure.

== See also ==
- Hocking Hills State Park
- Clear Creek Metro Park
- List of Ohio state forests
