= Hocking Hills State Park =

State park in Ohio, United States

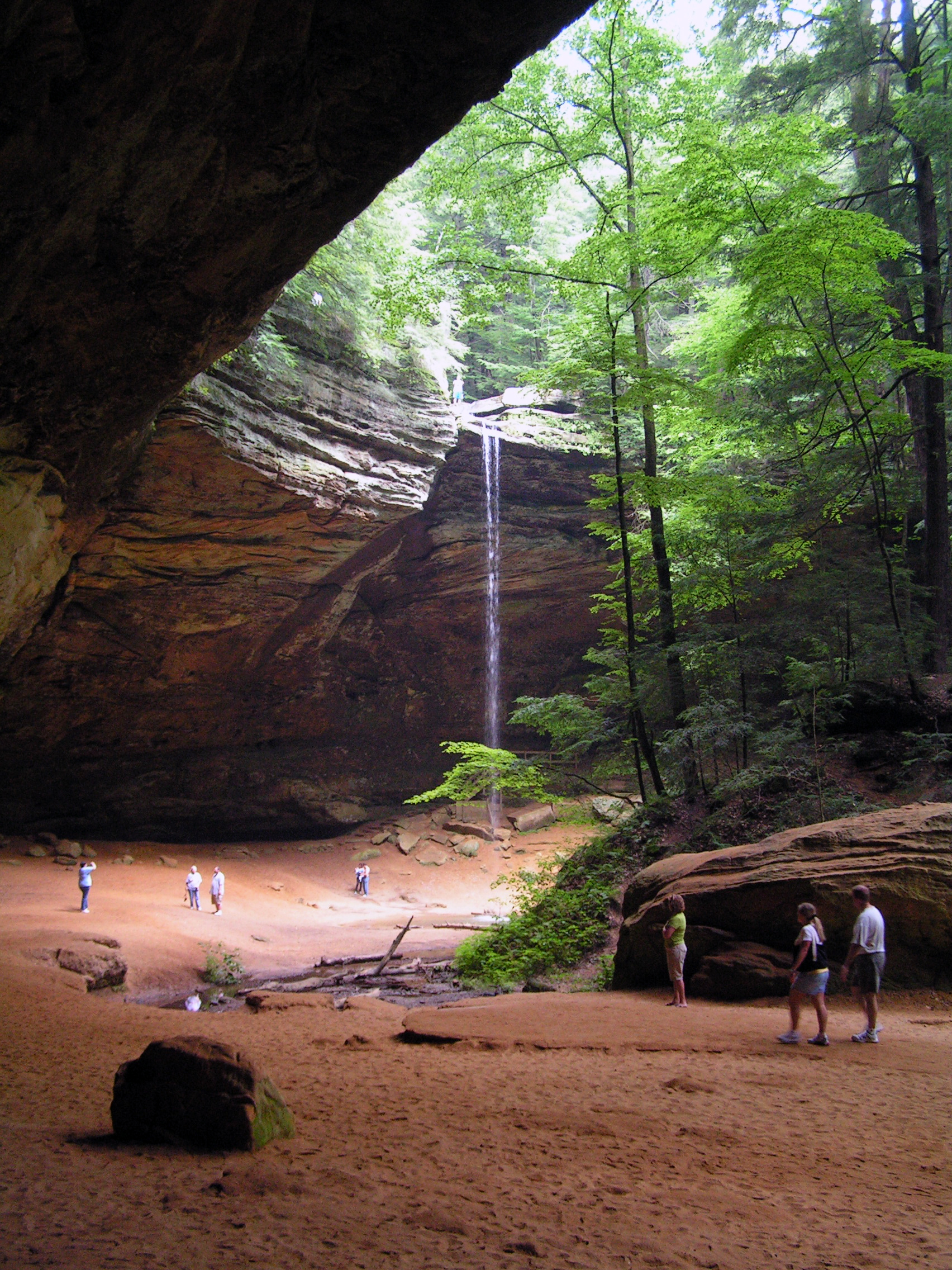
- Ash Cave

- Location within Ohio Location within the United States
- Location: Hocking County, Ohio, US
- Nearest city: Logan, Ohio
- Coordinates: 39°25′50″N 82°32′20″W
- Area: 2,356 acres (9.53 km^{2}); Water: 17 acres (6.9 ha)
- Established: 1924
- Governing body: Ohio Department of Natural Resources

Hocking Hills State Park is a state park in the Hocking Hills region of Hocking County, Ohio, United States. In some areas the park adjoins the Hocking State Forest. Within the park are over 25 miles (40 km) of hiking trails, rock formations, waterfalls, and recess caves. The trails are open from dawn to dusk, all year round, including holidays.

The park contains six main hiking areas: Ash Cave, Cantwell Cliffs, Cedar Falls, Old Man's Cave, Rock House and Whispering Cave.

== History ==
=== Geological history ===
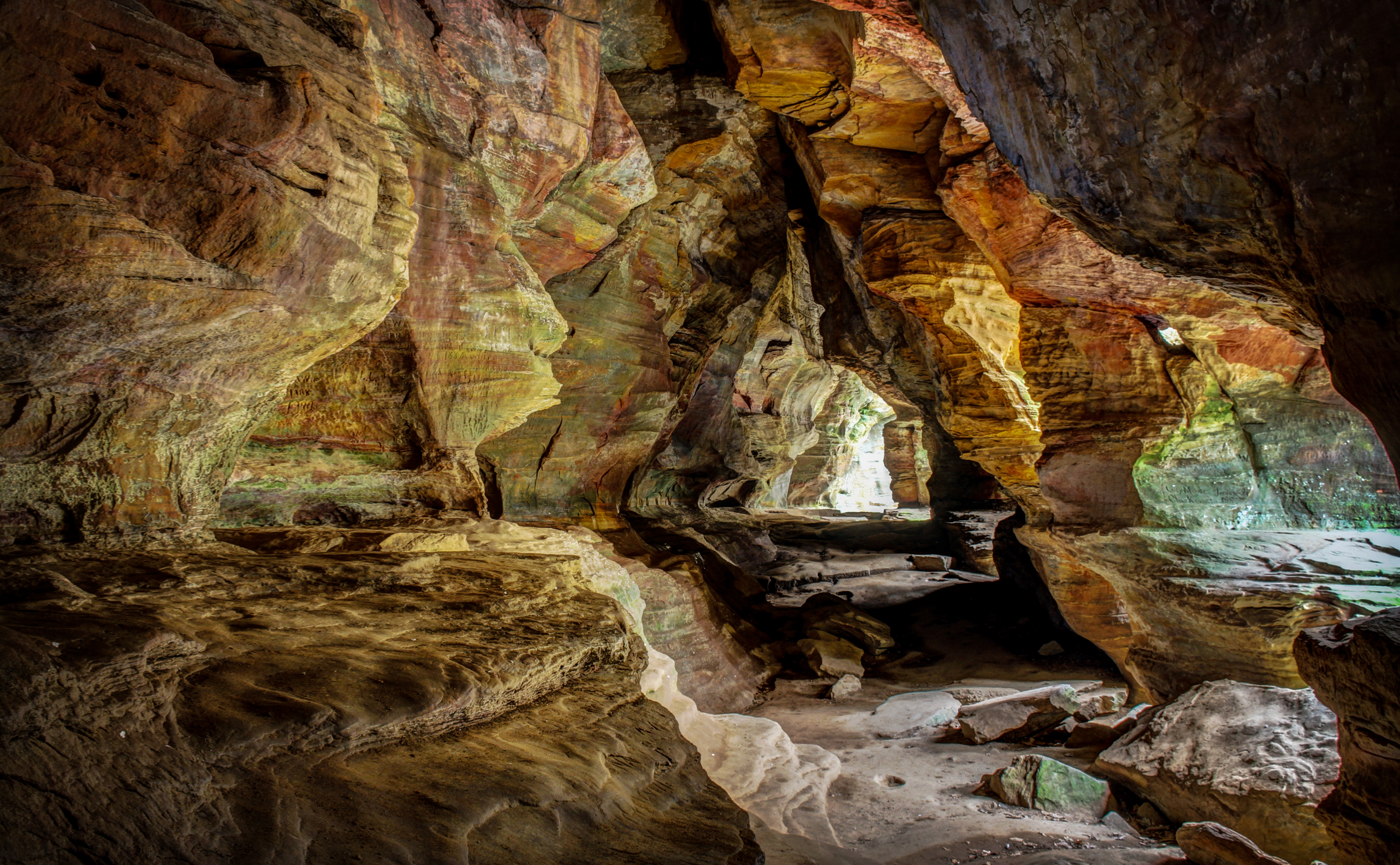
Rock House

More than 330 million years ago, the area was covered by the waters of the Atlantic Ocean. The ocean's currents deposited immense amounts of sand and gravel over time. The ocean gradually receded and millions of years of groundwater and streams eroded the soft sandstone to form immense rock formations and waterfalls.

Hocking Hills were hemmed in by the ancient north-flowing Teays River to the west, and the then north-flowing Hocking to the east. When the Wisconsin Glacier began melting back to the north about 10,000 years ago, the landscape would undergo dramatic changes. The ancient Teays River was buried under tons of glacial silt, and the direction of the Hocking River was reversed.

The Hockhocking enters the county from Good Hope Township in the northwest and then flows southwest, touches Marion Township, continues through Falls and Green Townships, and exits the county through northwestern Starr Township. The river is then in Athens County.

=== Settlement ===
Hocking County was named after the Hockhocking River. Hockhocking, in the Delaware tongue, signifies a bottle. In Shawnee, Wea-tha-Kagh-Qua-sepe, meant bottle river. The Hockhocking River had a waterfall of nearly 20 feet located about 6 or 7 miles northwest of Lancaster. Above the falls, the creek was very narrow and straight, forming the "bottle" neck.

Early settlers in Muskingum County found an ancient black human handprint on a cliff that is part of this same sandstone formation. That is the same "Black Hand Sandstone" that is seen in six areas of the Hocking Hills State Park.

The Adena culture is believed to be one of the first inhabitants of the area of Hocking Hills. In the 18th century, the Native American Tribes of Delaware, Wyandot, and Shawnee travelled through and lived in the area. In 1818, Hocking County was created in Ohio. A powder mill was built in the area in the 1830s and in 1840 Hocking Canal was completed, allowing for more settlers to travel there.

Richard Rowe, an 18th-century trader and hermit, is believed to be the namesake of Old Man's Cave. Rowe and his hounds lived in the cave from 1796 until his death in the early 1800s.

=== State park ===
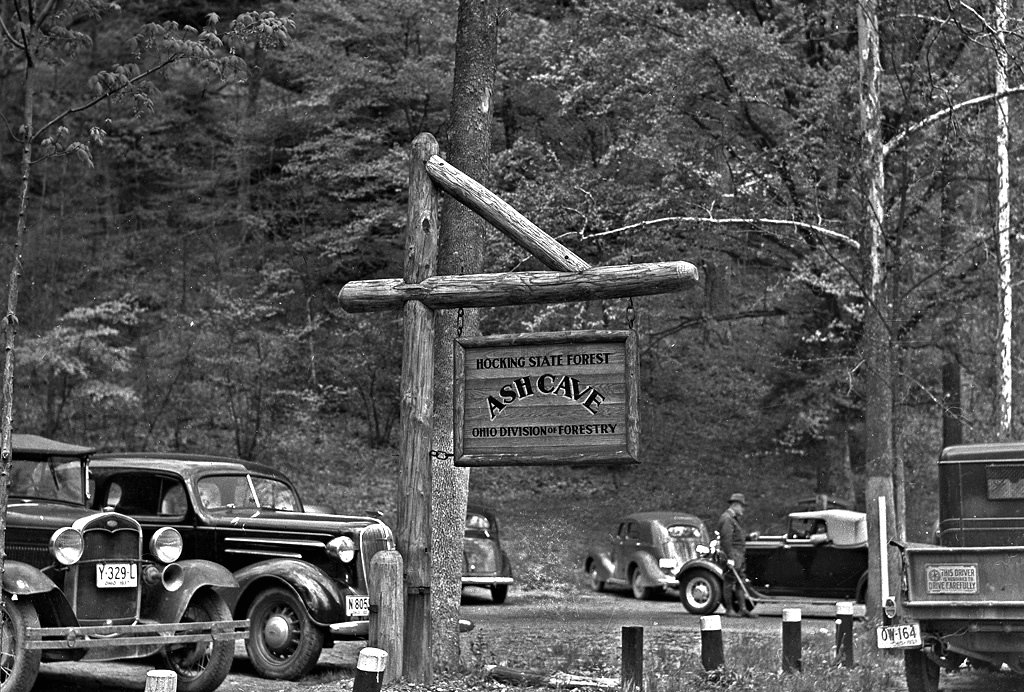
Ash Cave entrance in 1937

The State of Ohio began acquiring land for state forests in 1916, initially to test reforestation methods. Acquisition in the Hocking Hills region began in 1924 with the goal of repairing land harmed by farming and wildfires.

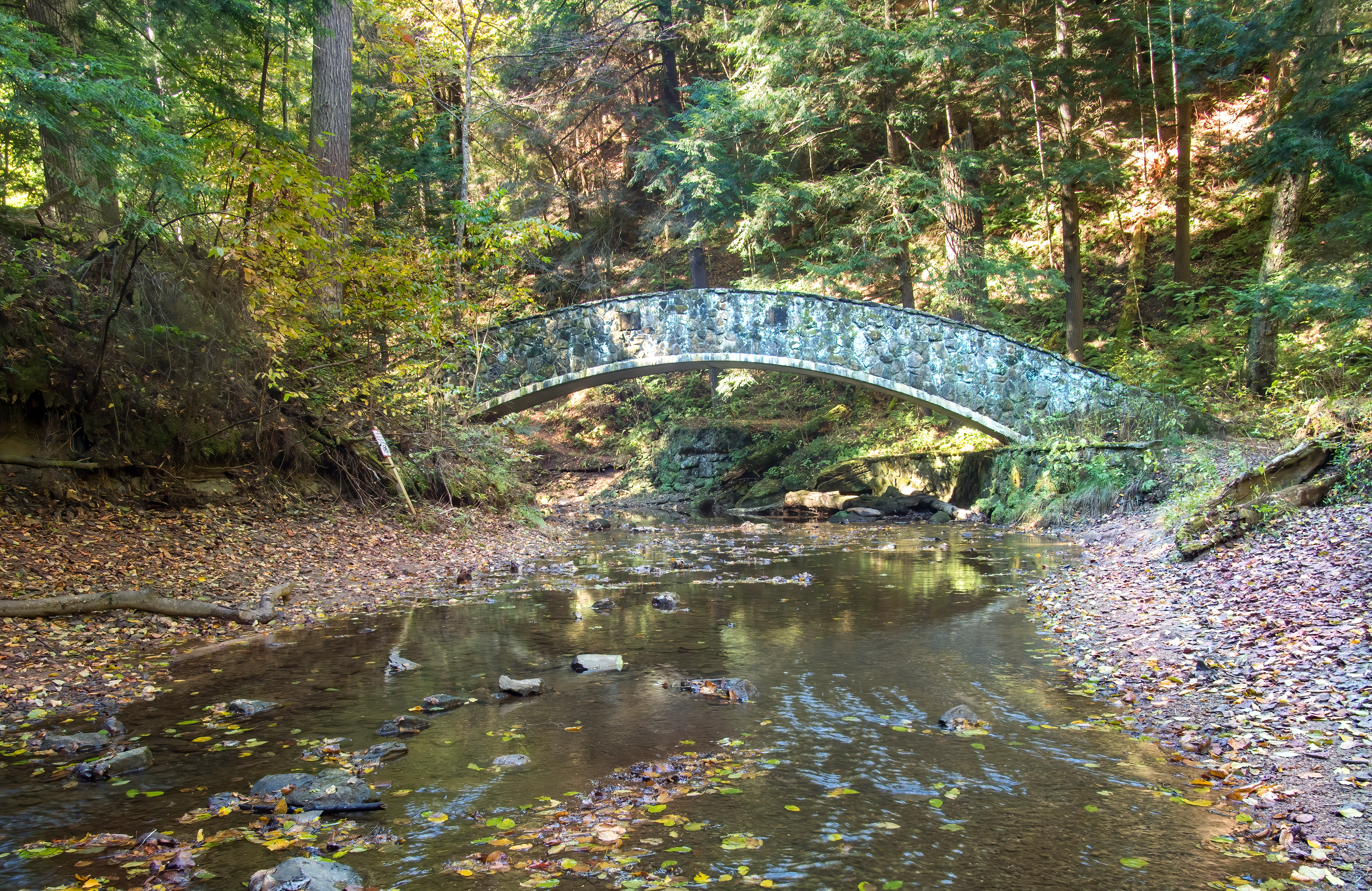
A Civilian Conservation Corps-built bridge at Old Man's Cave

In 1933 the Civilian Conservation Corps (CCC) was formed as a way to provide employment to single young unemployed adult men. Multiple CCC camps were located in the Southeast Ohio region, all focused on various public work projects to help the area recover economically from the Great Depression. Company 505 was one of the first in Ohio and based at Camp Hocking near Conkles Hollow. This company worked on numerous projects including erosion control, trail construction and maintenance, and stone masonry for newly formed trails in sites like Tar Hollow, Ash Cave, and Old Man's Cave. The main cabin of Camp Hocking has been preserved and is located next to Conkles Hollow.

Another troop, Company 526, was based at Camp Logan and largely employed Black workers who were twice as likely to suffer from unemployment during the Depression. Workers from Company 526 improved places including the Cantwell Cliffs, Rock House, and Rockbridge sites. By the time of the camp's closure in 1937, Company 526 had built and paved miles of roadways, improved over 2,000 acres of parkland and planted 300,000 trees.

Additional planting and reforesting work took place during the 1950s by prisoners from the Hocking Honor Camp. Inmates planted trees and pruned plantations. The prisoners earned between half a cent to five cents an hour for their labor. According to the Logan Daily News, Hocking Honor inmates "worked closely with the Hocking County area and the community, an idea that seems absurd today"

The park grew to become a popular and widely visited area. In 1967 Grandma Gatewood began leading a January hike in the park which continued as an annual tradition after her final time leading it in 1973. The trail she took was later named in her honor.

== Natural sites ==
The state park contains several distinct landmarks that can be accessed from hiking trails.

=== Ash Cave ===
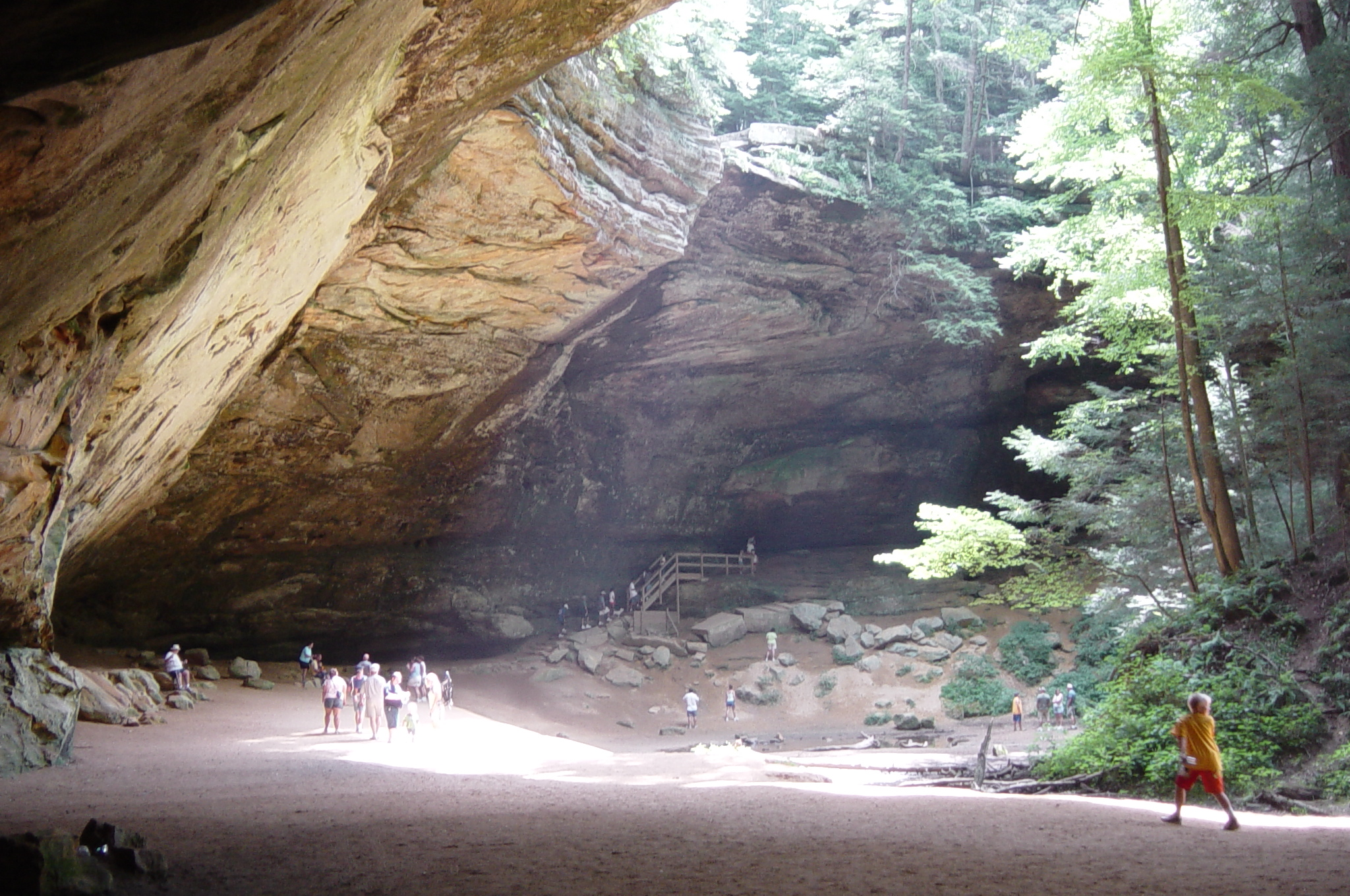
The Ash Cave complex

Like many of the caves located within the Hocking Hills, Ash Cave is a recess cave formed by the gradual erosion of sandstone over centuries. It measures 700 feet from end-to-end and rises 90 feet tall at its highest point.

The cave was named for large piles of ashes that white settlers found on the cave floor when they first visited the site. Archeologists believe these were the remains of campfires that accumulated over centuries of use by indigenous cultures.

The cave is renowned for its scale and superb acoustics. In recent years the space has been used to host meetings, worship services, and, since 2022, annual summer concerts by the Columbus Symphony Orchestra.

=== Cantwell Cliffs ===
Located at the northern edge of the Hocking Hills, Cantwell Cliffs is named for the Cantwell family who settled in the region. It is one of the more rugged hiking areas in Hocking Hills State Park and traces a cliff and gorge with steep inclines.

There are two trail loop options through the Cantwell Cliffs, both with a shared starting point. Together they are about 1.3 miles long, with significant incline changes along the path. The cliffs feature multiple waterfalls which have peak waterflow in spring but are often dry in the summer.

=== Cedar Falls ===
This waterfall, the greatest in the Hocking Hills in terms of water volume, was named by settlers who mistook the region's hemlock trees for cedar.

From the site's parking lot, visitors walk down a series of gradual stairs that are considered an outdoor sculpture called Democracy Steps designed by architect Aiko Hizume in 1997. At the bottom of the steps they reach the bottom of a wide gorge. Proceeding one direction leads to Cedar Falls, and the other direction takes visitors on the Grandma Gatewood path to Old Man's Cave.

=== Old Man's Cave ===
This trail and cave, believed to be named for the 18th century hermit Richard Rowe, is the most popular site within the Hocking Hills region.

The main trail follows a gorge or varying width and crosses several waterfalls with arched stone bridges. The area can be divided into five main sections: Upper Falls, Upper Gorge, Middle Falls, Lower Falls, and Lower Gorge, which spans around half a mile in total length. The namesake cave is a recess cave carved out of an overhanging cliff, with traversing trails passing inside it. Old Man's Cave is also the site of many smaller landmarks, such as the Devil's Bathtub, Eagle Rock, and Sphinx Head.

=== Rock House ===
This is the only non-recess cave within Hocking Hills State Park, with a main section around 25 feet high, 200 feet long, and 20-30 feet wide. A row of seven openings provide a view past the formation's stone columns and into the surrounding forest.

The cave was used by indigenous people for thousands of years, and the location has been a tourist destination since the construction of the Rock House Hotel in 1835.

=== Whispering Cave ===
Whispering Cave is the most recent addition to Hocking Hills State Park, becoming accessible to the public in 2017 via the Hemlock Bridge trail. Like many other sites in the region, it is a recess cave of eroded sandstone. It is named for its unique acoustics, said to allow for a whisper to carry from one end of the cave to the other.

Whispering Cave had been on the property of Hocking Hills State park for decades but was not an official site until Jim Schaefer, a frequent visitor to the site, contacted the park to suggest improving and formally incorporating the unmarked trail leading around it as part of the park. Starting in 2015, Schaefer and a crew of volunteers worked with the park to install a swinging bridge and wooden boardwalks to the trail and recess cave. The new site formally opened to the public in 2017.

=== Natural sites outside the state park ===
Hocking Hills State Park is embedded within the Hocking State Forest, which contains many separate hiking trails and natural features open to the public.

Additional natural sites include:

- The Buckeye Trail, which has a 52.5 mile Old Man's Cave section passing through the Hocking Hills area.
- Clear Creek Metro Park, a Columbus Metroparks property north of the Hocking Hills that features similar sandstone cliffs, ravines, and forest.
- Conkles Hollow State Nature Preserve, a state-managed preserve that is commonly listed alongside the natural sites within Hocking Hills State Park. The hollow features two trails, one rim trail following the upper edge of the gorge and a handicap-accessible trail that follows the gorge bottom.
- The John Glenn Astronomy Park, named after astronaut and US Senator John Glenn, opened in June 2018. During the day, visitors can study the position of the Sun and orientation throughout the year. At night, visitors can see the planets and stars not being obstructed by light pollution.
- Lake Logan State Park covers 400 acres, 320 acres of which is dry land, and is two miles long. The lake was built in 1955 for recreational purposes and offers visitors hiking, boating, picnicking and swimming.
- Rockbridge State Nature Preserve, a park centered around a natural arch north of the Hocking Hills.

== Accommodations ==
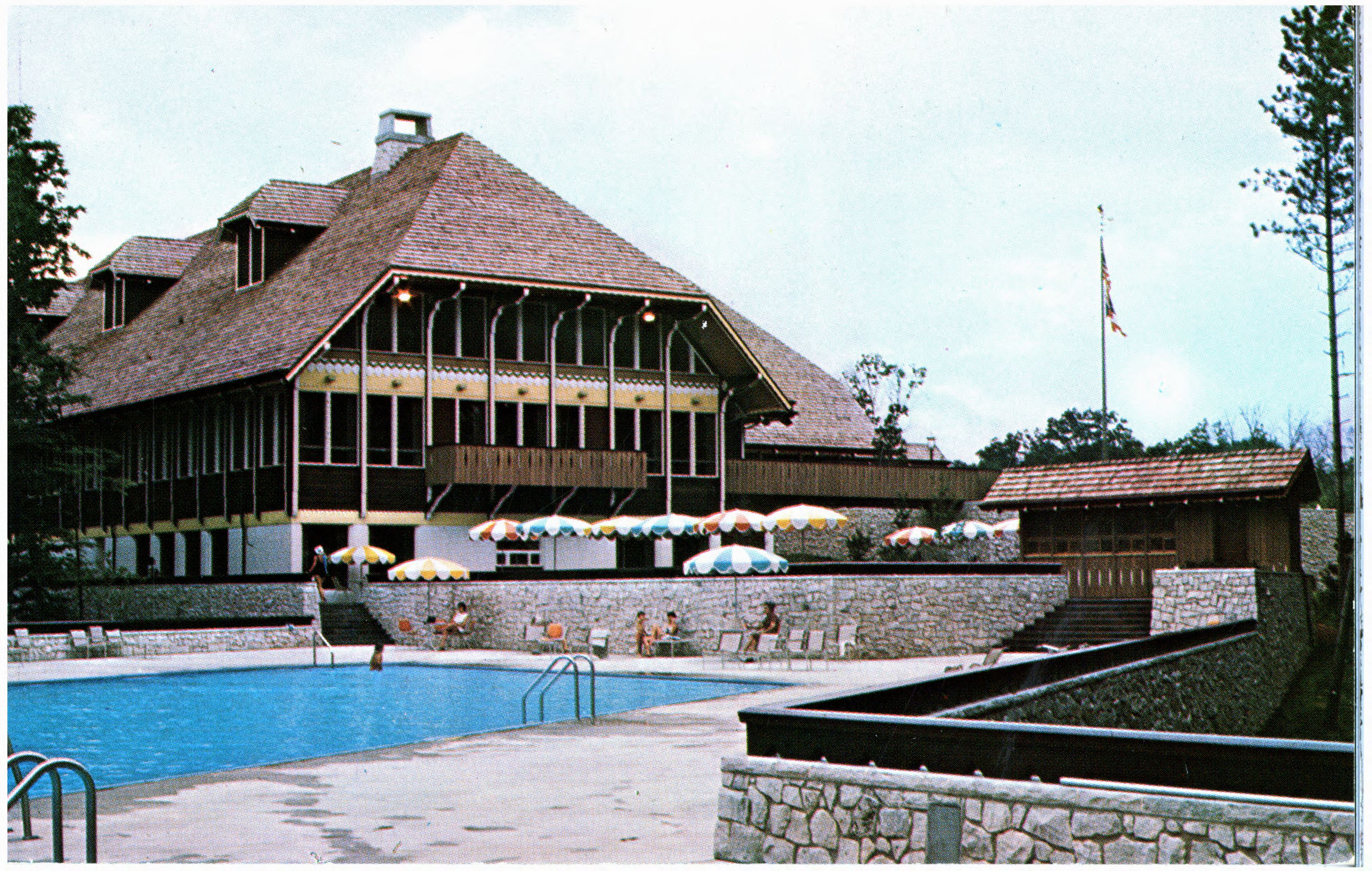
The 1970 Hocking Hills Lodge

There are about 200 campsites in Hocking Hills State Park Campground, including full hookup and electric camp sites with 20-, 30- or 50-amp service, and camping shelters. The park also offers primitive "hike-in" tent-only sites and a primitive Group Camp in their own areas of the park. The campground is close to all of the hiking trails in the area and has flush toilets, shower houses with hot water, vending machines, a camp store, a pool, and other amenities. Reservations for camping may be made up to 6 months in advance.

The first Hocking Hills Lodge was built in 1970 and destroyed by fire in 2016. A new lodge and conference center opened in the state park in autumn 2022 with 81 guest rooms as well as a restaurant, fitness room, and indoor and outdoor swimming pools. There are also many privately owned cabins and hotels in the surrounding region.

In 2017, over 2 million people visited Hocking Hills. To handle the growing tourism, a summer shuttle service from downtown Logan began to lessen the overtaxing on the park's parking facilities.

== Surrounding region ==
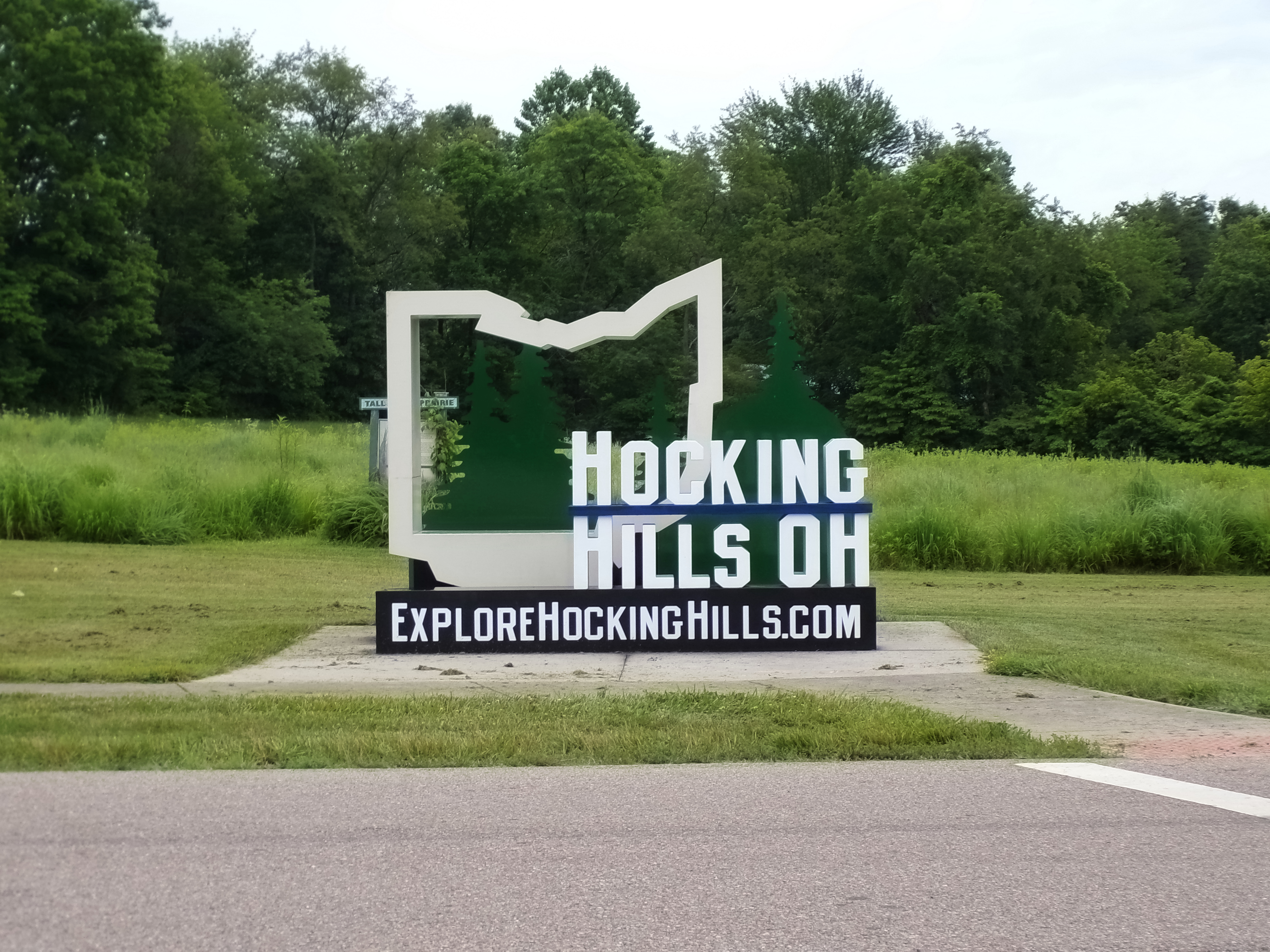
A sign near the Hocking Hills welcome center in Logan, Ohio

The area around the state park is known as the Hocking Hills region. In the 2010s the region began to draw wider attention as a destination for ecotourism within driving distance of major cities in the Midwest. Area cities such as Logan began to suffer housing shortages as residential properties were converted into short-term rentals.

When Hocking County regulators proposed the first county requirements specific to rental properties in 2026, an industry group representing lodge owners led fierce pushback against the proposal. The zoning commission sought to require rental owners to have a local contact person and meet basic safety standards in their properties.

Other attractions include:

- Boating: Canoeing, kayaking and rafting are all allowed on various places in the state park.
- Rock Climbing and Rappelling: Ninety-nine acres of forest land have been set aside for rock climbing and rappelling in Hocking State Forest.
- Swimming: Lake Logan offers swimming and beaches for visitors. There is also a swimming pool open to the public outside of the Hocking Hills State Park lodge.
- Hunting and fishing: Hunting and fishing are permitted as regulated by the Division of Wildlife. With permits, visitors are allowed to hunt during hunting season. Fishing is permitted in Lake Logan and Rose Lake, which can include a variety of fish such as bluegill, crappie, bass, saugeye and catfish.
- Bird Watching: Hocking Valley Birding Trail identifies opportunities for bird watchers to enjoy the avian life in Hocking Hills.
- Archery: The Hocking Hills State Park offers a free archery range.
- Horseback Riding: Hocking Hills State Park provides horseback riding trails that share space with both hiking trails and hunting areas.
- Train Rides: The Hocking Valley Scenic Railway operates out of Nelsonville, Ohio.
- Weddings: Some individuals have chosen to use the State Park as their outdoor wedding ceremony location.

== In popular culture ==
Many of the adventures in Jeff Smith's comic book series Bone take place in Old Man's Cave, a place inspired by the Hocking Hills State Park, which Smith enjoyed since he was a child. The waterfalls of the park also influenced Smith's frequent use of water as a recurring visual element in Bone, calling it "an age-old storytelling symbol".

Fictionalized versions of areas within Hocking Hills State Park appear in the Burning Springs region of the video game Fallout 76. This update, released in December 2025, allowed players to explore a camp inside Ash Cave and collect pieces of loot.

== Gallery ==
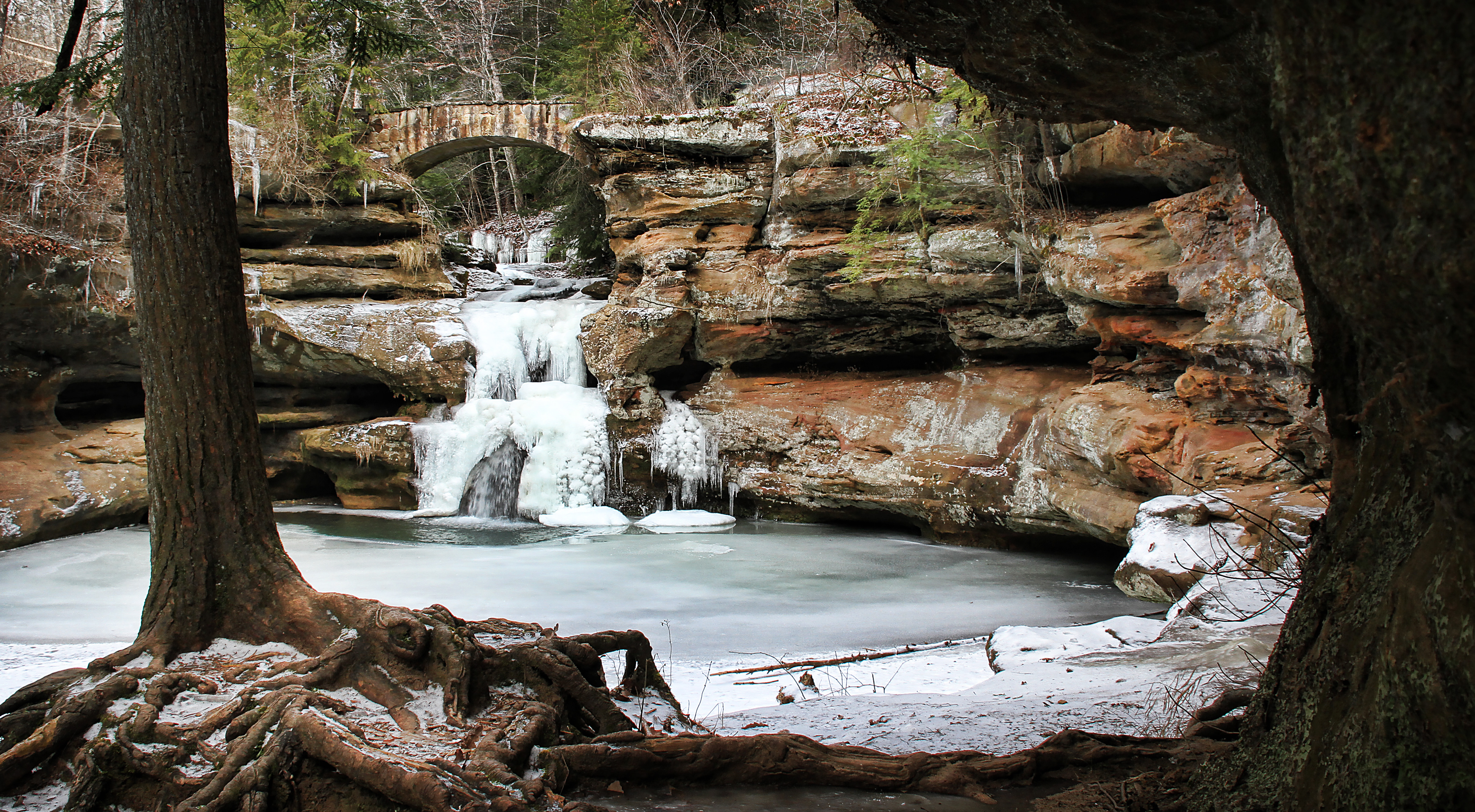
Upper Falls of Old Man's Cave in winter

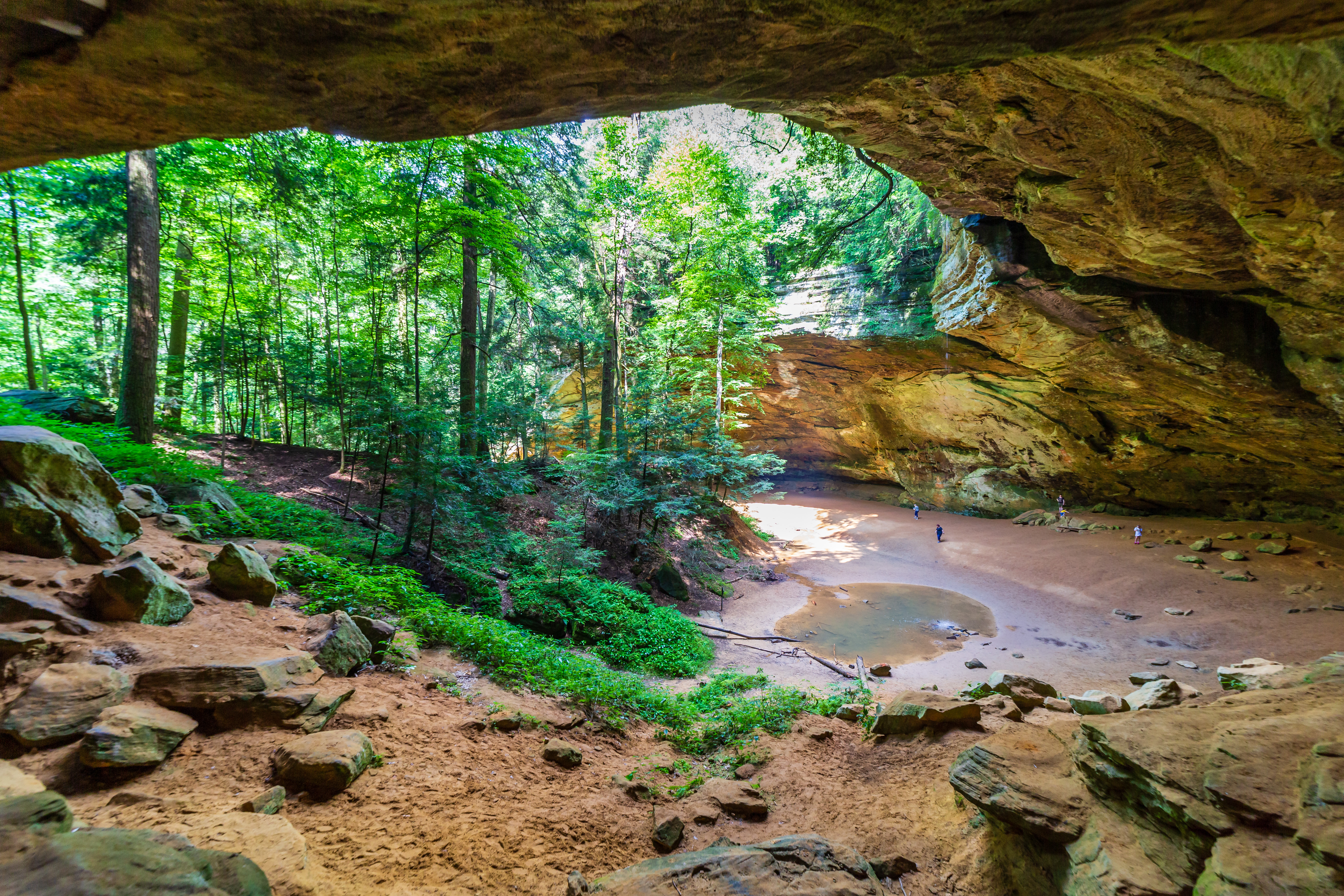
Ash Cave

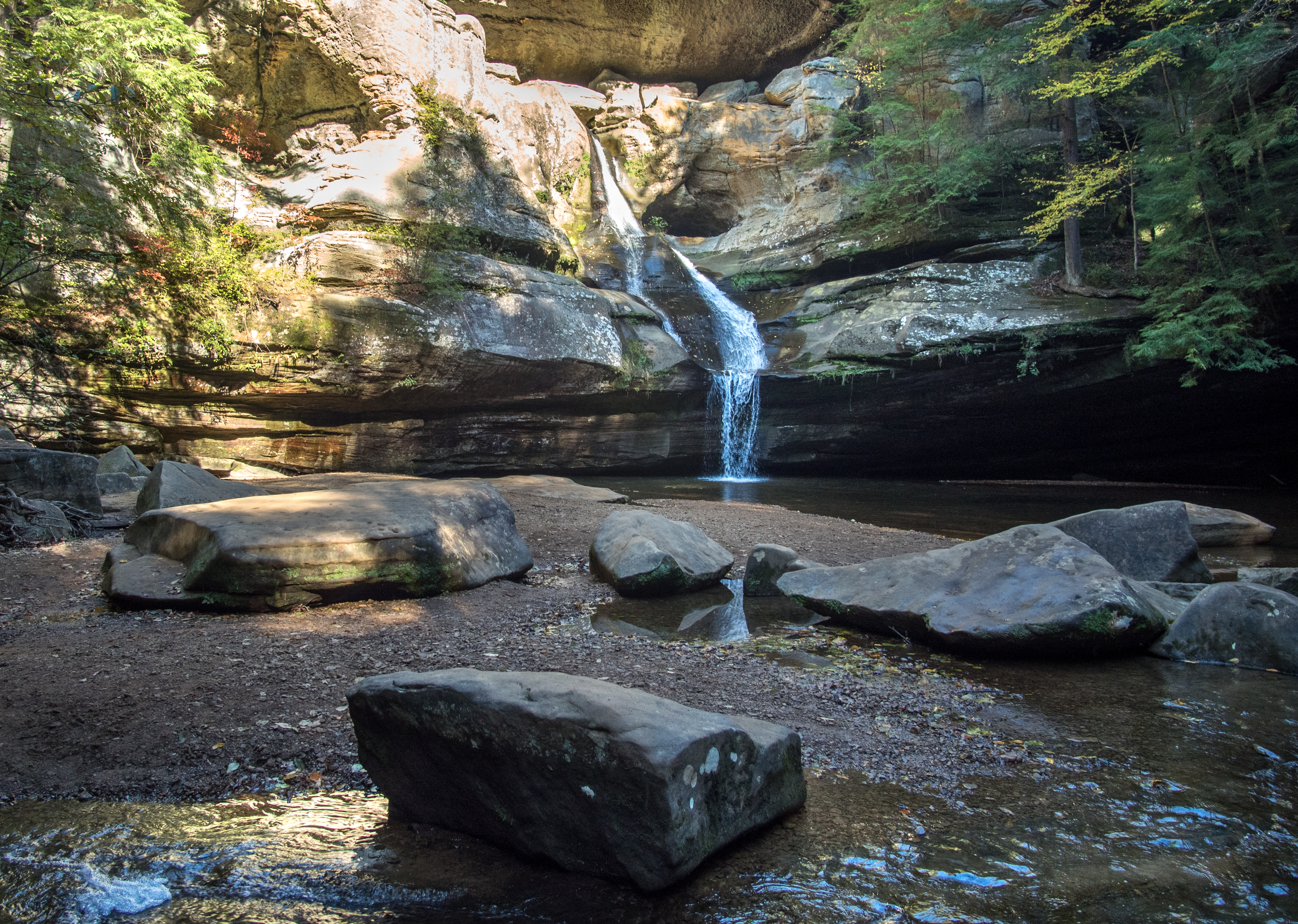
Cedar Falls

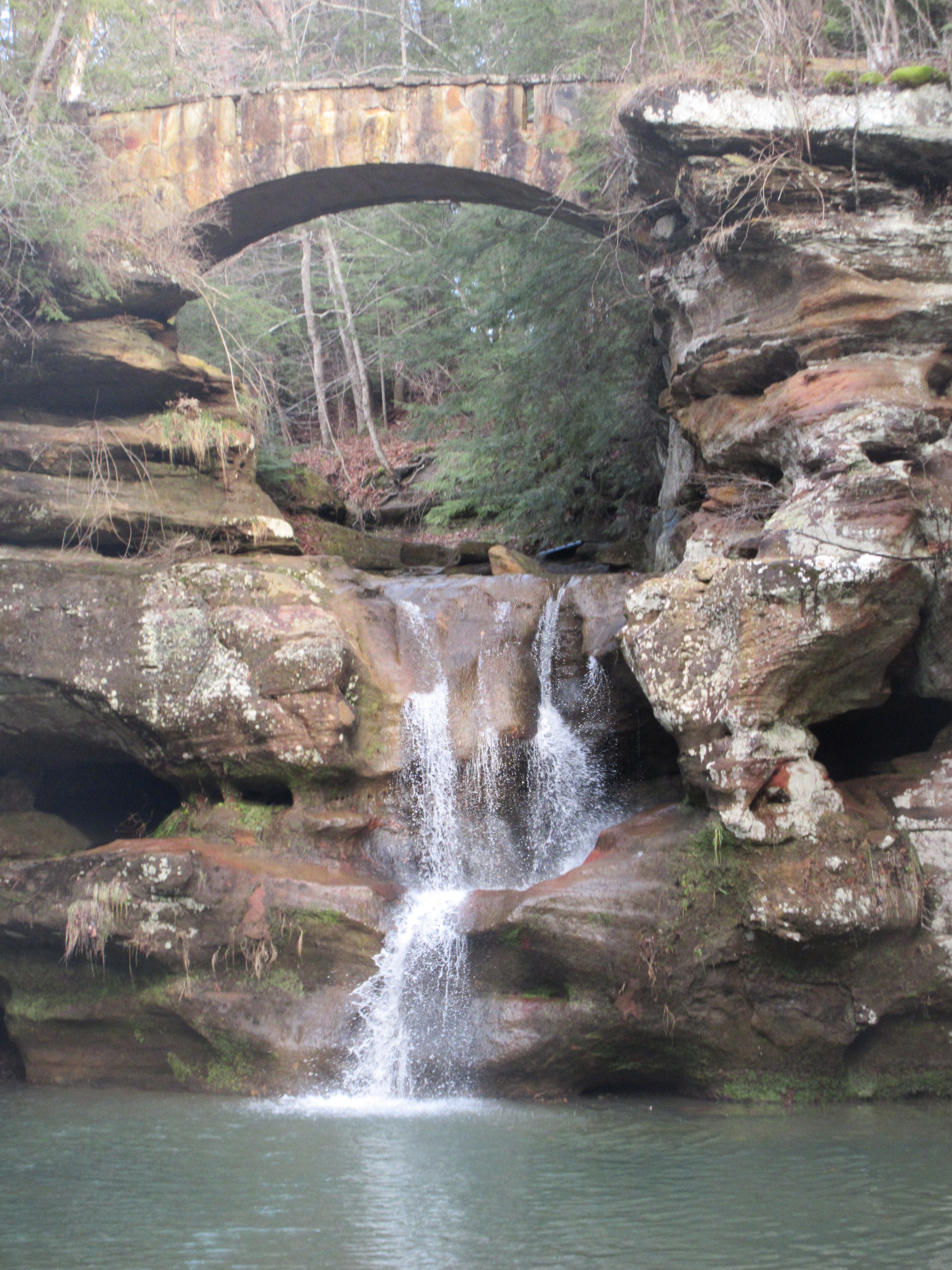
Upper Falls at Old Man's Cave

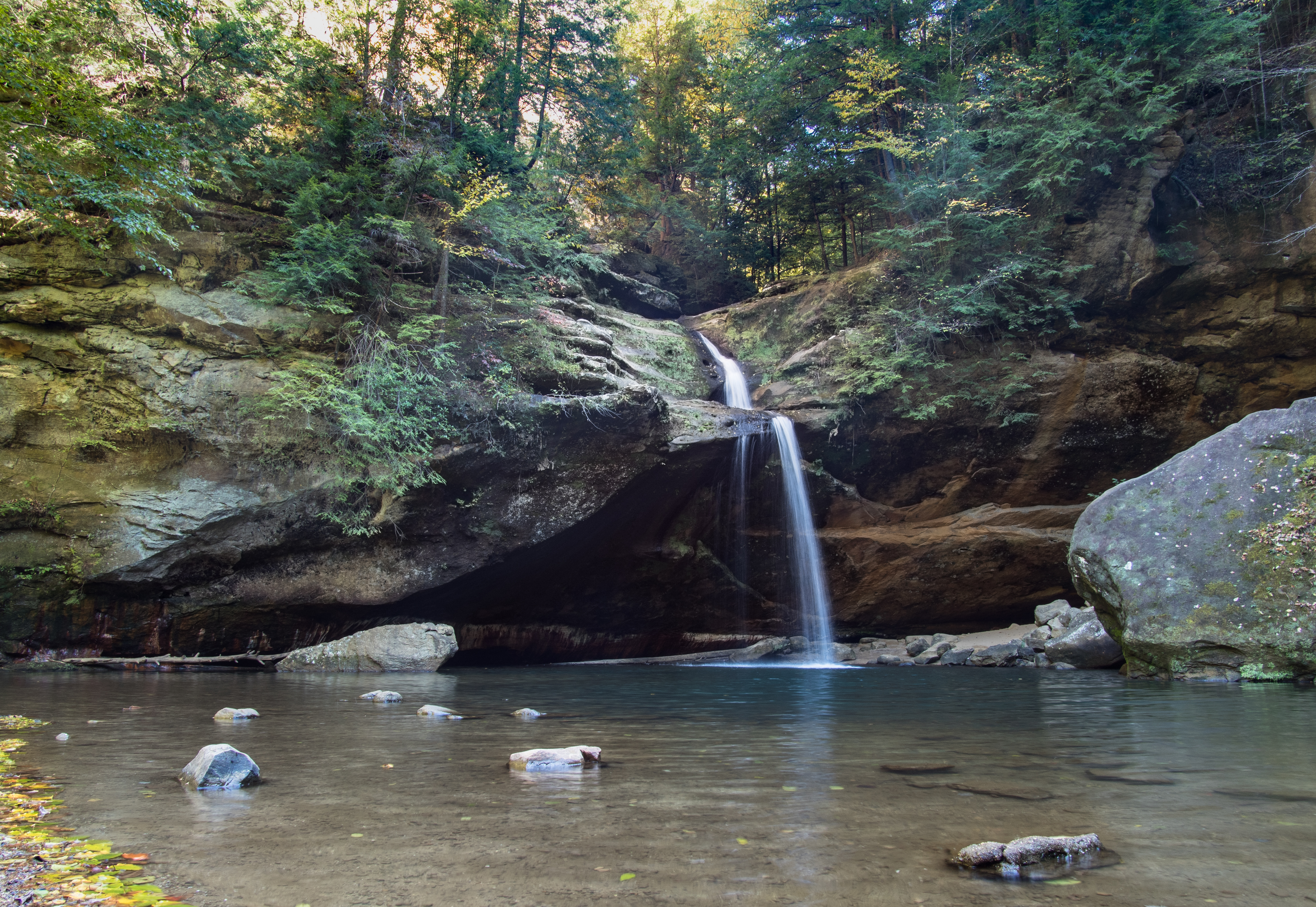
Lower Falls at Old Man's Cave

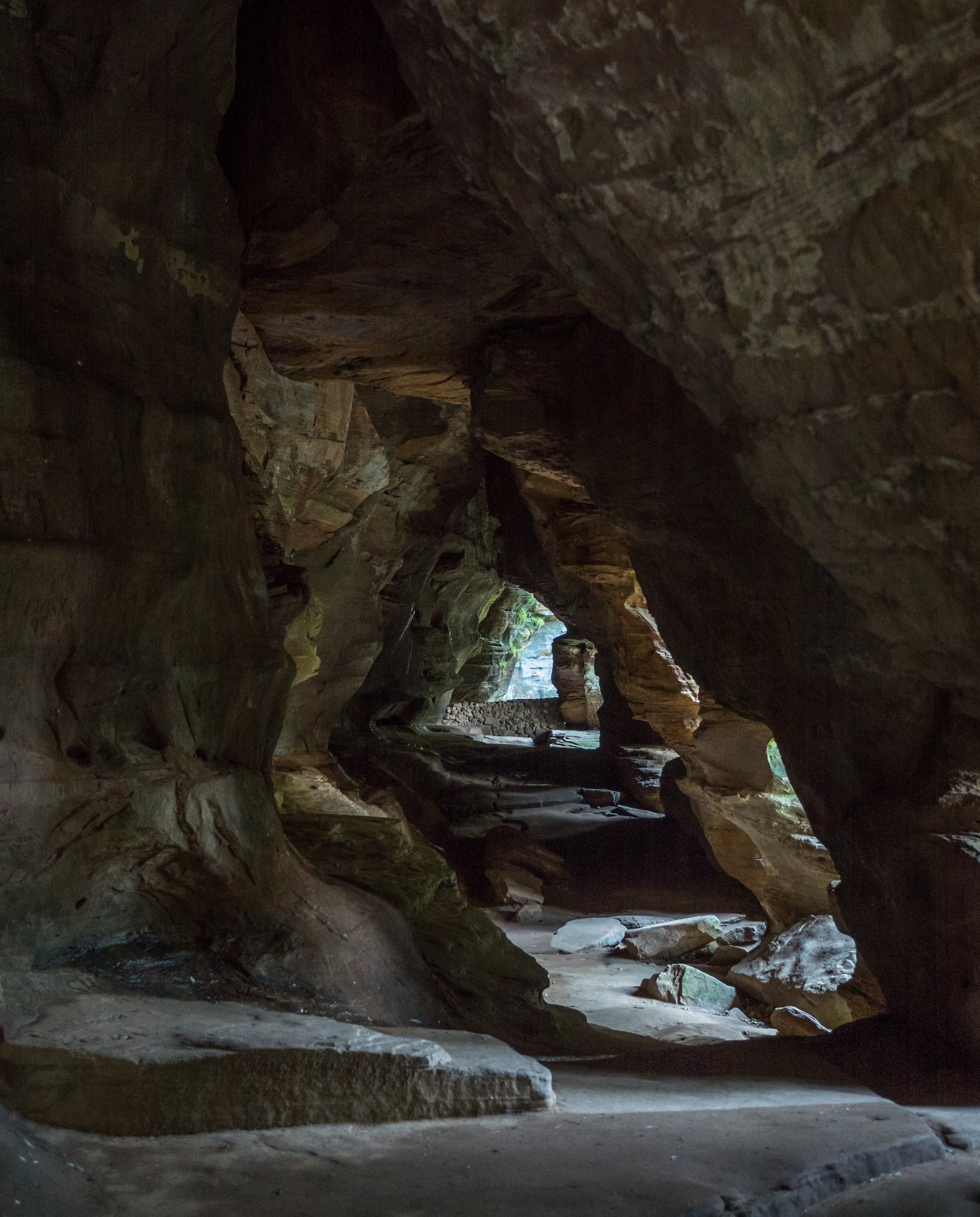
View inside Rock House

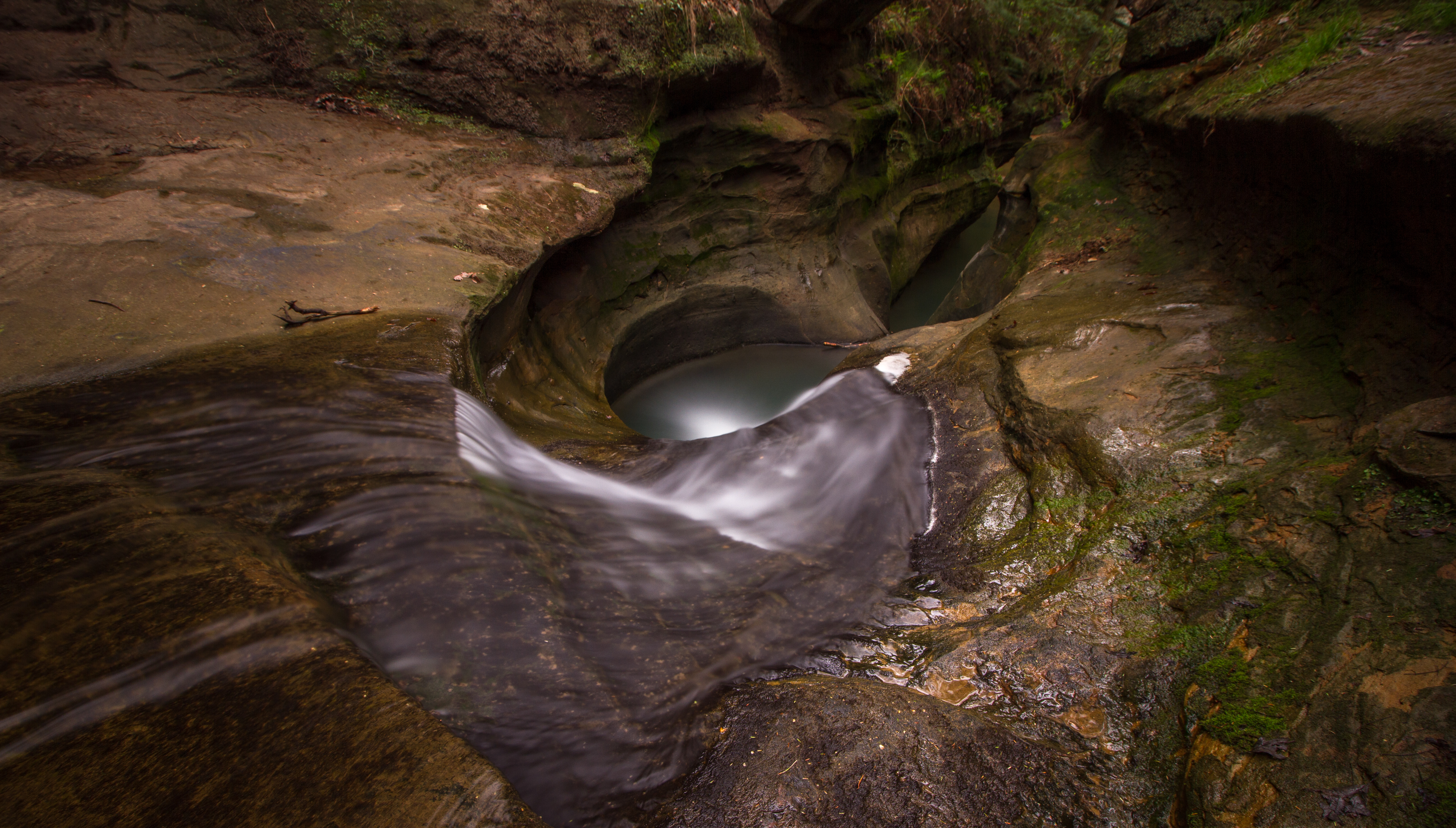
The Devil's Bathtub near Old Man's Cave

== See also ==
- Appalachian Ohio
- Appalachia
- Wayne National Forest
