= Lake Logan State Park =

State park in Hocking County, Ohio, USA

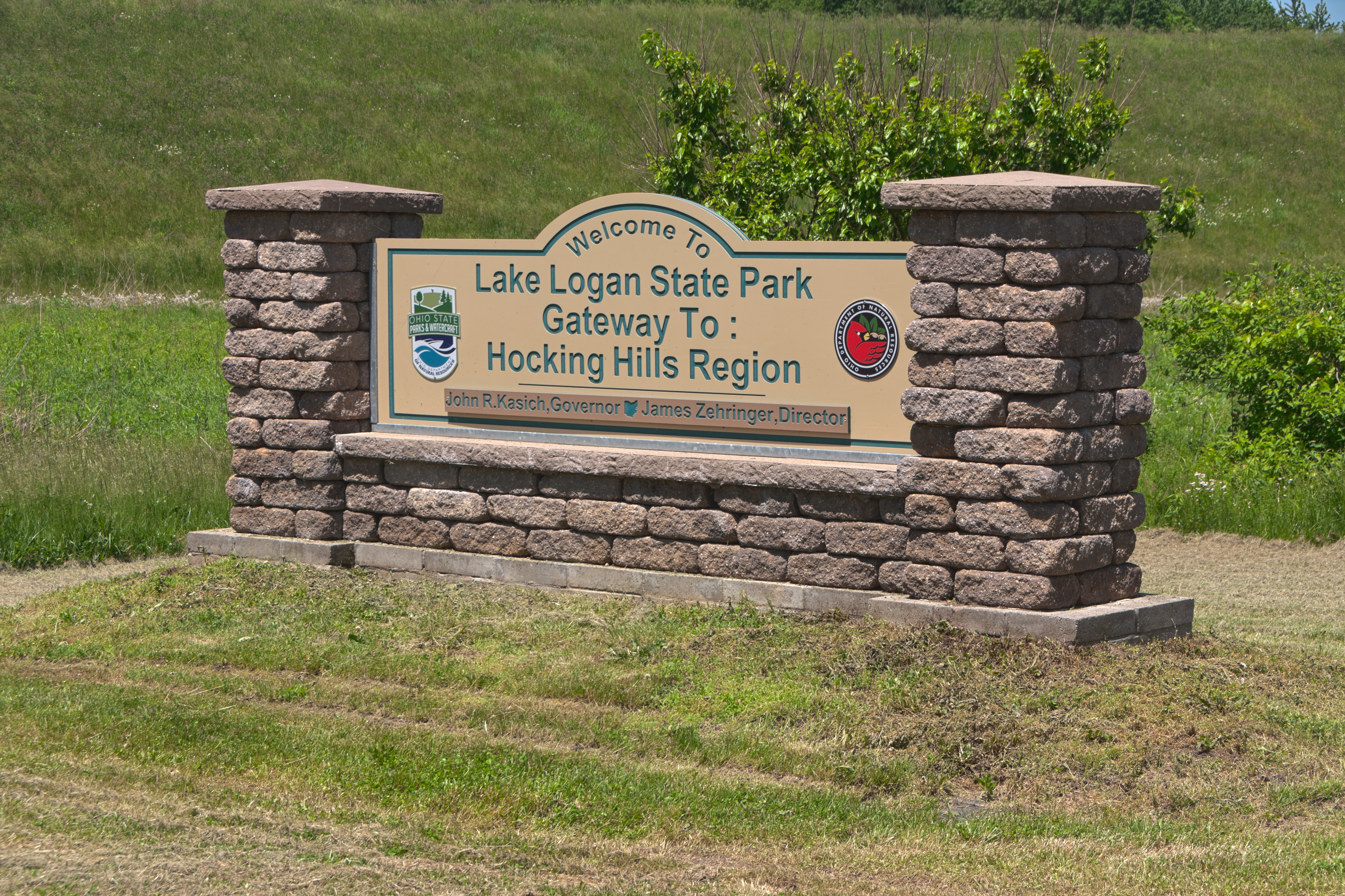

- Location within Ohio Location within the United States
- Location: Hocking County, Ohio, United States
- Coordinates: 39°32′06″N 82°27′47″W
- Area: Land: 318 acres (129 ha); Water: 400 acres (160 ha)
- Elevation: 755 feet (230 m)
- Established: 1964
- Administrator: Ohio Department of Natural Resources
- Designation: Ohio state park
- Website: Lake Logan State Park

Lake Logan State Park is an Ohio state park in Hocking County, Ohio, United States. Lake Logan State Park is located in Falls Township, Hocking County, Ohio. Lake Logan Dam is directly accessible off State Route 664 just southwest of the county seat of Logan. Lake Logan State Park lies in the Hocking Valley, formed by the Hocking River. Lake Logan was created in 1955 with the construction of the Lake Logan Dam on Clear Fork Creek, a tributary of the Hocking River. Lake Logan is a 400-acre (160 ha) lake and is open to fishing, boating, ice fishing, ice boating and swimming.

== Early history ==
The Wyandot people inhabited the area at the arrival of Anglo-Americans. The city of Logan was established by Ohio Governor Thomas Worthington in 1816. Residents named the town in honor of Chief Logan of the Mingo Indian tribe.

Iron ore was discovered in southern Ohio in the mid-19th century. The iron industry was of great importance in the Hanging Rock region during the American Civil War, with 46 furnaces being in production at its peak, and the state of Ohio being the leading producer of iron for the Union. Iron production declined in the Hocking Valley area in the years following the Civil War.

The departure of the mining industries allowed the stripped forests to regenerate. Lake Logan State Park is now home to a second growth forest. This rebirth has led to the establishment of the state park. A dam was built on Clear Fork Creek, a tributary of the Hocking River creating Lake Logan in 1955.

== Lake Logan ==
Lake Logan was created with the construction of Lake Logan Dam in 1955. Upon completion of the Dam the area was administered by the Ohio Department of Natural Resources (ODNR) Division of Wildlife. Lake Logan Dam feeds Clear Fork Creek, a tributary of the Hocking River. The lake was originally known as Hocking Lake but was later re-named Lake Logan, which avoided confusion with Hocking Hills State Park located just miles away to the south east. The 400-acre (160 ha) lake contains many different kinds of fish. The new name also acknowledged the Native American heritage of the region. A valid Ohio Fishing license is required to fish in Lake Logan.

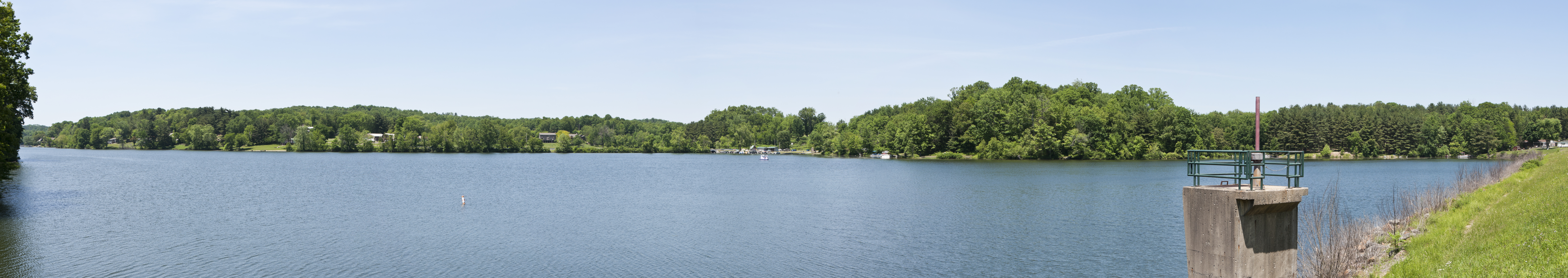
A panorama of Lake Logan

== Recreation ==
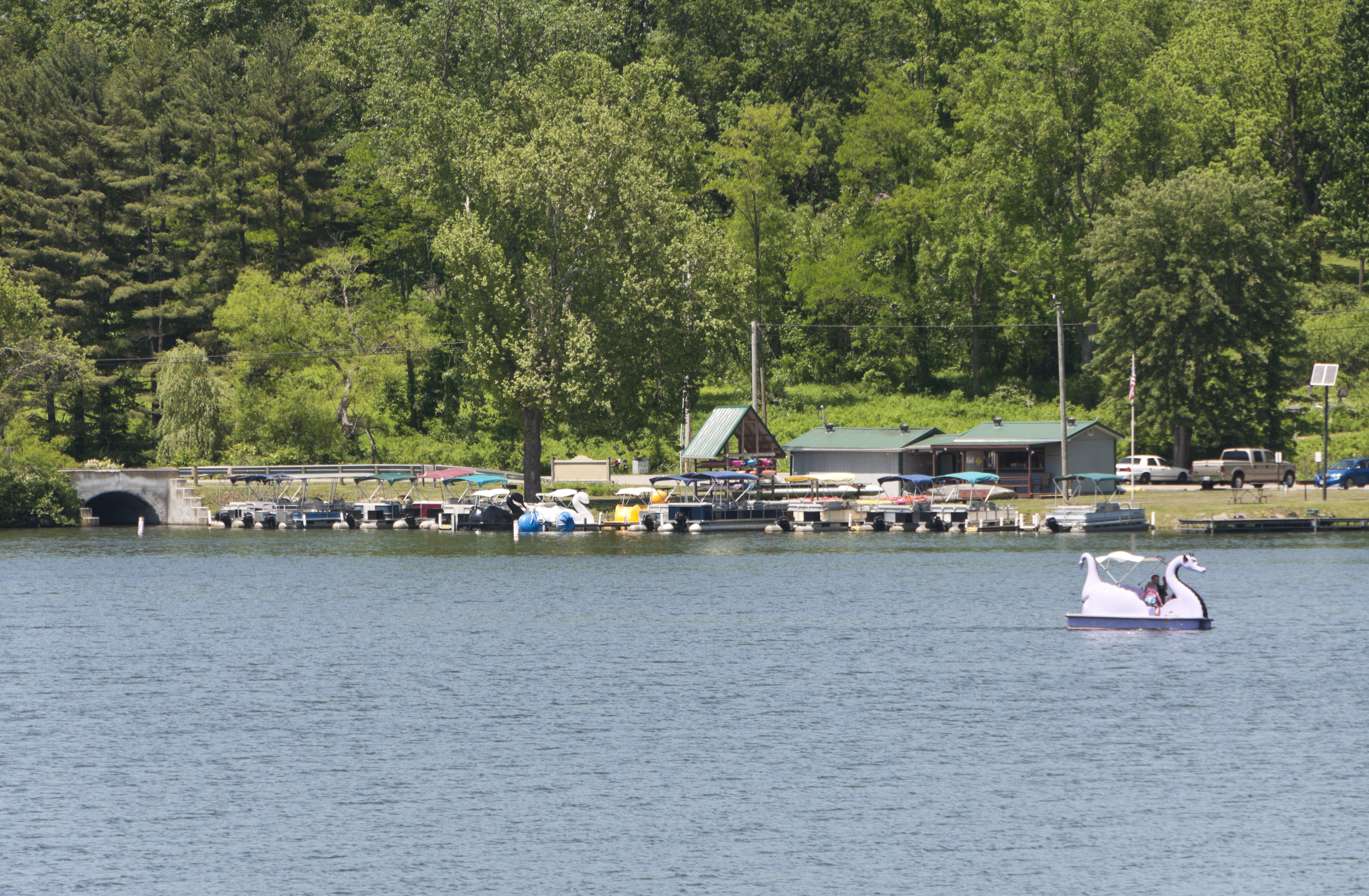
Lake Logan Marina

Lake Logan State Park is open for year-round recreation. Lake Logan is open for fishing and ice fishing, with possession of a valid Ohio Fishing License. Swimming and boating with boats of up to a 10 horsepower limit is also available. Game fish are stocked in Lake Logan by the State of Ohio, Division of Wildlife.

Many opportunities for birding at Lake Logan State Park exist throughout the year with visitors that change with the seasons and migratory patterns.

The lake is open to swimming at the 527-foot (161 m) public swimming beaches located on the north shore of Lake Logan. There are also three marked trails, six facilities for picnicking and two boat launch ramps with a marina on the north shore of the lake with boats of up to 10 horsepower available to rent.

== Ecology ==
Lake Logan State Park is located in Ohio's Unglaciated Allegheny Plateau region. Hocking River and its tributaries greatly impact the ecology and landscape. The effects of glacial meltwater can be seen on the landscape. The forest surrounding Lake Logan is mostly an Oak–hickory forest. Both White and Black oak, Tuliptree(Liriodendron), Shagbark hickory (Carya ovata) and Pignut hickory (Carya glabra) are the dominant species. Ground cover includes a variety of different wildflowers, shrubs, ferns and fungi.

A variety of animals including a variety of mammals, reptiles and amphibians are found in Lake Logan State Park. These animals are protected from hunting in the park. Hunting is only allowed to the west of the park.

== See also ==
- Hocking Hills
- Hocking Hills State Park
