= Camp Wyandot =

Summer camp in Ohio, United States

Coordinates: 39°35′24″N 82°34′40″W

Camp Wyandot (formerly known as Camp Fire USA Central Ohio Council, Inc.) is owned and operated by Camp Wyandot, Inc., a non-profit youth organization, based in Columbus, Ohio, US. On April 30, 2013, Camp Wyandot became an independent organization and is no longer affiliated with Camp Fire.

Camp Wyandot itself is located in the Hocking Hills region of South Central Ohio. Wyandot hosts resident camps during the summer, as well as user groups and environmental education groups during the spring and fall. It is accredited by the American Camp Association.

== Location ==
Camp Wyandot is located in the Clear Creek Valley adjacent to Clear Creek Metro Park, part of Columbus Metro Parks system. The property consists of just over 120 acres (0.49 km^{2}) of mixed forests, located in a steep valley, with a lake and creeks that drain into Clear Creek.

== History ==
Camp Wyandot was founded as an outdoor summer camp for girls in 1928 by the Columbus Camp Fire Girls. The first summer ran for four, week-long sessions. Wyandot originally followed the decentralized model of camp organization, in which each staff member specializes in one skill and campers choose their individual activities and design their own schedules for the week.

Campers originally resided in large platform tents located North of Clear Creek, in what is presently a parking lot in Clear Creek Metro Park. There were four tents, each housing one counselor and seven campers. Straw tick mattresses were used for sleeping.
