= Hocking Hills =

Area of the Allegheny Plateau in Ohio, United States

Coordinates: 39°28′N 82°34′W

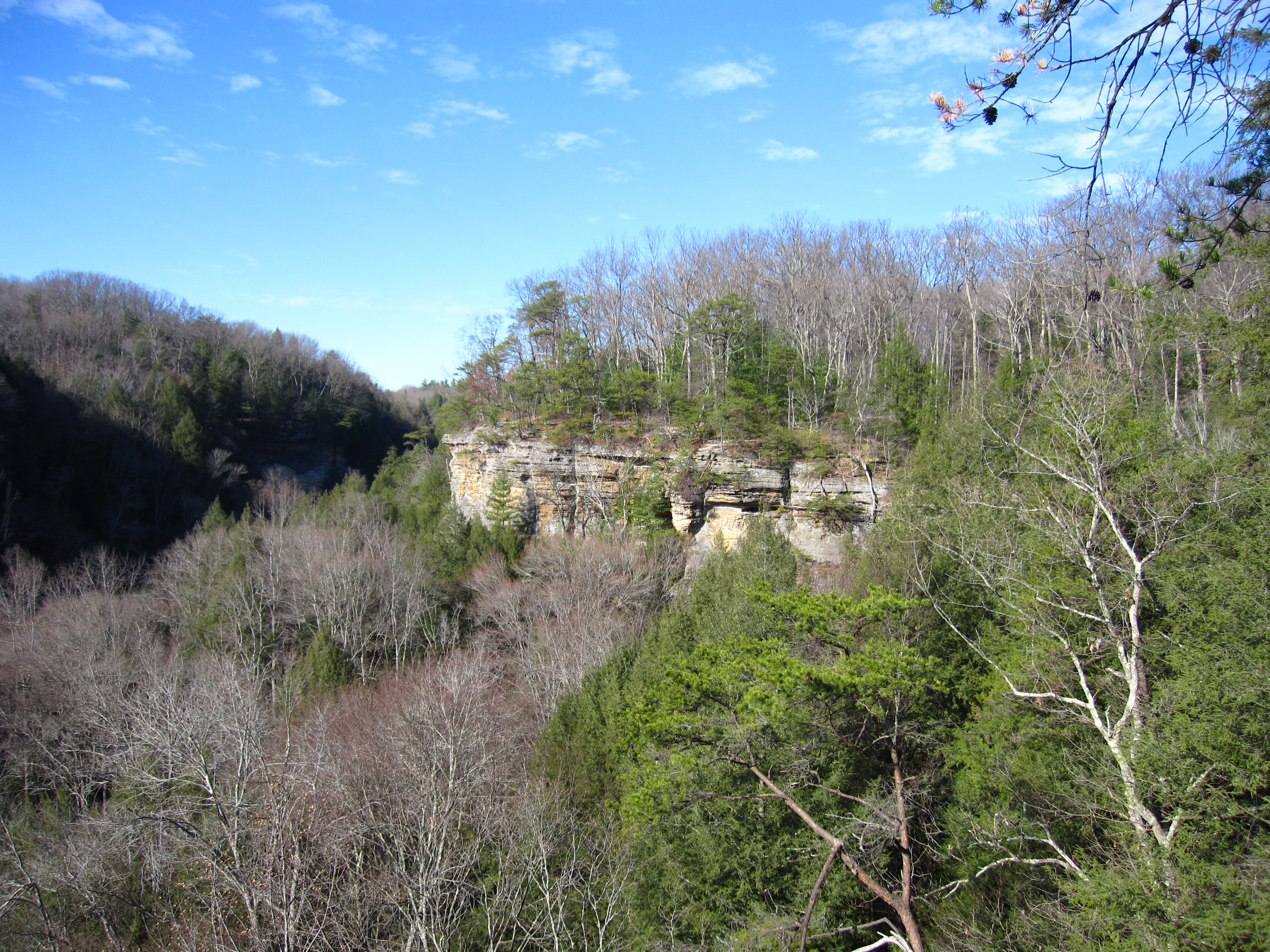
Conkle's Hollow State Nature Preserve

The Hocking Hills region is a deeply dissected area of the Allegheny Plateau in Appalachian Ohio, primarily in Hocking County, that features cliffs, gorges, rock shelters, and waterfalls. The relatively dramatic topography in this area is due to the presence of Blackhand sandstone, a formation that erodes to form high cliffs and narrow, deep gorges.

== History ==
=== Early settlement ===
The Hocking Hills region has been inhabited for centuries by groups such as the Adena culture, Lenape, Wyandot, and Shawnee. Archaeologists have uncovered evidence that Rock House was once used as a shelter and housed baking ovens for native groups, and Ash Cave is named for the large piles of ashes deposited by fires that native people had built there.

The region's name came from the Lenape word for the area's main river: Hockhocking or Hochocen, meaning bowing or bottle-like. Non-native settlers, possibly deserters from Lord Dunmore's War, had illegally settled in the Hocking Valley as early as 1774, but after the passage of the Northwest Ordinance of 1787 and Treaty of Greeneville in 1795 more settlers began to establish permanent communities in the region.

Christian Westenhaver and his family were some of the earliest of these settlers, who traveled from Maryland and built a log cabin in what later became the city of Logan. More settlers arrived in the area, and in 1818 Hocking County was incorporated with Logan as its seat of justice. Over the course of the 19th century, the region's wider economy came to revolve around industries such as agriculture, coal and iron mining, and ceramic manufacturing.

=== Conservation ===
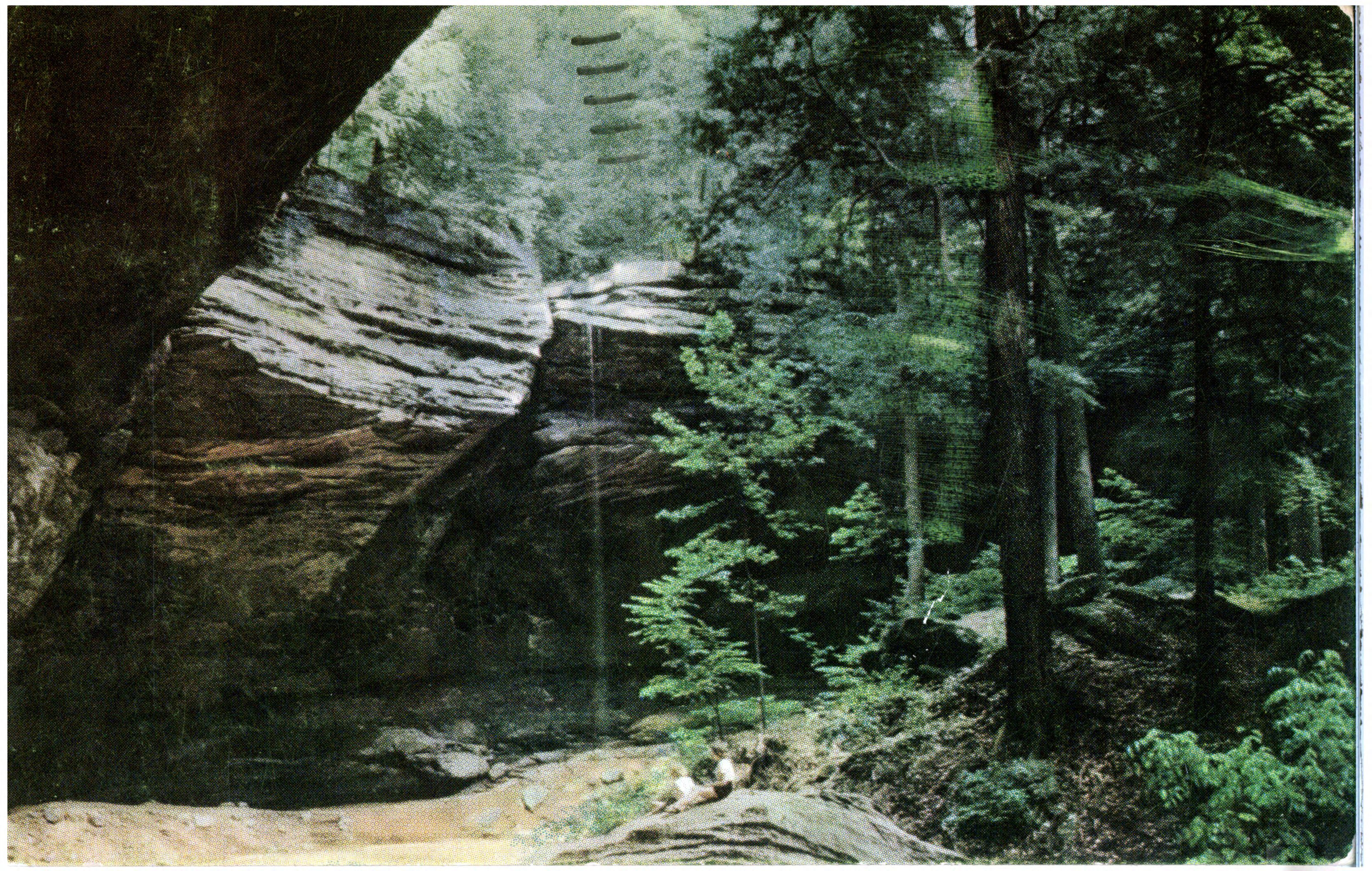
Ash Cave in 1949

In the early 20th century the conservation movement began to take hold and the State of Ohio started acquiring land in the Hocking Hills area to test reforestation methods in regions that had been damaged by farming and wildfires. Over time, the state began to acquire land for scenic and recreational value.

In the 1930s, the Civilian Conservation Corps (CCC) established camps in the region and oversaw multiple public works projects, including significant improvements and expansions of natural sites within Hocking State Forest. Due to discriminatory laws of the time, camps were segregated with CCC Company 505 being composed of white men at Camp Hocking near Conkles Hollow and Company 526 made up of mostly Black men at Camp Logan. Company 505 worked on sites including Tar Hollow, Ash Cave, and Old Man's Cave, while Company 526 completed work on Cantwell Cliffs, Rock House, and Rockbridge.

In postwar decades the area became a popular vacation destination for Midwesterners. In 1967 Emma "Grandma" Gatewood began leading a January hike in the park which continued as an annual tradition after her final time leading it in 1973. The trail she took was named in her honor in 1981. Hocking Hills State Park built its first lodge and hotel in 1970, and that structure stood until destroyed by a fire in 2016.

=== Tourism destination ===
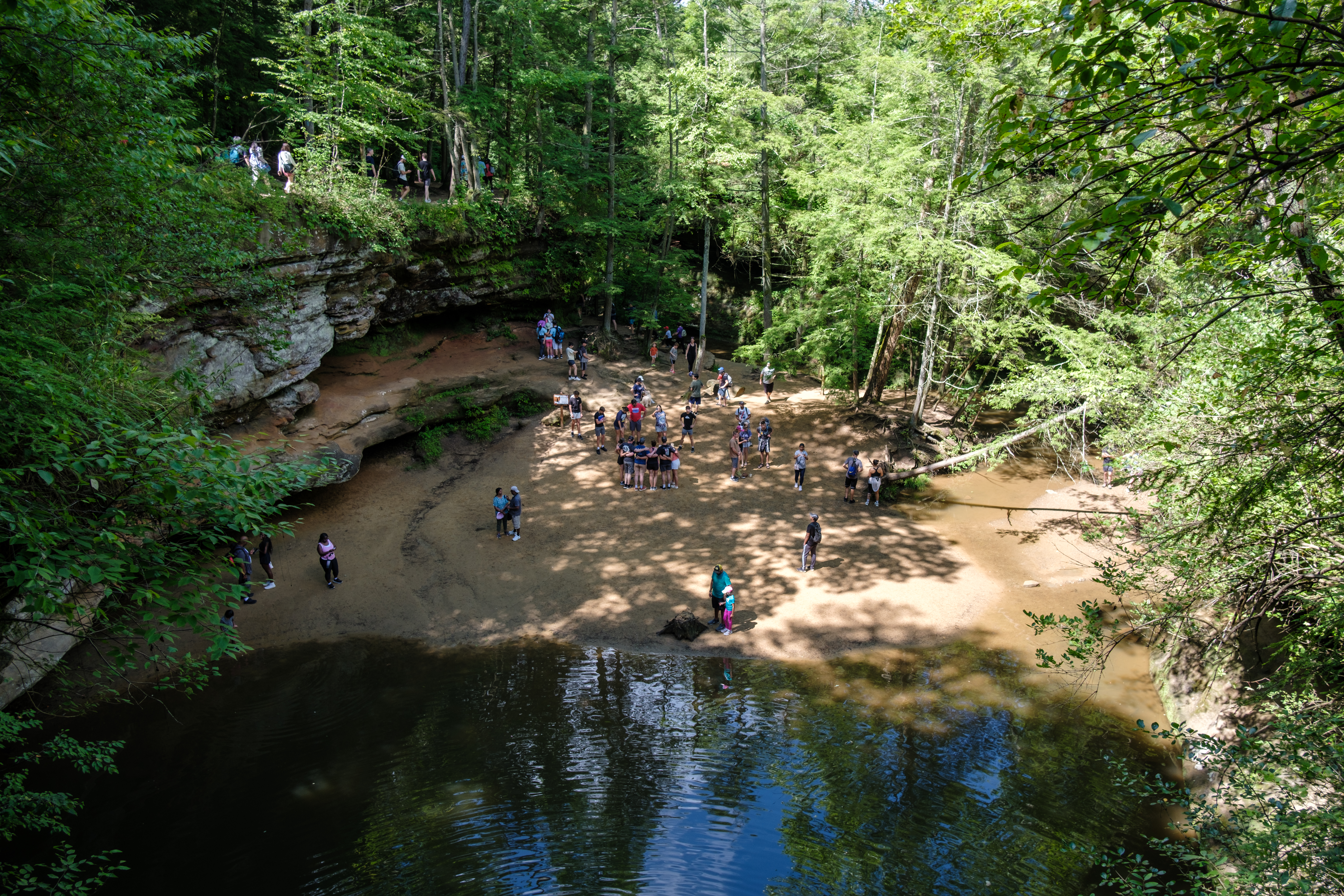
Crowds at Old Man's Cave in 2024

Since the middle of the 20th century the Hocking Hills region was a popular destination for tourists, and over the following decades this popularity continued to grow. The annual Hocking Hills winter hike grew from 140 participants in 1966 to 2,500 in 1973, necessitating a reversal of the hiking direction to allow for more parking. By 2026 the number of participants had risen to over 5,000. Though the state of Ohio does not keep a tally of visitors to its parks, Hocking Hills State Park is believed to be the most popular within the state.

The surrounding region's economy shifted to adapt to the change. In 2001 artisan malls, pottery shops, and souvenir stores opened in Logan and Laurelville to cater to visitors, while at the same time large employers in the area such as the Rocky Boot factory in nearby Nelsonville closed and relocated production overseas.

The COVID-19 pandemic led to a significant escalation in tourism to the region. The pandemic's outbreak initially led to widespread trail closures, but during the summer of 2020 most were reopened with one-directional traffic to allow for social distancing. Logan and other communities began to suffer housing shortages as residential properties were converted into short-term rentals, continuing a trend that had predated the pandemic. When Hocking County regulators proposed the first county requirements specific to rental properties in 2026, an industry group representing lodge owners led fierce pushback against the proposal. The zoning commission sought to require rental owners to have a local contact person and meet basic safety standards in their properties.

== Natural sites ==
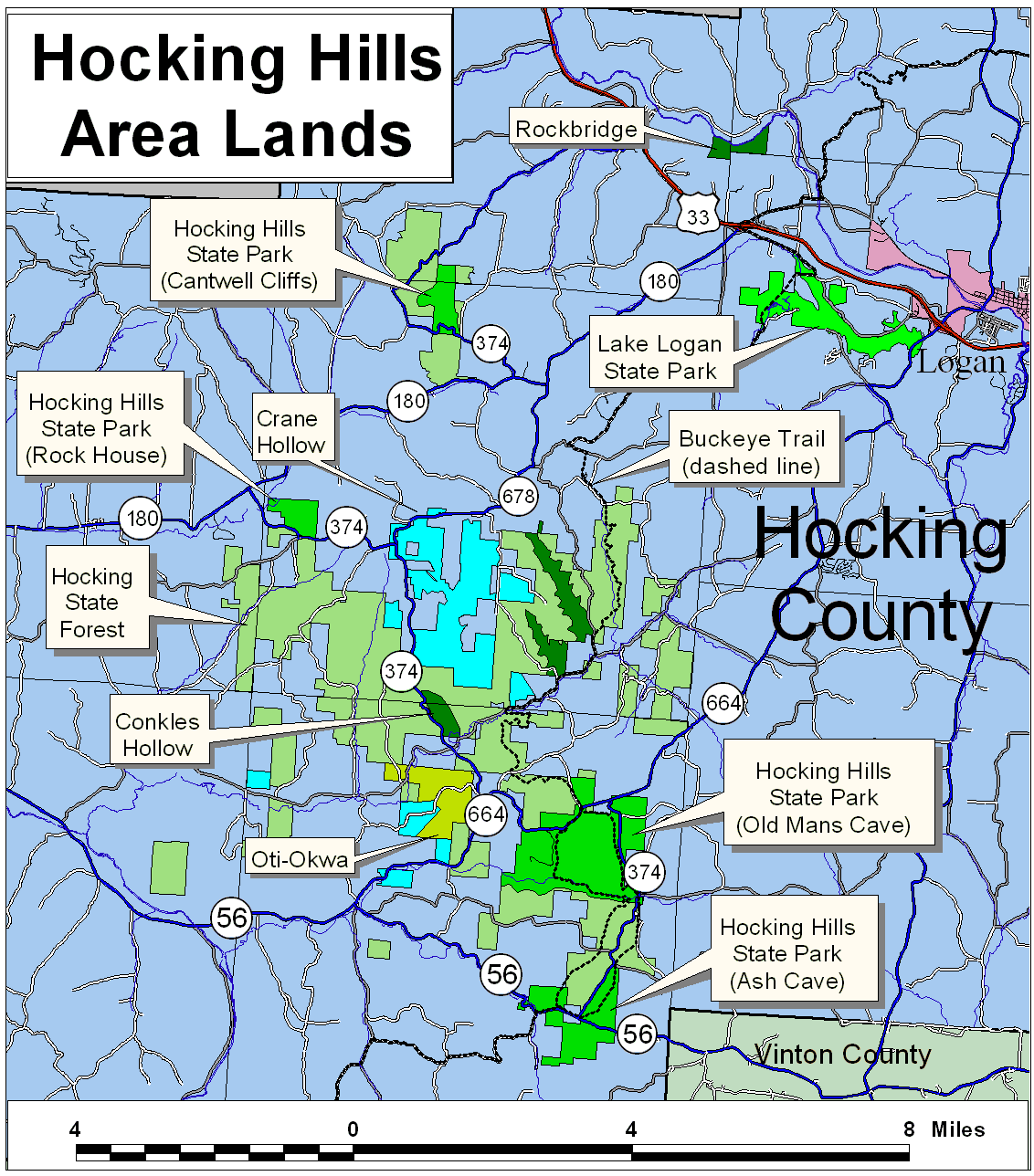
Map of the Hocking Hills region

Many scenic areas of the region are under state ownership, such as:

- Hocking Hills State Park, which includes the following sites:
  - Ash Cave
  - Cantwell Cliffs
  - Cedar Falls
  - Old Man's Cave
  - Rock House
  - Whispering Cave
- Hocking State Forest
- Conkle's Hollow State Nature Preserve
- Sheick Hollow State Nature Preserve
- Little Rocky Hollow State Nature Preserve
- Kessler Swamp State Nature Preserve
- Lake Logan State Park
- Wayne National Forest
- Rockbridge State Nature Preserve

The core area also includes two privately owned preserves, Crane Hollow and Camp Oty-Okwa (owned by Big Brothers and Big Sisters of Central Ohio).

The geological series that forms the Hocking Hills extends south and west, gradually diminishing but still forming impressive bluffs and gorges in:

- Clear Creek Metro Park, part of the Columbus and Franklin County Metropolitan Park District
- Rising Park in Lancaster
- Wahkeena Memorial State Nature Preserve in Fairfield County
- Christmas Rocks State Nature Preserve in Fairfield County
- Rhododendron Cove State Nature Preserve in Fairfield County
- Shallenberger State Nature Preserve in Fairfield County
- Saltpetre Cave State Nature Preserve in Hocking County
- Boch Hollow State Nature Preserve (exposure is along the westernmost edge only) in Hocking County
- Lake Katharine State Nature Preserve in Jackson County
- Blackhand Gorge State Nature Preserve in Licking County
- Liberty Wildlife Area in Jackson County

The Buckeye Trail, along with the North Country Trail and the American Discovery Trail, passes through the Hocking Hills region.

Also nearby are:

- Lake Hope State Park
- Zaleski State Forest
- Camp Wyandot
- Tar Hollow State Park
- Tar Hollow State Forest
- Camp Akita (UCC church camp)

== Climate ==
The region has mild weather with an average rainfall of 40.3 inches per year and an average of about 175 sunny days per year. The average July high is 84.8 degrees Fahrenheit and the average January low is 19.3 degrees Fahrenheit.

Climate	Hocking Hills	United States
Rainfall (in.)	40.3	36.5
Snowfall (in.)	18.2	25
Precipitation days	110	100
Sunny days	175	205
Avg. July high	84.8	86.5
Avg. Jan. low	19.3	20.5
Comfort index (higher=better)	46	44
UV index	5.2	4.3
Elevation (ft.)	776	1,060

== Vegetation ==
The Hocking Hills area harbors a number of rare plants, including Huperzia porophila, the rock firmoss; Botrychium simplex, the least grape fern; Silene rotundifolia, the round-leaf catchfly, and Trichomanes boschianum, the Appalachian filmy fern.

== See also ==
- Appalachian Ohio
- Ohio public lands
