= Clear Creek Metro Park =

Nature preserve in Rockbridge, Ohio, U.S.

Clear Creek
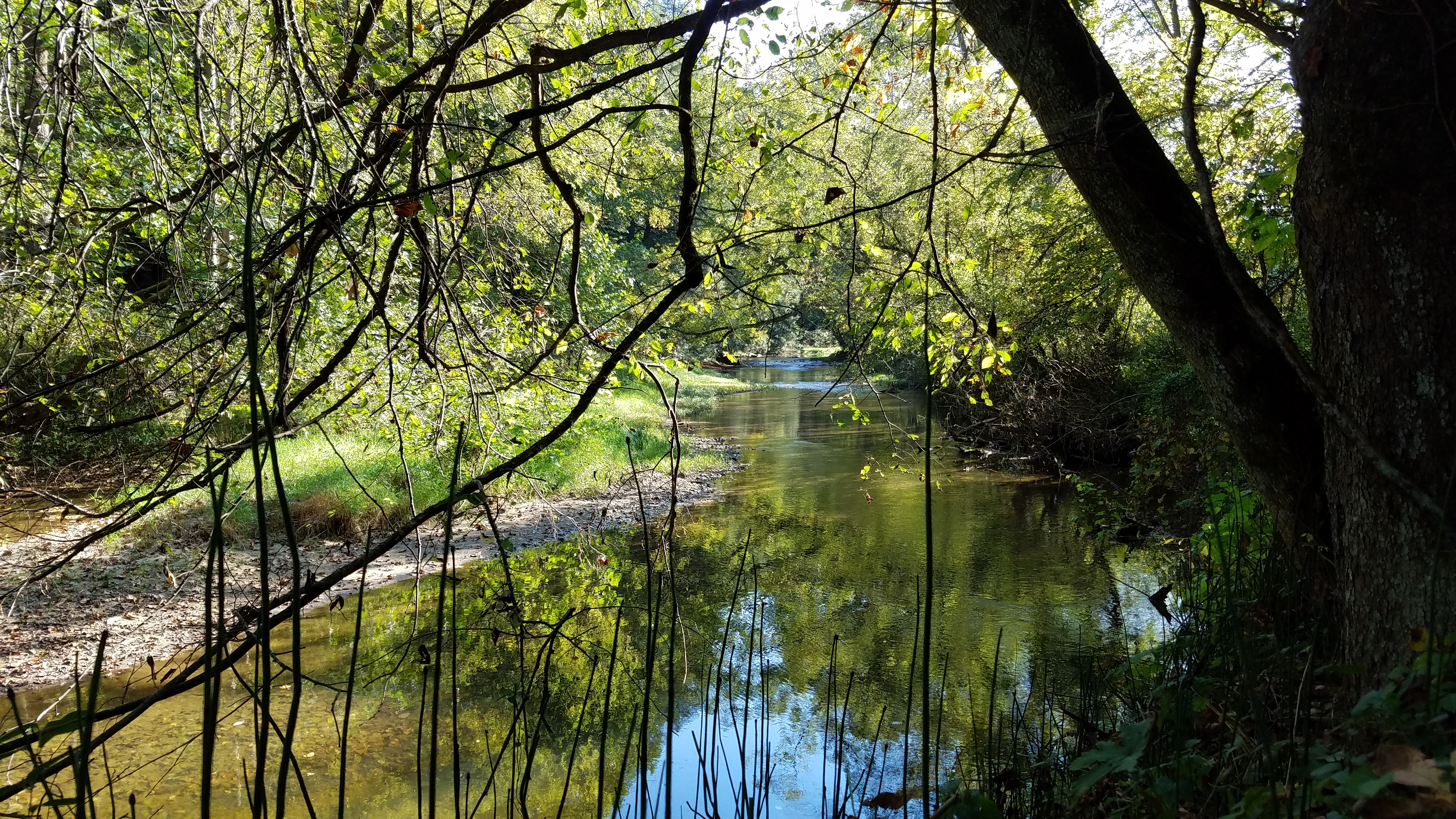
- View of Clear Creek in early fall
- Interactive map of Clear Creek
- Location: Rockbridge, Ohio
- Coordinates: 39°35′52″N 82°32′56″W
- Area: 5,389-acre (21,810,000 m^{2})
- Governing body: Columbus and Franklin County Metro Parks
- Website: Official website

Clear Creek Metro Park is a nature preserve located in Rockbridge, Ohio, just off U.S. Route 33. It is part of the Columbus and Franklin County Metro Parks system. It also contains the largest Ohio State Nature Preserve. Open 6:30 am until dark, the park is home to over 800 plant species and over 150 species of birds.

== Geology ==
Clear Creek is located within the Hocking Hills region of Ohio, with gorges and bluffs formed by Blackhand sandstone. Because it is farther west than most other lands within the region, the erosion-resistant sandstone occurs at higher elevations.

The entire Metro Park area covers 5,470 acres (2,210 ha) as of 2019. It contains the 4,769-acre (1,930 ha) Allen F. Beck State Nature Preserve which has off-trail areas not normally open to the public, except for guided hikes and an annual hunting lottery. A number of trails also leads through most of the park area.

== Activities ==
Clear Creek offers many activities, including hiking, picnicking, canoeing, fishing, nature programs, and a pet trail.

== History ==
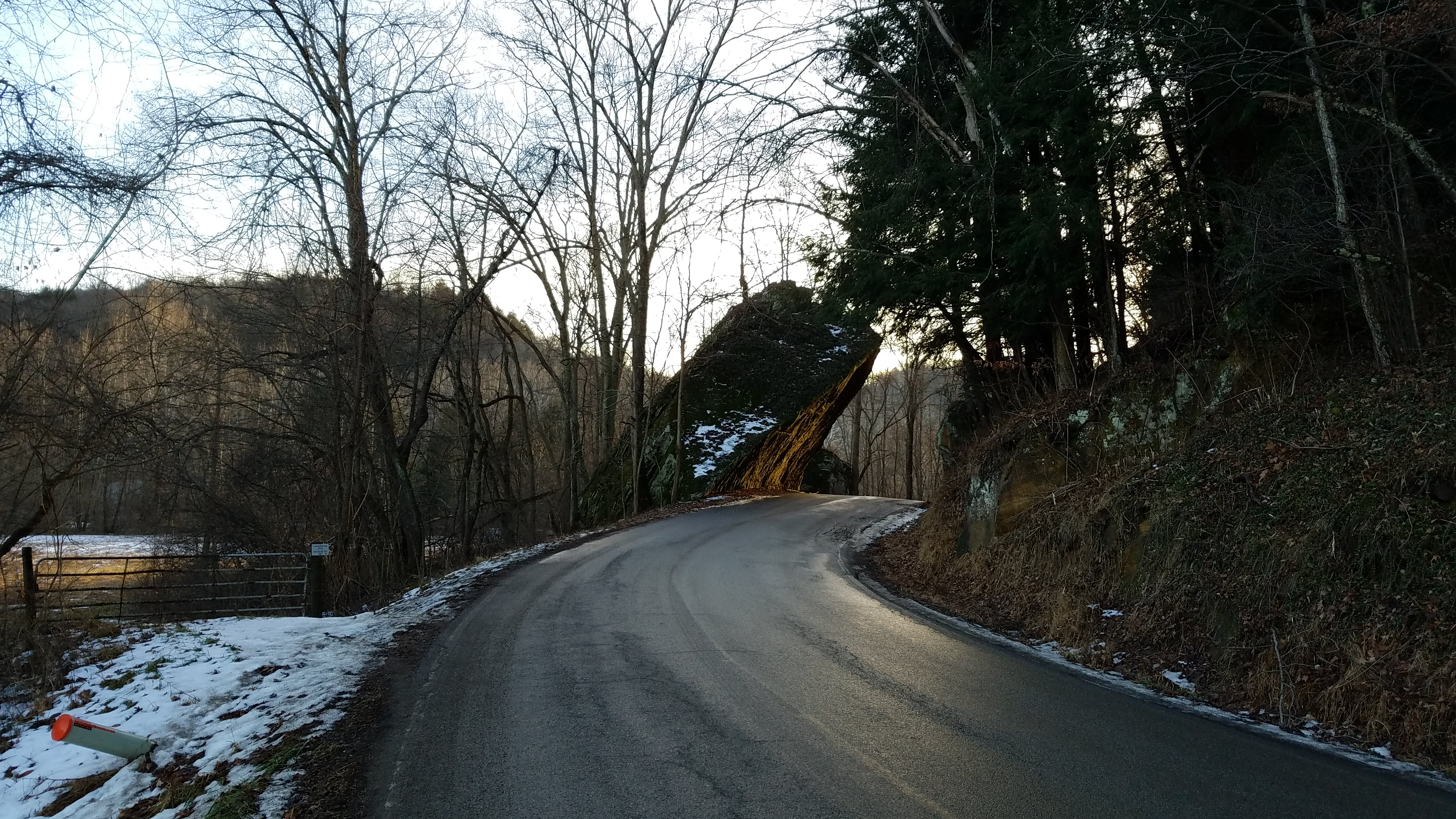
Leaning Lena, a large rock near the park's entrance

In 1973, the Beck family of Columbus, who owned land in the Clear Creek Valley, gifted 1,159 acres (469 ha) to Columbus Metro Parks, with the stipulation that 75 percent of the land should be declared a state nature preserve. At the time, the U.S. Army Corps of Engineers had plans to flood the entire valley and build a large reservoir, and the Becks hoped a large nature preserve could prevent that. Emily Benua, who also owned land that would have been flooded, gifted another 662 acres to the State Nature Preserve in her will, under the condition that it "forever be held as a nature preserve for scientific, educational and aesthetic purposes".

The plan for the reservoir eventually was scrapped, and in 1995, Clear Creek Metro Park officially opened to the public. Metro Parks had acquired additional land for a total of 3,800 acres (1,500 ha) by then (almost all of it nature preserve). By 2019, the parks system had made several more land acquisitions for a total of 5,470 acres (2,210 ha).
