= Lake Katharine State Nature Preserve =

Nature preserve in Jackson County, Ohio, US

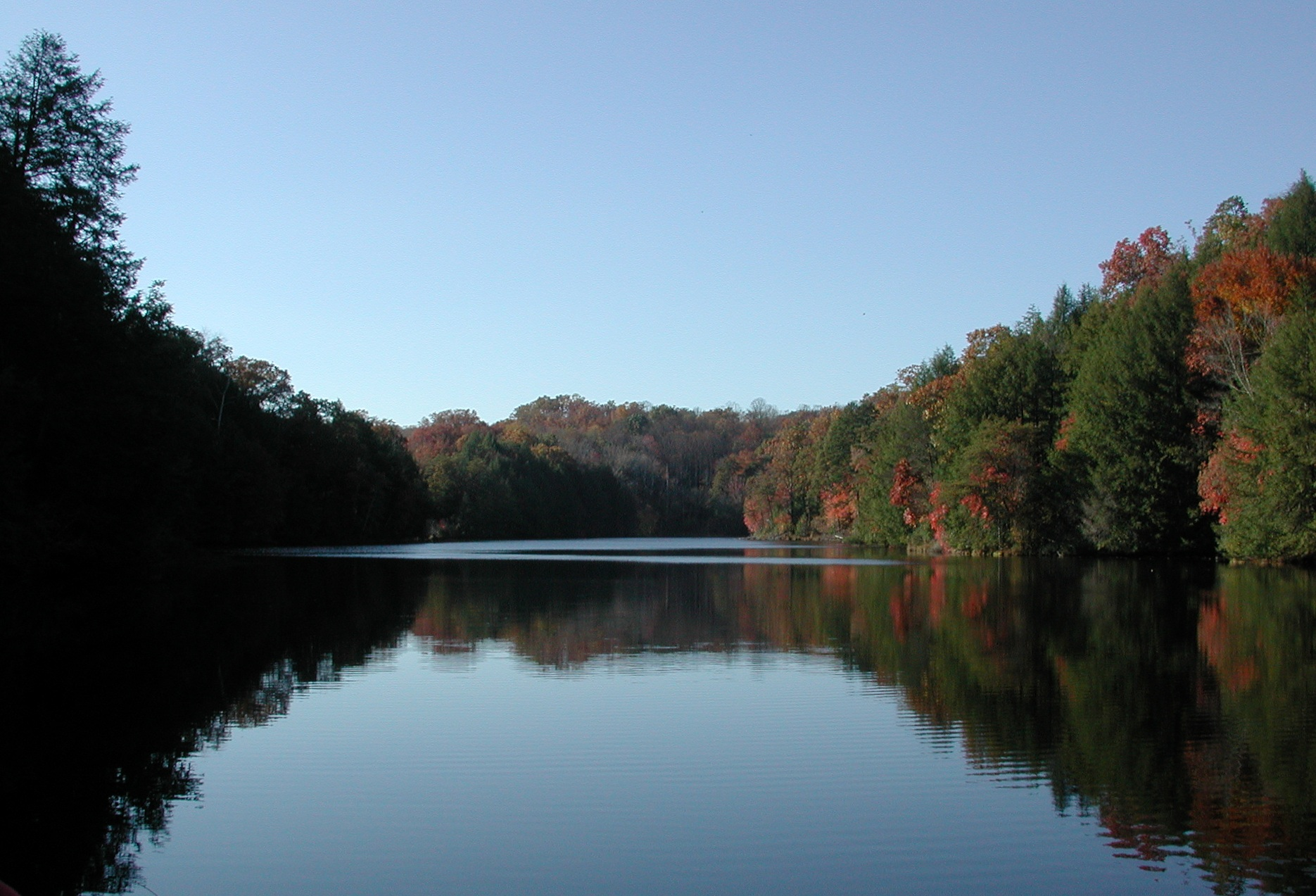
- Lake Katharine

- Location within Ohio Location within the United States
- Location: Jackson County, Ohio
- Nearest city: Jackson, Ohio
- Coordinates: 39°05′06″N 82°40′30″W
- Area: 2,019 acres (8.17 km^{2})
- Established: 1975
- Governing body: Ohio Department of Natural Resources
- Website: naturepreserves.ohiodnr.gov/lakekatharine

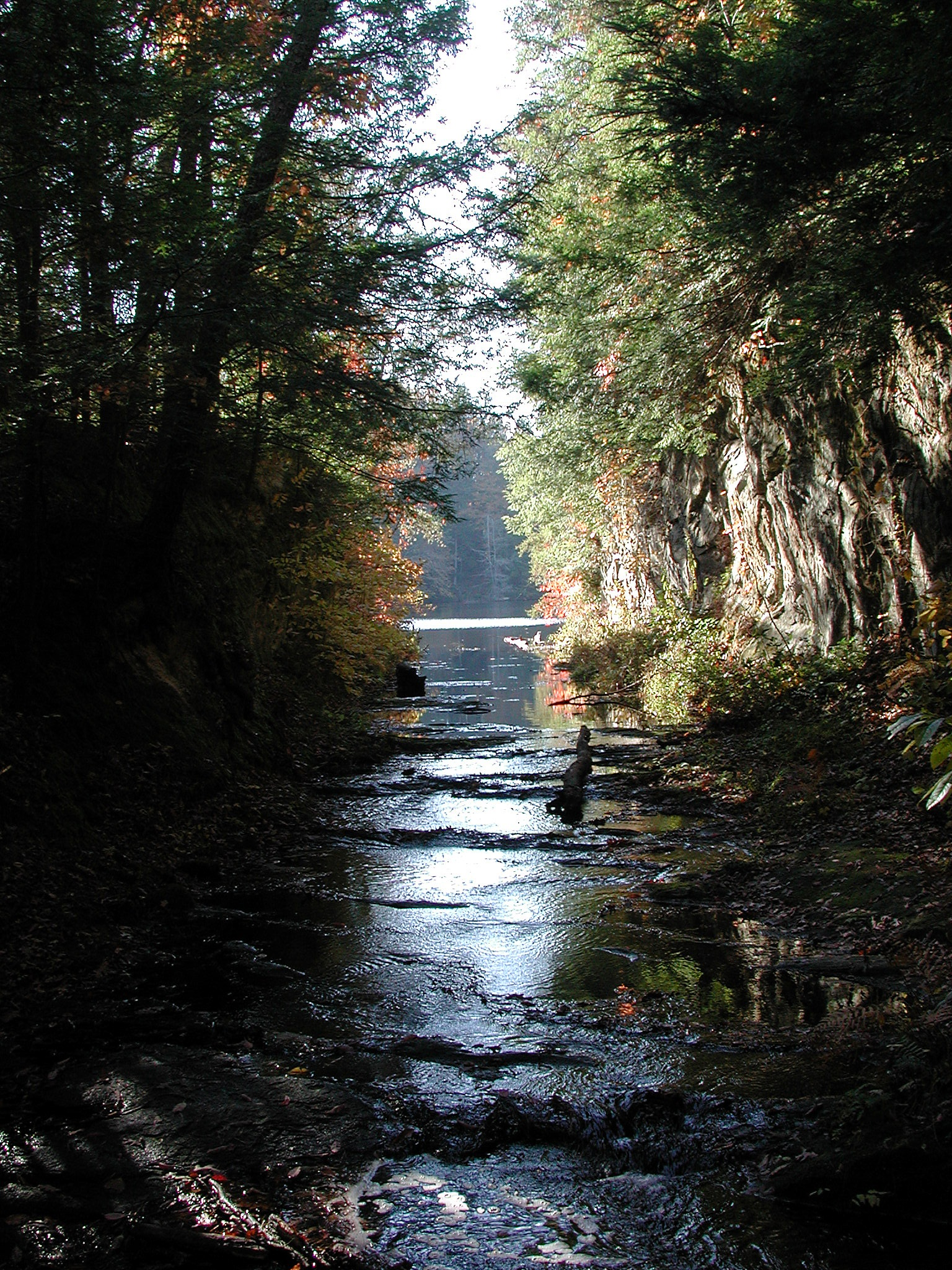
Lake Katharine spillway

Lake Katharine State Nature Preserve is located in Jackson County, Ohio, United States, just northwest of and outside the city of Jackson. It is owned and administered by the State Division of Natural Areas and Preserves and comprises 2,019 acres (817 ha).

The nature preserve is centered at Lake Katharine, an artificial lake. The valley is a small gorge, located in southerly extensions of the same geological series of rocks that forms the Hocking Hills Region. The bluffs are formed of weathering-resistant sandstone, including the blackhand sandstone.

The stream that drains the lake is a tributary of Little Salt Creek, which flows through the eastern end of the reserve.

This nature preserve represents the northernmost extension of some southern species, such as bigleaf magnolia (Magnolia macrophylla) and umbrella magnolia (Magnolia tripetala), but also includes more northerly species such as wolf-foot clubmoss (Lycopodium clavatum).

The preserve features three principal trails, the one-mile Calico Bush Trail, the two-mile Salt Creek Trail, and the 2.5-mile Pine Ridge Trail. Boating is allowed on the lake by written permit only. The western portion of the preserve is off-limits to visitors, and is reserved for scientific research.
