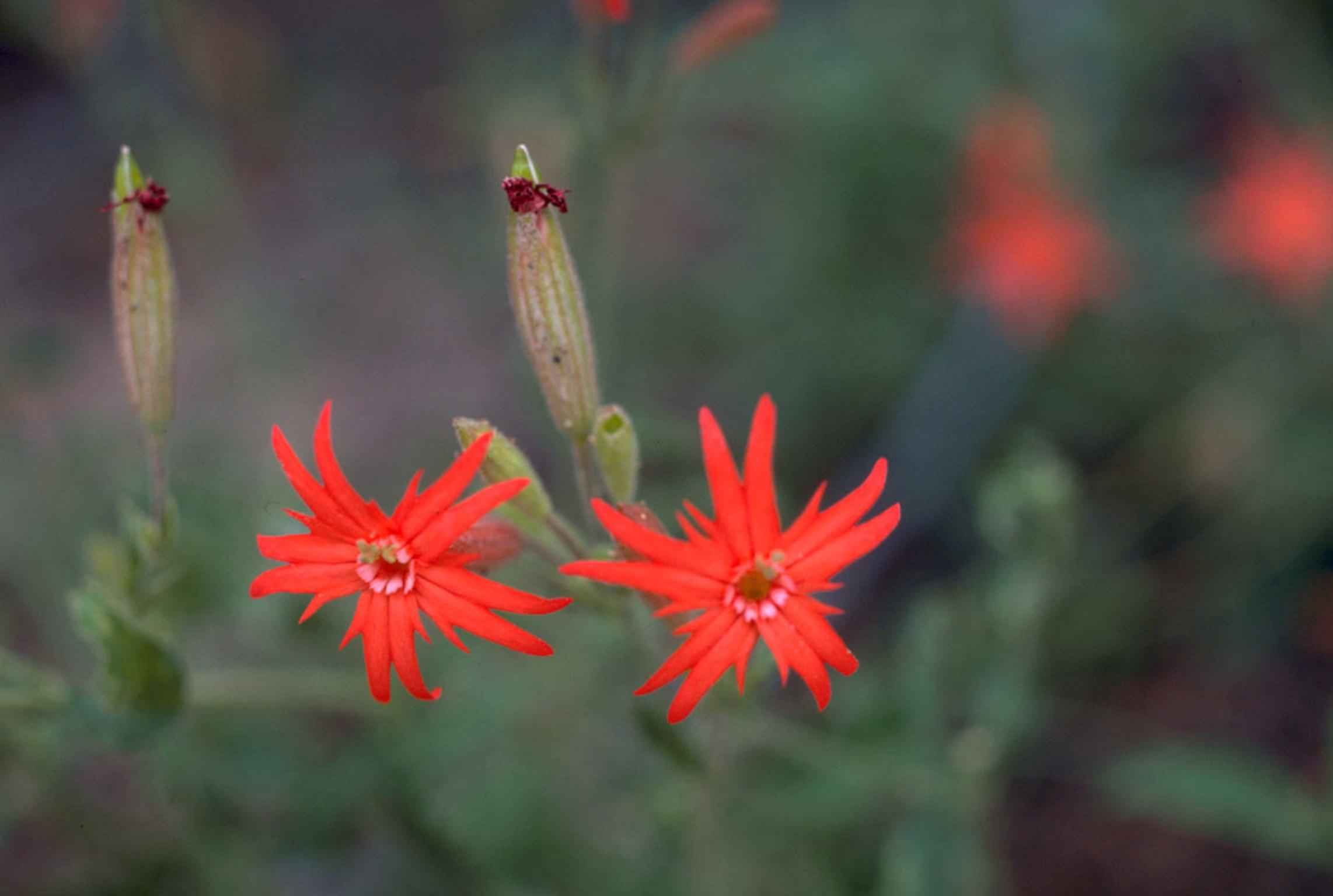
- Flowers

Scientific classification
- Kingdom: Plantae
- Clade: Tracheophytes
- Clade: Angiosperms
- Clade: Eudicots
- Order: Caryophyllales
- Family: Caryophyllaceae
- Genus: Silene
- Species: S. rotundifolia

Binomial name
- Silene rotundifolia Nutt.

Synonyms
- Melandrium rotundifolium (Nutt.) Rohrb.

= Silene rotundifolia =

Species of plant

Silene rotundifolia, the roundleaf catchfly, is a species of flowering plant in the family Caryophyllaceae, native to the east-central United States. A perennial, it is typically found in woodlands to the west of the Appalachians, on cliffs and bluffs. It is closely related to Silene laciniata.
