= Conkle's Hollow State Nature Preserve =

State Nature Preserve in Ohio, US

Conkles Hollow State Nature Preserve
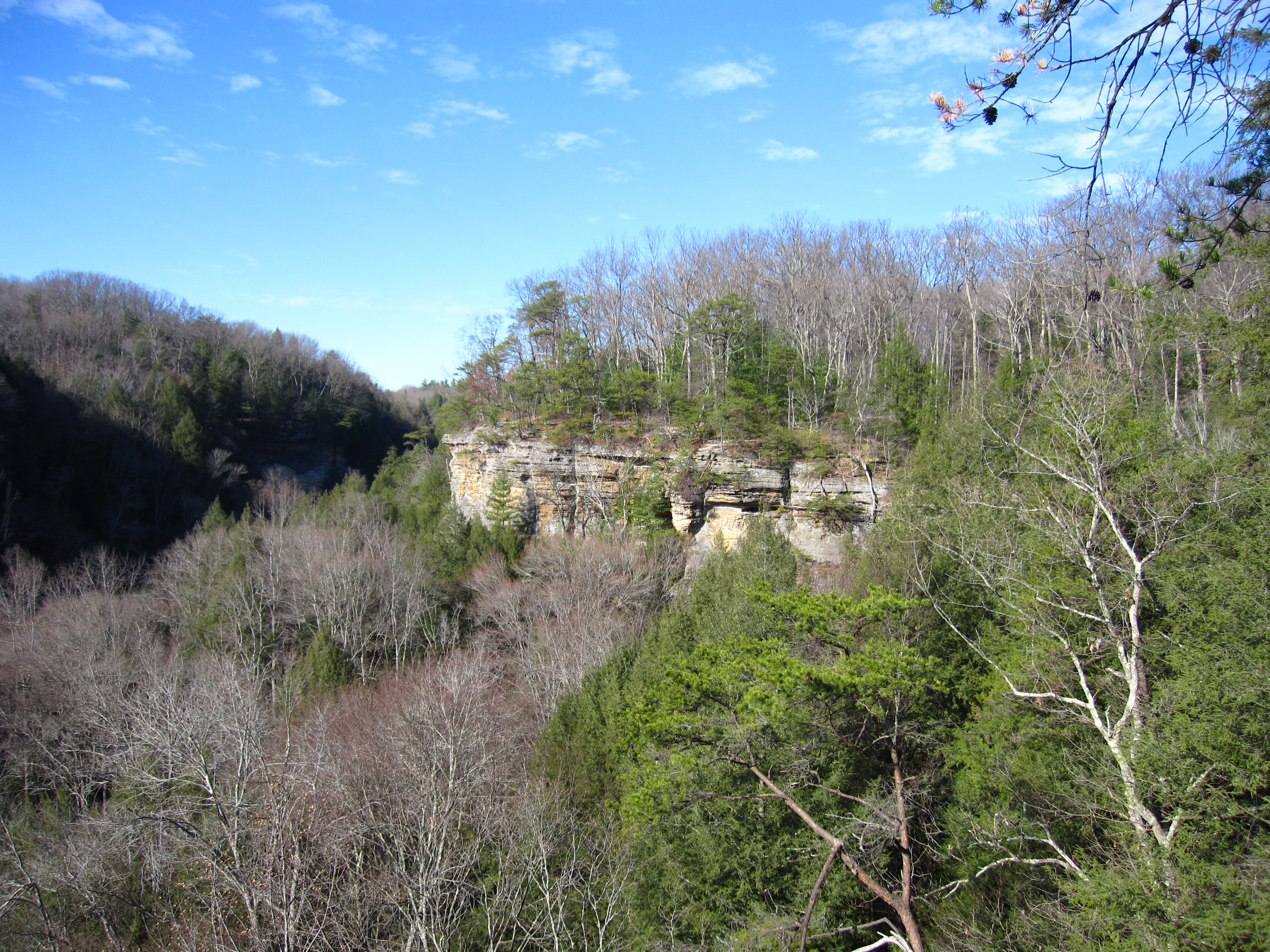
- Cliffs of Conkles Hollow
- Interactive map of Conkles Hollow State Nature Preserve
- Location: Hocking County, Ohio, USA
- Nearest city: Logan, Ohio
- Coordinates: 39°27′17″N 82°34′32″W
- Area: Land: 87 acres (35 ha)
- Established: 1925
- Governing body: Ohio Department of Natural Resources

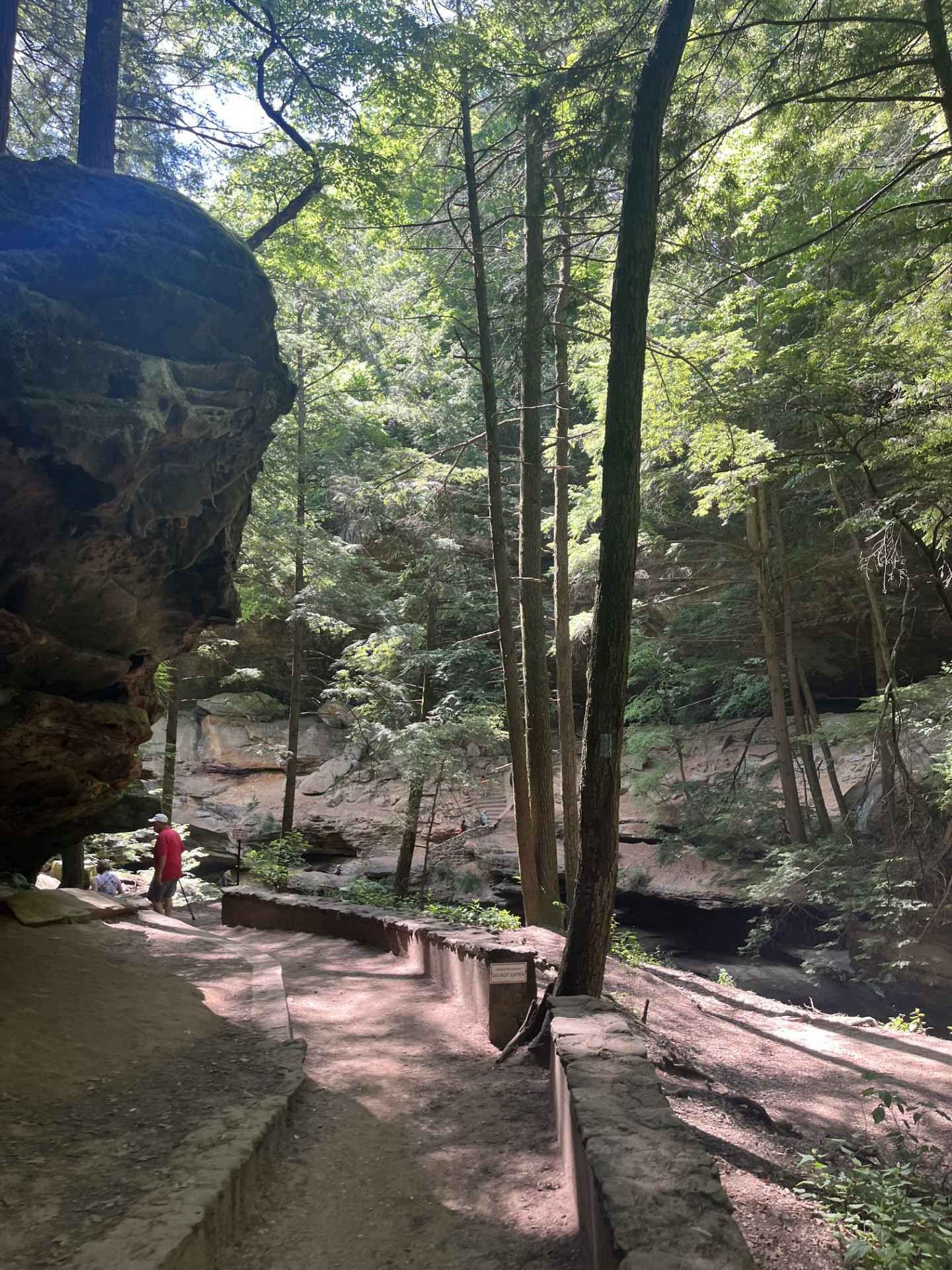
Winding creek surrounded by a walking trail and rocky bluffs that pass through Conkle's Hollow and Hocking Hills State Park.

Conkle's Hollow State Nature Preserve is a deep, cool gorge, which is only 100 feet wide in places and is considered by some to be the deepest in Ohio. The cliffs above the gorge are about 200 feet tall. The valley floor is covered in many species of plants, such as ferns, hemlock, and various wildflowers. It is located within Hocking Hills State Park.

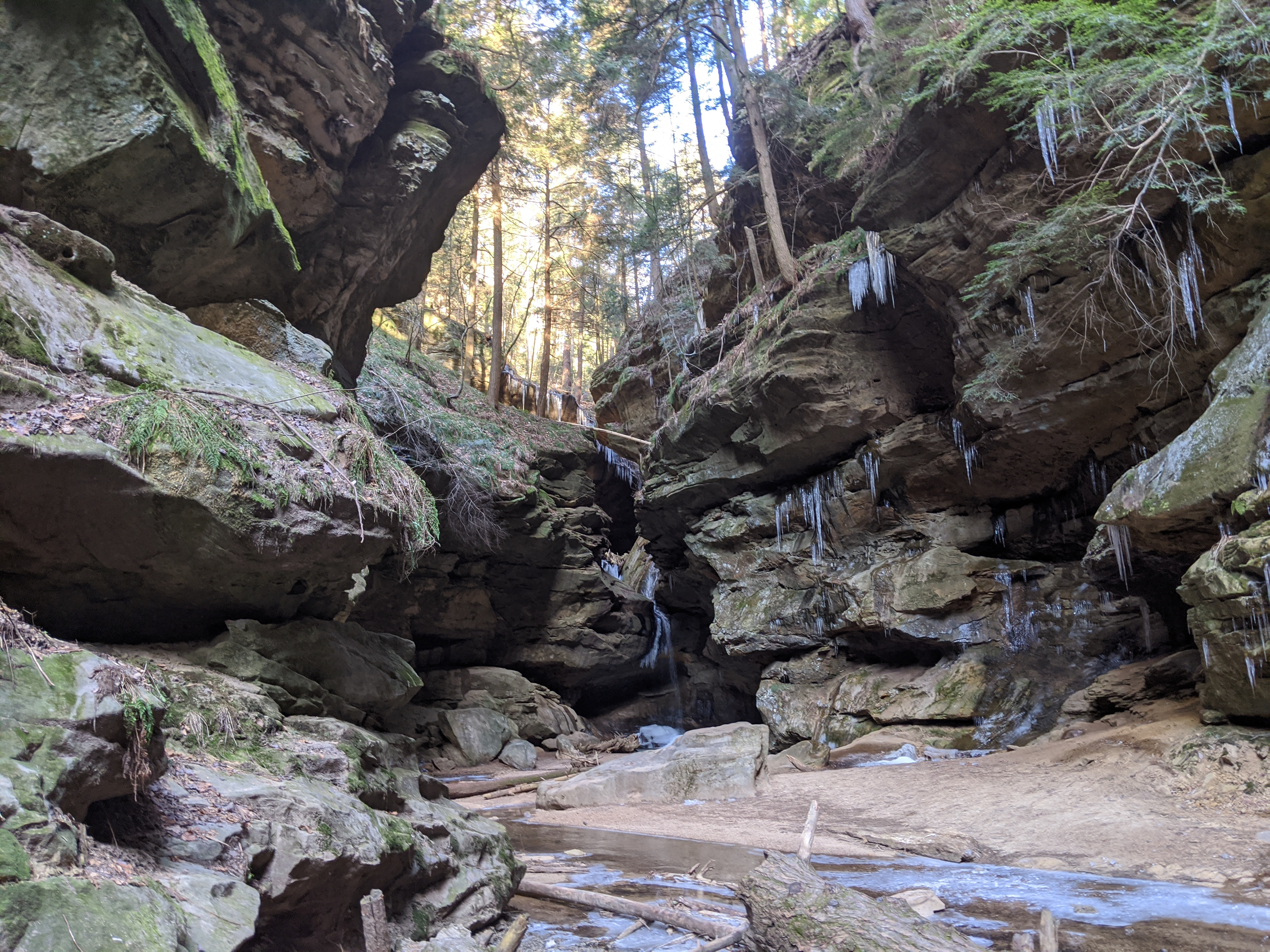
The small waterfall at the head of the gorge

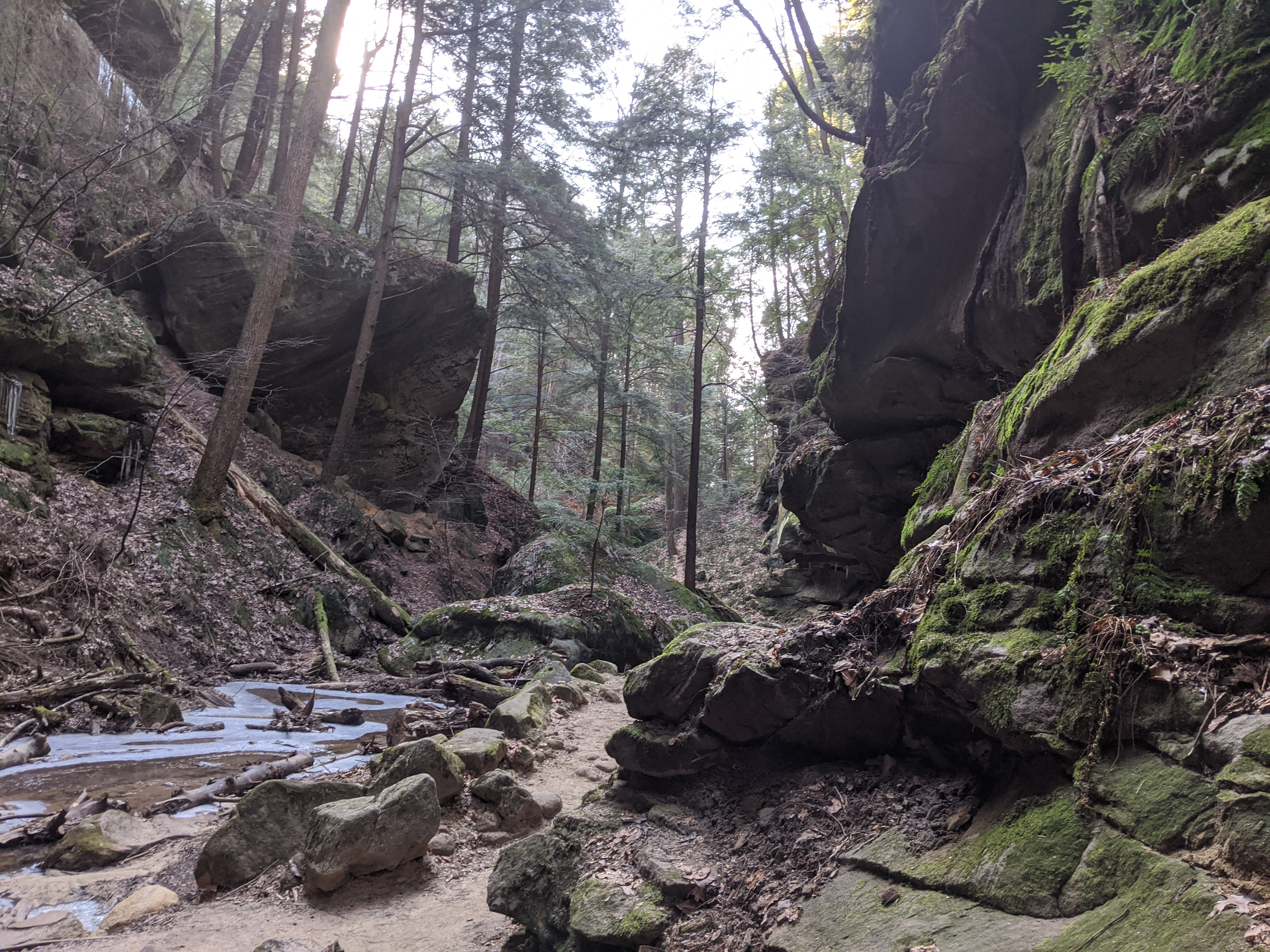
Looking downstream from the head of the gorge

== See also ==
- Hocking Hills
- Hocking Hills State Park
