= List of protected areas of Ohio =

Protected areas in the U.S. state of Ohio include national forest lands, Army Corps of Engineers areas, state parks, state forests, state nature preserves, state wildlife management areas, and other areas.

== Federal lands ==
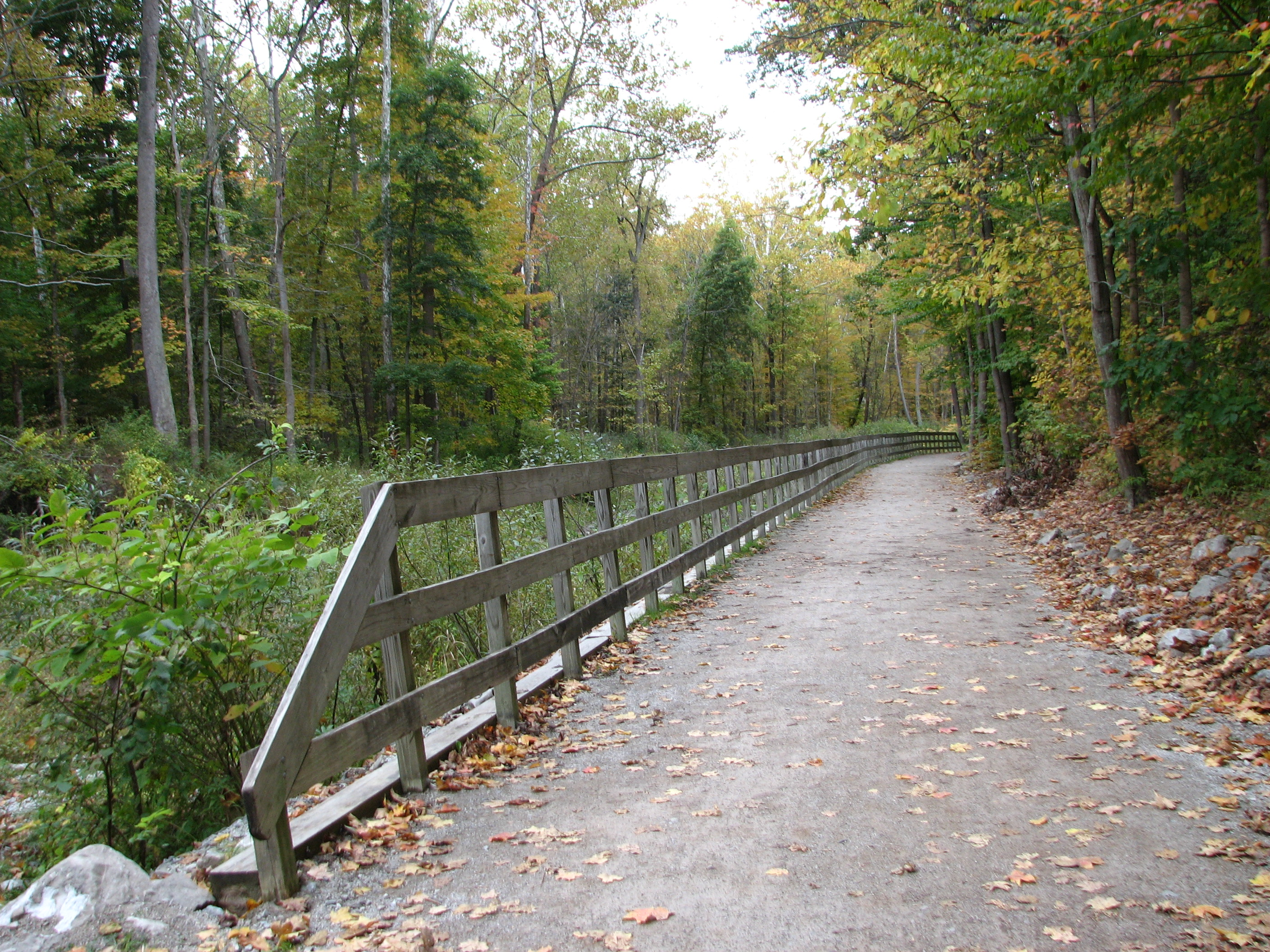
The Towpath Trail is a popular attraction of the Cuyahoga Valley National Park

=== National Park Service, Department of the Interior ===
- Cuyahoga Valley National Park
- Hopewell Culture National Historical Park
- Dayton Aviation Heritage National Historical Park

=== U.S. Forest Service, Department of Agriculture ===
- Wayne National Forest

=== U.S. Fish and Wildlife Service, Department of the Interior ===
- Ottawa National Wildlife Refuge Complex
  - Cedar Point National Wildlife Refuge
  - Ottawa National Wildlife Refuge
  - West Sister Island National Wildlife Refuge

=== Army Corps of Engineers, Department of Defense ===
- Belleville Locks and Dam
- Caesar Creek Dam (at Caesar Creek State Park)
- Tom Jenkins Dam (at Burr Oak State Park)

== State lands ==
=== State parks ===
Ohio State Parks (Hover mouse over pog to popup clickable link)

Name	County	Size		Image	Year established
Name	County	acres	km^{2}	Image	Year established
A. W. Marion State Park	Pickaway	454	1.84		1950
Adams Lake State Park	Adams	96	0.39		1950
Alum Creek State Park	Delaware	8,017	32.44		1974
Barkcamp State Park	Belmont	1,122	4.54		1955
Beaver Creek State Park	Columbiana	2,726	11.06		1949
Blue Rock State Park	Muskingum	337	1.36		1949
Buck Creek State Park	Clark	4,016	16.25		1975
Buckeye Lake State Park	Fairfield, Perry	3,349	13.55		1949
Burr Oak State Park	Athens, Morgan	2,593	10.49		1952
Caesar Creek State Park	Warren, Clinton, Greene	7,941	32.13		1978
Catawba Island State Park	Ottawa	677	2.73		Early 1950s
Cowan Lake State Park	Clinton	1,775	7.18		1968
Deer Creek State Park	Fayette, Pickaway	3,564	14.35		
Delaware State Park	Delaware	3,016	12.20		1952
Dillon State Park	Muskingum	3,845	15.56		1961
East Fork State Park	Clermont	7,030	28.45		1978
East Harbor State Park	Ottawa	1,831	7.41		1947
Findley State Park	Lorain	931	3.77		
Forked Run State Park	Meigs	893	3.61		1951
Geneva State Park	Ashtabula	698	2.82		1964
Grand Lake St. Marys State Park	Auglaize	14,091	57.02		1949
Great Council State Park	Greene	0.7	0.0028		2023
Great Seal State Park	Ross	1,864	7.54		1979
Guilford Lake State Park	Columbiana	489	1.98		
Harrison Lake State Park	Fulton	247	1.00		1950
Headlands Beach State Park	Lake	120	0.48		1953
Hocking Hills State Park	Hocking	2,373	9.60		1924
Hueston Woods State Park	Butler, Preble	3,596	14.55		1957
Independence Dam State Park	Defiance	591	2.39		1949
Indian Lake State Park	Logan	6,600	26.71		
Jackson Lake State Park	Jackson	349	1.41		1979
Jefferson Lake State Park	Jefferson	962	3.89		
Jesse Owens State Park	Morgan	5,735	23.21		2020
John Bryan State Park	Greene	752	3.04		1951
Kelleys Island State Park	Erie	677	2.73		1956
Kiser Lake State Park	Champaign	927	3.75		1940
Lake Alma State Park	Vinton	352	1.42		
Lake Hope State Park	Vinton	3,103	12.56		1937 (renamed in 1949)
Lake Logan State Park	Hocking	718	2.91		1964
Lake Loramie State Park	Auglaize	2,062	8.34		1949
Lake Milton State Park	Mahoning	1,700	6.88		
Lake White State Park	Pike	429	1.74		
Little Miami State Park	Hamilton, Clermont, Warren, Greene	707	2.86		
Madison Lake State Park	Madison	182	0.74		
Malabar Farm State Park	Richland	878	3.55		
Mary Jane Thurston State Park	Henry	591	2.39		
Maumee Bay State Park	Lucas	1,436	5.81		Acquisition:1973, Established: 1975
Middle Bass Island State Park	Ottawa				
Mohican State Park	Ashland, Holmes	1,115	4.51		
Mosquito Lake State Park	Trumbull	6,483	26.24		
Mount Gilead State Park	Morrow	181	0.73		
Muskingum River State Park	Coshocton, Morgan, Muskingum, Washington				1958
Nelson Kennedy Ledges State Park	Portage	167	0.67		
Oak Point State Park	Ottawa	677	2.73		
Paint Creek State Park	Ross	6,842	27.67		
Pike Lake State Park	Ross	600	2.43		
Portage Lakes State Park	Summit	2,475	10.02		
Punderson State Park	Geauga	891	3.61		
Pymatuning State Park	Ashtabula	3,512	14.21		
Quail Hollow State Park	Stark	703	2.84		
Rocky Fork State Park	Highland	3,464	14.02		
Salt Fork State Park	Guernsey	20,181	81.67		1960
Scioto Trail State Park	Ross	248	1.00		1922
Shawnee State Park	Scioto	1,163	4.71		
South Bass Island State Park	Ottawa	677	2.73		
Spiegel Grove State Park	Sandusky	25	0.10		1873
Stonelick State Park	Clermont	1,258	5.09		1948
Strouds Run State Park	Athens	2,606	10.54		1953
Sycamore State Park	Montgomery	2,389	9.67		
Tar Hollow State Park	Hocking	619	2.51		1949
Tinker's Creek State Park	Geauga	370	1.50		1973
Van Buren State Park	Hancock	296	1.20		1950
West Branch State Park	Portage	8,002	32.38		1966
Wingfoot Lake State Park	Portage	614	2.48		
Wolf Run State Park	Noble	1,266	5.12		Acquisition: 1963, Dedication: 1968

=== State memorials ===
- Adena State Memorial
- Buckeye Furnace State Memorial
- Campbell Mound State Memorial
- Flint Ridge State Memorial
- Friends Meeting House State Memorial
- Fort Ancient State Memorial, Warren County
- Fort Hill State Memorial
- Glendower State Memorial, Warren County
- Leo Petroglyph State Memorial
- Miamisburg Mound State Memorial, Montgomery County
- Serpent Mound State Memorial
- Story Mound State Memorial
- Tarlton Cross Mound State Memorial

=== State forests ===
- Blue Rock State Forest – 4,572 acres (19 km^{2})
- Brush Creek State Forest – ca. 12,000 acres (49 km^{2})
- Dean State Forest – 2,745 acres (10 km^{2})
- Fernwood State Forest – 2,107 acres (9 km^{2})
- Gifford State Forest – 320 acres (1.3 km^{2}); Athens County
- Harrison State Forest – 1,345 acres (5 km^{2})
- Hocking State Forest – 9,374 acres (38 km^{2})
- Maumee State Forest – 3,068 acres (12 km^{2})
- Mohican-Memorial State Forest – 4,192 acres (17 km^{2}); Ashland County
- Perry State Forest – 4,567 acres (18 km^{2}); Perry County
- Pike State Forest – 11,621 acres (47 km^{2})
- Richland Furnace State Forest – 2,343 acres (9 km^{2})
- Scioto Trail State Forest – 9,371 acres (38 km^{2})
- Shade River State Forest – 2,601 acres (11 km^{2}); Meigs County
- Shawnee State Forest – 59,603 acres (241 km^{2}); Scioto and Adams Counties
- Sunfish Creek State Forest – 637 acres (2.6 km^{2})
- Tar Hollow State Forest – 16,126 acres (65 km^{2})
- Vinton Furnace State Experimental Forest - 15,849 acres (64.14 km^{2})
- Waterloo State Forest (administered by Zaleski State Forest); Athens County
- Yellow Creek State Forest – 756 acres (3.1 km^{2})
- Zaleski State Forest – 26,313 acres (107 km^{2}); Athens and Vinton Counties

=== State wildlife management areas ===
- Cooper Hollow Wildlife Area (Jackson County)
- Fox Lake Wildlife Management Area (Athens County)
- Highlandtown Wildlife Area (Columbiana County, Washington Township)
- Milan State Wildlife Area
- Sunday Creek Wildlife Management Area (Athens County)
- Tiffin River Wildlife Area (Fulton County)
- Trimble Wildlife Management Area (Athens County)
- Turkey Ridge Wildlife Area (Vinton County)
- Waterloo Wildlife Research Station (Athens County)
- Wolf Creek Wildlife Management Area (Morgan County)

=== State nature preserves ===
- Acadia Cliffs State Nature Preserve
- Adams Lake Prairie State Nature Preserve
- Audubon Islands State Nature Preserve
- Aurora Sanctuary State Nature Preserve
- Baker Woods State Nature Preserve
- Bigelow Cemetery Prairie State Nature Preserve
- Blackhand Gorge State Nature Preserve
- Boord State Nature Preserve
- Brown's Lake Bog State Nature Preserve
- Burton Wetlands State Nature Preserve
- Caesar Creek Gorge State Nature Preserve
- Carmean Woods State Nature Preserve
- Cedar Bog State Nature Preserve
- Chaparral Prairie State Nature Preserve
- Clear Creek State Nature Preserve
- Clear Fork Gorge State Nature Preserve
- Clifton Gorge State Nature Preserve
- Collier State Nature Preserve
- Compass Plant Prairie State Nature Preserve
- Conkle's Hollow State Nature Preserve
- Conneaut Swamp State Nature Preserve
- Cranberry Bog State Nature Preserve
- Crooked Run State Nature Preserve
- Culberson Woods State Nature Preserve
- Davey Woods State Nature Preserve
- Davis Memorial State Nature Preserve
- Drew Woods State Nature Preserve
- Dupont Marsh State Nature Preserve
- Eagle Creek State Nature Preserve
- Erie Sand Barrens State Nature Preserve
- Fowler Woods State Nature Preserve
- Gahanna Woods State Nature Preserve
- Goll Woods State Nature Preserve
- Goode Prairie State Nature Preserve
- Greenville Falls State Nature Preserve
- Gross Woods State Nature Preserve
- Hach-Otis State Nature Preserve
- Halls Creek Woods State Nature Preserve
- Headlands Dunes State Nature Preserve
- Herrick Fen State Nature Preserve
- Hueston Woods State Nature Preserve
- Hutchins (Highbanks) State Nature Preserve
- Irwin Prairie State Nature Preserve
- Jackson Bog State Nature Preserve
- Johnson Ridge State Nature Preserve
- Johnson Woods State Nature Preserve
- Kendrick Woods State Nature Preserve
- Kent (Cooperrider) Bog State Nature Preserve
- Kessler Swamp State Nature Preserve
- Kiser Lake Wetlands State Nature Preserve
- Kitty Todd State Nature Preserve
- Knox Woods State Nature Preserve
- Kyle Woods State Nature Preserve
- Lake Katharine State Nature Preserve
- Lakeside Daisy State Nature Preserve
- Lawrence Woods State Nature Preserve
- Lou Campbell State Nature Preserve
- Mantua Bog State Nature Preserve
- Marie J. Desonier State Nature Preserve
- Marsh Wetlands State Nature Preserve
- Mentor Marsh State Nature Preserve
- Milford Center Prairie State Nature Preserve
- Morris Woods State Nature Preserve
- North Pond State Nature Preserve
- North Shore Alvar State Nature Preserve
- Novak State Nature Preserve
- Old Woman Creek State Nature Preserve
- Olsen (Augusta-Anne) State Nature Preserve
- Pickerington Ponds State Nature Preserve
- Portage Lakes Wetland State Nature Preserve
- Riddle State Nature Preserve
- Rockbridge State Nature Preserve
- Sears Woods State Nature Preserve
- Seymour Woods State Nature Preserve
- Shallenberger State Nature Preserve
- Sharon Woods Gorge State Nature Preserve
- Sheepskin Hollow State Nature Preserve
- Sheldon Marsh State Nature Preserve
- Shoemaker State Nature Preserve
- Siegenthaler-Kaestner Esker State Nature Preserve
- Smith Cemetery Prairie State Nature Preserve
- Solon Woods State Nature Preserve
- Springville Marsh State Nature Preserve
- Stage's Pond State Nature Preserve
- Stratford Woods State Nature Preserve
- Swamp Cottonwood State Nature Preserve
- Thomas (Sharon Woods) State Nature Preserve
- Tinker's Creek State Nature Preserve
- Triangle Lake Bog State Nature Preserve
- Tucker (Blacklick) State Nature Preserve
- Tummonds State Nature Preserve
- Wahkeena State Nature Preserve
- Whipple State Nature Preserve
- Zimmerman Prairie State Nature Preserve

== Metroparks ==
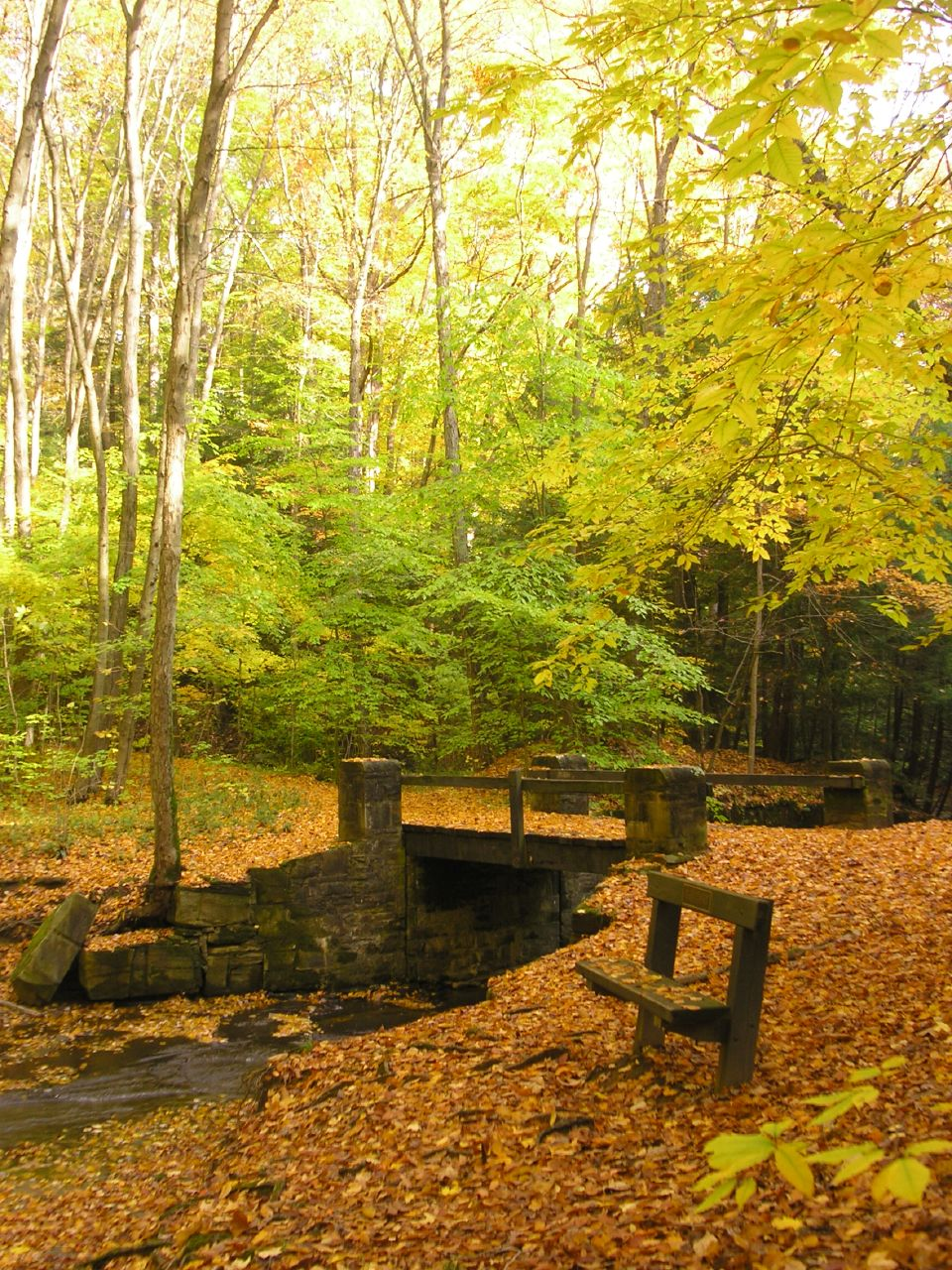
The Cleveland Metroparks' South Chagrin Reservation in autumn

A number of regional park districts have been organized in Ohio:

- Cleveland Metroparks
- Columbus and Franklin County Metropolitan Park District
- Erie MetroParks
- Five Rivers Metroparks (Dayton)
- Geauga County Park District
- Johnny Appleseed Metropolitan Park District
- Lake Metroparks
- Stark County Park District
- Tuscarawas County Park Department
- Lorain County Metro Parks
- Metro Parks, Serving Summit County
- MetroParks of Butler County
- Metroparks of the Toledo Area
- Mill Creek MetroParks
- Great Parks of Hamilton County

== Other significant local areas ==
- Arc of Appalachia
- Athens Conservancy preserves, in Athens County, Ohio
- Crane Hollow Nature Preserve, Hocking County, Ohio
- Edge of Appalachia Preserve, in Adams County, Ohio
- Highlands Sanctuary, centered in Highland County, Ohio
- Moonville Rail-Trail, a rail-trail in Athens and Vinton Counties
- Strouds Ridge Preserve, City of Athens, Ohio
- Trimble Community Forest in Athens County, Ohio
- The Wilds (Muskingum County, Ohio)
