= Damascus Township =

Damascus Township may refer to the following townships in the United States:

- Damascus Township, Ohio
- Damascus Township, Wayne County, Pennsylvania
