= Deer Creek State Park =

Deer Creek State Park may refer to:

- Deer Creek State Park (Ohio), a state park at Deer Creek Lake in Fayette and Pickaway counties in Ohio, United States
- Deer Creek State Park (Utah), a state park at the Deer Creek Reservoir in western Wasatch County, Utah, United States
- Deer Creek State Park, former name for Rocks State Park in northwestern Hartford County, Maryland, United States
