= Sycamore State Park =

State park in Montgomery County, Ohio, U.S.

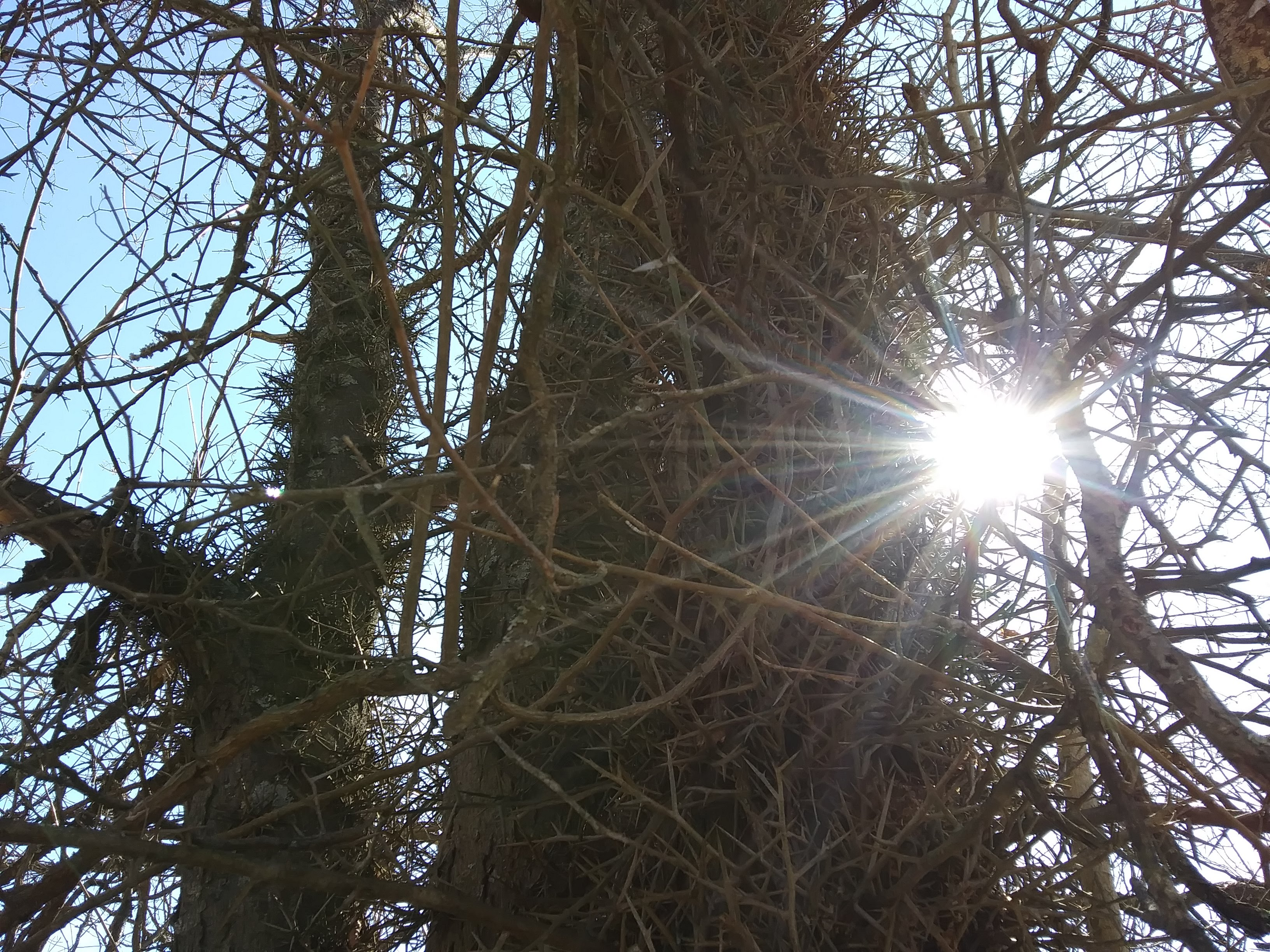
- Honey Locust tree in Sycamore State Park, March 2020

- Location within Ohio
- Location: Montgomery County, Ohio, U.S.
- Nearest city: Trotwood, Ohio
- Coordinates: 39.8139°N 84.3678°WState Parks
- Area: 2,384 acres (965 ha)
- Elevation: 840 ft (260 m)
- Established: 1979
- Administrator: Ohio Department of Natural Resources
- Designation: Ohio state park
- Website: ohiodnr.gov/go-and-do/plan-a-visit/find-a-property/sycamore-state-park

Sycamore State Park is a 2,384-acre (965 ha) protected woodlands and public recreation park at 4675 N. Diamond Mill Road, in Trotwood, Ohio, United States. It is the only state park in Montgomery County, Ohio along Wolf Creek, a tributary of the Miami River, immediately west of Trotwood, east of Brookville, Ohio, and south of Clayton. The nearest city is Dayton, Ohio.

== History ==
The first inhabitants of the area were the Adena Native Americans who resided in Ohio around 800 B.C. to 700 A.D. Evidence of their presence can be seen at the ceremonial mound found in the park. In the mid to late 1700s, the area became a stronghold of the Miami and Shawnee tribes. After General Anthony Wayne’s defeat of the tribes at the Battle of Fallen Timbers, the Greenville Treaty of 1795 stripped the Native Americans of their lands. In less than a year following the signing of the treaty, the first settlers arrived.

Settlers were attracted to this area because of the fertile soil. When the Miami-Erie Canal was completed in 1829, the area became quite prosperous. Underlying the rich fertile soils were vast beds of gravel and sand providing excellent materials for road making. Hundreds of miles of roads were built in the county with these materials making it one of the most accessible during the state's infancy.

At one time, the land comprising Sycamore State Park was purchased by a development corporation to build a housing project. When the corporation was unable to complete the construction, the lands were offered to the state of Ohio. Sycamore was dedicated as a state park in November 1979.

== Activities and amenities ==
The park offers horseback riding, hiking, hunting, and group camping along with picnic shelters. It also states winter activities sledding, cross-country skiing, snowmobiling, ice skating, and ice fishing.
