= Mount Gilead State Park =

State park in Ohio, United States

Mt. Gilead State Park
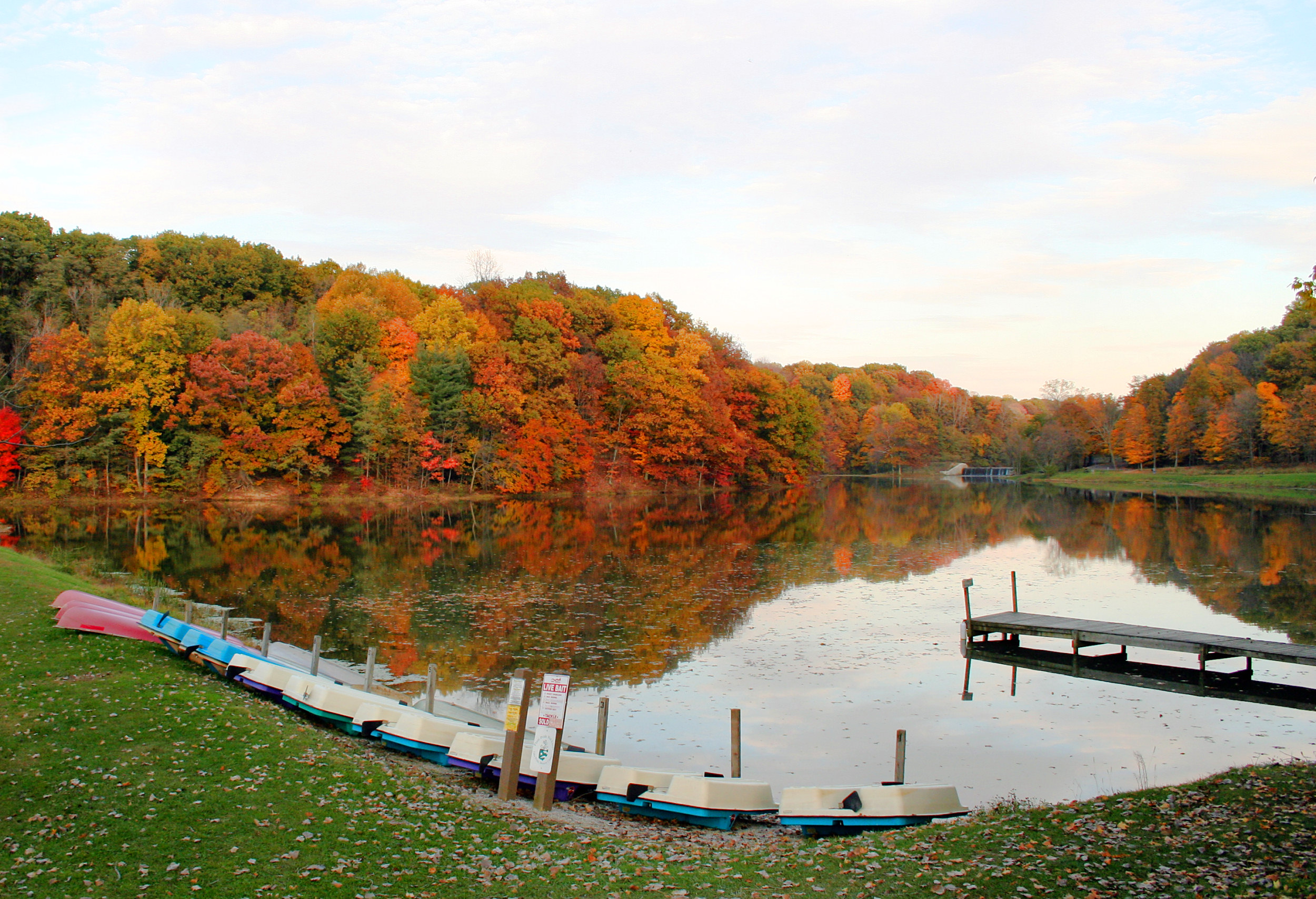

- Location within Ohio Location within the United States
- Location: Morrow County, Ohio, United States
- Coordinates: 40°33′00″N 82°48′42″W
- Area: Land: 181 acres (73 ha); Water: 32 acres (13 ha)
- Elevation: 1,148 ft (350 m)
- Established: 1949
- Administrator: Ohio Department of Natural Resources
- Designation: Ohio state park
- Website: Mt. Gilead State Park

Mt. Gilead State Park is a public recreation area located immediately to the east of the village of Mount Gilead in Morrow County, Ohio, United States. The state park covers 181 acres (73 ha), 32 of which are the upper and lower lakes. It offers hiking, camping, picnicking, fishing and electric-motor boating as well as wintertime ice skating, ice fishing, and cross-country skiing. Access to the park is via State Route 95.

== History ==
Work on the park began in the early 1900s, with the creation of a dam across Sam's Creek. Work continued through the proceeding decades, with a larger lake being completed below the first one on July 10, 1930. In 1949, the park was turned over to the Ohio Department of Natural Resources.
