= Catawba Island State Park =

Park in Ohio, USA

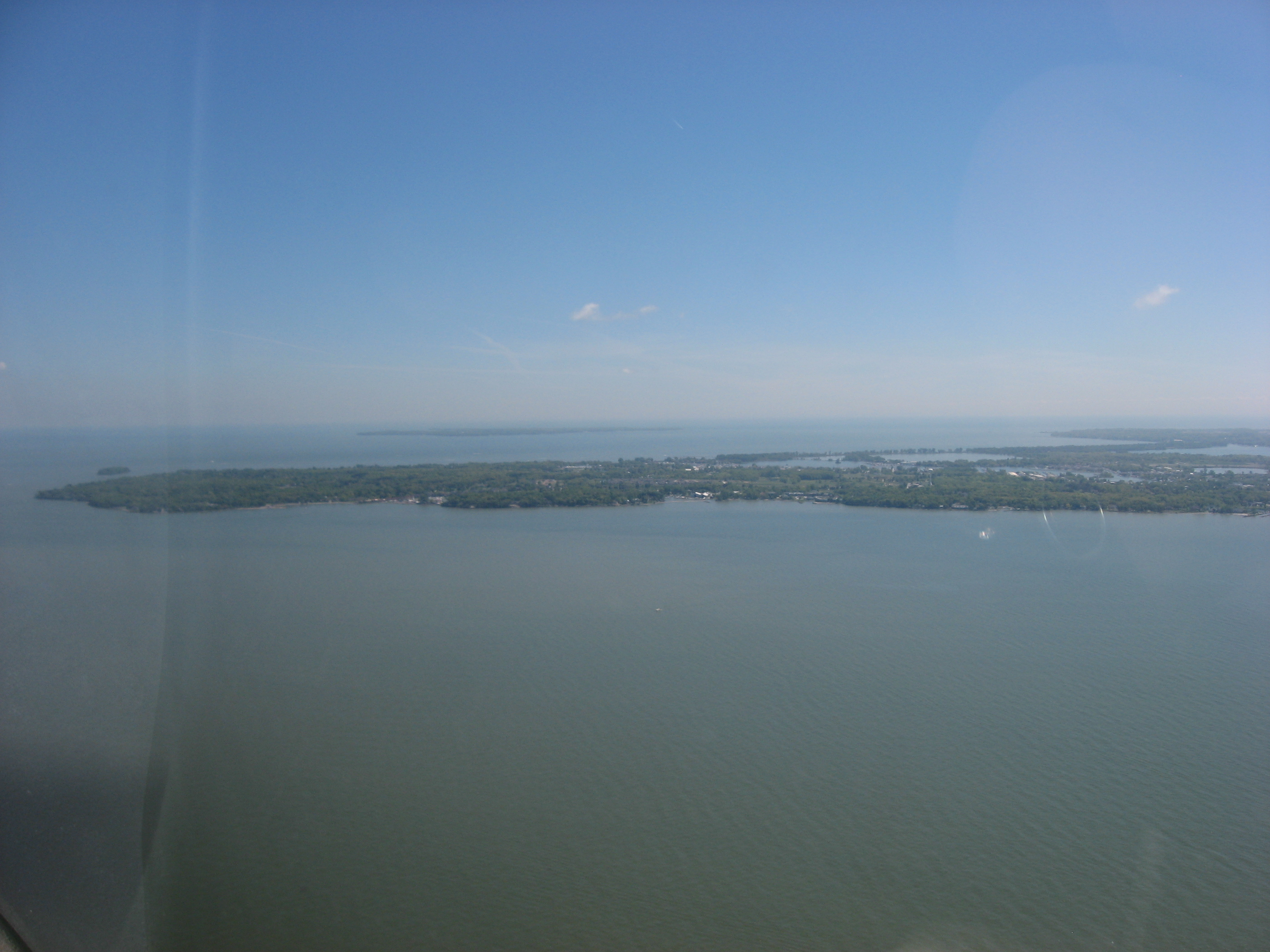
- Catawba Island from the air, looking east

- Location within Ohio Location within the United States
- Location: Ottawa County, Ohio, United States
- Coordinates: 41°34′30″N 82°51′26″W
- Area: 10 acres (4.0 ha)
- Elevation: 587 ft (179 m)
- Established: 1950s
- Administrator: Ohio Department of Natural Resources
- Designation: Ohio state park
- Website: Catawba Island State Park

Catawba Island State Park is a ten-acre (4.0 ha) public recreation area located on Lake Erie, six miles northeast of Port Clinton, Ohio. Boating, fishing and picnicking are the major activities of the park. The state park, along with the other units in Ohio's Lake Erie state parks group, was established in the early 1950s.
