= Findley State Park =

State park in Wellington, Ohio, United States

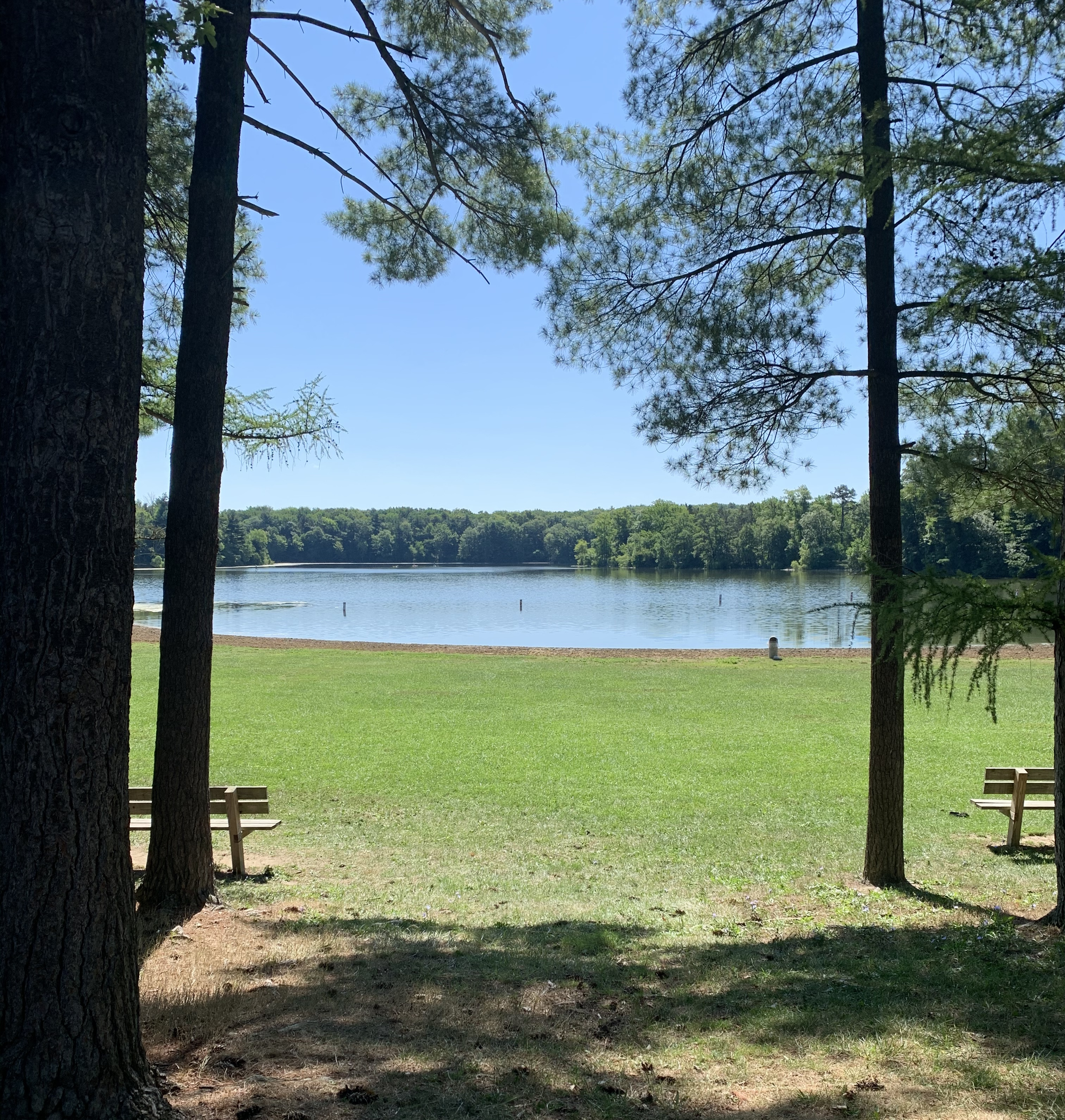
- Lake view at Findley State Park

- Location within Ohio Location within the United States
- Location: Wellington, Ohio, United States
- Coordinates: 41°08′N 82°13′W
- Area: 838 acres (339 ha)
- Created: 1950
- Administrator: Ohio Department of Natural Resources
- Designation: Ohio state park
- Website: Findley State Park

Findley State Park is an Ohio state park located in Wellington, a small village in northern Ohio, United States. It was originally known as the Findley State Forest. A dam forming a lake was completed in 1956. The forest area became a state park in 1950, with a size of 838 acres (339 ha), after it was donated to Lorain County by Judge Guy B. Findley c. 1936. Findley later served as the president of the Ohio Forestry Association and vice president of the American Forestry Association.

== History ==
Findley donated the lands to the state, with the condition that they would "forever be used exclusively as a state forest for the production of timber and for experiment with forestry projects." The Cleveland Press later described it as "the judge's personal weapon in a long fight against juvenile delinquency".

Between 1937 and 1939, the Civilian Conservation Corps planted approximately 200,000 trees inside the park. Findley himself helped to plant trees, on his days off or after court sessions. Later expansions to the park included an allocation of $150,000 from the state in 1963 for construction of campground amenities, and funding for 150 new camp sites in 1968.

State parks in Ohio, including Findley State Park, were shut down on September 7, 1971, due to a failure to pass a new budget. The closings were planned to be indefinite, until a budget had been reached. This was unpopular, and a petition with over 19,000 signatures protesting the park closings was turned in a month later. The governor rejected the petition, and his response was criticized for saying that Ohio was both a wealthy state but in need of a new tax. The parks eventually reopened on November 5.

== Activities ==
The property offers hiking and mountain biking trails. It connects to the Buckeye Trail. There is also a 93 acres (38 ha) lake open to paddlecraft. It also has camping and an 18 hole disc golf course. Fishing, trapping, and waterfowl hinting are also offered. A visitor center and nature center offers seasonal programming. There are picnic tables, grills, shelter areas, and a 435 foot (133 m) swimming beach. A map of the park is online.

The park was formerly a hunting area, before protests by campers of squirrel hunting during the fall of 1966 leading to it being disallowed the next year. As of 2026, hunting migratory waterfowl is permitted in some parts of the park, while deer, beaver, and otter hunting and trapping permission can be received via lottery.

The Friends of Findley State Park, Inc. is a 501(c)(3) organization established in 2004 to help preserve and maintain the park.

The park includes pine forest, hardwoods, and meadows. An archery range was planned for the park in 2022.

== See also ==
- Ohio Department of Natural Resources
- List of protected areas of Ohio
