= Geneva State Park =

Park in Ohio, USA

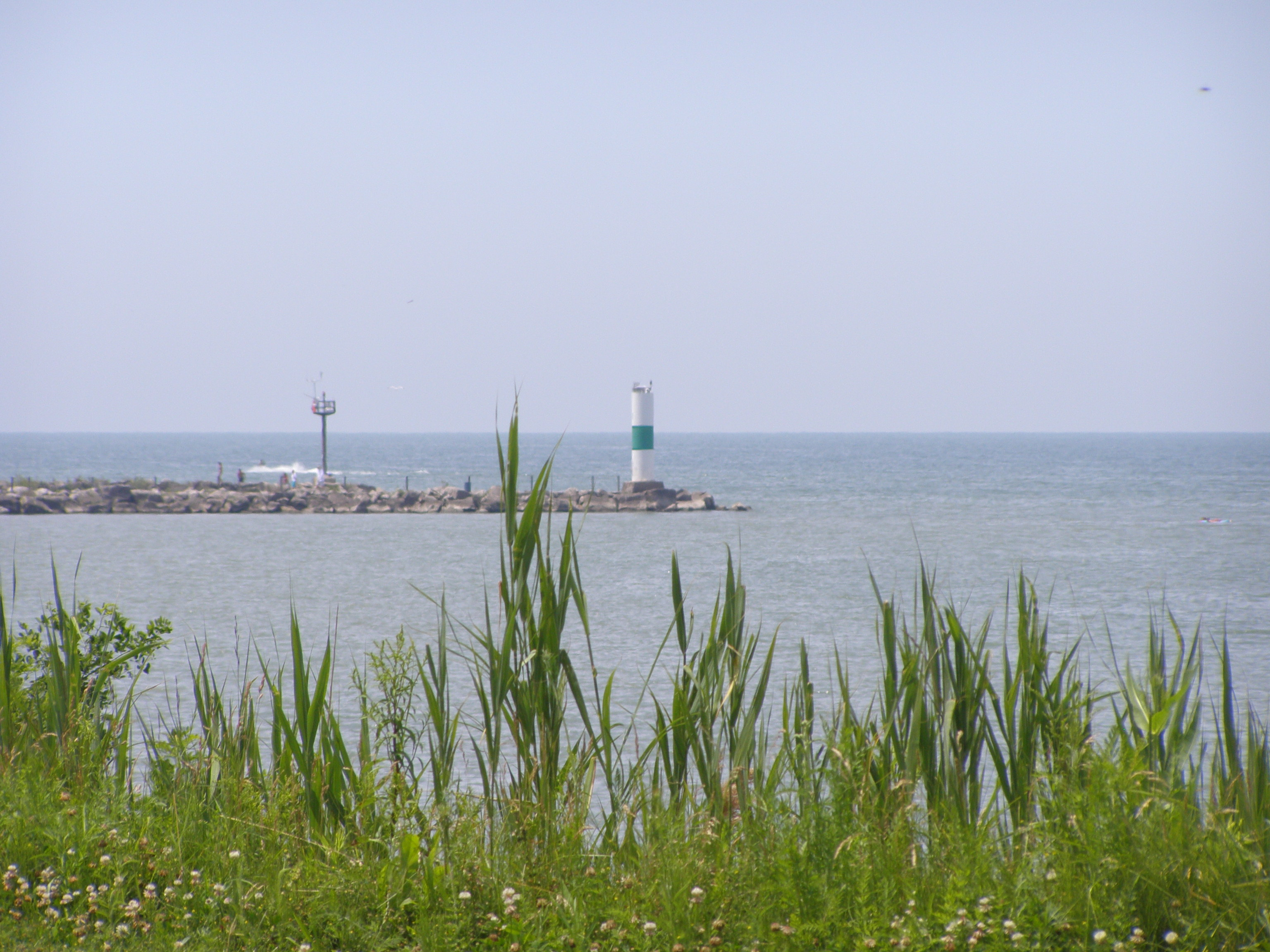
- Lighthouse and marina entrance at Geneva State Park.

- Location within Ohio Location within the United States
- Location: Ashtabula County, Ohio, United States
- Coordinates: 41°51′15″N 80°58′19″W
- Area: 698 acres (282 ha)
- Elevation: 587 ft (179 m)
- Established: 1964
- Administrator: Ohio Department of Natural Resources
- Designation: Ohio state park
- Website: Geneva State Park

Geneva State Park is a 698-acre (282 ha) public recreation area located on the shore of Lake Erie in Geneva, Ashtabula County, Ohio, United States. Park activities include hiking, camping, fishing, boating, canoeing and swimming, snowmobiling, cross-country skiing, and ice fishing. The state park offers access to Lake Erie's central basin through a six-lane boat ramp and marina. Overnight accommodations include a concessionaire-operated lodge with lakeside cottages.
