= Kon-Tiki Theatre =

- Interactive map of the Kon-Tiki Theatre area
- Alternative names: Salem Avenue Cinemas, Loews Salem Avenue

General information
- Type: Cinema
- Architectural style: Polynesian
- Location: 4140 Salem Avenue, Trotwood, Ohio 45416
- Coordinates: 39.805466°N 84.257002°W
- Completed: 1968
- Demolished: January 4, 2005

Dimensions
- Other dimensions: originally 1 auditorium, later 3

The Kon-Tiki Theatre was a Polynesian-themed cinema operating in Trotwood, Ohio, United States, a suburb of Dayton, Ohio, between 1968 and 1999. The unique building was a landmark along Salem Avenue for decades before being demolished in 2005 to make room for a medical facility.

The Kon Tiki was originally owned and operated by the Levin family. On May 13, 1987, the owners leased it to USA Cinemas who renamed it Salem Avenue Cinemas. USA Cinemas was later acquired by the Loews chain, which changed the name to Loews Salem Ave. It was built as a single auditorium. A second auditorium was added later, and the original one divided, so that it was a triplex at the time it closed. After the cinema closed, the owners donated the building and land to the city of Trotwood.
