= Quail Hollow State Park =

Park in Ohio, USA

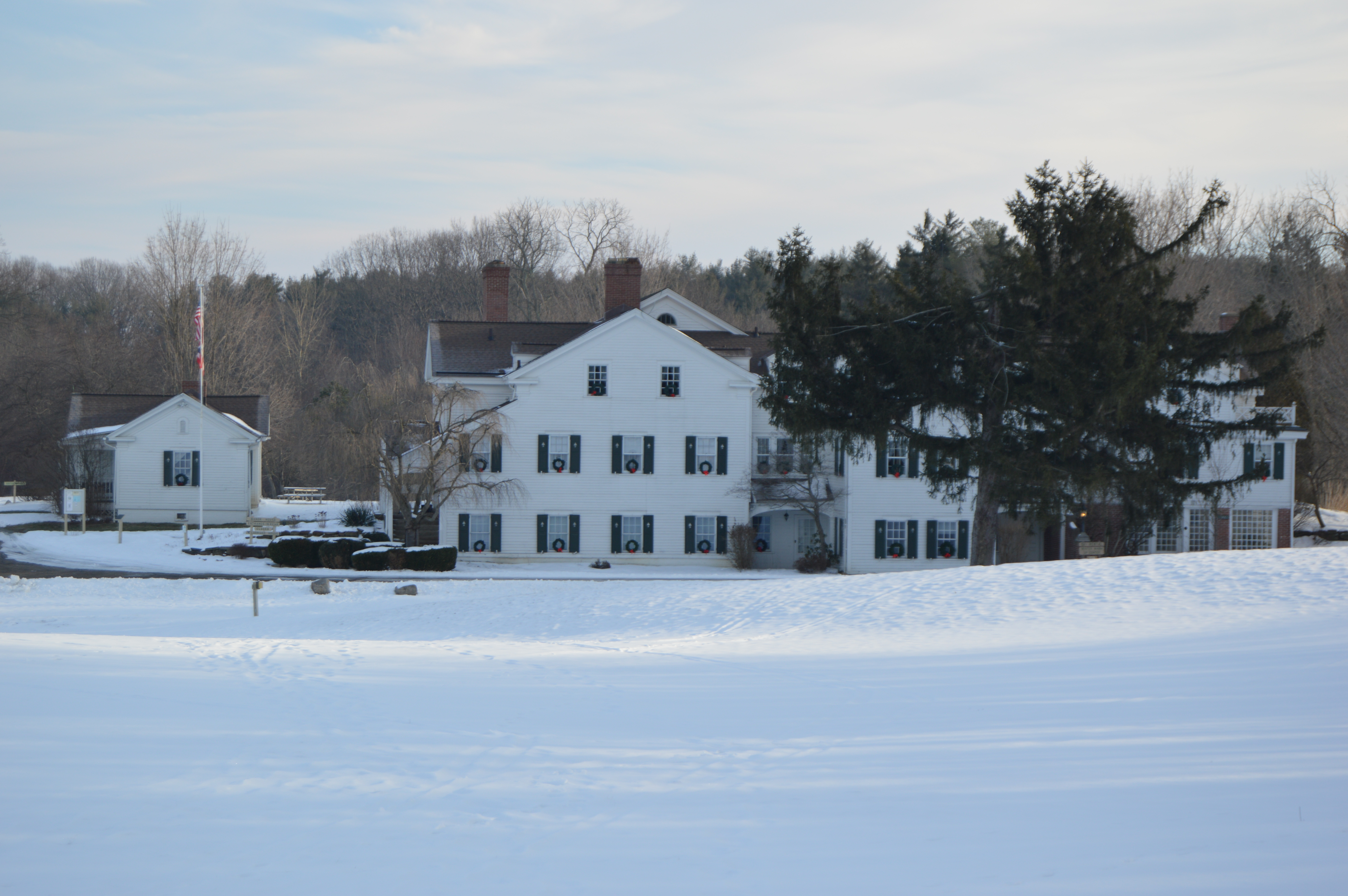
- The Stewart house and associated buildings

- Location within Ohio Location within the United States
- Location: Stark County, Ohio, United States
- Coordinates: 40°58′43″N 81°18′44″W
- Area: 703 acres (284 ha)
- Elevation: 1,158 ft (353 m)
- Established: 1975
- Administrator: Stark Parks
- Designation: Ohio state park
- Website: Quail Hollow State Park

Quail Hollow Park is a 703-acre (284 ha) county park in Stark County, Ohio, in the United States. The park was opened to the public in 1975. It was previously a privately owned family farm and later a hunting camp. Quail Hollow Park is open for year-round recreation and features trail that are open to hiking, mountain biking and cross-country skiing, a small pond for fishing and ice skating as well as group camping (advance reservation only) and picnic facilities.

== History ==
The land in and around Quail Hollow Park was inhabited by various Native American tribes. The last tribe to call the area home before being forced out by the encroachment of Anglo-American settlers in the Ohio Country were the Lenape, also known as the Delaware.

The first permanent settler in the area was Conrad Brumbaugh. He cleared some land and began farming in the area in 1820. The homestead remained in the Brumbaugh family until 1914, when it was purchased by Harry Bartlett Stewart. Stewart was the chairman of the board of the Akron, Canton and Youngstown Railroad. Initially the Stewarts used homestead for a hunting camp before eventually expanding the home and making their permanent residence on what they called the Minnie Taylor Farm, named for Mr. Stewart's wife, Minnie.

Harry Stewart passed the land onto his son, Harry Bartlett Stewart, Jr. The Stewarts continued to improve the buildings on the Minnie Taylor farm. The original house was expanded into what they called a manor with Greek Revival and Federal architecture influences.

The Stewarts remained at Minnie Taylor farm until 1975 when the sold it to the state of Ohio for half the appraised value. The land was purchased from the Stewarts with financial help from the United States Department of the Interior. Quail Hollow State Park was established on May 15, 1975. It became Quail Hollow Park in 2016, when the State of Ohio and the Stark County Park District made an agreement for Stark Parks to manage the park as part of the county park district.

== Ecology ==
Quail Hollow Park is in a rich agricultural area. Northeast Ohio is part of the Interior Plains region of North America. The land is largely flat with a few hills that are a remnant of the last ice age. Small glacial lakes, known as kettle lakes are spread throughout the region. These lakes formed when the glaciers gouged out a depression in the land and large clumps of ice broke off the receding glaciers filling the holes and creating lakes.

One of these kettle lakes has shrunk into what is best classified as a bog at Quail Hollow Park. This bog provides a habitat for and abundance of plants and wildlife. Poison sumac grows in the sphagnum bog. There is a remnant tall grass prairie in the park that supports sneezeweed, blazing star and various other prairie plants. The mixed tree forests of the park provide habitat for white-tailed deer, spring peepers, wild turkey, chorus and green frogs, raccoons, garter snakes, blue gill and red foxes.

== Recreation ==
Quail Hollow Park is open for year-round recreation. There is a primitive campground that is open to large groups such as the Scouts and church youth groups. The campground is remote and is without running water or trash facilities. All water and trash must be carried in and out. The park has 19 miles of trails open to hiking, mountain biking and cross-country skiing. Careful observers will see some wildlife along the trail along with a variety of plant species. There are eight nature trails in the park. Quail Hollow Park has a five mile horse trail. Shady Lane Pond is open to fishing with a valid Ohio fishing license. The picnic area and playground are near Shady Lane Pond.
