= Blue Rock State Park =

Park in Ohio, United States

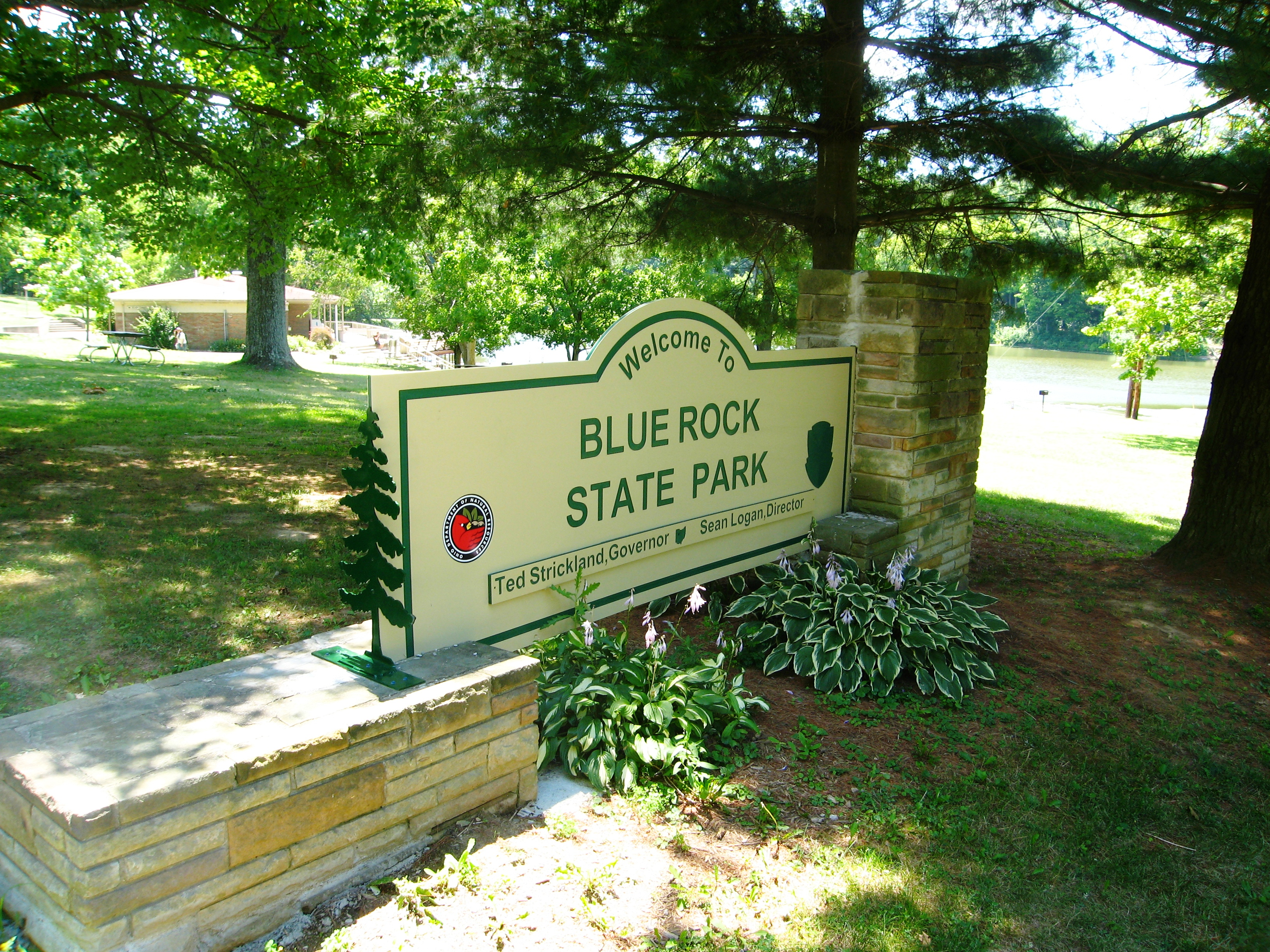
- Entrance sign

- Location within Ohio Location within the United States
- Location: Muskingum County, Ohio, United States
- Coordinates: 39°48′59″N 81°50′50″W
- Area: 322 acres (130 ha)
- Elevation: 840 ft (260 m)
- Established: 1949
- Administrator: Ohio Department of Natural Resources
- Designation: Ohio state park
- Website: Blue Rock State Park

Blue Rock State Park is a public recreation area located 11 miles (18 km) southeast of Zanesville in Muskingum County, Ohio. The state park encompasses 322 acres (130 ha) that are surrounded by the 4,573 acres (1,851 ha) of Blue Rock State Forest.

== History ==
The state's purchase of the state forest began in 1936; the dam creating Cutler Lake was finished in 1938; the state park was officially created with the advent of the Division of Parks and Recreation in 1949.

== Facilities and activities ==
The park offers swimming, boating and fishing on Cutler Lake, camping, nature trails, picnicking facilities, and hunting in the surrounding state forest.

== Gallery ==
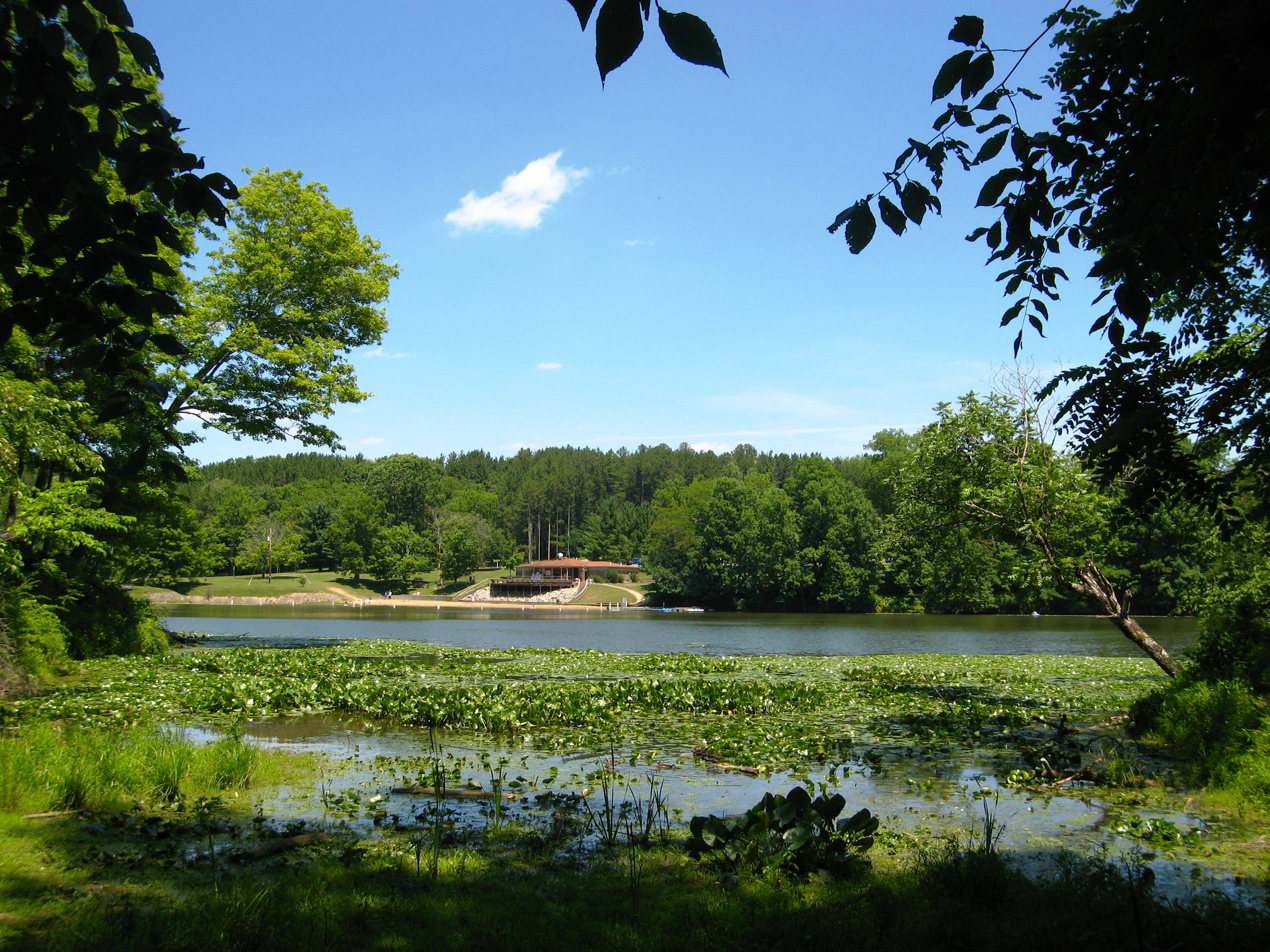
Public beach area viewed from across Cutler Lake

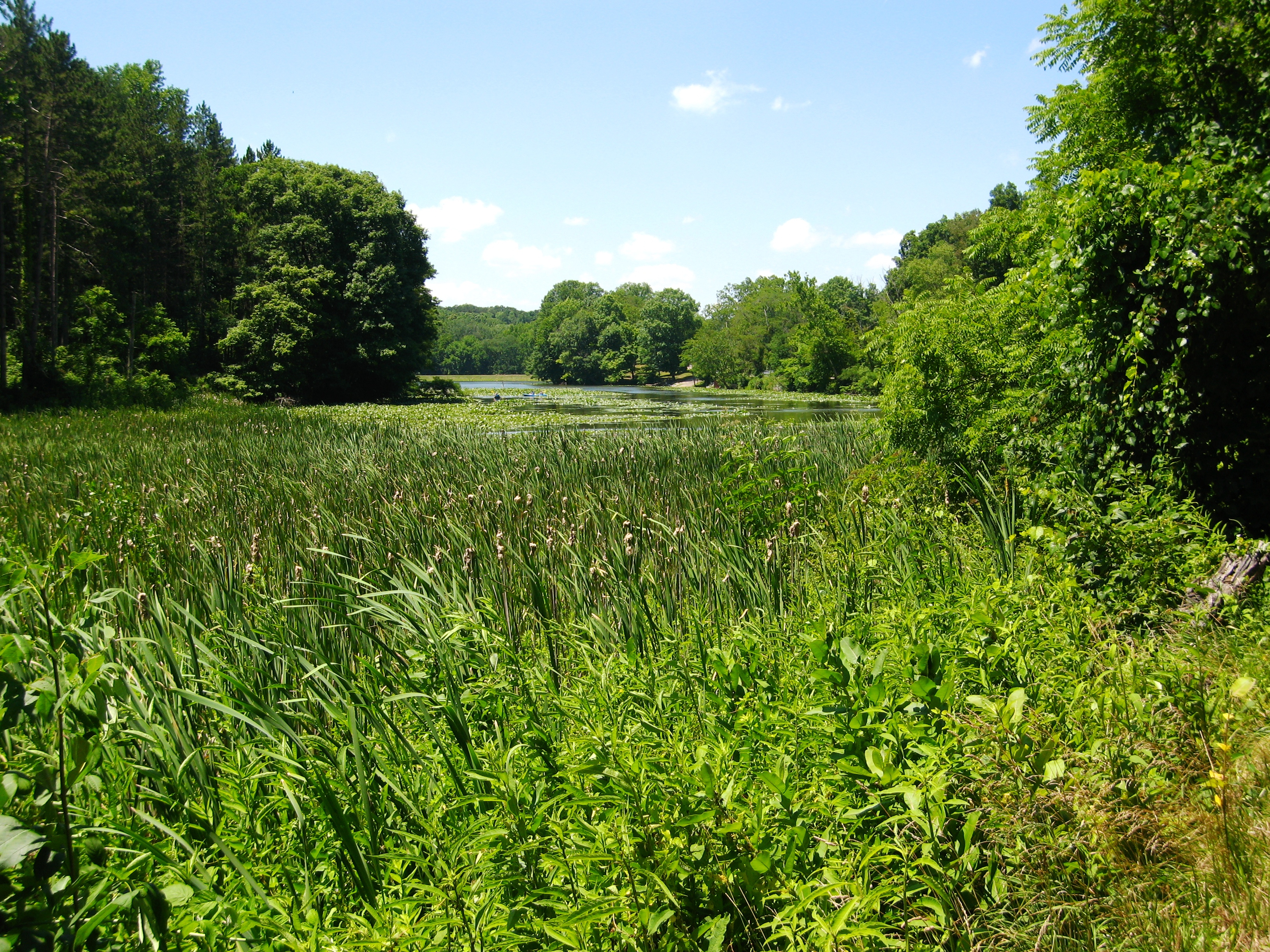
Marsh area at the east end of Cutler Lake
