= Wingfoot Lake State Park =

Coordinates: 41.017°N 81.360°W

Wingfoot Lake State Park is in Mogadore, Ohio. Formerly owned by Goodyear Tire and Rubber Company, it became a state park in 2009. The state park is near Akron, Ohio.

Amenities include an archery range, dog park, paved walking trails, 44 acres (18 ha) lake for boating, kayak rentals, disc golf, fishing, hunting, nature center, picnic and shelter sites, storybook trail, Horseshoe pits, bocce ball courts, ballfields, basketball court, volleyball courts, badminton courts, and 18-hole mini-golf course. Winter sports include ice fishing, sledding, and ice skating. Blimp flights can be viewed from the park.

A map of the park is online. The Wingfoot Lake Wildlife Area is adjacent to the park.

== History ==
The area was affected by glaciation. Goodyear's navigable balloons were manufactured nearby. During World War I crews trained on blimp operation and deployed in the war.

The lake is named for the Goodyear logo. The state park is part of Ohio's Ohio Air & Space Trail.

== See also ==
- Ohio Department of Natural Resources
- List of protected areas of Ohio
