= Muskingum River State Park =

State park in Ohio, United States

- Location within Ohio
- Coordinates: 39.75705°N 81.73427°W
- Length: 112 mi (180 km)
- Created: 1958
- Operator: Ohio Department of Natural Resources
- Website: ohiodnr.gov/go-and-do/plan-a-visit/find-a-property/muskingum-river-state-park

The Muskingum River State Park or the Muskingum River Parkway is a 112-mile-long (180 km) state park in Ohio's Coshocton, Morgan, Muskingum, and Washington counties.

== See also ==
- Muskingum River Navigation Historic District
