= A. W. Marion State Park =

Park in Ohio, United States

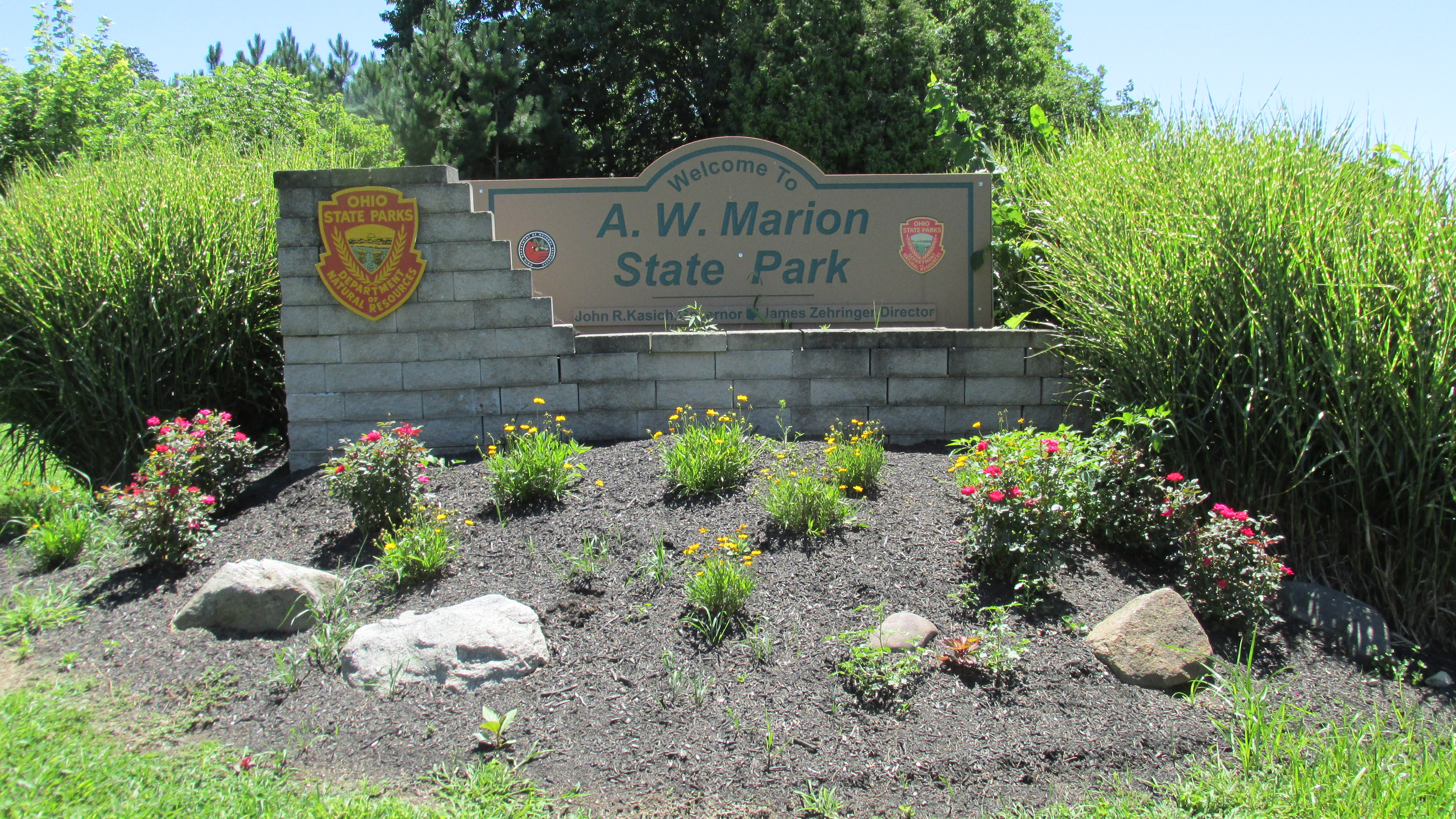
- Entrance sign

- Location within Ohio Location within the United States
- Location: Pickaway County, Ohio, United States
- Coordinates: 39°37′50″N 82°52′47″W
- Area: 310 acres (130 ha)
- Elevation: 869 ft (265 m)
- Established: 1950
- Administrator: Ohio Department of Natural Resources
- Designation: Ohio state park
- Website: A. W. Marion State Park

A. W. Marion State Park is a 310-acre (130 ha) public recreation area located four miles (6.4 km) northeast of Circleville, Ohio. The state park encircles 145-acre (59 ha) Hargus Lake and offers hiking, fishing, and boating.

== Geography ==
A. W. Marion State Park is in the till plain of eastern Ohio. The till plain is flat or rolling hills that has very fertile soil. It comes from the glaciers that covered America over 10,000 years ago. The Adena settled here 2,000 years ago because of the fertile soil.

== History ==
The Division of Parks and Recreation dammed Hargus Creek with an earthen dam in 1948. The property became a state park under the administration of the Ohio Department of Natural Resources in 1950. It was renamed A. W. Marion State Park in honor of the first director of the Department of Natural Resources, who was a Pickaway County native, in 1962.

== Trails ==
The 5-mile-long (8.0 km) Hargus Lake Trail encircles the lake. Mountain biking is allowed on a 7.3-mile-long (11.7 km) multi-use trail.

== Wildlife ==
Wildlife indigenous to the area includes fox squirrel, ring-neck pheasant, a variety of songbird, a variety of waterfowl including mallard and the occasional loon, great blue heron, black racer snake, red fox, and white-tailed deer.

== Boating and fishing ==
Boats with electric motors and rowing boats are allowed on the 145-acre (59 ha) lake. The lake is stocked with largemouth bass, muskellunge, bluegill and channel catfish.

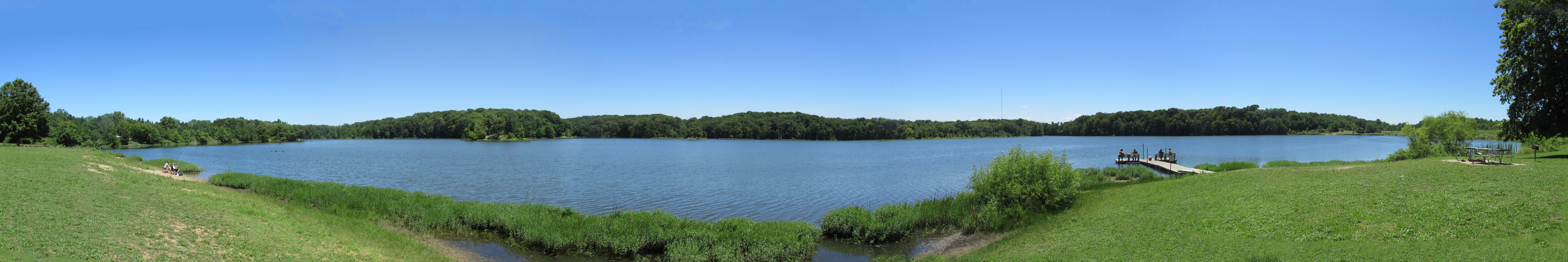
Panorama Hargus Lake
