= Trotwood, Ohio =

City in Ohio, United States

- City
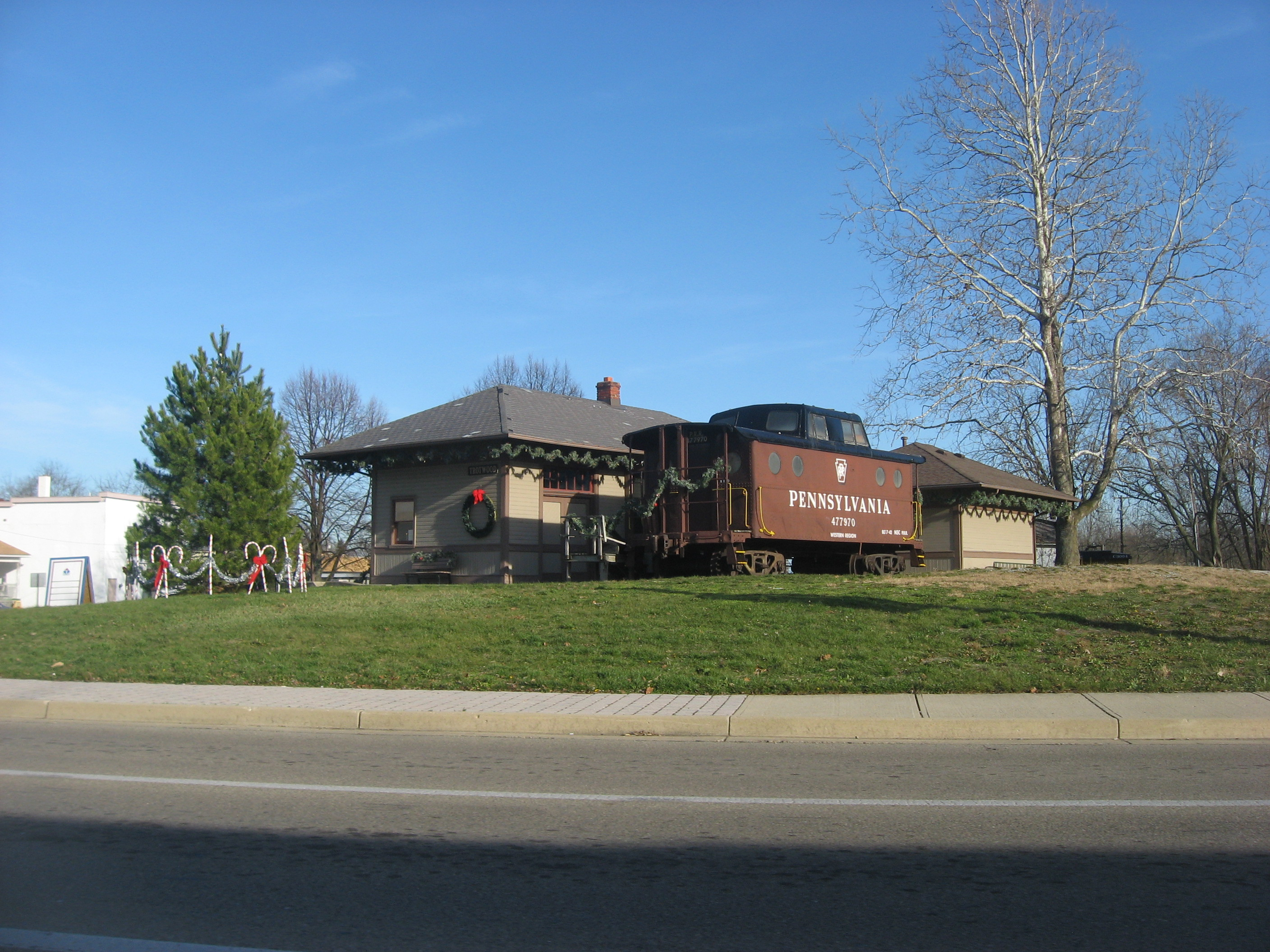
- Trotwood Railroad Station
- Interactive map of Trotwood, Ohio
- Location within Ohio Location within the United States
- Coordinates: 39°46′30″N 84°19′08″W
- Country: United States
- State: Ohio
- County: Montgomery

Government
  - City manager: Quincy Pope

Area
  - Total: 30.51 sq mi (79.02 km^{2})
  - Land: 30.49 sq mi (78.96 km^{2})
  - Water: 0.023 sq mi (0.06 km^{2})
- Elevation: 853 ft (260 m)

Population (2020)
  - Total: 23,070
  - Density: 756.7/sq mi (292.17/km^{2})
- Time zone: UTC-5 (Eastern (EST))
  - Summer (DST): UTC-4 (EDT)
- Area codes: 937, 326
- FIPS code: 39-77504
- GNIS feature ID: 2397059
- Website: trotwood.org

Trotwood is a city in Montgomery County, Ohio, United States. The population was 23,070 at the 2020 census. A suburb of Dayton, it is part of the Dayton metropolitan area. The city is served by the Trotwood-Madison City School District.

== History ==
Trotwood was originally called Higgins Station, and under the latter name was platted in 1854.

The Village of Trotwood was incorporated in 1901 from portions of Madison Township (the township itself was established in 1809); in 1996 the village and township merged into a single political entity. This merger resulted in the creation of a Trotwood neighborhood (Townview) that is completely surrounded by the City of Dayton. Several smaller sections are attached to Trotwood by only a roadway or a small strip of land. The merger also added a large rural area to this suburban community consisting of farms, golf courses, and large rural estates.

On May 27, 2019, Trotwood sustained significant damage from an EF4 tornado that swept through Dayton area. The city suffered damage to 500 homes and 59 homes were destroyed. The Memorial Day tornado struck at 11:00 p.m. after the National Weather Service issued a tornado warning at 10:30 p.m.

== Geography ==
According to the United States Census Bureau, the city has a total area of 30.50 square miles (78.99 km^{2}), of which 30.49 square miles (78.97 km^{2}) is land and 0.01 square miles (0.03 km^{2}) is water.

Wolf Creek, a tributary of the Miami River, runs through Trotwood providing fishing and many scenic areas. Along Wolf Creek is the only state park in Montgomery County. The 3,000-acre (12 km^{2}) Sycamore Woods State Park at 4675 N. Diamond Mill Road, Trotwood, Ohio offers horseback riding, hiking, hunting, and group camping.

The city is adjacent to the cities of Dayton, Clayton (since Clayton merged with its surrounding Randolph Township in 1998) and Englewood.

== Demographics ==
Historical population
Census	Pop.	Note	%±
1870	42		—
1910	348		—
1920	422		21.3%
1930	660		56.4%
1940	770		16.7%
1950	1,066		38.4%
1960	4,992		368.3%
1970	6,997		40.2%
1980	7,809		11.6%
1990	8,816		12.9%
2000	27,420		211.0%
2010	24,431		−10.9%
2020	23,070		−5.6%
2025 (est.)	23,190		0.5%

=== Racial and ethnic composition ===
Trotwood city, Ohio – Racial and ethnic composition Note: the US Census treats Hispanic/Latino as an ethnic category. This table excludes Latinos from the racial categories and assigns them to a separate category. Hispanics/Latinos may be of any race.
Race / Ethnicity (NH = Non-Hispanic)	Pop 2000	Pop 2010	Pop 2020	% 2000	% 2010	2020
White alone (NH)	10,501	6,796	5,555	38.30%	27.82%	24.08%
Black or African American alone (NH)	15,953	16,604	15,834	58.18%	67.96%	68.63%
Native American or Alaska Native alone (NH)	88	52	32	0.32%	0.21%	0.14%
Asian alone (NH)	66	81	80	0.24%	0.33%	0.35%
Native Hawaiian or Pacific Islander alone (NH)	2	4	10	0.01%	0.02%	0.04%
Other race alone (NH)	75	63	120	0.27%	0.26%	0.52%
Mixed race or Multiracial (NH)	511	600	946	1.86%	2.46%	4.10%
Hispanic or Latino (any race)	224	231	493	0.82%	0.95%	2.14%
Total	27,420	24,431	23,070	100.00%	100.00%	100.00%

=== 2020 census ===
As of the 2020 census, Trotwood had a population of 23,070. The median age was 41.9 years. 23.2% of residents were under the age of 18 and 20.6% of residents were 65 years of age or older. For every 100 females there were 81.4 males, and for every 100 females age 18 and over there were 75.6 males age 18 and over.

90.8% of residents lived in urban areas, while 9.2% lived in rural areas.

There were 10,088 households in Trotwood, of which 27.0% had children under the age of 18 living in them. Of all households, 26.5% were married-couple households, 20.3% were households with a male householder and no spouse or partner present, and 46.6% were households with a female householder and no spouse or partner present. About 36.7% of all households were made up of individuals and 17.2% had someone living alone who was 65 years of age or older.

There were 11,741 housing units, of which 14.1% were vacant. The homeowner vacancy rate was 2.5% and the rental vacancy rate was 12.4%.

Racial composition as of the 2020 census
Race	Number	Percent
White	5,631	24.4%
Black or African American	15,923	69.0%
American Indian and Alaska Native	42	0.2%
Asian	87	0.4%
Native Hawaiian and Other Pacific Islander	10	0.0%
Some other race	318	1.4%
Two or more races	1,059	4.6%
Hispanic or Latino (of any race)	493	2.1%

=== 2010 census ===
As of the census of 2010, there were 24,431 people, 10,404 households, and 6,408 families living in the city. The population density was 801.3 inhabitants per square mile (309.4/km^{2}). There were 12,152 housing units at an average density of 398.6 per square mile (153.9/km^{2}). The racial makeup of the city was 28.1% White, 68.2% African American, 0.2% Native American, 0.3% Asian, 0.5% from other races, and 2.6% from two or more races. Hispanic or Latino of any race were 0.9% of the population.

There were 10,404 households, of which 30.0% had children under the age of 18 living with them, 31.5% were married couples living together, 24.8% had a female householder with no husband present, 5.3% had a male householder with no wife present, and 38.4% were non-families. 33.9% of all households were made up of individuals, and 12.8% had someone living alone who was 65 years of age or older. The average household size was 2.29 and the average family size was 2.91.

The median age in the city was 41.8 years. 23.6% of residents were under the age of 18; 8.2% were between the ages of 18 and 24; 21.8% were from 25 to 44; 28.6% were from 45 to 64; and 17.8% were 65 years of age or older. The gender makeup of the city was 44.4% male and 55.6% female.

=== 2000 census ===
As of the census of 2000, there were 27,420 people, 11,110 households, and 7,343 families living in the city. The population density was 898.1 inhabitants per square mile (346.8/km^{2}). There were 12,020 housing units at an average density of 393.7 per square mile (152.0/km^{2}). The racial makeup of the city was 38.66% White, 58.34% African American, 0.32% Native American, 0.24% Asian, 0.01% Pacific Islander, 0.43% from other races, and 1.98% from two or more races. Hispanic or Latino of any race were 0.82% of the population.

There were 11,110 households, out of which 30.3% had children under the age of 18 living with them, 40.3% were married couples living together, 21.5% had a female householder with no husband present, and 33.9% were non-families. 29.8% of all households were made up of individuals, and 10.9% had someone living alone who was 65 years of age or older. The average household size was 2.40 and the average family size was 2.96.

In the city the population was spread out, with 26.2% under the age of 18, 7.5% from 18 to 24, 26.6% from 25 to 44, 23.8% from 45 to 64, and 15.9% who were 65 years of age or older. The median age was 38 years. For every 100 females, there were 83.7 males. For every 100 females age 18 and over, there were 76.7 males.

The median income for a household in the city was $34,931, and the median income for a family was $40,426. Males had a median income of $33,771 versus $26,324 for females. The per capita income for the city was $18,329. About 13.6% of families and 15.3% of the population were below the poverty line, including 22.0% of those under age 18 and 11.3% of those age 65 or over.

== Tourism and attractions ==
Trotwood was the home of Hara Arena, where the annual Dayton Hamvention was held, until Hara Arena closed in 2016. Every year, thousands of Amateur Radio Operators from around the world attend this convention.

Trotwood is also home to United Theological Seminary, one of thirteen seminaries of the United Methodist Church.

Trotwood has two golf courses: Moss Creek, and Hara Greens. Larch Tree Golf Course was sold in 2012 and is no longer a golf course.

== In popular culture ==
Roscoe Filburn, defendant in the 1942 Supreme Court case of Wickard v. Filburn, which permitted the Federal Government to regulate intrastate commerce under the Interstate Commerce Clause, farmed near 5150 Denlinger Road in what is now urban Trotwood.

Trotwood is the alleged childhood home of John Dorian on the television show Scrubs.

== Education ==
Trotwood has a public library, a branch of the Dayton Metro Library.

== Notable residents ==
- Salt Walther, racing driver
- Vincent M. Ward, actor
- Chris Wright, professional basketball player

== See also ==
- Kon-Tiki Theatre (1968–1999)
