= Punderson State Park =

Park in Ohio, USA

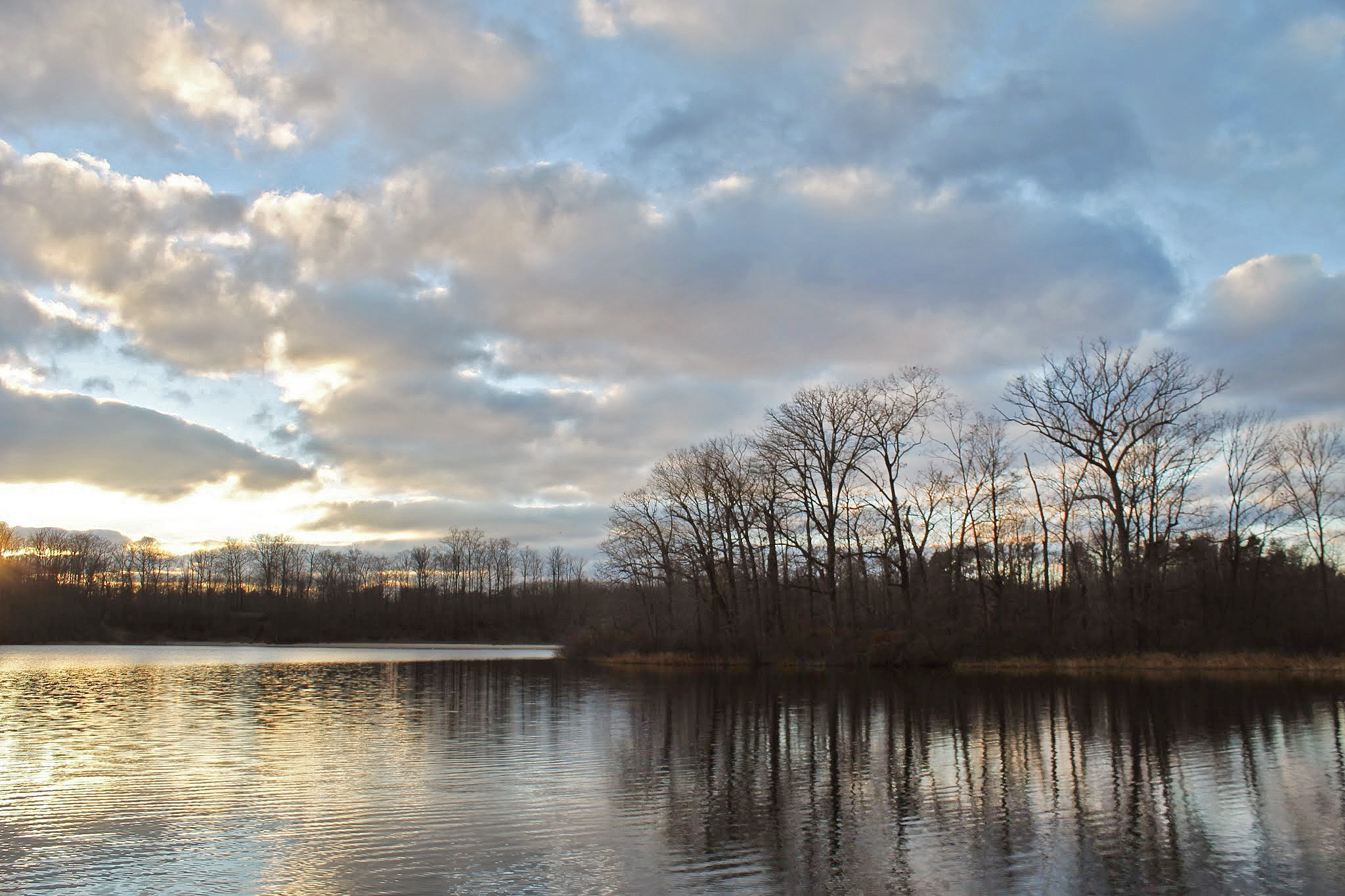
- Sunset, Punderson State Park, December 2014

- Location within Ohio Location within the United States
- Location: Geauga County, Ohio, United States
- Coordinates: 41°27′23″N 81°12′49″W
- Area: 741 acres (300 ha)
- Elevation: 1,171 ft (357 m)
- Established: 1951
- Administrator: Ohio Department of Natural Resources
- Designation: Ohio state park
- Named for: Lemuel Punderson
- Website: Punderson State Park

Punderson State Park is a 741-acre (300 ha) public recreation area in Newbury, Ohio. The state park features a 150-acre (61 ha) lake and a lodge that enjoys a reputation for being haunted. The state park has facilities for swimming, fishing, camping, yurt hurdling, golf, disc golf, and sledding in wintertime.

== History ==
The site was developed as a castle in the early 1800s by land agent Lemuel Punderson, one of the area's first settlers. After summer cottages, a hotel and Tudor-style lodge were constructed, the Ohio Division of Wildlife purchased the land and lake in 1948, then transferred control to the Division of Parks and Recreation for development as a state park in 1951.

== In popular culture ==
On August 22, 1882, the pioneers of Newbury held a reunion on the lake, with a reading of Albert G. Riddle's poem, "Punderson's Pond." Numerous guests at the Manor House have reported over the years that Lemuel Punderson's ghost is haunting the place and that he has frightened several of them.
