= Marie J. Desonier State Nature Preserve =

State Nature Preserve in Athens County, Ohio

Coordinates: 39.2385°N 81.8675°W

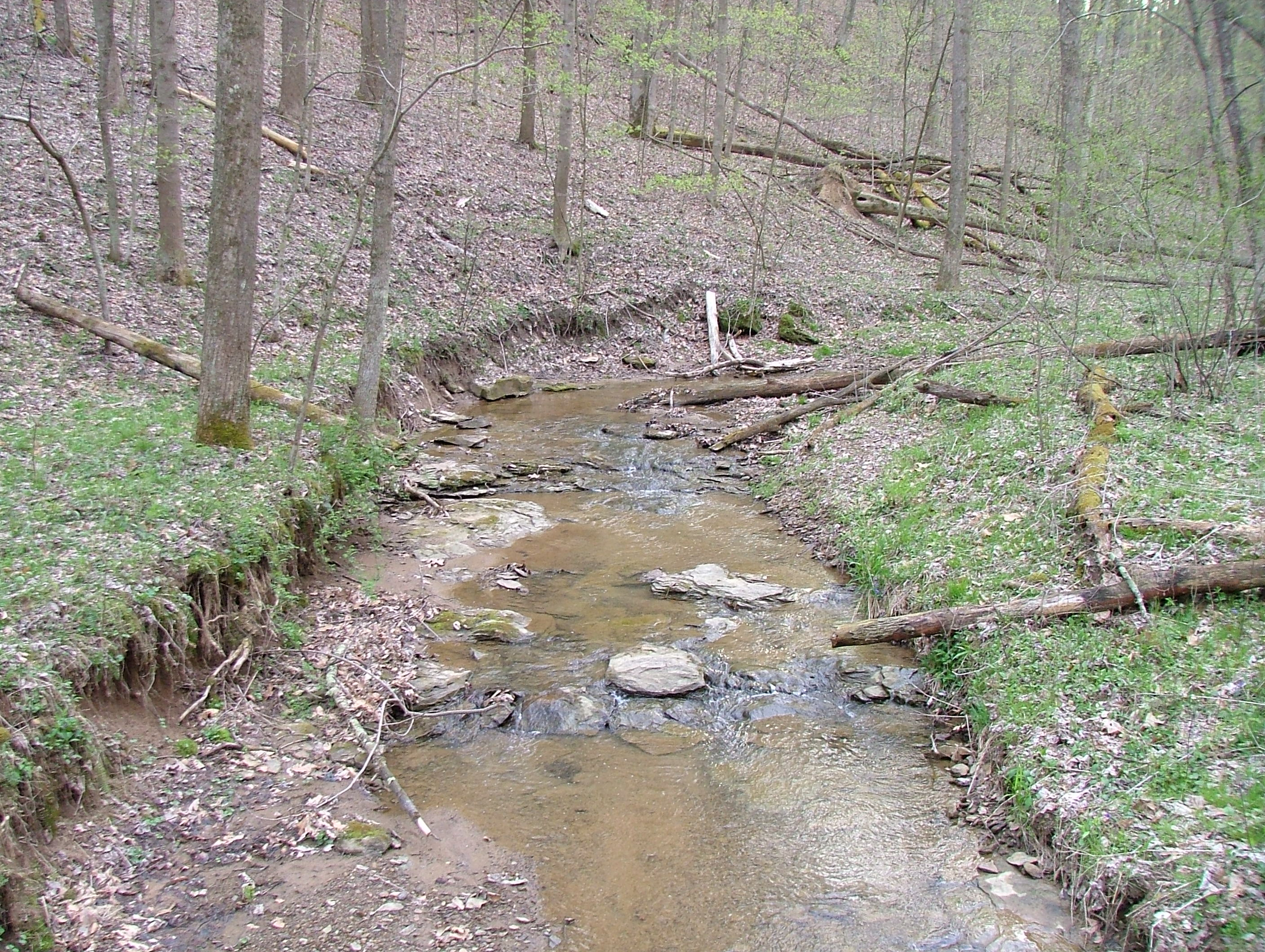
- A tributary of Jordan Run.
- Interactive map of Marie J. Desonier State Nature Preserve
- Location: Athens County, Ohio

Marie J. Desonier State Nature Preserve is located in eastern Athens County, Ohio, United States. It is heavily forested, on Jordan Run near its headwaters, in Deep Hollow. The preserve features a loop trail, the Oak Ridge Trail, with two footbridges. This trail can be hiked in a two-mile (3.2 km), or as a 2.5-mile (4.0 km) loop. There are no other developed facilities there except for a small parking area. The preserve represents a good example of the local forest, with relatively few invasive species.

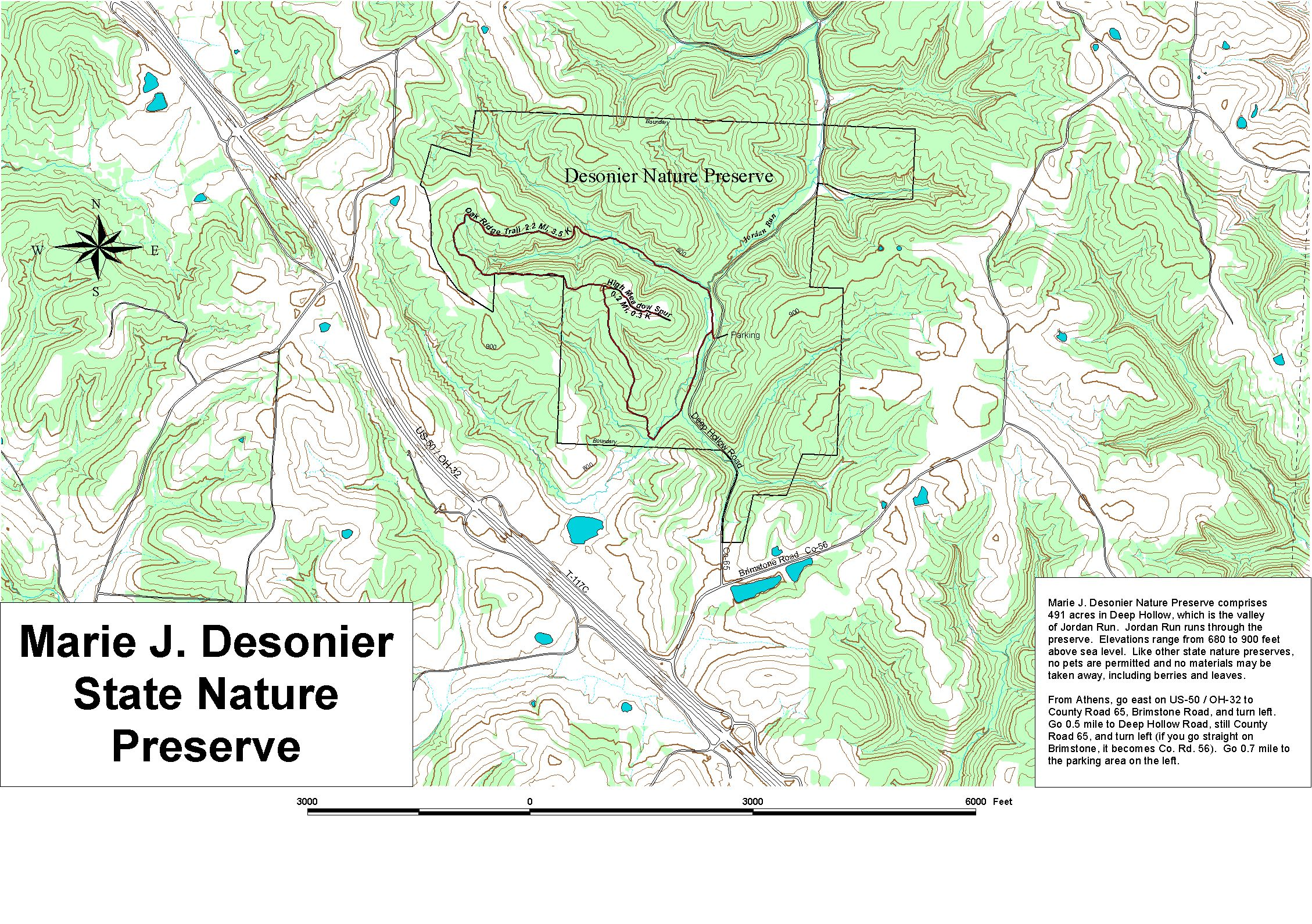

== See also ==
- Ohio public lands
