= Independence Dam State Park =

Park in Ohio, USA

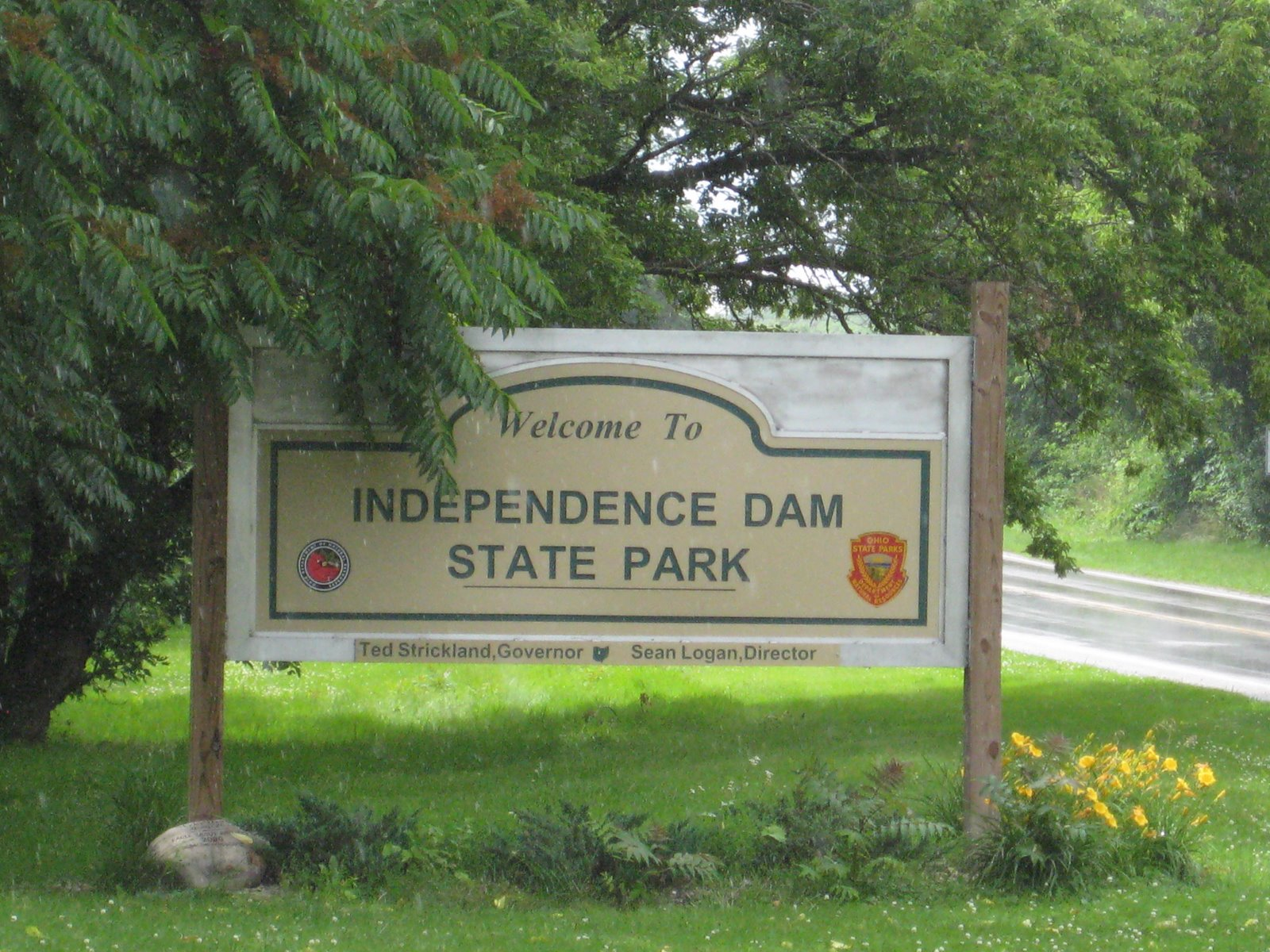
- Entrance sign

- Location within Ohio Location within the United States
- Location: Defiance County, Ohio, United States
- Coordinates: 41°17′38″N 84°16′57″W
- Area: 591 acres (239 ha)
- Elevation: 676 feet (206 m)
- Established: 1949
- Administrator: Ohio Department of Natural Resources
- Designation: Ohio state park
- Website: Independence Dam State Park

Independence Dam State Park is a 591-acre (239 ha) public recreation area located on the banks of the Maumee River three miles east of Defiance in Defiance County, Ohio, United States. The state park features ruins of the Miami and Erie Canal. Recreational features include boating, fishing, hiking, picnicking, and primitive camping.

== History ==
Independence Dam State Park is near the confluence of the Auglaize River and Maumee River. The area has played a key role in the history of northwest Ohio providing a travel route for numerous Indian tribes including the Iroquois, Miami, Lenape, Ottawa, Erie, Wyandot, and Shawnee. Anglo-American explorers were also drawn to the rivers for many of the same reasons as the Native Americans. It provided a reliable source of water as well as an abundance of fish and game.

Two Indian leaders spent part of their lives in the area. Pontiac, an Ottawa leader, is believed to have been born near the confluence of the rivers. He went on to lead what is known as Pontiac's Rebellion against the trade policies of the British rulers in the years following the French and Indian War. Blue Jacket a Shawnee leader made his home in the area. He was a leader in the Northwest Indian War an effort by a united group of tribes to halt the westward expansion of American settlement.

President George Washington dispatched General Anthony Wayne and his army to the Northwest Territory to put down the Indian uprising. After the Native Americans were driven out and west, the land was opened to settlement by Anglo-Americans. Homesteaders arrived soon after. They cleared the land and began farming.

The Miami and Erie and Wabash and Erie Canals passed through the area of Independence State Park. The canals connected the Ohio River with Lake Erie. Cities such as Defiance grew along the banks of the canal. They developed into trade and industrial centers. The canal system thrived for about thirty years in the mid-to-late 19th century before they were replaced by the railroads.

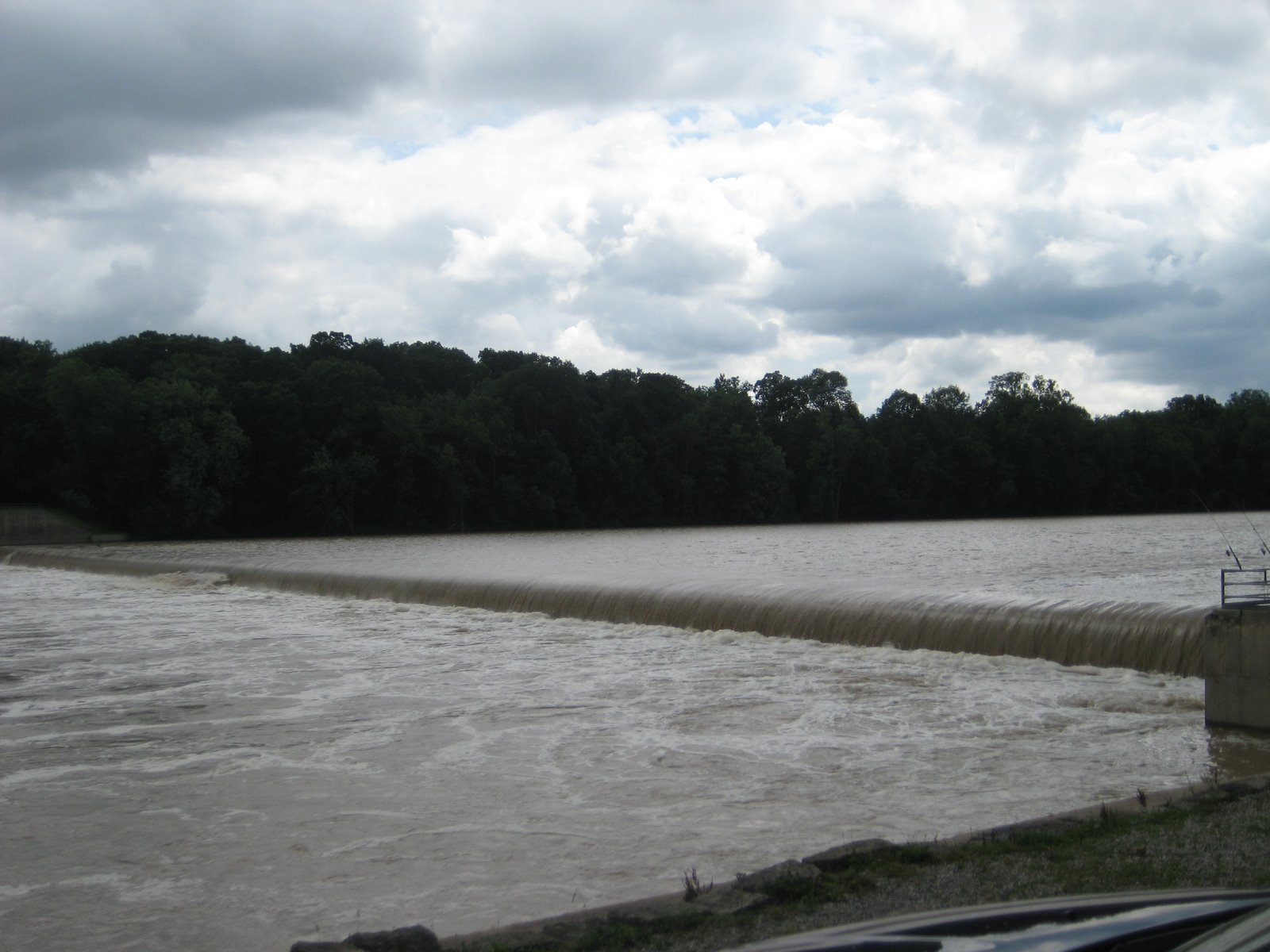
Independence Dam on the Maumee River

A flood in 1913 destroyed much of what remained of the canals. Seven preserved miles of the canal stretch between Independence Dam State Park and County Road 424. The ruins of Lock Number Thirteen of the canal are crossed by the main park entrance.

Independence Dam was built in the 19th century to provide water for the canal system. The original wooden dam was replaced in 1924 by the current concrete dam. At this time several civic organizations began a drive to set aside the land between the river and the canal as a state park. The Ohio Department of Public Works purchased the lands and Independence Dam State Park was opened to the public in 1949.

== Ecology ==
Independence Dam State Park is in the Maumee Valley. This valley has been changed tremendously since it was settled after the Northwest Indian War. It was in the middle of the Great Black Swamp which was 30 to 40 miles (64 km) wide and about 120 miles (190 km) long. It was a heavily forested area that was home to massive sycamore trees that were converted into barns and in some cases homes. Oak and tulip trees were mixed in with the sycamore and walnut. Nearly every tree was cut in less than 100 years after the settlement of Ohio.

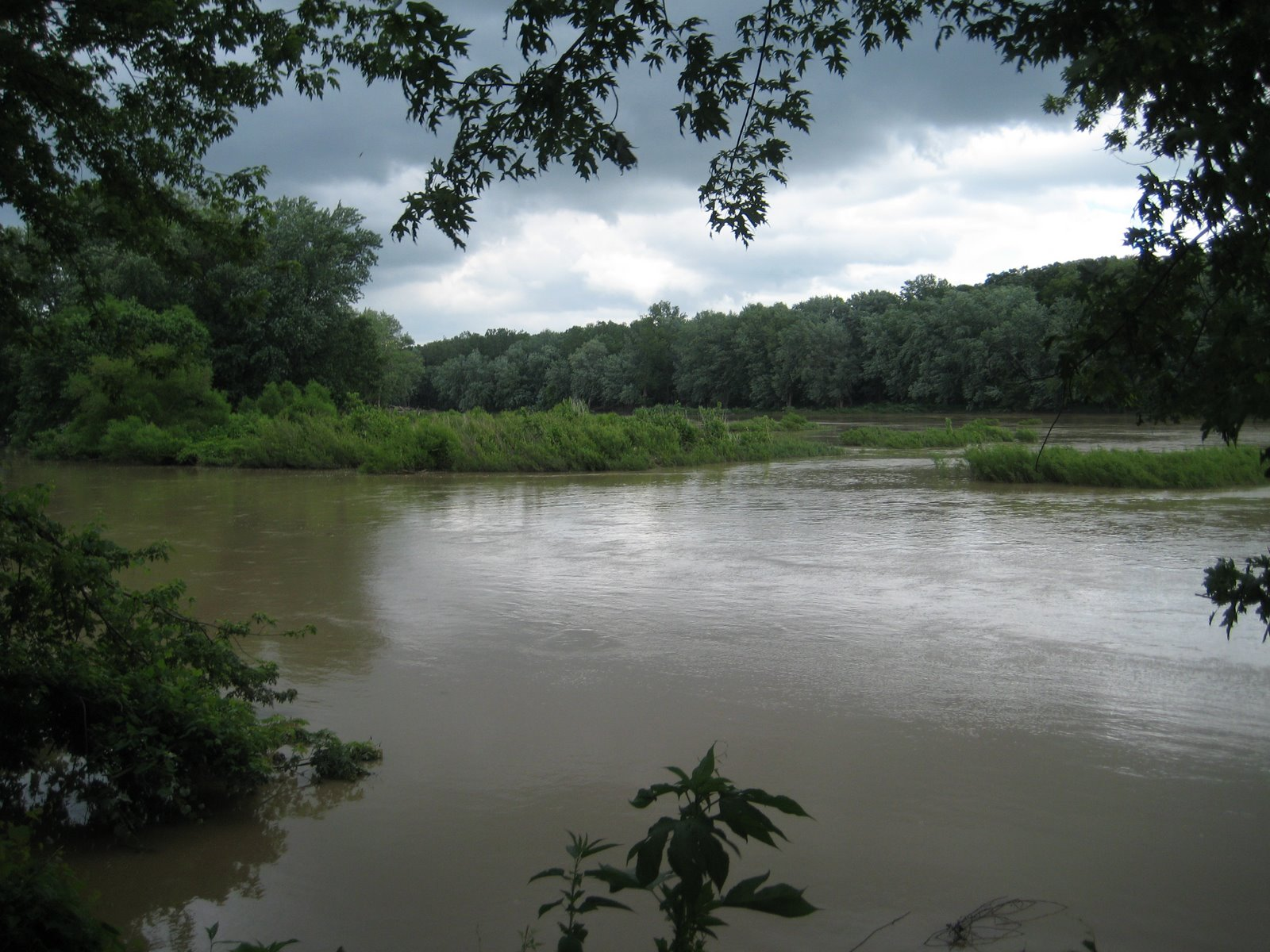
The Maumee River as seen from Independence State Park

The Maumee Valley was one of the last areas of Ohio to be cleared. The swampy ground made it difficult for settlers to enter. The swamp was drained between 1859 and 1875 with a series of ditches and drains. Nearly 2,500,000 acres (10,000 km^{2}) of land were cleared after the swamps were emptied. The region was covered with farms, as it is today, by 1885. Only six percent of the Maumee Valley is now covered with forests, some of this land is in Independence Dam State Park and up and down the Maumee River from the park.

Stands of great sycamore, beech, maple and black locust trees line the river banks. The river banks support a variety of woodland plant and animals including skunks, raccoons, fox squirrels, groundhogs, jewelweed, spring beauties, Louisiana waterthrush, and yellow-throated warblers.

== Recreation ==
The former towpath for the Miami and Erie Canal is used for hiking and biking. The park features a four-lane boat ramp and hand-launches providing access to the Maumee River, which offers water skiing, paddling opportunities, and fishing for northern pike, crappie, walleye, smallmouth bass, and catfish. Picnic tables sit along the river bank. A primitive tent campground was added in 2019.
