= Damascus Township, Ohio =

Township in Ohio, US

Damascus Township, Henry County, Ohio
- Township
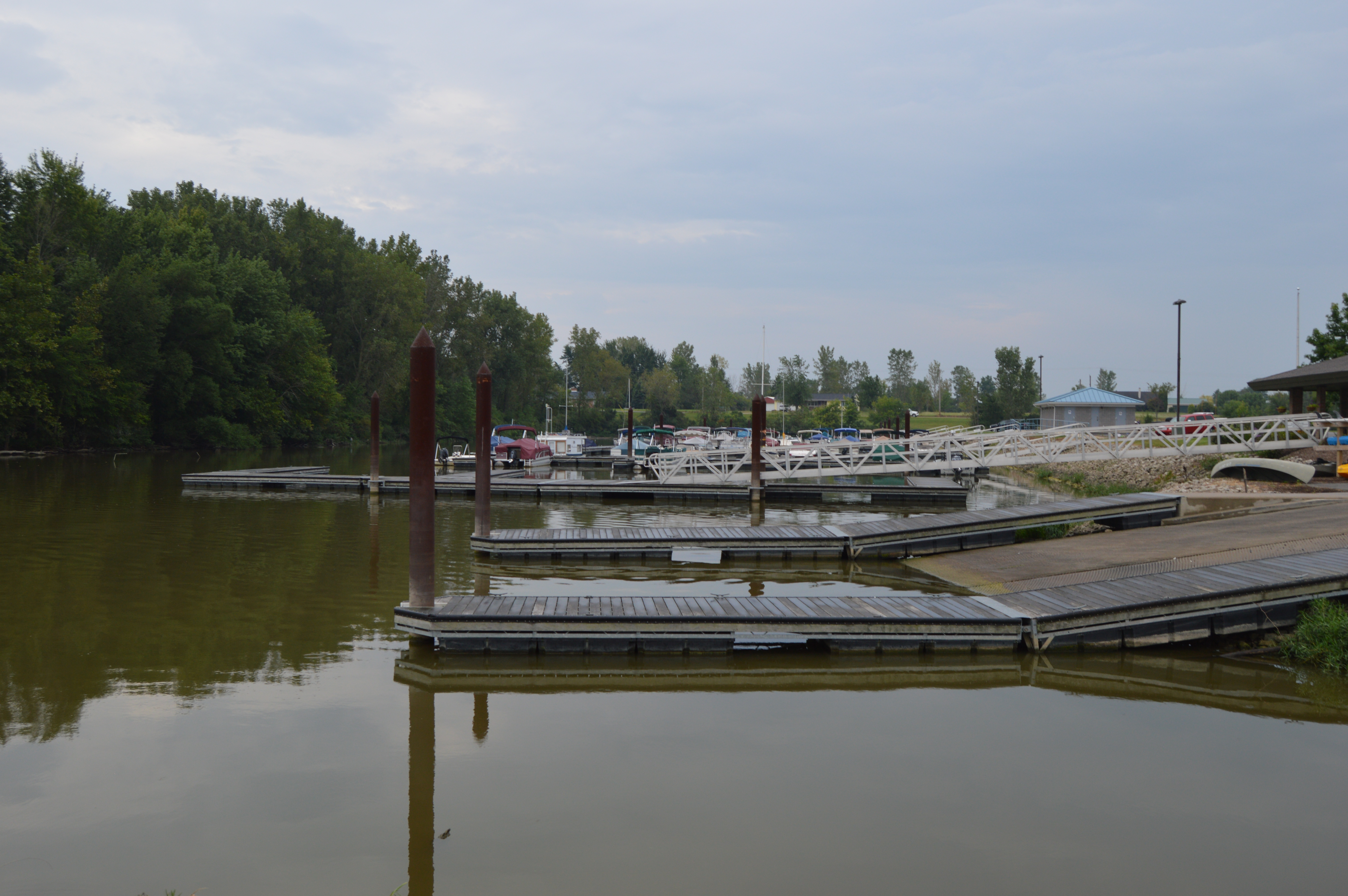
- Quay at Mary Jane Thurston State Park

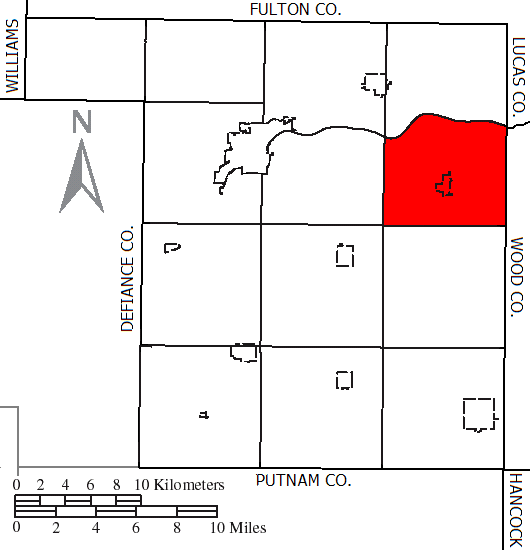
- Location of Damascus Township in Henry County
- Coordinates: 41°22′39″N 83°56′31″W
- Country: United States
- State: Ohio
- County: Henry

Area
  - Total: 30.8 sq mi (79.7 km^{2})
  - Land: 30.1 sq mi (77.9 km^{2})
  - Water: 0.69 sq mi (1.8 km^{2})
- Elevation: 676 ft (206 m)

Population (2020)
  - Total: 1,783
  - Density: 59.3/sq mi (22.9/km^{2})
- Time zone: UTC-5 (Eastern (EST))
  - Summer (DST): UTC-4 (EDT)
- FIPS code: 39-20016
- GNIS feature ID: 1086287

Damascus Township is one of the thirteen townships of Henry County, Ohio, United States. As of the 2020 census the population was 1,783.

== Geography ==
Located in the eastern part of the county, it borders the following townships:

- Washington Township - north
- Providence Township, Lucas County - northeast corner
- Grand Rapids Township, Wood County - east
- Weston Township, Wood County - southeast, between Grand Rapids and Milton Townships
- Milton Township, Wood County - southeast corner
- Richfield Township - south
- Monroe Township - southwest corner
- Harrison Township - west
- Liberty Township - northwest corner

The village of McClure is located in central Damascus Township.

== Name and history ==
It is the only Damascus Township statewide.

== Government ==
The township is governed by a three-member board of trustees, who are elected in November of odd-numbered years to a four-year term beginning on the following January 1. Two are elected in the year after the presidential election and one is elected in the year before it. There is also an elected township fiscal officer, who serves a four-year term beginning on April 1 of the year after the election, which is held in November of the year before the presidential election. Vacancies in the fiscal officership or on the board of trustees are filled by the remaining trustees.
