= Scioto Trail State Park =

State park in Ohio, United States

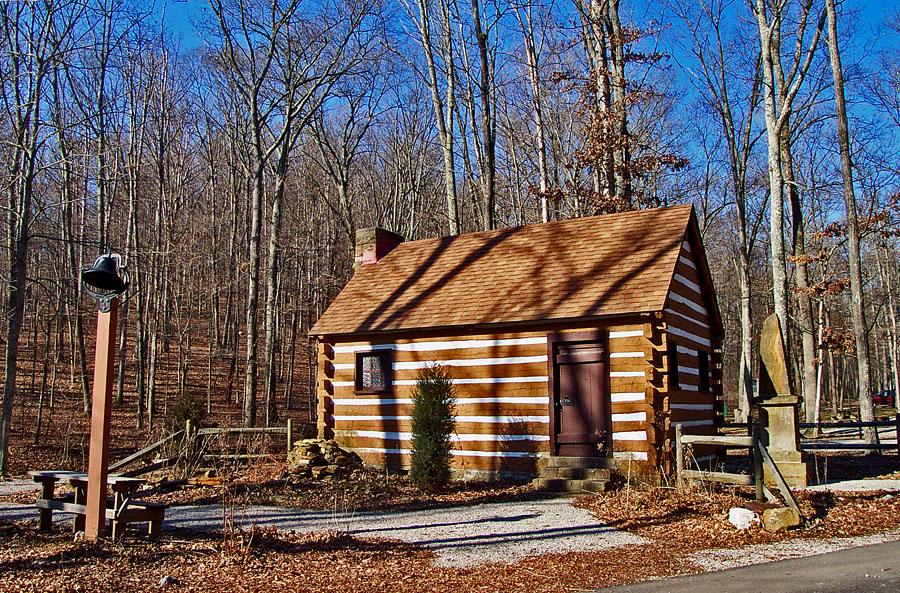
- Reconstructed log church in the park

- Location within Ohio Location within the United States
- Location: Ross County, Ohio, United States
- Coordinates: 39°13′47″N 82°57′44″W
- Area: 218 acres (88 ha)
- Established: 1922
- Administrator: Ohio Department of Natural Resources
- Designation: Ohio state park
- Website: Official website

Scioto Trail State Park is a 218-acre (88 ha) state park located south of Chillicothe in Ross County, Ohio. The park is within the Scioto River valley and is part of the much larger Scioto Trail State Forest. Recreational activities at the park include boating, fishing, and swimming in Caldwell Lake, as well as camping and hiking. The Ohio Department of Natural Resources manages the park.

The park's terrain is hilly and forested, with large numbers of oak and hemlock trees along with dogwood and redbud. Commonly seen wildlife in the park include the gray squirrel, opossum, raccoon, red fox, ruffed grouse, skunk, white-tailed deer, and wild turkey.

The state of Ohio began acquiring the park's land in 1922. The Civilian Conservation Corps' Camp Stoney Creek was based at the park from 1933 to 1937, and it built most of the park's roads and features, including Caldwell Lake itself. The park includes a replica of Chillicothe's First Presbyterian Church building; the congregation itself was founded in 1797, and the log structure was its first permanent home. Near the church is a monument to William Hewitt, a hermit who lived in a nearby cave until his death in 1838.
