= Wolf Creek (Great Miami River tributary) =

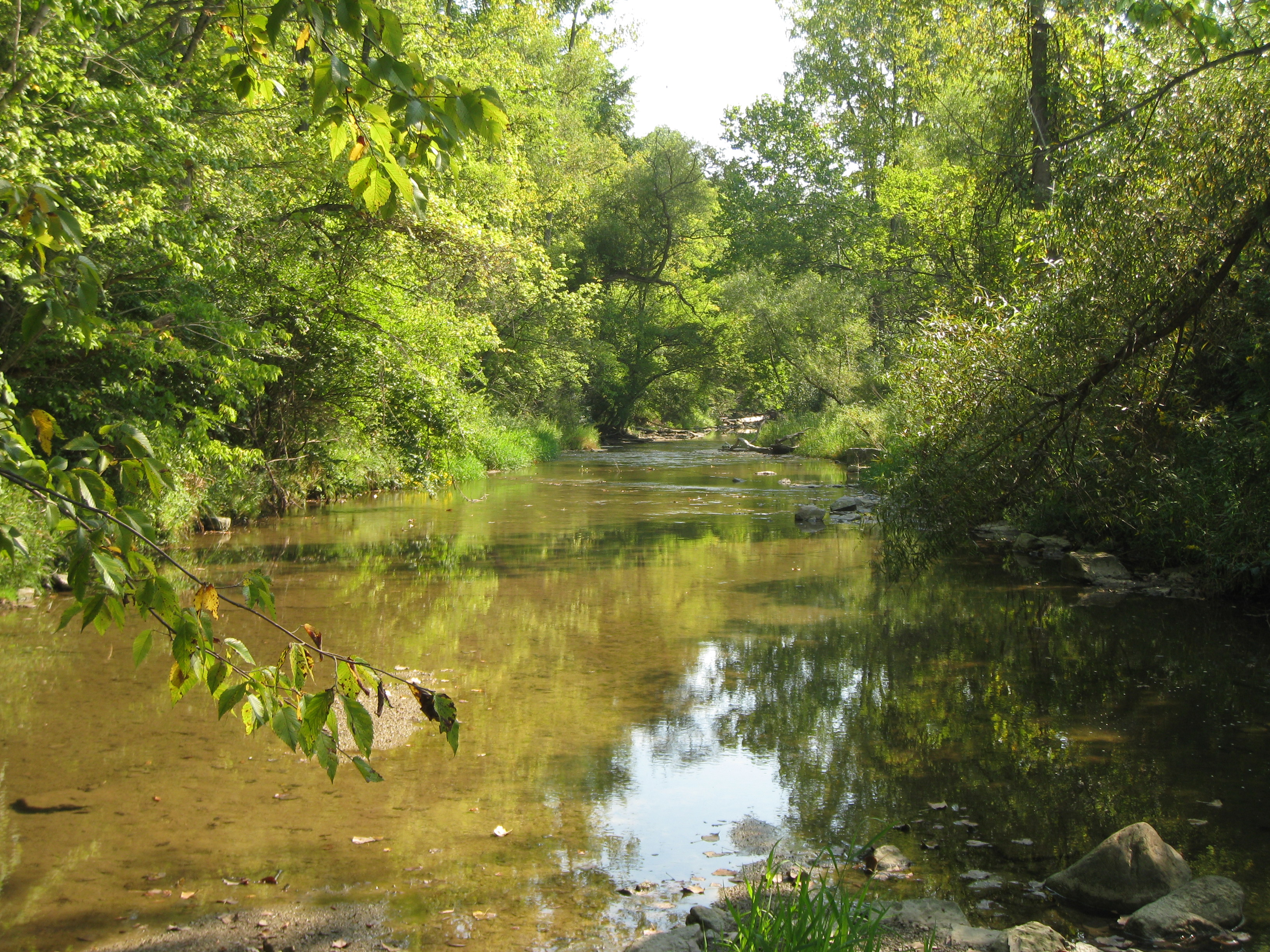
- Wolf Creek in Sycamore State Park

Location
- Country: United States
- State: Ohio
- County: Montgomery
- Cities: Brookville, Trotwood, Dayton

Physical characteristics
- Source: Clay Township, Montgomery County
  - coordinates: 39°52′17″N 84°26′57″W
- Mouth: Confluence with the Great Miami River in Dayton
  - coordinates: 39°45′28″N 84°12′20″W
- Length: 19.8 miles (31.9 km)

Wolf Creek is a 19.8-mile-long (31.9 km) tributary of the Great Miami River in southwestern Ohio in the United States. It rises in western Montgomery County, northwest of Brookville, and flows generally southeast, passing through the center of Trotwood and joining the Great Miami in downtown Dayton.

Wolf Creek was named for the frequent wolves seen there in pioneer days.

It was one of the streams that flooded during the Great Dayton Flood of 1913, resulting in the creation of the Miami Conservancy District.

Sycamore Woods State Park, the only state park in Montgomery County, lies along Wolf Creek. The 3,000-acre (12 km^{2}) park offers horseback riding, hiking, hunting, and group camping.

== Location ==
- Mouth: Confluence with the Great Miami River in Dayton 39°45′28″N 84°12′20″W
- Origin: Clay Township, Montgomery County 39°52′17″N 84°26′57″W

== Other streams ==
The U.S. Geographic Names Information System (GNIS) lists 16 streams named Wolf Creek in Ohio.

== See also ==
- List of rivers of Ohio
