= Mary Jane Thurston State Park =

Park in Ohio, USA

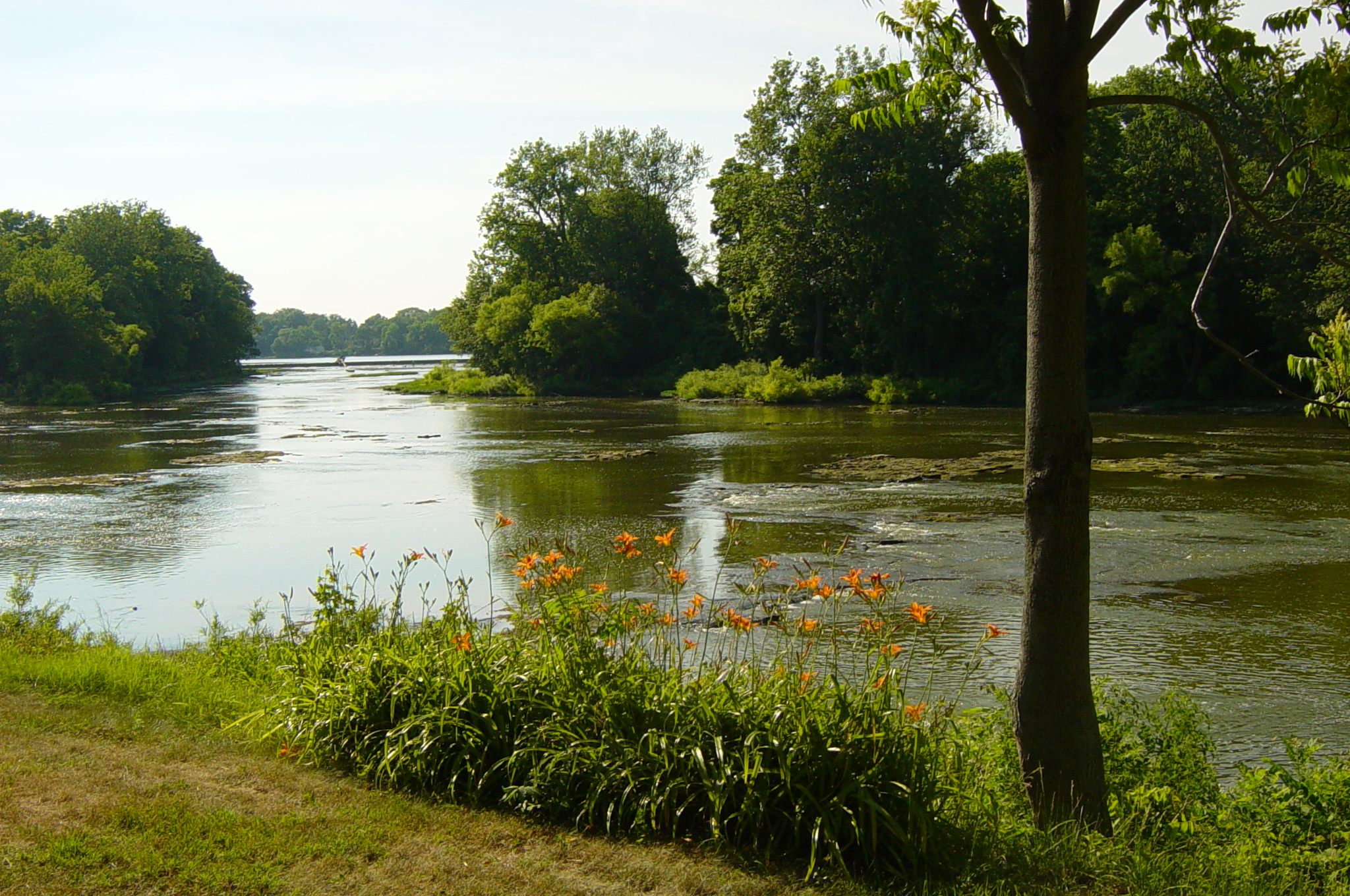
- Maumee River at Mary Jane Thurston State Park

- Location within Ohio Location within the United States
- Location: Wood & Henry counties, Ohio, United States
- Coordinates: 41°24′37″N 83°52′40″W
- Area: 105 acres (42 ha)
- Elevation: 643 feet (196 m)
- Established: 1968
- Administrator: Ohio Department of Natural Resources
- Designation: Ohio state park
- Website: Mary Jane Thurston State Park

Mary Jane Thurston State Park is a 105-acre (42 ha) public recreation area one mile west of Grand Rapids in Wood and Henry counties, Ohio, United States. The state park lies along the south bank of the Maumee River near remains of the historic Miami and Erie Canal. It is named for Mary Jane Thurston, a schoolteacher from Grand Rapids who bequeathed land for the establishment of a park. The park's year-round recreation includes hunting, fishing, boating, picnicking, and camping.

== History ==
The Miami and Erie and Wabash and Erie canals, which connected the Ohio River with Lake Erie, passed through an area now included in the park.

The first 14 acres (5.7 ha) of the state park were donated by the park's namesake, Mary Jane Thurston, who was a teacher in Grand Rapids. Thurston donated her land in 1928 and over a period of 40 years land surrounding the Thurston plot was acquired. The park opened to the public in 1968.

A "Storybook trail" was established at the park in 2021 in collaboration with the Imagination Libraries of Dolly Parton and the Ohio Governor.

== Geography ==
Mary Jane Thurston State Park is in the Maumee Valley. This valley was formerly covered by Lake Maumee which was a remnant of the last ice age. The lake stretched from what is now Fort Wayne, Indiana to western New York state. The waters from Lake Maumee eventually shifted creating Lake Erie and the Maumee Valley was formed.

The Maumee Valley has been changed tremendously since it was settled after the Northwest Indian War. It was in the middle of the Great Black Swamp which was 30 to 40 miles (64 km) wide and about 120 miles (190 km) long. It was a heavily forested area that was home to massive sycamore trees that were converted into barns and in some cases homes. Oak and tulip trees were mixed in with the sycamore and walnut. Nearly every tree was cut in less than 100 years after the settlement of Ohio.

The Maumee Valley was one of the last areas of Ohio to be cleared. The swampy ground made it difficult for settlers to enter. The swamp was drained between 1859 and 1875 with a series of ditches and drains. Nearly 2,500,000 acres (10,000 km^{2}) of land were cleared after the swamps were emptied. The region was covered with farms, as it is today, by 1885. Only six percent of the Maumee Valley is now covered with forests, some of this land is in Mary Jane Thurston State Park and up and down the Maumee River from the park.

== Recreation ==
The park offers camping, boating on the Maumee River, picnicking, hunting, and fishing. Common game animals include white-tailed deer and wild turkeys. The river is home to northern pike, bullhead catfish, smallmouth bass, and crappie. A one-mile stretch of the Buckeye Trail passes through the park.
