= Morris Woods State Nature Preserve =

Coordinates: 40.165°N 82.634°W

Morris State Woods Nature Preserve is located in Johnstown, Ohio, and spans over 100 acres of diverse forestry and wetlands. These serve as a habitat for an array of wildlife and vegetation. The preserve is also used by people for outdoor activities such as bird watching and hiking. The preserve was made possible through a gift by James W. Abbott to the people of Ohio in 1979. The woodland was named after his father Morris Abbott. Originally farmland, the nature preserve was turned into a large forest and natural habitat for various species that are also attracted to the preserve's small lake located within the site.

== History ==
Ohio's Morris Woods State Nature Preserve has faced many challenges, primarily with habitat preservation and management.

In 2004, a group of Boy Scouts came together to build a boardwalk that extended 96 feet long in the front of the preserve, and 24 feet long in the back of the preserve, to earn their Eagle Scout status.

In 1996, Jack McCord, a photographer, located and photographed a bluebird house on the preserve. It is now a popular attraction at the Morris Wood State Nature Reserve. The reserve also serves as a stopover for many waterfowl and some Wood ducks as they migrate towards the north and the south.

== Highlights ==
The Morris Woods State Nature Preserve has some biodiversity due to its variety of natural landscapes. The nature preserve, at about 165 acres, is composed of mature hardwood forests, wetlands, and meadows. These ecosystems add up to a habitat with diverse plant and animal species. The trails offer visitors the chance for bird-watching and observation of various species.

Apart from ecological value, the Preserve offers paths for hikes, jogs, and quiet strolls; however, the Preserve does not allow fishing in its waters, nor dogs on the trails.
