= Deer Creek State Park (Ohio) =

State park in Ohio, United States

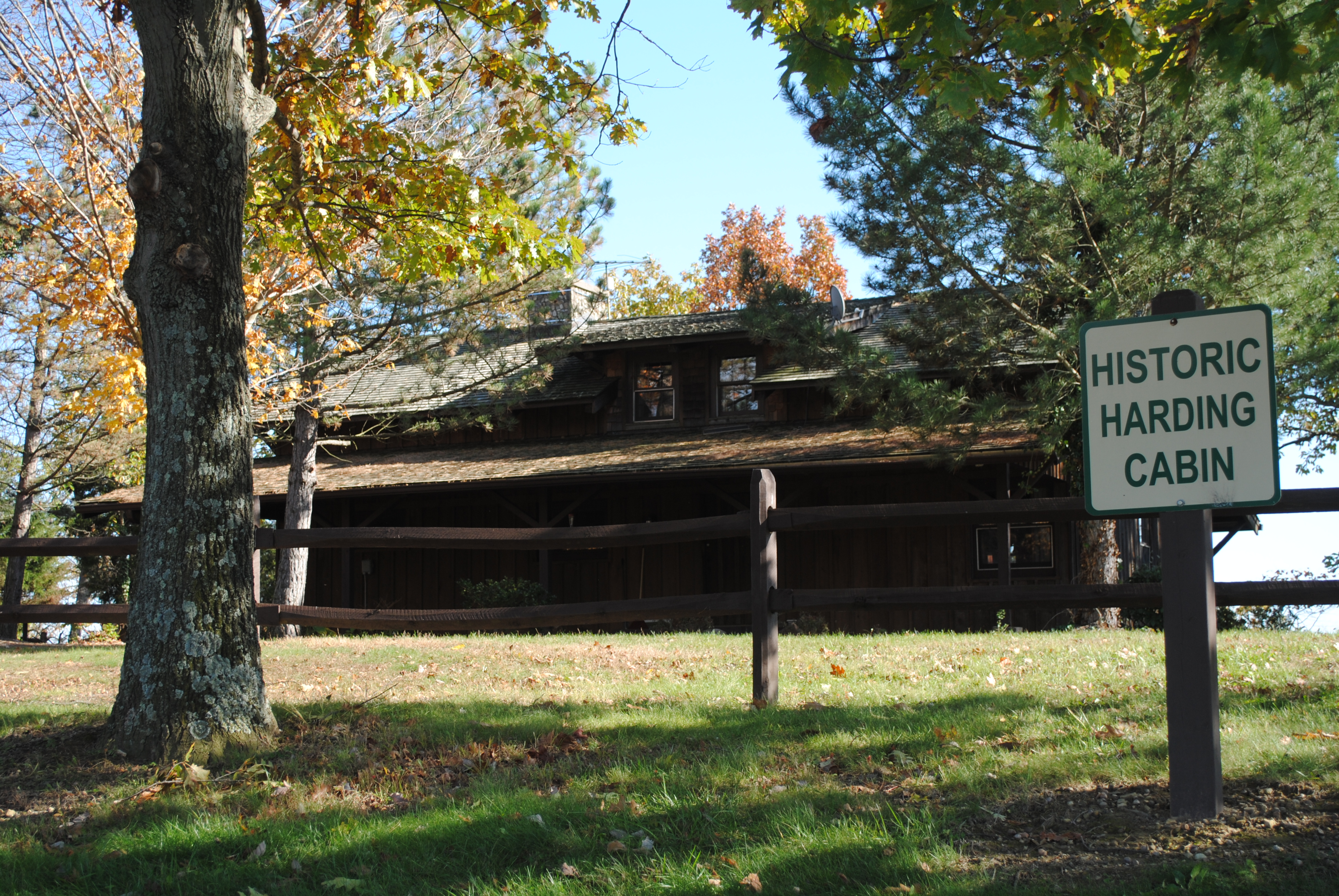
- Harding Cabin

- Location within Ohio Location within the United States
- Location: Fayette County and Pickaway County, Ohio, United States
- Coordinates: 39°38′46″N 83°15′03″W
- Established: 1974
- Administrator: Ohio Department of Natural Resources
- Designation: Ohio state park
- Website: Official website

Deer Creek State Park is a state park located south of Mount Sterling in Fayette and Pickaway counties in the U.S. state of Ohio. The park opened in 1974 and includes a resort, golf course, and reservoir. It is also home to the Harding Cabin, a log cabin owned by President Warren Harding's attorney general Harry M. Daugherty. The Ohio Department of Natural Resources manages the park.

== Attractions ==
The park features a resort with over 100 guest rooms and 25 vacation cabins. The resort includes swimming pools, conference rooms, and common areas with fireplaces. A campground with 232 campsites is also available. An 18-hole golf course is located next to the resort, and a disc golf course is near the campground.

The park's Deer Creek Lake allows boating and has a marina with services and rental facilities. Fishing is permitted on the lake, and commonly caught species include saugeye, catfish, crappie, and largemouth bass. The lake also features a swimming beach. Other park amenities include a nature center, sports courts, and hiking and equestrian trails.

== History ==
The U.S. Army Corps of Engineers created Deer Creek Lake in 1968 by building a dam on Deer Creek. The Ohio Department of Natural Resources established a park on the lake in 1974 and built a new campground for visitors. The park's marina opened in 1978, and its lodge opened in 1981.

The park's Harding Cabin, also known as The Shack, was built in 1918 by Harry M. Daugherty, President Harding's attorney general. Harding himself visited the cabin on several occasions, and local rumors suggest that his Ohio Gang conducted business dealings there.
