= Siegenthaler-Kaestner Esker State Nature Preserve =

Nature preserve in Ohio, United States

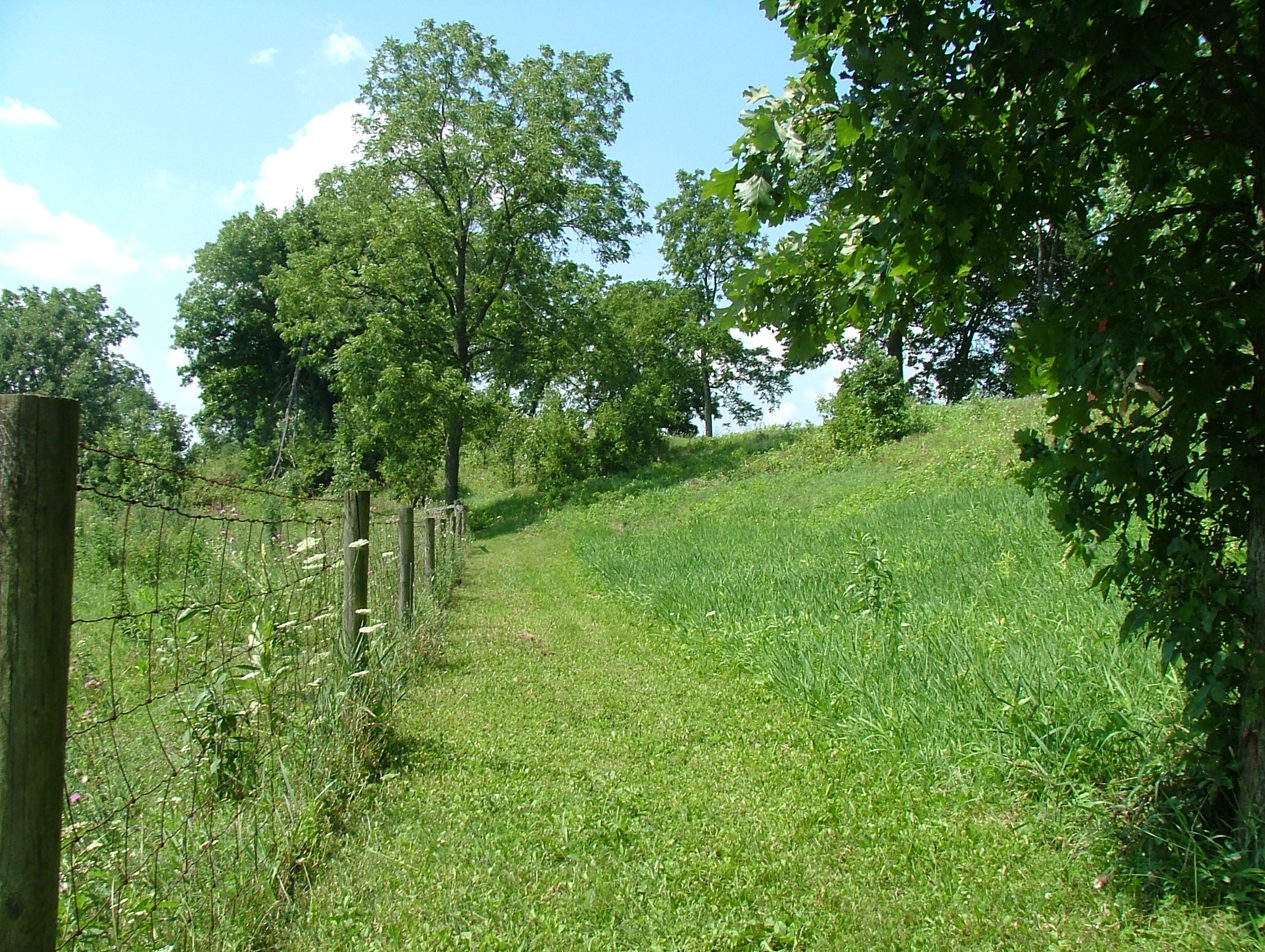
- Side of the esker
- Interactive map of Siegenthaler-Kaestner Esker State Nature Preserve
- Location: Champaign County, Ohio
- Nearest city: West Liberty, Ohio
- Coordinates: 40.2281°N 83.8553°W
- Area: 37-acre (150,000 m^{2})
- Website: ohiodnr.gov/go-and-do/plan-a-visit/find-a-property/siegenthalerkaestner-esker-state-nature-preserve

Siegenthaler-Kaestner Esker is a 37-acre (150,000 m^{2}) state nature preserve located in Champaign County, Ohio, United States. It contains an esker, kame, and kettle, all glacial landforms.

It is an example of a sinuous esker, an ancient ice-walled stream channel which flowed through a Wisconsinan glacier 11,000-25,000 years ago.
