= Scioto Trail State Forest =

Protected forest in Ohio, United States

Coordinates: 39°13′48″N 82°56′24″W

Scioto Trail State Forest is a state forest in Pike and Ross counties in the U.S. state of Ohio. Scioto Trail State Park lies within the state forest.
