= Appalachian mixed mesophytic forests =

Temperate broadleaf and mixed forests ecoregion of the United States

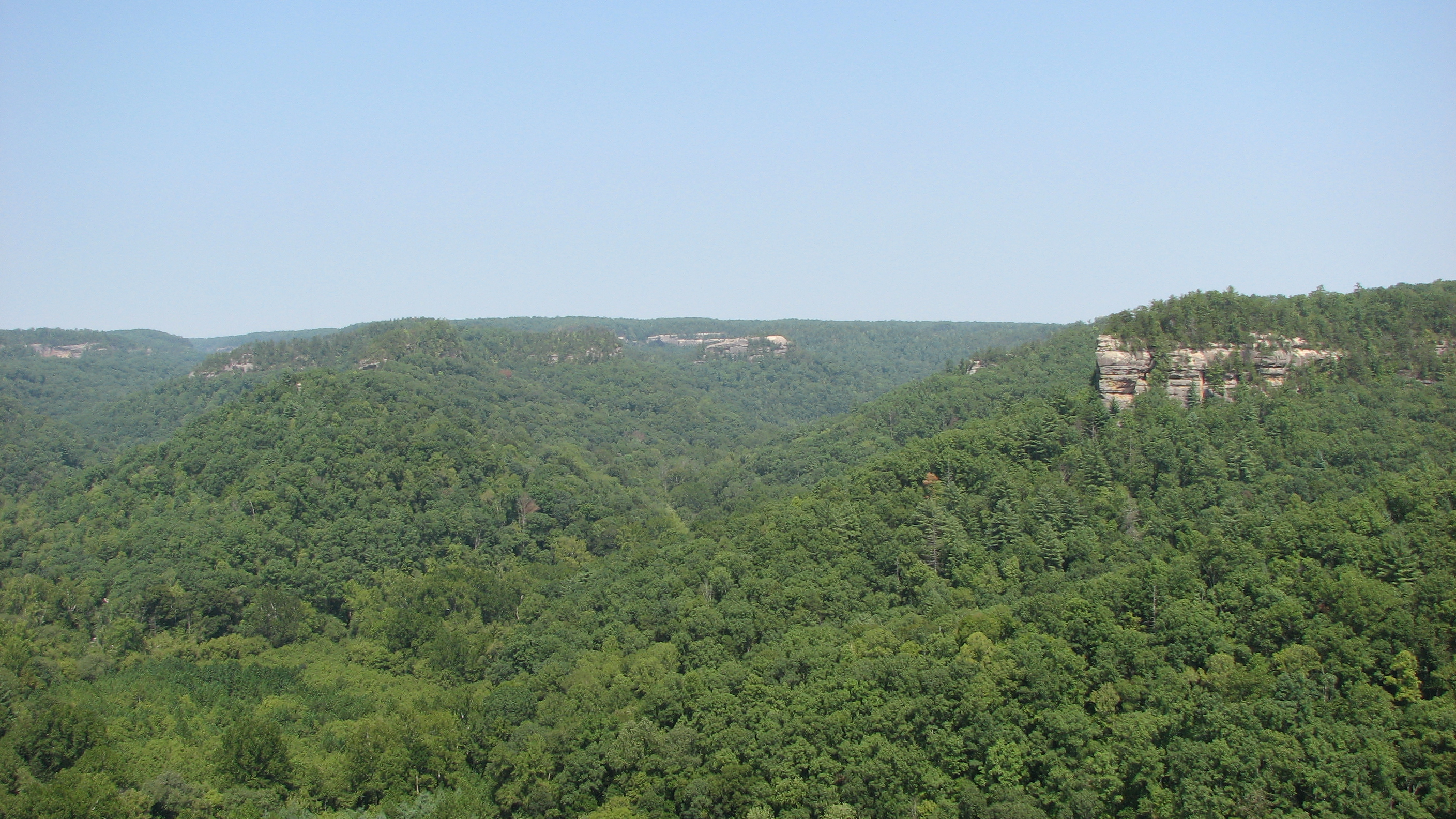
- Hanson's Point in the Red River Gorge, Kentucky

Ecology
- Realm: Nearctic
- Biome: Temperate broadleaf and mixed forest
- Borders: List: Allegheny Highlands forests; Appalachian-Blue Ridge forests; Southeastern mixed forests; Central U.S. hardwood forests; Southern Great Lakes forests
- Bird species: 200
- Mammal species: 73

Geography
- Area: 192,200 km^{2} (74,200 mi^{2})
- Country: United States
- States: List: Pennsylvania; Maryland; Ohio; West Virginia; Kentucky; Virginia; Tennessee; Alabama; Georgia

Conservation
- Global 200: Yes
- Habitat loss: 14.8%
- Protected: 8.37%

The Appalachian mixed mesophytic forests is an ecoregion of the temperate broadleaf and mixed forests biome, as defined by the World Wildlife Fund. It consists of mesophytic plants west of the Appalachian Mountains in the Southeastern United States.

This ecoregion consists of the following EPA level III ecoregions:

- Southwestern Appalachians (ecoregion)
- Central Appalachians (ecoregion)
- Western Allegheny Plateau (ecoregion)

== Setting ==
This ecoregion is located in the plains and hill country west of the Appalachians in northwest Alabama and east central Tennessee, eastern Kentucky, western North Carolina and Virginia, most of West Virginia, western Maryland, southeastern Ohio and western Pennsylvania. This ecoregion also occurs in scattered disjuncts in the Ozark and Ouachita Mountains of Arkansas, Missouri, and extreme eastern Oklahoma. These forests are known for their rich diversity of plants and animals, which is due to several contributing factors, especially that the area was an unglaciated refugium for many species. It shares species with the high elevation Appalachian-Blue Ridge forests to the east, the hardwood forests to the west, and the mixed hardwood/conifer forests to the south.

== Climate ==
The climate of the Appalachian mixed mesophytic forests varies from humid continental (Dfa/Dfb) in the northern part of its range with warm to hot, humid summers and cold, snowy winters to humid subtropical (Cfa) in the southern part of its range with summers having long periods of hot, humid conditions with generally mild winters. The forests receive abundant annual precipitation, ranging from 35 to 80 inches (890 to 2,040 mm), distributed relatively evenly throughout the year.

== Flora ==
They are one of the most biologically diverse temperate forest regions on earth. It has an unusually diverse tree flora, often exceeding 30 tree species at a single site including many relics of the ancient forest that once covered North America more widely. Along with the forest there is a rich undergrowth of ferns, fungi, herbaceous plants, shrubs and small trees as well as areas of glade, heath, shale, peat bog and cranberry bog.

=== Mesophytic forests ===
Mesophytic forests occur in humid and sheltered coves, hollows, lower slopes, areas near small streams, and river valleys along the Allegheny and Cumberland plateaus. The herb layer is very rich and often has abundant spring ephemerals. In undisturbed areas, the canopy trees can grow very large. Typical trees include sugar maple (Acer saccharum), beech (Fagus grandifolia), tuliptree (Liriodendron tulipifera), basswood (Tilia americana), northern red oak (Quercus rubra), American sycamore (Platanus occidentalis), cucumber-tree (Magnolia accuminata), bitternut hickory (Carya cordiformis), pawpaw (Asimina triloba) and black walnut (Juglans nigra). White oak (Quercus alba) and sprouts of American chestnut (Castanea dentata) are common on slightly drier benches. Other trees typically include eastern hemlock (Tsuga canadensis), white ash (Fraxinus americana), sweetgum (Liquidambar styraciflua), black tupelo (Nyssa sylvatica), sweet birch (Betula lenta), river birch (Betula nigra), and yellow buckeye (Aesculus flava).

=== Dry calcareous forests ===
The southern Ridge and Valley/Cumberland dry calcareous forests occur on dry to dry-mesic calcareous habitats on low escarpments of the Cumberland Plateau. They are often found on deep soils in a variety landscapes within their range. Trees are mainly oaks and hickories, with other species less abundant. Oaks include white oak (Quercus alba), northern red oak (Quercus rubra), post oak (Quercus stellata), chinkapin oak (Quercus muehlenbergii), and Shumard oak (Quercus shumardii). Hickories include shagbark hickory (Carya ovata). Other trees can be sugar maple (Acer saccharum), eastern red-cedar (Juniperus virginiana), or pines.

=== Appalachian cove forests ===
Appalachian cove forests are found in sheltered concave slopes with a moist environment. Characteristic tree include yellow buckeye (Aesculus flava), sugar maple (Acer saccharum), white ash (Fraxinus americana), basswood (Tilia americana), tuliptree (Liriodendron tulipifera), Carolina silverbell (Halesia tetraptera), eastern hemlock (Tsuga canadensis), beech (Fagus grandifolia), cucumber tree (Magnolia acuminata), and Fraser magnolia (Magnolia fraseri).

=== Dry-mesic oak forests ===
Dry-mesic oak forests cover large areas at lower and middle elevations on flat to gently rolling terrain. Mature stands have a variety of oak and hickory species adapted to dry-mesic conditions. Oaks include northern red oak (Quercus rubra), white oak (Quercus alba), black oak (Quercus velutina), and scarlet oak (Quercus coccinea); hickories include mockernut hickory (Carya tomentosa), shagbark hickory (Carya ovata), red hickory (Carya ovalis), and pignut hickory (Carya glabra). In addition, red maple (Acer rubrum), sweet birch (Betula lenta), and yellow birch (Betula alleghaniensis) are common; sugar maple (Acer saccharum) is occasional. In areas that have been recently disturbed, white pine (Pinus strobus), Virginia pine (Pinus virginiana), black locust (Robinia psuedoacacia), or tulip tree (Liriodendron tulipifera) can be abundant. Areas of impeded drainage sometimes harbor small wetlands, including non-forested seeps or forested wetlands with red maple (Acer rubrum), swamp white oak (Quercus bicolor), or black tupelo (Nyssa sylvatica). Sprouts of American chestnut (Castanea dentata) are common in these forests.

=== Dry oak forests and woodlands ===
The Allegheny-Cumberland dry oak forest and woodland forest system is found on acidic soils on the Allegheny and Cumberland plateaus, and ridges in the southern Ridge and Valley. The forests are typically dominated by white oak (Quercus alba), southern red oak (Quercus falcata), northern red oak (Quercus rubra), chestnut oak (Quercus montana), scarlet oak (Quercus coccinea), with lesser amounts of red maple (Acer rubrum), pignut hickory (Carya glabra), and mockernut hickory (Carya tomentosa). A few shortleaf pines (Pinus echinata) or Virginia pines (Pinus virginiana) may occur, particularly adjacent to escarpments or following fire. Sprouts of American chestnut (Castanea dentata) can often be found where it was formerly a common tree.

=== Low-elevation pine forests ===
Southern Appalachian low-elevation pine forests occur on a variety of topographic and landscape positions, including ridgetops, upper- and mid-slopes, and in lower elevations (generally below 2,300 feet (700 m)) such as mountain valleys. These forests dominated by shortleaf pine (Pinus echinata) and Virginia pine (Pinus virginiana). Pitch pine (Pinus rigida) may sometimes be present. Hardwoods are sometimes abundant, especially dry-site oaks such as southern red oak (Quercus falcata), chestnut oak (Quercus montana), and scarlet oak (Quercus coccinea), but also pignut hickory (Carya glabra), red maple (Acer rubrum), and others. The shrub layer may be well-developed, with hillside blueberry (Vaccinium pallidum), black huckleberry (Gaylussacia baccata), or other acid-tolerant species most characteristic. Herbs are usually sparse but may include narrowleaf silkgrass (Pityopsis graminifolia) and Goat-rue (Tephrosia virginiana).

=== Montane oak forests ===
Montane oak forests occur on exposed ridges and on south- to west-facing slopes at middle elevations. Soils are thin and nutrient-poor and trees are often stunted and wind-flagged. Northern red oak (Quercus rubra) and white oak (Quercus alba) are common, as are sprouts of American chestnut (Castanea dentata). Winterberry (Ilex montana), flame azalea (Rhododendron calendulaceum), catawba rhododendron (Rhododendron catawbiense), and great rhododendron (Rhododendron maximum) are common shrubs.

=== Hemlock-northern hardwood forests ===
Hemlock-northern hardwood forests are found at higher elevations. They include yellow birch (Betula alleghaniensis), mountain maple (Acer spicatum), sugar maple (Acer saccharum), beech (Fagus grandifolia), and eastern hemlock (Tsuga canadensis). Mountain laurel (Kalmia latifolia) and rhododendron (Rhododendron spp.) are found in the understory.

=== Spruce-fir forests ===
Spruce-fir forests occur at the highest elevations, above 3,200 feet (980 m). Their environment is cool and wet, with frequent fog and precipitation. Red spruce (Picea rubens) and Fraser fir (Abies fraseri) dominate the forest canopy.

=== Bogs ===
Cranberry bogs harbor species typical of ecoregions found to the north. These species include cranberry and blueberry (Vaccinium spp.), bog rosemary (Andromeda glaucophylla), and buckbean (Menyanthes trifoliata). These bogs are relicts that have survived since the last glacial period.

=== Other habitats ===
More unique, restricted habitats within these forests include glades, heath barrens, shale barrens, and sphagnum bogs. These often support endemic plants and land snails.

=== Prehistoric period ===
During the Last Glacial Maximum about 18,000 years ago, the influence of Arctic air masses and boreal vegetation extended to about 33° N. latitude, the approximate latitude of Birmingham and Atlanta. Forests of the glacial period were dominated by various spruces (Picea spp.) and jack pine; fir (Abies spp.) was abundant in some locations. With the exception of the absence of certain prairie elements, the understories of these forests were generally typical of modern spruce-fir forests within and near Canada. Temperate deciduous forests dominated from about 33° to 30° N. latitude, including most of the glacial Gulf Coast from about 84° W. longitude. Regional climate was similar to or slightly drier than modern conditions. Oak, hickory, chestnut, and southern pine species were abundant. Walnuts, beech, sweetgum, alder, birch, tulip poplar, elms, hornbeams (Carpinus spp.), basswoods, and others that are generally common in modern southern deciduous forests were also common then. Grasses, sedges, and sunflowers were also common.

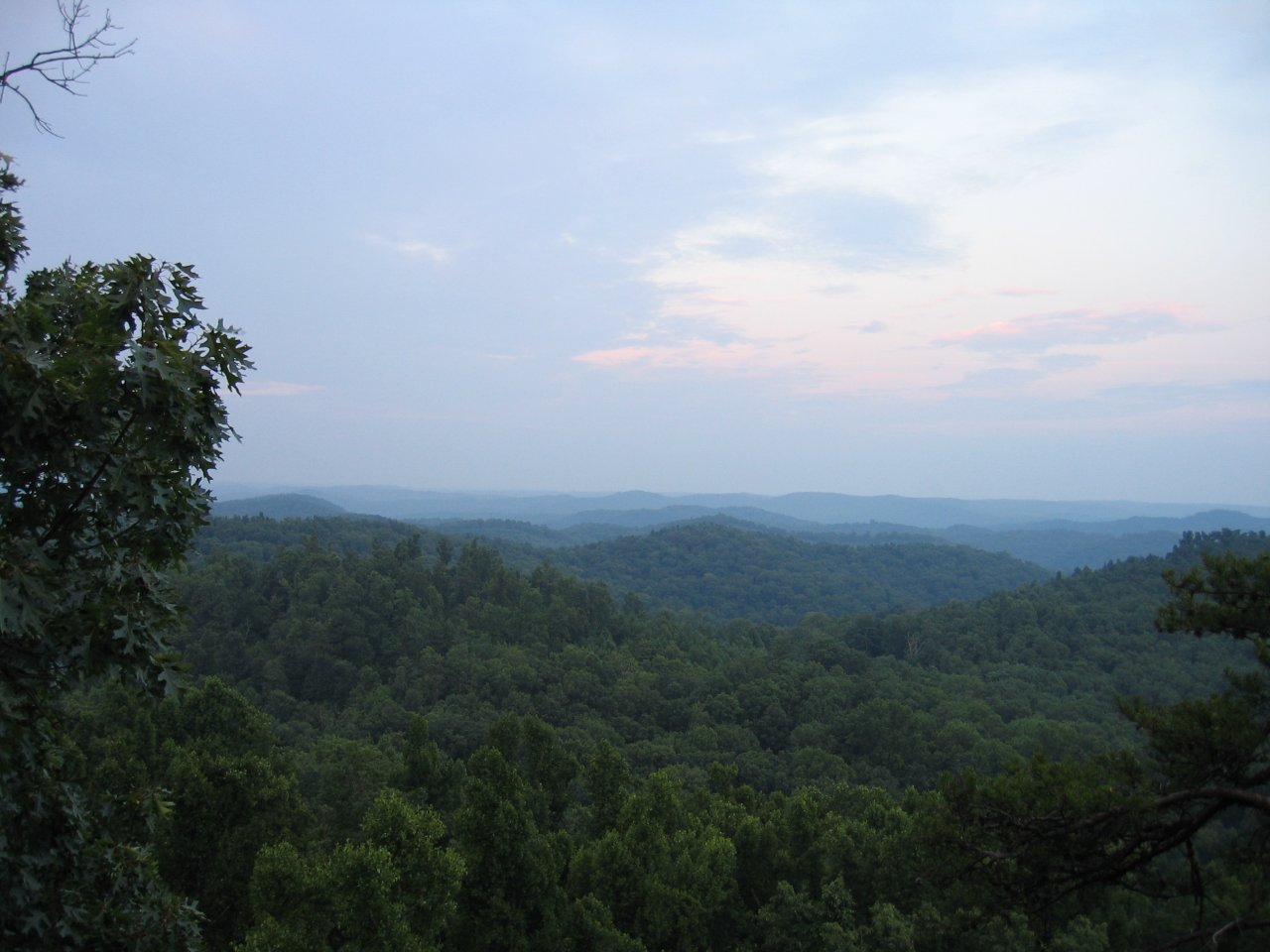
Daniel Boone National Forest in Kentucky

== Fauna ==
The woodlands of the area are rich in wildlife. In particular they are important habitat for migrating birds including wood warblers, vireos, and thrushes. The rivers of the ecoregion have the highest species richness of any freshwater ecosystem. In particular, there are a large number of endemic fish and shellfish species.

== Threats ==
This ecoregion is considered critically endangered with 95% of the habitat degraded or converted to commercial forest. Large areas have been destroyed and fragmented through surface mining, including mountaintop removal. Large areas have also been logged and then converted to plantations of fast-growing tree species, such as loblolly pine (Pinus taeda) which are then used to produce wood pulp, which is particularly a problem in the Cumberland Plateau of Tennessee. Another threat to habitats come from growing numbers of deer. Major rivers in the ecoregion, such as the Tennessee River, have been dammed. This has resulted in the threatened or endangered status of many species of native fish, amphibians, and shellfish.

== Natural areas ==
The remaining forest is mostly found in protected areas.

- Alabama
  - Monte Sano State Park
  - Oak Mountain State Park
  - Talladega National Forest
    - Cheaha Wilderness
  - William B. Bankhead National Forest
    - Sipsey Wilderness
- Georgia
  - Cloudland Canyon State Park
- Kentucky
  - Blanton Forest State Nature Preserve
  - Big South Fork National River and Recreation Area
  - Cumberland Gap National Historical Park
  - Daniel Boone National Forest
    - Beaver Creek Wilderness
  - Kentenia State Forest
  - Kentucky Ridge State Forest
  - Robinson Forest
- Maryland
  - Garrett State Forest
  - Potomac State Forest
- Ohio
  - Ales Run Wilderness Area
  - Beaver Creek State Park
  - Blue Rock State Forest
  - Brush Creek State Forest
  - Brush Creek Wilderness Area
  - Burr Oak State Park
  - Clear Creek Nature Preserve
  - Crown City Wildlife Area
  - Dean State Forets
  - Egypt Valley Wilderness Area
  - Fernwood State Forest
  - Highlandtown Wilderness Area
  - Hocking State Forest
  - Mohican-Memorial State Forest
  - Muskingum River State Park
  - Perry State Forest
  - Pike State Forest
  - Salt Fork State Park
  - Shade River State Forest
  - Shawnee State Forest
  - Strouds Run State Park
  - Tar Hollow State Forest
  - Tri-Valley Wilderness Area
  - Wayne National Forest
  - Wolf Creek Wilderness Area
  - Woodybury State Wilderness Area
  - Zaleski State Forest
- Pennsylvania
  - Black Moshannon State Park
  - Forbes State Forest
  - Gallitzin State Forest
  - Laurel Hill State Park
  - Laurel Ridge State Park
  - Moraine State Park
  - Mount Davis Natural Area
  - Ohiopyle State Park
  - Prince Gallitzin State Park
  - Quebec Run Wild Area
  - Raccoon Creek State Park
  - Roaring Run Natural Area
- Tennessee
  - Big South Fork National River and Recreation Area
  - Catoosa Wildlife Management Area
  - Fall Creek Falls State Park
  - Frozen Head State Park
  - Prentice Cooper State Forest
  - Scott State Forest
  - South Cumberland Recreation Area
  - South Cumberland State Park
- Virginia
  - Parts of Jefferson National Forest
    - Stone Mountain Wilderness
- West Virginia
  - Babcock State Park
  - Beech Fork State Park
  - Blackwater Falls State Park
  - Canaan Valley National Wildlife Refuge
  - Canaan Valley Resort State Park
  - Cedar Creek State Park
  - Chief Logan State Park
  - Coopers Rock State Forest
  - Gauley River National Recreation Area
  - Holly River State Park
  - Kanawha State Forest
  - Monongahela National Forest
    - Cranberry Wilderness
    - Dolly Sods Wilderness
    - Otter Creek Wilderness
    - Roaring Plains West Wilderness

== See also ==
- Appalachian temperate rainforest
- Beech-maple forest
- Boreal forest
- Oak-heath forest
- Oak-hickory forest
- Northern hardwood forest
- Western Allegheny Plateau ecoregion: WWF sub−ecoregion on the western Allegheny Plateau.
- List of ecoregions in the United States (WWF)
- List of ecoregions in the United States (EPA)

== Bibliography ==
- "Appalachian mixed mesophytic forests". Terrestrial Ecoregions. World Wildlife Fund.
- World Wildlife Fund, ed. (2001). "Appalachian mixed mesophytic forests". WildWorld Ecoregion Profile. National Geographic Society. Archived from the original on 2010-03-08.
- Appalachian mixed mesophytic forests images at bioimages.vanderbilt.edu
- Owen, Wayne (2002). "Chapter 2 (TERRA–2): The History of Native Plant Communities in the South". Southern Forest Resource Assessment Final Report. U.S. Department of Agriculture, Forest Service, Southern Research Station. Archived from the original on January 26, 2004.
- Data source for map: Olson, D. M. and E. Dinerstein. The Global 200: Priority ecoregions for global conservation. (PDF file) Annals of the Missouri Botanical Garden 89: pgs. 125-126.
