= American Discovery Trail =

Long-distance hiking trail across the United States

Coordinates: 39°37′32″N 105°46′56″W

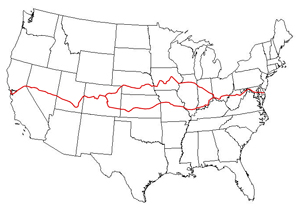
- The American Discovery Trail, including its northern and southern routes
- Length: 6,800 mi (10,900 km)
- Location: United States
- Trailheads: Cape Henlopen, Delaware; Limantour Beach, California
- Use: Hiking, Horseback Riding, Mountain Biking
- Highest point: Argentine Pass, 13,207 ft (4,025 m)
- Lowest point: California Delta between Isleton and Antioch, −17 ft (−5.2 m)
- Difficulty: Easy to Strenuous
- Season: All year
- Sights: National Parks, National Forests
- Hazards: Severe Weather

The American Discovery Trail is a system of recreational trails and roads that collectively form a coast-to-coast hiking and biking trail across the mid-tier of the United States. Horses can also be ridden on much of this trail. The coastal trailheads are the Delmarva Peninsula on the Atlantic Ocean and the northern California coast on the Pacific Ocean. The trail has northern and southern alternates for part of its distance, passing through Chicago or St. Louis respectively. The total length of the trail, including both the north and south routes, is 6,800 miles (10,900 km). The northern route covers 4,834 miles (7,780 km) with the southern route being 5,057 miles (8,138 km). It is the only non-motorized coast-to-coast trail in the United States.

The trail passes through at least 14 national parks and 16 national forests and uses sections of or connects to five National Scenic Trails, 10 National Historic Trails, and 23 National Recreation Trails. For part of its distance, it is coincident with the North Country Trail, the Buckeye Trail, the Continental Divide Trail, and the Colorado Trail.

The trail passes through the District of Columbia and the following 15 states:

- Delaware (45 miles (72 km))
- Maryland (270 miles (430 km))
- West Virginia (288 miles (463 km))
- Ohio (524 miles (843 km))
- Indiana (250 miles (400 km))
- Illinois (219 miles (352 km))
- Kentucky (8.7 miles (14.0 km))
- Iowa (512 miles (824 km))
- Missouri (343 miles (552 km))
- Nebraska (523 miles (842 km))
- Kansas (570 miles (920 km))
- Colorado (1,153 miles (1,856 km))
- Utah (593 miles (954 km))
- Nevada (496 miles (798 km))
- California (276 miles (444 km))

== Hiking records ==
ADT Society's official trail logo

Joyce and Pete Cottrell, of Whitefield, New Hampshire, were the first to backpack the entire official route of the American Discovery Trail. They hiked the segments out of sequence over two calendar years, finishing in 2003.

The first hikers to complete the trail in one continuous walk were Marcia and Ken Powers, a wife and husband team from Pleasanton, California. Their trail walk lasted from February 27 to October 15, 2005. They started out from Cape Henlopen State Park in Delaware and ended at Point Reyes, California. They traveled 5,058 miles (8,140 km) by foot, averaging 22 miles (35 km) a day.

The first person to backpack the entire 6,800 miles (10,944 km) (including both Northern and Southern sections) in one continuous hike was Mike "Lion King" Daniel. He started from Cape Henlopen State Park on June 17, 2007, and ended at Point Reyes, California, on November 5, 2008. The first woman to backpack the entire 6,800 miles (10,944 km) solo in one continuous hike was Briana DeSanctis. She started on January 1, 2022, and ended her journey on February 10, 2024.

The first person to cover the entire equestrian route on horseback was Matt Parker. He undertook the journey between May 2003 and November 2005.

== Notable locations ==
At Cedar Rapids, a mural was posted on Greene Square in 2019 to mark both the American Discovery Trail, which passes through downtown, and the Cedar Lake-Smokestack Bridge project.

The following notable locations are found along or adjacent to the route of the American Discovery Trail, organized from east to west.

- Cape Henlopen State Park, the eastern terminus of the trail in Delaware.
- Argentine Pass, Colorado, the highest point in the trail where it crosses the Rockies.
- Limantour Beach, Point Reyes, the western terminus of the trail in California.

== Other affiliated locations ==
The following locations are found along or adjacent to the route of the American Discovery Trail, organized by state from east to west.

=== Delaware ===
==== Affiliated trails ====
- Cape Henlopen Bike Trail
- Georgetown-Lewes Trail

==== Forests ====
- Redden State Forest

==== Parks ====
- Cape Henlopen State Park

==== Points of interest ====
- Historic towns of Lewes and Milton

=== Maryland ===
==== Affiliated trails ====
- Love Point to Lewes, DE "Smuggler's Trail" formerly Queen Anne's Railroad
- Washington, Baltimore and Annapolis (WB&A) Rail Trail
- Baltimore and Annapolis (B&A) Trail
- East Coast Greenway
- Anacostia Tributary Trails
- Fort Circle Trail
- Capital Crescent Trail
- Rock Creek Park Trail
- Appalachian National Scenic Trail
- Potomac Heritage National Scenic Trail
- Allegheny Highlands Trail
- Star Spangled Banner National Historic Trail
- Captain John Smith Chesapeake National Historic Trail

==== Parks ====
- Martinak State Park
- Tuckahoe State Park, Adkins Arboretum
- Horsehead Wetlands Center (Wildfowl viewing)
- Sandy Point State Park
- Greenbelt Park
- Rock Creek Park
- Chesapeake & Ohio Canal National Historical Park

=== West Virginia ===
==== Affiliated trails ====
- North Bend Rail Trail
- Harrison County Rail-Trail
- Dryfork Rail-Trail
- Allegheny Trail

==== Forests ====
- Monongahela National Forest

==== Parks ====
- Harpers Ferry National Historic Park
- Canaan Valley Resort State Park
- Tygart Lake State Park
- Blackwater Falls State Park
- North Bend State Park

=== Ohio ===
==== Affiliated trails ====
- Buckeye Trail
- Burr Oak Loop Trail
- Robert and Mary Lou Paton Trail in Burr Oak State Park
- Grandma Gatewood Trail in Hocking Hills State Park
- Perimeter Trail in East Fork Park
- The Riverwalk in Cincinnati
- The Shaker Trace in Miami-Whitewater Forest Hamilton County Park
- Hueston Woods State Park Trails
  - Hedgeapple Trail
  - Big Woods Trail
  - Sugar Bush Trail
  - West Shore Trail in Hueston Woods State Park

==== Forests ====
- Wayne National Forest
- Hocking State Forest
- Tar Hollow State Forest
- Scioto Trail State Forest
- Pike State Forest
- Shawnee State Forest

==== Parks ====
- Burr Oak State Park
- Logan State Park
- Hocking Hills State Park
- Tar Hollow State Park
- Scioto Trail State Park
- Pike Lake State Park
- Fort Hill State Memorial
- Serpent Mound State Memorial
- Davis Memorial
- Shawnee State Park
- Grant Lake St. Mary's State Park
- East Fork State Park
- Little Miami River State Park
- Eden Park
- Bicentennial Common in Cincinnati
- Devou park (Kentucky)
- Harrison's Tomb
- Miami - Whitewater Forest Hamilton County Park
- Indian Creek Preserve
- Gov. Bebb Butler County Metropark
- Hueston Woods State Park

=== Indiana (Northern route) ===
==== Affiliated trails ====
- Whitewater Gorge National Recreation Trail
- Cardinal Greenway
- North Judson Erie Trail
- Nickel Plate Trail

==== Parks ====
- Tippecanoe River State Park
- Summit Lake State Park

=== Indiana (Southern route) ===
==== Affiliated trails ====
- Pigeon Creek Greenway
- Knobstone Trail
- Two Lakes Trail
- Adventure Trail
- Burdette Park/University of Southern Indiana Pedestrian, Bicycle, and Nature Trail
- Heritage Trail of Madison

==== Forests ====
- Clark State Forest
- Harrison-Crawford State Forest
- Hoosier National Forest

==== Parks ====
- Burdette Park
- Clifty Falls State Park
- Lincoln State Park
- Falls of the Ohio State Park
- O'Bannon Woods State Park

=== Illinois (Northern route) ===
==== Affiliated trails ====
- Old Plank Road Trail
- Illinois and Michigan Canal State Trail
- Grand Illinois Trail
- Sauk Trail Forest Preserve Trail
- Thorn Creek Trail
- Hennepin Canal Parkway State Trail
- Great River Trail

==== Parks ====
- Indian Boundary Park
- Dewey Helmick Nature Preserve
- Hickory Creek Bikeway Trailhead Park
- Channahon State Park
- McKinley Woods State Park
- William G. Stratton State Park
- Gebhard Woods State Park
- Illini State Park
- Starved Rock State Park
- Buffalo Rock State Park
- Matthiessen State Park
- Hennepin Canal Parkway State Park

=== Illinois (Southern route) ===
==== Affiliated trails ====
- River to River Trail
- Metro-East Levee Trail
- Tunnel Hill State Trail

==== Forests ====
- Shawnee National Forest

==== Parks ====
- Devil's Backbone Park
- Ferne Clyffe State Park
- Giant City State Park
- Cave In Rock State Park

=== Iowa (Northern route) ===
==== Affiliated trails ====
- Riverfront Trail
- Hoover Nature Trail
- Cedar River Trail
- Cedar Valley Nature Trail
- Cedar Valley Lakes Trail
- Pioneer Trail
- Comet Trail
- Heart of Iowa Nature Trail
- Saylorville-Des Moines River Trail
- Raccoon River Valley Trail
- T-Bone Trail
- Wabash Trace Trail

==== Parks ====
- Deerwood Park
- George Wyth State Park
- Wild Cat Den State Park
- Pleasant Creek State Park

=== Missouri (Southern route) ===
==== Affiliated trails ====
- Katy Trail
- Lewis and Clark National Historic Trail
- Rock Island Spur

==== Forests ====
- Daniel Boone State Forest
- Baltimore Bend State Forest

==== Parks ====
- Forest Park
- Missouri State Park
- Frontier Park
- Swope Park
- Arrow Rock State Historic Site
- Van Meter State Park

=== Nebraska (Northern route) ===
==== Affiliated trails ====
- Pony Express National Historic Trail
- Mormon Pioneer National Historic Trail
- MoPac East Trail
- Oak Creek Trail
- Lewis and Clark National Historic Trail
- California National Historic Trail
- Oregon National Historic Trail

==== Parks ====
- Fort Kearny State Historical Park
- Ash Hollow State Historical Park
- Buffalo Bill Ranch State Historical Park

=== Kansas (Southern route) ===
==== Affiliated trails ====
- Santa Fe National Historic Trail

==== Parks ====
- Shawnee Mission Park
- Clinton State Park

=== Colorado ===
==== Affiliated trails ====
- Pueblo Riverwalk
- Canon City Riverwalk
- Cripple Creek Trails System
- Ute Pass Trail
- America The Beautiful Trail
- Green Mountain Falls Bikeway
- Sinton Trail
- Pikes Peak Greenway
- New Santa Fe Trail
- Carpenter Peak Trail
- Chatfield Trails System
- South Platte River Trail
- Bear Creek Greenway
- Castle Trail
- People's Path
- Warren Gulch Trail
- Spring Creek Trail
- South Park Trail
- Burning Bear Trail
- Hall Valley Trail
- Colorado Trail
- Vail Pass Tenmile Canyon National Recreation Trail
- Chalk Creek Trail
- Continental Divide National Scenic Trail
- Timberline Trail
- Taylor Pass Trail
- Brush Creek Trail
- Crystal River Trail
- Braderick Creek Trail
- Lake Ridge Lakes Trail
- High Trail
- Sunlight-Powderhorn Snowmobile Trail
- Leon Lake Trail
- Crag Crest National Recreation Trail
- Kannah Creek Trail
- Old Spanish Trail
- Colorado Riverfront Trail
- Liberty Cap Trail
- Black Ridge Trail
- Monument Canyon Trail
- Kokopelli's Trail
- Fountain Creek Greenway
- Cavalier Park Trail

==== Forests ====
- Pike National Forest
- Arapaho National Forest
- San Isabel National Forest
- Gunnison National Forest
- White River National Forest
- Grand Mesa National Forest

==== Parks ====
- John Martin Reservoir State Park
- Lake Pueblo State Park
- Mueller State Park
- Garden of the Gods Park
- Roxborough State Park
- Chatfield State Park
- Bear Creek Regional Park
- Mount Falcon Park
- O'Fallon Denver Mountain Park
- Elk Meadow Park

=== Utah ===
==== Affiliated trails ====
- Kokopelli's Trail
- Great Western Trail
- Paiute ATV Trail
- Oak Creek Trail
- Lockhart Basin Trail
- Hurrah Pass Trail

==== Forests ====
- Dixie National Forest
- Fishlake National Forest
- Manti-La Sal National Forest

==== Parks ====
- Canyonlands National Park
- Capitol Reef National Park

=== Nevada ===
==== Affiliated trails ====
- Tahoe Rim Trail
- Pony Express National Historic Trail
- Mount Jefferson Trail
- Toiyabe National Recreation Trail

==== Forests ====
- Humboldt-Toiyabe National Forest

==== Parks ====
- Great Basin National Park
- Cave Lake State Park
- Ward Charcoal Ovens State Historic Park
- Currant Mountain Wilderness
- Alta Toquima Wilderness
- Arc Dome Wilderness
- Berlin-Ichthyosaur State Park
- Sand Mountain Recreation Area
- Grimes Point National Historic Site
- Fort Churchill State Historic Park
- Washoe Lake State Park
- Mt. Rose Wilderness
- Lake Tahoe State Park
- Table Mountain Wilderness

=== California ===
==== Affiliated trails ====
- Tahoe Rim Trail
- Western States Trail
- Pacific Crest Trail
- Foresthill Loop Trail
- Confluence Trail
- Pioneer Express Trail
- American River Bike Trail
- Jedediah Smith National Recreation Trail
- Delta de Anza Regional Trail
- Stewartville Trail
- Ridge Trail
- Black Diamond Trail
- Cumberland Trail
- Black Diamond to Mt. Diablo Trail
- Bruce Lee Trail
- Mitchell Canyon Trail
- Deer Flat Creek Trail
- Prospectors Gap Trail
- North Peak Trail
- Summit Trail
- Wall Point Trail
- Briones-Mount Diablo Trail
- Lafayette Ridge Trail
- Homestead Valley Trail
- Oursan Trail
- Bear Creek Trail
- Inspiration Trail
- Bay Area Ridge Trail
- Sea View Trail
- Vollmer Peak Trail
- Grizzly Peak Trail
- San Francisco Bay Trail
- SCA Trail
- Bobcat Trail
- Miwok Trail
- Redwood Creek Trail
- Deer Creek Park Fire Trail
- Hillside Trail
- Ben Johnson Trail
- Stapleveldt Trail
- Matt Davis Trail
- Coastal Trail
- Bolinas Ridge Trail
- Randall Trail
- Olema Valley Trail
- Stewart Trail
- Glen Trail
- Bear Valley Trail
- Coast Trail
- Mokelumne Coast to Crest Trail

==== Parks ====
- Granite Chief Wilderness
- Auburn State Recreation Area
- Folsom Lake State Recreation Area
- American River Parkway
- Discovery Park
- William Land Park
- Contra Loma Regional Park
- Black Diamond Mines Regional Preserve
- Mt. Diablo State Park
- Shell Ridge Open Space
- Heather Farms Park
- Acalanes Ridge Open Space
- Briones Regional Park
- Wildcat Canyon Regional Park
- Tilden Regional Park
- Presidio of San Francisco
- Golden Gate National Recreation Area
- Muir Woods National Monument
- Mount Tamalpais State Park
- Point Reyes National Seashore

== See also ==
- American Perimeter Trail
