= Harrison County State Forest =

Harrison County State Forest may refer to:

- Harrison–Crawford State Forest in Indiana
- Harrison State Forest in Ohio
