= Western Allegheny Plateau (ecoregion) =

Ecoregion in the United States

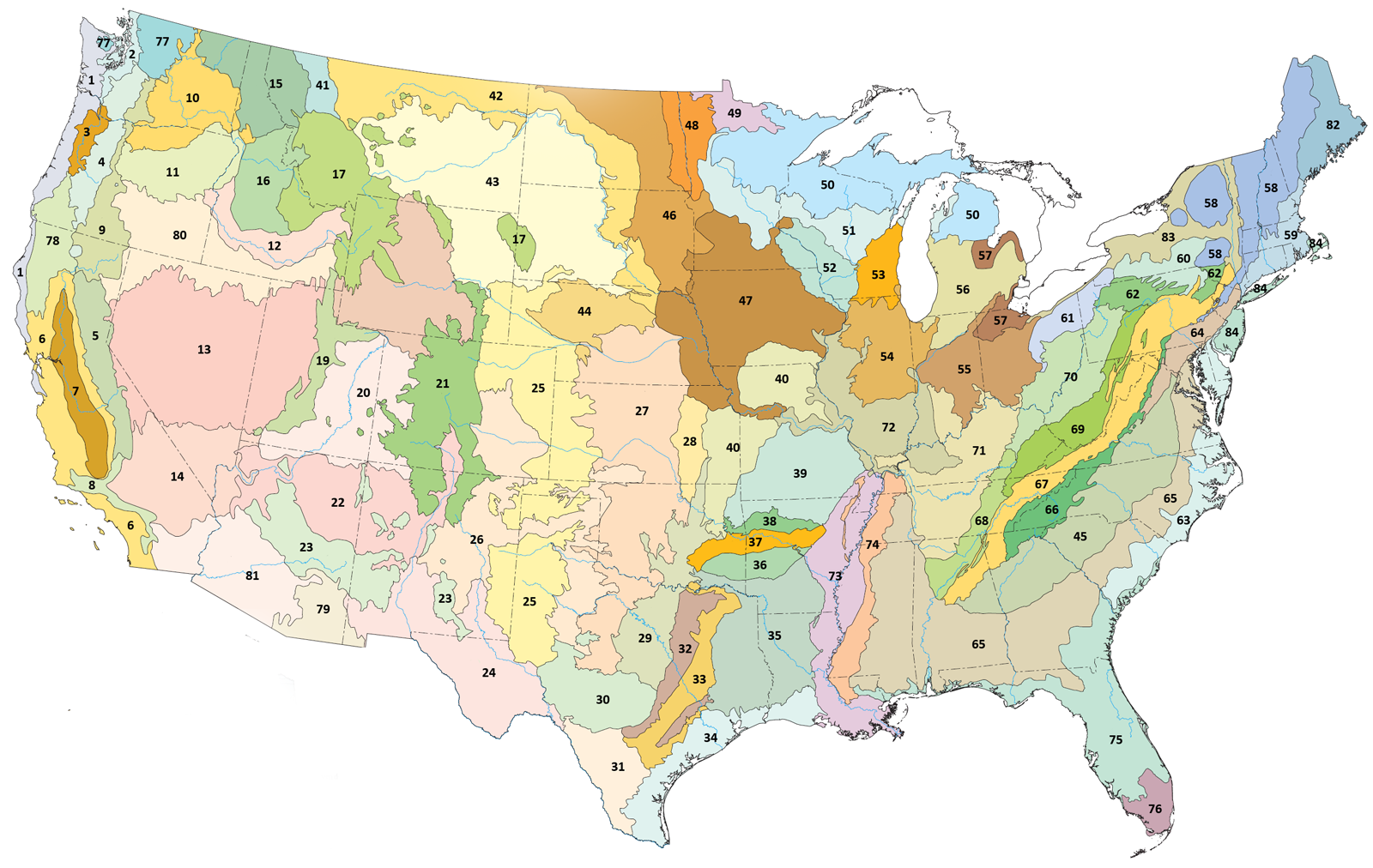
- Western Allegheny Plateau (area 70 on the map)

Ecology
- Realm: Nearctic
- Biome: Temperate broadleaf and mixed forests
- Bird species
- Mammal species

Geography
- Country: United States
- State: West Virginia, Pennsylvania, Ohio, Kentucky

The Western Allegheny Plateau is an ecoregion of the Temperate broadleaf and mixed forests Biome, located on the western Allegheny Plateau and in the Appalachia region of the Eastern United States.

== Geography ==
The Western Allegheny Plateau ecoregion is located on the western Allegheny Plateau, which is within the central region of the Appalachian Plateau.

The World Wildlife Fund defines the ecoregion as being the northern part of the Appalachian mixed mesophytic forests.

The Environmental Protection Agency defines it as running from west-central Pennsylvania, east-central and south Ohio, north and northwest West Virginia, and a portion of northeast Kentucky.

The ecoregion covers approximately 84,500 km2 (32,630 mi2). It is about 72 percent forest and 23 percent agriculture. Coal mining is still active in the Pennsylvania, West Virginia, and Kentucky portions of the ecoregion, and in Appalachian Ohio to a lesser extent.

=== Larger cities in the ecoregion ===
- Pittsburgh, Pennsylvania + Pittsburgh metropolitan area
- Ashland, Kentucky
- Charleston, West Virginia
- Chillicothe, Ohio
- Clarksburg, West Virginia
- Coshocton, Ohio
- East Liverpool, Ohio
- Greensburg, Pennsylvania
- Huntington, West Virginia
- Marietta, Ohio
- New Philadelphia, Ohio
- Portsmouth, Ohio
- Steubenville, Ohio
- Wheeling, West Virginia
- Zanesville, Ohio

== Ecology ==
=== Flora ===
The forest area is mostly mixed oak and mixed temperate forests.

Native plant species include:

- Acer rubrum (Red maple )
- Betula alleghaniensis (Yellow birch)
- Betula nigra (Black birch)
- Fagus grandifolia (American beech)
- Fraxinus americana (White ash)
- Diervilla lonicera (Northern bush honeysuckle)
- Pinus strobus (White pine)
- Populus grandidentata (Big-tooth American aspen)
- Prunus pensylvanica (Pin cherry)
- Prunus serotina (Black cherry)
- Tsuga canadensis (Hemlock)

Between 1890 and 1920, loggers cleared most of the Allegheny Plateau. Save for a few pockets of old growth forest, the current forests, which contain most of the presettlement species in different relative abundances and distribution, originated at that time. The heavy cutting favored hardwoods and created massive amounts of coniferous slash, providing ideal conditions for widespread and intense fires. The fires were a major factor in the virtual elimination of white pine and hemlock in the Allegheny forests. Repeated fires also tended to reduce the proportion of sugar maple, beech, and other typical hardwoods and increase such species as aspen, pin cherry, sedges, grasses, and honeysuckles.

=== Fauna ===
The Ohio River and Allegheny River systems within the ecoregion have been adversely affected by acid mine drainage and industrial pollution, which has caused degradation of the stream and riparian habitats, and loss of native fish species.

Prevalent mammal species of the ecoregion are: white-tailed deer, cottontail rabbit, groundhog, and wild turkey.

Wildlife of lesser relative abundance are: gray and fox squirrel, gray fox, raccoons, opossum, red fox, and striped skunk.

== Conservation ==
For the state of Ohio portion of the ecoregion, the Ohio Department of Natural Resources Division of Wildlife maintains state listed wildlife that are considered endangered, threatened, species of concern, special interest, extirpated, or extinct.

== See also ==
- Allegheny Highlands forests ecoregion
- Appalachian mixed mesophytic forests
- Ecology of the Appalachian Mountains
- Plant communities of the Eastern United States
- List of ecoregions in the United States (EPA)
- List of ecoregions in the United States (WWF)
- Temperate broadleaf and mixed forests ecoregions in the United States
