= Forked Run State Park =

Park in Ohio, USA

- Location within Ohio Location within the United States
- Location: Meigs County, Ohio, United States
- Coordinates: 39°06′05″N 81°47′15″W
- Area: 791 acres (320 ha)
- Elevation: 686 feet (209 m)
- Established: 1951
- Administrator: Ohio Department of Natural Resources
- Designation: Ohio state park
- Website: Forked Run State Park

Forked Run State Park is a public recreation area located three miles (4.8 km) south of Reedsville in eastern Meigs County, Ohio, United States. The state park's area is 791 acres (320 ha), while the lake covers 102 acres (41 ha). The name is pronounced with two syllables for "Fork-ed". It fronts on Ohio State Route 124. The park borders the Shade River State Forest, from which it was created in 1951. The dam was created in 1952 when the park was opened to the public.

Park features include a campground, rustic cabins, picnic facilities, hiking trails, a swimming beach, boat ramps, and a disc golf course. It is also located close to an Ohio River boat ramp, so the campground serves Ohio River boaters.
