= List of Ohio state forests =

The Ohio Department of Natural Resources Division of Forestry manages 23 state forests.

== Ohio state forests ==
Name	Location (of main entrance)	How many acres (km^{2})
Beaver Creek State Forest		1,122 acres
Blue Rock State Forest	Muskingum County	4,578 acres
Brush Creek State Forest	Rarden	13,515 acres
Dean State Forest	Lawrence County	2,745 acres (10 km^{2})
Fernwood State Forest	Jefferson County	3,023 acres
Gifford State Forest	Athens County	320 acres (1.3 km^{2})
Harrison State Forest	Harrison County	1,345 acres (5 km^{2})
Hocking State Forest	Laurelville	9,817 acres
Maumee State Forest	Swanton	3,299 acres
Mohican-Memorial State Forest	Ashland County	4,541 acres
Perry State Forest	New Lexington	4,706 acres
Pike State Forest	Pike/Highland counties	12,159 acres
Richland Furnace State Forest	Byer	2,524 acres (9 km^{2})
Scioto Trail State Forest	Chillicothe	9,600 acres (38 km^{2})
Shade River State Forest	Meigs County	2,859 acres
Shawnee State Forest	West Portsmouth	64,978 acres
Sunfish Creek State Forest	Monroe County	637 acres (2.6 km^{2})
Tar Hollow State Forest	Chillicothe	16,436 acres
Vinton Furnace State Experimental Forest	Vinton County	12,086 acres
West Blue Rock State Forest	Muskingum County	698 acres
Yellow Creek State Forest	Columbiana County	756 acres (3.1 km^{2})
Zaleski State Forest	Zaleski	27,851 acres

== See also ==
- List of national forests of the United States
- Protected areas of Ohio
- Southern Great Lakes forests
