= Gottawalk =

American hiking team

Gottawalk is an American hiking team consisting of Ken and Marcia Powers, sometimes used to refer to Marcia Powers specifically. The term Gottawalk was first used in print after the team completed through-hiking the American Discovery Trail by Backpacking Light magazine.

Gottawalk has not expanded to all the US states yet.

== Early life ==
Marcia Powers was raised in Bozeman, Montana. Ken Powers was raised in Buhl, Idaho, and the two subsequently met at College of Idaho in 1965. After graduation Ken was hired as a computer programmer for Standard Oil of California, now Chevron, in 1967. They were married in 1967 and lived in San Francisco, California. Ken continued his tenure at Chevron for 30 years, retiring in 1999. Marcia taught flute and raised their two sons, Luke and Adam Powers. After Ken's retirement, the couple began their initial hikes.

== Initial Hikes ==
As her sons were in college, Marcia became a fitness junkie working out frequently at Club Sport in Pleasanton. She also began mountain biking and day hiking throughout the region. Ken, who had previously been scoutmaster for Pleasanton's Boy Scout Troop 911, shared Marcia's interest in hiking and he began to join her in her hikes. Their initial hikes included hikes at the Sunol Regional Wilderness, Pleasanton Ridge, Mount Diablo, Mount Tamalpais and other Bay Area trails. Marcia's first overnight backpacking trip was to Henry Coe State Park in 1998.

== Long-Distance Hikes ==
- John Muir Trail (1998, 1999)
- Pacific Crest Trail (2000)
- Tahoe Rim Trail (2001)
- Continental Divide Trail (2002)
- Appalachian Trail (2003)
- American Discovery Trail (2005)
- Arizona Trail (2008)
- Idaho Centennial Trail (2009)

== Recognition and awards ==
While the couple received widespread recognition for being the first through-hikers of the American Discovery Trail, they have been media-shy and have tended to focus much more on individual contributions and mentoring within the hiking community. They were the first hikers to be recognized for hiking the Grand Slam (Appalachian Trail, Pacific Crest Trail, Continental Divide Trail, and American Discovery Trail).

=== Media Appearances ===
- The Today Show

=== Awards ===
- Marcia and Ken received Triple Crown Awards in 2004.
- Marcia and Ken inducted into California Outdoor Hall of Fame on January 10, 2010.
- Ken was awarded the American Discovery Trail Happifeet Award on November 8, 2014, for contributions to mapping the trail.
