= American Perimeter Trail =

Long-distance hiking trail in the United States

- Length: 14,000 mi (23,000 km)
- Location: Continental United States
- Difficulty: High
- Website: americanperimetertrail.org

The American Perimeter Trail (APT) is a proposed 14,000-mile (23,000 km) hiking trail system that circumnavigates the contiguous United States.

The proposed trail system integrates existing trails such as the Pacific Crest Trail, Appalachian Trail, and portions of the North Country Trail.

== History ==
In July 2019, American professional backpacker Rue McKenrick set off from Bend, Oregon to hike the proposed American Perimeter Trail. He successfully completed hiking the trail on October 8, 2022.

An interactive map of the trail was released on May 9, 2023.

In 2024, McKenrick published American Perimeter Trail: Volume 1 West: A 14,000 Mile Journey, a book detailing his experiences on the Trail.

== Planning ==
The American Perimeter Trail Conference (APTC) is responsible for planning the proposed the trail. As of 2023, McKenrick serves as the executive director.

== States ==
Clockwise starting from Oregon, the trail passes through 34 of the 48 continental states.

Most of the proposed sections of the trail are in the southern United States. The northern sections of the trail use various existing trails.

== See also ==
- American Discovery Trail
