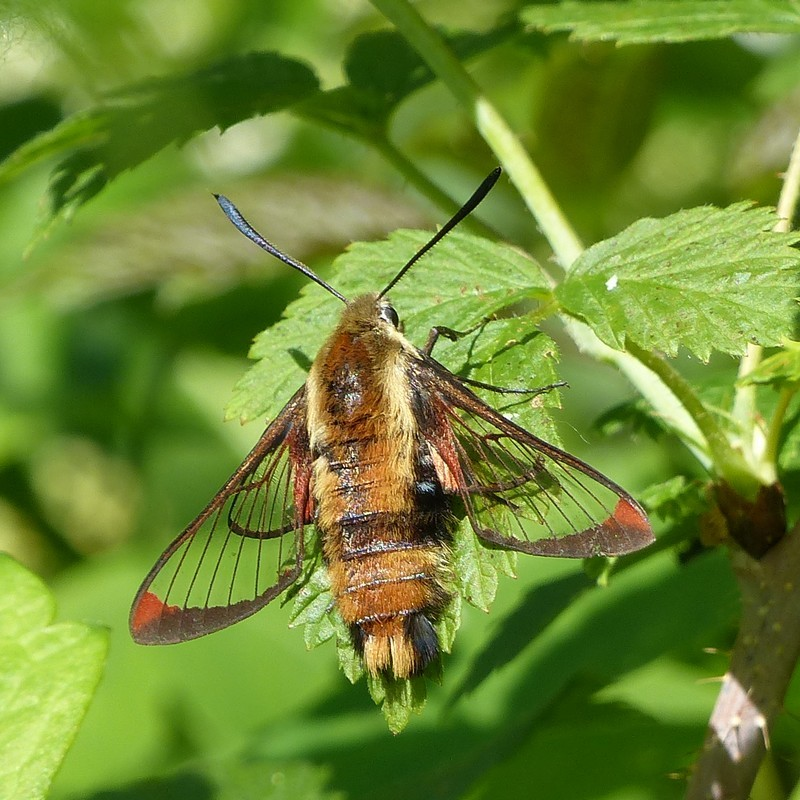
- Adult resting on a leaf

Conservation status
- Apparently Secure (NatureServe)

Scientific classification
- Kingdom: Animalia
- Phylum: Arthropoda
- Class: Insecta
- Order: Lepidoptera
- Family: Sphingidae
- Genus: Hemaris
- Species: H. aethra

Binomial name
- Hemaris aethra (Strecker, 1875)

Synonyms
- Macroglossa aethra Strecker, 1875; Haemorrhagia diffinis aethra (Barnes & McDunnough, 1910)

= Hemaris aethra =

Species of moth

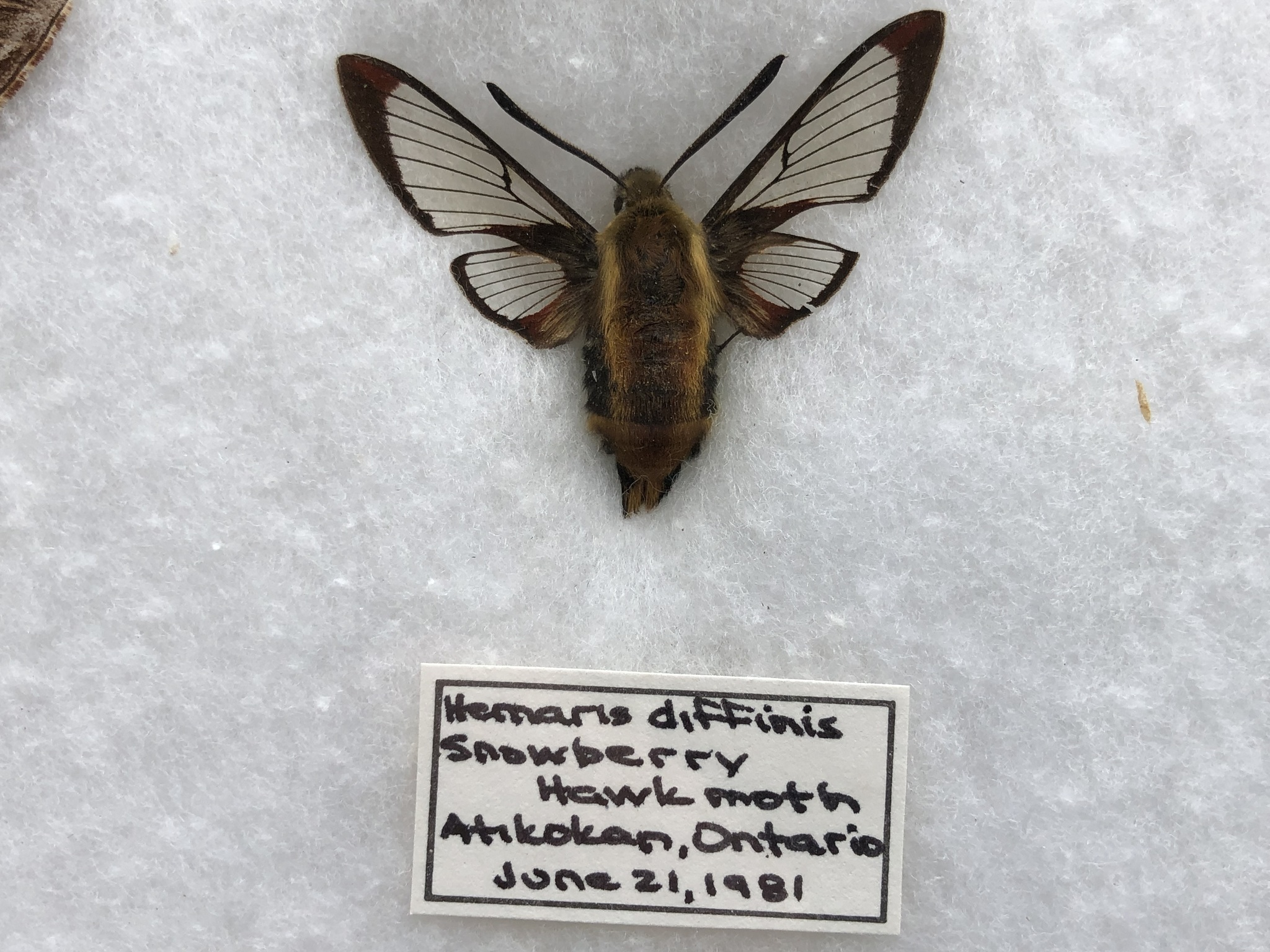
A Hemaris aethra specimen from the 1980s labelled as Hemaris diffinis

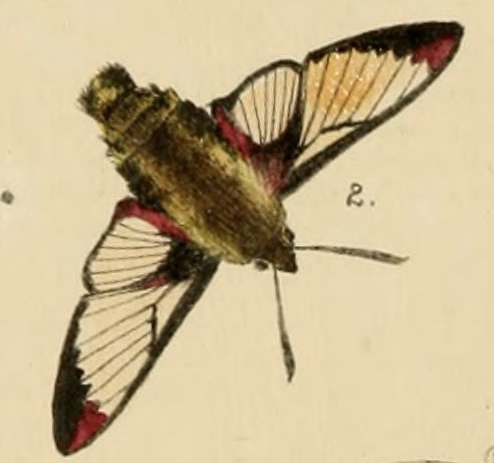
Herman Strecker's illustration (pl. xiii, fig. 2), c. 1876

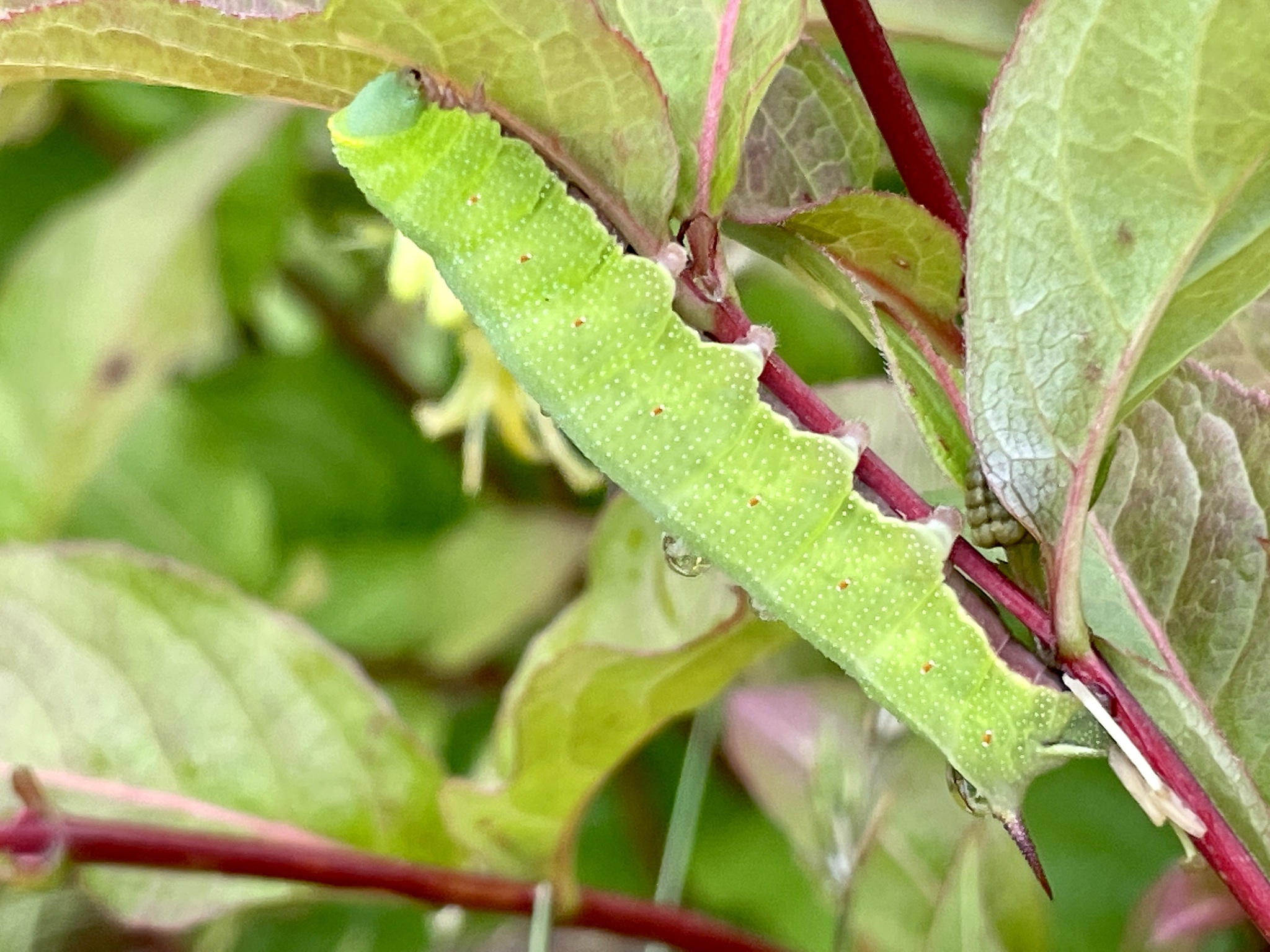
Caterpillar (green morph)

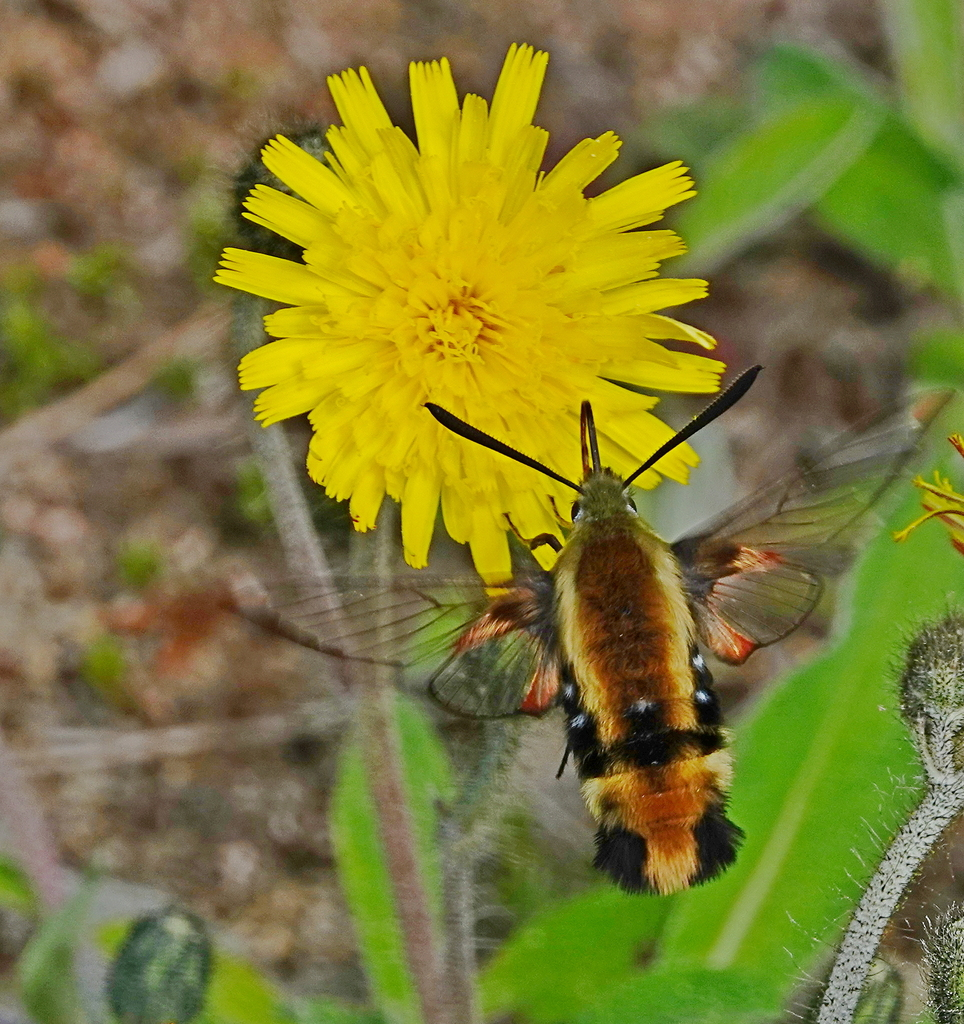
Adult nectaring on a hawkweed

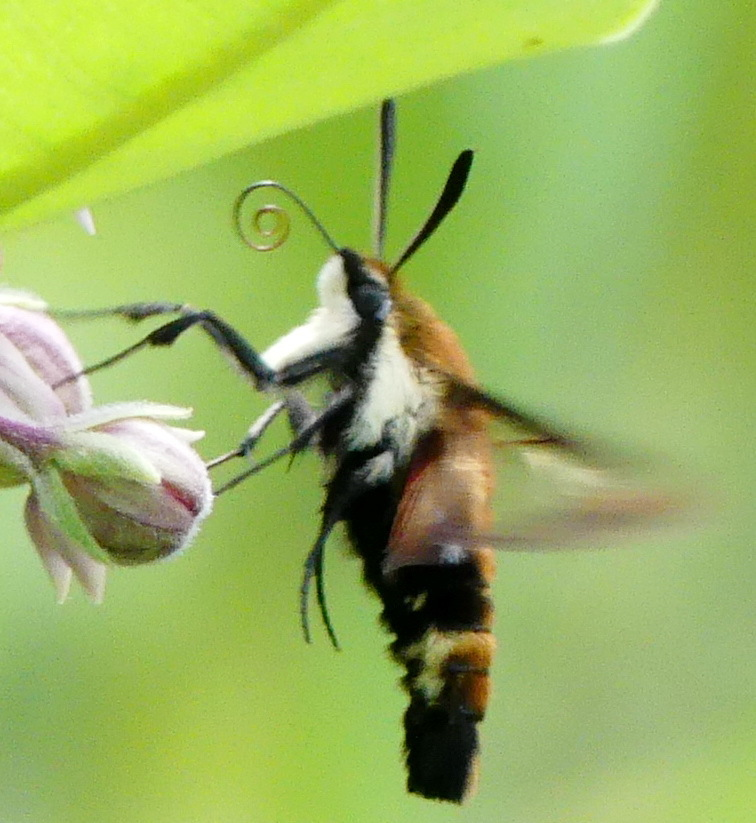
Adult at a flower

Hemaris aethra, the Diervilla clearwing, is a moth in the family Sphingidae (subfamily Macroglossinae). It is native to the northern United States and southern Canada. Like H. diffinis, with which it shares some of its range, H. aethra is a bumblebee mimic.

After having long been treated as a subspecies of H. diffinis due to difficulty in distinguishing them morphologically, H. aethra was elevated to species status in 2018.

== Etymology ==
The specific name, aethra, comes from Ancient Greek Αἴθρα (romanized: Aíthra), meaning "bright sky". (Note: Graves prefaces the index by saying, "Many of the meanings are doubtful" (p. 377).) Several women in Greek myth bear this name; the exact namesake Strecker had in mind is not clear.

== Taxonomy ==
=== Taxonomic history ===
Strecker (1875) described the moth as Macroglossa aethra based on a female specimen from Montreal, identifying it as either a novel species or a "most remarkable aberrant form of Diffinis [sic]". Within eastern diffinis, Barnes & McDunnough (1910) recognized H. diffinis aethra as a northern subspecies occurring from Maine to northern Ontario.

=== Relationship to H. diffinis ===
Schmidt (2009) barcoded the mitochondrial DNA of nominal H. diffinis specimens from eastern Ontario and found them to be two sympatric groups with diverging genes for cytochrome c oxidase. Schmidt (2018) examined other characteristics of the two groups and determined H. d. aethra to be a new species, H. aethra, while the nominate subspecies, H. d. diffinis, was synonymized with H. diffinis. H. aethra and H. diffinis do not appear sister taxa, with the former likely being most closely related to H. thetis, the Rocky Mountain clearwing. The phenotypical similarity of H. aethra and H. diffinis can be attributed to convergent evolution through co-mimicry of the same bumblebee model.

== Distribution and habitat ==
Hemaris aethra ranges from Maine to northern Ontario, with occasional records as far west as Saskatchewan. Its geographic range is moderately broad (200,000-2,500,000 square km or 80,000-1,000,000 square miles) but is limited by that of Diervilla lonicera, its host plant. H. aethra is found in mesic, open deciduous forest, mostly in igneous bedrock plant communities, conditions that likely reflect the requirements of its host. In contrast, H. diffinis is found in more xeric, savannah-like habitats where its host Symphoricarpos is common.

The separation distance for both unsuitable and suitable habitat is 1 kilometer.

In addition to being sympatric with H. diffinis in eastern Ontario and possibly other areas, aethra's range overlaps with those of H. gracilis and H. thysbe.

== Description ==
The H. aethra larva has multiple color forms, green being most common. It has bright red spiracles, a yellow prothoracic collar, and a caudal horn with a black apex fading to a pink-purple base; in contrast, diffinis larvae have black spiracles and the base of the caudal horn is bright yellow.

Adults can be extremely difficult to tell apart from H. diffinis where they occur in sympatry, such as in eastern Ontario. Generally, aethra adults are slightly larger and more robust, and the dorsal thorax is a richer orange-brown color contrasting strongly with olive-brown dorsolateral stripes. The head is often greenish grey. The reddish-brown scaling on the apex of the forewings is generally larger and brighter red in aethra than diffinis, taking up 50% or more of the R4-R5 cell, and that on the hindwing anal margins is also more extensive.

== Ecology ==
Like other Hemaris species, Hemaris aethra is a dayflying moth. It hovers at flowers to feed on their nectar, pollinating them in the process. Adults have been recorded nectaring on Vaccinium, Chicory, and Lonicera tatarica.

The only known host plant for H. aethra larvae is the northern bush honeysuckle (Diervilla lonicera). Native Lonicera species may also be larval hosts like they are for H. diffinis, but Lonicera are typically much less common than Diervilla where H. aethra occurs.

== Conservation ==
Threats and potential conservation needs are unknown, as are long-term and short-term population trends. As of 2024, the species is not listed as endangered under the U.S. Endangered Species Act or Canada's Species at Risk Act.

== See also ==
- Species complex — aethra was a cryptic species in the H. diffinis complex
- Plant hosts of micropredators — larval host plants and host specificity
- Generalist and specialist species — specificity/specialization in Lepidoptera in broader context of generalists and specialists
