= Cooperrider-Kent Bog State Nature Preserve =

State Nature Preserve in Portage County, Ohio

- Kent Bog
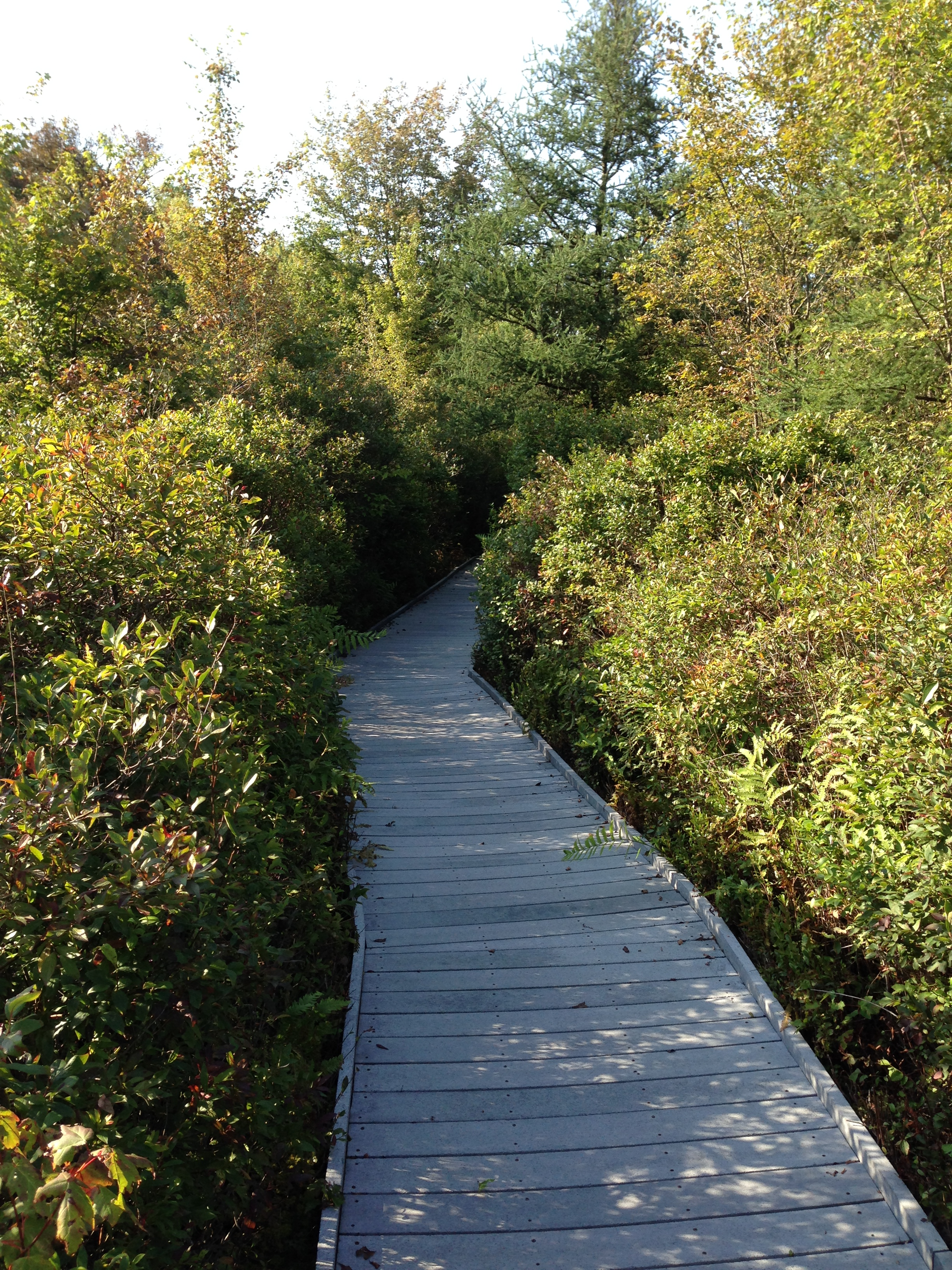

- Location within Ohio Location within the United States
- Location: Kent, Ohio
- Coordinates: 41.129444°N 81.353611°W
- Area: 45 acres (18 ha)
- Website: Official website

The Cooperrider-Kent Bog State Nature Preserve is state nature preserve located mainly in Kent, Ohio. The preserve surrounds the Kent Bog, a remnant of the Wisconsin Glaciation. It is a true bog with acidic waters, and unique environmental conditions have enabled it to survive. The bog contains the largest stand of tamarack trees in the state of Ohio.

== Location ==
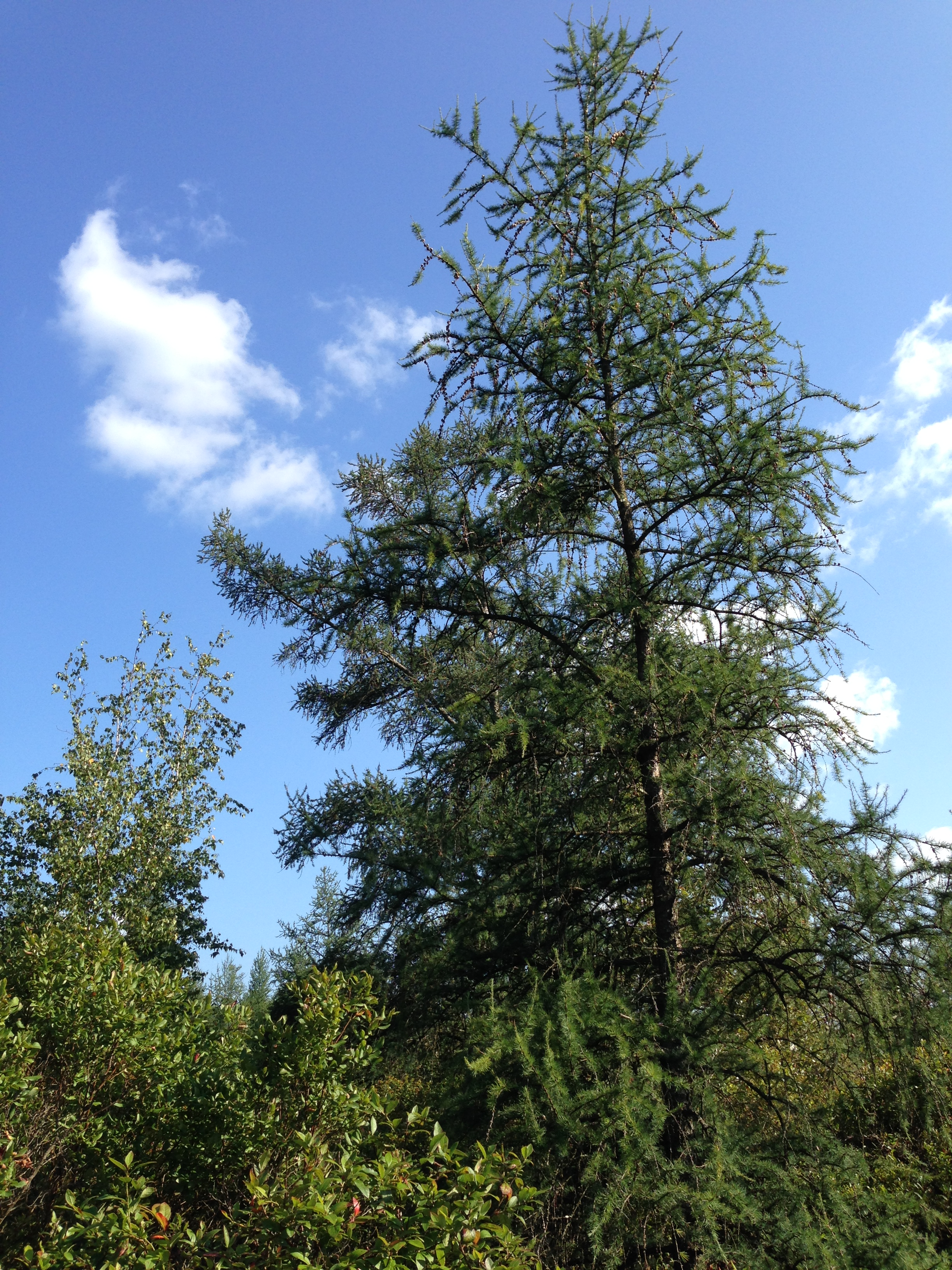
Tamarack tree in the Kent Bog

The Kent Bog is located at 1028 Meloy Road and covers an area of 45.1 acres (18.3 ha). The original 41.7 acres (16.9 ha) of the preserve, acquired by the Ohio Department of Natural Resources (ODNR) in 1985, is located in Kent. In October 2008, ODNR acquired an additional 3.4 acres (1.4 ha) in neighboring Brimfield Township. Adjacent to the south of the preserve is a 215-acre (87 ha) park being developed by the Portage Park District on land it acquired in 2017. There is parking at the beginning of the half-mile boardwalk. The boardwalk trail loops around the bog, ending back at the parking lot. Along the trail there are educational signs explaining the local flora, and fauna as well as the geological founding of the bog.

The preserve was dedicated in 1987 and is named after Tom Smith Cooperrider, a botanist, author, and emeritus professor of biological sciences at Kent State University who has made numerous contributions to the study of the bog and the state's flora. His 2010 book, Botanical Essays from Kent, discusses natural history of the area and focuses mainly on the Kent Bog.

== Geology and geography ==
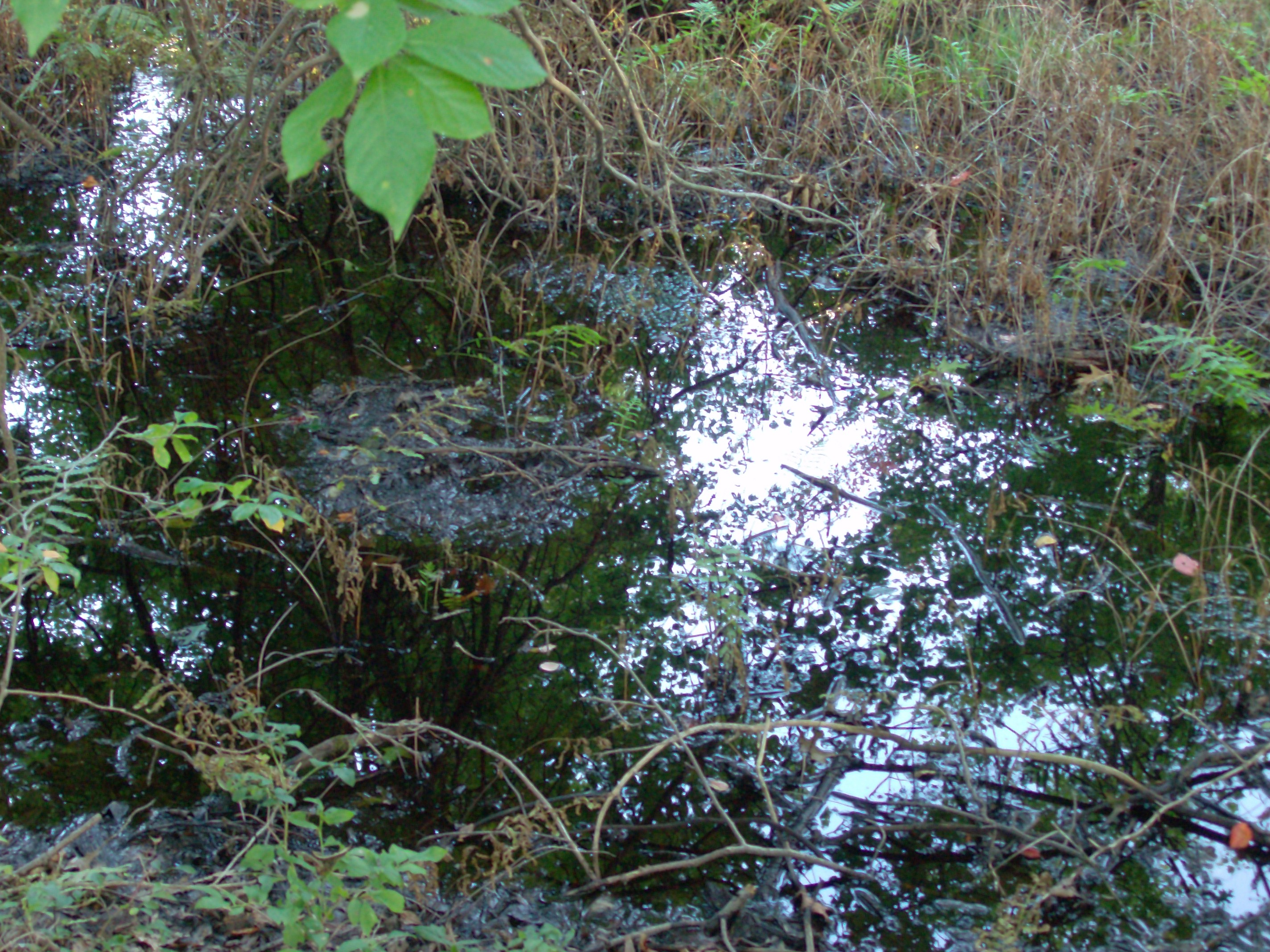
Visible water in the Kent Bog

The bog was formed during the retreat of the Wisconsin Glacier. A chunk of glacial ice broke off and was buried in sediment and glacial till from the glacial outwash. A ridge of sediment formed around the chunk of ice. This caused the formation of a deep kettle hole lake. The total original size of the kettle-hole lake was about 50 acres (20 ha).

As the climate continued to warm, plant life spread over the lake. Although it is not exclusive, it is heavily dominated in sphagnum moss. This began the process by which the lake began to fill with peat becoming a bog. There are only a few areas that standing water is visible from the boardwalk.

== Flora and fauna ==
It is a coniferous, boreal forest with many spruce, fir, and tamarack trees. The tamarack is a tree common to the upper parts of Canada and Alaska. It is able to withstand very cold temperatures. Unlike other conifers, it is deciduous losing its needles in the winter. This transforms the look of the Kent Bog during the seasons. The stand of tamaracks in the Kent Bog is the largest group in the state of Ohio.
