= Yellow Creek State Forest =

Protected forest in Ohio, United States

Coordinates: 40°39′27″N 80°47′48″W

- IUCN category V (protected landscape/seascape)
- Location: Columbiana County, Ohio, US
- Nearest city: Salineville, Ohio
- Area: 756 acres (306 ha)
- Governing body: Ohio Department of Natural Resources

Yellow Creek State Forest is a state forest in Columbiana County, Ohio, United States.
