= Acadia Cliffs State Nature Preserve =

Nature preserve in Ohio, United States

- Location within Ohio Location within the United States
- Location: Washington County, Ohio, USA
- Coordinates: 39.321°N 81.845°W
- Area: 112 acres (0.5 km^{2})
- Established: 1994
- Governing body: Ohio Department of Natural Resources

Acadia Cliffs State Nature Preserve is a state nature preserve in Washington County, Ohio, United States, with a small neck extending into Athens County, Ohio. Covering an area of 112 acres (0.45 km^{2}), it was founded in 1994. It is known for its sandstone cliffs. For a time, it was administered by the Ohio State Division of Wildlife, but is now administered by the Ohio Division of Nature Preserves. The nature preserve is close to the Washington-Athens County border.

The preserve centers on Beebe Road, which may be reached from Ohio State Route 144 east of Stewart, Ohio. The name derives from the fact that the land was formerly owned by the Acadia Coal Company. The property includes an old millstone quarry, and many old millstones can still be seen on the site, now back in the forest.

This nature preserve was established in part to protect the Bradley's spleenwort, Asplenium bradleyi. The spleenwort is a state-listed plant species.
