= Sunfish Creek State Forest =

Protected forest in Ohio, United States

Coordinates: 39°49′N 80°50′W

- IUCN category V (protected landscape/seascape)
- Location: Monroe County, Ohio
- Nearest city: Switzerland Township, OH
- Area: 637 acres (258 ha)
- Established: 1963
- Governing body: Ohio Department of Natural Resources

Sunfish Creek State Forest is a state forest in Monroe County, Ohio, United States.
