= Vinton Furnace State Experimental Forest =

Ohio state forest

Coordinates: 39°11′45″N 82°23′07″W

- Vinton Furnace State Forest
- IUCN category V (protected landscape/seascape)
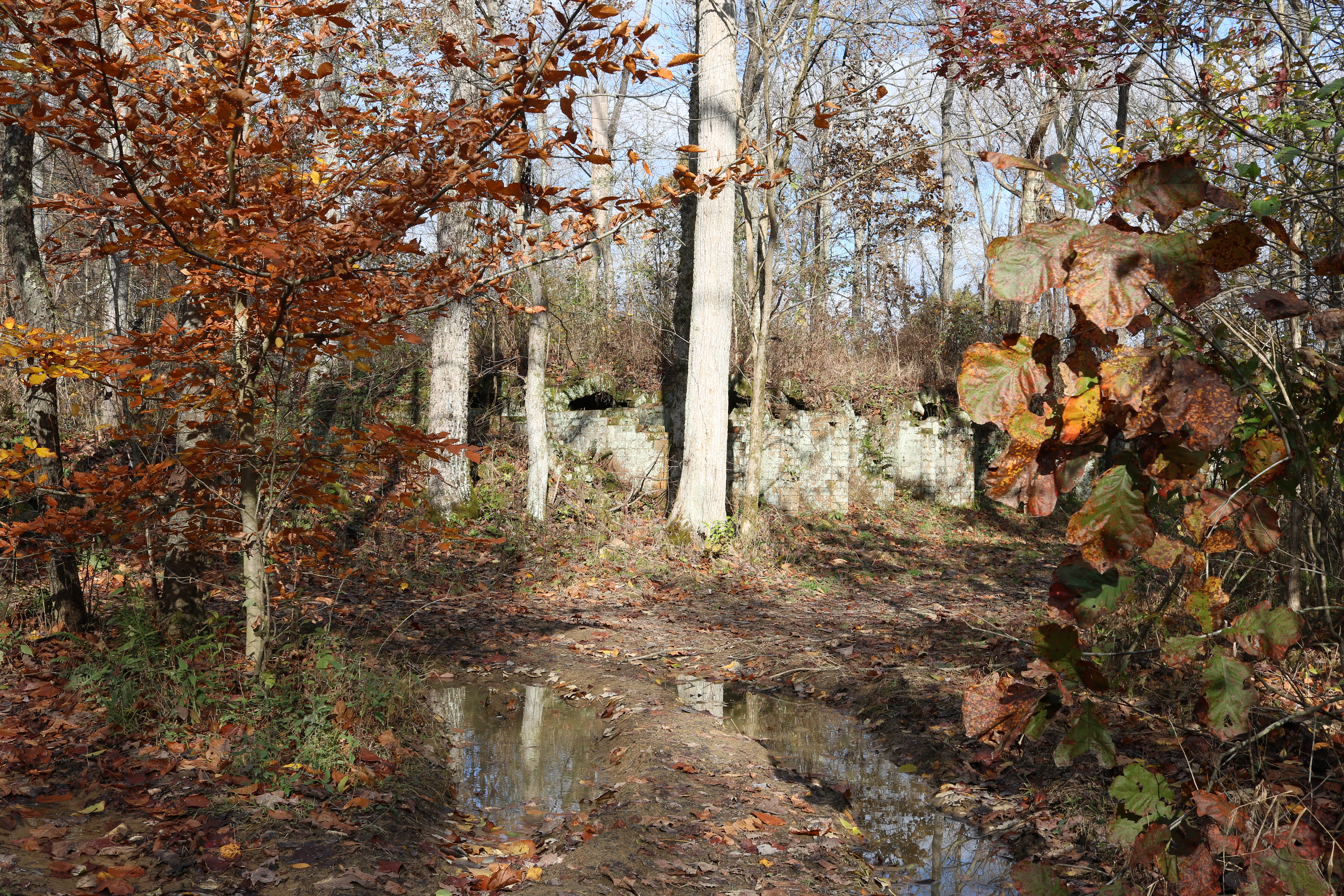
- Ruins in Vinton Furnace State Experimental Forest
- Location: Vinton County, Ohio
- Nearest city: Hamden, OH
- Area: 15,849 acres (64.14 km^{2})
- Governing body: Ohio Department of Natural Resources

The Vinton Furnace State Experimental Forest and Raccoon Ecological Management Area (REMA) is a state forest in Vinton County, Ohio, United States. It comprises 15,849 acres, the largest remaining intact block of forest in Ohio still available for permanent protection. Since 2000, data collected at the forest has been cited in nearly 200 academic articles.
