= Culberson Woods State Nature Preserve =

State Nature Preserve in Clinton County, Ohio

Coordinates: 39°22′12″N 83°56′0″W

- Culberson Woods Dedicated Nature Preserve
- IUCN category V (protected landscape/seascape)
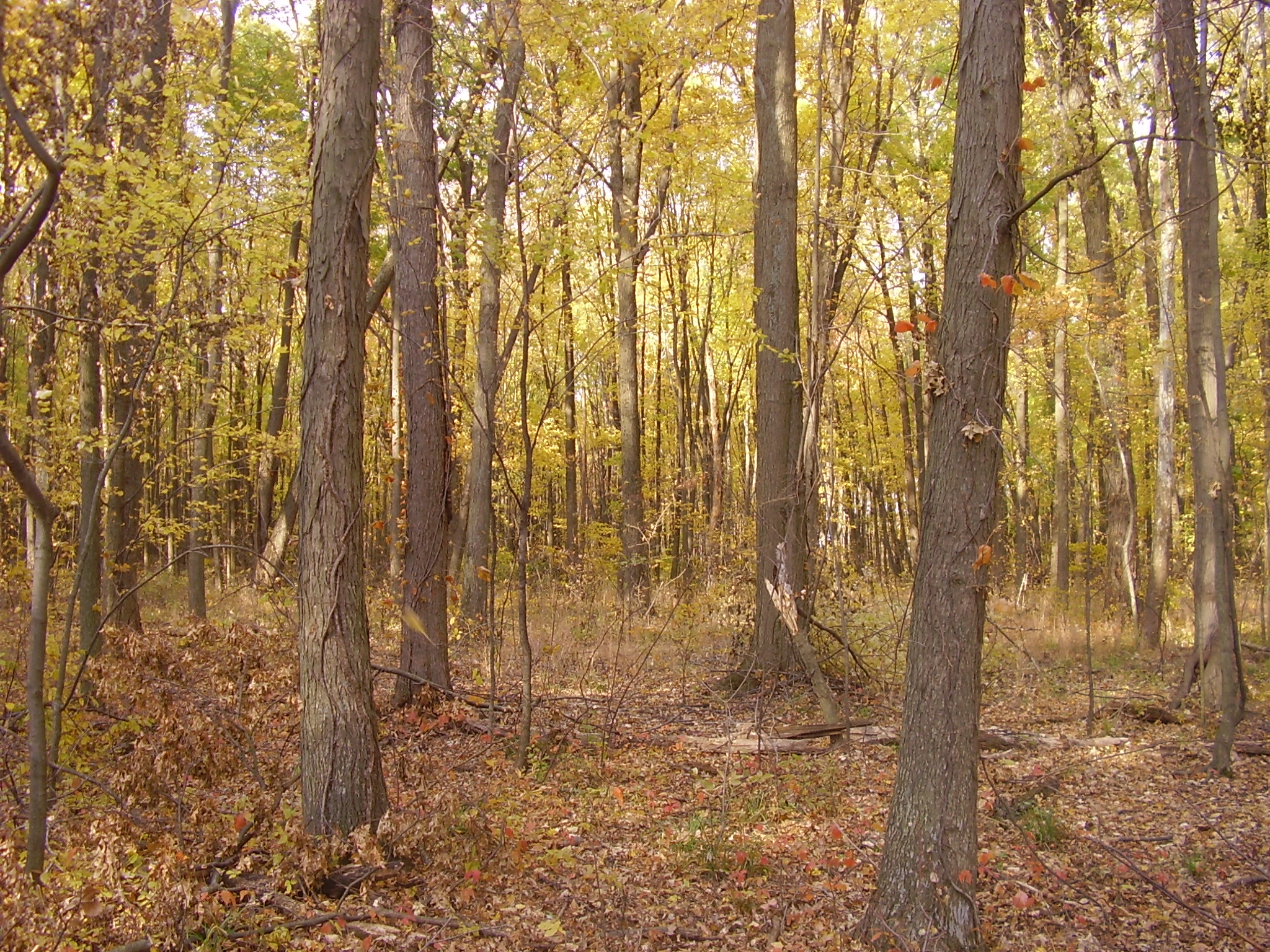
- Hickories and Pin Oaks during the dry season

- Location within Ohio Location within the United States
- Location: Clinton County, Ohio
- Nearest city: Wilmington, Ohio
- Area: 241 acres (98 ha)
- Governing body: Ohio Department of Natural Resources

Culberson Woods State Nature Preserve is located in Clinton County, Ohio, United States. It protects one of the largest remnants of the white swamp forest which once covered the uplands of the Till Plans of Ohio and Indiana. This type of swamp has poorly drained, white clay soil and is wet in the winter but dry in the summer.

The most common trees in the swamp are red maple, Pin Oak, Shagbark Hickory, Shellbark Hickory, Swamp White Oak, American elm and sweetgum. Culberson woods also contains tree species unusual for the Till Plains, such as Pumpkin Ash and Winterberry. Summer flowers include purple fringeless orchid and cardinal flower.

Culberson woods is open to the public, but it encompasses 40 acres (160,000 m^{2}) with a 3-mile trail.
