= Rockbridge State Nature Preserve =

Protected area in Ohio, United States

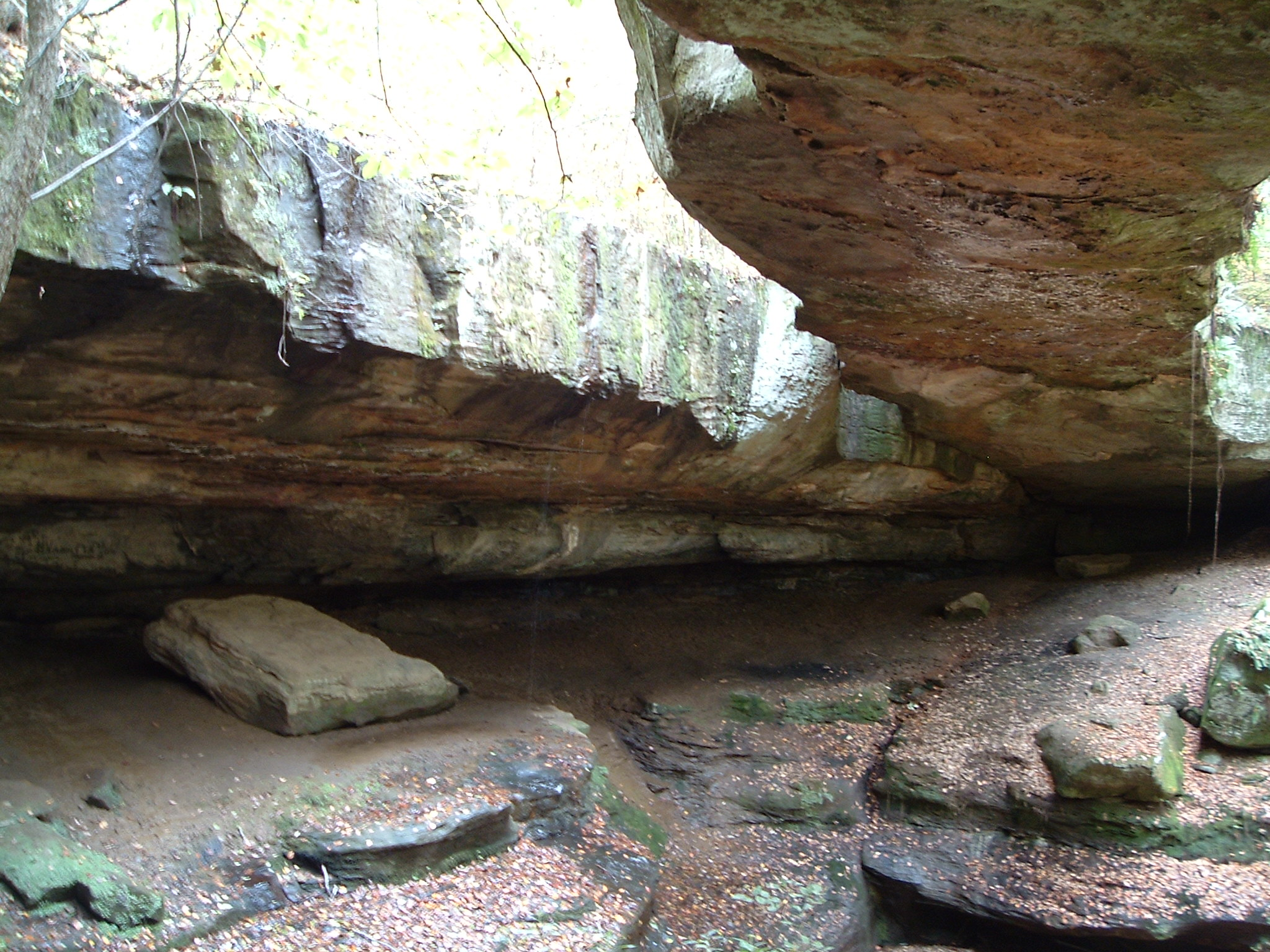
- The natural bridge at Rockbridge State Nature Preserve

- Location within Ohio Location within the United States
- Location: Rockbridge, Hocking County, Ohio, United States
- Coordinates: 39°33.982′N 82°29.965′W
- Area: 182 acres (74 ha)
- Established: 1978
- Governing body: Ohio Department of Natural Resources

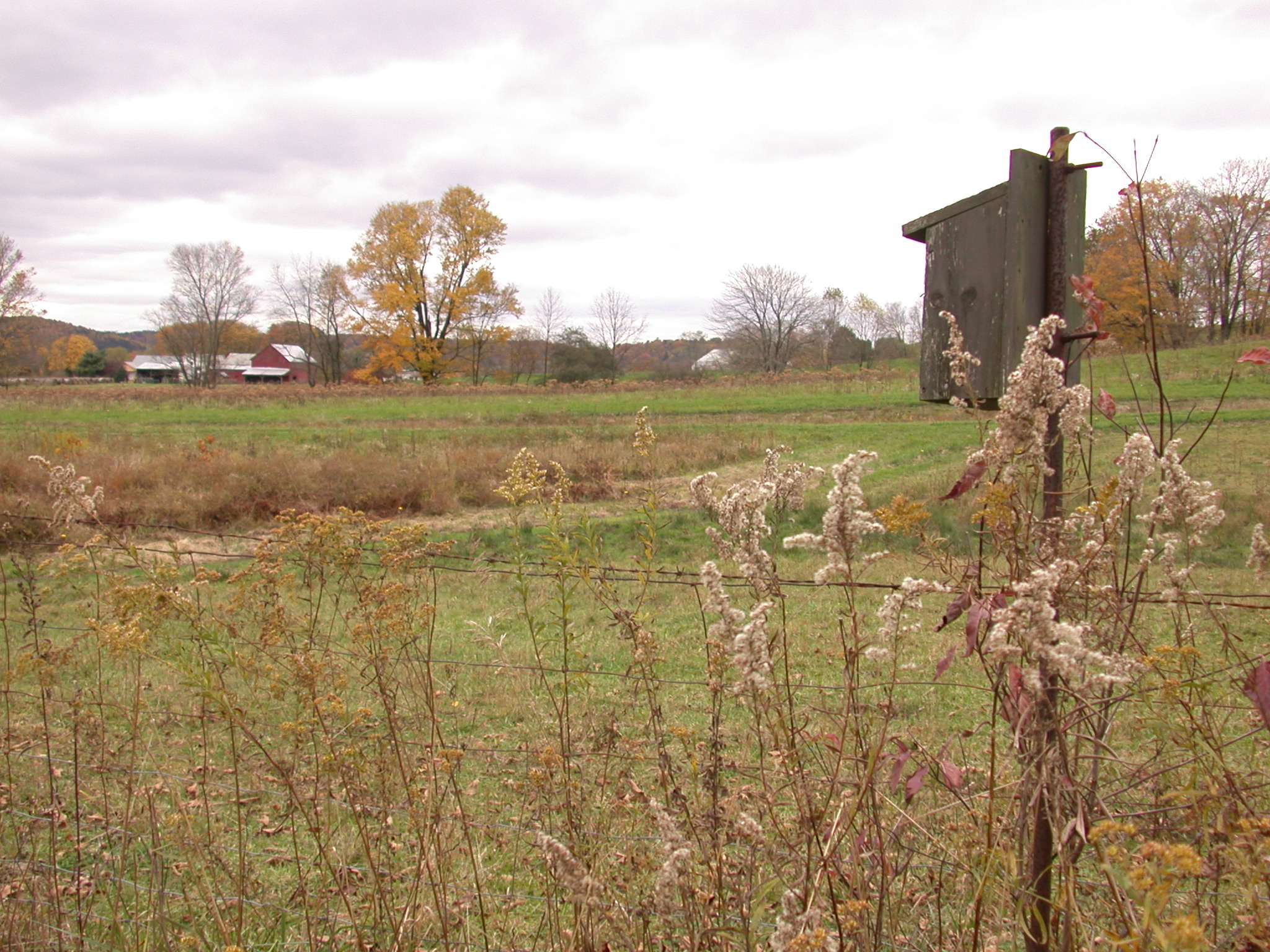
Farm fields near trail

Rockbridge State Nature Preserve is a nature reserve featuring a natural bridge located in the unincorporated community of Rockbridge in Hocking County, Ohio, United States. It is part of the Hocking Hills region, but the sandstone that forms the natural bridge is located lower in the stratigraphic sequence than that which forms most of the region's notable features.

== Nature preserve ==
The preserve consists of 182 acres (0.74 km^{2}) of land which borders the Hocking River and is connected to the trailhead via a narrow easement. The park's 2.75-mile (4.43 km) trail system includes two loop trails, one of which passes the natural bridge, while the other passes a rock shelter. Both formations are located a short distance from the Hocking River on small tributaries. The preserve was acquired by the state of Ohio in 1978.

== Natural bridge ==
The natural bridge is the largest of at least 12 natural bridges in the state of Ohio. It is approximately 100 feet (30 m) long, 10 to 20 feet (3.0 to 6.1 m) wide, and 3 feet (0.91 m) thick. It was formed when water eroded the softer layers of Mississippian Black Hand sandstone underneath the bridge. The nearby community of Rockbridge, Ohio is named after the formation.
