= Tar Hollow State Park =

State park in Ohio, United States

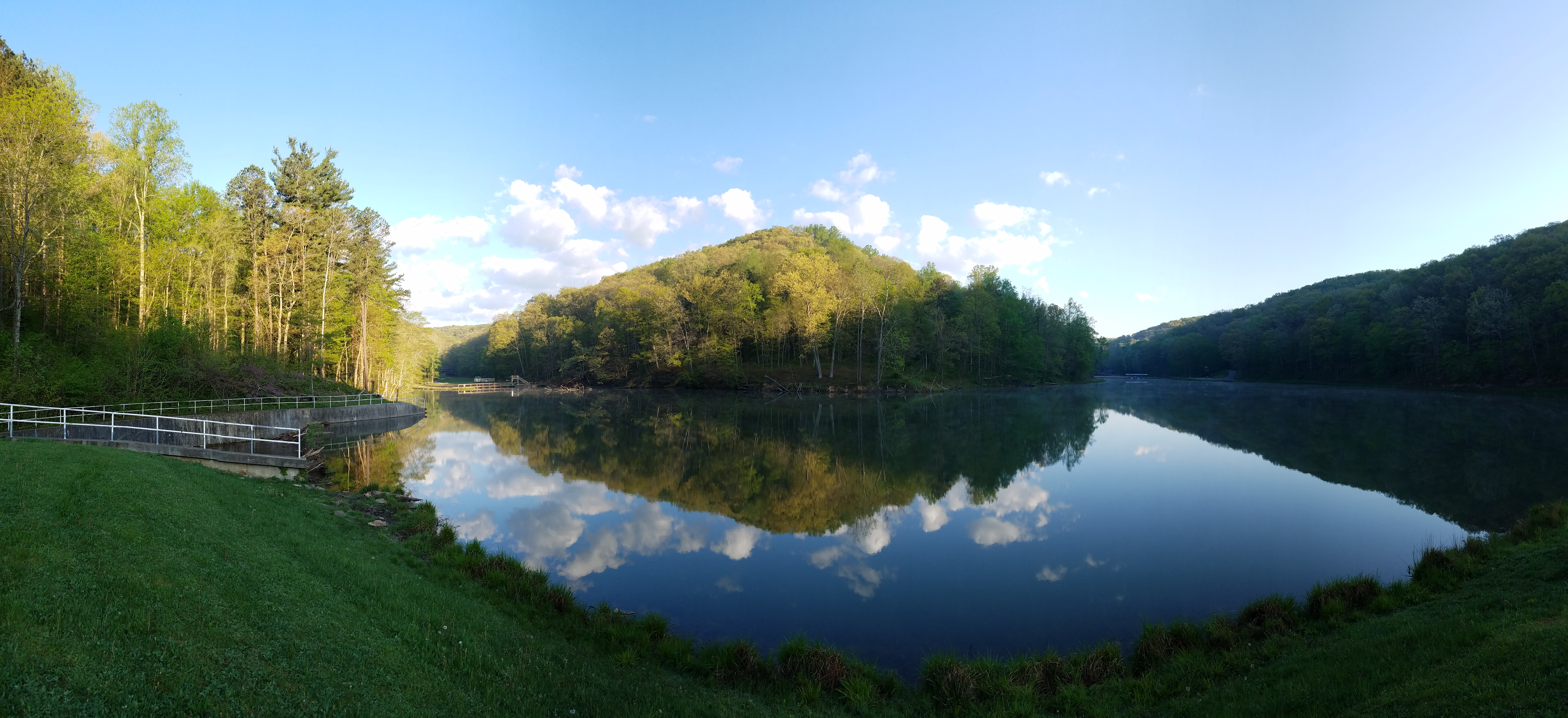
- Tar Hollow State Park, May 2018

- Location within Ohio Location within the United States
- Location: Hocking County, Ohio, United States
- Nearest town: Laurelville
- Coordinates: 39°23′06″N 82°44′56″W
- Area: Land: 604 acres (244 ha); Water: 15 acres (6.1 ha)
- Elevation: 791 feet (241 m)
- Established: 1949
- Administrator: Ohio Department of Natural Resources
- Designation: Ohio state park
- Website: Tar Hollow State Park

Tar Hollow State Park is a public recreation area located five miles south of Laurelville, Ohio, in the United States. Surrounded by the foothills of the Appalachian Plateau, the state park is part of a larger protected complex with the adjoining Tar Hollow State Forest. The park offers hiking trails that extend into the state forest in addition to boating, fishing and swimming on 15-acre (6.1 ha) Pine Lake.

== History ==
Tar Hollow earned its moniker as a source of pine tar for pioneers. The region was among non-productive agricultural acreage purchased by the federal government in the 1930s. Recreational facilities were developed under various New Deal programs. The Ohio Division of Forestry took over management of the site, then known as Tar Hollow Forest-Park, in 1939. The state park was created with the advent of the Ohio Department of Natural Resources Division of Parks and Recreation in 1949. The park was carved out of Tar Hollow State Forest, third largest state forest in Ohio.
