= Gifford State Forest (Ohio) =

Protected forest in Ohio, United States

Coordinates: 39°26′48″N 81°54′34″W

- IUCN category V (protected landscape/seascape)
- Location: Athens County, Ohio
- Nearest city: Bern Township, OH
- Area: 320 acres (130 ha)
- Established: 1959
- Governing body: Ohio Department of Natural Resources

Gifford State Forest is the smallest state forest in the U.S. state of Ohio. It includes some hiking trails, forested hills and bluffs, and a small breeding nursery. It is located in Bern Township, Athens County. This forest was donated by William Gifford Selby in 1959 and is named after his mother Virginia Gifford.

== History ==
Gifford State Forest was established in 1959 when the 320-acre tract was donated to the state by William Gifford Selby under the condition that the land be used for experimentation and research. The forest is named after his mother's family, the Giffords. Occupying the hill country on the northern edge of Athens County, Ohio, the site is the smallest of Ohio's state forests.

== Features and Recreation ==
At only 320 acres, Gifford State Forest remains compact but offers a variety of outdoor opportunities. A network of hiking trails, including the “Vista Trail” (~1.5 miles) and the “Indian Stone Trail” (~2.3 miles), loop through forested ridges, large boulders, and steep slopes. Visitors may explore scenic ridgelines and woodland terrain primarily via foot travel. The forest permits seasonal hunting for game such as deer and rabbit, in keeping with the rules of the managing agency.

== Ecology and Management ==
Gifford State Forest is managed by the Ohio Department of Natural Resources (ODNR) Division of Forestry as both a productive woodland and experimental seed-orchard site. The site features plantations of white pine and other species, and prescribed burns have been used to manage pests such as the white pine cone beetle. The forest's rolling terrain sits within the unglaciated Appalachian Plateau of southeastern Ohio, with elevations averaging around 850 feet (260 m) above sea level. Despite its modest size, the forest contributes to regional wildlife habitat and provides accessible public woodland recreation for Athens County residents.

== See also ==
- List of Ohio state forests
- Wayne National Forest
