= Maumee State Forest =

Protected forest in Ohio, United States

- Location within Ohio
- Location: Fulton Lucas Henry, Ohio, United States
- Coordinates: 41°31′14″N 83°54′07″W
- Area: 3,452 acres (13.97 km^{2})
- Named for: Maumee River
- Governing body: Ohio Department of Natural Resources Division of Forestry
- Website: Ohio Department of Natural Resources - Maumee State Forest

Maumee State Forest is a state forest in Fulton, Henry, and Lucas counties in the U.S. state of Ohio. It is located about 3 miles west of Whitehouse and about 4 miles south of Swanton. It is managed by the Ohio Department of Natural Resources Division of Forestry.

The forest consists of 3,452 acres (1,397 ha) of largely flat land that had formerly been cleared for farming. Initial acquisition of land began in 1946, and the forest reached its current size in 2023. Maumee State Forest boasts some 66 miles of hiking trails, 8 miles of bridle trails, and is one of only four Ohio State Forests with all-terrain vehicle trails, and the only one in Northwest Ohio. The forest serves as a remnant example of the oak openings habitat that once covered much of Northwest Ohio and Southeast Michigan.
