= Dean State Forest =

Protected forest in Ohio, United States

Coordinates: 38°42′N 82°36′W

- IUCN category V (protected landscape/seascape)
- Location: Lawrence County, Ohio
- Nearest city: Ironton, Ohio
- Area: 2,800 acres (11 km^{2})
- Established: 1916
- Governing body: Ohio Department of Natural Resources

Dean State Forest is a state forest in Lawrence County, Ohio, United States.
