= Richland Furnace State Forest =

Protected forest in Ohio, United States

- IUCN category V (protected landscape/seascape)
- Location within Ohio Location within the United States
- Location: Jackson and Vinton County
- Nearest city: Wellston, Ohio
- Coordinates: 39.175°N 82.6083333°W
- Area: 2,417 acres (9.78 km^{2})
- Governing body: Ohio Department of Natural Resources

Richland Furnace State Forest is a state forest in Jackson and Vinton counties in the U.S. state of Ohio.
