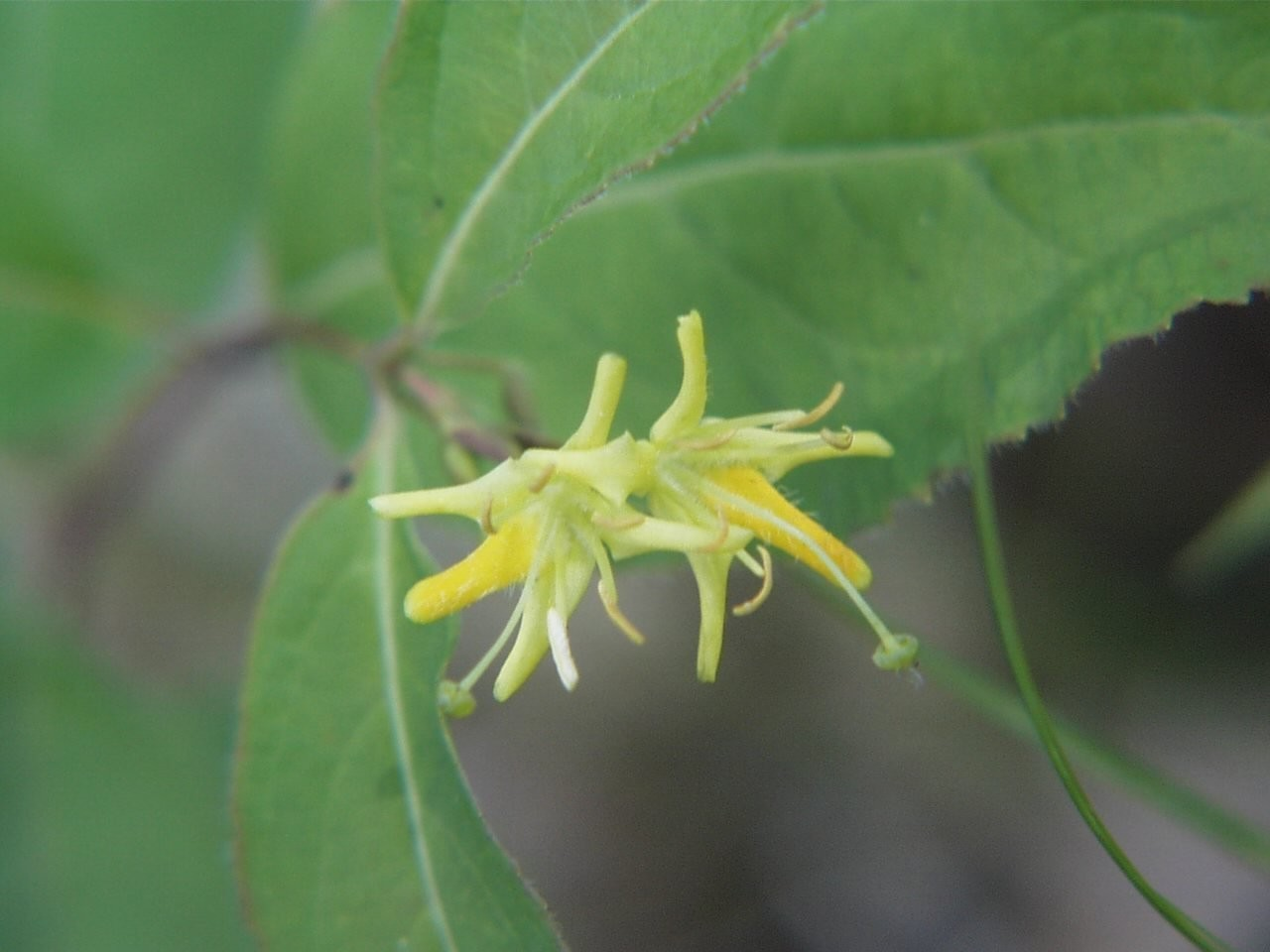

Conservation status
- Secure (NatureServe)

Scientific classification
- Kingdom: Plantae
- Clade: Tracheophytes
- Clade: Angiosperms
- Clade: Eudicots
- Clade: Asterids
- Order: Dipsacales
- Family: Caprifoliaceae
- Genus: Diervilla
- Species: D. lonicera

Binomial name
- Diervilla lonicera Mill.

= Diervilla lonicera =

Species of flowering plant

Diervilla lonicera, commonly referred to as northern bush honeysuckle, low bush honeysuckle, dwarf bush honeysuckle, or yellow-flowered upright honeysuckle, is a deciduous shrub native to the northeastern United States and Canada. Its specific epithet, lonicera (the Latin term for ‘honeysuckle’) refers to its similarity in appearance to the true honeysuckles, genus Lonicera. It attracts bumblebees and is an important source of nectar for them.

== Description ==
Northern bush honeysuckle is a deciduous shrub, reaching a maximum height between 0.6 and 1.2 metres (24 and 47 in). This particular species is known for the following characteristics: branches lying close to the ground, fibrous roots, pale yellow flowers, and dry, woody fruit. Northern bush honeysuckle's simple leaves are placed in an opposite arrangement. As the seasons change, so do the leaves' colours: initially green, the leaf gradually deepens to a dark red. The flowers are in full bloom between early July and early August; the woody seeds are fully matured by September in preparation for dispersal.

Diervilla lonicera has protogynous flowers (initially female-dominant plant), is well-adapted for pollination, and its stigmas remain receptive after anthesis (fully functioning flower).

== Habitat ==
Exposed rocky sites, combined with the plant's tolerance for cool climates, dry, or infertile soils are varying characteristics to describe a typical habitat for Diervilla lonicera. It is commonly found in forests dominated by balsam fir (Abies balsamea) and jack pine (Pinus banksiana). Unlike some plant species that are restricted to specific light conditions, the northern bush honeysuckle is insensitive to changes in light, allowing for broader ranges of habitat. In addition, it is well-adapted to fire-prone habitats, because it can regenerate quickly from underground stems if destroyed by fire. For example, D.J. Schoen found that Diervilla lonicera was the most abundant shrub over a 50-year span on dry ground areas that were destroyed by fire.

== Range ==
Northern bush honeysuckle is found widely spread across most of North America. It grows all along the east coast of the continent, from Northern Quebec and Labrador to Georgia and Alabama and reaches as far west as Saskatchewan. Northern bush honeysuckle was also introduced to parts of Europe sometime in the eighteenth century, but the exact year is unknown.

== Importance to humans ==
Plants from the honeysuckle family are commonly used for herbal cough medicine. The most common use is as an herbal tea for sore throats, but there are also recipes for a cough syrup derived from the leaves and flowers of the vines mixed with honey. It is unknown whether or not Northern bush honeysuckle is any more effective than any other species of bush honeysuckle.

These types of recipes can be found on many online cooking websites, but it is very important to be aware of the dangers involved. Some species of honeysuckle can be poisonous, so it is best to use extreme caution and should not be attempted by anyone who is not an expert in this field.

== Importance to ecosystems ==
The northern bush honeysuckle is a popular food source for a number of animal species. For example, moose consume the shrub and its fruit as a winter food source, whereas white tailed deer consume the plant in both the summer and winter (although preferred in the late summer). The Diervilla lonicera shrub may also be important for sustaining populations of pollinators. This shrub's long and flexible style and readily accessible flowers (produced in large quantities) are known to draw significant numbers of bumble bees. Diervilla lonicera is also the only recorded host plant for the recently described hawkmoth Hemaris aethra.

Bird species also make use of the shrub. Nests are often constructed from its branches for protection from the elements, and the fruits serve as a readily available food source. Diervilla lonicera may even be responsible for triggering population increases and range expansion among various avian species.

== Conservation ==
Northern bush honeysuckle is generally abundant and widespread in North America; it is only considered to be threatened in Tennessee and rare in Indiana. Neither Canada, nor any of the other American states, has bush honeysuckle registered on a threatened or endangered list.
