= Shade River State Forest =

Protected forest in Ohio, United States

- Location within Ohio
- Location: Meigs County, Ohio
- Nearest city: Reedsville, Ohio
- Coordinates: 39°07′N 81°48′W
- Area: 2,475 acres (1,002 ha)
- Governing body: Ohio Department of Natural Resources
- Website: Shade River State Forest

Shade River State Forest is a state forest in Meigs County, Ohio. Forked Run State Park was carved out of it in 1949. Currently, this state forest comprises 2,475 acres (1,002 ha).
