= Mohican-Memorial State Forest =

State forest in Ohio, United States

- IUCN category V (protected landscape/seascape)
- Location within Ohio Location within the United States
- Location: Ashland County
- Nearest city: Loudonville, Ohio
- Coordinates: 40°36′N 82°18′W
- Area: 4,525 acres (18.31 km^{2})
- Established: 1928
- Governing body: Ohio Department of Natural Resources

Mohican-Memorial State Forest is a state forest in Ashland County, Ohio, United States. Mohican-Memorial State Forest is used for forest research, demonstrations of good forest management, tree seed for nurseries, recreation, and protection of soil and watershed.

== Forest description ==
Mohican-Memorial State Forest comprises 4,525 acres (18.31 km^{2}) and is carefully watched over by the Ohio Division of Natural Resources (ODNR). Mohican-Memorial State Forest is at the heart of “Mohican Country”, the third most popular tourist destination in the state. The ODNR Division of Forestry manages the forest under a multiple-use basis. Recreation, forest protection (insect, disease, regeneration and fire), wildlife management, law enforcement, soil and watershed management, and forest management for timber and non-timber are practiced.

The Clear Fork Mohican River and Pine Run are the major streams that run through Mohican-Memorial State Forest. These streams then merge to make the large Mohican River.

Also found within Mohican-Memorial State Forest is the Memorial Forest Shrine Park, covering 270 acres (1.1 km^{2}). In the Memorial Forest Shrine Park there is a chapel-like shrine that has the names of all 20,000 soldiers from Ohio who lost their lives in World War II, the Korean War, the Vietnam War, and the Persian Gulf War.

The forest has many types of trees like oak, hickory, cherry, white and red pine, maple, aspen, sycamore, hemlock, and other types of trees. Many species of animals thrive in Mohican-Memorial State Forest. White-tailed deer and wild turkey have been successfully reintroduced. Ruffed grouse and pheasant are occasionally seen. Fox, coyote, raccoon, striped skunk, rabbit, red and gray squirrel, amphibians, black rat snake, owl, heron, and bald eagle are among the many species reported. The hemlock gorges in the area support a number of rare breeding birds, including blue-headed vireo, magnolia warbler, Blackburnian warbler, Canada warbler, hermit thrush, and winter wren.

== History ==
The Ohio Division of Forestry first acquired the land in 1928 and has continued with the accumulation of over 4,500 acres (18 km^{2}). Some of the land acquired was deforested for agricultural use. The land had become eroded and unfertile, and it was eventually abandoned. When the land was acquired, it was a goal to reforest the land as quick as possible. Much work was done by the Civilian Conservation Corps who planted many trees during the 1930s. Their camp was located in the state forest. They replanted approximately two million native hardwood trees like oak, hickory, beech, maple, and other trees like gum, aspen, ash, cherry, and walnut trees. Native pine trees are also found in the forest. The Corps also built roads, bridges, fire breaks, trails, picnic shelters, and two fire towers.
