= Perry State Forest =

Protected forest in Ohio, United States

- IUCN category V (protected landscape/seascape)
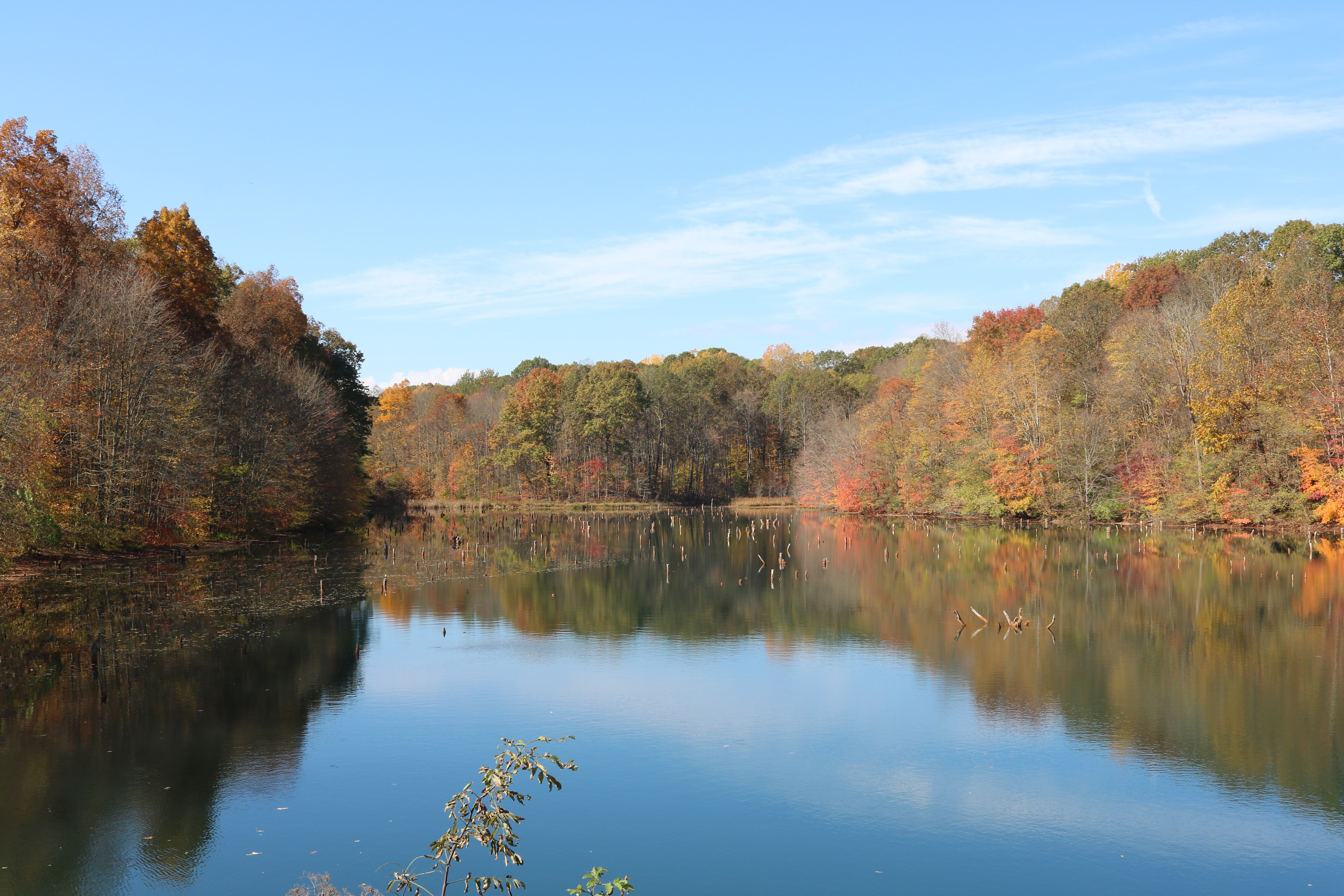
- Perry State Forest

- Location within Ohio Location within the United States
- Location: Perry County, Ohio
- Nearest city: New Lexington, OH
- Coordinates: 39.77°N 82.21°W
- Area: 4,781 acres (19.35 km^{2})
- Governing body: Ohio Department of Natural Resources

Perry State Forest is a state forest in Perry County, Ohio, United States.

The land encompassing Perry State Forest was originally used for strip mining of coal, and was acquired by the state in 1961 after the mines were abandoned. The forest has trails for hiking, horseback riding, and all-terrain vehicles.

Environmental permits for a proposed new coal mine on 500 acres of Perry State Forest land were denied in 2020, amid intense local opposition to a mine on forest property.

== See also ==
- List of Ohio state forests
- Wayne National Forest
