= Blue Rock State Forest =

Protected forest in Ohio, United States

Coordinates: 39.841°N 81.858°W

- Blue Rock Forest
- IUCN category V (protected landscape/seascape)
- Location: Muskingum County
- Nearest city: Zanesville, OH
- Area: 4,499 acres (18.21 km^{2})
- Governing body: Ohio Department of Natural Resources

Blue Rock State Forest is a state forest in Muskingum County, Ohio, United States.
