= Garrett State Forest =

Protected area in Maryland, United States

- Location within Maryland Location within the United States
- Location: Garrett County, Maryland
- Nearest city: Oakland, MD
- Coordinates: 39°29′49″N 79°27′9″W
- Area: 8,042 acres (32.54 km^{2})
- Established: 2006
- Governing body: Maryland Department of Natural Resources

Garrett State Forest is a state forest located in the state of Maryland northwest of Oakland.

Garrett State Forest is the birthplace of forestry conservation in Maryland. The generous donation of 1,917 acres originally named "Swallow Falls" by the Garrett Brothers in 1906 serves as the foundation of the Garrett State Forest, as well as Maryland's present Public Lands system. Mountain forests, streams and valleys make up the 8,042 acres of Garrett State Forest in Garrett County.

== Features ==
The forest is home to red oak, white oak, scarlet oak, black cherry, hickory, red maple, white pine and hemlock along the stream banks. Mountain streams trickle throughout the region, offering visitors glimpses of beaver ponds and cranberry bogs. Many wildlife species make their home in this forest.

The forest offers a number of recreational opportunities including cross country skiing, camping, fishing, hiking trails, historic interest, hunting, riding trails and snowmobiling.

This state forest has about 20 miles of hiking trails in between Swallow Falls and Herrington Mannor State Parks. The trails range from relatively flat and easier to intermediate and somewhat steep.

== Kindness Demonstration Area ==
Garrett State Forest includes the Kindness Demonstration Area, a 387 acres (1.57 km^{2}) tract located west of Oakland which introduces visitors to modern forest management techniques. A series of displays along a 1.25 miles (2.01 km) one-way trail explain what is occurring on the surrounding lands.
