= Brush Creek State Forest =

Protected forest in Ohio, United States

Coordinates: 38.965682°N 83.286522°W

- Brush Creek Forest
- IUCN category V (protected landscape/seascape)
- Location: Adams County
- Nearest city: Hillsboro, OH
- Area: 13,161 acres (53.26 km^{2})
- Established: 1928
- Governing body: Ohio Department of Natural Resources

Brush Creek State Forest is a state forest in Adams County, Ohio, United States.

The land it comprises was once part of Shawnee State Forest. When it became its own state forest, it was named after the nearby major stream, Scioto Brush Creek.

It contains historical stone quarries, locations for berry and mushroom harvesting, and two bridle trails, and hunting is permitted during the appropriate season.
