= Idaho Centennial Trail =

Long-distance hiking trail in the United States

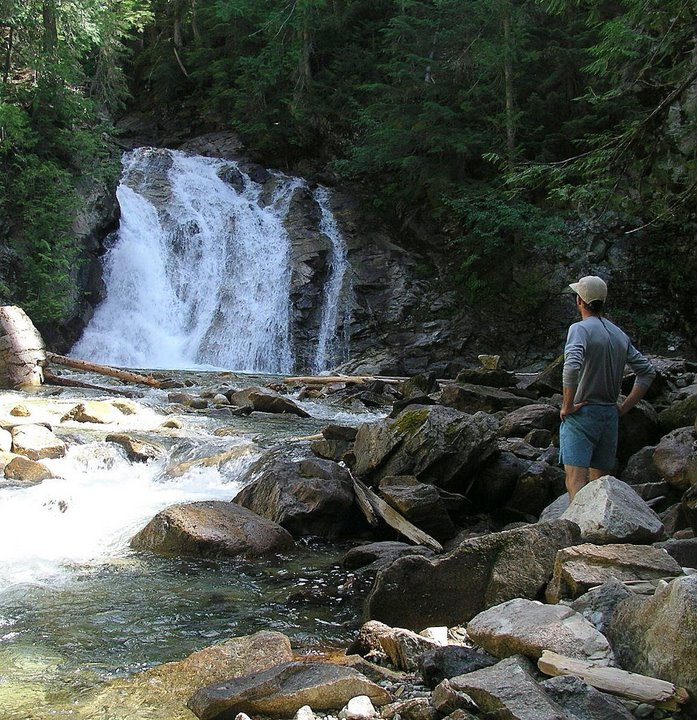
- Priest Falls, the northern terminus of the Idaho Centennial Trail.
- Length: 900 mi (1,400 km)
- Location: Idaho, United States
- Trailheads: South: Murphy Hot Springs 41°59′46″N 115°19′06″W North: Priest Falls 48°59′36″N 116°56′25″W
- Use: Hiking; Horse riding Biking
- Highest point: Approx. 9,000 feet (2,700 m)
- Lowest point: 1,900 feet (580 m)
- Difficulty: Moderate to Strenuous
- Months: May to September
- Sights: Boise National Forest, Bitterroot Mountains, Bitterroot National Forest, Clearwater National Forest, Frank Church-River of No Return Wilderness, Gospel Hump Wilderness, Nez Perce National Forest, Payette National Forest, Saylor Creek Bombing Range, Salmon-Challis National Forest, Sawtooth National Forest, Selway-Bitterroot Wilderness, Salmon River, Selway River
- Hazards: Severe Weather; Dehydration; Wildlife

The Idaho Centennial Trail (ICT) is a 995.6 mile (1602.26 km) scenic trail through the state of Idaho. It passes through various ecosystems, including high desert canyon lands in Southern Idaho to wet mountain forests in Northern Idaho. The Idaho Centennial Trail was designated as an official state trail in 1990, Idaho's centennial year.

== History ==
A trail connecting the Northern and Southern borders of Idaho was first envisioned in the 1980s. Roger Williams and Syd Tate initially conceptualized this trail in 1986. Williams and Tate made a challenging three-month-long, twelve hundred mile journey over the entire length of Idaho during which the official route was drafted.

The ICT was designated as the official state trail during Idaho's Centennial year in 1990 by the Lasting Legacy Committee of the Idaho Centennial Commission. Since then, the number of hikers completing the trail has remained low.

== Route ==
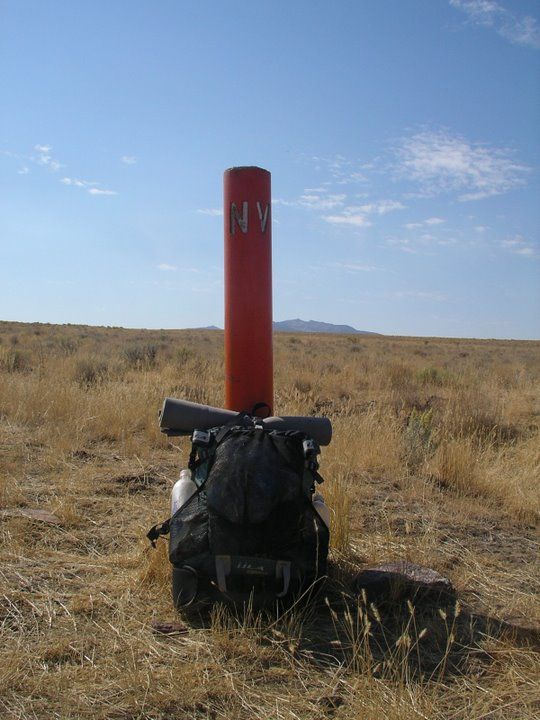
The Nevada Border, the southern terminus of the Idaho Centennial Trail.

The Idaho Centennial Trail (ICT) route is along existing trails and primitive roads. Hikers typically start at the southern trailhead near Murphy Hot Springs on the Idaho-Nevada border in early June when snow levels are starting to recede and travel northward through high desert with the goal of entering higher country before the heat of summer sets in. To complete the trail within this timeframe, the end of the trail at the Idaho-British Columbia border must then be reached before the snows of late September/early October.

The ICT is located in the Sawtooth Wilderness, the Frank Church-River of No Return Wilderness and the Selway-Bitterroot Wilderness for more than 300 miles (480 km). Within these areas, the trail borders Middle Fork of the Salmon River and the Selway River. These rivers are both designated as National Wild and Scenic Rivers, a designation due largely to Frank Church, for whom one of Idaho's Wilderness areas is named.

North of the Selway-Bitterroot, the trail moves along the Idaho-Montana border on the backbone of the Bitterroot Mountains for more than 85 miles (137 km) on high ridges. Dozens of high mountain lakes along this portion of the route are frequented by anglers and sightseers.

== Terrain ==
The trail features many climbs and descents. The Centennial Trail begins at 6,000 feet (1,800 m) near Murphy Hot Springs, descends to 2,500 feet (760 m) at the Snake River near Glenns Ferry, and then runs up and down through the mountains of Central Idaho between 3,000 and 9,000 feet (910 and 2,740 m). The trail's low point (1,900 feet (580 m) above sea level) is along the Selway River near the Moose Creek Guard Station, after which it climbs again to altitudes of 5,000 to 6,000 feet (1,500 to 1,800 m) in the Cabinet Mountains and Selkirk Mountains towards the northern boundary.

== Controlling Agencies ==
The Idaho State Centennial Trail is a cooperative effort. The Idaho Department of Parks and Recreation provides overall trail coordination. The Bureau of Land Management manages the southern section of the trail, while the U.S. Forest Service manages the middle and northern sections of the trail. Private and other public land agencies allow trail users to cross their property for continuity.
