= Ohio Department of Natural Resources =

Government agency of Ohio

Department of Natural Resources
Department overview
- Formed: 1949
- Jurisdiction: Ohio
- Headquarters: Columbus, Ohio
- Motto: To ensure a balance between wise use and protection of our natural resources for the benefit of all.
- Department executive: Mary Mertz, Director
- Website: ohiodnr.gov

The Ohio Department of Natural Resources (ODNR) is the Ohio government agency that regulates oil and gas as well as mining and manages public parks, wildlife areas, and forests in the state of Ohio. It is charged with ensuring "a balance between wise use and protection of our natural resources for the benefit of all." It publishes an annual report.

== Functions ==
ODNR regulates Ohio's oil and gas industry, the mining industry, hunting and fishing, and dams while maintaining natural resources such as state parks, state nature preserves, state wildlife areas, state forests, and state waterways. It was created in 1949 by the Ohio Legislature.

ODNR owns and manages more than 640,000 acres (260,000 ha) of land, including 75 state parks, 23 state forests, 136 state nature preserves, and 150 wildlife areas. The department has jurisdiction over more than 61,500 mi (99,000 km) of inland rivers and streams, 451 mi (726 km) of the Ohio River, and 2.29 million acres (9,300 km^{2}) of Lake Erie.

ODNR is responsible for overseeing and permitting all mineral extraction, monitoring dam safety, managing water resources, and mapping the state's major geologic structures and mineral resources. In addition, ODNR also oversees the registration of all of Ohio's watercraft and issues all of the state's hunting and fishing licenses. ODNR has two main focuses: Regulating the use of Ohio's reserve of natural resources and providing visitors with the recreational opportunities that these resources provide.

== Publications ==
ODNR publishes annual reports. It published A Legacy of Stewardship; the Ohio Department of Natural Resources, 1949-1989. In 1999 it published the "Plan for the Ohio Department of Natural Resources Division of Mines and Reclamation".

== State Forests ==
Ohio has 23 State Forests including:

- Beaver Creek State Forest
- Blue Rock State Forest
- Brush Creek State Forest
- Dean State Forest
- Fernwood State Forest
- Gifford State Forest (Ohio)
- Harrison State Forest
- Hocking State Forest
- Maumee State Forest
- Mohican-Memorial State Forest
- Perry State Forest
- Pike State Forest (Ohio)
- Richland Furnace State Forest
- Scioto Trail State Forest
- Shade River State Forest
- Shawnee State Forest
- Sunfish Creek State Forest
- Tar Hollow State Forest
- Vinton Furnace State Experimental Forest
- Yellow Creek State Forest
- Zaleski State Forest

== Nature Preserves ==
- Acadia Cliffs State Nature Preserve
- Blackhand Gorge State Nature Preserve
- Brown's Lake Bog State Nature Preserve
- Chaparral Prairie State Nature Preserve
- Clifton Gorge State Nature Preserve
- Conkle's Hollow State Nature Preserve
- Cooperrider-Kent Bog State Nature Preserve
- Culberson Woods State Nature Preserve
- Dale & Jackie Riddle State Nature Preserve
- Davey Woods State Nature Preserve
- Goll Woods State Nature Preserve
- Jackson Bog State Nature Preserve
- Kiser Lake Wetlands State Nature Preserve
- Lake Katharine State Nature Preserve
- Mantua Bog State Nature Preserve
- Marie J. Desonier State Nature Preserve
- Rockbridge State Nature Preserve
- Siegenthaler-Kaestner Esker State Nature Preserve
- Stage's Pond State Nature Preserve
- Triangle Lake Bog State Nature Preserve

== See also ==
- List of protected areas of Ohio
- Department of Natural Resources (disambiguation)
- List of state and territorial fish and wildlife management agencies in the United States
