= Burdette Park =

Park in Vanderburgh County, Indiana

- Interactive map of Burdette Park
- Location: Evansville, Indiana, United States
- Coordinates: 37.94479°N 87.640239°W
- Area: 69 ha (170 acres)
- Opened: 1936
- Operator: Vanderburgh County Board of Commissioners
- Open: 10:00AM-6:00PM
- Website: http://burdettepark.org

Burdette Park is a recreational facility in Vanderburgh County, Indiana. It is the only municipal park in Vanderburgh County not operated by the City of Evansville. Burdette Park provides a recreational and educational environment consisting of approximately 69 ha (170 acres) of wooded hills in Southwestern Indiana.

== History ==
In 1927, 16 ha (40 acres) of Evansville land were purchased by the Everett Burdette American Legion Post 187. The Post had been discussing plans to create a recreational facility for legionnaires and their families, deciding ultimately upon this plot 10 minutes west of their post in Howell. The site was chosen for its landscape and natural springs; the salt spring, in particular, would figure prominently in the development of the Legion's future park.

Work began at the site in April 1928. Volunteers helped with the preliminary clearing and the construction of the "Clubhouse," a two-story facility that still stands in the park today.

In December, 1931 Post 187 formed a non-profit committee of several of their own members to operate the park; by 1933, more than 3,000 patrons were visiting the park weekly.

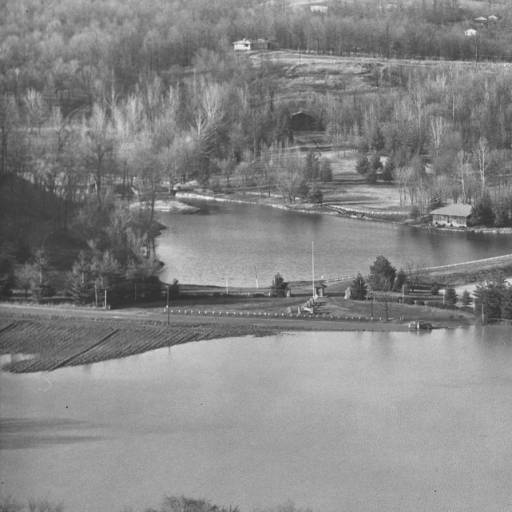
Burdette Park suffers damage during the Ohio River flood of 1937.

Development of the park continued through the Great Depression thanks to public works programs such as WPA, CWA, and FERA. The Legion deeded the park to Vanderburgh County in 1934 to qualify for these programs, which provided funding and much needed manpower. Later that same year, the Post's non-profit committee was absorbed into the county's "Burdette Park Association," which would govern the park through the cooperation of the Legion and county officials. The association held formal ceremonies in 1936 to open Burdette Park to the general public, to which approximately 15,000 people were in attendance.

When the city of Evansville was hit by the Ohio River flood of 1937, Burdette Park suffered extensive damage. Cleanup efforts allowed the park to open that summer, and $300,000 were provided through Vanderburgh County and WPA for major expansion and renovation that took place in 1938.

Park attendance declined during World War II. Plans began in 1945 to renovate existing facilities and to construct a new dance pavilion, which was finished in 1946. While Burdette Park enjoyed several good post-war years, revenues again began to decline in 1948, continuing to do so through 1950. The Burdette Park Association required $5,000 from the county to make necessary repairs to the salt pool and the roller-skating rink before the park could open that year; the association notified Vanderburgh County that it would no longer be able to operate Burdette Park after the year ended.

The county agreed to take over operations, and in March, 1951, the Vanderburgh County Park Board was created. The change in management, along with the advent of daylight saving time, was expected to boost revenues for the park. In 1954, however, the salt well that fed into Burdette Park's salt pool began to go dry; constant maintenance was required to keep the pool open and operating according to Health Department standards. By 1956, plans were being discussed for extending city water service to Burdette Park.

Park attendance had declined again by 1959 due to worsening conditions at the salt pool. The Vanderburgh County Park Board worked in cooperation with the city of Evansville to extend an 3,400-meter (11,000 ft) waterline to the park, making it possible to move forward on plans to construct a new swimming facility, fresh water facilities, and sewage facilities.

A $300,000 bond issue was approved in 1960 to begin construction on an Olympic size swimming facility to replace the salt pool. The new pool opened on August 19, 1961, and remains one of the largest swimming facilities in the Midwest.
