= Pike State Forest (Ohio) =

Protected forest in Ohio, United States

- Location within Ohio Location within the United States
- Location: Western Pike County/Eastern Highland County, Ohio, USA
- Coordinates: 39°09′30″N 83°13′45″W
- Area: 12,084.3 acres (48.9 km^{2})
- Established: 1924
- Governing body: Ohio Department of Natural Resources

Pike State Forest is a state forest in the state of Ohio. Located off State Route 124, it covers an area of 12,084 acres (48.90 km^{2}) in western Pike County and eastern Highland County.

== History ==
In 1924 the acquisition for the lands of the forest began, with the objective of restoring damaged woodland affected by fire and human interference to a form of protection. In the 1930s the Civilian Conservation Corps and the Division of Forestry undertook much of the restoration work.

== Landscape and resources ==
Pike State Forest, whilst a protected area, offers a wide range of recreational activities, and the area is open to the public from April 1 to November 30 every year. It has 33 miles (53 km) of trails for hiking and horse riding, 10 miles (16 km) of trail open to motorcycles and off-road all-terrain vehicles. In season, Pike State Forest is also open to public hunting and fishing. Anderson Lake within the forest is a popular spot for fishing.
