= Fernwood State Forest =

Protected forest in Ohio, United States

Coordinates: 40°19′23″N 80°42′36″W

Fernwood State Forest is a state forest in Jefferson County, Ohio, United States.
