= Harrison State Forest =

Protected forest in Ohio, United States

- Harrison Forest
- Location within Ohio Location within the United States
- Location: Harrison County
- Nearest city: Cadiz, Ohio
- Coordinates: 40°20′N 81°0′W
- Area: 1,338 acres (5.41 km^{2})
- Established: 1961
- Governing body: City of Athens

Harrison State Forest is a state forest in Harrison County, Ohio, United States.

== History ==
The park was acquired in 1961. A large proportion of the land was cleared for coal mining. Nevertheless, the extraction of acid mine water is minimal because of the neutralizing effect of limestone deposits. Most of the uncultivated land is located on ridges or in valleys and is covered with forest. Subsequent reforestation and the installation of recreational facilities, funded by the Appalachian Regional Development Act of 1965 and the Ohio State Capital Improvement Program, have brought the area into a state suitable for public use.

In 1992 and 1993, forests were restored in two districts. More than 100,000 trees were planted on 186 acres. There are two campsites with picnic tables, fire rings and vaulted restrooms.
