= Tar Hollow State Forest =

Protected forest in Ohio, United States

Coordinates: 39°22′N 82°46′W

- IUCN category V (protected landscape/seascape)
- Location: Hocking, Ross and Vinton counties, Ohio
- Nearest city: Laurelville, OH
- Area: 16,120 acres (65.2 km^{2})
- Established: 1958
- Governing body: Ohio Department of Natural Resources

Tar Hollow State Forest is a state forest in Hocking, Ross, and Vinton counties in the U.S. state of Ohio. It is part of an area of protected land that also includes Tar Hollow State Park.

Tar Hollow State Forest originated from the Ross-Hocking Land Utilization project of the 1930s. The purpose of the program was to locate families to more productive land, thereby enabling them to better sustain a living. Following termination of the project, the land was leased to the Division of Forestry, and finally transferred to the State in 1958. Tar Hollow is Ohio's third largest state forest, containing 16,120 acres.
