= Dilan =

Kurdish name

- Gender: Feminine
- Language: Kurdish

Origin
- Origin: Kurdish
- Meaning: Joy, happiness; from Kurdish dil (دڵ) meaning “heart”
- Region of origin: Kurdish regions of Iraq, Turkey, and Iran

Dilan (/ˈdiː.lɑːn/) is a unisex given name with multiple origins, commonly used among Kurdish and Welsh communities. Dilan is also a surname.

== Etymology ==
In Kurdish, Dilan (Kurdish: دیلان) refers to a traditional Kurdish dance that symbolizes joy and happiness. The name derives in part from the Kurdish word dil (Kurdish: دڵ), meaning "heart". As such, Dilan conveys a sense of warmth, emotion, and affection.

== Usage ==
Dilan is widely used as a given name for girls in Kurdish-speaking regions. The name reflects values of liveliness, community, and emotional expression in Kurdish culture.

== Variants and distinction ==
Common variants include Dîlan (with a circumflex accent used in Kurdish Latin script) which is homonymous but distinct from the masculine Welsh name Dylan/Dilan, which has a different origin and pronunciation (/ˈdɪl.ən/), and Đilan, the old name for Gjilan (Serbian: Gnjilane).

== People with the given name ==
=== Female ===
- Dilan Ağgül (born 1998), Turkish-German footballer
- Dilan Çiçek Deniz (born 1995), Turkish actress, model and beauty pageant titleholder
- Dilan Deniz Gökçek (born 1976), Turkish football official
- Dilan Gwyn (born 1987), Swedish actress
- Dilan Yeşim Taşkın (born 2001), Austrian-Turkish footballer
- Dilan Yeşilgöz (born 1977), Dutch politician

=== Male ===
- Dilan Chandima (born 1990), Sinhalese cricketer
- Dilan Fernando (born 1985), Italian-Sinhalese cricketer
- Dilan Jay (born 1980), Sri Lankan-American actor
- Dilan Jayalath (born 1997), Sinhalese cricketer
- Dilan Jayawardane (born 1982), Sinhalese engineer
- Dilan Markanday (born 2001), English footballer
- Dilan Ortiz (born 2000), Colombian football player
- Dilan Perera (born 1962), Sinhalese politician
- Dilan Prašović (born 1994), Montenegrin professional boxer
- Dilan Ramanayake (born 1980), Sri Lankan former cricketer
- Dilan Raj (born 1972), Sri Lankan cricket player and coach
- Dilan Rojas (born 2004), Chilean soccer player
- Dilan Savenkov (born 2001), Estonian ice hockey player
- Dilan Suraweera (born 1997), Sinhalese cricketer
- Dilan Woutersz (born 1977), Sinhalese cricketer
- Dilan Zúñiga (born 1996), Chilean footballer
- Dillan Ismail (born 1992), Swedish footballer

=== Fictional characters ===
- Dilan, the original identity of Xaldin from the Kingdom Hearts series

== People with the surname ==
- Erik Martin Dilan, American politician and New York City Council member
- Martin Malave Dilan, American politician and New York City Council member
- Muhamad Salih Dilan, Kurdish poet
- Şehnaz Dilan (born 1960), Turkish female footballer, model, actress and singer

== See also ==
- Đilan, the old name for Gjilan (Serbian: Gnjilane)
- Dylan (disambiguation)
- Dilan (movie), a 1986 Turkish movie by Erden Kıran
