= Columbus metropolitan area, Ohio =

Columbus metropolitan area
- Metropolitan Statistical Area
- Columbus, OH Metropolitan Statistical Area
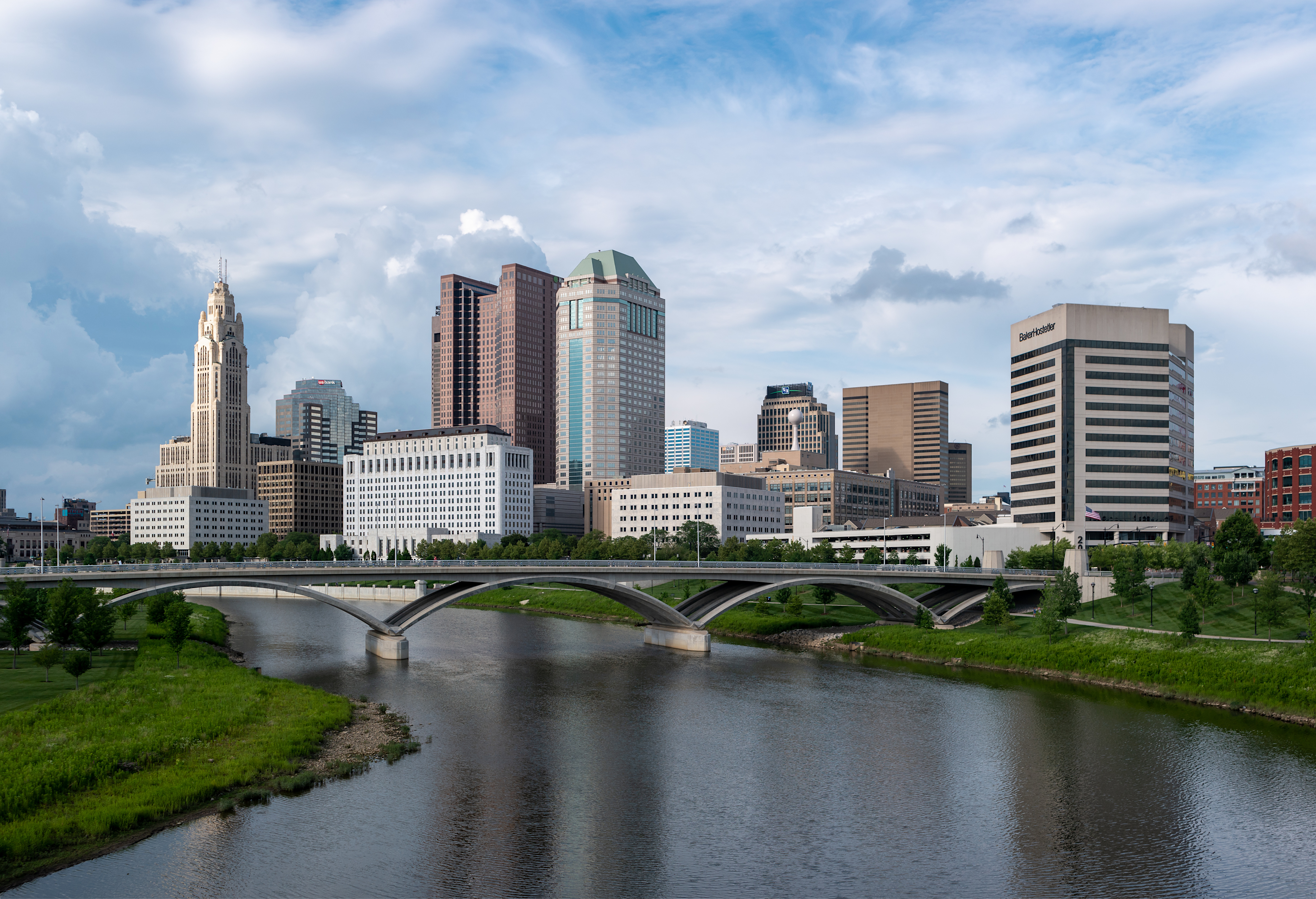
- Downtown Columbus, Ohio
Columbus–Marion–Zanesville, OH CSA
City of Columbus
Columbus MSA
Zanesville µSA
Chillicothe µSA
Marion µSA
Mount Vernon µSA
Athens µSA
Bellefontaine µSA
Cambridge µSA
Washington C.H. µSA
- Coordinates: 40°N 83°W
- Country: United States
- State: Ohio
- Largest city: Columbus
- Other cities: Dublin; Gahanna; Newark; Delaware; Lancaster; Pickerington; London; Marysville; Circleville; Westerville; Marion; Zanesville; Chillicothe; Athens

Area
  - Total: 3,169.2 sq mi (8,208 km^{2})
- Highest elevation: 1,480 ft (450 m)
- Lowest elevation: 630 ft (192 m)

Population (2024 estimate)
  - Total: 2,225,377
  - Rank: 32nd in the U.S.
  - Density: 490/sq mi (189.3/km^{2})

GDP
  - Total: $182.088 billion (2023)

The Columbus metropolitan area is a metropolitan area in Central Ohio surrounding the state capital of Columbus. As defined by the U.S. Census Bureau, it includes the counties of Delaware, Fairfield, Franklin, Hocking, Licking, Madison, Morrow, Perry, Pickaway and Union. At the 2020 census, the MSA had a population of 2,138,926, making it 32nd-most populous in the United States and the second largest in Ohio, behind the Cincinnati metropolitan area. The metro area, also known as Central Ohio or Greater Columbus, is one of the largest and fastest-growing metropolitan areas in the Midwestern United States.

The larger combined statistical area (the Columbus–Marion–Zanesville, OH CSA) adds the counties of Athens, Fayette, Guernsey, Knox, Logan, Marion, Muskingum, and Ross. It includes the Micropolitan Statistical Areas of Athens, Bellefontaine, Cambridge, Chillicothe, Marion, Mount Vernon, Washington Court House, and Zanesville, due to strong ties with Columbus. The population of the CSA was 2,544,048 at the 2020 census, 26th largest in the nation and ranking second in Ohio behind the Cleveland–Akron–Canton combined statistical area.

== Population ==
Historical population
Census	Pop.	Note	%±
1900	164,460		—
1910	221,567		34.7%
1920	263,951		19.1%
1930	361,095		36.8%
1940	386,712		7.1%
1950	503,410		30.2%
1960	977,790		94.2%
1970	1,170,780		19.7%
1980	1,270,313		8.5%
1990	1,405,168		10.6%
2000	1,612,694		14.8%
2010	1,901,974		17.9%
2020	2,138,926		12.5%
2025 (est.)	2,242,028		4.8%
data source:

County	2025 Estimate	2020 Census	%±	Area	Density
Franklin County	1,361,536	1,323,807	+2.85%	539.87 sq mi (1,398.3 km^{2})	2,522/sq mi (974/km^{2})
Delaware County	242,032	214,124	+13.03%	442.41 sq mi (1,145.8 km^{2})	547/sq mi (211/km^{2})
Licking County	185,564	178,519	+3.95%	686.50 sq mi (1,778.0 km^{2})	270/sq mi (104/km^{2})
Fairfield County	169,752	158,921	+6.82%	505.11 sq mi (1,308.2 km^{2})	336/sq mi (130/km^{2})
Union County	73,446	62,784	+16.98%	436.65 sq mi (1,130.9 km^{2})	168/sq mi (65/km^{2})
Pickaway County	62,978	58,539	+7.58%	501.91 sq mi (1,299.9 km^{2})	125/sq mi (48/km^{2})
Madison County	46,985	43,824	+7.21%	465.44 sq mi (1,205.5 km^{2})	101/sq mi (39/km^{2})
Morrow County	36,305	34,950	+3.88%	406.22 sq mi (1,052.1 km^{2})	89/sq mi (35/km^{2})
Perry County	35,918	35,408	+1.44%	409.78 sq mi (1,061.3 km^{2})	88/sq mi (34/km^{2})
Hocking County	27,512	28,050	−1.92%	422.75 sq mi (1,094.9 km^{2})	65/sq mi (25/km^{2})
Total	2,242,028	2,138,926	+4.82%	4,816.64 sq mi (12,475.0 km^{2})	465/sq mi (180/km^{2})

== Politics ==
Columbus metro presidential election results
Year	Democratic	Republican	Third parties
2024	52.0% 544,350	47.0% 492,312	1.0% 10,267
2020	53.3% 567,327	45.1% 480,172	1.6% 16,713
2016	50.0% 475,027	45.2% 429,930	4.8% 45,295
2012	53.5% 492,084	46.5% 426,936	0% 0

2024 presidential election in Columbus metro area

== Main cities ==
Delaware County

- Columbus (partial)
- Delaware
- Dublin (partial)
- Powell
- Westerville (partial)

Fairfield County

- Columbus (partial)
- Canal Winchester (partial)
- Lancaster
- Pickerington (partial)
- Reynoldsburg (partial)

Franklin County

- Columbus (partial)
- Bexley
- Canal Winchester (partial)
- Dublin (partial)
- Gahanna
- Grandview Heights
- Grove City
- Groveport
- Hilliard
- New Albany (partial)
- Pickerington (partial)
- Reynoldsburg (partial)
- Upper Arlington
- Westerville (partial)
- Whitehall
- Worthington

Hocking County

- Logan

Licking County

- Newark
- Heath
- Pataskala
- Reynoldsburg (partial)

Madison County

- London

Morrow County

- Galion (partial)

Perry County

- New Lexington

Pickaway County

- Circleville

Union County

- Dublin (partial)
- Marysville

== Economy ==
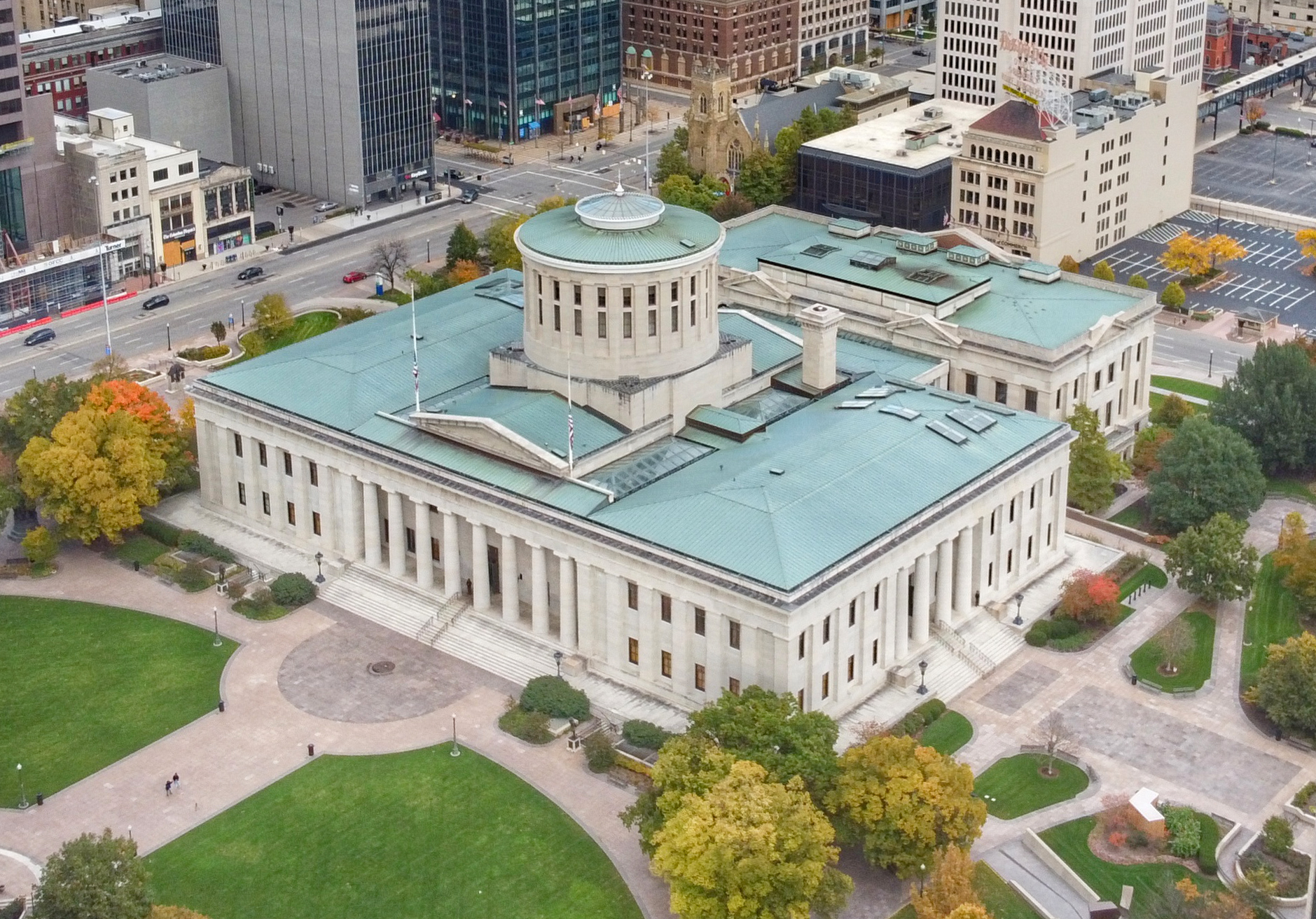
The Ohio Statehouse

The public sector dominates the Central Ohio employment landscape, with the State of Ohio, Ohio State University, and the United States Government accounting for an estimated 55,000 to 60,000 employees. When combined with Columbus City Schools, the City of Columbus, and Franklin County, the number swells to about 80,000 employees, making government jobs the area's largest employment sector.

The financial sector provides the second largest employment sector in Central Ohio. JPMorgan Chase is the area's largest financial sector employer, with Columbus-based insurance company Nationwide Insurance a close second. Also headquartered in Columbus is Huntington Bank, with significant presence by banks such as KeyBank, Fifth Third, PNC Financial Services, Park National Corporation, and Commerce National Bank. Recently, Alliance Data, a Fortune 500 Company that provides financial services to the financial sector, has moved its headquarters to Columbus. In addition to Nationwide, other insurance-based companies in Central Ohio include Encova, Grange Insurance, Safe Auto Insurance, and Root Insurance. The manufacturing sector includes Honda, which operates their largest North American manufacturing complex in the Marysville area. Also in Marysville is Scotts Miracle-Gro Company, the makers of Miracle-Gro and various other soil and potting fertilizers. New Albany was selected by Intel for their newest semiconductor fabrication plant, which will open in 2025 and is expected to become "the largest silicon manufacturing location on the planet." Located in downtown Columbus is AEP, which is one of the largest electric utility companies in the US. Mettler Toledo, a manufacturer of precision scales and scientific equipment, is based in the area known as Polaris. Worthington Industries, a large steel-processing company, is primarily located on the north side of Columbus near Worthington. The Ashland Inc. company has a large office space within Dublin. Homebuilders M/I Homes and Dominion Homes are located in Columbus.

Anheuser-Busch operates one of their 12 breweries on the north side of Columbus. Hexion Specialty Chemicals (formerly part of Borden) is located in downtown Columbus. The Abbott Nutrition Division of Abbott Laboratories, makers of Ensure nutritional drink and Similac infant formula, is also headquartered in Columbus. T. Marzetti Company, the largest food manufacturer headquartered in Central Ohio, is headquartered in Westerville, and Wyandot Snacks operates out of Marion, Ohio.

The retail sector's biggest employer is clothing company L Brands. Retail brands within the L Brands corporate umbrella include Victoria's Secret, Pink (Victoria's Secret), Bath & Body Works, La Senza, and Henri Bendel. Companies that have been spun off from L Brands that are still headquartered in Central Ohio include Abercrombie & Fitch, Lane Bryant, and Tween Brands, formerly Limited Too. Another apparel and furniture company located in Columbus is Retail Ventures. Their operating stores include DSW, Filene's Basement, American Signature, Rooms Today and Value City. The department store holding company Federated Department Stores was once based in Columbus, and included the Lazarus department store chain, before being re-branded under the Macy's brand name in 2005.

Central Ohio is home to three large fast food chains. Wendy's has its corporate headquarters in Dublin, while White Castle and Sbarro are located in Columbus. Smaller chains Charley's Grilled Subs, City Barbeque, and Steak Escape are Columbus-based as well. Cameron Mitchell Restaurants, Bob Evans Restaurants, Max & Erma's, Damon's Grill and Donatos Pizza are also based in the city. Chipotle Mexican Grill has a corporate office with over 250 employees in the city's arena district.

In the health care sector is Cardinal Health, which is the highest-ranked Ohio-based company on the Fortune 500 list, and has its headquarters along I-270 in Dublin. Also in the health services sector is OhioHealth, which is a leading HMO.

Central Ohio has a well-established tech sector as well. The Online Computer Library Center (owner of the Dewey Decimal System) is located across from Cardinal on the other side of I-270. Microcenter, a retailer of computers and other electronic equipment, was started in Upper Arlington and is now based in Hilliard. A number of science-based companies also reside in Columbus, including Chemical Abstracts and the Battelle Memorial Institute R&D company. CompuServe was an independent firm headquartered and operated within Columbus before being acquired by WorldCom and AOL. Sterling Commerce (acquired by IBM in 2010) was headquartered near Dublin, adjacent to a large Qwest (now CenturyLink) facility. Also in Dublin is the regional office of Quest Software (formerly a part of Dell).

Columbus also has a booming start-up culture. There are several business incubators and multiple resources available to help Central Ohio's small business community thrive. There is also a yearly Startup Weekend workshop. In 2011, a startup founded by two locals gave Central Ohio its own social networking website, Cbusr.com. Cbusr attracts more than 35,000 active monthly users ranging from entrepreneurs and creative professionals to musicians who meet online and connect offline at events.

== Transportation ==
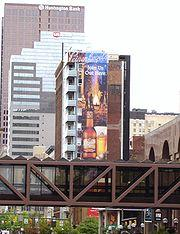
Columbus has numerous pedestrian skywalks linking downtown buildings.

=== Grid and address system ===
The metro area's street plan originates downtown and extends into the old-growth neighborhoods, following a grid pattern with the intersection of High Street (running north–south) and Broad Street (running east–west) at its center. North–south streets run 12 degrees west of due north, parallel to High Street; the avenues (vis. Fifth Avenue, Sixth Avenue, Seventh Avenue, and so on.) run east–west. The address system begins its numbering at the intersection of Broad and High, with numbers increasing in magnitude with distance from Broad or High. Numbered Avenues begin with First Avenue, about 0.25 mi (0.40 km) north of Broad Street, and increase in number as one progresses northward. Numbered streets begin with Second Street, which is two blocks west of High Street, and Third Street, which is a block east of High Street, then progress eastward from there. Even-numbered addresses are on the north and east sides of streets, putting odd addresses on the south and west sides of streets. A difference of 700 house numbers means a distance of about 1 mi (1.6 km) (along the same street). For example, 351 W 5th Avenue is approximately 0.5 mi (800 m) west of High Street on the south side of Fifth Avenue. Buildings along north–south streets are numbered in a similar manner: the building number indicates the approximate distance from Broad Street, the prefixes 'N' and 'S' indicate whether that distance is to measured to the north or south of Broad Street, and the street number itself indicates how far the street is from the center of the city at the intersection of Broad and High.

This street numbering system does not hold true over a large area. The area served by numbered avenues runs from about Marble Cliff to South Linden to the Airport, and the area served by numbered Streets covers Downtown and nearby neighborhoods to the east and south, with only a few exceptions. There are quite few intersections between numbered Streets and Avenues. Furthermore, named streets and avenues can have any orientation. For example, while all of the numbered avenues run east–west, perpendicular to High Street, many named, non-numbered avenues run north–south, parallel to High. The same is true of many named streets: while the numbered streets in the city run north–south, perpendicular to Broad Street, many named, non-numbered streets run east–west, perpendicular to High Street.

=== Highways ===
Columbus is bisected by two major Interstate Highways, Interstate 70 running east–west, and Interstate 71 running north to roughly southwest. The two Interstates combine downtown for about 1.5 mi (2.4 km) in an area locally known as "The Split", which is a major traffic congestion point within Columbus, especially during rush hour. U.S. Route 40, originally known as the National Road, runs east–west through Columbus, comprising Main Street to the east of downtown and Broad Street to the west. U.S. Route 23 runs roughly north–south, while U.S. Route 33 runs northwest-to-southeast. The Interstate 270 Outerbelt encircles the vast majority of the city, while the newly redesigned Innerbelt consists of the Interstate 670 spur on the north side (which continues to the east past the airport and to the west where it merges with I-70), State Route 315 on the west side, the I-70/71 split on the south side, and I-71 on the east. Due to its central location within Ohio and abundance of outbound roadways, nearly all of the state's destinations are within a 2- or 3-hour drive of Columbus.

=== Bridges ===
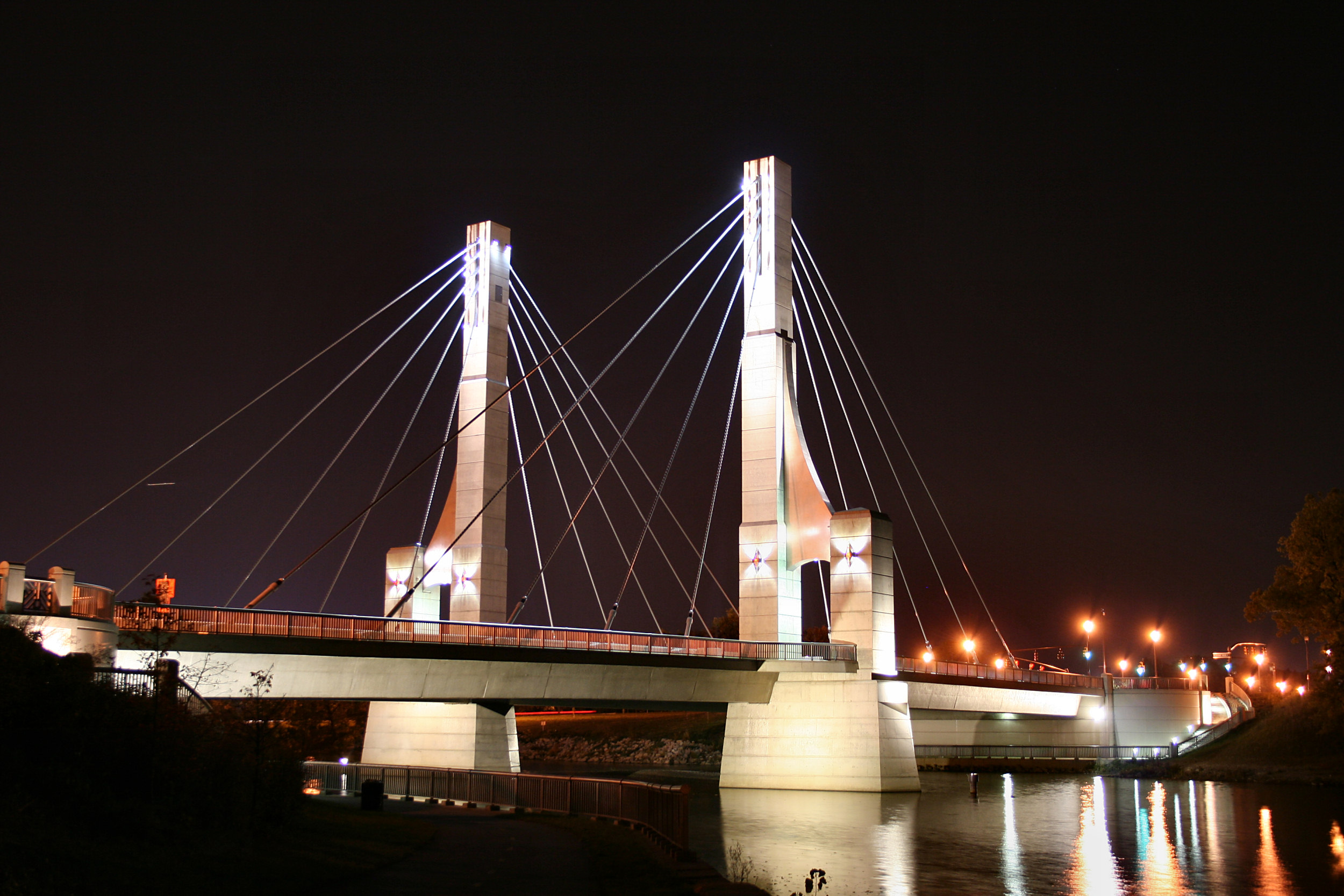
Lane Avenue Bridge, University District

The Columbus riverfront hosts a few notable bridges which have been built since 2000. The 700 ft (210 m) Main Street Bridge opened on July 30, 2010, and is the first bridge of its kind in North America. The bridge is located directly south of COSI on the Scioto river, featuring three lanes of traffic (one westbound and two eastbound) and another separated lane for pedestrians and bikes. The Rich Street Bridge opened in July 2012 and is adjacent to the Main Street Bridge connecting Rich Street on the east side of the river with Town Street on the west. The Lane Avenue Bridge is a cable-stayed bridge that opened on November 14, 2003, in the University District and spans the Olentangy river with three lanes of traffic each way.

=== Airports ===
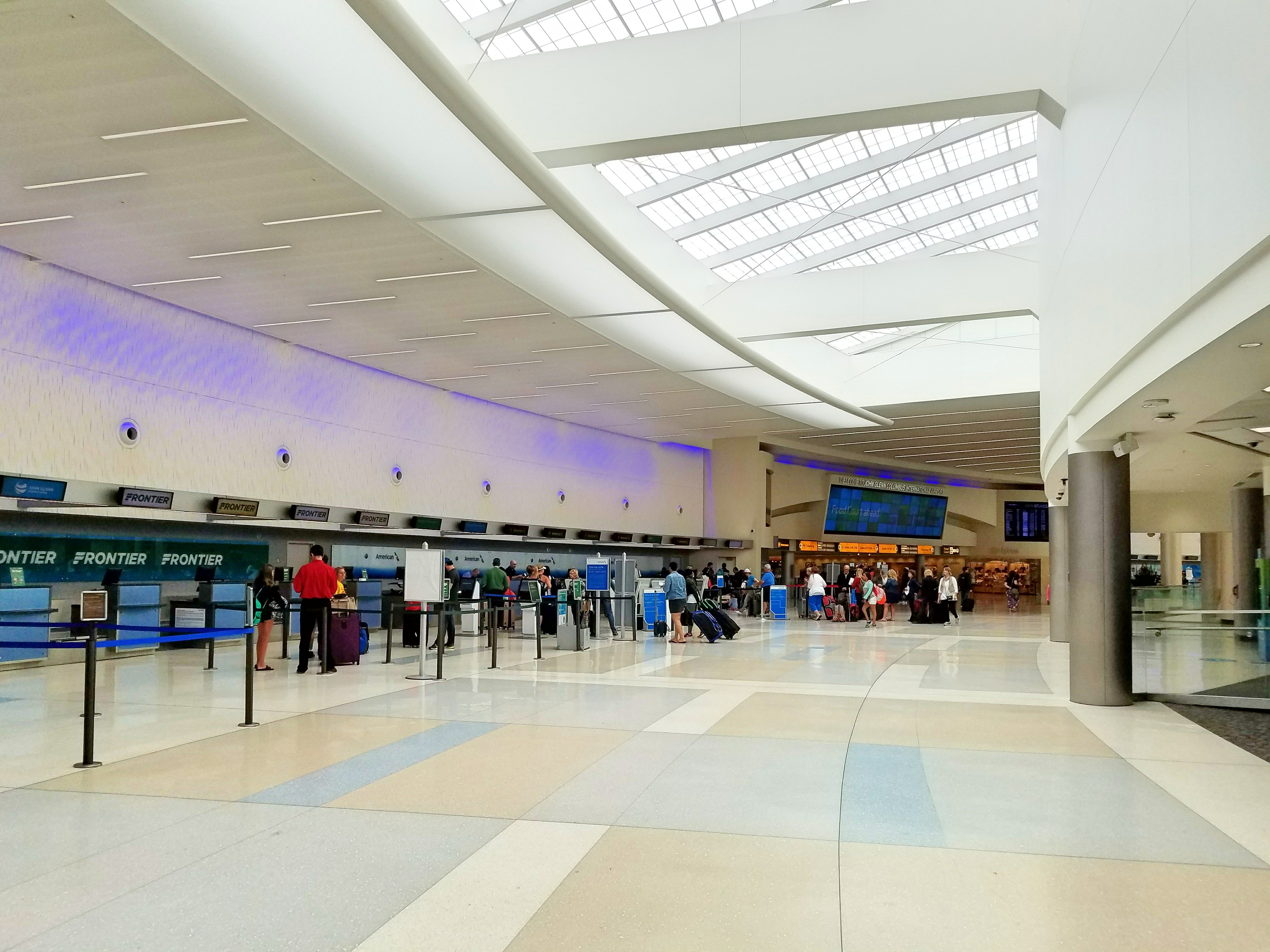
John Glenn Columbus International Airport departure level

The metro area's primary airport, John Glenn Columbus International Airport, is located on the east side of the city of Columbus, with several smaller airports in the region as well. John Glenn Columbus International provides service to Toronto, Canada and Cancun, Mexico (on a seasonal basis), as well as to most domestic destinations, including all the major hubs. Northern California is serviced by flights to and from San Francisco and Oakland, and Southern California flights go to and from Los Angeles International Airport.

John Glenn Columbus International Airport continues to be a home to NetJets, the world's largest fractional ownership air carrier. According to a 2005 market survey, John Glenn Columbus (Port Columbus) International Airport attracts about 50% of its passengers from outside its 60-mile (97 km) radius primary service region. John Glenn Columbus International Airport is currently the 50th-busiest airport in the United States by total passenger boardings.

The second major airport in the metro area is Rickenbacker International Airport, located in southern Franklin County. It is a major cargo facility and is utilized by the Ohio Air National Guard. Allegiant Air offers nonstop service from Rickenbacker to various Florida destinations and seasonally to other cities such as Jacksonville, Myrtle Beach, New Orleans, and Savannah GA.

Ohio State University Don Scott Airport and Bolton Field are significant general-aviation facilities in the Columbus area.

=== Mass transit ===
Columbus maintains a widespread municipal bus service called the Central Ohio Transit Authority (COTA). Intercity bus service is provided from the Columbus Bus Station and other locations by Greyhound, Barons Bus Lines, Miller Transportation, GoBus, and other carriers.

Currently, Columbus does not have any type of passenger rail service. Columbus used to have a major train station downtown called Union Station, most notably as a stop along Amtrak's National Limited train service until 1977. The station itself was razed in 1979, and the Greater Columbus Convention Center now stands in its place. The station was also a stop along the Cleveland, Columbus and Cincinnati Railroad and the Pittsburgh, Cincinnati, Chicago and St. Louis Railroad. Columbus is now the largest metropolitan area in the U.S. without either a local rail or intercity rail connection (Phoenix opened a light-rail system in 2008, but still lacks an Amtrak connection), however studies are underway towards reintroducing passenger rail service to Columbus via the Ohio Hub project. Plans are in the works to open a high-speed rail service connecting Columbus with Cincinnati and to the proposed hub in Cleveland which offers rail service to the East Coast, including New York and Washington, DC.

=== Bicycle ===
Cycling as transportation is steadily increasing in Columbus with its relatively flat terrain, intact urban neighborhoods, large student population, and off-road bike paths. The city has put forth the 2012 Bicentennial Bikeways Plan as well as a move toward a Complete Streets policy. Grassroots efforts such as Bike To Work Week, Consider Biking, Yay Bikes, Third Hand Bicycle Co-op, Franklinton Cycleworks, and Cranksters, a local radio program focused on urban cycling, have contributed to cycling as transportation.

Columbus also hosts urban cycling "off-shots" with messenger-style "alleycat" races as well as unorganized group rides, a monthly Critical Mass ride, bicycle polo, art showings, movie nights, and a variety of bicycle-friendly businesses and events throughout the year. All this activity occurs despite Columbus's frequently inclement weather.

The new Main Street Bridge features a dedicated bike and pedestrian lane separated from traffic, as does the Rich Street Bridge.

The city has its own public bicycle system. CoGo Bike Share has a network of about 600 bicycles and 80 docking stations. PBSC Urban Solutions, a company based in Canada, supplies technology and equipment.

== Education ==
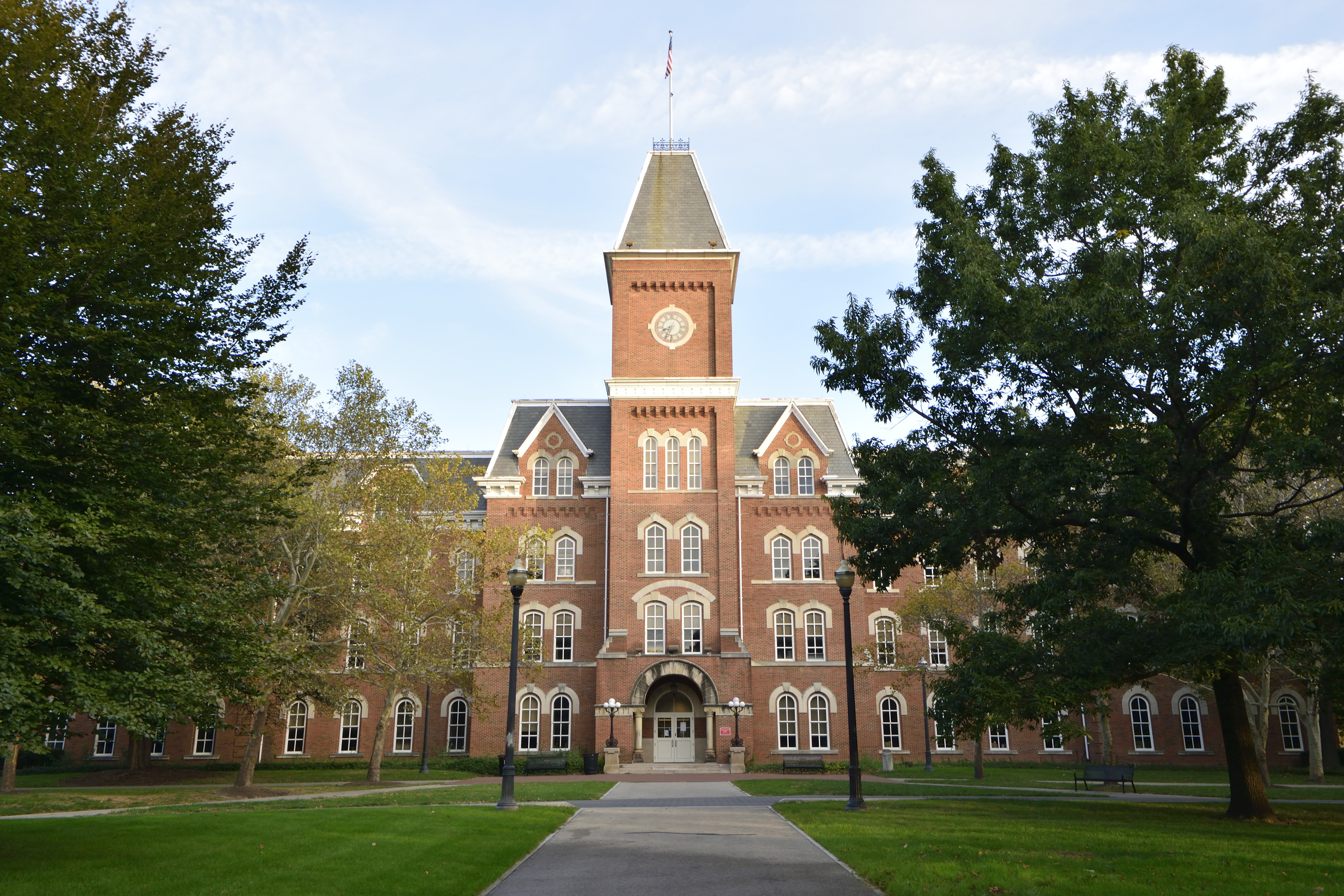
University Hall at the Ohio State University in Columbus, Ohio's largest university by enrollment

Numerous K–12 school districts are found in the area. There are wide differences in setup, with some districts being mostly rural and having a small enrollment, while others are urban and have large enrollments.

Dozens of institutions of higher education can be found in the area, the largest of which is Ohio State University in Columbus. Three of the prestigious Five Colleges of Ohio are located in the metro. They include Ohio Wesleyan University, located in Delaware, Denison University, in Granville (near Newark) and Kenyon College in Gambier. Other schools include Otterbein University in Westerville, OSU Newark (a branch campus of Ohio State University), Central Ohio Technical College (also in Newark), OU Lancaster (a branch campus of Ohio University), Capital University in Bexley, Franklin University, Columbus State Community College, the Pontifical College Josephinum, the Methodist Theological School in Delaware, Ohio Dominican University, Columbus College of Art & Design, and Mount Vernon Nazarene University.

== Culture ==
=== Museums ===
Numerous museums are located throughout the metropolis. COSI features exhibits, demonstrations, IMAX films, and activities. The Columbus Museum of Art houses a collection of art and hosts many interesting exhibits throughout the year. Perkins Observatory is located just south of Delaware. The observatory hosts public programs, and serves as the home for the Columbus Astronomical Society. The Ohio Railway Museum, located in Worthington, features a large collection of both static and operational railway equipment. In Hilliard, a unique museum exists in the form of the Early Television Museum. This attraction features a large collection of TVs from the 1920s, 1930s, and 1940s. The Bruce Lee Legends of Martial Art Hall of Fame Museum is located in Reynoldsburg. Pickerington is the site of the Motorcycle Hall of Fame. Also in the area is the Mid-Ohio Historical Museum, located in Canal Winchester. Collections found here include thousands of antique and modern children's toys, a train display, and a miniature circus. Historical memorabilia can be found at the Motts Military Museum, located in Groveport.

=== Performing arts ===
Columbus is the home of many renowned performing arts institutions, including Opera Columbus, BalletMet, the Columbus Symphony Orchestra, the Contemporary American Theatre Company (CATCo), Shadowbox Cabaret and the Columbus Jazz Orchestra. Throughout the summer, the Actors' Theatre offers free performances of Shakespearean plays in an open-air amphitheatre located in German Village.

There are numerous large concert venues in Columbus, including arenas such as Nationwide Arena, Value City Arena, and Mapfre Stadium. Kemba Live (formerly known as Express Live, the Lifestyle Communities Pavilion, and the PromoWest Pavilion), and the Newport Music Hall, round out the city's music performance spaces. In 2006, funding was allocated to renovate and reopen the Lincoln Theatre, which was formerly a center for Black culture in Columbus. Not far from the Lincoln Theatre is the King Arts Complex, which hosts various cultural events. The city also has a number of theatres downtown, including the historic Palace Theatre, the Ohio Theatre, the Southern Theatre, and the Riffe Center which houses The Capitol Theatre as well as two studio theatres. Most area theaters including the Ohio, Palace, Southern, Riffe, Lincoln, Drexel, McCoy Center for the Arts, and Hinson Amphitheater are owned and operated or managed by the Columbus Association for the Performing Arts, a nonprofit formed in 1969 to save the Ohio Theatre from demolition. Much of the growth in entertainment capacity in Columbus has been recent. The construction of the Crew Stadium, Nationwide Arena, Value City Arena, the Greater Columbus Convention Center, and the Lifestyle Communities Pavilion are all projects completed since 1990.

=== Fairs and festivals ===
Events taking place within the Greater Columbus area include the Ohio State Fair, one of the largest state fairs in the United States, as well as the Little Brown Jug, a world-famous harness racing event taking place in Delaware. Comfest (officially The Community Festival) is arguably the largest free, non-corporate urban music and arts festival in the United States featuring 6 stages of music over 3 days in downtown's Goodale Park and has occurred annually in late June since 1972. Each year, Dublin hosts the Dublin Irish Festival, which attracts tens of thousands of people for a weekend of Irish food, music, and dance. Upper Arlington hosts its own arts festival annually on Labor Day, taking up a large portion of Northam Park. The Franklin County Fair is held annually in Hilliard.

The Columbus Arts Festival is a huge arts festival held each summer that attracts well-known and talented artists from all around the country. The fair features hundreds of artists of all types, several stages with musical performances, art-related activities for children, and traditional fair food as well as food from area restaurants.

Columbus also hosts a Latino Festival, Jazz & Rib Festival, International Festival, Asian Festival, and a citywide Fourth of July celebration (Red, White & Boom).

Located southeast of Columbus, Lancaster is host to the annual Lancaster Festival, a 10-day celebration of music and the arts. The Festival has its own orchestra and draws visitors from all over the region.

Nearby Circleville is home to the annual Circleville Pumpkin Show. This is known as Ohio's largest festival for drawing in an average 100,000 people per day to the community of less than 15,000 residents.

Marion annually hosts its Popcorn Festival in early September, said to be the largest of its kind in the world.

== Sports ==
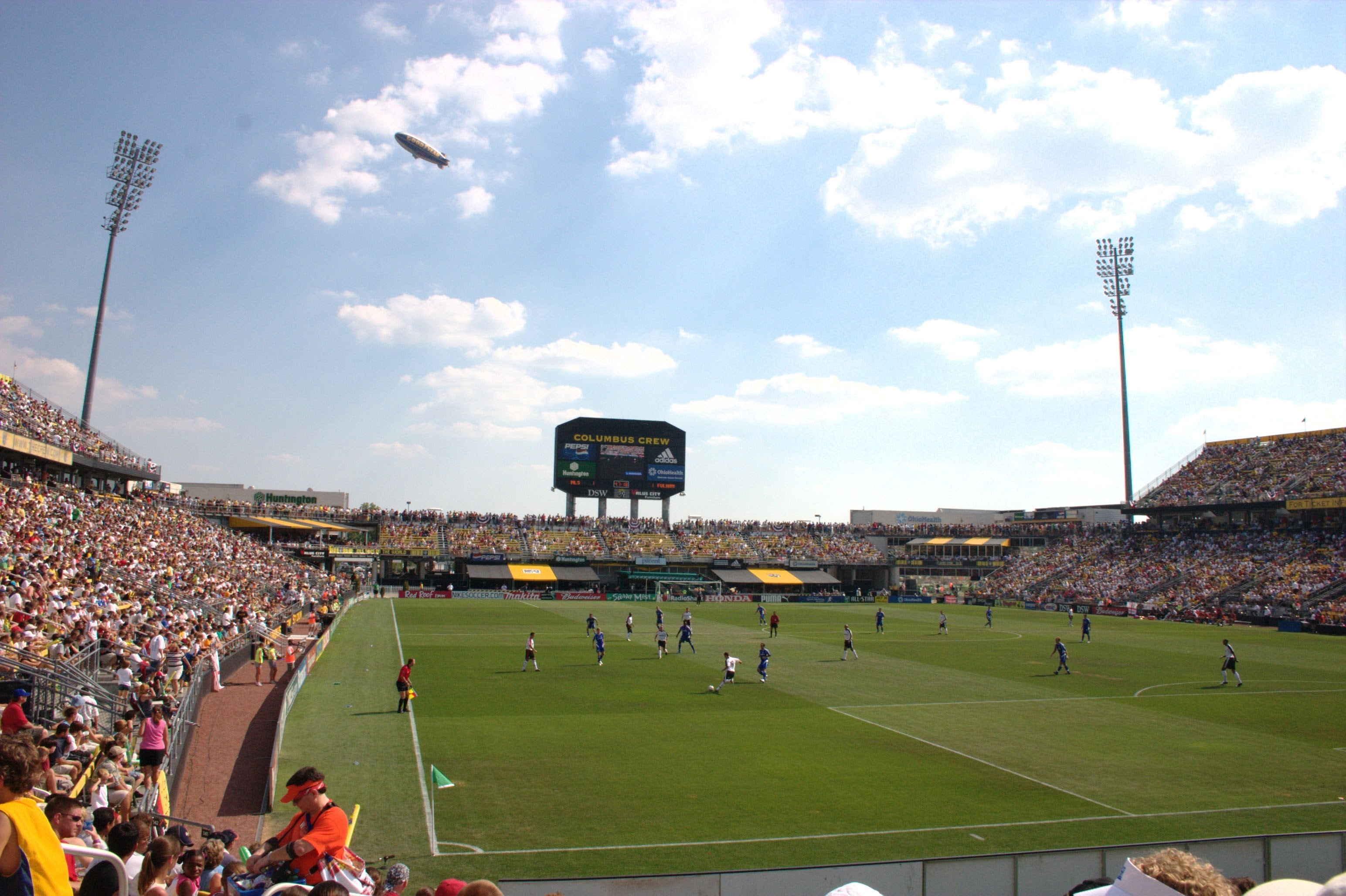
Historic Crew Stadium, the first soccer-specific stadium in the U.S., and former home of Columbus Crew SC

Columbus professional and major NCAA D1 teams
Club	League	Sport	Venue (capacity)	Founded	Titles	Average attendance
Ohio State Buckeyes	NCAA	Football	Ohio Stadium (105,000)	1890	8	105,261
Columbus Crew	MLS	Soccer	ScottsMiracle-Gro Field (20,011)	1996	3	20,314
Columbus NWSL team	NWSL	Soccer	ScottsMiracle-Gro Field (20,011)	2028	0	TBD
Ohio State Buckeyes	NCAA	Basketball	Value City Arena (19,000)	1892	1	16,511
Columbus Blue Jackets	NHL	Ice hockey	Nationwide Arena (18,500)	2000	0	16,237
Columbus Clippers	IL	Baseball	Huntington Park (10,100)	1977	10	9,212

=== Professional sports ===
Columbus is home to teams in two of the five major league professional sports teams (NFL, MLB, NBA, NHL and MLS). The NHL's Columbus Blue Jackets call downtown's Nationwide Arena home, and the MLS' Columbus Crew play in ScottsMiracle-Gro Field in downtown Columbus.

The Columbus area hosts several minor league teams and semi-professional teams. The Columbus Clippers, which are the Cleveland Guardians Triple-A minor league baseball team, play at Huntington Park, which opened in early 2009.

Two semi-professional football teams compete locally: the Columbus Comets of the Women's Professional Football League and the Ohio Swarm of the Mid Continental Football League. Both teams play in Dublin at Coffman High School. Columbus is also the home of Columbus Eagles FC, a women's soccer team who play in Bernlohr Stadium at Capital University.

=== Collegiate sports ===
The Ohio State Buckeyes dominate the sports landscape, with TV's tuned into Buckeye football and men's basketball games during their seasons. Other OSU sports also have a dedicated following, such as OSU baseball, women's basketball, and men's hockey, but football and basketball remain the longtime stalwarts of the Central Ohio sports mindset.

=== Other sports ===
Since 1976, Dublin has been the site of the PGA Tour's Memorial Tournament at the Muirfield Village golf course, designed by Jack Nicklaus. In 1987, the course hosted the Ryder Cup; in 1998 it hosted the Solheim Cup, and in 2013, it hosted the Presidents Cup. The LPGA's Wendy's Championship for Children was held in Columbus from 1999 to 2006.

Rahal Letterman Racing has a home in Hilliard and races in the Indy Racing League. Intersport Racing is located in Dublin and races in the American Le Mans Series. TruSports, owners of the Mid-Ohio Sports Car Course, is found in Dublin as well.

In addition to spectator sports, Columbus has a thriving participant sports spectrum as well. There are approximately 300 golf courses within the Central Ohio area, which is one of the highest ratios of golf courses per capita for a major metropolitan area. There are many on-road and off-road bike trails in the area, with the area being part of the statewide-connected system known as the Ohio to Erie Trail. Skiing facilities exist at Mad River Mountain in Bellefontaine, Ohio, about 40 miles northwest of Dublin, and at Snow Trails near Mansfield, Ohio. Organized baseball and softball leagues are regularly played at Berliner Park in South Columbus, as well as at local fields throughout the area. The Columbus Marathon and Race for the Cure 5K events are held annually in downtown Columbus as well.

The Columbus area is also home to the high school rugby state championships, which features both a boys and girls competition. The 2012 championships drew over 1,500 spectators, and the 2013 championships were broadcast on Time Warner Cable.

== Parks and recreation ==
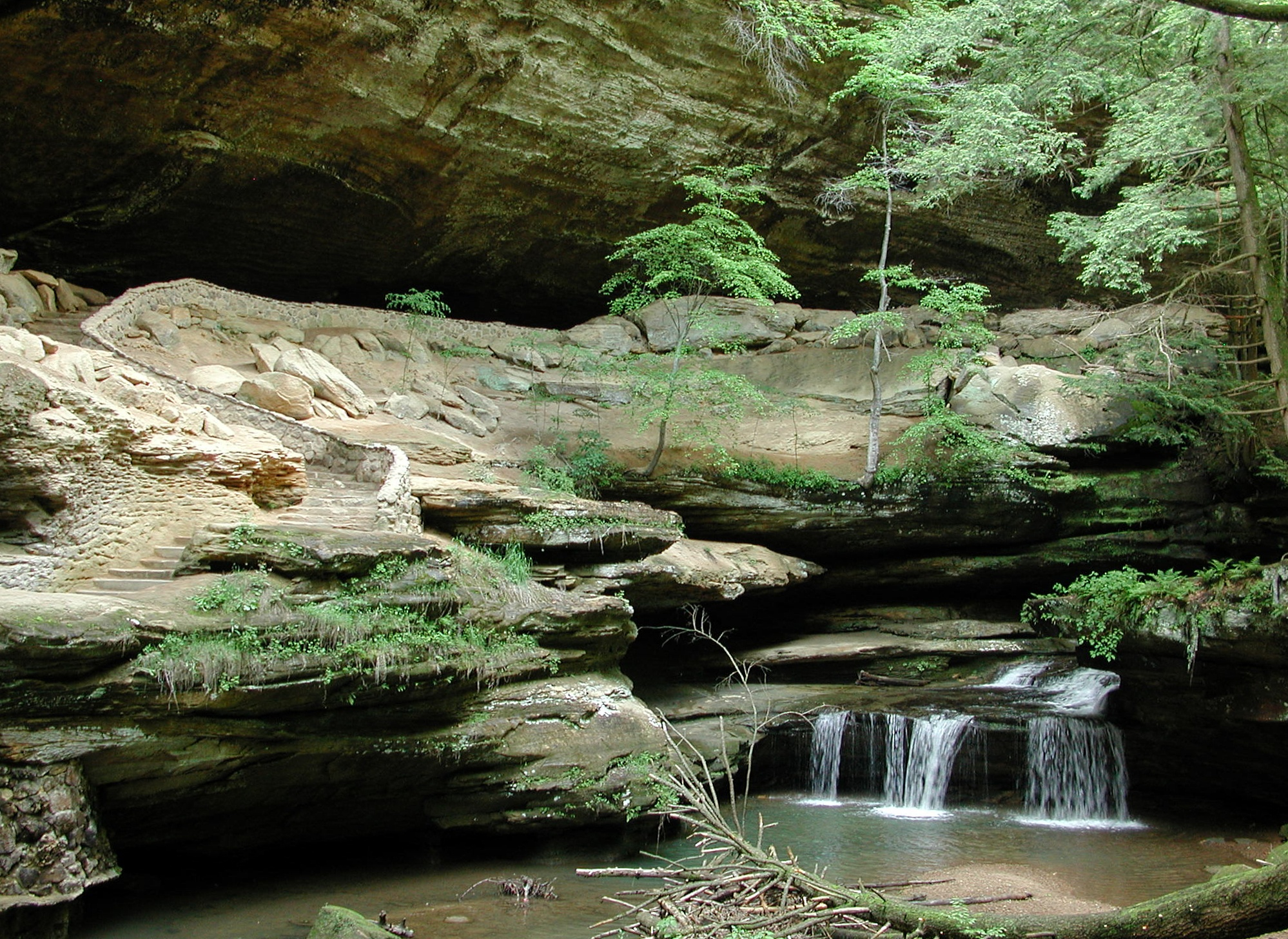
Hocking Hills State Park

In addition to numerous city parks, the Columbus and Franklin County Metro Parks operate 14 large parks mostly focused on preserving and protecting the natural environment. There are many State Parks with unique natural features, including Blackhand Gorge State Nature Preserve, Clifton Gorge State Nature Preserve, Alum Creek State Park, Hocking Hills State Park, and Rockbridge State Nature Preserve. The Hocking Hills region also includes parts of the Wayne National Forest, which makes for good Leaf peeping in the autumn. The Columbus suburb Westerville's Parks and Recreation department has won the National Gold Medal for outstanding parks and recreation in its last two years of eligibility (2001 and 2007).

== Combined statistical area ==
The Columbus–Marion–Zanesville, OH Combined Statistical Area is the second largest CSA in Ohio (behind Cleveland–Akron–Canton, OH). The population of the CSA was 2,544,048 at the 2020 census, 26th largest in the nation. It includes the ten counties in the Columbus MSA, and eight additional single-county micropolitan areas, for a total of eighteen counties.

Statistical Area	2025 estimate	2020 Census	Change	Area	Density
Columbus, OH Metropolitan Statistical Area	2,242,028	2,138,926	+4.82%	4,817 sq mi (12,480 km^{2})	465/sq mi (180/km^{2})
Zanesville, OH Micropolitan Statistical Area	87,014	86,410	+0.70%	673 sq mi (1,740 km^{2})	129/sq mi (50/km^{2})
Chillicothe, OH Micropolitan Statistical Area	76,429	77,093	−0.86%	693 sq mi (1,790 km^{2})	110/sq mi (43/km^{2})
Marion, OH Micropolitan Statistical Area	65,115	65,359	−0.37%	404 sq mi (1,050 km^{2})	161/sq mi (62/km^{2})
Mount Vernon, OH Micropolitan Statistical Area	64,002	62,721	+2.04%	530 sq mi (1,400 km^{2})	121/sq mi (47/km^{2})
Athens, OH Micropolitan Statistical Area	63,197	62,431	+1.23%	508 sq mi (1,320 km^{2})	124/sq mi (48/km^{2})
Bellefontaine, OH Micropolitan Statistical Area	46,302	46,150	+0.33%	467 sq mi (1,210 km^{2})	99/sq mi (38/km^{2})
Cambridge, OH Micropolitan Statistical Area	38,379	38,438	−0.15%	528 sq mi (1,370 km^{2})	73/sq mi (28/km^{2})
Washington Court House, OH Micropolitan Statistical Area	28,552	28,951	−1.38%	407 sq mi (1,050 km^{2})	70/sq mi (27/km^{2})
Total	2,711,018	2,606,479	+4.01%	9,027 sq mi (23,380 km^{2})	300/sq mi (116/km^{2})

== See also ==
- Mid-Ohio Regional Planning Commission
