= Dillon =

Dillon may refer to:

== People ==
- Dillon (surname)
- Dillon (given name)
- Dillon (singer) (born 1988), Brazilian singer
- J. J. Dillon, primary ring name of American professional wrestler James Morrison (born 1942)

== Places ==
=== Canada ===
- Dillon, Saskatchewan

=== United States ===
- Dillon Beach, California
- Dillon, Colorado
- Dillon, Illinois
- Dillon, Kansas
- Dillon, Missouri
- Dillon, Montana
- Dillon, South Carolina
  - Dillon County, South Carolina
- Dillon, Texas
- Dillon, West Virginia
- Dillon Falls, Ohio, also called Dillon
- Dillons Run, a river in West Virginia
- Dillon State Park, on the Licking River, Licking County, Ohio
- Dillon Township (disambiguation)

== Arts and entertainment ==
=== Fictional characters ===
- Al Dillon, in the 1987 film Predator
- Kevin Dillon (character), in the young adult novel Freak the Mighty
- Matt Dillon (Gunsmoke), in the radio and television versions of Gunsmoke
- The Dillon family in the soap opera All My Children:
  - Laurel Banning Dillon
  - Janet Dillon
- Dillon Quartermaine, in the soap opera General Hospital
- Dillon, in the television series Power Rangers RPM
- Dillon, in the video game Dillon's Rolling Western

=== Fictional places ===
- Dillon, Texas, the setting for the NBC television drama Friday Night Lights

== Brands and enterprises ==
- 9x25 Dillon, a wildcat pistol cartridge
- Dillon Aero, a manufacturing company based in Scottsdale, Arizona, United States
- Rhum Dillon, a French rum distilled by Distillerie Dillon in Martinique
- Dillons, an American grocery supermarket chain, part of the Kroger company
- Dillons, a former UK-based chain of bookstores, now part of Waterstones

== Other uses ==
- Viscount Dillon, a title in the Peerage of Ireland
- 78393 Dillon, an asteroid
- Dillon Stadium, Hartford, Connecticut, United States
- Dillon v. Gloss (256 U.S. 368, 1921), a United States Supreme Court case
- Dillon Round of the General Agreement on Tariffs and Trade talks

== See also ==
- Dillian Whyte, a British professional boxer
- Dillion (disambiguation)
- Dillom
- Dylan (disambiguation)
- Dhillon, an Indian surname
