= Dillon Township =

Dillon Township may refer to the following townships:

- Dillon Township, Tazewell County, Illinois
- Dillon Township, Phelps County, Missouri

== See also ==
- Dillon (disambiguation)
