= Dillian =

Dillian is a given name. Notable people with the name include:

- Dillian Gordon (fl. 1972), British art historian and National Gallery curator
- Dillian Whyte (born 1988), British boxer

== See also ==
- Dillion (disambiguation)
- Dillon (disambiguation)
