= Dillon State Park =

Park in Nashport, Ohio, US

Coordinates: 40.007°N 82.105°W

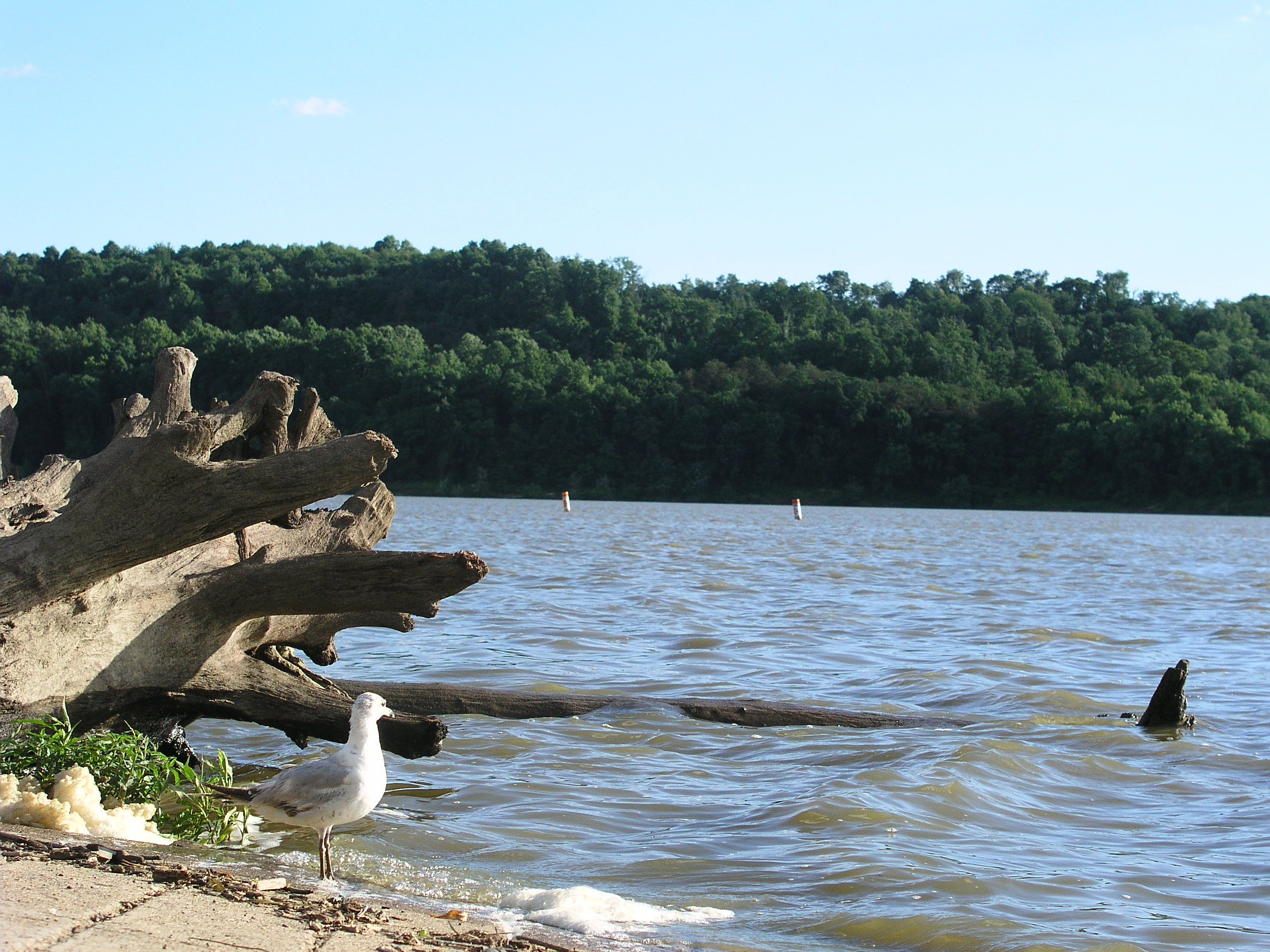
Dillon Reservoir, which the park surrounds

Dillon State Park is a 2,285-acre (9.25 km^{2}) Ohio state park along the Licking River and surrounding Dillon Lake in Nashport, Ohio. The park contains exposures of Black hand sandstone formations and supports a variety of wildlife. Recreational facilities include trails for hiking, biking, and horseback riding, water access for boating and fishing, and campgrounds.

== History ==
Dillon State Park was named after Moses Dillon, who constructed the original Y-Bridge in Zanesville, Ohio. He purchased the land where the park now stands in 1803.

Between 1811 and 1834, the National Road was constructed near the Dillon area. By 1830, the road reached Zanesville, the town adjacent to what later became the park. The road provided a transportation link between central Ohio and eastern markets, contributing to regional economic development.

In 1961, the U.S. Army Corps of Engineers constructed the Dillon Dam as part of a flood control project designed to manage the waters of the Licking and Muskingum Rivers. The resulting reservoir, Dillon Lake, became the center of the state park. Access roads were built following the creation of the lake to accommodate public use.

The park was officially established for public recreation in 1968 by the Ohio Department of Natural Resources.

== Geology ==
The geology of the park includes exposures of Black Hand Sandstone, a member of the Cuyahoga Formation deposited during the Lower Mississippian Period (roughly 350–355 million years ago). This sandstone is coarse-grained and, in places, conglomeratic, with massive beds and cross-bedding visible in outcrops. Sediments forming the unit were derived from upland areas to the east, including the Acadian highlands, and were transported into shallow-marine and deltaic environments. The sandstone is relatively durable and forms prominent cliffs and ridges where exposed.

== Flora and fauna ==
Fish species recorded in the reservoir and tailwaters include Largemouth bass, crappie, channel catfish, bluegill, muskellunge, saugeye, carp, and several sucker species, with 27 species identified in total.

Mammals present in the park include cottontail rabbit, gray and fox squirrels, white-tailed deer, woodchuck, and raccoon. Predators such as red and gray fox, as well as opossum, skunk, beaver, muskrat, and mink are also present.

Birdlife includes waterfowl such as blue-winged teal, mallard, wood duck, northern pintail, wigeon, ring-necked duck, scaup, and Canada geese. Seasonal migrations bring flocks of teal and other ducks to the reservoir.

Vegetation in the park includes hardwood forests dominated by oak and maple. Lichens such as shield lichen are also present.

== Activities and attractions ==
The park provides facilities for hiking, mountain biking, and horseback riding, with trails ranging from 0.5 miles to 18 miles in length. Water-based recreation includes boating, fishing, and swimming at a designated beach. The beach area has restrooms, showers, lockers, a snack bar, and a children’s wading pool.

Sports facilities include courts and fields for tennis, volleyball, basketball, shuffleboard, horseshoes, and paddle ball. A playground is also available.

The campground has 195 campsites and 29 cabins, including equestrian campsites and vacation cabins.
