= Toboso =

Toboso may refer to:

- Toboso people, an indigenous group of Chihuahua
- Toboso, Negros Occidental, a municipality in the Philippines
- El Toboso, a municipality in Castile-La Mancha, Spain
- Toboso, Ohio, unincorporated community in Licking County, Ohio, United States
- Yana Toboso, author of Kuroshitsuji/Black Butler
