= Claylick =

Claylick may refer to:

- Claylick, Pennsylvania, unincorporated community in Pennsylvania, United States
- Claylick, Ohio, former town in Ohio, United States

== See also ==
- Macaw#Diet and clay licks
- Clay lick
