= Dillon Falls =

Dillon Falls may refer to:

- Dillon Falls (Deschutes County, Oregon), on the Deschutes River
- Dillon Falls (Jackson County, Oregon), on the Rogue River
- Dillon Falls, Ohio, an unincorporated community
