= Licking River (Ohio) =

Coordinates: 39.9406°N 82.0146°W

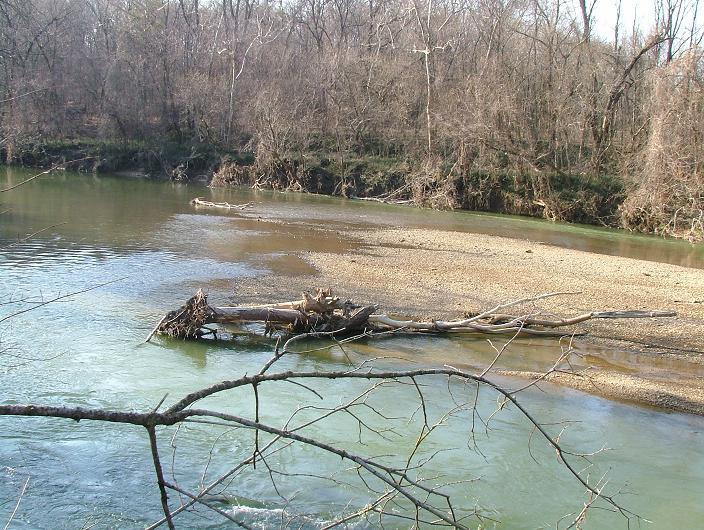
- The Licking River in Black Hand Gorge State Nature Preserve

Location
- Country: United States

Physical characteristics
- Source
  - location: Newark in Licking County
  - elevation: 800 ft (240 m)
- Mouth
  - location: Muskingum River in Zanesville
  - elevation: 680 ft (210 m)
- Basin size: 779 mi^{2} (2,020 km^{2})

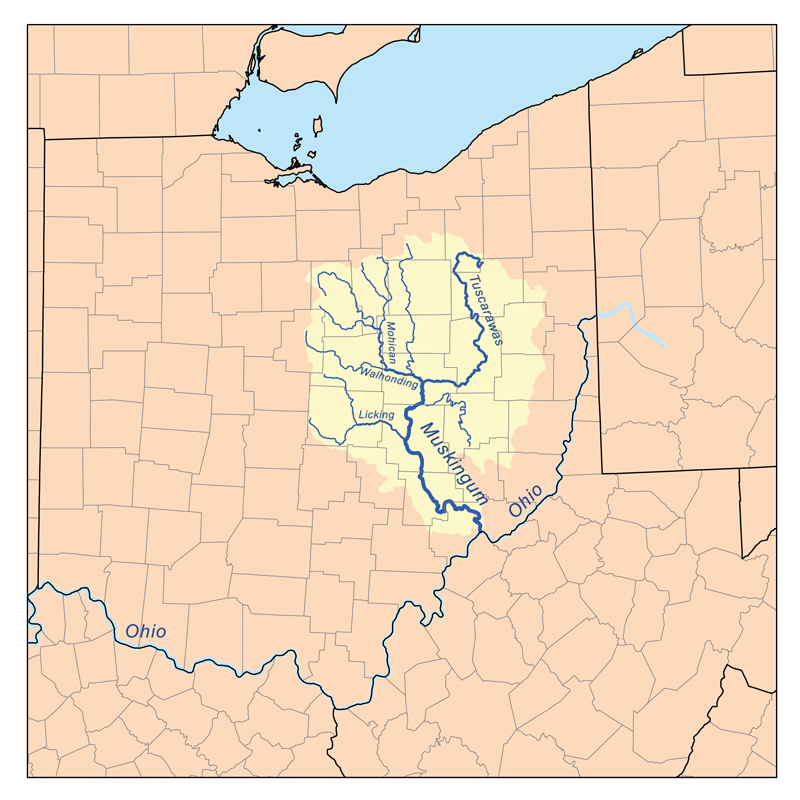
Map of the Muskingum River watershed showing the Licking River

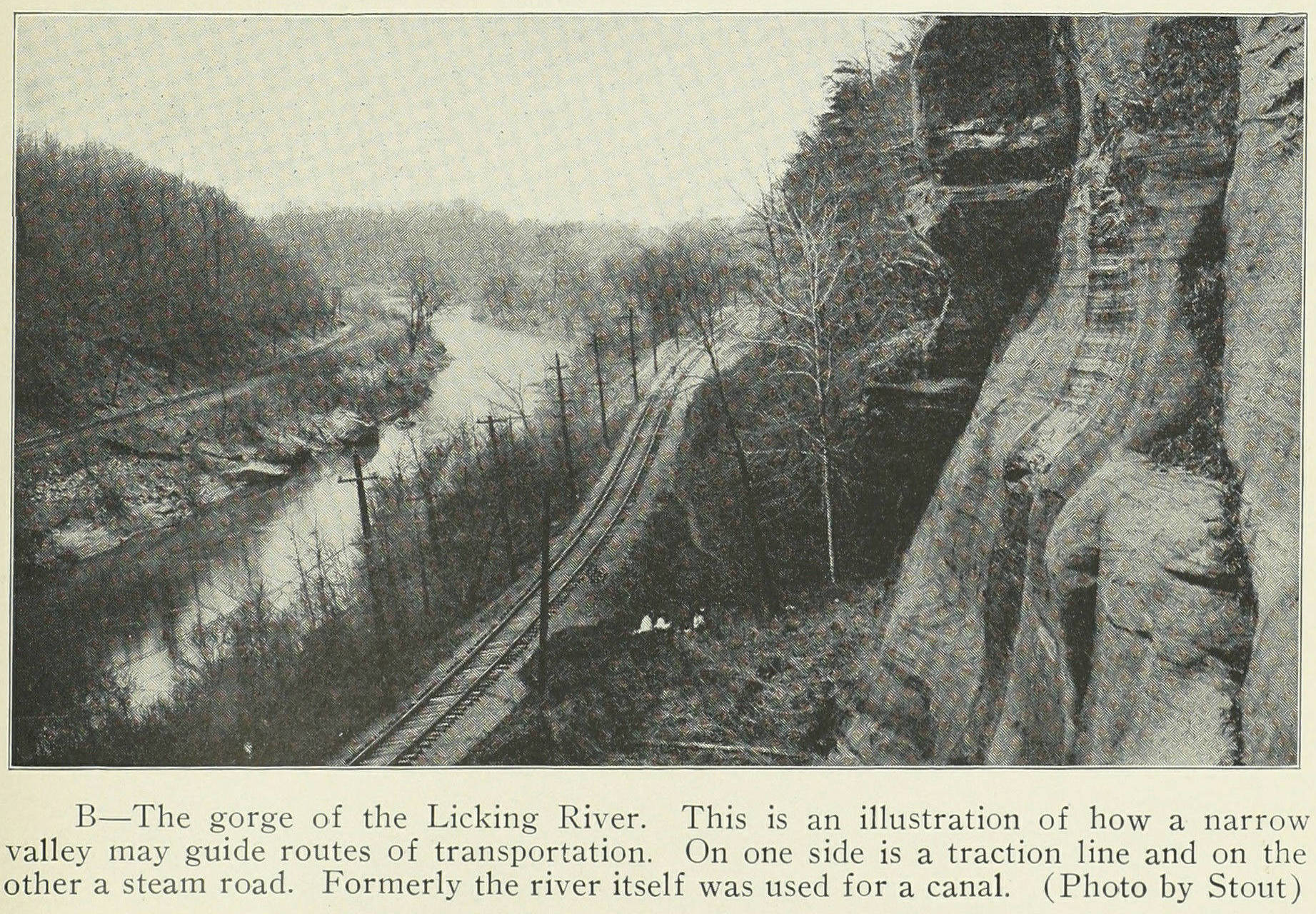
Historic view of the Licking River from "Geography of Ohio," 1923

The Licking River is a tributary of the Muskingum River, about 40 mi (65 km) long, in central Ohio in the United States. Via the Muskingum and Ohio Rivers, it is part of the watershed of the Mississippi River.

== Course ==
The Licking River is formed at Newark in Licking County by the confluence of its north and south forks including many other small fishable streams.

- The North Fork Licking River, about 35 mi (55 km) long, rises in southwestern Morrow County and initially flows generally east-southeastwardly through Knox County, past Centerburg, into Licking County, where at Utica it turns southwardly and flows past St. Louisville. In Licking County, the North Fork collects the Otter Fork Licking River, which rises in Knox County and flows past Hartford; the Lake Fork Licking River; and the Clear Fork Licking River. The Lake and Clear forks both flow for their entire lengths in Licking County.
- The South Fork Licking River, about 30 mi (50 km) long, rises in southwestern Licking County and initially flows southeastwardly past Pataskala and Kirkersville and briefly enters Fairfield County, where it turns northeastwardly back into Licking County and flows past Heath.

From Newark, the Licking River flows generally eastwardly through the Black Hand Gorge State Nature Preserve into Muskingum County, where it turns southeastwardly. It joins the Muskingum River at Zanesville; the confluence of the two rivers is spanned by a Y-shaped bridge.

Upstream of Zanesville, a U.S. Army Corps of Engineers dam causes the river to form Dillon Lake, along which Dillon State Park is located.

== Flow rate ==
River	Location	Time period	Annual mean discharge
North Fork Licking River	USGS stream gauge in Newark	Water years 2011-2019	324.3 cu ft/s (9.18 m^{3}/s)
South Fork Licking River	USGS stream gauge in Heath	Water years 2011-2019	263.9 cu ft/s (7.47 m^{3}/s)
Raccoon Creek (tributary of South Fork)	USGS stream gauge in Newark	Water years 2011-2019	166.1 cu ft/s (4.70 m^{3}/s)
Licking River	USGS stream gauge near Dillon Falls	Water years 1985-1991	922.2 cu ft/s (26.11 m^{3}/s)
Licking River	mouth (Zanesville)		976.9 cu ft/s (27.66 m^{3}/s) (estimate)

== Johnny Appleseed ==
Jonathan Chapman (1775-1843), aka Johnny Appleseed, planted his first apple orchard near Licking Creek. He took a load of apple seed from Pennsylvania cider presses into the Territory of Ohio in 1801, according to a Harper magazine article written in November 1871, "Johnny Appleseed - A Pioneer Hero" by W.D. Haley (pp. 830–836).

== Variant names ==
According to the Geographic Names Information System, the Licking River has also been known as:

- Licking Creek
- Nepepenime Sepe
- Pataskala Creek
- Pataskala River
- Salt Lick Creek

== See also ==
- List of rivers of Ohio
