= Dylan =

Dylan may refer to:

== Arts and entertainment ==
- Bob Dylan (born 1941), American singer and songwriter
  - Dylan (1973 album), a 1973 album by Bob Dylan
  - Dylan (2007 album), a 2007 compilation album by Bob Dylan
- Dylan (musician), professional name of English singer-songwriter Natasha Woods
- Dylan (play), a 1964 play by Sidney Michael about Dylan Thomas

== Technology and engineering ==
- Dylan (programming language), a language with Lisp-like semantics and ALGOL-like syntax
- Dylan, a RAID storage system by Quantel
- Honda Dylan, a high-end 125cc Honda scooter in Vietnam

== Other uses ==
- Dylan (name), a given name of Welsh origin and a family name (including a list of persons with the name)
- Dylan ail Don, a sea-god in Welsh mythology

== See also ==
- Dilan (disambiguation)
- Dillon (disambiguation)
- Dilyn, a dog
- Dilyn (drug), an expectorant
