= Dillon Township, Tazewell County, Illinois =

Coordinates: 40°26′16″N 89°32′19″W

Dillon Township
- Township
- Location in Tazewell County
- Country: United States
- State: Illinois
- County: Tazewell
- Established: November 6, 1849

Area
  - Total: 35.93 sq mi (93.1 km^{2})
  - Land: 35.93 sq mi (93.1 km^{2})
  - Water: 0 sq mi (0 km^{2}) 0%

Population (2010)
  - Estimate (2016): 981
  - Density: 27.8/sq mi (10.7/km^{2})
- Time zone: UTC-6 (CST)
  - Summer (DST): UTC-5 (CDT)
- FIPS code: 17-179-19941

Dillon Township is located in Tazewell County, Illinois. As of the 2010 census, its population was 1,000 and it contained 382 housing units.

The unincorporated community of Dillon is located within the township.

== Geography ==
According to the 2010 census, the township has a total area of 35.93 square miles (93.1 km^{2}), all land.

== Demographics ==
Historical population
Census	Pop.	Note	%±
2016 (est.)	981
U.S. Decennial Census

The Dillon township consists of 99.81% whites, with the remaining population consisting for two or more races.
