= Dillon Township, Phelps County, Missouri =

Township in Missouri

Coordinates: 37.9614°N 91.6972°W

Dillon Township is an inactive township in Phelps County, in the U.S. state of Missouri.

Dillon Township has the name of John A. Dillon, a pioneer citizen who was active in local politics.
