= Shield lichen =

Shield lichen is the common name for lichens in either the genus Heterodermia or genus Parmelia.
