= Dilan Ağgül =

German-born Turkish footballer

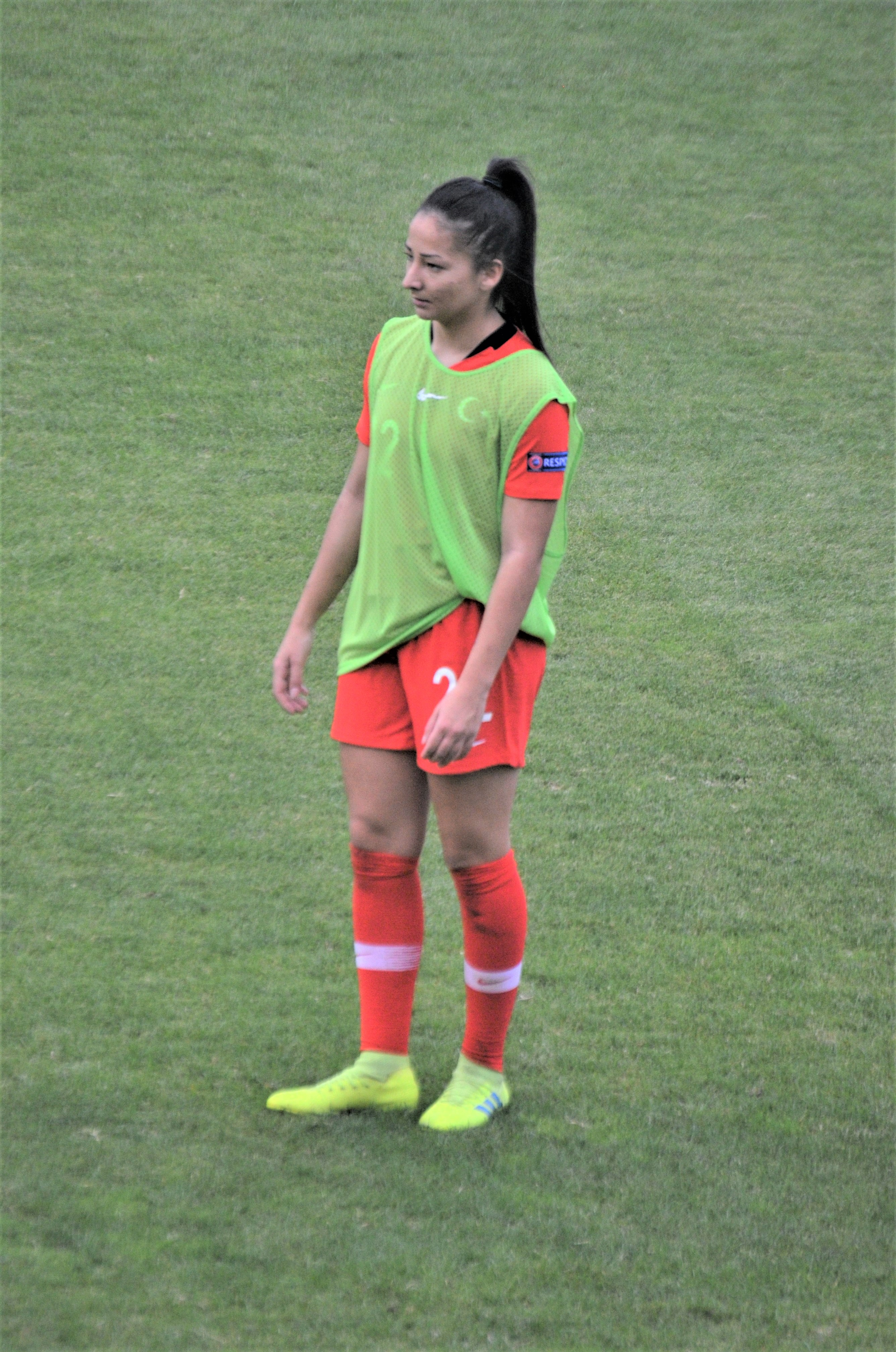
- Ağgül with the Turkey national team in 2019

Personal information
- Date of birth: 3 August 1998 (age 28)
- Place of birth: Traunstein, Upper Bavaria, Germany
- Position: Midfielder

Team information
- Current team: FSV Gütersloh 2009
- Number: 23

Senior career*
Years	Team	Apps	(Gls)
2014	DJK Traunstein	2	(0)
2015	SC Vachendorf	0	(0)
2015–2018	SV Saaldorf	58	(2)
2018–2019	Bayer 04 Leverkusen II	19	(8)
2019–	FSV Gütersloh 2009	5	(1)

International career^{‡}
2018–2019	Turkey	3	(0)
- * Club domestic league appearances and goals ‡ National team caps and goals as of 11 November 2019

Dilan Ağgül (born 3 August 1998) is a German-born Turkish footballer who plays as a midfielder for 2. Frauen-Bundesliga club FSV Gütersloh 2009 and the Turkey national team.

== Personal life ==
Dilan Ağgül was born in Traunstein, Upper Bavaria, Germany on 3 August 1998. Her brother, Diyar, is one year older. After completing her Fachabitur (specialized university entrance qualification), she started a distance education program for nutritional science. She grew up with her parents in Traunstein. She has the exclusive citizenship of Turkey.

== Club career ==
Inspired by her brother, who played football, Ağgül also started playing football at the age of five. She entered DJK Traunstein in her hometown in the 2014–15 season, which competed in the 6th-level German League of Bezirksoberliga Bayern (District Upper League of Bavaria), where she collected two caps. After her team was folded, she moved to SC Vachendorf again as junior player. In the 2015–16 season, she went to SV Saaldorf, where she enjoyed her team's promotion to the fourth-level league of Bayernliga (Bavaria Women's League) in her first year. She was capped 58 times and scored two goals in three seasons. In the 2018–19 season at the age of 19, she moved to the U-23 team Bayer 04 Leverkusen II, which compete in the Frauen-Mittelrheinliga (Women's League of the Middle Rhine). As of 1 April 2019, she has played 10 games and has scored four goals. In the 2019–20 season, she joined FSV Gütersloh 2009 to play in the 2. Frauen-Bundesliga. The next season, she appears in the 2. BL Nord.

== International career ==
Ağgül was called up to the Turkey national team, and debuted in a friendly match against Georgia held in Tbilisi on 11 November 2018. She played in one of the UEFA European Championship 2021 qualifying Group A matches against Netherlands.
