= Dilan Woutersz =

Sri Lankan cricketer (born 1977)

Dilan Woutersz (born 20 October 1977) is a Sri Lankan former cricketer. He was a right-handed batsman and right-arm medium-fast bowler who played for Nondescripts Cricket Club. He was born in Colombo.

Woutersz made a single first-class appearance for the team, during the 1999–2000 season, against Singha. He did not bat for the team, but bowled 12 overs, taking match figures of 0–42.
