= Dillan Ismail =

Swedish footballer

Personal information
- Date of birth: 2 April 1992 (age 34)
- Place of birth: Uppsala, Sweden
- Height: 1.82 m (6 ft 0 in)
- Position: Centre back

Team information
- Current team: Gefle IF
- Number: 5

Youth career
- Unik FK
- Uppsala-Näs IK
- 2007–2010: IK Sirius

Senior career*
Years	Team	Apps	(Gls)
2010–2011	IK Sirius	5	(1)
2011	→ GUSK (loan)		
2012–2013	Enköpings SK	18	(1)
2013–2019	Umeå FC	141	(19)
2019	Dalkurd FF	28	(1)
2020	Umeå FC	0	(0)
2021	Dalkurd FF	25	(7)
2022	Arlanda	20	(2)
2023–2024	Gamla Upsala	18	(4)
2025	IFK Haninge	7	(1)
2026–	Gefle IF	27	(2)
- * Club domestic league appearances and goals as of 16 November 2026

Dillan Ismail (born 2 April 1992) is a Swedish footballer who plays as a centre back for Gefle IF.

== Career ==
Playing six season with Umeå FC, he left for Dalkurd FF in 2019. After a good season with Dalkurd, he returned to Umeå in March 2020.

== Personal life ==
Dillan Ismail is of Kurdish and Bosnian origins, born in Uppsala. Aside from being a footballer, Dillan Ismail also works as a doctor.
