= City Barbeque =

American restaurant chain

Restaurant information
- Established: 1999; 27 years ago
- Food type: Barbeque restaurant
- Dress code: casual
- Website: www.citybbq.com

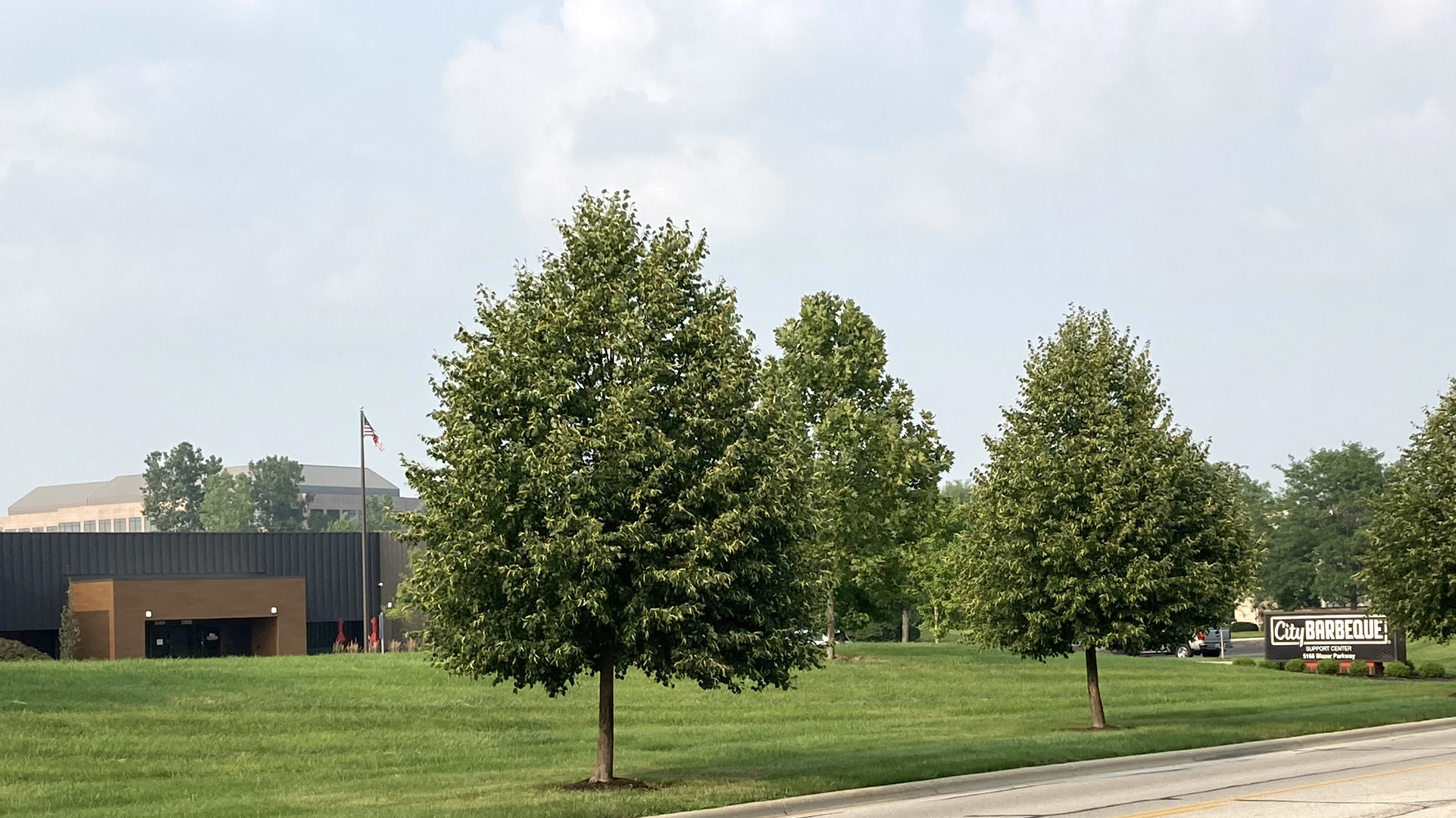
Company headquarters

City Barbeque is a fast-casual barbeque chain founded in Columbus, Ohio, in 1999 by founder Rick Malir and his wife, Bonnie Coley-Malir. City Barbeque has over 70 company-owned restaurants across ten states and is headquartered in Dublin, Ohio. Mike Muldoon currently serves as the company's CEO.

== History ==
The first City Barbeque location opened in a former doughnut shop in Upper Arlington, Ohio (located at 2111 W Henderson Road, Columbus, Ohio, and still in operation as of 2025). A number of delays pushed back the opening of that first location, so Founder Rick Malir started fulfilling catering orders out of his home to sustain the business while waiting for the restaurant to be ready.

== Menu ==
City Barbeque serves beef brisket, pulled pork, turkey breast, pulled chicken with 'Bama sauce, smoked sausage, bone-in chicken, and St. Louis–cut ribs and a variety of crafted sandwiches; all meats are smoked in on-site smokers at each location. Sides include fries, green beans with bacon, mac & cheese, coleslaw, corn pudding, hush puppies, cornbread, collards with pork, potato salad, side salads, and baked beans with brisket. The menu also includes shareables, salads, samplers, and three desserts: peach cobbler, banana pudding, and triple chocolate cake. They often have a rotating limited time offering on the menu as well.

== Awards ==
City Barbeque's food has been recognized by the Kansas City Barbeque Society (American Royal Invitational World Champion Brisket), Restaurant Hospitality magazine ("More Cowbell", which the publication named one of the country's best sandwiches), the National Turkey Federation (Turkey on the Menu, Fast Casual category), Cooking with Paula Deen (Ten to Try: Banana Pudding), and more. The restaurant itself has been named the top barbeque restaurant in Columbus by Business Insider in 2012, one of the top 25 barbeque spots in the country by Men's Journal in 2014, and the country's second best barbeque chain by The Daily Meal in 2017. In 2018, City Barbeque was named to QSR's 40/40 list; in 2017, it held the #48 spot on Restaurant Business's Future 50. 2023 brought a win in the Nation's Restaurant News Barbeque Showdown when City Barbeque was voted the winner by readers in a competition featuring top barbecue brands across the nation.

City Barbeque's business has received recognition as well. The company has been named best employer (under 500 employees) in Columbus, Ohio from 2016 to 2018. In 2018, City Barbeque founder Rick Malir received a Smart 50 Award, awarded by Smart Business Columbus to "recognize the top executives of the 50 smartest companies in the region for their ability to effectively build and lead successful organizations". City Barbeque received a Pillar Award for Community Service—a recognition honoring "organizations that set the standard for outstanding service to their communities"—in 2019. Also in 2019, TDn2K named City Barbeque the Best Practices Award recipient for the fast-casual category, a recognition of "consistently superior performance and results among the hundreds of companies tracked by People Report".
