= Black hand sandstone =

Black Hand Sandstone is a multistory, crossbedded, coarse-grained conglomeratic sandstone within the Cuyahoga Formation in Ohio.
