= Şehnaz Dilan =

Turkish actress (born 1960)

- Born: Şehnaz Vreskala; August 27, 1960 (age 65); İzmir, Turkey
- Occupations: Footballer, model, actress, singer

Şehnaz Dilan (born Şehnaz Vreskala; August 27, 1960) is a Turkish model, actress, singer and former footballer.

== Private life ==
Şehna Dilan was born as Şehnaz Vreskala to an Albanian immigrant family from former Yugoslavia in İzmir, Turkey on August 27, 1960.

In 2000, she gave birth to a daughter.

== Career ==
=== Footballer ===
Inspired by her uncle, who was the regional director in İzmir for football, Dilan began football playing in 1979. She was a member of Filizspor in her hometown, and she became the captain of her team, leading them to a championship title in 1981. Her football career lasted until the end of 1983 when her mother died. She did football training four hours a day. During this time, she performed also other sports like swimming, volleyball and took part at cycling races, but she liked football most.

=== Model ===
After her mother's death, she went to Istanbul, where she was raised by her aunt. She began to appear in advertising and runway shows. As she was a former football player, she had a muscular body, which was effective for the selection of her as a mannequin. Dilan also posed for erotic photography in popular Turkish men's magazines like Erkekçe, Peri and Bravo in the 1980s.

=== Actress ===
She entered cinema for a role in the move Kızlar Sınıfı ("Girls' Class"). She left modelling and made five more films with İlyas Salman. Her family was against her acting in movies. However, she was very enthusiastic, and she divorced her husband to continue with the job of acting in films. Dilan starred with Şener Şen in the movie Âşık Oldum ("I Fell in Love") (1985) by Ertem Eğilmez, an adaptation of Woman in Red. Her next film, she played a leading role in, was with Kemal Sunal in Yoksul ("The Poor") (1986) by Zeki Ökten. Then, she appeared in the movie Gömlek’ ("The Shirt") by Bilge Olgaç. For her role in Eskici ve Oğulları ("The Used-good Dealer and His Sons") by Şahin Gök, she was honored. Dilan left the film set of addam’ın Askerleri ("The Soldiers of Saddam") by Gani Rüzgar Şavata and gave up because she could not stand the killing of a horse. She returned to the cinema with a role in Yağmurlu Gecede Gülperi by Oğuz Gözen.

=== Singer ===
After her divorce, she played in the television serials with the singers İbrahim Tatlıses, Oya Aydoğan and Müslüm Gürses in 1993. She appeared as a singer on the stage in a night club. Later, she worked as a soloist in luxury hotels.

== Filmography ==
2011

- Aşkın Bela Halleri

2008

- Zırtık Mafya) (TV serial)
- Saddam'ın Askerleri: Kara Güneş
- Ramazanda Gözyaşları (TV film)
- Kırık Hayatlar

2007

- Çile (TV film)
- Memleket Hikayeleri - Ne Sen Beni Unut Ne De Ben Seni (TV film)
- Kan Damlaları (TV film)
- Demokrasi İçin (TV film)

2006

- Memleket Hikayeleri: Evlerinin Önü Mersin (TV film)

2005

- Profesyonel Çaylaklar (TV film)
- Anne ya da Leyla

2004

- Türkü Filmi (TV serial)

2003

- Yeşilçam Denizi (Tv program)
- Evlat (TV film)i

2002

- Sensiz Yaşanmaz
- Kenar Mahalle
- Dumanlı Yol (TV serial)

2001

- Dönüşü Olmayan Yol (Video)

2000

- Zehirli Çiçek (TV serial)
- Karlar Eriyince
- Geç Gelen Bayram (TV serial)
- Barbunya Nuri (TV film)

1998

- Ozan

1997

- Şakir Tamkeriz
- Yürek Yarası
- Sevimli Dostlar (TV film)
- Bizim Mesele

1996

- Çapraz Ateş
- Kumarcılar

1995

- Şüphenin Bedeli
- Özlem, Düne... Bugüne... Yarına
- Çiçek Taksi (TV serial - guest actress)
- Yasak Aşk
- Yaman Gazeteci
- Yalnızlık Duygusu
- Rambo Ramiz
- Issızlığın Ortasında (TV film)
- Afilli Kemal

1994

- Ölümden Acı
- Tomurcuk
- Oy Deposu
- Kızlar Sınıfı (TV serial)
- Kaygısızlar (TVserial)
- Hangimiz Eşek (TV serial)
- Göz Hapsi
- Gitme Kal
- Düşünce
- Düşler De Ölür

1993

- İçimizdeki Sevgi
- İntizar
- Çifte Vakkas (TV film)
- Ufukta Bir Ağaç
- Oğlum Ve Ben
- Komşular (TV serial)
- Hayat Kavgası
- Dur Gitme
- Aldanış
- Ödeşme
- Silahların Gölgesinde Aşk

1992

- Pötürgeli Hasan (Video)
- Nehirler Denize Akar
- Kurdoğlu-2 / Sancağın Ordusu (TV serial)
- Kurdoğlu 3 / Bu Yola Baş Koyduk
- Günlerden Pazar
- Buhranlı Günler

1991

- Ecelin Gölgesinde

1990

- Zavallı
- Güneşi Göremeden
- Eskici Ve Oğulları
- Acılar İçinde

1989

- Şah Mat
- İtirazım Var
- Hemşire Ayça

1988

- Talihsiz Yavrum
- Stres
- Sevgilerin En Güzeli (Video)
- Seninle İlk Defa
- Gömlek
- Acı

1987

- Şoför Parçası
- Yağmur Damlaları
- Yoksul

1986

- Yoksul
- Vazife Uğruna
- Umut Sokağı
- Sızı (TV serial)
- Seviyorum
- Oğlum Oğlum
- Mavi Muammer 3 / Ölürsün Gülmekten (Video)
- Ben Milyoner Değilim
- Beleşçiler

1985

- Yaşamak Haram Oldu
- Tele Kızlar
- Sensiz Yaşayamam
- Onlar Da Sevdiler
- Mavi Muammer 2 / Silahtan Ödüm Patlar (Video)
- Mavi Muammer (Video)
- Dönme Sevgilim
- Aşık Oldum

1984

- Sevmek Yeniden Doğmak
- Kızlar Sınıfı
- Batak

1983

- Yorgun

1981

- Tövbe

1980

- Vurun Beni Öldürün
- Senin Olmaya Geldim
