= Dilan Jayawardane =

Sri Lankan engineer

- Born: Sri Lanka
- Education: Nalanda College Colombo, University of Moratuwa, Massachusetts Institute of Technology
- Occupation: Engineer
- Employer: Google
- Known for: Co-founder of Scoopler

Dilan Jayawardane is a Sri Lankan engineer who co-founded Scoopler based in the United States.

== Early life ==
Jayawardane having received his education from Nalanda College, Colombo, gained admission to enter Moratuwa University and later won a MIT scholarship entering the Massachusetts Institute of Technology in 2002. There he studied engineering and science, graduating with a degree in Electrical Engineering and Computer science in 2006.

== Later life ==
After graduation Jayawardane joined Oracle Corporation in San Francisco Californica as an engineer in Relational database management system (RDMBS) research team. He later quit Oracle and moved to United Kingdom and with one of his University of Oxford graduate colleagues started up their own company called Scoopler Inc, and started developing a search engine. In 2008 he was chosen to participate in a seed-funding program by Y Combinator. In 2009 they invented Scoopler, a search engine that redefined internet searches worldwide. In 2011 Scoopler was acquired by Google and Jayawardane joined Google, working on its Google X project, as a project manager. He was also a key developer for Google's Google+ social network and Space elevator project.
