= Lane Avenue Bridge =

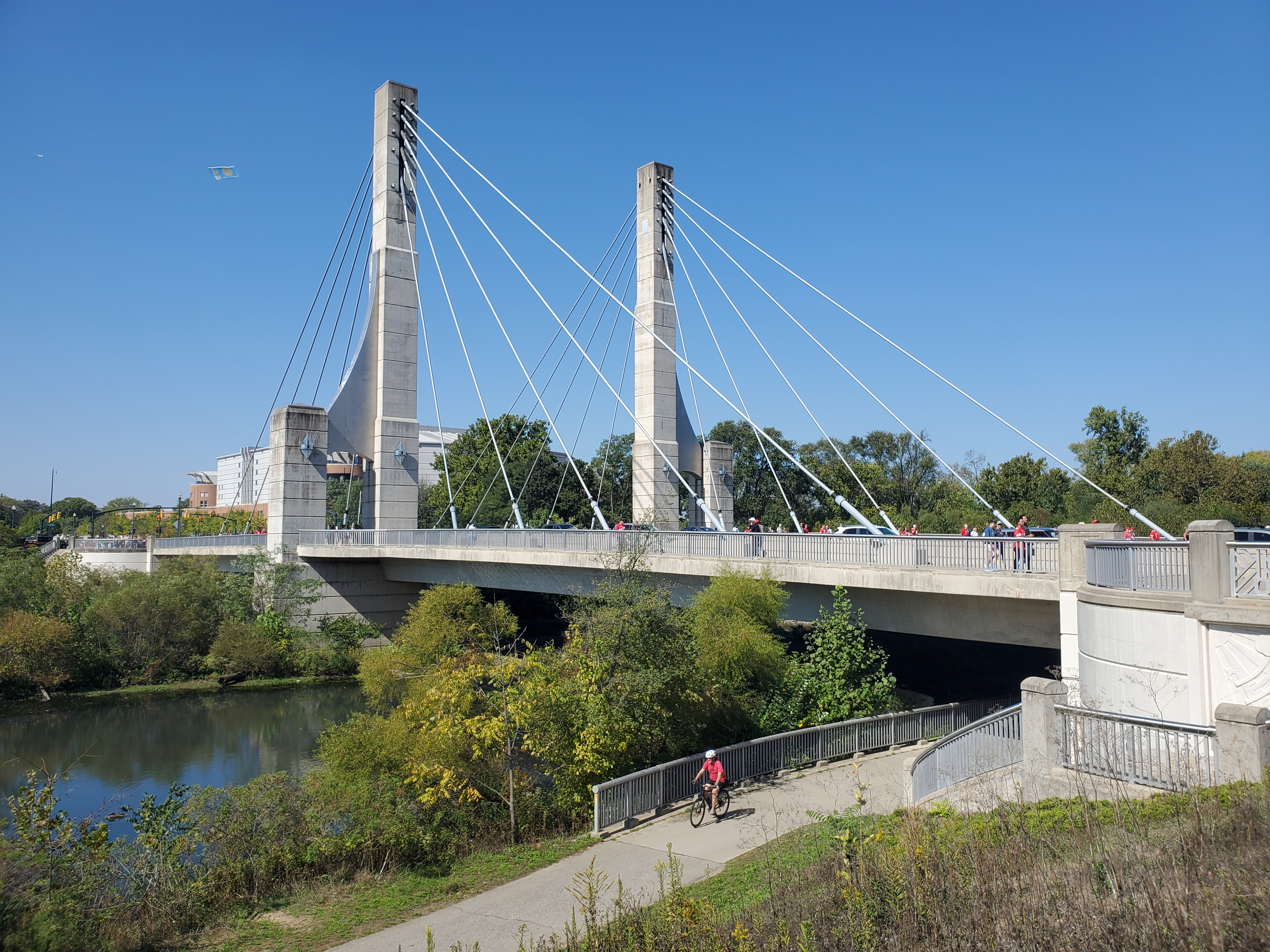
- Lane Avenue Bridge in October 2024
- Coordinates: 40.006500°N 83.02200°W
- Carries: Lane Avenue
- Crosses: Olentangy River
- Locale: Columbus, Ohio, USA
- Maintained by: Franklin County Engineer

Characteristics
- Design: Cable stayed
- Total length: 370 ft (113 m)
- Piers in water: 1
- No. of lanes: 4 westbound, 2 eastbound

History
- Designer: Jones-Stuckey Ltd., Civil Engineering Firm, Columbus, Ohio
- Construction start: 2002
- Construction end: 2003
- Opened: November 14, 2003

Location
- Interactive map outlining the Lane Avenue Bridge

The Lane Avenue Bridge is a cable-stayed bridge over the Olentangy River in the American city of Columbus, Ohio. Designed by Jones-Stuckey Ltd., the construction was completed on November 14, 2003. The bridge is 113 meters (371 feet) in length, carrying six 3.5 meters (11 feet) wide lanes for vehicle traffic, as well as two 3.5 meter sidewalks. The cable stayed design was chosen for aesthetic reasons, as well as having a smaller potential for environmental degradation on the river environment. The anchorages for the cables, at 47 tons (104,000 lbs), are noted as being the heaviest single pieces of steel ever to be galvanized. Total price for the project was US$15.6 million with the following funding sources:

- $5 million from the Ohio Public Works Commission
- $5 million from the Federal Highway Administration
- $3.2 million from the Franklin County Engineer's Office
- $2.4 million from the City of Columbus

Previously, traffic on Lane Avenue was carried by a three-lane earth-filled arch bridge, which opened in 1919. By 1998, it was determined that the bridge was deteriorating; thus a replacement was needed. Construction on the new bridge started on February 27, 2002, with the old bridge being demolished on November 25 of the same year, after the final home football game at Ohio Stadium, nearby.
