= Park National Bank (Ohio) =

Bank based in Columbus, Ohio

- Type: Subsidiary
- Industry: Banking
- Founded: 1908
- Area served: Ohio; Kentucky; North Carolina; South Carolina; |Tennessee}}
- Net income: $148.4 million (2023)
- AUM: $9.9 billion (2023)
- Parent: Park National Corporation
- Website: www.parknationalbank.com

Park National Corporation
- Traded as: AMEX: PRK; Russell 2000 component; S&P 600 component
- Founded: 1908

The Park National Bank is the lead bank in the $9.9 billion Park National Corporation serving Ohio, Northern Kentucky, and the Carolinas. The bank has three affiliate financial institutions, including Guardian Finance Company, Scope Aircraft Leasing, and SE Property Holdings, LLC. Park National Bank is headquartered in Newark, Ohio.

== History ==
Park National Bank was founded in July 1908 under the name The Park National Bank of Newark. The organization changed its name to Park National Bank in 1971 shortly after acquiring The People's State Bank. The company then acquired The Utica Savings Bank Company in 1973, followed by The Fairfield National Bank of Lancaster.

During the housing crisis of the early 2000s, Park National acquired nine other banks in a three year period. Most of these acquisitions happened within the 2008 fiscal year, which was the peak of the crisis. The company managed to acquire seven different banks in 2008. The next acquisition for the corporation was NewDominion Bank, which brought Park National into the North Carolina area. One of their affiliates has also recently announced plans to build a location in Kentucky.

Carolina Alliance Bank was the latest bank to join the organization expanding the region into South Carolina. The Park National Family of Banks is now operating in 28 counties in Ohio, one in Kentucky, one in North Carolina, and two in South Carolina. There are 110 branches located in Ohio.

At the beginning of 2020, Park National Bank changed the names of all affiliate banks to Park National Bank. Chairman and CEO, David Trautman, reported that unifying the various affiliates under one name allows for 'smart, steady growth, with expanded resources to better serve the customers'. Services and employees did not change, however a new, more modern, logo was chosen using colors from some of the affiliate bank's brands.

== Affiliates - Now consolidated under the Park National Bank name ==
=== Fairfield National Bank ===
This affiliate started with the acquisition of The Fairfield National Bank of Lancaster in 1985. Fairfield National has nine branches, the main branch is in downtown Lancaster. They have locations in Lancaster, Baltimore, Pickerington, and Canal Winchester. The president of this division is Laura Tussing.

=== Park National Bank: Southwest Ohio and Northern Kentucky ===
This affiliate started with the acquisition of First Clermont Bank and Anderson Bank Company in 2005. Park National Bank Southwest Ohio & Northern Kentucky has eight branches; with Eastgate being classified as the main branch. They have locations in Milford, West Chester, Owensville, New Richmond, Eastgate, Ohio pike, Rookwood, and Anderson. The president of this division is Dave Gooch who started off with the company in Newark, Ohio (Park National Bank division). Park National Bank Southwest Ohio and Northern Kentucky is currently expanding with plans of adding a new branch in Louisville Kentucky.

=== United Bank ===
This affiliate started with the acquisition of United Bank, National Association in 2008. United Bank has six branches, the main branch is in Bucyrus. They have locations in Bucyrus, Galion, Caledonia, and Crestline. The president of this division is Donald Stone, who doubles as a commercial lender as well.

=== First-Knox National Bank ===
This affiliate started with the acquisition of First-Knox National Bank in 2008. First-Knox National has 13 branches, the main branch is in Mount Vernon. They have locations in three of which are located in Mount Vernon, Fredericktown, Loudonville (originally Farmers and Savings Bank), Millersburg, Centerburg, Mount Gilead, and Danville. The president of the First Knox division is Bob Boss. The main branch is located in Mount Vernon on Public Square and South Main street. "Home - First Knox National Bank". First Knox National Bank.

=== Richland Bank ===
This affiliate started with the acquisition of The Richland Trust Company in 2008. Richland has ten branches, the main branch is in Mansfield. They have locations in Mansfield, Ontario, Lexington, and Shelby. The president of this division is Chris Hiner who is one half of their executive team. The other member of the executive team is Frank Wagner who is the executive vice president and a commercial lender.

=== Second National Bank ===
This affiliate started with the acquisition of Second National Bank in 2008. Second National has six branches, the main branch is in Greenville. They have locations in Greenville, Versailles, and Ft. Recovery. The president of this division is John Swallow who started with the organization in Newark, Ohio.

=== Security National Bank ===
This affiliate started with the acquisition of The Security National Bank and Trust Company in 2001. Security National has eighteen branches, the main branch is in Downtown Springfield. They have locations in Champaign, Clark, and Greene Counties. The president of this division is John Brown. This affiliate has the most branches out of every division that isn't including the main company Park National Bank.

=== Unity National Bank ===
This affiliate started off with the bank investing in Citizens National Bank of Urbana in 2008. Unity National has six branches, the main branch is in Piqua. They have locations in Piqua, Troy, and Tipp City. The president of this division of this division is Scott Rasor. Unity is the smallest affiliate that the Park National Family of Banks has.

=== Century National Bank ===
This affiliate started off with the acquisition of Century National Bank in 2008. Century National has eighteen branches, the main branch is in Zanesville. They have locations in Zanesville, Dresden, New Concord, New Lexington, and Coshocton. The president of this division is Pat Nash. Century National also has eighteen branches, however the branches are closer to each other.
