= Dillion =

Dillion may refer to:

- James Dillion (1929–2010), American Olympic discus thrower
- Dillion Everett, a character in the science fiction television series Stargate: Atlantis
- Dillion Creek, a stream in Missouri

== See also ==
- Dillian Gordon, British art historian and curator at the National Gallery, London, from 1978 to 2010
- Dillian Whyte (born 1988), British boxer and former kickboxer and mixed martial artist
- Dillon (disambiguation)
