= Toboso, Ohio =

Unincorporated community in Ohio, U.S.

Coordinates: 40°03′23″N 82°13′06″W

Toboso is an unincorporated community in Hanover Township, Licking County, Ohio, United States.

== History ==
Toboso was laid out in 1852 when the railroad was extended to that point. The community most likely was named after El Toboso, in Spain. A post office was in operation at Toboso from 1854 until 1957.
