= Claylick, Ohio =

Town in Ohio, United States

Coordinates: 40°03′30″N 82°17′14″W

Claylick is a former town in Licking County, in the U.S. state of Ohio. The GNIS classifies it as a populated place.

== History ==
The community took its name from nearby Clay Lick Creek. A post office called Clay Lick was established in 1852, and remained in operation until 1918. Claylick once had a mill and a store.
