= Dillon Falls, Ohio =

Unincorporated community in Ohio, U.S.

Coordinates: 39°58′22″N 82°03′21″W

Dillon Falls is an unincorporated community in Muskingum County, in the U.S. state of Ohio.

== History ==
Dillon Falls was named for Moses Dillon, who settled here at the falls of the Licking River. A variant name was Dillon. A post office called Dillon was established in 1887, and remained in operation until 1908. Besides the post office, Dillon Falls had a station on the Baltimore and Ohio Railroad.
