= Dillon, Illinois =

- Unincorporated community
- Location within Illinois Location within the United States
- Coordinates: 40°28′36″N 89°32′17″W
- Country: United States
- State: Illinois
- County: Tazewell
- Elevation: 627 ft (191 m)
- Time zone: UTC-6 (Central (CST))
  - Summer (DST): UTC-5 (CDT)
- Area code: 309
- GNIS feature ID: 407219

Dillon is an unincorporated community in Tazewell County, in the U.S. state of Illinois.

== History ==
Dillon was laid out in 1836, and named in honor of Nathan Dillon, a county official. The Dillon post office was discontinued in 1901.
