= Dillon Lake =

- Location within Ohio Location within the United States
- Location: Muskingum County, Ohio
- Coordinates: 40.0026127°N 82.0966435°W
- Type: reservoir
- Etymology: Moses Dillon
- Surface area: 1,736 acres (703 ha)

Dillon Lake is a reservoir in Muskingum County, Ohio in the United States. It was completed in 1961, covers 1,736 acres of water and was constructed primarily for flood control purposes. The lake was named after Moses Dillon, who purchased the land in 1803/1804
