= Shade River =

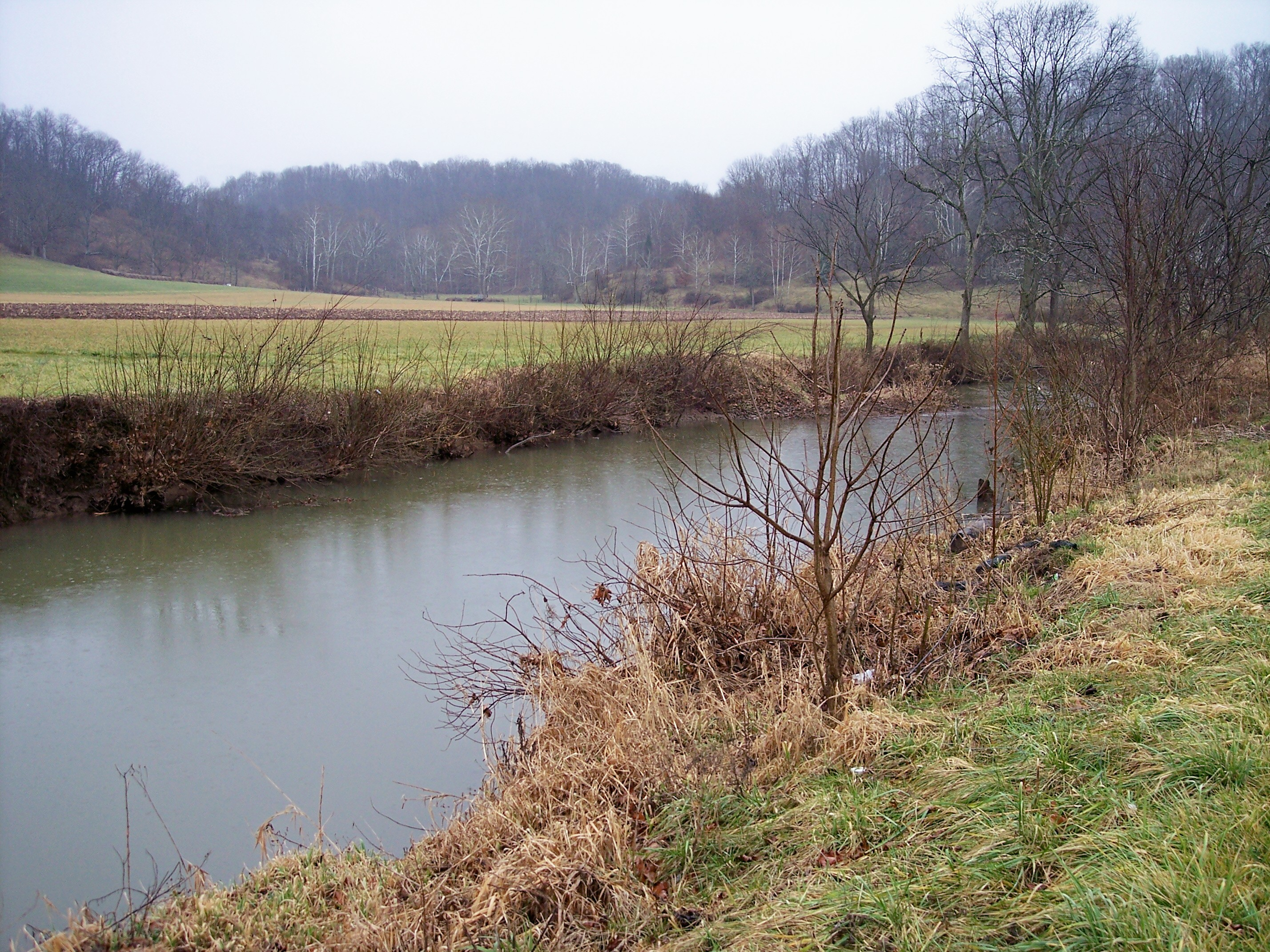
- The East Branch of the Shade River in Chester Township in 2006

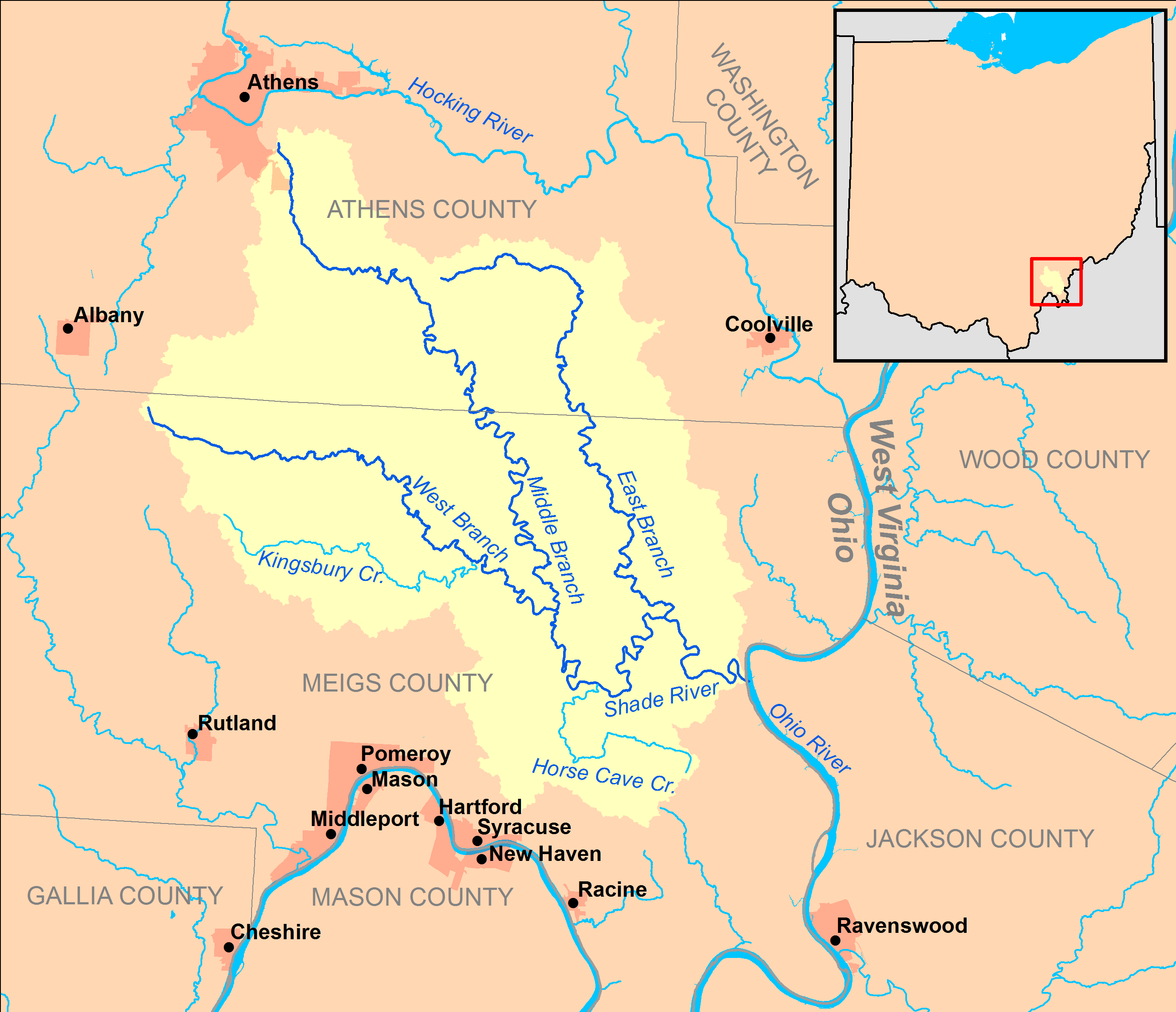
- Map of the Shade River and its watershed

Location
- Country: United States
- State: Ohio
- County: Meigs

Physical characteristics
- Source: West Branch Shade River
  - location: Scipio Township, Meigs County
  - coordinates: 39°11′28″N 82°09′24″W
  - length: 20.8 mi (33.5 km)
  - elevation: 853 ft (260 m)
- 2nd source: Middle Branch Shade River
  - location: Athens Township, Athens County
  - coordinates: 39°18′33″N 82°04′52″W
  - length: 28.5 mi (45.9 km)
  - elevation: 950 ft (290 m)
- Source confluence
  - location: Chester Township, Meigs County
  - coordinates: 39°05′58″N 81°55′21″W
  - elevation: 574 ft (175 m)
- Mouth: Ohio River
  - location: Olive Township, Meigs County
  - coordinates: 39°04′03″N 81°48′49″W
  - elevation: 561 ft (171 m)
- Length: 17.4 mi (28.0 km)
- Basin size: 221 mi^{2} (570 km^{2})
- Discharge
  - location: near Chester
  - average: 174 cu ft/s (4.9 m^{3}/s)
  - minimum: 0.00 cu ft/s (0 m^{3}/s)
  - maximum: 15,600 cu ft/s (440 m^{3}/s)

Basin features
- Tributaries
  - left: East Branch Shade River

The Shade River is a tributary of the Ohio River in southeastern Ohio in the United States. Via the Ohio River, it is part of the watershed of the Mississippi River, draining an area of 221 square miles (570 km^{2}) on the unglaciated portion of the Allegheny Plateau. The Shade River is 17.4 miles (28.0 km) long, or 38.2 miles (61.5 km) including its west branch.

The Shade River flows predominantly as three streams, its east, middle, and west branches. It is formed by the confluence of its middle and west branches, and collects its east branch shortly thereafter:

- The West Branch Shade River rises in Scipio Township in Meigs County, at an elevation of 853 feet (260 m), and flows east-southeastwardly through Bedford and Chester Townships. The West Branch is 20.8 miles (33.5 km) long and drains an area of 71.3 square miles (185 km^{2}).
- The Middle Branch Shade River rises southeast of the city of Athens in Athens Township in Athens County, at an elevation of 950 feet (290 m), and flows southeastwardly through Alexander, Lodi, and Carthage Townships in Athens County; and Bedford, Orange, and Chester Townships in Meigs County. The Middle Branch is 28.5 miles (45.9 km) long and drains an area of 57.6 square miles (149 km^{2}).
- The East Branch Shade River rises in Lodi Township in Athens County, at an elevation of 916 feet (279 m), and flows south-southeastwardly through Carthage Township in Athens County, and Orange and Chester Townships in Meigs County. The East Branch is 21.9 miles (35.2 km) long and drains an area of 54.9 square miles (142 km^{2}).

From the confluence of the middle and west branches in Chester Township, the Shade River flows generally eastwardly, past the community of Chester. It collects its east branch from the north at the community of Keno, and enters the Ohio River in Olive Township, approximately one mile (1.6 km) south of the community of Long Bottom.

According to the Geographic Names Information System, the Shade River has also been known historically as "Shade Creek" and as "Devils Hole Creek."

== Flow rate ==
At the United States Geological Survey's stream gauge downstream of Chester, the annual mean flow of the river between 1965 and 2012 was 174 cubic feet per second (4.9 cubic meters per second). The highest recorded flow during the period was 15,600 cu ft/s (440 m^{3}/s) on March 2, 1997. The lowest recorded flow was 0.00 cu ft/s (0 m^{3}/s) on September 5, 2007.

== See also ==
- List of rivers of Ohio
- Shade River State Forest
