= Fox Lake Wildlife Area =

Coordinates: 39.302°N 82.193°W

- Interactive map of Fox Lake Wildlife Area
- Type: Wildlife area
- Location: Athens County, Ohio
- Nearest city: New Marshfield, Ohio
- Area: 421 acres (170 ha)

Fox Lake Wildlife Area is a 421-acre (170 ha) Ohio state wildlife area in southeastern Waterloo Township in Athens County, Ohio. It is centered on 48-acre (19 ha) Fox Lake, which is generally oriented east–west, and which is located on Margaret Creek, a tributary of the Hocking River. The lake was impounded originally for flood control.

The eastern end of the wildlife area, just east of the lake's dam, is on Brown Road, and the western end, at the head of the lake, is reached from Fox Lake Road. There is a paved parking area at the head of the lake with a handicapped-accessible fishing dock. There is a gravel parking area at the dam.

There are sandstone bluffs to the north and south of the lake, but with an embedded limestone stratum, and there is more limestone at the base of the bluffs, so the area has limestone-loving plants such as chinkapin oak and Shumard oak. There are rounded indentations in the limestone stratum that have been given the name "cradle in the rock."

The nearest community is New Marshfield, Ohio.
