= Troy Township, Athens County, Ohio =

Township in Ohio, US

- Township
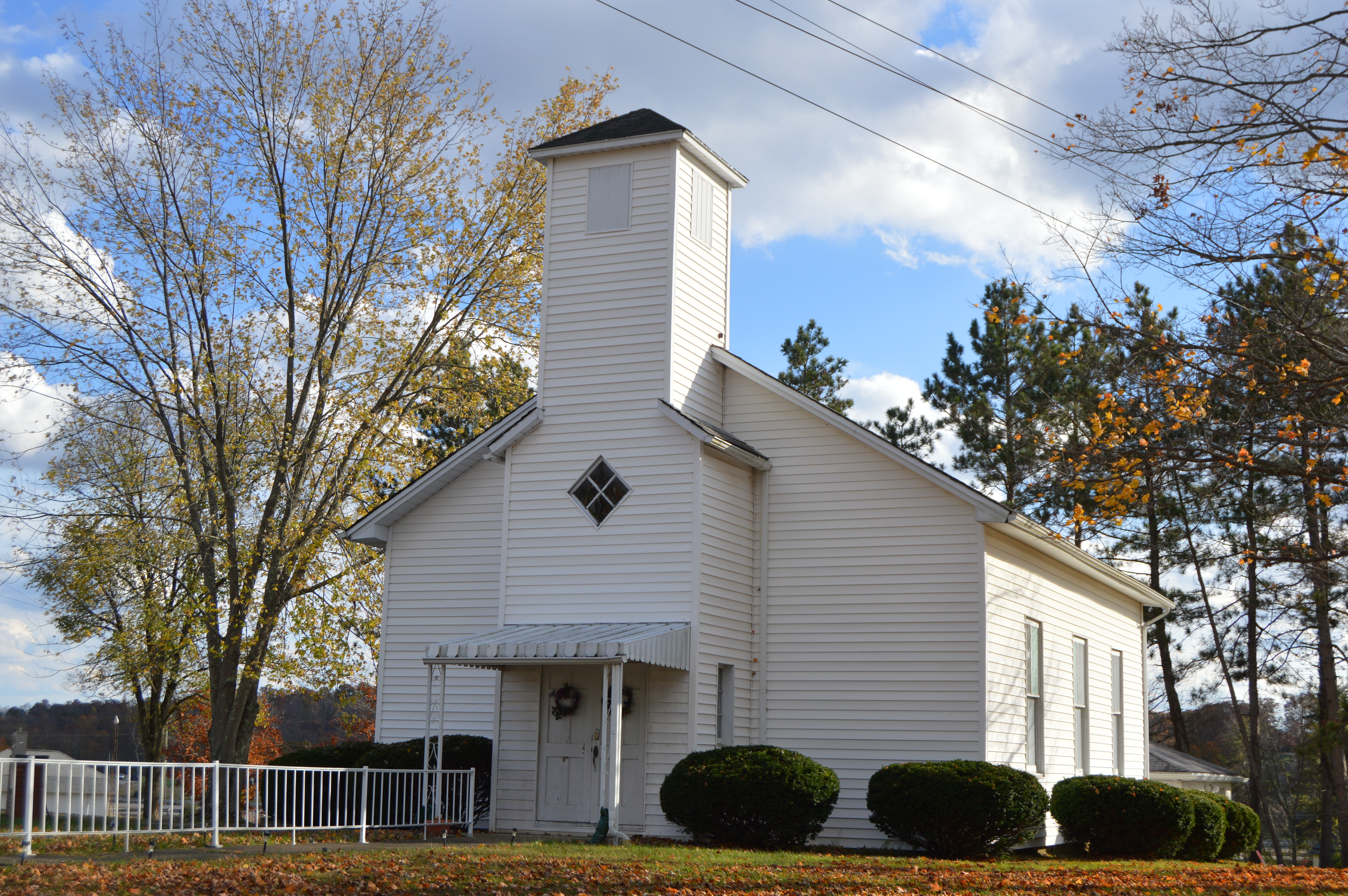
- Methodist church at Torch

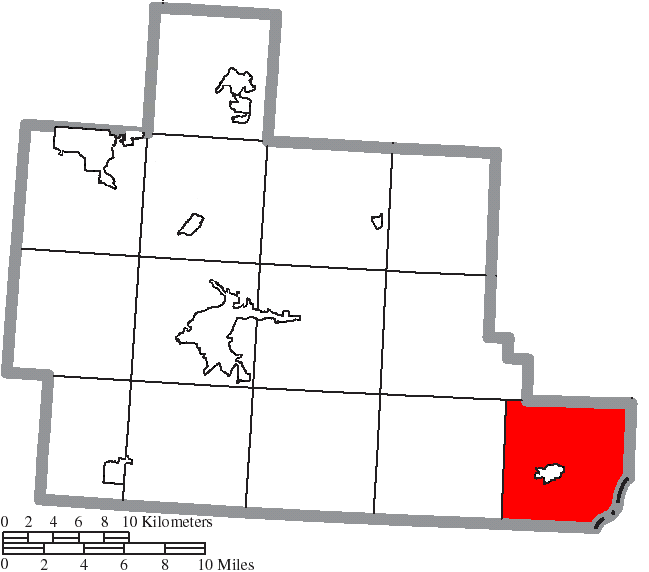
- Location of Troy Township in Athens County
- Coordinates: 39°13′22″N 81°47′13″W
- Country: United States
- State: Ohio
- County: Athens

Area
  - Total: 36.9 sq mi (95.6 km^{2})
  - Land: 36.2 sq mi (93.7 km^{2})
  - Water: 0.69 sq mi (1.8 km^{2})
- Elevation: 768 ft (234 m)

Population (2020)
  - Total: 2,490
  - Density: 68.8/sq mi (26.6/km^{2})
- Time zone: UTC-5 (Eastern (EST))
  - Summer (DST): UTC-4 (EDT)
- FIPS code: 39-77546
- GNIS feature ID: 1085759

Troy Township is one of the fourteen townships of Athens County, Ohio, United States. The 2020 census found 2,490 people in the township.

== Geography ==
Located in the southeastern corner of the county along the Ohio River, it borders the following townships:

- Decatur Township, Washington County - north
- Belpre Township, Washington County - northeast
- Olive Township, Meigs County - south
- Orange Township, Meigs County - southwest corner
- Carthage Township - west
- Rome Township - northwest

Wood County, West Virginia lies across the Ohio River to the southeast.

The village of Coolville is located in central Troy Township, and the unincorporated community of Hockingport lies along the Ohio River shoreline.

== Name and history ==
It is one of seven Troy Townships statewide.

In 1833, Troy Township contained several stores and mills.

== Government ==
The township is governed by a three-member board of trustees, who are elected in November of odd-numbered years to a four-year term beginning on the following January 1. Two are elected in the year after the presidential election and one is elected in the year before it. There is also an elected township fiscal officer, who serves a four-year term beginning on April 1 of the year after the election, which is held in November of the year before the presidential election. Vacancies in the fiscal officership or on the board of trustees are filled by the remaining trustees.
