= Hartleyville =

Hartleyville may refer to:

- Hartleyville, Indiana
- Hartleyville, Ohio
