= Athens County, Ohio =

County in Ohio, United States

- County
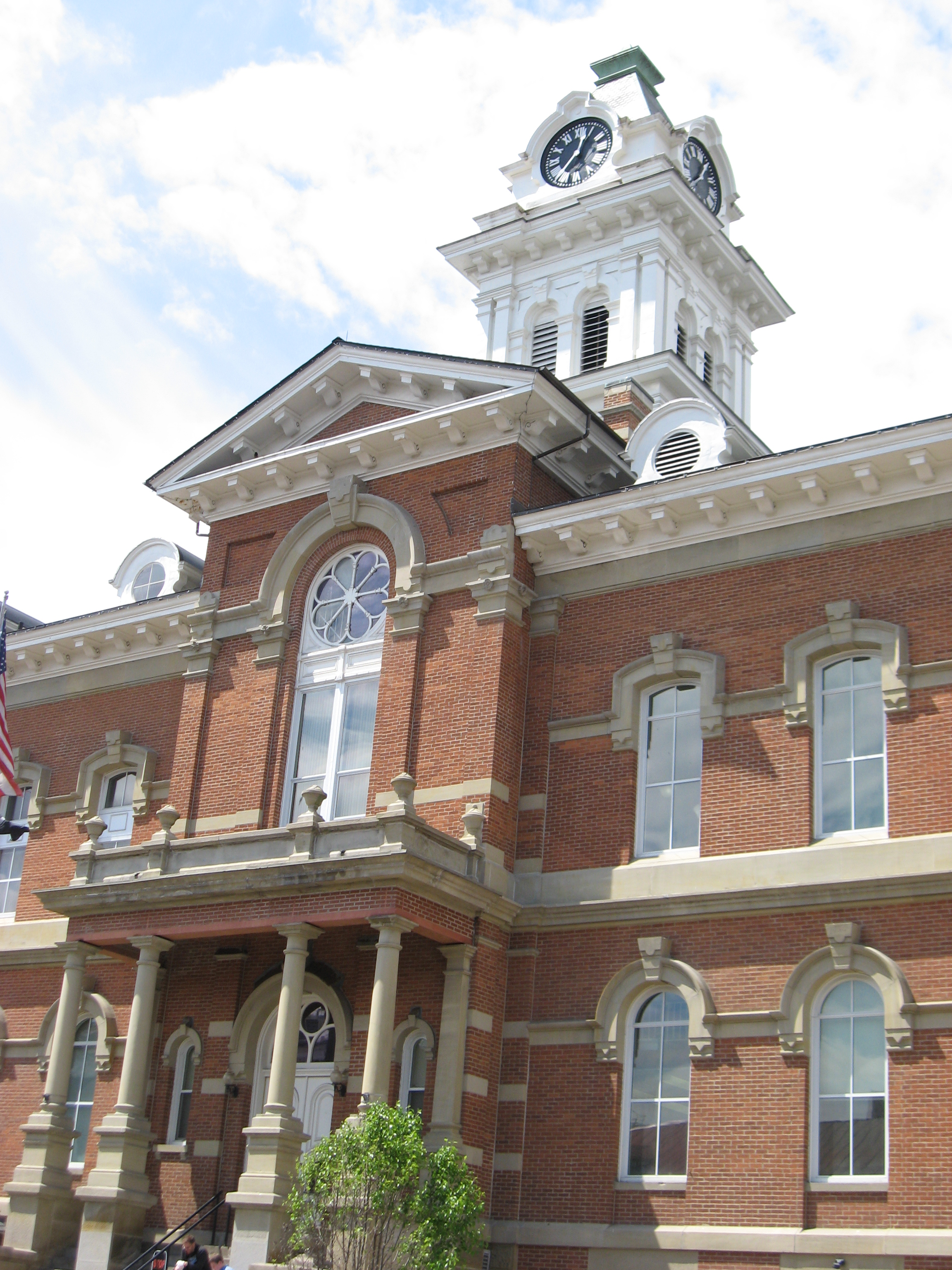
- The Athens County Courthouse in Athens

- Flag Seal

- Location within the U.S. state of Ohio
- Coordinates: 39°20′N 82°03′W
- Country: United States
- State: Ohio
- Founded: March 1, 1805
- Named for: Athens, Greece
- Seat: Athens
- Largest city: Athens

Area
  - Total: 508 sq mi (1,320 km^{2})
  - Land: 504 sq mi (1,310 km^{2})
  - Water: 4.8 sq mi (12 km^{2}) 1.0%

Population (2020)
  - Total: 62,431
  - Estimate (2025): 63,197 ▲
  - Density: 120/sq mi (46/km^{2})
- Time zone: UTC−5 (Eastern)
  - Summer (DST): UTC−4 (EDT)
- Congressional district: 12th
- Website: www.co.athensoh.org

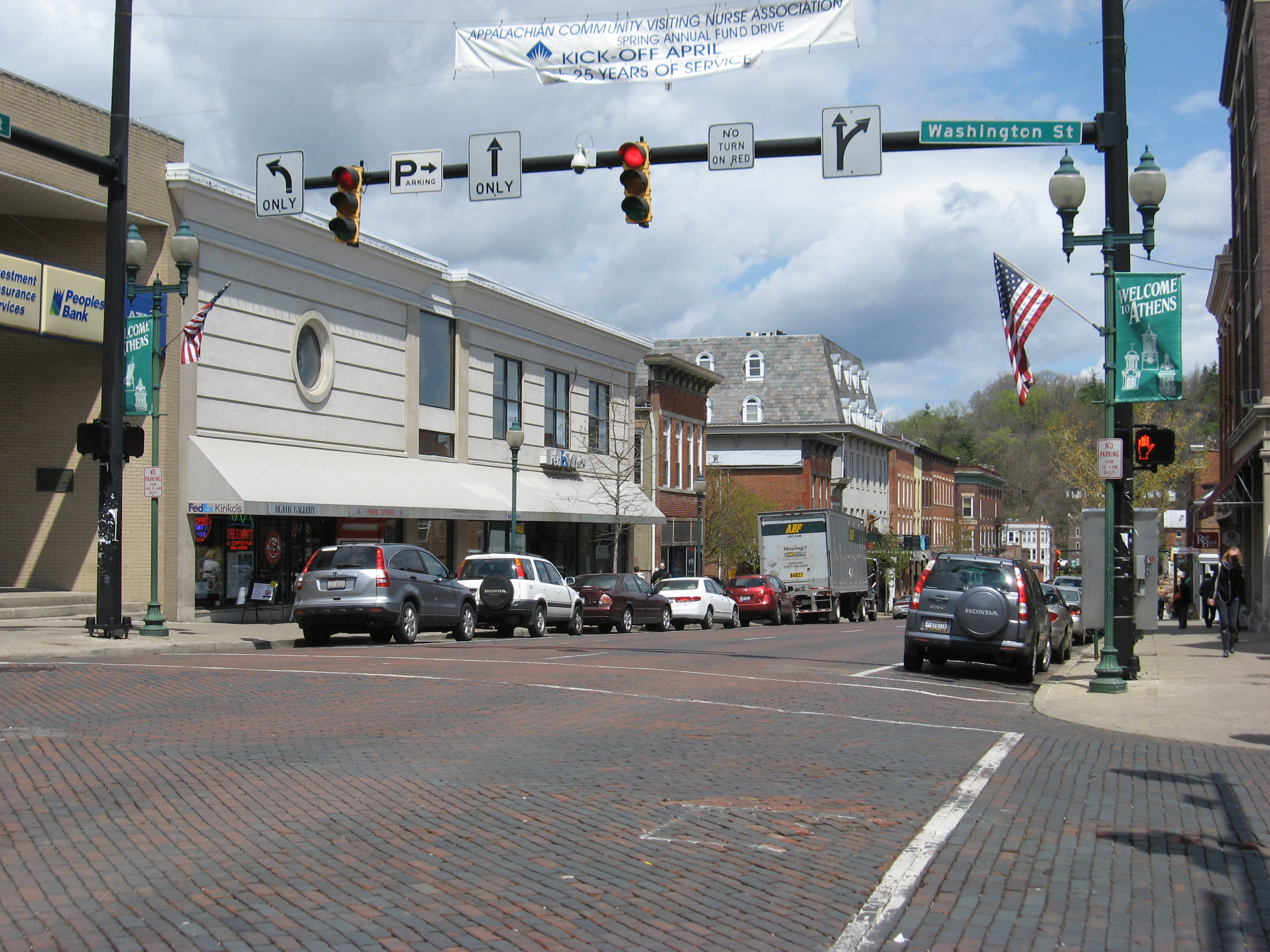
Court Street, main street in uptown Athens

Athens County is a county in southeastern Ohio. As of the 2020 census, the population was 62,431. Its county seat and largest city is Athens. The county was formed in 1805 from Washington County. Because Ohio's first state university, Ohio University, was established here in 1804, the town and the county are named for the ancient center of learning, Athens, Greece.

Athens County comprises the Athens, OH Micropolitan Statistical Area.

== Geography ==
The county has a total area of 508 square miles (1,320 km^{2}), of which 504 square miles (1,310 km^{2}) is land and 4.8 square miles (12 km^{2}) (1.0%) is water.

Athens County is located in the Unglaciated Allegheny Plateau region of Ohio. It features steep, rugged hills, with typical relief of 150 to 400 feet, deeply dissected by stream valleys, many of them remnant from the ancient Teays River drainage system. Most of Athens County is within the Hocking River watershed, with smaller areas in the Shade River and Raccoon Creek watersheds. The Hocking River joins the Ohio River at the unincorporated village of Hockingport in Athens County.

=== Adjacent counties ===
- Perry County (north)
- Morgan County (northeast)
- Washington County (east)
- Wood County, West Virginia (southeast)
- Meigs County (south)
- Vinton County (west)
- Hocking County (northwest)

== Demographics ==
Historical population
Census	Pop.	Note	%±
1810	2,791		—
1820	6,338		127.1%
1830	9,787		54.4%
1840	19,109		95.2%
1850	18,215		−4.7%
1860	21,364		17.3%
1870	23,768		11.3%
1880	28,411		19.5%
1890	35,194		23.9%
1900	38,730		10.0%
1910	47,798		23.4%
1920	50,430		5.5%
1930	44,175		−12.4%
1940	46,166		4.5%
1950	45,839		−0.7%
1960	46,998		2.5%
1970	54,889		16.8%
1980	56,399		2.8%
1990	59,549		5.6%
2000	62,223		4.5%
2010	64,757		4.1%
2020	62,431		−3.6%
2025 (est.)	63,197	▲	1.2%
U.S. Decennial Census; 1790–1960 1900–1990; 1990–2000 2020

=== 2020 census ===
As of the 2020 census, the county had a population of 62,431 and a median age of 29.5 years. 15.7% of residents were under the age of 18 and 14.4% were 65 years of age or older, and there were 97.6 males for every 100 females and 96.4 males for every 100 females age 18 and over.

The racial makeup of the county was 87.3% White, 4.6% Black or African American, 0.4% American Indian and Alaska Native, 2.0% Asian, <0.1% Native Hawaiian and Pacific Islander, 1.0% from some other race, and 4.7% from two or more races. Hispanic or Latino residents of any race comprised 2.3% of the population.

51.3% of residents lived in urban areas, while 48.7% lived in rural areas.

There were 23,696 households in the county, of which 23.2% had children under the age of 18 living in them. Of all households, 36.7% were married-couple households, 25.0% were households with a male householder and no spouse or partner present, and 29.7% were households with a female householder and no spouse or partner present. About 33.7% of all households were made up of individuals and 11.0% had someone living alone who was 65 years of age or older.

There were 26,386 housing units, of which 10.2% were vacant. Among occupied housing units, 54.4% were owner-occupied and 45.6% were renter-occupied. The homeowner vacancy rate was 1.2% and the rental vacancy rate was 7.0%.

=== Racial and ethnic composition ===
Athens County, Ohio – Racial and ethnic composition Note: the US Census treats Hispanic/Latino as an ethnic category. This table excludes Latinos from the racial categories and assigns them to a separate category. Hispanics/Latinos may be of any race.
Race / ethnicity (NH = Non-Hispanic)	Pop 1980	Pop 1990	Pop 2000	Pop 2010	Pop 2020	% 1980	% 1990	% 2000	% 2010	% 2020
White alone (NH)	52,996	55,884	57,768	58,779	54,086	93.97%	93.85%	92.84%	90.77%	86.63%
Black or African American alone (NH)	1,630	1,654	1,467	1,741	2,768	2.89%	2.78%	2.36%	2.69%	4.43%
Native American or Alaska Native alone (NH)	85	164	164	140	223	0.15%	0.28%	0.26%	0.22%	0.36%
Asian alone (NH)	458	1,361	1,180	1,741	1,210	0.81%	2.29%	1.90%	2.69%	1.94%
Native Hawaiian or Pacific Islander alone (NH)	x	x	11	13	1	x	x	0.02%	0.02%	0.00%
Other race alone (NH)	750	48	74	67	256	1.33%	0.08%	0.12%	0.10%	0.41%
Mixed race or Multiracial (NH)	x	x	920	1,274	2,437	x	x	1.48%	1.97%	3.90%
Hispanic or Latino (any race)	480	438	639	1,002	1,450	0.85%	0.74%	1.03%	1.55%	2.32%
Total	56,399	59,549	62,223	64,757	62,431	100.00%	100.00%	100.00%	100.00%	100.00%

=== 2010 census ===
As of the census of 2010, there were 64,757 people, 23,578 households, and 12,453 families living in the county. The population density was 128.6 inhabitants per square mile (49.7/km^{2}). There were 26,385 housing units at an average density of 52.4 units per square mile (20.2 units/km^{2}). The racial makeup of the county was 91.8% White, 2.7% Black or African American, 2.7% Asian, 0.3% American Indian, 0.4% from other races, and 2.1% from two or more races. Those of Hispanic or Latino origin made up 1.5% of the population. In terms of ancestry, 22.1% were German, 15.2% were American, 14.0% were Irish, 10.4% were English, and 5.5% were Italian.

Of the 23,578 households, 24.3% had children under the age of 18 living with them, 39.3% were married couples living together, 9.2% had a female householder with no husband present, 47.2% were non-families, and 30.0% of all households were made up of individuals. The average household size was 2.35 and the average family size was 2.87. The median age was 26.3 years.

The median income for a household in the county was $31,559 and the median income for a family was $48,170. Males had a median income of $38,135 versus $31,263 for females. The per capita income for the county was $16,642. About 16.6% of families and 30.3% of the population were below the poverty line, including 29.6% of those under age 18 and 9.2% of those age 65 or over.

=== 2000 census ===
As of the census of 2000, there were 62,223 people, 22,501 households, and 12,713 families living in the county. The population density was 123 inhabitants per square mile (47/km^{2}). There were 24,901 housing units at an average density of 49 units per square mile (19/km^{2}). The racial makeup of the county was 93.48% White, 2.39% Black or African American, 0.28% Native American, 1.90% Asian, 0.02% Pacific Islander, 0.36% from other races, and 1.56% from two or more races. 1.03% of the population were Hispanic or Latino of any race. 21.4% were of German, 13.9% American, 12.9% Irish, 11.1% English, and 5.6% Italian ancestry.

There were 22,501 households, out of which 26.40% had children under the age of 18 living with them, 43.50% were married couples living together, 9.20% had a female householder with no husband present, and 43.50% were non-families. 28.30% of all households were made up of individuals, and 8.30% had someone living alone who was 65 years of age or older. The average household size was 2.40 and the average family size was 2.92.

In the county, the population was spread out, with 18.30% under the age of 18, 30.70% from 18 to 24, 23.70% from 25 to 44, 18.00% from 45 to 64, and 9.30% who were 65 years of age or older. The median age was 26 years. For every 100 females there were 95.60 males. For every 100 females age 18 and over, there were 93.30 males.

The median income for a household in the county was $27,322, and the median income for a family was $39,785. Males had a median income of $30,776 versus $23,905 for females. The per capita income for the county was $14,171. About 14.00% of families and 27.40% of the population were below the poverty line, including 21.20% of those under age 18 and 12.90% of those age 65 or over.

== Communities ==
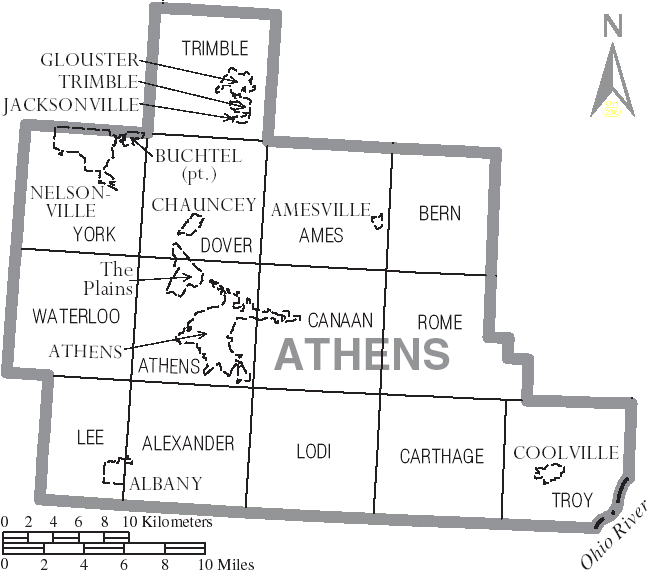
Map of Athens County, Ohio With Municipal and Township Labels

=== Cities ===
- Athens (county seat)
- Nelsonville

=== Villages ===
- Albany
- Amesville
- Buchtel
- Chauncey
- Coolville
- Glouster
- Jacksonville
- Trimble

=== Townships ===
- Alexander
- Ames
- Athens
- Bern
- Canaan
- Carthage
- Dover
- Lee
- Lodi
- Rome
- Trimble
- Troy
- Waterloo
- York

=== Census-designated places ===
- Hockingport
- Millfield
- New Marshfield
- Stewart
- The Plains

=== Unincorporated communities ===
- Beaumont
- Beebe
- Bessemer
- Big Run
- Burr Oak
- Canaanville
- Carbondale
- Doanville
- Frost
- Garden
- Glen Ebon
- Guysville
- Hamley Run
- Hartleyville
- Hebardville
- Liars Corner
- Lottridge
- Luhrig
- Mineral
- Modoc
- New England
- New Floodwood
- Pleasanton
- Pratts Fork
- Redtown
- Shade
- Sharpsburg
- Torch
- Utley

=== Ghost towns ===
- Ingham
- King's Station

== Politics ==
2020 Presidential Election by Township and City Biden: 50–60% 60–70% 80–90% Trump: 40–50% 50–60% 60–70% 70–80%

Like most counties dominated by state universities, Athens County is a Democratic stronghold. It was one of only two counties in Ohio to vote for George McGovern over Richard Nixon in 1972 (along with Lucas County) and in the 2014 gubernatorial election, it was one of only two counties to vote for Democrat Ed FitzGerald over Republican John Kasich (along with Monroe County). From 2016 to 2024, as Ohio has veered rightward in the era of Donald Trump, Athens County has become the lone base of consistent Democratic strength in Appalachian Ohio.

United States presidential election results for Athens County, Ohio
Year	Republican		Democratic		Third party(ies)	
Year	No.	%	No.	%	No.	%
1856	2,299	60.45%	1,350	35.50%	154	4.05%
1860	2,526	61.65%	1,491	36.39%	80	1.95%
1864	3,040	69.82%	1,314	30.18%	0	0.00%
1868	2,908	64.62%	1,592	35.38%	0	0.00%
1872	3,025	67.64%	1,398	31.26%	49	1.10%
1876	3,413	60.19%	2,195	38.71%	62	1.09%
1880	3,645	60.42%	2,234	37.03%	154	2.55%
1884	3,828	59.21%	2,252	34.83%	385	5.96%
1888	4,570	69.58%	1,612	24.54%	386	5.88%
1892	4,458	58.68%	2,599	34.21%	540	7.11%
1896	5,429	61.02%	3,293	37.01%	175	1.97%
1900	6,126	68.90%	2,529	28.44%	236	2.65%
1904	6,352	75.84%	1,594	19.03%	430	5.13%
1908	6,449	61.57%	3,654	34.88%	372	3.55%
1912	3,090	32.58%	2,393	25.23%	4,000	42.18%
1916	5,554	55.18%	4,101	40.74%	411	4.08%
1920	11,016	61.54%	6,523	36.44%	361	2.02%
1924	8,695	58.19%	2,669	17.86%	3,579	23.95%
1928	11,101	70.02%	4,546	28.67%	208	1.31%
1932	9,897	51.17%	8,915	46.09%	531	2.75%
1936	9,509	41.48%	13,205	57.61%	208	0.91%
1940	11,213	49.48%	11,449	50.52%	0	0.00%
1944	10,326	58.13%	7,438	41.87%	0	0.00%
1948	8,902	54.43%	7,398	45.24%	54	0.33%
1952	10,829	60.37%	7,108	39.63%	0	0.00%
1956	10,794	64.43%	5,959	35.57%	0	0.00%
1960	10,747	58.76%	7,542	41.24%	0	0.00%
1964	6,211	36.87%	10,633	63.13%	0	0.00%
1968	7,837	47.79%	7,351	44.82%	1,212	7.39%
1972	9,735	48.88%	9,977	50.10%	203	1.02%
1976	8,387	44.10%	9,896	52.04%	733	3.85%
1980	8,170	41.26%	9,514	48.05%	2,117	10.69%
1984	11,548	52.59%	10,201	46.46%	209	0.95%
1988	9,314	45.92%	10,795	53.23%	172	0.85%
1992	7,184	27.85%	13,423	52.04%	5,186	20.11%
1996	7,154	29.87%	13,418	56.02%	3,382	14.12%
2000	9,703	38.13%	13,158	51.71%	2,586	10.16%
2004	10,847	36.10%	18,998	63.23%	200	0.67%
2008	9,742	31.17%	20,722	66.29%	795	2.54%
2012	8,543	30.81%	18,307	66.02%	878	3.17%
2016	11,354	38.22%	16,370	55.10%	1,985	6.68%
2020	10,862	41.58%	14,772	56.55%	486	1.86%
2024	11,369	43.70%	14,134	54.33%	511	1.96%

United States Senate election results for Athens County, Ohio1
Year	Republican		Democratic		Third party(ies)	
Year	No.	%	No.	%	No.	%
2024	10,013	39.06%	14,696	57.32%	928	3.62%

== Economy ==
The largest employer in Athens County is Ohio University. Other significant employers include Appalachian Behavioral Healthcare, Hocking College, Diagnostic Hybrids, O'Bleness Memorial Hospital, Rocky Brands, Stewart-MacDonald, Wayne National Forest, and a growing number of retail stores and restaurants. Local government, local school districts, and nonprofit organizations employ many county residents.

Historically, the first large-scale industry was salt production. Coal mining and timber harvesting played major roles in Athens County's economy, as did the treatment and care of the mentally ill.

The coal industry has declined dramatically from its peak years. Only Buckingham Coal is still mining in the county, in Trimble Township north of Glouster. Gravel and limestone are mined at several quarries in the county. Active oil and natural gas wells are found in low numbers throughout Athens County.

Forestry still contributes to the Athens County economy, both in the private sector and in the public sector. The headquarters for Wayne National Forest is located between Athens and Nelsonville.

Farming and market gardening continue to thrive in the area. The largest farms specialize in beef and dairy production. The Athens Farmers Market, an outdoor market, continues to grow in popularity. Local and organically grown produce is found in abundance during the summer months.

Also, tourism is a large and growing component of the county's economy. The county is a regional music center and home to many arts and crafts businesses. Many visitors to the county are drawn to its natural resources and abundant wildlife. Hunting and fishing are popular activities in season. The county has over 19 miles of paved bike path in and between Athens and Nelsonville. Hiking and mountain biking are popular throughout the county, especially in the state parks and national forest.

Higher education remains the cornerstone of the county's economy. Over one-quarter of the county's residents either attend or work at Hocking College or Ohio University.

== Education ==
=== Colleges and universities ===
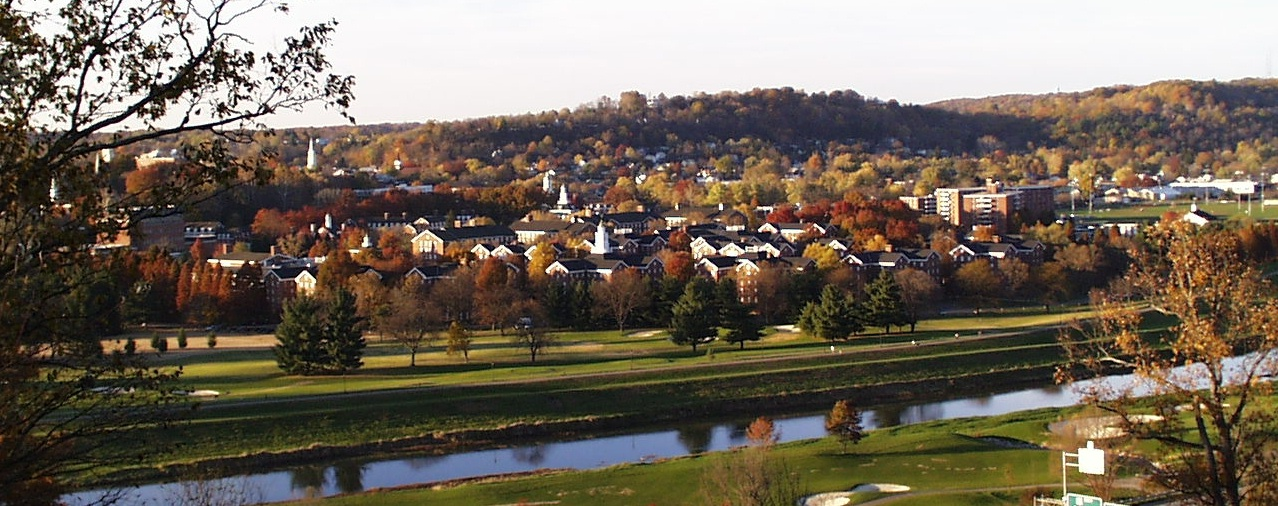
Ohio University in the Fall, facing its South Green

Athens County is home to Hocking College in Nelsonville and Ohio University in the City of Athens.

=== K-12 schools ===
The residents of Athens County are served by the five school districts: the Alexander Local School District, Athens City School District, the Federal Hocking Local School District, Nelsonville-York City School District, and the Trimble Local School District.

=== Libraries ===
They are also served by the Athens County Public Libraries with branches in Albany, Athens, Chauncey, Coolville, Glouster, Nelsonville, and The Plains.

== Media ==
News publications

- The Athens Messenger, a daily paper published by the Adams Publishing Group, which also owns The Athens News.
- The Athens News, a free semiweekly tabloid.
- The Post, the student newspaper of Ohio University
- The Spire, the student newspaper of Hocking College, is published on an occasional basis
- Athens County Independent, a free nonprofit digital news site.

Noncommercial Television

- WOUB-TV, 20 and 27-HD (PBS affiliate, Ohio University, Athens)

Noncommercial Radio

- WEAK-FM, 106.7, (Low Power FM, Athens)
- WOUB-FM, 91.3 (NPR affiliate, Ohio University, Athens)
- WOUB-AM, 1340 (NPR affiliate, Ohio University, Athens)
- WLCI-FM, 97.5 (Hocking College student radio, Nelsonville)

Commercial Radio

- WXTQ-FM, 105.5 (Athens)
- WJKW-FM, 95.9 (Athens)
- WATH-AM, 970 (Athens)
- WSEO-FM, 107.7 (Nelsonville)
- WAIS-AM, 770 (Nelsonville)

== Public lands ==
=== Federal lands ===
- Belleville Lock and Dam Public Access Area (Troy Township)
- Tom Jenkins Dam (at Burr Oak State Park, Trimble Township)
- Wayne National Forest (Dover, York, Trimble, Canaan Townships)

=== State lands ===
- Burr Oak State Park
- Strouds Run State Park
- Acadia Cliffs State Nature Preserve
- Fox Lake Wildlife Area
- Waterloo Wildlife Research Station
- Marie J. Desonier State Nature Preserve
- Riddle State Nature Preserve
- Gifford State Forest
- Waterloo State Forest
- Zaleski State Forest

=== County properties ===
- Ferndale Park
- County Farm
- Hockhocking-Adena Bike Path
- Moonville Rail-Trail

== See also ==
- National Register of Historic Places listings in Athens County, Ohio
