= Athens City School District =

School district in Ohio, United States

Address
- 21 Birge Drive Chauncey, Ohio, 45719; United States

District information
- Type: Public
- Grades: PK–12
- Superintendent: Tom Gibbs
- Schools: 5
- NCES District ID: 3904352

Students and staff
- Students: 2,267 (2025–2026)
- Teachers: 150.50 (on an FTE basis) (2025–2026)
- Staff: 365.59 (on an FTE basis) (2025–2026)
- Student–teacher ratio: 15.06 (2025–2026)

Other information
- Website: www.athenscsd.org

The Athens City School District is a public school district in Athens County, Ohio, United States, based in Athens, Ohio.

== Schools ==
The Athens City School District currently has two primary elementary schools (preschool-3), one intermediate (4-6) elementary school, one middle school (7-8), and one high school. The elementary schools and middle school are located in the city of Athens while the intermediate school and high school are located in The Plains, OH.

=== Elementary Schools (Preschool–3) ===
- East Elementary School
- Morrison-Gordon Elementary School

=== Intermediate School (4–6) ===
- The Plains Intermediate School

=== Middle School (7–8) ===
- Athens Middle School

=== High School (9–12) ===
- Athens High School

== History ==
=== Consolidation ===
The district consolidated its school district from one preschool, four elementary schools, a middle school, and a high school in 2019 to two elementaries, an intermediate school, a middle school and a high school by 2023, going from the ACS Early Learning Center, West Elementary, East Elementary, Morrison-Gordon Elementary, The Plains Elementary, Athens Middle School and Athens High School to East Elementary, Morrison-Gordon Elementary, The Plains Intermediate School, Athens Middle School and Athens High School. The remaining elementary schools, East Elementary and Morrison-Gordon Elementary (both having been demolished and replaced by new buildings on the same sites) previously served students from kindergarten to sixth grade but are now preschool-3. The Plains Elementary was not demolished but expanded, and is now The Plains Intermediate, now serving grades 4-6.

Chauncy Elementary was closed in 2012 but was not demolished, housing the school district's standalone preschool, the Athens City Early Learning Center, for a brief period before the students were moved to the new preschool programs at East Elementary and Morrison-Gordon Elementary respectively in 2022. A portion of the building now houses the school district's administrative offices, with the remaining portion of the facility (between 60% and two-thirds) being leased to the Athens-Meigs Educational Service Center.

=== Demolition and Construction ===
The old East Elementary building was demolished from 2019 to 2020, with the look of the new building having been inspired in part by the even earlier "East Side Elementary" (later replaced by the previous East Elementary building). The current building opened in the fall of 2021.

West Elementary School (41 Central Ave.) was demolished in 2023 (costing $900,000). Nothing has yet taken its place; the school board rejected a proposal from the city to buy a portion of the site to build affordable housing (in the form of four duplexes) in late 2024.

The district will build a new $58–60 million high school to replace the current Athens High School, which for some time has been in somewhat of a state of disrepair, breaking ground in June 2025 and with completion estimating to be in 2027.
