= Big Run =

Big Run may refer to:

- Big Run, Ohio
- Big Run, Jefferson County, Pennsylvania
- Big Run, Marion County, West Virginia
- Big Run, Marshall County, West Virginia
- Big Run, Webster County, West Virginia
- Big Run, Wetzel County, West Virginia
- Big Run (East Branch Fishing Creek), in Sullivan County, Pennsylvania
- Big Run (Little Muncy Creek), in Lycoming County, Pennsylvania
- Big Run (South Branch Potomac River), in Hampshire County, West Virginia
- Big Run (West Branch Fishing Creek), in Sullivan County, Pennsylvania
- Big Run (Slippery Rock Creek tributary), in Butler County, Pennsylvania
- Big Run, a 1989 arcade game developed by Jaleco
