= Doanville, Ohio =

Unincorporated community in Ohio, U.S.

Coordinates: 39°26′06″N 82°11′29″W

Doanville is an unincorporated community in Athens County, in the U.S. state of Ohio.

== History ==
A post office called Doanville was established in 1901, and remained in operation until 1966. Besides the post office, Doanville had a country store.
