= Beebe, Ohio =

Unincorporated community in Ohio, U.S.

Coordinates: 39°18′46″N 81°51′28″W

Beebe is an unincorporated community in Athens County, in the U.S. state of Ohio.

== History ==
A post office called Beebe was established in 1875, and remained in operation until 1931. Beebe was the name of a local family in Rome Township.
