= Hockingport, Ohio =

- Census-designated place
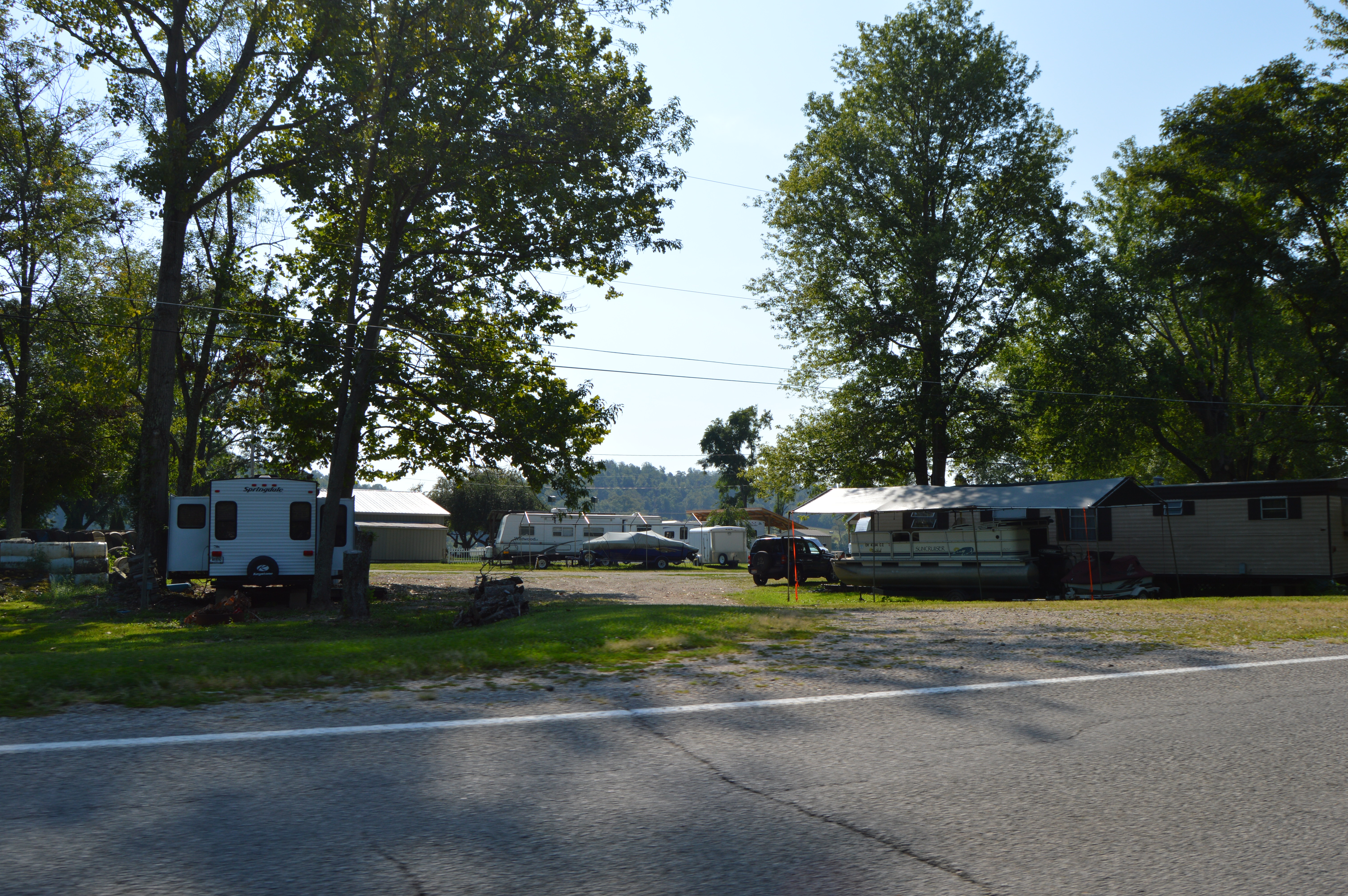
- Looking eastward from State Route 124 into a campground in Hockingport, Ohio

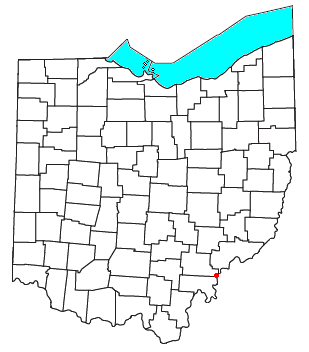
- Location of Hockingport, Ohio
- Coordinates: 39°11′25″N 81°4′13″W
- Country: United States
- State: Ohio
- County: Athens
- Township: Troy
- Elevation: 633 ft (193 m)

Population (2020)
  - Total: 205
- Time zone: UTC-5 (Eastern (EST))
  - Summer (DST): UTC-4 (EDT)
- ZIP code: 45739
- Area code: 740
- GNIS feature ID: 2628901

Hockingport is a census-designated place in southeastern Troy Township, Athens County, Ohio, United States. As of the 2020 census it had a population of 205. It has a post office with the ZIP code 45739. It is located at the intersection of State Routes 124 and 144.

It lies on the Ohio River, located below Little Hocking and above Reedsville.

== History ==
Hockingport was the site of a pre-revolutionary military camp and fortification built in October 1774 by Virginia militiamen under Lord Dunmore at the confluence of the Hocking and Ohio Rivers called Fort Gower. The fort served as the base camp for the militia during Dunmore's War. It was the namesake fort of the Fort Gower Resolves issued by the soldiers stationed there in Nov. 1774. Among the officers present were many Virginians that would go on to become famous during the revolution. Present were William Campbell, George Rogers Clark, William Crawford, Simon Kenton, Andrew Lewis, Daniel Morgan, William Russell, Adam Stephen and many others. The fort was abandoned after Dunmore's War. Today the site of the fort is believed to be under water just beyond the point.

A post office called Hockingport has been in operation since 1838. The community was a shipping point on the Hocking River, hence the name.
