= Glen Ebon, Ohio =

Unincorporated community in Ohio, U.S.

Coordinates: 39°24′15″N 82°11′27″W

Glen Ebon is an unincorporated community in Athens County, in the U.S. state of Ohio. The community is located at the Wayne National Forest.

== History ==
A post office called Glen Ebon was established in 1886, and remained in operation until 1902.
