= Dover Township, Athens County, Ohio =

Township in Ohio, US

- Township
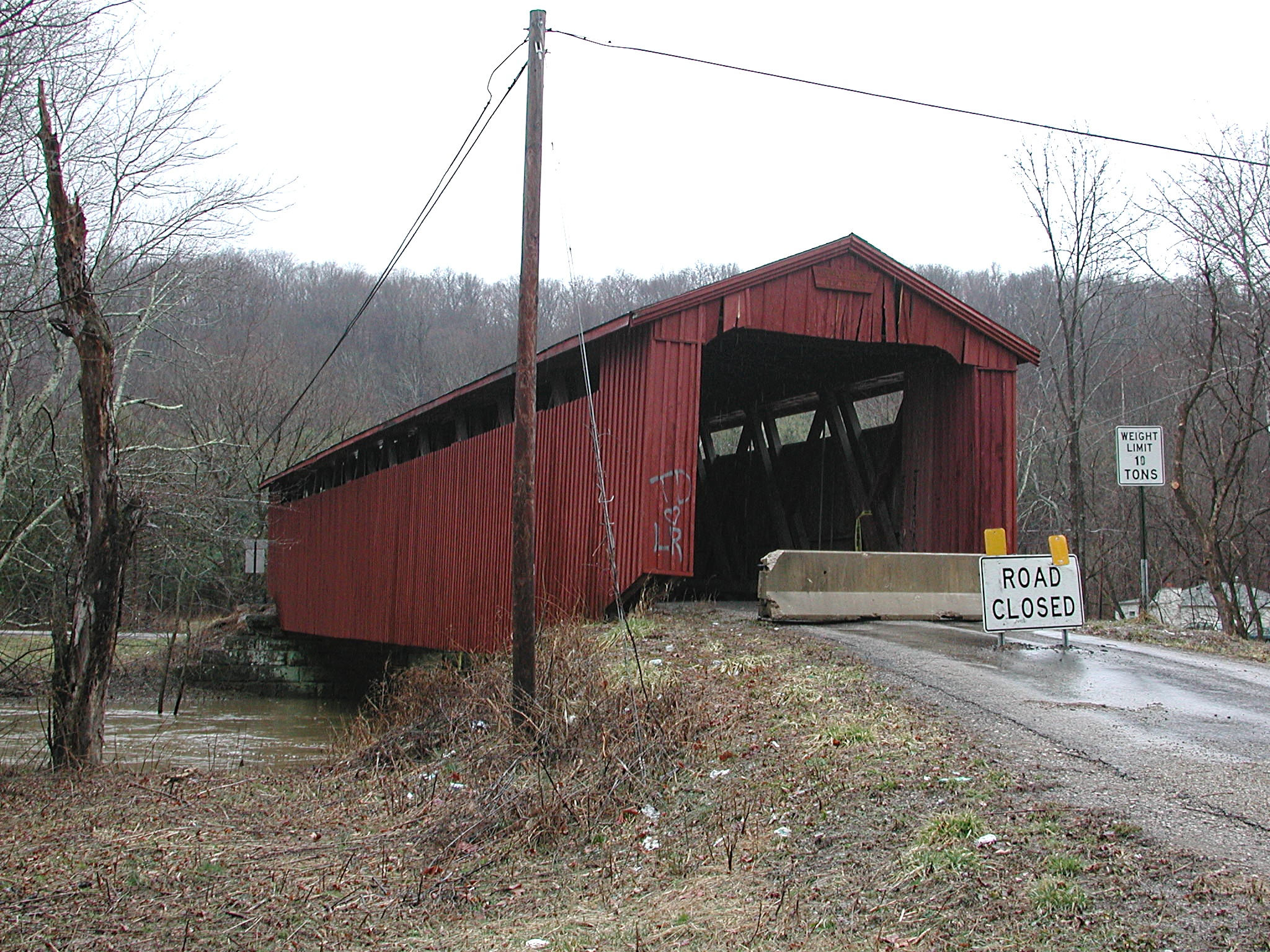
- Kidwell Covered Bridge

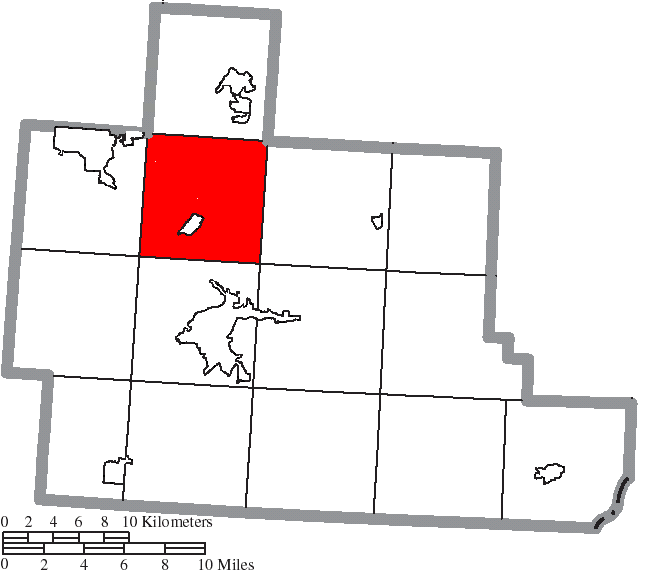
- Location of Dover Township in Athens County
- Coordinates: 39°24′53″N 82°6′55″W
- Country: United States
- State: Ohio
- County: Athens

Area
  - Total: 36.5 sq mi (94.5 km^{2})
  - Land: 36.2 sq mi (93.7 km^{2})
  - Water: 0.35 sq mi (0.9 km^{2})
- Elevation: 663 ft (202 m)

Population (2020)
  - Total: 3,387
  - Density: 93.6/sq mi (36.1/km^{2})
- Time zone: UTC-5 (Eastern (EST))
  - Summer (DST): UTC-4 (EDT)
- FIPS code: 39-22414
- GNIS feature ID: 1085754

Dover Township is one of the fourteen townships of Athens County, Ohio, United States. The 2020 census found 3,387 people in the township.

== Geography ==
Located in the northwestern part of the county, it borders the following townships:

- Trimble Township - north
- Homer Township, Morgan County - northeast corner
- Ames Township - east
- Canaan Township - southeast corner
- Athens Township - south
- Waterloo Township - southwest corner
- York Township - west
- Ward Township, Hocking County - northwest corner

Several populated places are located in Dover Township:

- The village of Chauncey, in the center
- Part of the census-designated place of The Plains, in the south
- The unincorporated community of Millfield, in the north
- The unincorporated community of Liars Corner, in the east

Much of the township is part of the Wayne National Forest.

== Name and history ==
Dover Township was organized in 1811.

Statewide, other Dover Townships are located in Fulton, Tuscarawas, and Union counties.

Coal mining has historically been important in Dover Township, which was the site of the Millfield Mine disaster of 1930.

== Government ==
The township is governed by a three-member board of trustees, who are elected in November of odd-numbered years to a four-year term beginning on the following January 1. Two are elected in the year after the presidential election and one is elected in the year before it. There is also an elected township fiscal officer, who serves a four-year term beginning on April 1 of the year after the election, which is held in November of the year before the presidential election. Vacancies in the fiscal officership or on the board of trustees are filled by the remaining trustees.
