= Pratts Fork, Ohio =

Unincorporated community in Ohio, U.S.

Coordinates: 39°11′32″N 82°01′02″W

Pratts Fork is an unincorporated community in Athens County, in the U.S. state of Ohio.

== History ==
A post office called Pratts Fork was established in 1869, and remained in operation until 1944. Beside the post office, Pratts Fork had a country store.
