= New Floodwood, Ohio =

Unincorporated community in Ohio, U.S.

Coordinates: 39°24′49″N 82°11′17″W

New Floodwood is an unincorporated community in Athens County, in the U.S. state of Ohio.

== History ==
An old variant name was Floodwood. A post office called Rock Oak was established in 1856, the name was changed to Floodwood in 1871, and the post office closed in 1883. (New) Floodwood was a mining community.
