= Athens County Public Libraries =

- 39.334521°N 82.084007°W
- Location: Athens County, Ohio
- Established: 1935
- Branches: 7

Collection
- Size: 300,000

Other information
- Director: Nick Tepe
- Website: www.myacpl.org

The Athens County Public Libraries are a consortium of seven public libraries located in Athens County, Ohio. The library system was originally known as the Nelsonville Public Library. The original facility in Nelsonville was created in 1935 as an outgrowth of the Nelsonville school system.

The library system has an inventory of about 300,000 items. In recent years, it has provided computers with Internet connections at its libraries, and this service has been shown to be very popular.

Recently, the library system has begun a landscaping program at its libraries to introduce a wider variety of plantings, especially including native trees and shrubs.

== History ==
Before the establishment of the county library the Works Progress Administration maintained twenty library stations throughout the county. These libraries usually consisted of small collections and untrained staff, but demonstrated a need in the county for a dedicated public library.

On June 1, 1935 the idea for a public library was conceived under the name The Public Library for the City of Nelsonville and Athens County. Staff from the WPA were the first librarians and various organizations and townspeople donated books to first fill the shelves. In September 1935 around a thousand books were borrowed from the State Traveling library and in December $200 donated from the State Aid for Libraries fund. Still spread across multiple WPA libraries, the entire collection moved to Washington street in 1936 allowing the hiring of a trained librarian, and the cataloging of the books under one roof.

By 1939 the library moved again and began converting the old library stations (now unused) into branch libraries. By the end of 1939 the system consisted of one library with two branches and five deposit stations. A bookmobile was also started with county budget funds which visited the county schools. In 1940 the Athens branch opened in a part of the city previously serviced by the University system.

During the 1970s through 1990s an addition three library branches were opened throughout Athens. These were the Wells library, the Coolville library, and The Plains library. With their inclusion the size of the system grew to its current seven branches.

In early 2002, the library took on a new project to implement a complete open-source integrated library system. Working with Koha, the first open-source integrated library system, the library helped develop the system from version 1 to be used for public libraries. In the fall of 2003, the library became the first public library in the United States to use an open-source integrated library system. Since then, the library has funded development, contributed over 3000 code changes, hosted Koha informational meetings, and promoted Koha at regional library conferences.

== Funding ==
Starting in 2013 the library system successfully received $17,400 in funding to begin offering bikes for student use. The program, "Book-a-Bike" allows students with a library card an alternative to taking the bus or walking to school.

== Branches ==
Today, the library system consists of these seven branches:

- Nelsonville (main branch)
- Athens
- Chauncey
- Coolville
- Glouster
- The Plains
- Wells Public Library (Albany)
