= Luhrig, Ohio =

Unincorporated community in Ohio, U.S.

Coordinates: 39°20′00″N 82°11′00″W

Luhrig is an unincorporated community in Athens County, in the U.S. state of Ohio.

== History ==
A post office called Luhrig was established in 1900, and was discontinued in 1916. Luhrig originally was a mining community; the Luhrig Coal Company operated coal mines there.
