= Utley, Ohio =

Unincorporated community in Ohio, U.S.

Coordinates: 39°23′13″N 81°54′35″W

Utley is an unincorporated community in Athens County, in the U.S. state of Ohio.

== History ==
A post office called Utley was established in 1886, and remained in operation until 1909. Utley originally was a mining community.
