= Lodi Township, Athens County, Ohio =

Township in Ohio, US

- Township
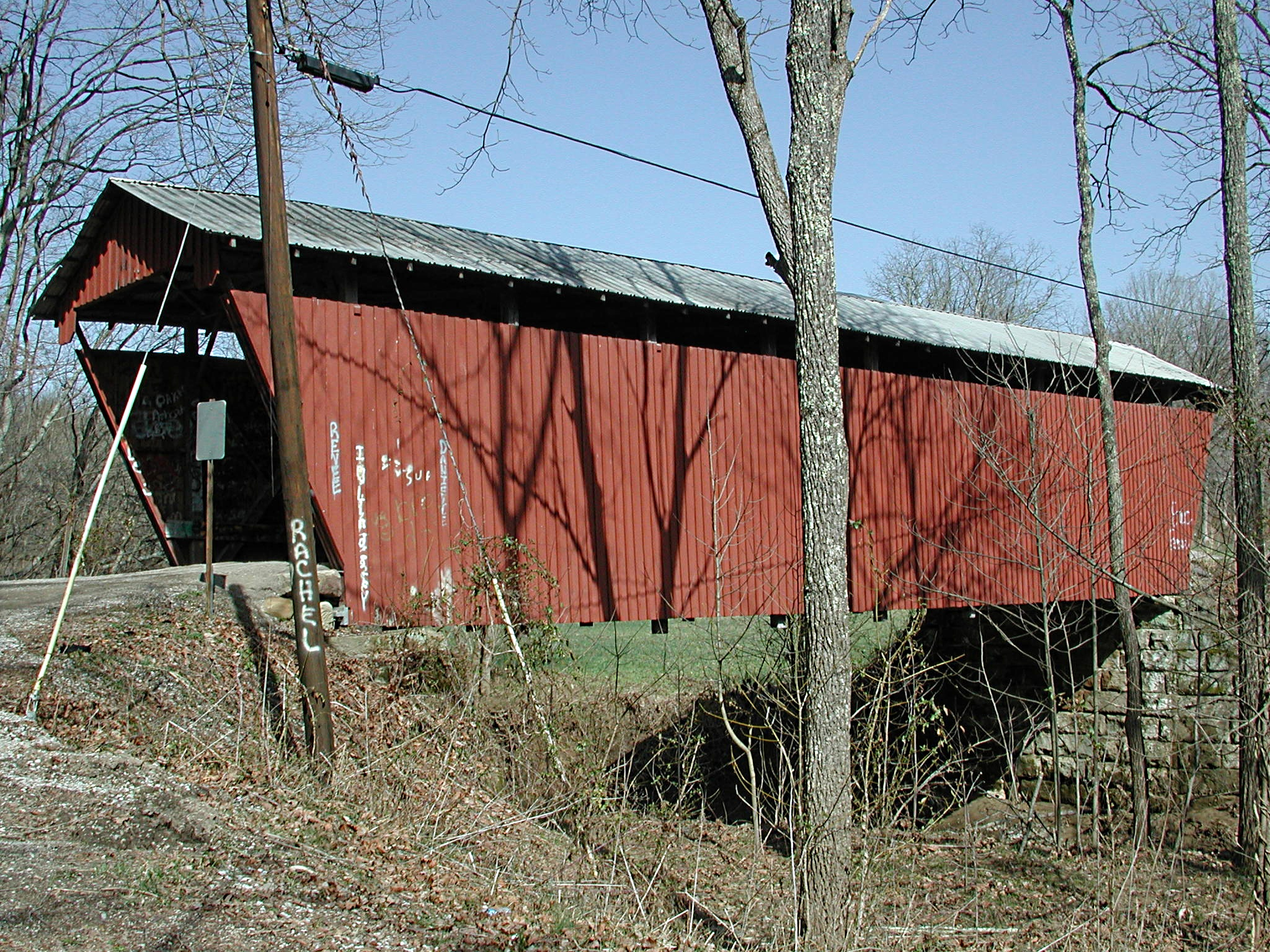
- Blackwood Covered Bridge

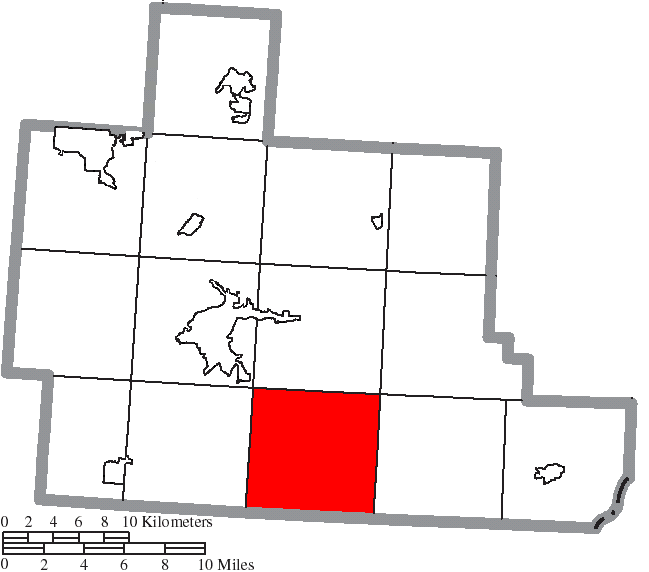
- Location of Lodi Township in Athens County
- Coordinates: 39°13′52″N 82°1′7″W
- Country: United States
- State: Ohio
- County: Athens

Area
  - Total: 39.0 sq mi (101.0 km^{2})
  - Land: 38.9 sq mi (100.7 km^{2})
  - Water: 0.077 sq mi (0.2 km^{2})
- Elevation: 692 ft (211 m)

Population (2020)
  - Total: 1,419
  - Density: 36.50/sq mi (14.09/km^{2})
- Time zone: UTC-5 (Eastern (EST))
  - Summer (DST): UTC-4 (EDT)
- FIPS code: 39-44590
- GNIS feature ID: 1085756
- Website: www.loditownship.org

Lodi Township is one of the fourteen townships of Athens County, Ohio, United States. The 2020 census found 1,419 people in the township.

== Geography ==
Located in the southern part of the county, it borders the following townships:

- Canaan Township - north
- Rome Township - northeast corner
- Carthage Township - east
- Orange Township, Meigs County - southeast corner
- Bedford Township, Meigs County - south
- Scipio Township, Meigs County - southwest corner
- Alexander Township - west
- Athens Township - northwest corner

No municipalities are located in Lodi Township.

== Name and history ==
Lodi Township was organized in 1826.

It is the only Lodi Township statewide.

== Communities served ==
- Anthony
- Garden
- Shade

== Government ==
The township is governed by a three-member board of trustees, who are elected in November of odd-numbered years to a four-year term beginning on the following January 1. Two are elected in the year after the presidential election and one is elected in the year before it. There is also an elected township clerk, who serves a four-year term beginning on April 1 of the year after the election, which is held in November of the year before the presidential election. Vacancies in the clerkship or on the board of trustees are filled by the remaining trustees.
