= Canaan Township, Athens County, Ohio =

Township in Ohio, US

- Township
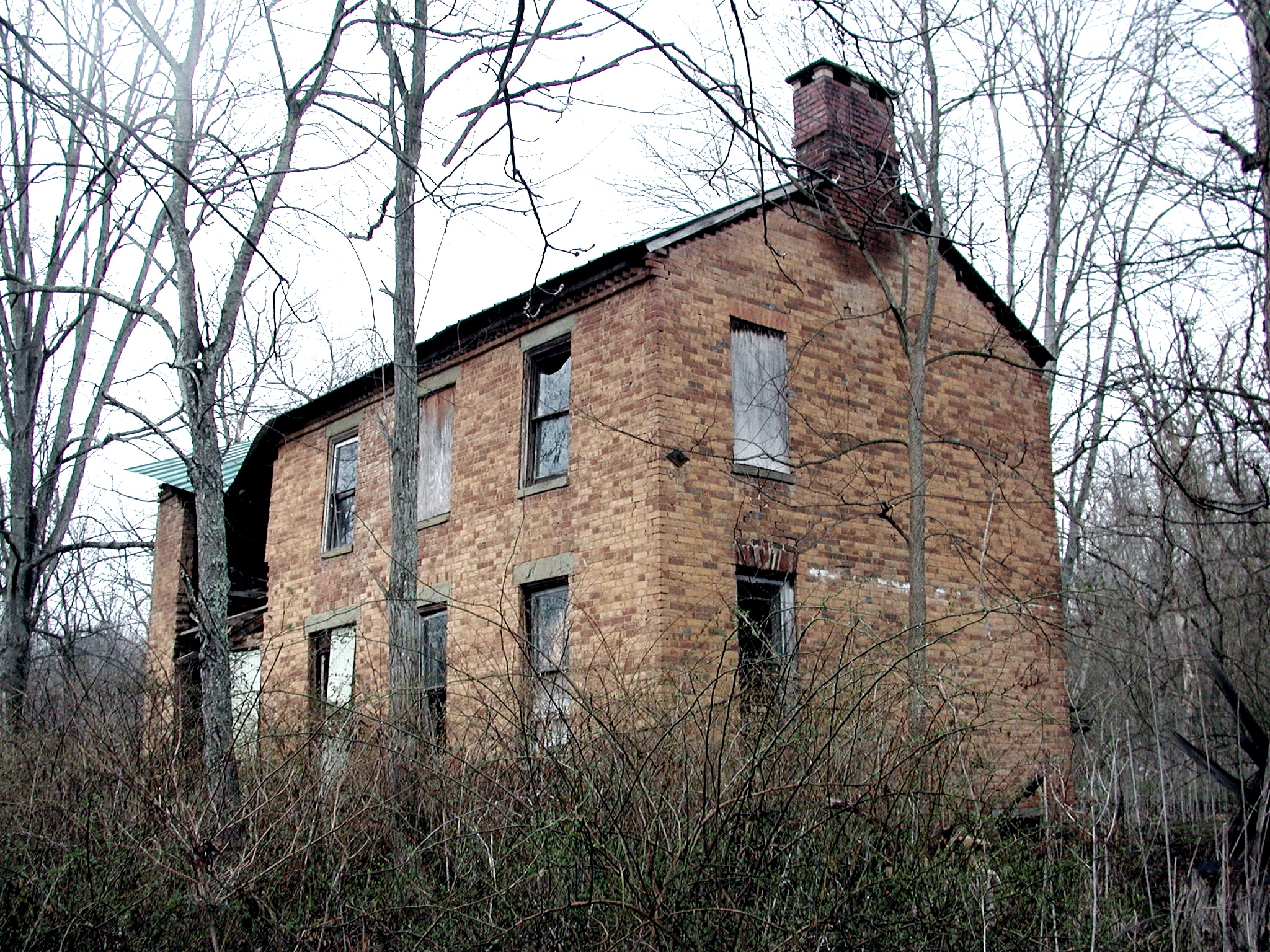
- Savage-Stewart House

- Logo

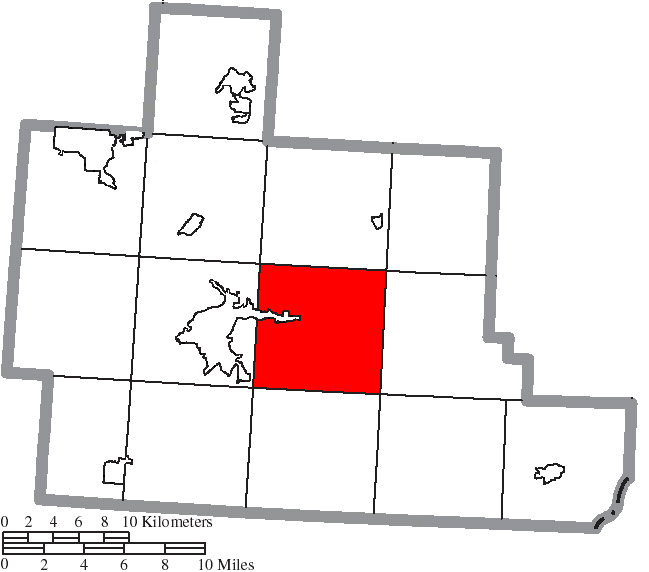
- Location of Canaan Township in Athens County
- Coordinates: 39°19′50″N 82°1′11″W
- Country: United States
- State: Ohio
- County: Athens

Area
  - Total: 38.6 sq mi (100.1 km^{2})
  - Land: 38.0 sq mi (98.5 km^{2})
  - Water: 0.62 sq mi (1.6 km^{2})
- Elevation: 620 ft (189 m)

Population (2020)
  - Total: 1,586
  - Density: 41.7/sq mi (16.1/km^{2})
- Time zone: UTC-5 (Eastern (EST))
  - Summer (DST): UTC-4 (EDT)
- FIPS code: 39-11220
- GNIS feature ID: 1085752
- Website: canaantwpathensco.org

Canaan Township is one of the fourteen townships of Athens County, Ohio, United States. The 2020 census found 1,586 people in the township.

== Geography ==
Located in the center of the county, it borders the following townships:

- Ames Township - north
- Bern Township - northeast corner
- Rome Township - east
- Carthage Township - southeast corner
- Lodi Township - south
- Alexander Township - southwest corner
- Athens Township - west
- Dover Township - northwest corner

Part of the city of Athens is located in western Canaan Township. Canaan Township contains the unincorporated community of Canaanville.

The township is bisected by the Hocking River and U.S. Route 50. It includes most of Strouds Run State Park.

== Name and history ==
Canaan Township was organized in 1819.

Statewide, other Canaan Townships are located in Madison County, Morrow County, and Wayne counties.

== Government ==
The township is governed by a three-member board of trustees, who are elected in November of odd-numbered years to a four-year term beginning on the following January 1. Two are elected in the year after the presidential election and one is elected in the year before it. There is also an elected township fiscal officer, who serves a four-year term beginning on April 1 of the year after the election, which is held in November of the year before the presidential election. Vacancies in the fiscal officership or on the board of trustees are filled by the remaining trustees.
