= Burr Oak, Ohio =

- Unincorporated community
- Location within Ohio Location within the United States
- Coordinates: 39°33′03″N 82°03′50″W
- Country: United States
- State: Ohio
- County: Athens
- Elevation: 725 ft (221 m)
- Time zone: UTC-5 (Eastern (EST))
  - Summer (DST): UTC-4 (EDT)
- Area code: 740
- GNIS feature ID: 1075490

Burr Oak is an unincorporated community in Athens County, Ohio, United States. Burr Oak is located on Ohio State Route 13, 3.5 miles (5.6 km) north-northeast of Glouster. Burr Oak State Park is within walking distance and is named after the community.

== History ==
A post office called Burr Oak was established in 1887, and remained in operation until 1911. The community was named for burr oak trees near the original town site.
