= Rome Township, Athens County, Ohio =

Township in Ohio, US

- Township
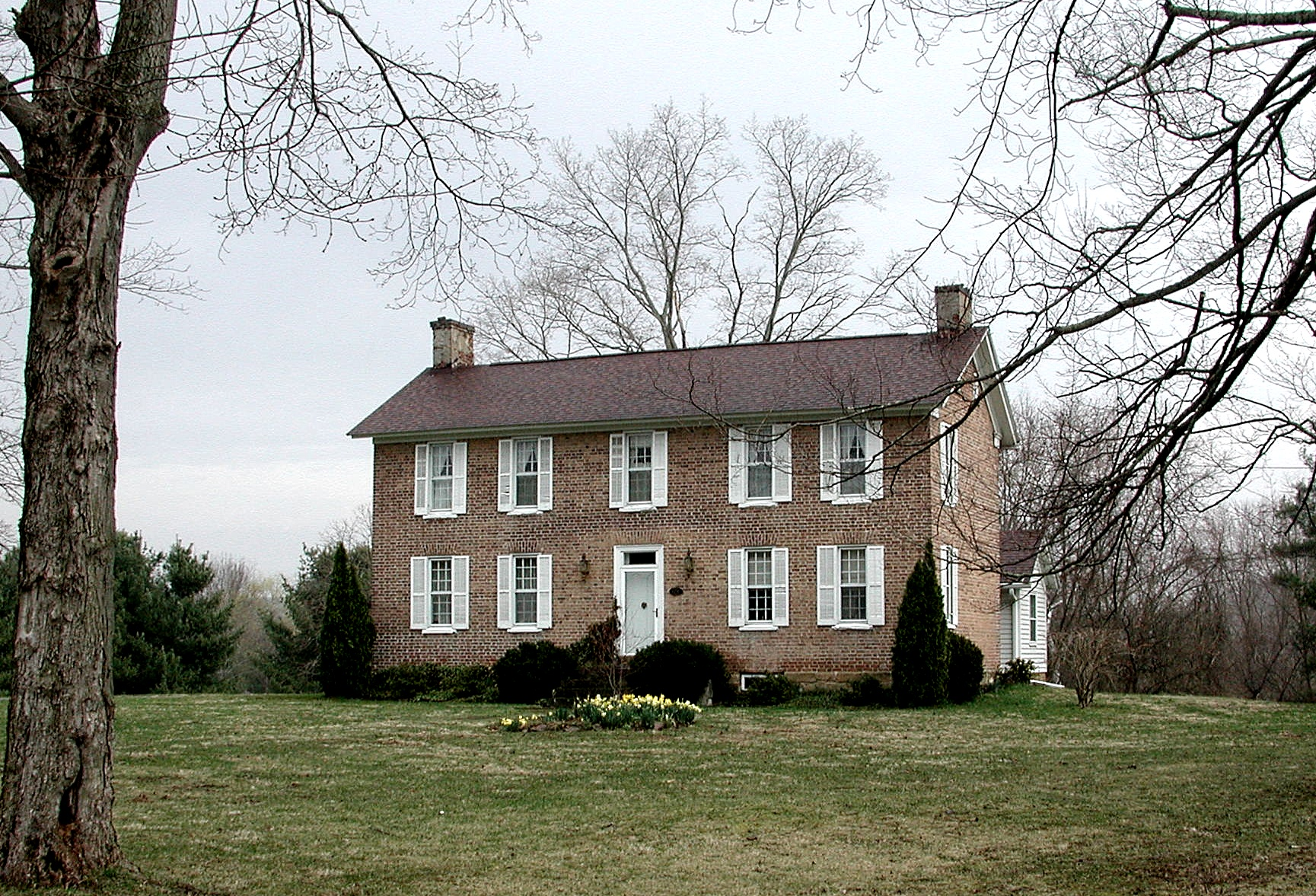
- Federalton, built 1817

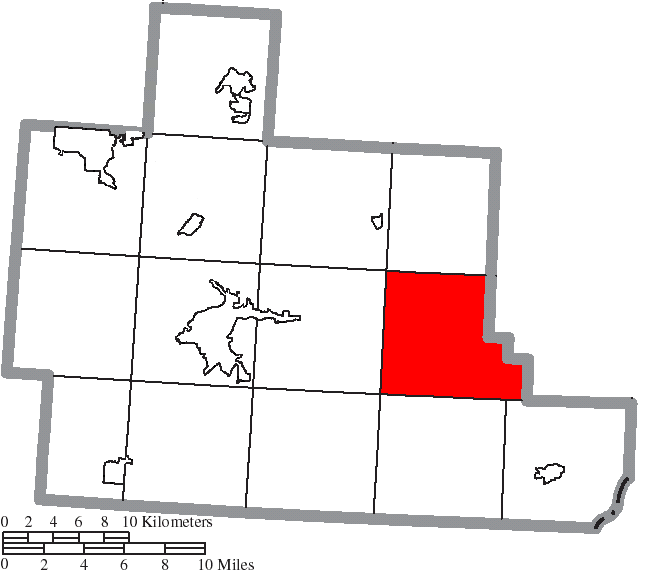
- Location of Rome Township in Athens County
- Coordinates: 39°18′29″N 81°53′24″W
- Country: United States
- State: Ohio
- County: Athens

Area
  - Total: 37.1 sq mi (96.0 km^{2})
  - Land: 36.5 sq mi (94.6 km^{2})
  - Water: 0.54 sq mi (1.4 km^{2})
- Elevation: 666 ft (203 m)

Population (2020)
  - Total: 1,251
  - Density: 34.3/sq mi (13.2/km^{2})
- Time zone: UTC-5 (Eastern (EST))
  - Summer (DST): UTC-4 (EDT)
- FIPS code: 39-68238
- GNIS feature ID: 1085757
- Website: https://rometownshipathcooh.gov

Rome Township is one of the fourteen townships of Athens County, Ohio, United States. The 2020 census found 1,251 people in the township.

== Geography ==
Located in the eastern part of the county, it borders the following townships:

- Bern Township - north
- Wesley Township, Washington County - northeast corner
- Decatur Township, Washington County - east
- Troy Township - southeast corner
- Carthage Township - south
- Lodi Township - southwest corner
- Canaan Township - west
- Ames Township - northwest corner

No municipalities are located in Rome Township, although three unincorporated communities lie in the township: Guysville in the south, New England in the northwest, and Stewart in the center.

== Name and history ==
Rome Township was established in 1811.

Statewide, other Rome Townships are located in Ashtabula and Lawrence counties.

In 1833, Rome Township had a store and several mills.

== Government ==
The township is governed by a three-member board of trustees, who are elected in November of odd-numbered years to a four-year term beginning on the following January 1. Two are elected in the year after the presidential election and one is elected in the year before it. There is also an elected township fiscal officer, who serves a four-year term beginning on April 1 of the year after the election, which is held in November of the year before the presidential election. Vacancies in the fiscal officership or on the board of trustees are filled by the remaining trustees.
