= The Plains, Ohio =

- Census-designated place
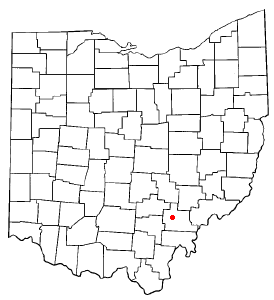
- Location of The Plains, Ohio
- Coordinates: 39°22′13″N 82°07′56″W
- Country: United States
- State: Ohio
- County: Athens
- Townships: Athens, Dover

Area
  - Total: 2.29 sq mi (5.92 km^{2})
  - Land: 2.28 sq mi (5.90 km^{2})
  - Water: 0.0077 sq mi (0.02 km^{2})
- Elevation: 719 ft (219 m)

Population (2020)
  - Total: 3,140
  - Density: 1,377.3/sq mi (531.79/km^{2})
- Time zone: UTC-5 (Eastern (EST))
  - Summer (DST): UTC-4 (EDT)
- ZIP code: 45780
- Area code: 740
- FIPS code: 39-76568
- GNIS feature ID: 2393256

The Plains is a census-designated place (CDP) in Athens County, Ohio, United States. The population was 3,140 at the 2020 census.

== History ==
"The Plains" originally referred to the local region where the Mound Builders lived and built their signature Indian mounds. A post office called The Plains has been in operation since 1908.

== Geography ==
According to the United States Census Bureau, the CDP has a total area of 2.3 square miles (5.9 km^{2}), of which 0.0077 square miles (0.02 km^{2}), or 0.28%, is water.

=== Open space ===
A nature preserve was created in The Plains recently by the Athens Conservancy. An extension of the Hockhocking Adena Bikeway is planned to traverse the preserve and provide bikeway access for the community.

== Demographics ==
Historical population
| Census | Pop. | Note | %± |
|---|---|---|---|
| 2000 | 2,931 | | — |
| 2010 | 3,080 | | 5.1% |
| 2020 | 3,140 | | 1.9% |
U.S. Decennial Census

=== 2020 census ===
As of the 2020 census, The Plains had a population of 3,140. The median age was 42.0 years. 18.4% of residents were under the age of 18 and 21.6% of residents were 65 years of age or older. For every 100 females there were 86.9 males, and for every 100 females age 18 and over there were 84.1 males age 18 and over.

95.7% of residents lived in urban areas, while 4.3% lived in rural areas.

There were 1,473 households in The Plains, of which 20.8% had children under the age of 18 living in them. Of all households, 29.6% were married-couple households, 22.4% were households with a male householder and no spouse or partner present, and 38.8% were households with a female householder and no spouse or partner present. About 44.2% of all households were made up of individuals and 18.7% had someone living alone who was 65 years of age or older.

There were 1,596 housing units, of which 7.7% were vacant. The homeowner vacancy rate was 1.5% and the rental vacancy rate was 5.4%.

Racial composition as of the 2020 census
| Race | Number | Percent |
|---|---|---|
| White | 2,764 | 88.0% |
| Black or African American | 118 | 3.8% |
| American Indian and Alaska Native | 9 | 0.3% |
| Asian | 32 | 1.0% |
| Native Hawaiian and Other Pacific Islander | 0 | 0.0% |
| Some other race | 28 | 0.9% |
| Two or more races | 189 | 6.0% |
| Hispanic or Latino (of any race) | 34 | 1.1% |

=== 2000 census ===
At the 2000 census there were 2,931 people, 1,224 households, and 714 families in the CDP. The population density was 1,275.8 inhabitants per square mile (492.6/km^{2}). There were 1,344 housing units at an average density of 585.0 per square mile (225.9/km^{2}). The racial makeup of the CDP was 94.13% White, 2.42% African American, 0.31% Native American, 1.09% Asian, 0.27% from other races, and 1.77% from two or more races. Hispanic or Latino of any race were 0.82%.

Of the 1,224 households 29.0% had children under the age of 18 living with them, 41.0% were married couples living together, 14.0% had a female householder with no husband present, and 41.6% were non-families. 33.9% of households were one person and 11.6% were one person aged 65 or older. The average household size was 2.24 and the average family size was 2.88.

The age distribution was 23.5% under the age of 18, 10.4% from 18 to 24, 28.1% from 25 to 44, 19.4% from 45 to 64, and 18.5% 65 or older. The median age was 36 years. For every 100 females, there were 80.0 males. For every 100 females age 18 and over, there were 72.5 males.

The median household income was $30,102 and the median family income was $44,761. Males had a median income of $26,687 versus $25,106 for females. The per capita income for the CDP was $17,164. About 13.3% of families and 17.7% of the population were below the poverty line, including 18.9% of those under age 18 and 14.8% of those age 65 or over.

== Arts and culture ==
The Plains is known for its history of Native American burial mounds and ceremonial circles. Nearly 25 mounds were identified here, and the complex has been listed on the National Register of Historic Places. These are collectively known as the Wolf Plains Mound Group. The Archaeological Conservancy has been buying the sites of the mounds to protect them from development.

== Education ==
=== Public schools ===
The residents of The Plains are served by the Athens City School District and Athens High School.

=== Public libraries ===
The Plains has a public library, a branch of the Athens County Public Libraries.

== Notable people ==
Joe Burrow, football player for the Cincinnati Bengals, went to Athens High School and his family moved to The Plains when he was nine years old.
