= Hamley Run, Ohio =

Unincorporated community in Ohio, U.S.

Coordinates: 39°23′51″N 82°10′10″W

Hamley Run is an unincorporated community in Athens County, in the U.S. state of Ohio.

== History ==
A post office was established at Hamley Run in 1890, and remained in operation until 1894. Hamley Run originally was a mining community.
