= Beaumont, Ohio =

Unincorporated community in Ohio, U.S.

Coordinates: 39°23′08″N 82°08′18″W

Beaumont is an unincorporated community in Athens County, in the U.S. state of Ohio.

== History ==
A post office called Beaumont was established in 1894, and remained in operation until 1908. The "finest group" of Indian mounds in the area were said to be located near Beaumont.
