= Waterloo Wildlife Research Station =

Wildlife area in Ohio, United States

- IUCN category V (protected landscape/seascape)
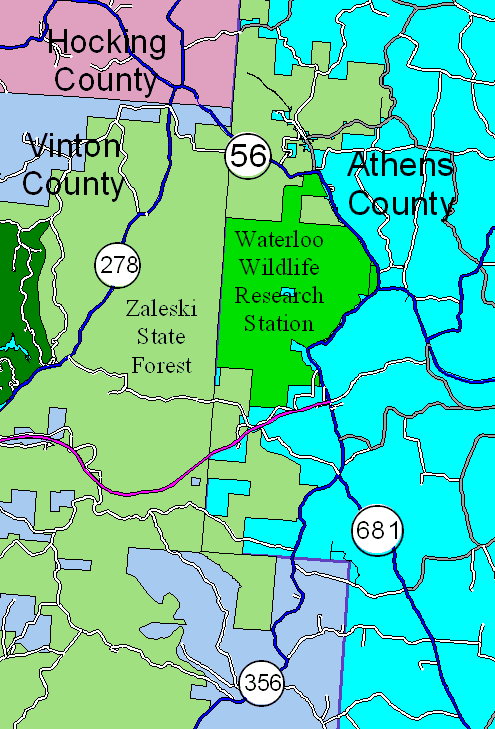

- Location within Ohio Location within the United States
- Location: Athens County, Ohio
- Nearest city: Athens, OH
- Coordinates: 39.344°N 82.257°W
- Area: 2,937 acres (11.89 km^{2})
- Established: 1944

The Waterloo Wildlife Research Station is a 2,937-acre (11.89 km^{2}) Ohio state wildlife area located in western Waterloo Township, Athens County, Ohio. Purchase for the area was begun in 1944. The area was greatly expanded in 2005 when 945 acres were added. It was originally named the Waterloo Wildlife Experiment Station. Research was done there over a period of years, until recently.

== Location ==
The area is surrounded on three sides by the Zaleski State Forest, and Ohio State Route 356, and Ohio State Route 56 forms the border for the fourth (east) side. The entrance to the wildlife area is off Route 356 immediately south of its junction with Route 56. The wildlife area is drained by Hewett Fork, a principal tributary to Raccoon Creek.

A turkey management area of more than 5,000 acres is located partly in this wildlife area, and partly in the adjacent state forest.

This facility has an extensive system of short hiking trails, largely based on old fire roads. However, these are no longer actively maintained.

== Waterloo Aquatic Education Center ==
The principal building of the site is now the Waterloo Aquatic Education Center, operated by the Raccoon Creek Water-Trail Association.
