= Bessemer, Ohio =

Unincorporated community in Ohio, U.S.

Coordinates: 39°27′54″N 82°11′53″W

Bessemer is an unincorporated community in Athens County, in the U.S. state of Ohio.

== History ==
A post office called Bessemer was established in 1877, and remained in operation until 1879. Bessemer was historically a mining community.
