= Alexander Township, Ohio =

Township in Ohio, US

Alexander Township, Athens County, Ohio
- Township
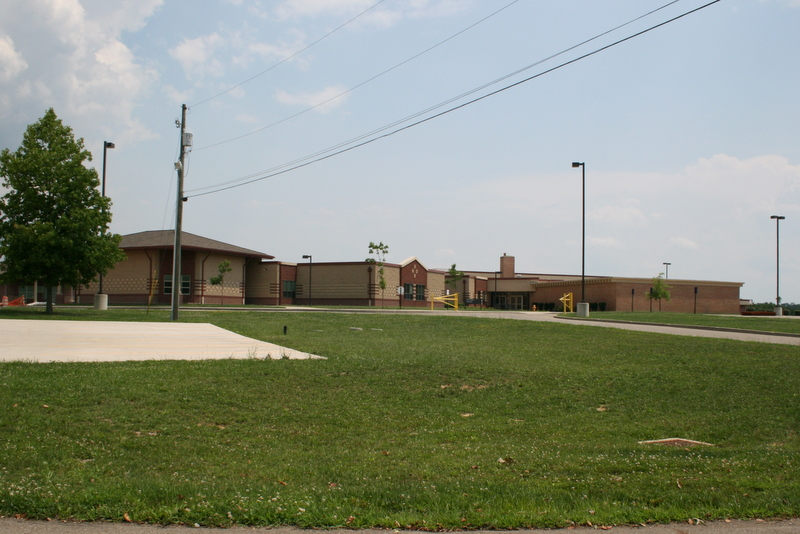
- Alexander High School

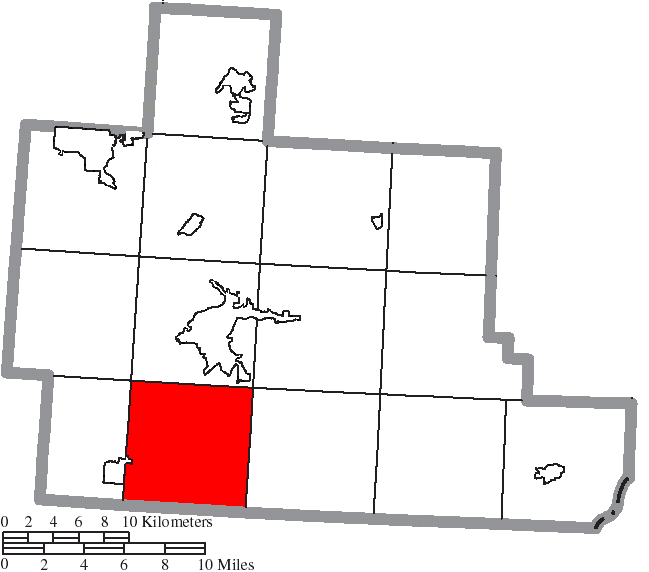
- Location of Alexander Township in Athens County
- Coordinates: 39°14′28″N 82°9′18″W
- Country: United States
- State: Ohio
- County: Athens

Area
  - Total: 37.4 sq mi (96.8 km^{2})
  - Land: 37.1 sq mi (96.0 km^{2})
  - Water: 0.31 sq mi (0.8 km^{2})
- Elevation: 830 ft (253 m)

Population (2020)
  - Total: 2,801
  - Density: 76/sq mi (29.3/km^{2})
- Time zone: UTC-5 (Eastern (EST))
  - Summer (DST): UTC-4 (EDT)
- FIPS code: 39-01112
- GNIS feature ID: 1085748

Alexander Township is one of the fourteen townships of Athens County, Ohio, United States. The 2020 census found 2,801 people in the township.

== Geography ==
Located in the southwestern part of the county, it borders the following townships:

- Athens Township - north
- Canaan Township - northeast corner
- Lodi Township - east
- Bedford Township, Meigs County - southeast corner
- Scipio Township, Meigs County - south
- Columbia Township, Meigs County - southwest corner
- Lee Township - west
- Waterloo Township - northwest corner

A small part of the village of Albany is located in southwestern Alexander Township. Alexander Township contains the unincorporated community of Pleasanton.

== Name and history ==
It is the only Alexander Township statewide.

== Government ==
The township is governed by a three-member board of trustees, who are elected in November of odd-numbered years to a four-year term beginning on the following January 1. Two are elected in the year after the presidential election and one is elected in the year before it. There is also an elected township fiscal officer, who serves a four-year term beginning on April 1 of the year after the election, which is held in November of the year before the presidential election. Vacancies in the fiscal officership or on the board of trustees are filled by the remaining trustees.
