= Hebardville, Ohio =

Unincorporated community in Ohio, U.S.

Coordinates: 39°15′12″N 82°10′05″W

Hebardville is an unincorporated community in Athens County, in the U.S. state of Ohio.

== History ==
A variant name is Hebbardsville. A post office called Hebbardsville was established in 1832, and remained in operation until 1918. In 1883, Hebbardsville had about 100 residents.
