= Carthage Township, Ohio =

Township in Ohio, US

Carthage Township, Athens County, Ohio
- Township
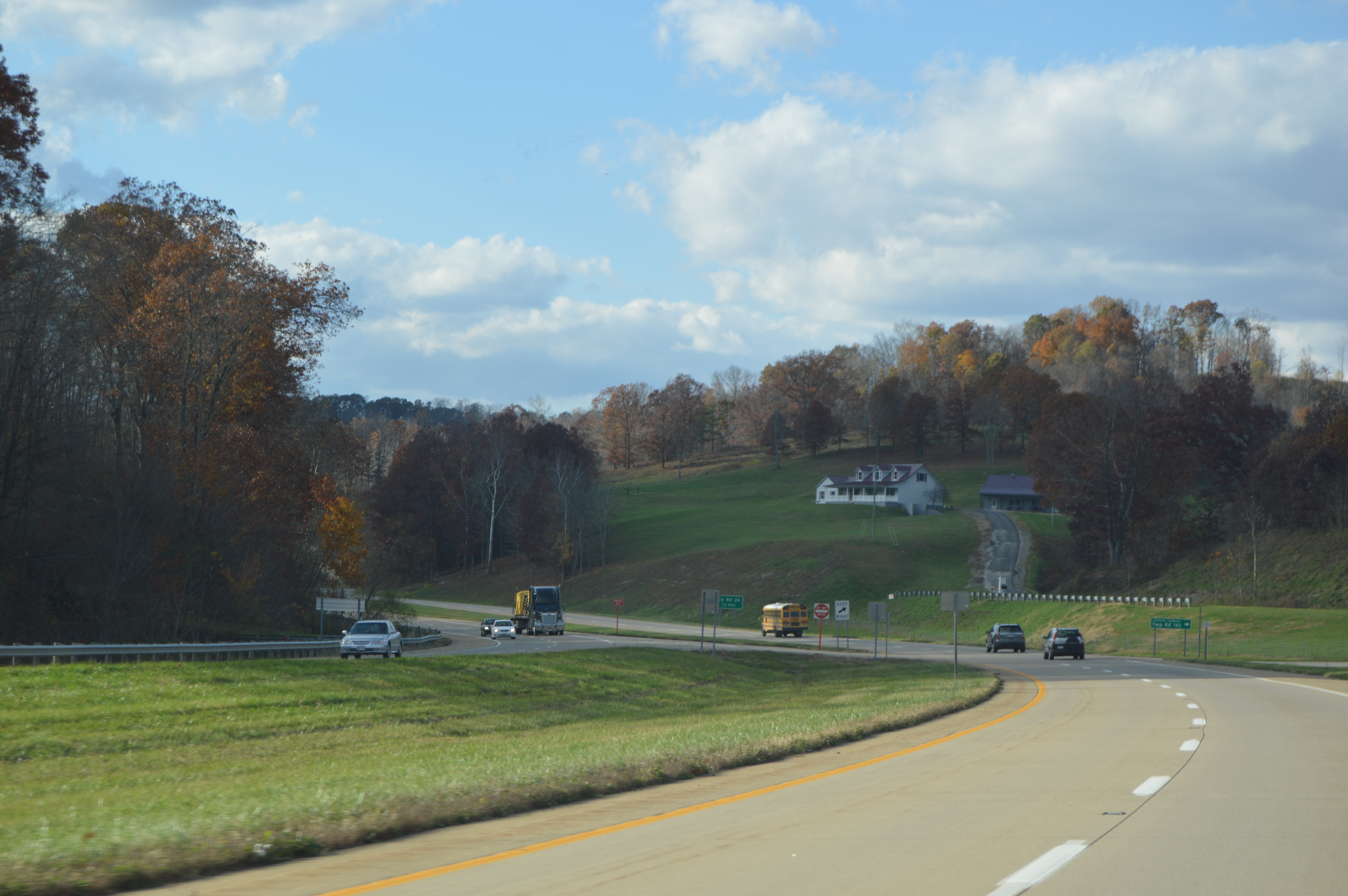
- U.S. Route 50/State Route 32 just south of Guysville

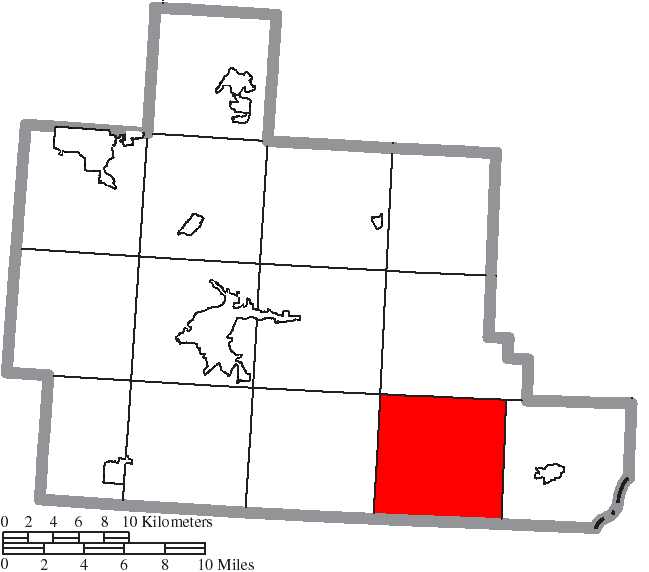
- Location of Carthage Township in Athens County
- Coordinates: 39°14′16″N 81°53′39″W
- Country: United States
- State: Ohio
- County: Athens

Area
  - Total: 38.6 sq mi (100.0 km^{2})
  - Land: 38.5 sq mi (99.8 km^{2})
  - Water: 0.077 sq mi (0.2 km^{2})
- Elevation: 860 ft (262 m)

Population (2020)
  - Total: 1,459
  - Density: 37.9/sq mi (14.6/km^{2})
- Time zone: UTC-5 (Eastern (EST))
  - Summer (DST): UTC-4 (EDT)
- FIPS code: 39-12336
- GNIS feature ID: 1085753

Carthage Township is one of the fourteen townships of Athens County, Ohio, United States. The 2020 census found 1,459 people in the township.

== Geography ==
Located in the southeastern part of the county, it borders the following townships:

- Rome Township - north
- Troy Township - east
- Olive Township, Meigs County - southeast corner
- Orange Township, Meigs County - south
- Bedford Township, Meigs County - southwest corner
- Lodi Township - west
- Canaan Township - northwest corner

No municipalities are located in Carthage Township, although the unincorporated community of Lottridge lies in the township's center.

== Name and history ==
Carthage Township was organized in 1819.

It is the only Carthage Township statewide.

== Government ==
The township is governed by a three-member board of trustees, who are elected in November of odd-numbered years to a four-year term beginning on the following January 1. Two are elected in the year after the presidential election and one is elected in the year before it. There is also an elected township fiscal officer, who serves a four-year term beginning on April 1 of the year after the election, which is held in November of the year before the presidential election. Vacancies in the fiscal officership or on the board of trustees are filled by the remaining trustees.
