= Athens Township, Athens County, Ohio =

Township in Ohio, US

Athens Township
- Township
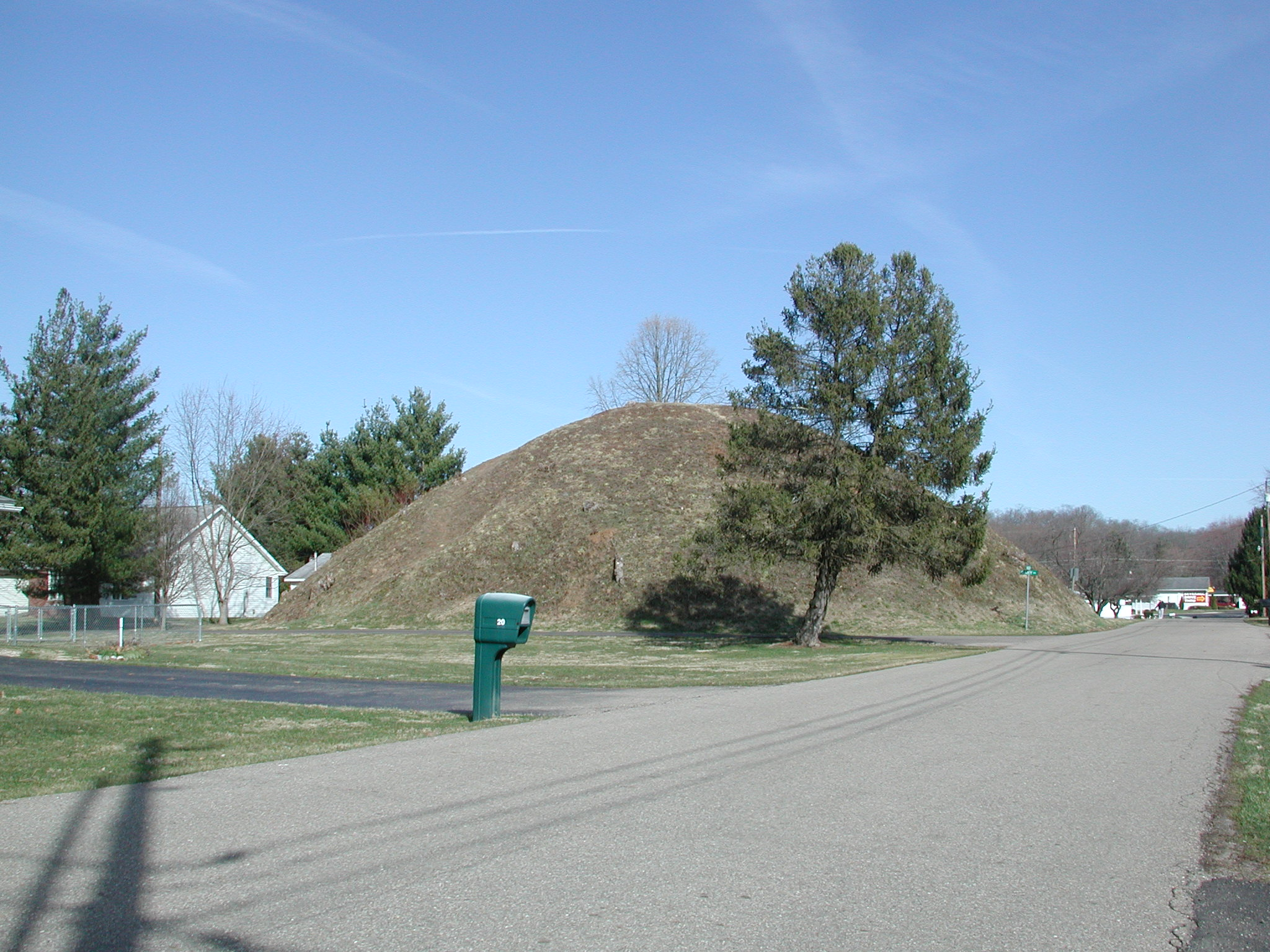
- Adena Indian mounds at The Plains

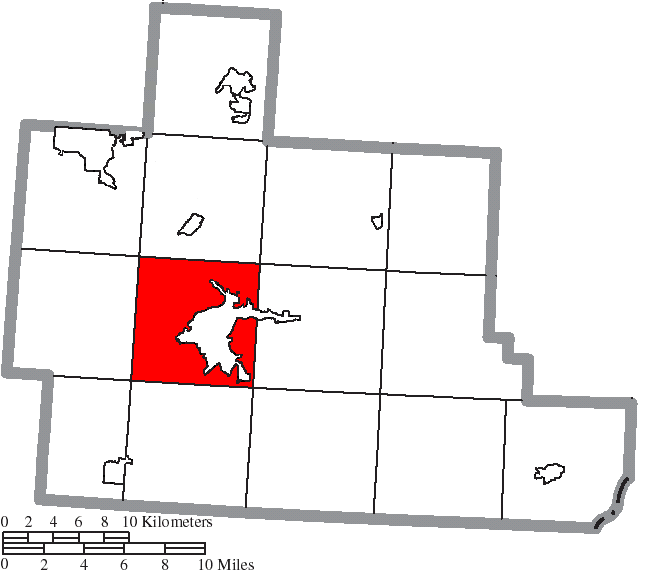
- Location of Athens Township in Athens County
- Coordinates: 39°20′4″N 82°6′40″W
- Country: United States
- State: Ohio
- County: Athens

Area
  - Total: 37.1 sq mi (96.0 km^{2})
  - Land: 36.6 sq mi (94.7 km^{2})
  - Water: 0.46 sq mi (1.2 km^{2})
- Elevation: 636 ft (194 m)

Population (2020)
  - Total: 30,163
  - Density: 833/sq mi (321.7/km^{2})
- Time zone: UTC-5 (Eastern (EST))
  - Summer (DST): UTC-4 (EDT)
- ZIP code: 45701
- Area code: 740
- FIPS code: 39-02750
- GNIS feature ID: 1085750
- Website: athenstwp.com

Athens Township is one of the fourteen townships of Athens County, Ohio, United States. The 2020 census found 30,163 people in the township.

== Geography ==
Located in the western part of the county, it borders the following townships:

- Dover Township – north
- Ames Township – northeast corner
- Canaan Township – east
- Lodi Township – southeast corner
- Alexander Township – south
- Lee Township – southwest corner
- Waterloo Township – west
- York Township – northwest corner

Most of the city of Athens, the county seat of Athens County, is located in central and eastern Athens Township, and the census-designated place of The Plains is located in northern Athens Township.

== Name and history ==
Athens Township was organized in 1805.

Statewide, the only other Athens Township is located in Harrison County.

== Government ==
The township is governed by a three-member board of trustees, who are elected in November of odd-numbered years to a four-year term beginning on the following January 1. Two are elected in the year after the presidential election and one is elected in the year before it. There is also an elected township fiscal officer, who serves a four-year term beginning on April 1 of the year after the election, which is held in November of the year before the presidential election. Vacancies in the fiscal officership or on the board of trustees are filled by the remaining trustees.
