= Big Run, Ohio =

Unincorporated community in Ohio, U.S.

Coordinates: 39°21′19″N 81°52′21″W

Big Run is an unincorporated community in Athens County, in the U.S. state of Ohio.

== History ==
A post office called Big Run was established in 1856, and remained in operation until 1907. The community took its name from nearby Big Run creek. Besides the post office, Big Run had a railroad station (on the Marietta and Cincinnati Railroad) and a country store.
