= Lottridge, Ohio =

Coordinates: 39°13′38″N 81°53′50″W

Lottridge is an unincorporated community in Athens County, Ohio, United States.

== History ==
A post office called Lottridge was established in 1850, and remained in operation until 1907.
