= Chauncey, Ohio =

- Village
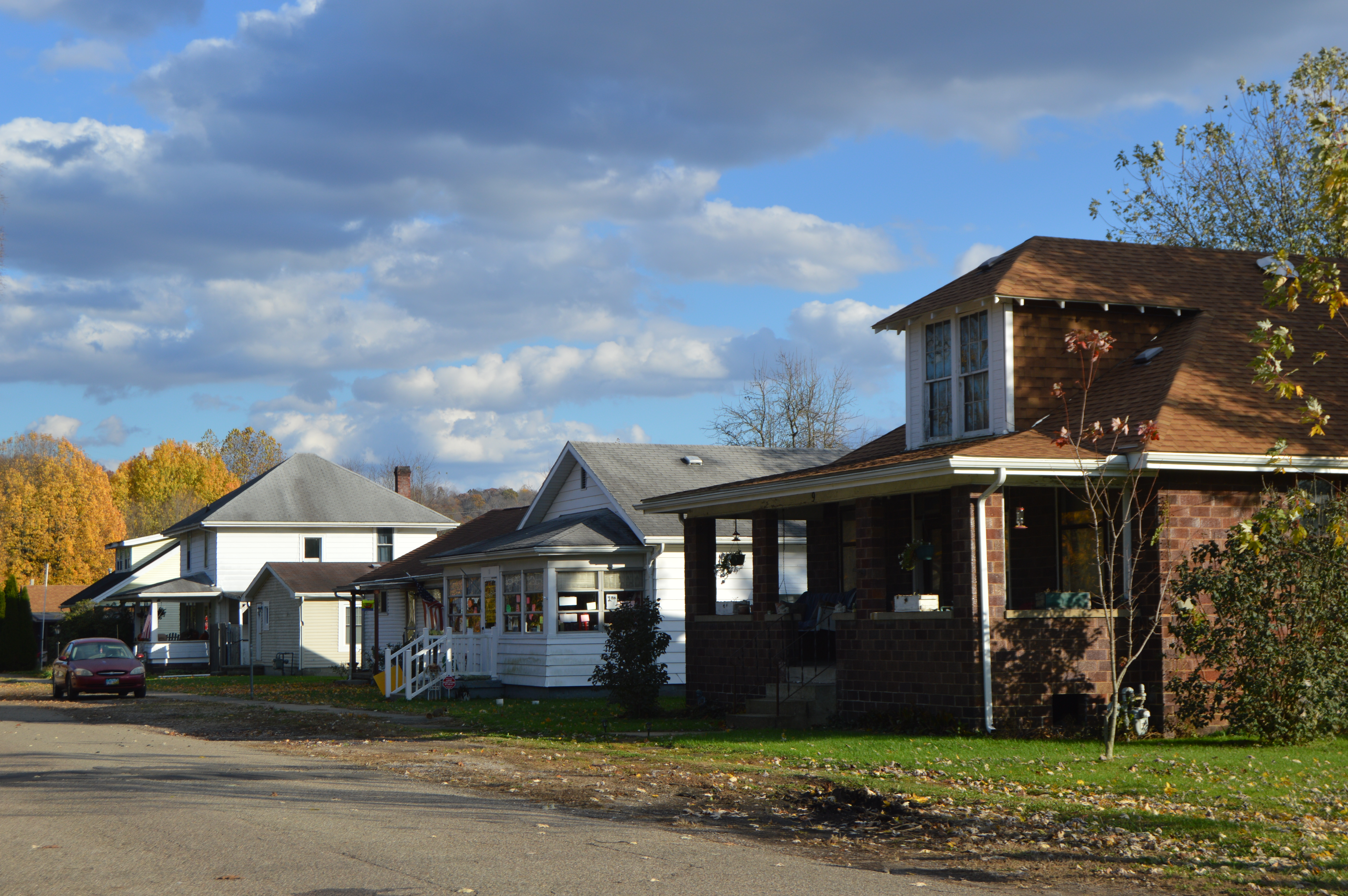
- Jacobs Street houses

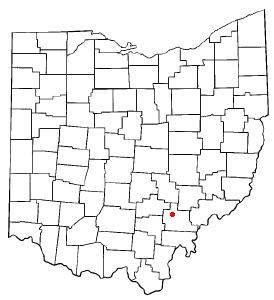
- Location of Chauncey, Ohio

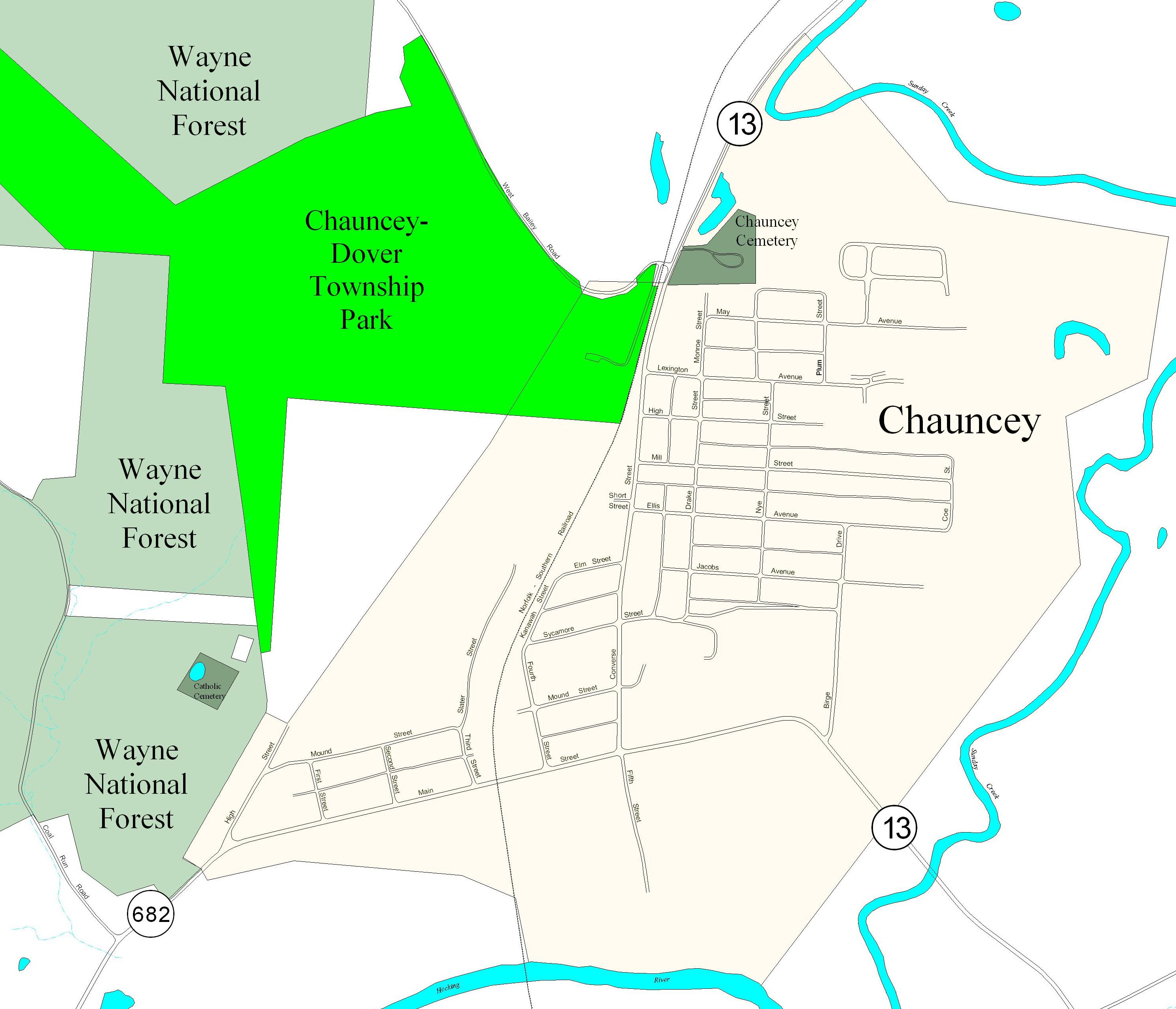
- Street map of Chauncey
- Coordinates: 39°24′06″N 82°07′28″W
- Country: United States
- State: Ohio
- County: Athens
- Township: Dover

Area
  - Total: 0.55 sq mi (1.43 km^{2})
  - Land: 0.55 sq mi (1.43 km^{2})
  - Water: 0 sq mi (0.00 km^{2})
- Elevation: 659 ft (201 m)

Population (2020)
  - Total: 959
  - Estimate (2023): 944
  - Density: 1,742.9/sq mi (672.93/km^{2})
- Time zone: UTC-5 (Eastern (EST))
  - Summer (DST): UTC-4 (EDT)
- ZIP code: 45719
- Area code: 740
- FIPS code: 39-13778
- GNIS feature ID: 2397608
- Website: villageofchauncey.com

Chauncey (/ˈtʃænsi/ CHAN-see) is a village in Dover Township, Athens County, Ohio, United States. The population was 959 at the 2020 census.

== Geography ==
Chauncey is located at 39.401984°N 82.131313°W. According to the United States Census Bureau, the village has a total area of 0.56 square miles (1.45 km^{2}), all land.

Situated near the confluence of Sunday Creek and the Hocking River, Chauncey has long been vulnerable to flooding. In response, parts of the low-lying land have been converted into green spaces and parkland, including recent conservation efforts along the creek.

== History ==
Chauncey was laid out in 1839, and named after Elihu Chauncey, a partner in a firm that owned several local salt springs. A post office called Chauncey has been in operation since 1838.

The village became an early hub for salt production, but by the late 19th century, its economy shifted toward deep coal mining along Sunday Creek. Chauncey’s population grew alongside the coal industry, drawing workers from across Appalachia.

In 1932, striking miners opposed wage cuts imposed by the New York Coal Company and sabotaged a section of track near Mine #25. The National Guard was deployed. One miner was killed, and several were injured — an incident that became known locally as the “Chauncey War.”

In 2022, a state historical marker was placed in honor of the "Chauncey Boys" — three local men who served in the Union Army during the Civil War, two of whom are buried in Nye Cemetery.

== Demographics ==
Historical population
Census	Pop.	Note	%±
1870	201		—
1880	185		−8.0%
1910	821		—
1920	1,178		43.5%
1930	1,269		7.7%
1940	1,234		−2.8%
1950	1,016		−17.7%
1960	996		−2.0%
1970	1,117		12.1%
1980	1,050		−6.0%
1990	980		−6.7%
2000	1,067		8.9%
2010	1,049		−1.7%
2020	959		−8.6%
2023 (est.)	944	▼	−1.6%
U.S. Decennial Census

=== 2010 census ===
As of the census of 2010, there were 1,049 people, 423 households, and 262 families living in the village. The population density was 1,589.4 inhabitants per square mile (613.7/km^{2}). There were 477 housing units at an average density of 722.7 per square mile (279.0/km^{2}). The racial makeup of the village was 96.6% White, 0.9% African American, 0.3% Native American, 0.4% Asian, 0.1% Pacific Islander, 0.1% from other races, and 1.7% from two or more races. Hispanic or Latino of any race were 0.6% of the population.

There were 423 households, of which 30.5% had children under the age of 18 living with them, 39.0% were married couples living together, 16.5% had a female householder with no husband present, 6.4% had a male householder with no wife present, and 38.1% were non-families. 29.6% of all households were made up of individuals, and 9.7% had someone living alone who was 65 years of age or older. The average household size was 2.48 and the average family size was 3.00.

The median age in the village was 37.4 years. 24.2% of residents were under the age of 18; 10.9% were between the ages of 18 and 24; 24.8% were from 25 to 44; 26.9% were from 45 to 64; and 13.3% were 65 years of age or older. The gender makeup of the village was 50.4% male and 49.6% female.

=== 2000 census ===
As of the census of 2000, there were 1,067 people, 431 households, and 286 families living in the village. The population density was 1,592.1 inhabitants per square mile (614.7/km^{2}). There were 483 housing units at an average density of 720.7 per square mile (278.3/km^{2}). The racial makeup of the village was 93.72% White, 1.59% African American, 0.09% Native American, 2.62% Asian, and 1.97% from two or more races. Hispanic or Latino of any race were 0.94% of the population.

There were 431 households, out of which 32.5% had children under the age of 18 living with them, 46.4% were married couples living together, 14.8% had a female householder with no husband present, and 33.6% were non-families. 28.1% of all households were made up of individuals, and 10.7% had someone living alone who was 65 years of age or older. The average household size was 2.48 and the average family size was 3.01.

In the village, the population was spread out, with 26.5% under the age of 18, 8.2% from 18 to 24, 32.5% from 25 to 44, 21.1% from 45 to 64, and 11.6% who were 65 years of age or older. The median age was 34 years. For every 100 females there were 90.2 males. For every 100 females age 18 and over, there were 87.1 males.

The median income for a household in the village was $24,821, and the median income for a family was $30,865. Males had a median income of $28,750 versus $20,536 for females. The per capita income for the village was $12,052. About 21.8% of families and 25.6% of the population were below the poverty line, including 33.3% of those under age 18 and 19.7% of those age 65 or over.

== Demographics ==
Historical population
Census	Pop.	Note	%±
1880	763		—
1890	865		13.4%
1900	898		3.8%
1910	1,056		17.6%
1920	1,112		5.3%
1930	1,184		6.5%
1940	1,056		−10.8%
1950	983		−6.9%
1960	868		−11.7%
1970	789		−9.1%
1980	751		−4.8%
1990	607		−19.2%
2000	518		−14.7%
2010	1,049		102.5%
2020	959		−8.6%

As of the 2020 census, Chauncey had a population of 959. The racial makeup of the village was 94.6% White, 0.7% African American, 0.1% Native American, 0.2% Asian, and 4.4% from two or more races. Hispanic or Latino residents of any race were 1.2% of the population.

== Public services ==
The residents of Chauncey are served by the Athens City School District and Athens High School. Chauncey has a public library, a branch of the Athens County Public Libraries.

The community owns the 127-acre (0.51 km^{2}) Chauncey-Dover Community Park, formerly strip mine lands acquired by the United States Forest Service and ceded to the village.

== Parks and recreation ==
In recent years, Chauncey has developed several outdoor recreation areas on former coal mining and floodplain land. The Chauncey–Dover Community Park, covering 127 acres, includes trails, forest, open fields, and hillside access just outside the village center.

In 2016, the Athens Conservancy established the Chauncey Canal Trail and Wetland Preserve, a 13.5-acre area along Sunday Creek with walking paths and protected riparian habitat.

Chauncey is also the start of the Hocking River Paddle Route toward Grosvenor, offering kayak and canoe access during the warmer months.

== Transportation ==
State Route 682 ends in Chauncey at a junction with SR 13. When US 33 was re-routed in the 1960s, SR 682 was extended to maintain direct access to Athens. The village remains a commuter community for nearby cities like Athens and Nelsonville.

== Historic sites ==
Just outside the village lies the Athens County Infirmary, a 19th-century complex listed on the National Register of Historic Places. The site includes brick institutional buildings, barns, and a cemetery that served the county's poor and mentally ill.
