= Garden, Ohio =

Unincorporated community in Ohio, U.S.

Coordinates: 39°12′34″N 81°58′32″W

Garden is an unincorporated community in Athens County, in the U.S. state of Ohio.

== History ==
A post office called Garden was established 1852, and remained in operation until 1904. Besides the post office, Garden had several shops, a country store, and a church.
