= Waterloo Township, Ohio =

Township in Ohio, US

Waterloo Township, Athens County, Ohio
- Township
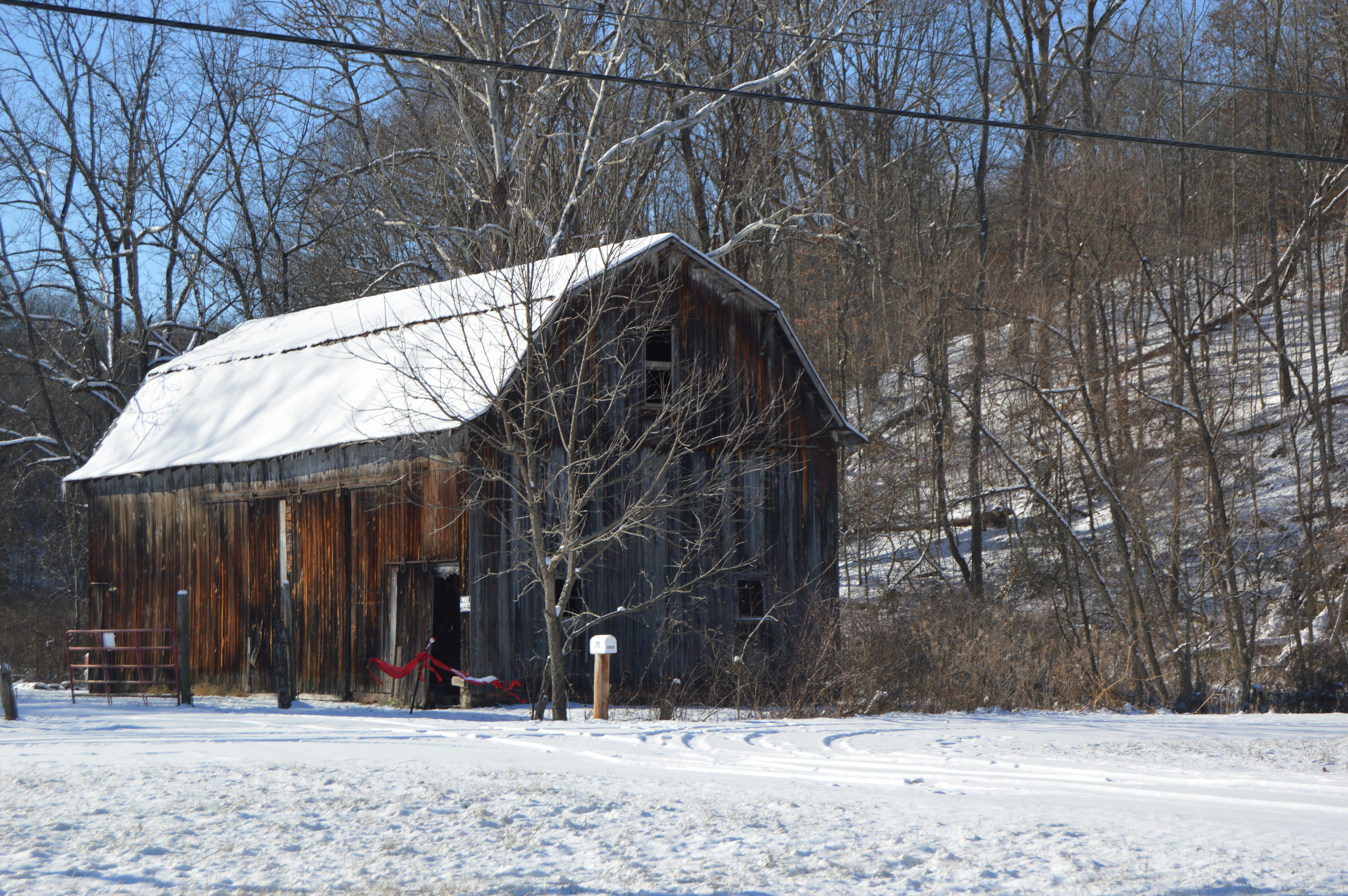
- Snowy scene on State Route 691

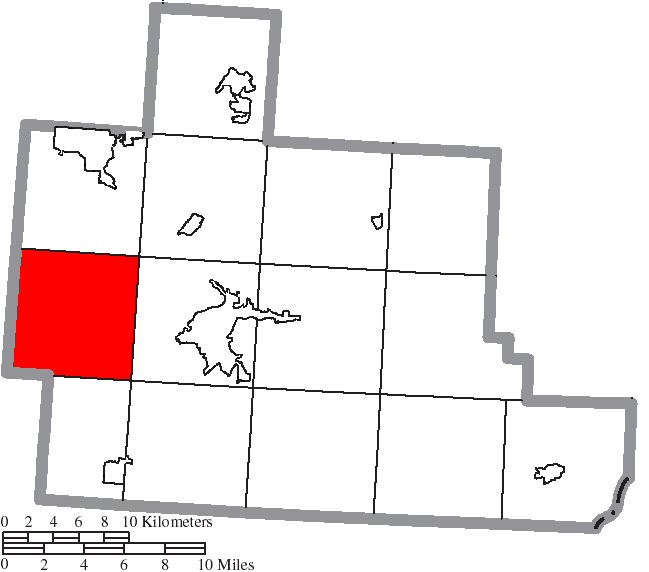
- Location of Waterloo Township in Athens County
- Coordinates: 39°20′22″N 82°13′56″W
- Country: United States
- State: Ohio
- County: Athens

Area
  - Total: 37.9 sq mi (98.2 km^{2})
  - Land: 37.7 sq mi (97.7 km^{2})
  - Water: 0.19 sq mi (0.5 km^{2})
- Elevation: 807 ft (246 m)

Population (2020)
  - Total: 2,352
  - Density: 62.4/sq mi (24.1/km^{2})
- Time zone: UTC-5 (Eastern (EST))
  - Summer (DST): UTC-4 (EDT)
- FIPS code: 39-81777
- GNIS feature ID: 1085760

Waterloo Township is one of the fourteen townships of Athens County, Ohio, United States. The 2020 census found 2,352 people in the township.

== Geography ==
Located in the western part of the county, it borders the following townships:

- York Township - north
- Dover Township - northeast corner
- Athens Township - east
- Alexander Township - southeast corner
- Lee Township - south
- Knox Township, Vinton County - southwest corner
- Brown Township, Vinton County - west
- Starr Township, Hocking County - northwest corner

No municipalities are located in Waterloo Township, although three unincorporated communities lie in the township: New Marshfield in the center, Carbondale in the township's northwest, and Mineral in the west-center of the township.

== Name and history ==
Waterloo Township was organized in 1826. Its name commemorates the Battle of Waterloo.

It is the only Waterloo Township statewide.

== Government ==
The township is governed by a three-member board of trustees, who are elected in November of odd-numbered years to a four-year term beginning on the following January 1. Two are elected in the year after the presidential election and one is elected in the year before it. There is also an elected township fiscal officer, who serves a four-year term beginning on April 1 of the year after the election, which is held in November of the year before the presidential election. Vacancies in the fiscal officership or on the board of trustees are filled by the remaining trustees.

== Public lands ==
Waterloo Township includes the entirety of the Waterloo Wildlife Research Station, the Waterloo State Forest, and a significant portion of the Zaleski State Forest. The Moonville Rail-Trail originates in Mineral within the township. Points of interest in the township include "Devils Tea-Table", a geological pillar formation on private land; the King Switch Tunnel, a timber tunnel on the Moonville Rail-Trail; a small natural bridge on Biddyville Road; and the county's largest beaver pond, also on Biddyville Road.
