= Bedford Township, Meigs County, Ohio =

Township in Ohio, US

- Township
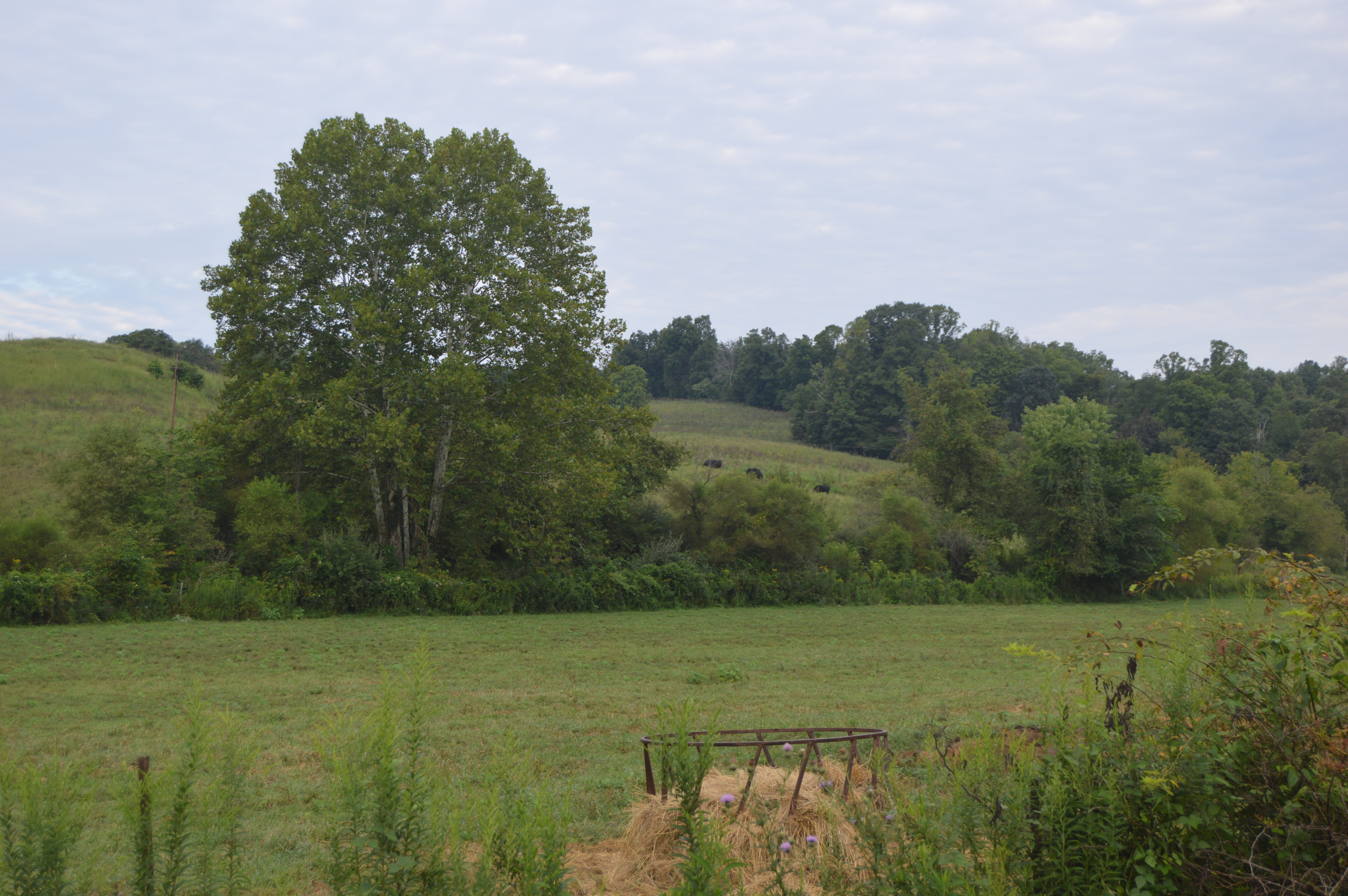
- Fields northwest of Darwin on State Route 681

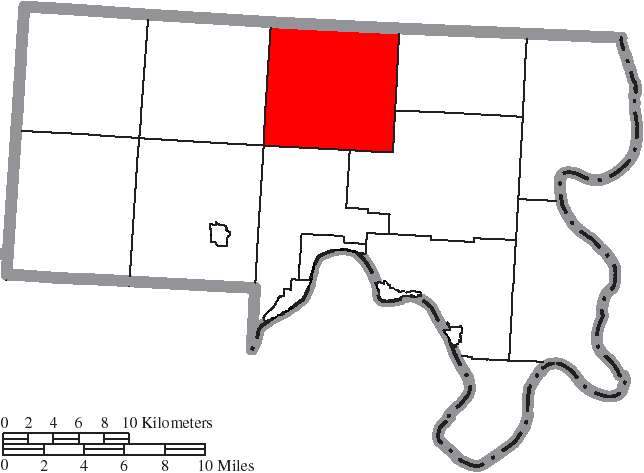
- Location of Bedford Township in Meigs County
- Coordinates: 39°8′26″N 82°0′37″W
- Country: United States
- State: Ohio
- County: Meigs

Area
  - Total: 39.3 sq mi (101.7 km^{2})
  - Land: 39.3 sq mi (101.7 km^{2})
  - Water: 0 sq mi (0.0 km^{2})
- Elevation: 679 ft (207 m)

Population (2020)
  - Total: 1,249
  - Density: 31.81/sq mi (12.28/km^{2})
- Time zone: UTC-5 (Eastern (EST))
  - Summer (DST): UTC-4 (EDT)
- FIPS code: 39-04906
- GNIS feature ID: 1086608

Bedford Township is one of the twelve townships of Meigs County, Ohio, United States. The 2020 census found 1,249 people in the township.

== Geography ==
Located in the northern part of the county, it borders the following townships:

- Lodi Township, Athens County - north
- Carthage Township, Athens County - northeast corner
- Orange Township - east
- Chester Township - southeast
- Salisbury Township - south
- Rutland Township - southwest corner
- Scipio Township - west
- Alexander Township, Athens County - northwest corner

No municipalities are located in Bedford Township, although the unincorporated community of Darwin is located in the township's far north.

== Name and history ==
Statewide, the only other Bedford Township is located in Coshocton County.

== Government ==
The township is governed by a three-member board of trustees, who are elected in November of odd-numbered years to a four-year term beginning on the following January 1. Two are elected in the year after the presidential election and one is elected in the year before it. There is also an elected township fiscal officer, who serves a four-year term beginning on April 1 of the year after the election, which is held in November of the year before the presidential election. Vacancies in the fiscal officership or on the board of trustees are filled by the remaining trustees.
