= Hartleyville, Ohio =

Unincorporated community in Ohio, U.S.

Coordinates: 39°32′38″N 82°06′12″W

Hartleyville is an unincorporated community in Athens County, in the U.S. state of Ohio. The community lies near the mouth of Johnson Run creek.

== History ==
A 2003 local newspaper report describes it as "almost forgotten". A post office called Hartleyville was established in 1851, and remained in operation until 1893.
