= New England, Ohio =

Unincorporated community in Rome Township, Ohio, United States

Coordinates: 39°20′02″N 81°56′27″W

New England is an unincorporated community in Rome Township, Athens County, Ohio, United States.

== History ==
New England was laid out in 1853 when the railroad was built into the area. A post office called New England was established in 1856, and remained in operation until 1907.
