= New Marshfield, Ohio =

- Census-designated place
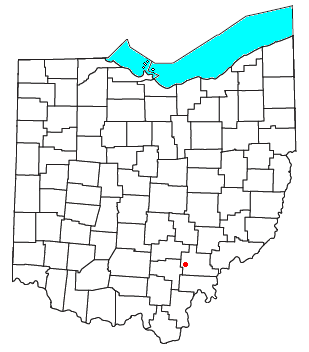
- Location of New Marshfield, Ohio
- Coordinates: 39°19′31″N 82°12′59″W
- Country: United States
- State: Ohio
- County: Athens
- Township: Waterloo
- Elevation: 843 ft (257 m)

Population (2020)
  - Total: 316
- Time zone: UTC-5 (Eastern (EST))
  - Summer (DST): UTC-4 (EDT)
- ZIP code: 45766
- Area code: 740
- GNIS feature ID: 2628942
- Website: newmarshfieldohio.wixsite.com/newmarshfield

New Marshfield is a census-designated place in central Waterloo Township, Athens County, Ohio, United States. The population was 316 at the 2020 census. It has a post office with the ZIP code 45766. It is located along State Route 56 west of the county seat of Athens.

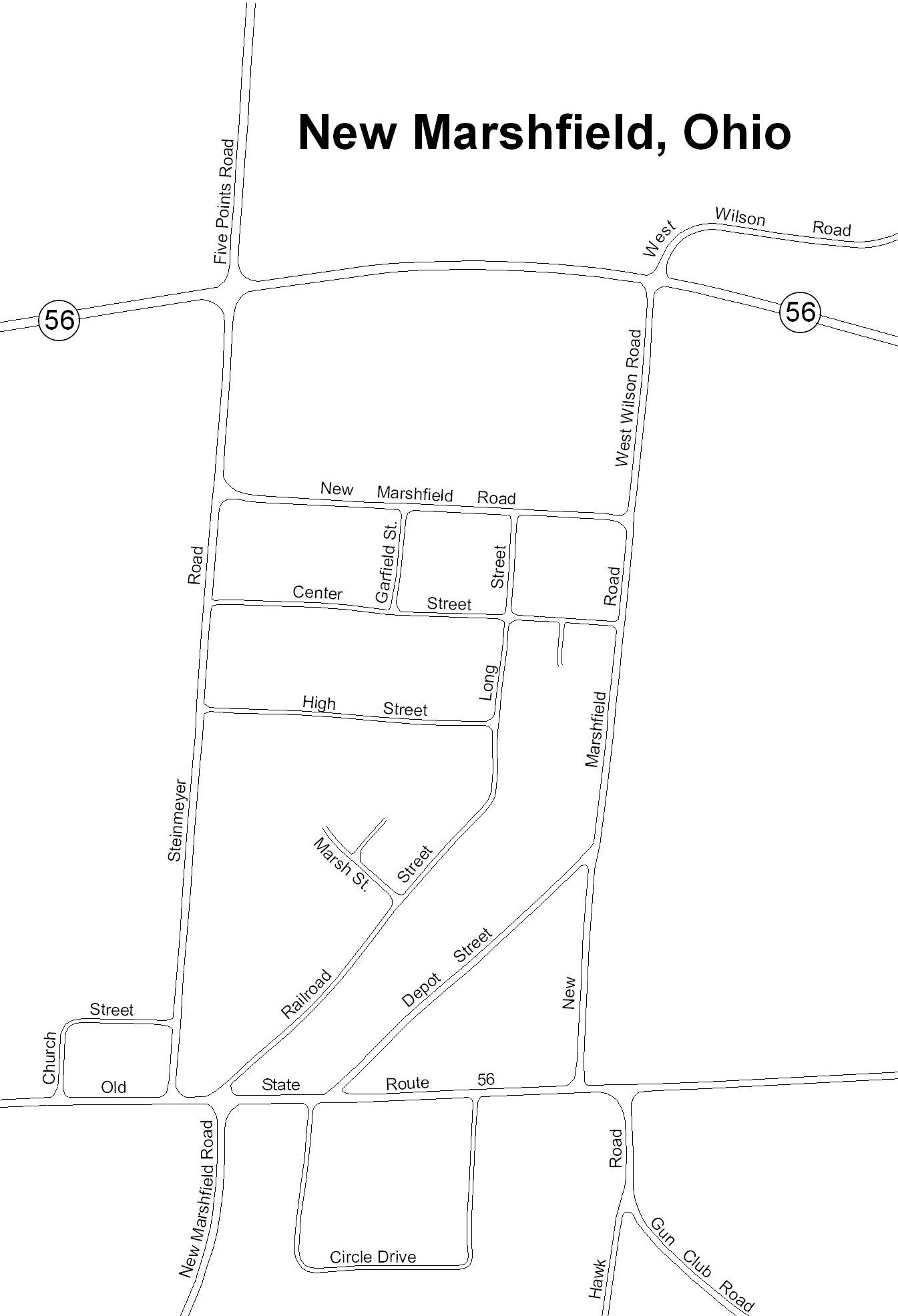

== History ==
The B&O Railroad formerly passed through the community, but the line was abandoned in the 1980s.

A post office called Marshfield was established in 1857, and the post office was renamed New Marshfield in 1909. By the 1880s, (New) Marshfield had a train station and several stores.

== Education ==
Public Education in the community of New Marshfield is provided by the Alexander Local School District. Campuses serving the community include Alexander Elementary School] (Grades PK-5), Alexander Middle School] (Grades 6–8), and Alexander High School (Grades 9–12).
