= Torch, Ohio =

Unincorporated community in Ohio, United States

Coordinates: 39°14′22″N 81°44′56″W

Torch is an unincorporated community in Athens County, in the U.S. state of Ohio.

== History ==
Torch had its start when the railroad was extended to that point. According to tradition, the community was named for the fact local churchgoers carried torches. A post office called Torch was established in 1851, and remained in operation until 2002.
