= Pleasanton, Ohio =

Coordinates: 39°14′26″N 82°05′36″W

Pleasanton is an unincorporated community in Athens County, Ohio, United States.

== History ==
The first house in Pleasanton was built in 1817, and other settlement soon followed. A post office called Pleasanton was established in 1850, and remained in operation until 1906.
