= Sunday Creek (Ohio) =

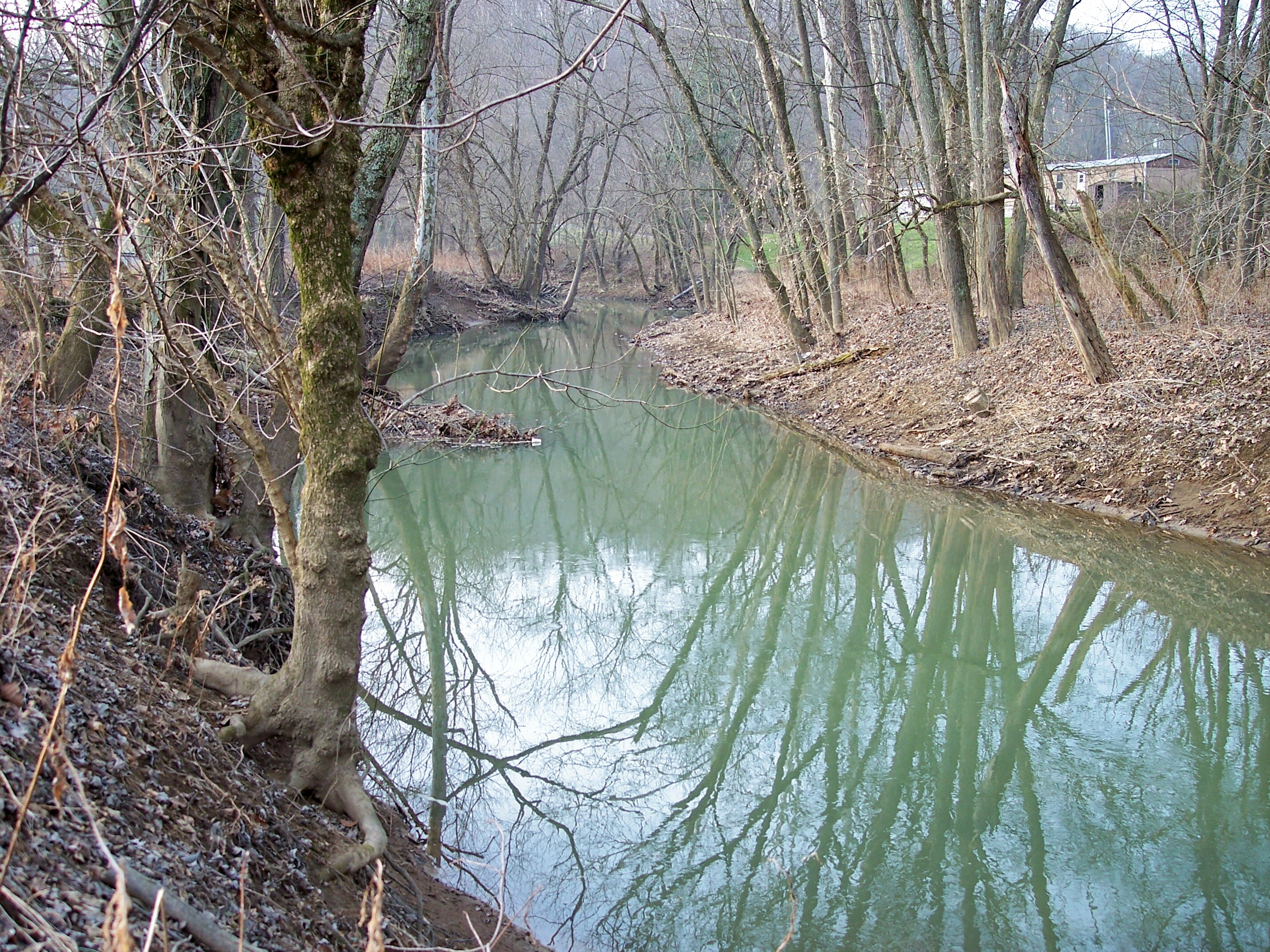
- Sunday Creek in Glouster, Ohio in 2006

Location
- Country: United States
- State: Ohio
- Counties: Perry, Athens

Physical characteristics
- Source
  - location: Perry County, Ohio, approximately 5 mi (8.0 km) north of Corning
  - coordinates: 39°40′28″N 82°05′37″W
  - elevation: Approx. 800 ft (240 m)
- Mouth
  - location: Hocking River at Chauncey, Ohio
  - coordinates: 39°23′32″N 82°07′24″W
  - elevation: 640 ft (200 m)
- Length: 27.2 mi (43.8 km)
- Basin size: 139 mi^{2} (360 km^{2})
- Discharge
  - location: near Millfield
  - average: 160.95 cu ft/s (4.558 m^{3}/s), USGS water years 2003-2015

Sunday Creek is a tributary of the Hocking River, 27.2 miles (43.8 km) long, in southeastern Ohio in the United States. Via the Hocking and Ohio Rivers, it is part of the watershed of the Mississippi River, draining 139 square miles (360 km^{2}) in a mainly rural area of the Allegheny Plateau region. Its name is locally said to derive from early white settlers who in 1802 reached the creek on a Sunday, and so named it after the day of their discovery. (also see nearby Monday Creek.)

Sunday Creek rises in southeastern Perry County and flows generally southwardly into northern Athens County, passing through the communities of Rendville, Corning, Glouster, Trimble, Jacksonville, and Millfield (site of the 1930 Millfield Mine disaster), to Chauncey, where it flows into the Hocking River. In Athens County north of Glouster it collects the East Branch Sunday Creek, 15.5 miles (25 km) long, which rises in Perry County and passes through Morgan County. Tom Jenkins Dam, constructed on the East Branch in Athens County in 1950 by the U.S. Army Corps of Engineers, forms Burr Oak Lake, the site of Burr Oak State Park. In Glouster, Sunday Creek collects the West Branch Sunday Creek, 14 miles (22.5 km) long, which rises in Perry County and flows generally southwardly.

Other significant Tributaries include Greens Run, Mud Fork, and Johnson Run, all perennial streams draining the area to the west of the creek.

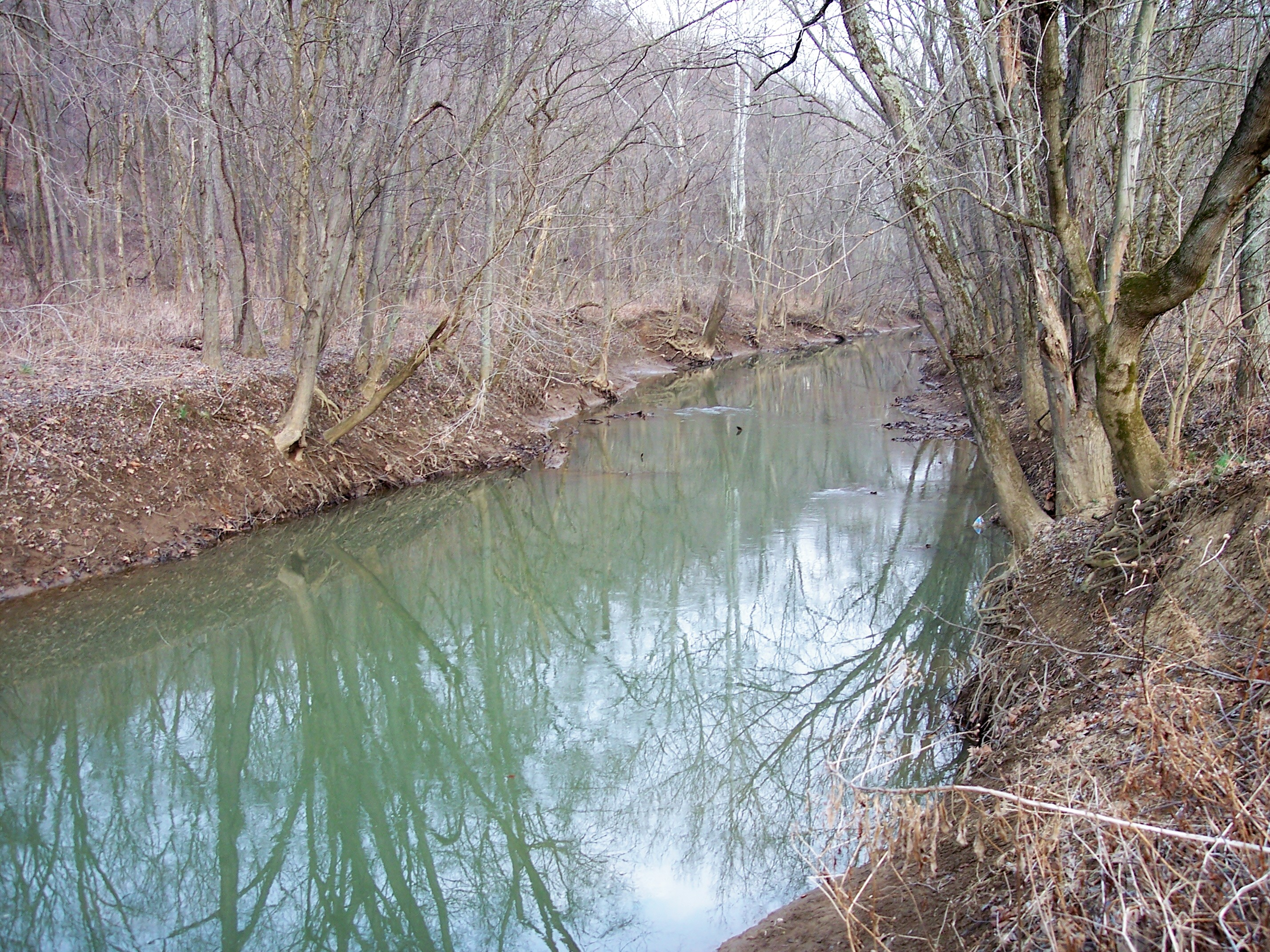
Sunday Creek in Glouster in 2006

A predominant land use in the watershed of Sunday Creek has historically been coal mining, with both underground and surface mines in the area. A 1997 study by the Ohio Environmental Protection Agency identified the lowermost thirteen miles of Sunday Creek as having been "irretrievably damaged to the extent that no appreciable aquatic life can be supported" due to the creek's low pH, caused by acid mine drainage. The lower areas of the creek are generally colored orange from the effects of acid-mine drainage during times of low water.

As of 2012, an organization called the Sunday Creek Watershed Group operates with the intention of addressing water quality and ecosystem-related matters in the watershed. It is sponsored by Rural Action, a non-profit organization in southeastern Ohio.

== See also ==
- Palos Covered Bridge, which spans the creek and is listed on the National Register of Historic Places
- List of rivers of Ohio
- Monday Creek
