= Trimble High School (Glouster, Ohio) =

Location
- 1 Tomcat Drive; Glouster, (Athens County), Ohio 45732; United States; 39°28′15″N 82°4′45″W

Information
- Type: Public, Coeducational high school
- Established: 1964
- School district: Trimble Local School District
- Superintendent: Dr. Kristi Syme
- Principal: Matt Curtis
- Staff: 18.00 (FTE)
- Grades: 9-12
- Enrollment: 182 (2024-2025)
- Student to teacher ratio: 10.11
- Colors: Red and Gray
- Athletics: baseball; boys' and girls' basketball; boys' and girls' cross country; football; boys' and girls' golf; fast pitch softball; boys' and girls' track and field; boys' and girls' indoor track and field; girls' volleyball; and boys' wrestling and boys' and girls' marching band. (Division VII)
- Athletics conference: Tri-Valley Conference-Hocking Division
- Team name: Tomcats
- Website: District Website

Trimble High School (THS) is a public high school in Glouster, Ohio, located in Athens County in southeast Ohio. It is the only high school (grades 9–12) in the Trimble Local School District. The school district serves the residents of Glouster, Jacksonville, and Trimble. The school mascot is a tomcat and the school colors are red, white, and gray.

== Brief history ==
At the start of the 1964-65 school year Glouster High School and Jacksonville-Trimble (known as J-T) High School consolidated. From 1964 until 1973 the school was known as Glouster High School. In 1971, the first K-8 classes were held at the new elementary school that opened just outside Jacksonville in Trimble Township. Beginning two years later, in fall of 1973 and lasting until spring of 1987, Grades K-4 and 9-12 were housed in the Jacksonville building while Grades 5-8 were housed in the older Glouster building. The district then adopted the name of the township, becoming the Trimble Local School District, and the high school was renamed "Trimble High School." The mascot and color scheme for the original Glouster High was the idea of football coach Carl Bachman in 1929. When the schools consolidated, it was agreed that the Glouster Tomcat, rather than the J-T Cardinal, would be the mascot of the school and the J-T colors of red and white would be the official colors of the school. Later the color grey was added as an accent color, thus incorporating the colors of both former schools. The present high school was built in 1986 in Glouster by state and local funding. It was updated in 1998. The school has between 310 and 340 students and a staff of around 30. The high school is also the home of the district offices.

== Athletics ==
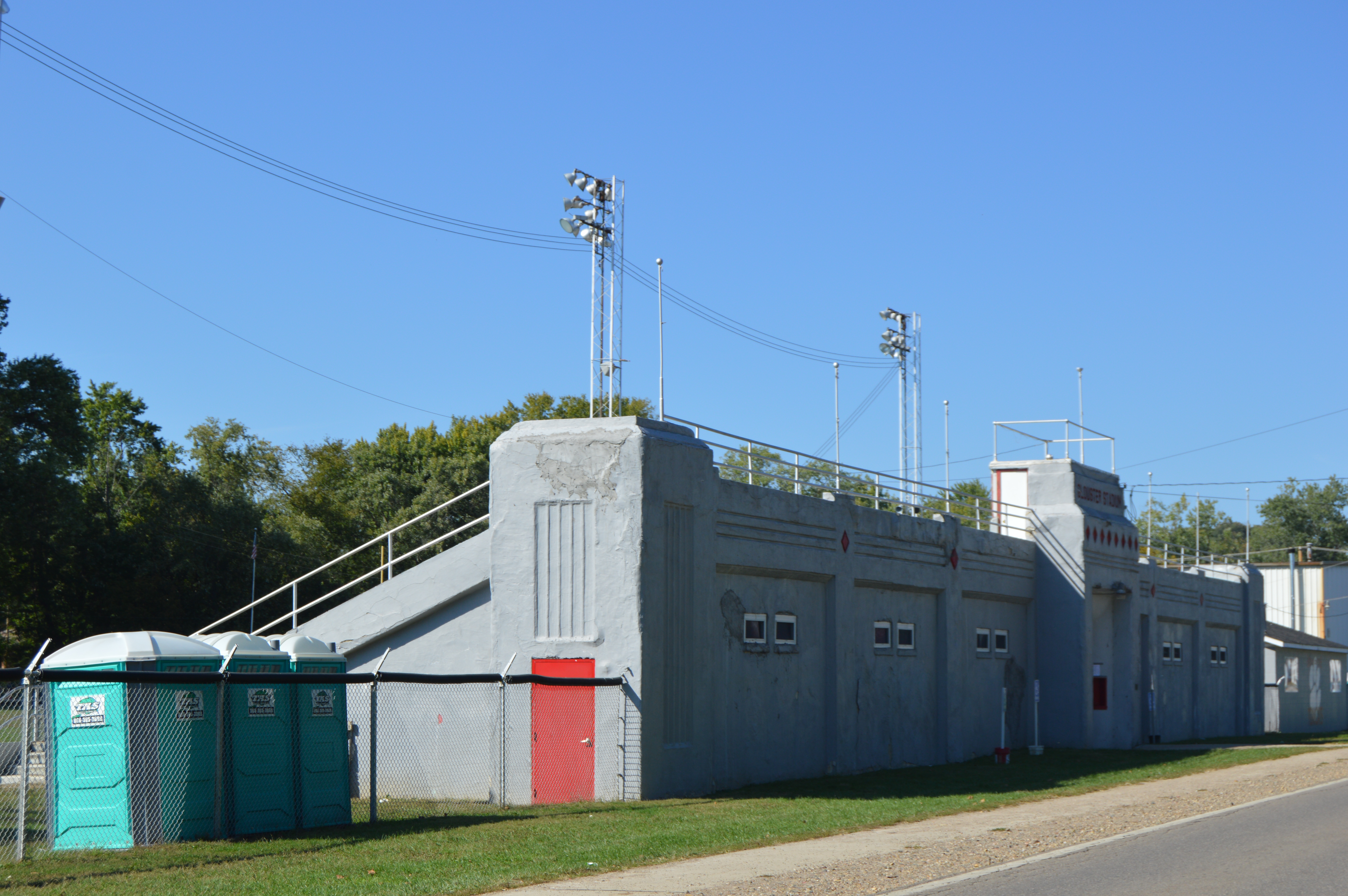
Glouster Stadium

The Tomcats belong to the Ohio High School Athletic Association (OHSAA) and the Tri-Valley Conference, a 13-member athletic conference located in southeastern Ohio. The conference is divided into two divisions based on school size, with the larger schools comprising the Ohio Division and the smaller schools (including Trimble) comprising the Hocking Division. In 2013, Trimble's football team reached the state final, at which it was defeated by Marion Local. In 2018 Trimble's football stadium was condemned and torn down for a new stadium built with funds from the towns people plus surrounding area towns and schools. The team again returned to the state finals this time at the Canton, Ohio, Pro Hall of Fame stadium. They lost to McComb 28–3 to finish the season 13–2.

2013 Division VII State Runner-Up

2018 Division VII State Runner-Up

== See also ==
- Ohio High School Athletic Conferences
