= Millfield (disambiguation) =

Millfield is a co-educational independent boarding school in Somerset, England.

Millfield or Milfield may also refer to:

== Places ==
=== In Australia ===
- Millfield, New South Wales, a suburb of Cessnock

=== In the United Kingdom ===
- Millfield, Aberdeenshire, a location
- Millfield, Peterborough, Cambridgeshire
- Milfield, Northumberland
- Millfield, Tyne and Wear, a suburb of Sunderland
  - Millfield Metro station, Tyne and Wear

=== In the United States ===
- Millfield, Ohio

== Schools ==
- Millfield School, Lancashire, a secondary school in Lancashire, England

== See also ==
- Millfield Mine disaster, Ohio, USA
- Millfields, Lea Bridge, London Borough of Hackney
