= Trimble Township Community Forest =

Forest preserve in Athens County, Ohio, US

Coordinates: 39.5275°N 82.1176°W

- IUCN category V (protected landscape/seascape)
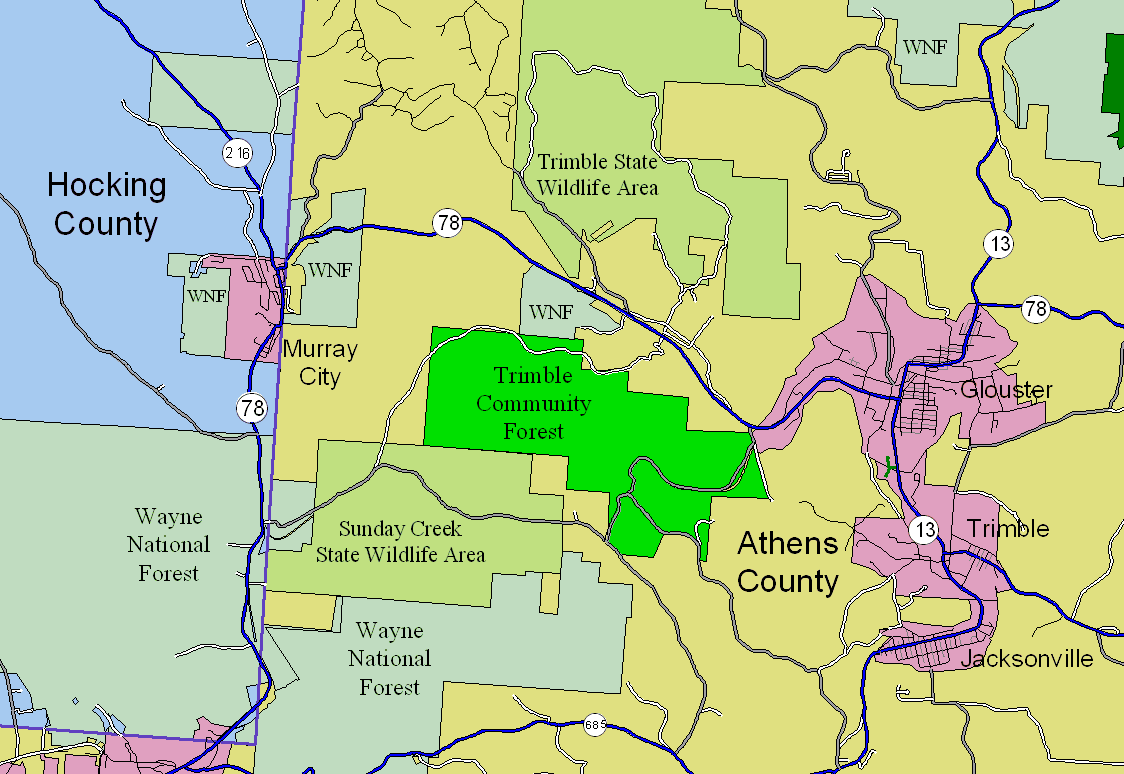
- Trimble Township Community Forest boundary map
- Location: Athens County, Ohio
- Nearest city: Trimble Township, OH
- Area: 1,200 acres (4.9 km^{2})
- Established: 2006
- Governing body: Appalachia Ohio Alliance

The Trimble Community Forest or Trimble Township Community Forest is a 1,200-acre (4.9 km^{2}) forest preserve owned by the Appalachia Ohio Alliance, a land trust located in southeast Ohio. Formerly called Taylor Ridge, it was purchased in 2006 from the Sunday Creek Coal Company, and was formerly part of the Sunday Creek State Wildlife Area. The land has a long history of coal, oil, natural gas, and timber production. The AOA negotiated with the Trimble Township Trustees on its use before purchase. It is located in Athens County, Ohio, south of Ohio State Route 78, between Glouster, Ohio and Murray City, Ohio.

The forest is used as a land lab by nearby Trimble High School and Trimble Middle School. The land lab area is known as the Trimble Tomcat Environmental Learning Lab. The Ohio Division of Wildlife provides assistance to a local citizens committee that manages the forest.
