= Glouster, Ohio =

- Village
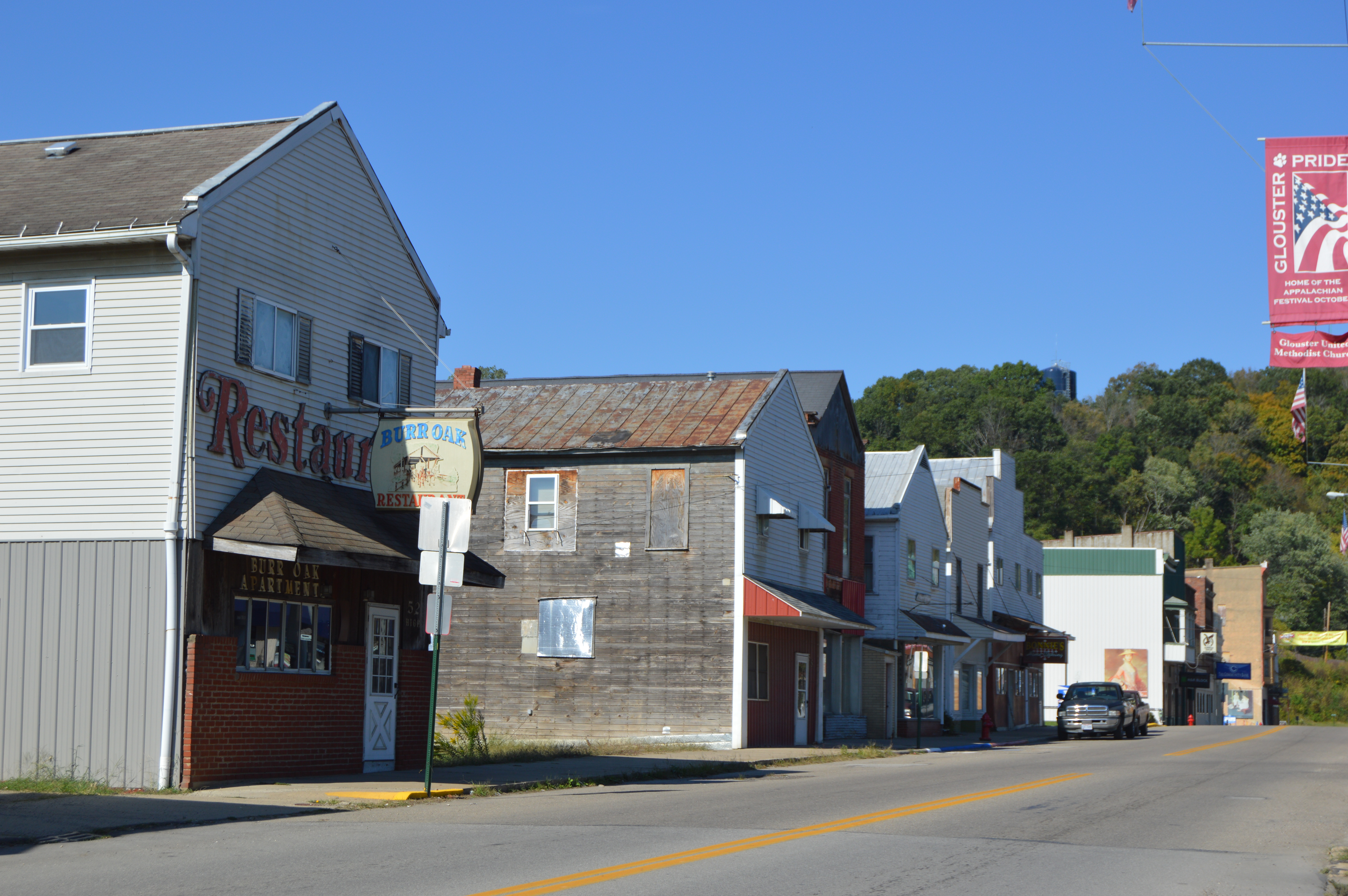
- High Street downtown

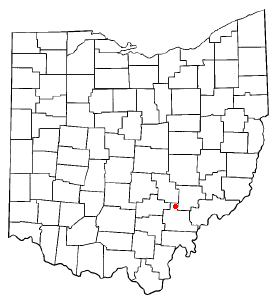
- Location of Glouster, Ohio

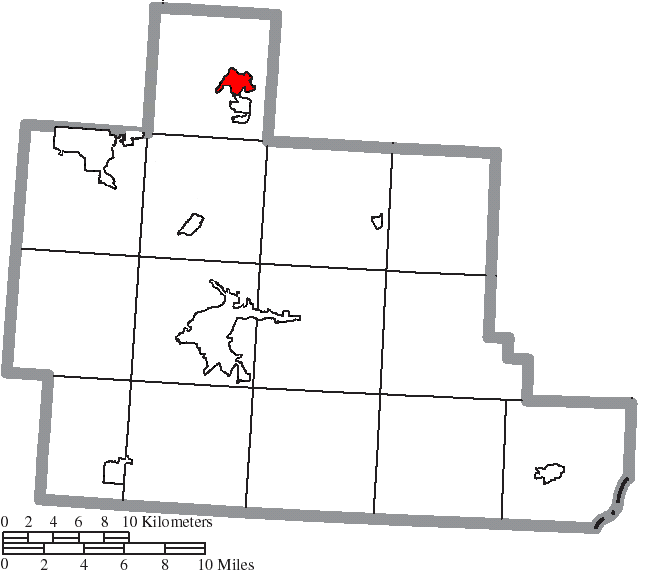
- Location of Glouster in Athens County
- Coordinates: 39°30′00″N 82°05′03″W
- Country: United States
- State: Ohio
- County: Athens
- Township: Trimble

Area
  - Total: 1.32 sq mi (3.43 km^{2})
  - Land: 1.31 sq mi (3.39 km^{2})
  - Water: 0.015 sq mi (0.04 km^{2})
- Elevation: 686 ft (209 m)

Population (2020)
  - Total: 1,659
  - Estimate (2023): 1,629
  - Density: 1,267.0/sq mi (489.21/km^{2})
- Time zone: UTC-5 (Eastern (EST))
  - Summer (DST): UTC-4 (EDT)
- ZIP code: 45732
- Area code: 740
- FIPS code: 39-30674
- GNIS feature ID: 2398982

Glouster is a village in Trimble Township, Athens County, Ohio, United States. The population was 1,659 at the 2020 census. It is close to Burr Oak State Park.

== History ==
Glouster was originally known as Sedalia, but the name was changed in 1886 to Glouster, a variant spelling of Gloucester, England. A post office has been in operation under the name Glouster since 1887.

The area grew rapidly in the late 19th century due to its location along the Sunday Creek coal seam, part of the broader Hocking Valley coal region. Mining, brickmaking, and railroads supported the village’s economy through the early 20th century. Glouster was once home to the Wassall Brick Company, which operated from approximately 1895 to 1932 and provided structural materials for projects throughout southeast Ohio.

Like many Appalachian coal towns, Glouster experienced economic decline as coal production diminished in the mid-20th century. The legacy of mining still shapes the community’s geography and infrastructure.

== Landmarks and infrastructure ==
One mile north of Glouster stands the historic Palos Covered Bridge, built in 1879 over the East Fork of Sunday Creek. It is a multiple kingpost truss bridge and is listed on the National Register of Historic Places.

Glouster is also served by GoBus, a federally-funded rural transit service launched in 2010 that provides daily intercity bus connections between Athens, Columbus, and other towns.

== Geography ==
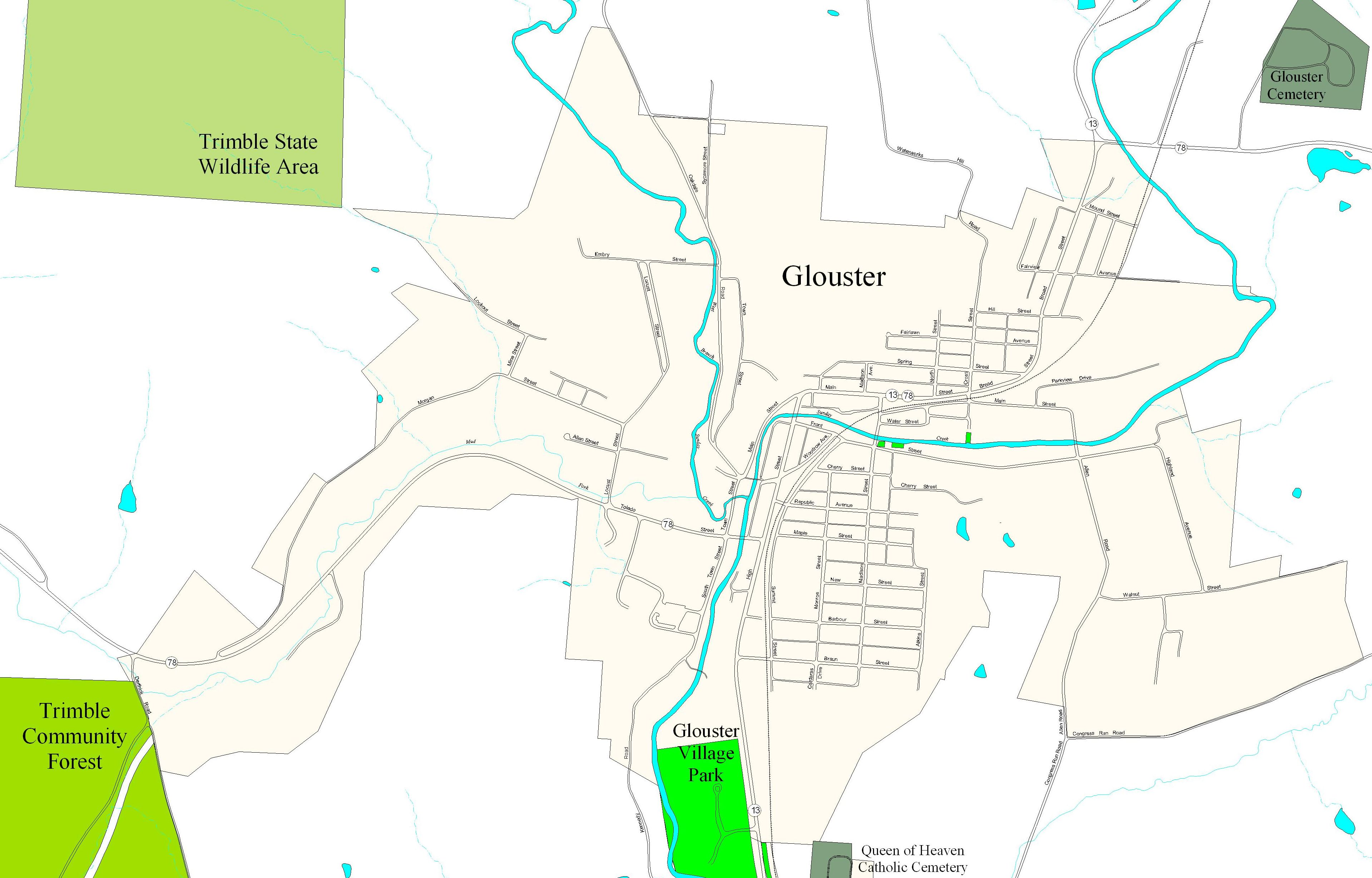
Map of Glouster

Glouster is located at the confluence of the West Branch Sunday Creek and Sunday Creek. The village is located entirely within the Sunday Creek watershed, mostly on riparian plains or old stream terraces.

According to the United States Census Bureau, the village has a total area of 1.34 square miles (3.47 km^{2}), of which 1.33 square miles (3.44 km^{2}) is land and 0.01 square miles (0.03 km^{2}) is water.

The surrounding area consists of gently rolling hills and large wooded areas, all within the unglaciated Allegheny Plateau. Nearby public and semi-public areas include the Trimble State Wildlife Area, the Sunday Creek State Wildlife Area, the Trimble Community Forest, the Wayne National Forest, and Burr Oak State Park.

Glouster Community Park is located along the west side of Ohio State Route 13, between the highway and Sunday Creek, on the south end of the village.

== Demographics ==
According to the U.S. Census Bureau, the population of Glouster was 1,659 in 2020. Estimates from 2023 indicate a slight decline to approximately 1,629 residents. The median age is 42.1 years, and the median household income is approximately $37,639. About 27.4% of residents live below the poverty line.

Historical population
Census	Pop.	Note	%±
1900	2,155		—
1910	2,527		17.3%
1920	3,140		24.3%
1930	2,903		−7.5%
1940	2,847		−1.9%
1950	2,327		−18.3%
1960	2,255		−3.1%
1970	2,121		−5.9%
1980	2,211		4.2%
1990	2,001		−9.5%
2000	1,972		−1.4%
2010	1,791		−9.2%
2020	1,659		−7.4%
2023 (est.)	1,629	▼	−1.8%
U.S. Decennial Census

=== 2010 census ===
As of the census of 2010, there were 1,791 people, 720 households, and 471 families living in the village. The population density was 1,346.6 inhabitants per square mile (519.9/km^{2}). There were 864 housing units at an average density of 649.6 per square mile (250.8/km^{2}). The racial makeup of the village was 96.1% White, 1.4% African American, 0.1% Native American, 0.2% Asian, 0.1% from other races, and 2.1% from two or more races. Hispanic or Latino of any race were 0.8% of the population.

There were 720 households, of which 35.6% had children under the age of 18 living with them, 39.4% were married couples living together, 18.2% had a female householder with no husband present, 7.8% had a male householder with no wife present, and 34.6% were non-families. 29% of all households were made up of individuals, and 11.9% had someone living alone who was 65 years of age or older. The average household size was 2.49 and the average family size was 34.

The median age in the village was 35.8 years. 27.7% of residents were under the age of 18; 8.6% were between the ages of 18 and 24; 26.3% were from 25 to 44; 25.6% were from 45 to 64; and 11.9% were 65 years of age or older. The gender makeup of the village was 47.8% male and 52.2% female.

=== 2000 census ===
As of the census of 2000, there were 1,972 people, 783 households, and 526 families living in the village. The population density was 1,470.9 inhabitants per square mile (567.9/km^{2}). There were 906 housing units at an average density of 675.8 per square mile (260.9/km^{2}). The racial makeup of the village was 95.74% White, 1.37% African American, 0.15% Native American, 05% Asian, 0.2% from other races, and 2.48% from two or more races. Hispanic or Latino of any race were 16% of the population.

There were 783 households, out of which 35.5% had children under the age of 18 living with them, 43.4% were married couples living together, 17% had a female householder with no husband present, and 32.8% were non-families. 28.1% of all households were made up of individuals, and 12.4% had someone living alone who was 65 years of age or older. The average household size was 2.52 and the average family size was 38.

In the village, the population was spread out, with 30.3% under the age of 18, 9.4% from 18 to 24, 27.4% from 25 to 44, 20.4% from 45 to 64, and 12.4% who were 65 years of age or older. The median age was 32 years. For every 100 females there were 89.3 males. For every 100 females age 18 and over, there were 84.7 males.

The median income for a household in the village was $23,929, and the median income for a family was $28,800. Males had a median income of $28,854 versus $22,206 for females. The per capita income for the village was $11,837. About 24.2% of families and 28.2% of the population were below the poverty line, including 36.3% of those under age 18 and 21.4% of those age 65 or over.

== Economy ==
A deep mine is located north of town. The nearby mining pit was closed, with active operations moved to the east of Burr Oak State Park, but the loading station is still at the old site because of the location of the railroad. The Trimble high school and middle school provide some local employment, as does Frog Ranch Foods, and Hocking-Athens-Perry Community Action Programs (HAPCAP). Tourist activity from nearby Burr Oak State Park as well as hunting in various nearby public lands also supports the economy. The village owns its own electrical and water utility, although it purchases the electricity from American Electric Power and the water from the Sunday Creek Water District.

== Infrastructure ==
=== Transportation ===
Ohio state highways 13 and 78 both pass through Glouster. State route 329 begins in adjacent Trimble, Ohio. A through-line of the Norfolk Southern Railway line passes through the community, and also provides services to the nearby Buckingham Coal Company mine.

=== Utilities ===
The village operates its own utility providing electricity and water to local residents. Sewage treatment is provided by a plant in nearby Trimble. Hocking-Athens-Perry Community Action Program serves the community by providing jobs, HEAP and PIPP assistance, weatherization of homes, and many other programs and services.

== Education ==
The residents of Glouster are served by the Trimble Local School District and Trimble High School. Glouster has a public library, a branch of the Athens County Public Libraries.

== See also ==
- Coal mining in Appalachia
