= Palos Covered Bridge =

- U.S. National Register of Historic Places
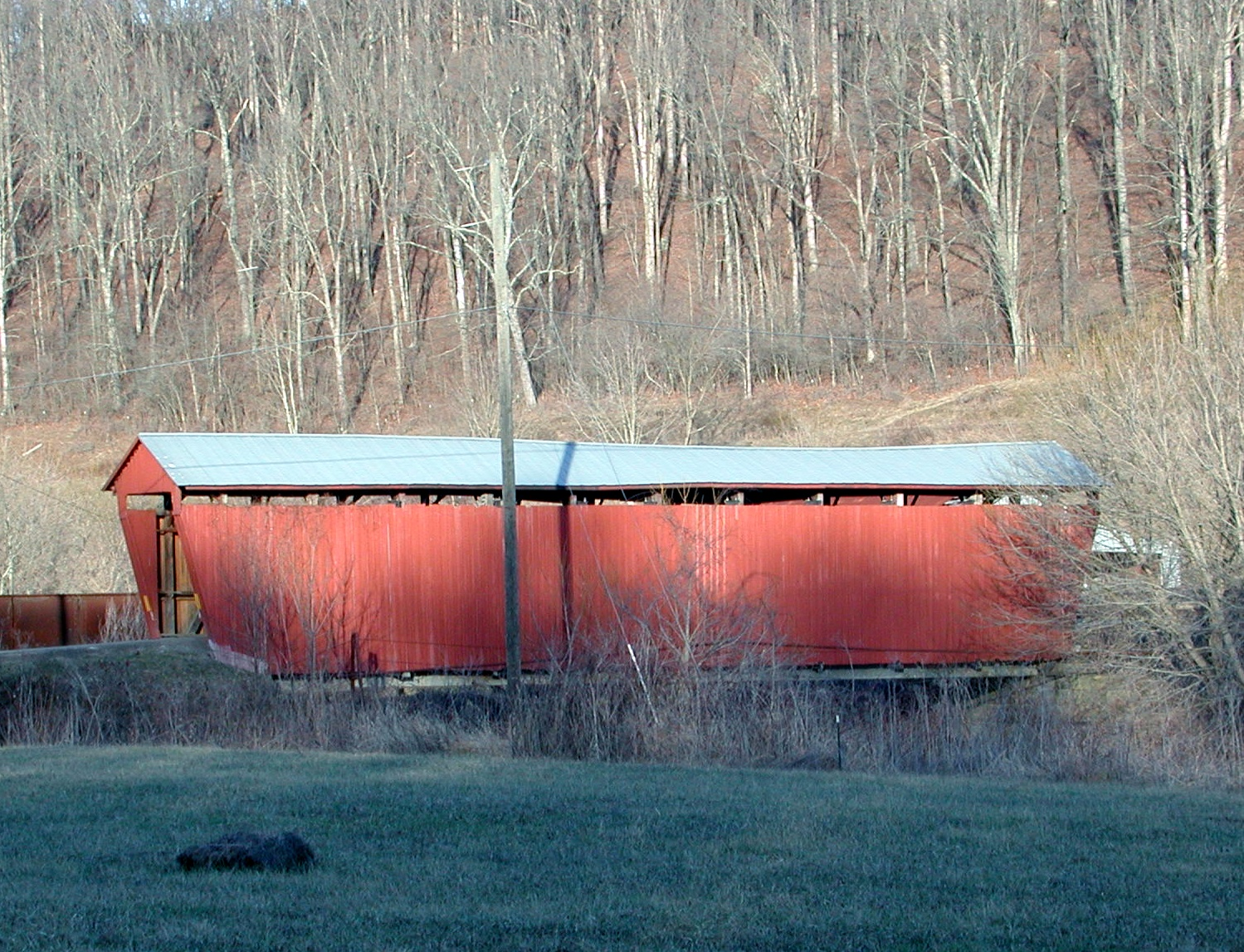

- Location within Ohio
- Nearest city: Glouster, Ohio
- Coordinates: 39°31′31″N 82°04′19″W
- Area: less than one acre
- Architectural style: Multiple kingpost truss
- NRHP reference No.: 77001041
- Added to NRHP: November 11, 1977

The Palos Covered Bridge, in Athens County, Ohio near Glouster, was listed on the National Register of Historic Places in 1977. It is a multiple kingpost truss covered bridge.

It is a single-span bridge spanning the east fork of Sunday Creek about one mile north of Glouster off State Route 13, in Trimble Township, Athens County, Ohio. It served the W. P. Rice Mine, a coal mine which operated from 1913 to 1925.
