= Taber Well Site =

US archaeological site

The Taber Well is an archaeological site of the Midwestern United States in the Hocking Valley, Southeastern Ohio. This site was used for studying general tribal institution and their formations, specifically those of the Hopewellian societies of the Early to Middle Woodland periods. The findings of Nicole Peoples, Elliot M. Abrams, AnnCorinne Freter, Brad Jokisch, and Paul E. Patton were to test the hypothesis of whether the lithic surplus production happened in specific areas of the site and if the excess was used for trading and gaining alliances with neighboring communities. Their hypothesis of habitation within the site was based on the site’s artifact inventory including chipped stone, stone tools, ground stone, and pottery.

== Site description ==
=== Background information ===
In 1985, an archaeologist at the Wayne National Forest named and registered the Taber Well site in the Ohio Archaeological Inventory (OAI). Through the use of Brewerton and Vosburg projectile point fragment analysis, the site was labeled as Late Archaic.

The site itself is found along the Monday Creek drainage of the Hocking River Valley (a tributary of the Ohio River) on an unglaciated plateau; this plateau provides a source of lithic outcroppings. It sits about 220 m above sea level. It is built upon about 1,000 m^{2} of the northwest, but half of it has since been built over for railroad and road construction. The space of the site selected for excavation was 572 m^{2} of continual undisturbed land.

This site was selected by Elliot Abrams and Ann Cramer from the Ohio University Archaeological Field Schools of 2000 and 2002. Despite the construction disturbance, the site was still relatively shielded from the public and small. With two nearby sites (the Boudinot 4 and the County Home site) already studied, the Taber Well site could provide more insight on the communities in this area.

=== Faunal and botanical information ===
The site was a mixed forest with a diverse understory beneath the trees with a marshland alongside it.

Trees	Oak*; Hickory*; Walnut; Butternut; Birch; Elm; Ash; Black Cherry; Sycamore
Understory	May apples; Shrubbery; Herbs; Grasses; Chenopodium; Sumpweed; Erect knotweed
Fauna	Beaver; Otter; Birds; Ducks; Turtles; Rabbits; Raccoons; Deer; Bears

Note: * denotes most prevalent species

== Research data ==
=== Field methods ===
Two separate field seasons (2000 and 2002) were researched as directed by Abrams.

2000	2002
Seven 2x2m units were excavated; 8.6m^{3} of soil; Hand excavated in two levels; Plow zone (A-horizon); Avg. 20 cm deep; Sandy silty loam; Contained 85% of all recovered artifacts; Level 2 (B-horizon); Avg. 10 cm deep; 11 new features encouraging further excavation; Defined as the site core or the main habitation are of the site; Screened through ¼ in mesh	Twelve more 2x2m units and seventeen 1x1m units within the site core were excavated; 10 more features found; 9.5m^{3} of soil; Followed same two level excavation and mesh screening process; Further investigation leads to a peripheral survey; Thirty-seven 50x50cm units spaced 10 m apart; 2.58m^{3} of soil

=== Features ===
Of the twenty features excavated from the site core, all were found to have some form of charcoal, flakes, fire-cracked rock, pottery, and/or hematite. Twelve were structural postmolds, six were labeled as hearths, and two were classified as generic pits. All twenty were concentrated on the site core’s spine. The depths at which they were found show superpositioning and reflect site reuse, which correlates with small community habitation on a recurring basis.

=== Chronology analysis ===
Three dates (two conventional radiocarbon and one accelerator mass spectrometry (AMS)) set Taber Well’s chronology. The calibrated radiocarbon age of the first two relate to the Middle Woodland period; the AMS dating indicates use during the late Early Woodland period.

=== Artifacts ===
Chipped stone	Majority of the artifacts found; Reduction sequence used to identify tool manufacture; Raw nodules, cores, decortication flakes, primary flakes, secondary flakes, tertiary flakes, bifacial thinning flakes, and shatter/chunks; Classified by chert type; Local Upper Mercer (Coshocton); Most prevalent; 36,255.8g representing 83.4% of total chert weight; Found in limestone; Vanport; Second most predominant type; 10.9% of total chert weight; Flint; Brush Creek; Third most abundant; 4.5% of total chert weight
Lithic tools	Categories included points, scrapers, utilized flakes, drills, bladelets, and preforms; 16 of 20 points were assigned to one general time period; Early Archaic: 1; Late Archaic: 8; Early Woodland: 3; Middle Woodland: 2; Possibly late woodland: 2
Ground stone	Indicated by count per m^{3} of soil showing artifact densities: Hammerstones: 4 (Units 5, 9, 13, 19); Nutting-stones: 2 (Units 9, 13); ¾ Grooved axe: 1 (Unit 13); Fractured axe: 2 (Unit 13); Other: 11 (Units 3, 9, 10, 13, 15, 19, 20, 23, 27, 29)
Pottery	95 potsherds recovered; 1 indeterminant fragment (Unit 15); 9 body sherds and 3 small Plain Ware fragments (Level 1, Unit 13); 82 Plain Ware fragments (Feature 21, Unit 33); Deposited in sity at base of postmold; 2 rim sherds, 26 body sherds, 54 small fragments; Fragments of this feature represent no more than one or two vessels

The chipped stone artifacts show the use of Taber Well’s geographic and naturally abundant outcroppings being utilized and used for tools. The dating of the lithic tools indicate primary site occupation being from Late Archaic to Middle Woodland. The clusters of ground stone artifacts demonstrate domestic activities within the site core. The pottery artifacts at the very least support that the occurrence of ceramics signifies domestic activity.

== Conclusions ==
=== 1. Site function – habitation and lithic harvesting/manufacturing ===
The evidence from the excavation indicated habitation was the primary purpose of the site during the end of the Late Archaic until the Middle Woodland period. The domestic use evidence are in line with other small Middle Woodland residential sites like the Wade site and the Murphy site.

However, the amount of lithic findings also suggest the site was partially purposed for lithic harvesting and manufacturing. The findings indicate that all parts of bifacial manufacture were done at the site. The 43,493.7 g of recovered chipped stone only represents 16% of the site core meaning that the full site core would have yielded about 271,835.6 g of lithic debitage based on extrapolations.

=== 2. Occupational history follows pattern of other domestic sites stemming from Hocking River ===
The general pattern is a noticeable Paleoindian/Early Archaic presence, greatly diminished Middle Archaic presence, population increase in Late Archaic period continuing into the Early and Middle Woodland periods. With the Taber Well site demonstrating this pattern, it is suggested that the tributaries allowed for some habitable areas similar to those along the main river.

=== 3. Domestic site parallels with emergent settlement pattern of middle woodland period ===
Geographic information system (GIS) analysis of the tributary shows formation of homesteads, habitation site clusters. This reveals the clusters were individual communities living within distinctly set boundaries likewise to those found at the Murphy site.

=== 4. Lithic tools manufactured in Taber Well were used as a trading commodity ===
Given the large relative extrapolated total lithic debitage that would have been found in the site core alone and the actual small percentage amount that was recovered, it is assumed that some of the lithic tools were moved from the site and used by people of other communities. The members of the Taber Well site used the outcroppings surrounding them to produce a surplus of lithic goods beyond the scope of their basic necessities. The members of the Taber Well site lived within close proximity of other communities from branching tributaries and the Ohio River itself.
