= Trimble, Ohio =

- Village
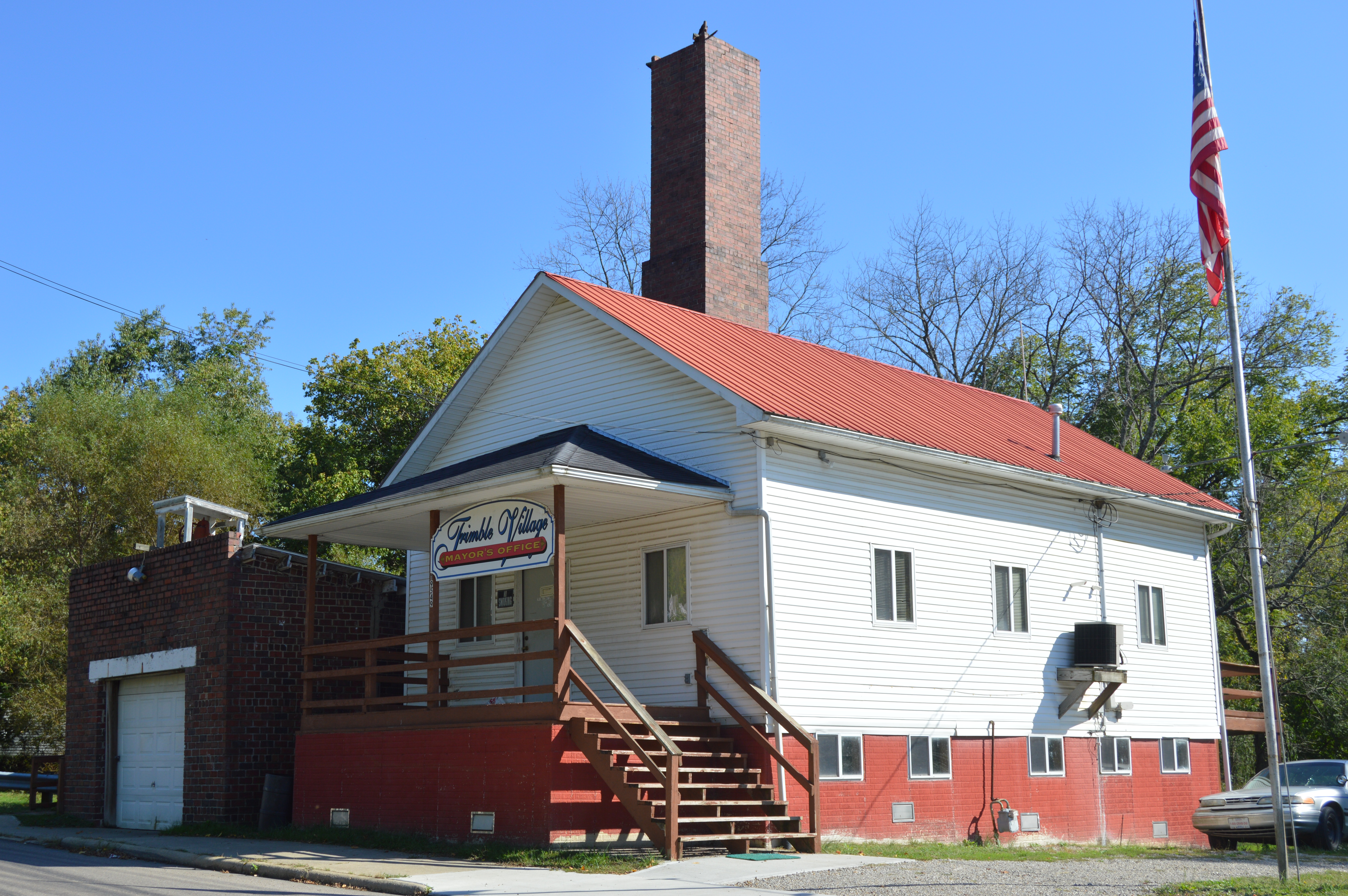
- Village hall on Congress Street

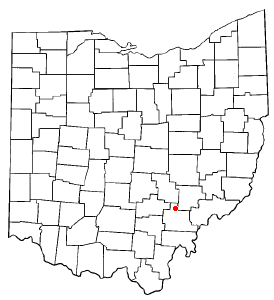
- Location of Trimble, Ohio

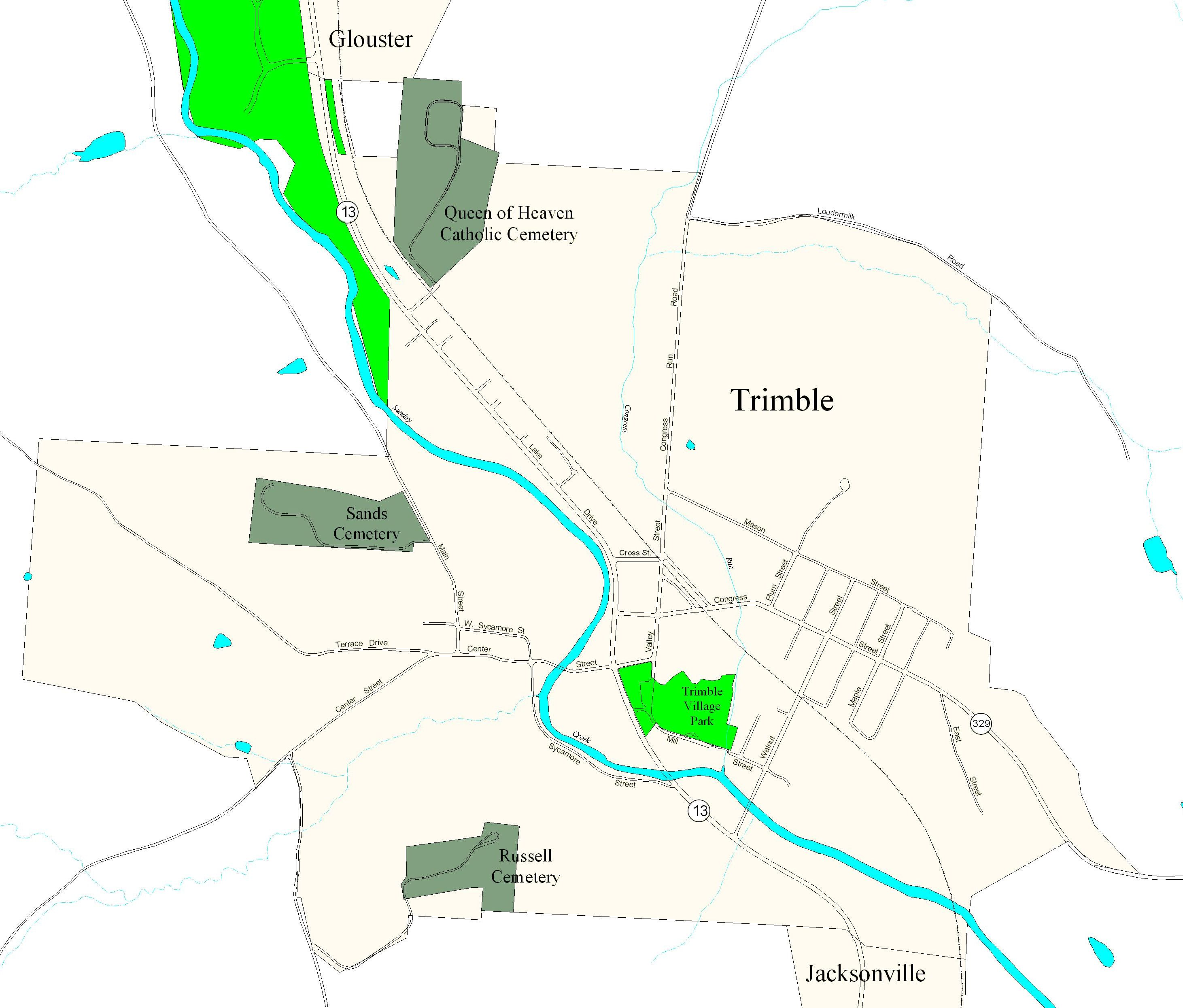
- Street map of Trimble
- Coordinates: 39°29′09″N 82°04′48″W
- Country: United States
- State: Ohio
- County: Athens
- Township: Trimble

Area
  - Total: 0.69 sq mi (1.79 km^{2})
  - Land: 0.68 sq mi (1.76 km^{2})
  - Water: 0.012 sq mi (0.03 km^{2})
- Elevation: 673 ft (205 m)

Population (2020)
  - Total: 329
  - Density: 483.5/sq mi (186.67/km^{2})
- Time zone: UTC-5 (Eastern (EST))
  - Summer (DST): UTC-4 (EDT)
- ZIP code: 45782
- Area code: 740
- FIPS code: 39-77406
- GNIS feature ID: 2400003

Trimble is a village in Trimble Township, Athens County, Ohio, United States. The population was 329 at the 2020 census.

== History ==
Trimble was originally called Oxford when it was platted in the early 1800s. It was later renamed Trimble in honor of Governor Allen Trimble. A post office named Trimble has been continuously operating since 1839.

Like many nearby villages, Trimble grew as a coal-mining community during the late 19th and early 20th centuries, centered along Sunday Creek.

== Infrastructure ==
Trimble lies along Sunday Creek and is part of the regional GoBus network, a rural public transit service connecting nearby towns with Athens and Columbus.

== Geography ==
Trimble is located along Sunday Creek.

According to the United States Census Bureau, the village has a total area of 0.67 square miles (1.74 km^{2}), of which 0.66 square miles (1.71 km^{2}) is land and 0.01 square miles (0.03 km^{2}) is water.

Trimble is one of three bordering incorporated villages in northern Athens County, all of which began as coal mining towns. Just north of Trimble is Glouster, and just south of Trimble is Jacksonville.

== Demographics ==
Historical population
Census	Pop.	Note	%±
1870	81		—
1880	121		49.4%
1890	440		263.6%
1900	625		42.0%
1910	711		13.8%
1920	806		13.4%
1930	680		−15.6%
1940	686		0.9%
1950	566		−17.5%
1960	481		−15.0%
1970	542		12.7%
1980	579		6.8%
1990	441		−23.8%
2000	466		5.7%
2010	390		−16.3%
2020	329		−15.6%
U.S. Decennial Census

=== 2010 census ===
As of the census of 2010, there were 390 people, 145 households, and 103 families living in the village. The population density was 590.9 inhabitants per square mile (228.1/km^{2}). There were 171 housing units at an average density of 259.1 per square mile (100.0/km^{2}). The racial makeup of the village was 97.4% White, 0.3% Native American, and 2.3% from two or more races.

There were 145 households, of which 34.5% had children under the age of 18 living with them, 47.6% were married couples living together, 17.9% had a female householder with no husband present, 5.5% had a male householder with no wife present, and 29.0% were non-families. 20.7% of all households were made up of individuals, and 7.6% had someone living alone who was 65 years of age or older. The average household size was 2.69 and the average family size was 3.04.

The median age in the village was 39.5 years. 22.8% of residents were under the age of 18; 11.6% were between the ages of 18 and 24; 24% were from 25 to 44; 25.6% were from 45 to 64; and 15.9% were 65 years of age or older. The gender makeup of the village was 52.3% male and 47.7% female.

=== 2000 census ===
As of the census of 2000, there were 466 people, 175 households, and 121 families living in the village. The population density was 713.1 inhabitants per square mile (275.3/km^{2}). There were 195 housing units at an average density of 298.4 per square mile (115.2/km^{2}). The racial makeup of the village was 98.50% White, 0.21% Asian, and 1.29% from two or more races.

There were 175 households, out of which 38.3% had children under the age of 18 living with them, 49.1% were married couples living together, 17.1% had a female householder with no husband present, and 30.3% were non-families. 22.9% of all households were made up of individuals, and 10.3% had someone living alone who was 65 years of age or older. The average household size was 2.66 and the average family size was 3.14.

In the village, the population was spread out, with 30.7% under the age of 18, 9.4% from 18 to 24, 27.3% from 25 to 44, 23.8% from 45 to 64, and 8.8% who were 65 years of age or older. The median age was 33 years. For every 100 females there were 99.1 males. For every 100 females age 18 and over, there were 86.7 males.

The median income for a household in the village was $30,500, and the median income for a family was $30,938. Males had a median income of $29,107 versus $21,667 for females. The per capita income for the village was $11,437. About 22.0% of families and 26.1% of the population were below the poverty line, including 30.8% of those under age 18 and 21.6% of those age 65 or over.
