= Land lab =

Outdoor laboratory for biological study

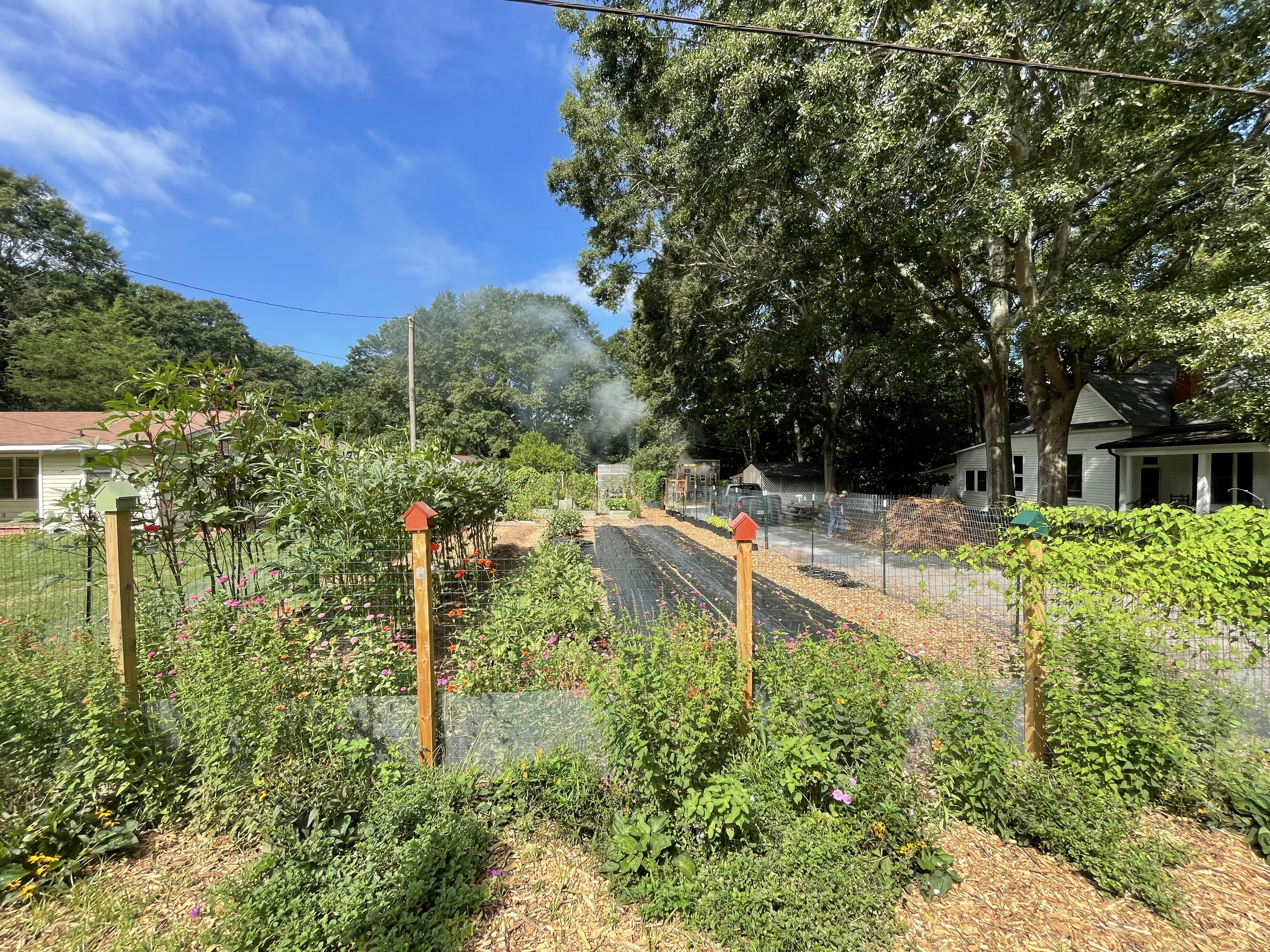
An educational land lab with pollinators gardens, bird houses, and vegetable garden space within an urban setting.

A land lab is an area of land that has been set aside for use in biological studies. Thus, it is literally an outdoor laboratory based on an area of land.

Studies may be elementary or advanced. For instance, students may simply be given the task of identifying all the tree species in a land lab, or an advanced student may be doing an intensive survey of the microbial life forms found in a soil sample.

Hands on, tangible, project-base learning is a key aspect of land labs within an educational context. Land labs can exist anywhere with outdoor access: educational campuses, residential neighborhoods, peri-urban settings, urban settings, or even a small courtyard. The driving principle behind land lab education is getting outside and interacting with the world directly.

Land labs are often marked out in plots or transects for studies. A plot may be any size, usually marked out in square meters. This allows for more intensive, delimited studies of changes and inventories of biota. Transects are straight lines at which, at intervals, measurements are taken for a profile of the ecological community.

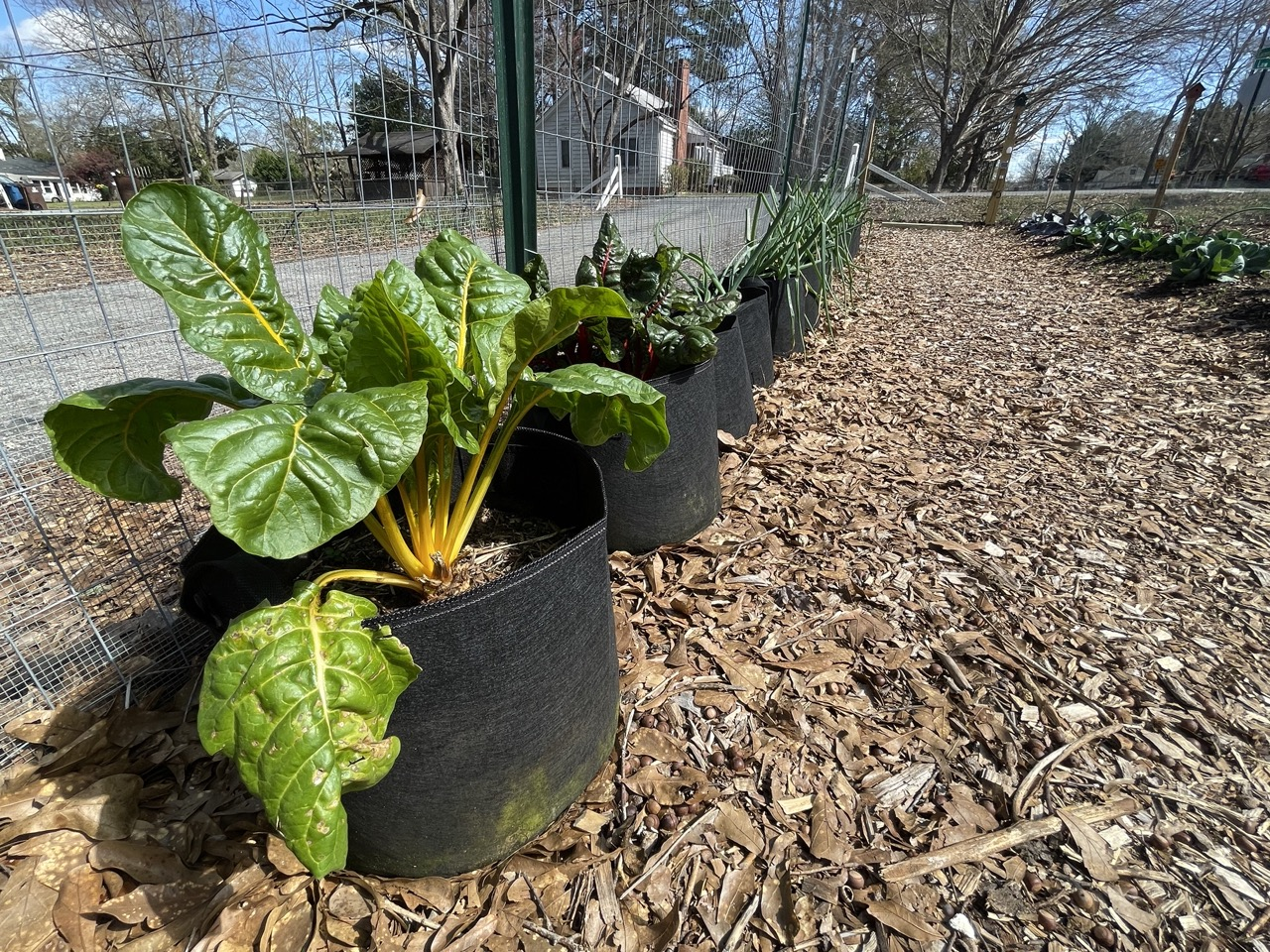
Grow bags provide a flexible and mobile gardening environment for land labs. Chard and kale are growing in these grow bags.

Land labs serve an important role in giving students access to a natural environment to observe native plants and wildlife, apply STEM concepts with hands on projects, and build a better understanding of how critical biodiversity is for ecological health.

== Common educational projects conducted at a land lab often include ==
- Surveying pollinator species in pollinator gardens or in the native flora
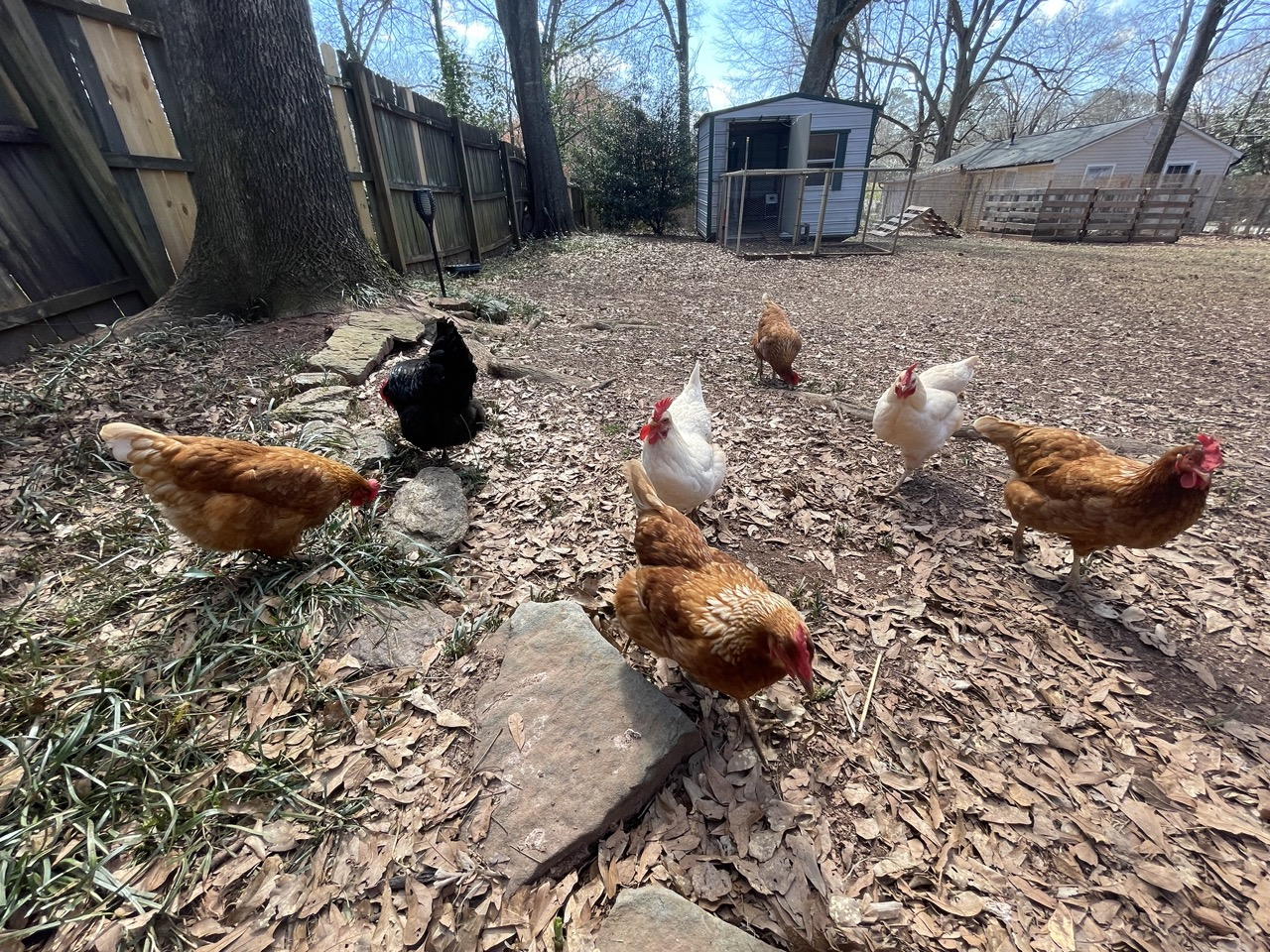
- Free range chickens are an important part of the ecosystem for a local land lab. The chickens eat insects, greens, and grain. They produce eggs and manure. Their manure is used as a garden fertilizer.
  Restoring old agricultural land back to original landscapes such as: wetlands, prairie, or forest
- Composting biomass to rebuild healthy soil
- Maintaining beehives or other pollinator habitats for moths, ground bees, and other pollinators
- Recording weather conditions to better understand the microclimate
- Conducting nature studies to identify and observe local flora and fauna
- Planting native trees, grasses, and flowers to increase biodiversity
- Encouraging native riparian plant growth along ponds and streams
- Installing bird houses, bat houses and owl houses
- Holding art classes where students can paint flora, fauna and landscapes
- Collecting and removing trash and other man-made pollutants
- Designing low-impact trails and paths for visitors to explore the land lab

== Studying humans needs and sustainability in land labs ==
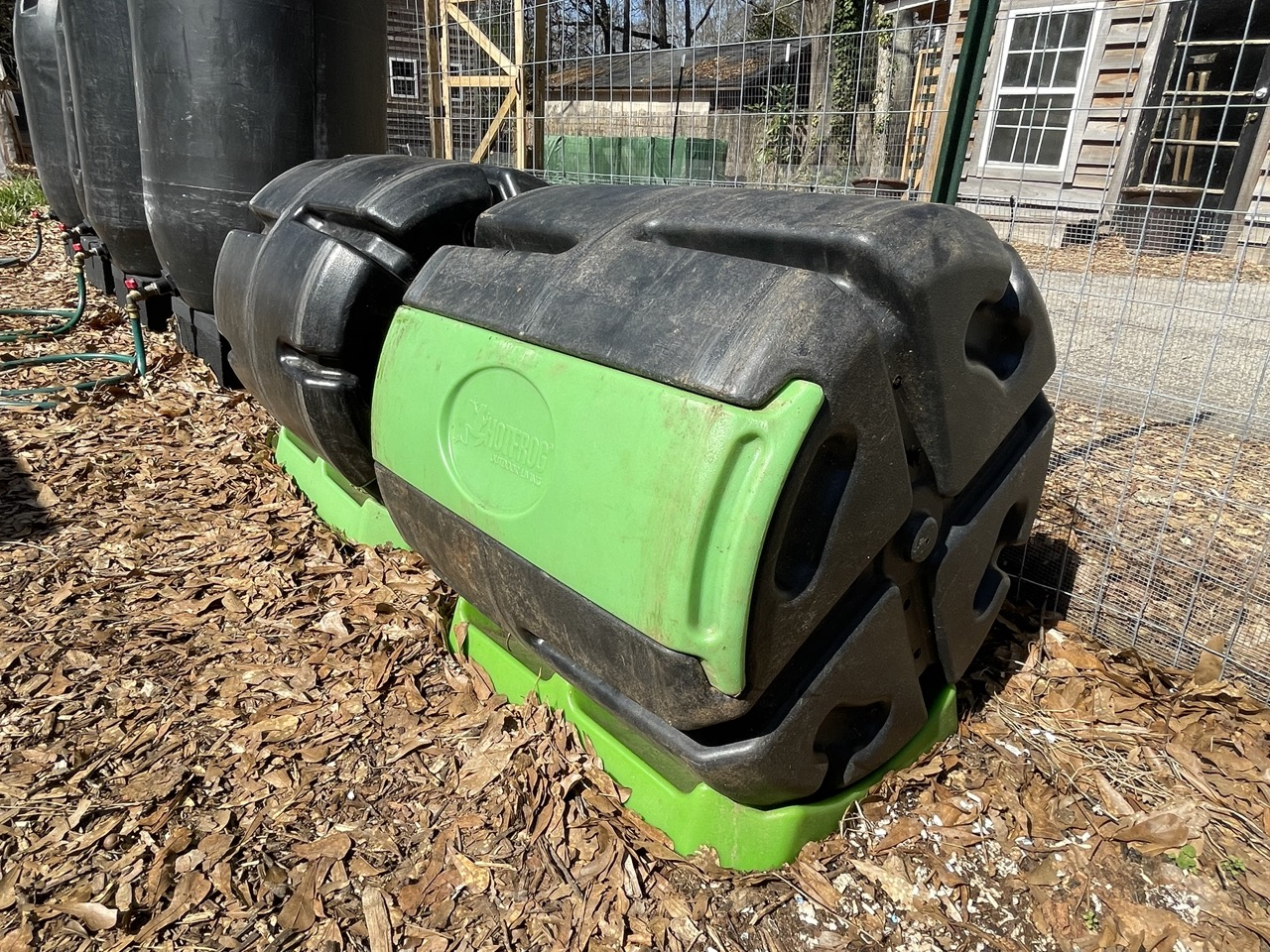
Compost rollers are used to cleanly produce rich, organic compost for sustainable gardens. Food waste, veggie scraps, grass clippings, cardboard, biochar, leaves and other biomass are mixed together. These inputs have varying levels of carbon and nitrogen which are required for producing compost. Microbes and insects break down these inputs into a rich soil amendment to help fertilize plants sustainably.

Land labs provide students of all ages with hands-on opportunities to explore sustainable methods for producing food, fiber, and energy. They can study various environmental topics, including biomass and biogas energy, solar power, permaculture, composting, and organic gardening.

By designing systems that mimic natural processes (biomimicry), we are able to produce food, fiber, and energy in more sustainable ways for local communities. Numerous environmental and economic benefits exist to growing food locally and producing energy locally. These biomimicry inspired systems are circular in nature. Nothing is wasted, as the outputs of one circular system become the inputs of another.

== Circular systems in land labs ==
Circular system experiments, promoting a circular economy, are a natural fit for educational land labs. Circular systems function by ensuring that nothing is wasted. Every output of a system becomes an input for another system.

For example: Food scraps feed chickens, chicken manure fertilizes the garden, the garden grows more vegetables, food scraps are then available from the vegetables to feed chickens.

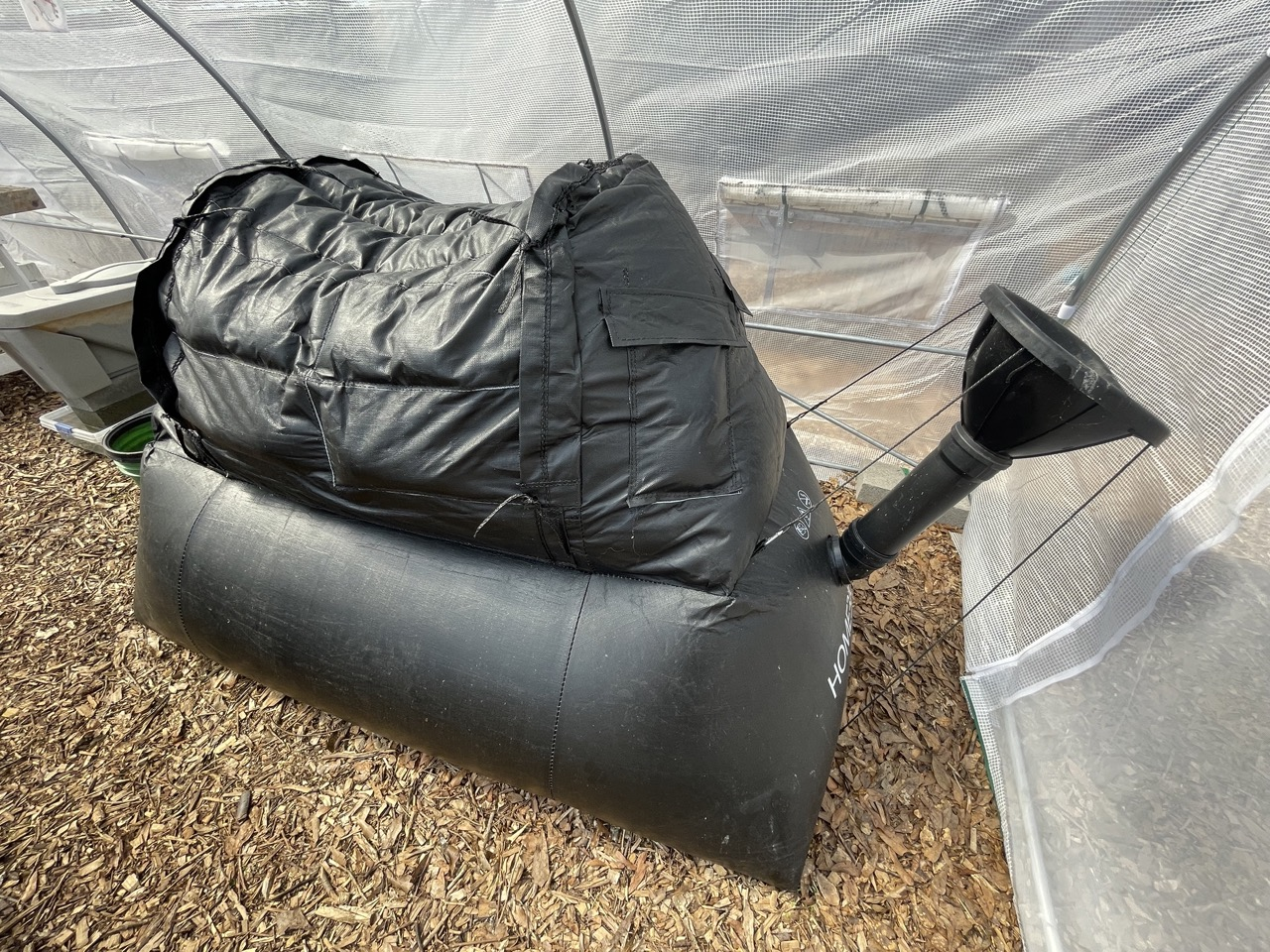
A methane digester intakes food waste, water, manure and other biomass. Methanogens in the water then consume nutrients in the organic slurry, and methane gas is released. The methane gas is captured, stored and pressurized, and then is used to power a gas stove for cooking. Liquid fertilizer is produced as a byproduct of this process. This is a fantastic example of sustainable, local energy.

Circular systems that are well-suited for land labs include:

- Biogas methane digesters for generating clean cooking fuel and liquid fertilizer for gardens
- Composting rollers for composting leaves, grass clippings, & food scraps
- Raising black soldier fly larvae on food waste to become feed for chickens or fish
- Solar panels for providing on-site power
- Free range chickens for providing eggs and manure
- Greenhouses for growing mushrooms and seedlings
- Raised beds for market garden vegetables
- Beehives for garden pollination, honey, and wax
- Rotationally grazed pastures for goats, cattle, pigs, sheep, etc
- Biochar production to improve soil quality and sequester carbon
- Aquaponics systems for growing fish and greens symbiotically
- Rainwater collection systems for retaining water for gardens

== Multi-disciplinary environment within land labs ==
Land labs help to form an ecosystem well suited for long-term project-based learning. Students, teachers, and community members can participate in multi-disciplinary activities ranging from land restoration, animal husbandry, gardening, weather analysis to outdoor art studies.

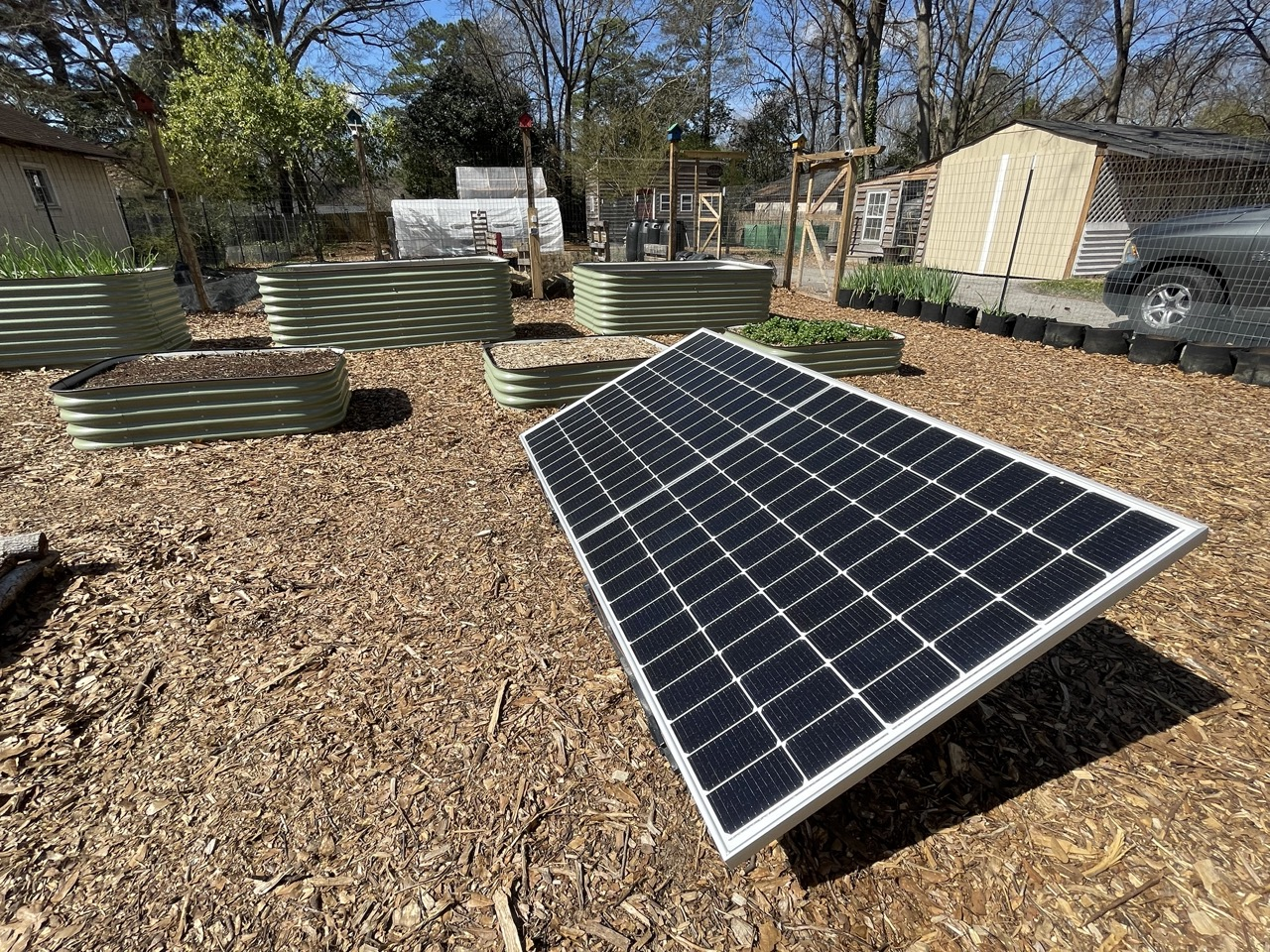
Photovoltaic solar panels provide clean electricity for this land lab. Using local power to operate garden tools, sensors, cameras, and water pumps provides a great example of sustainable energy for students.

The multi-disciplinary context within a land lab is perfect for cross-curricular education. The following disciplines and subjects can all tie into land lab activities in an integrated fashion:

- Ecology - nature studies, increasing biodiversity, studying water cycle
- Biology - gardening, agriscience projects, botany
- Sustainable Agriculture - composting, permaculture, local food movement
- Engineering - building aquaponics, rainwater collection, animal shelters
- Chemistry - methane digesters, plant fertilization, solar power
- Life Sciences - carbon cycle, water cycle, composting biomass
- Animal Husbandry - free range chickens, goats, apiary
- Climate Studies - weather observation, weather logging
- History & Culture Studies - local food culture, history of agriculture, natural resources
- Culinary Arts - cooking garden produce using clean energy like biomass, biogas, or solar power
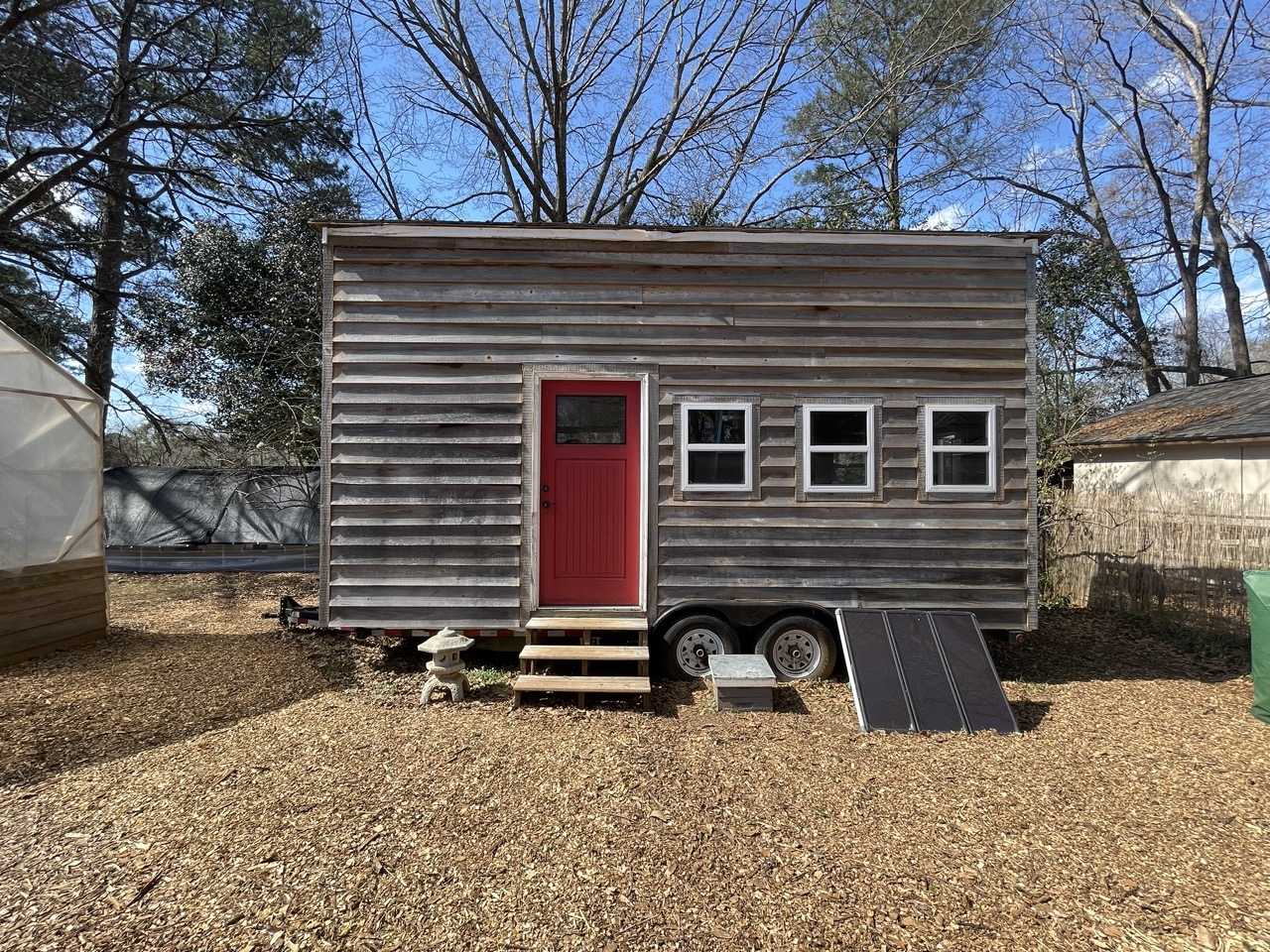
- This tiny house on wheels provides a good example of more sustainable shelters. Built from locally produced cypress wood, this tiny house on wheels gives students a sense of what a living system integrated into solar power, rainwater collection, and sustainable utilities looks like.
  Multi media arts - designing pollinator landscapes, bird houses, bat houses, murals
  - Painting - nature studies, murals
  - Pottery - watering pots, plant pots
  - Wood working - pollinator houses, chicken coop

== Goals and outcomes of land lab education experiences ==
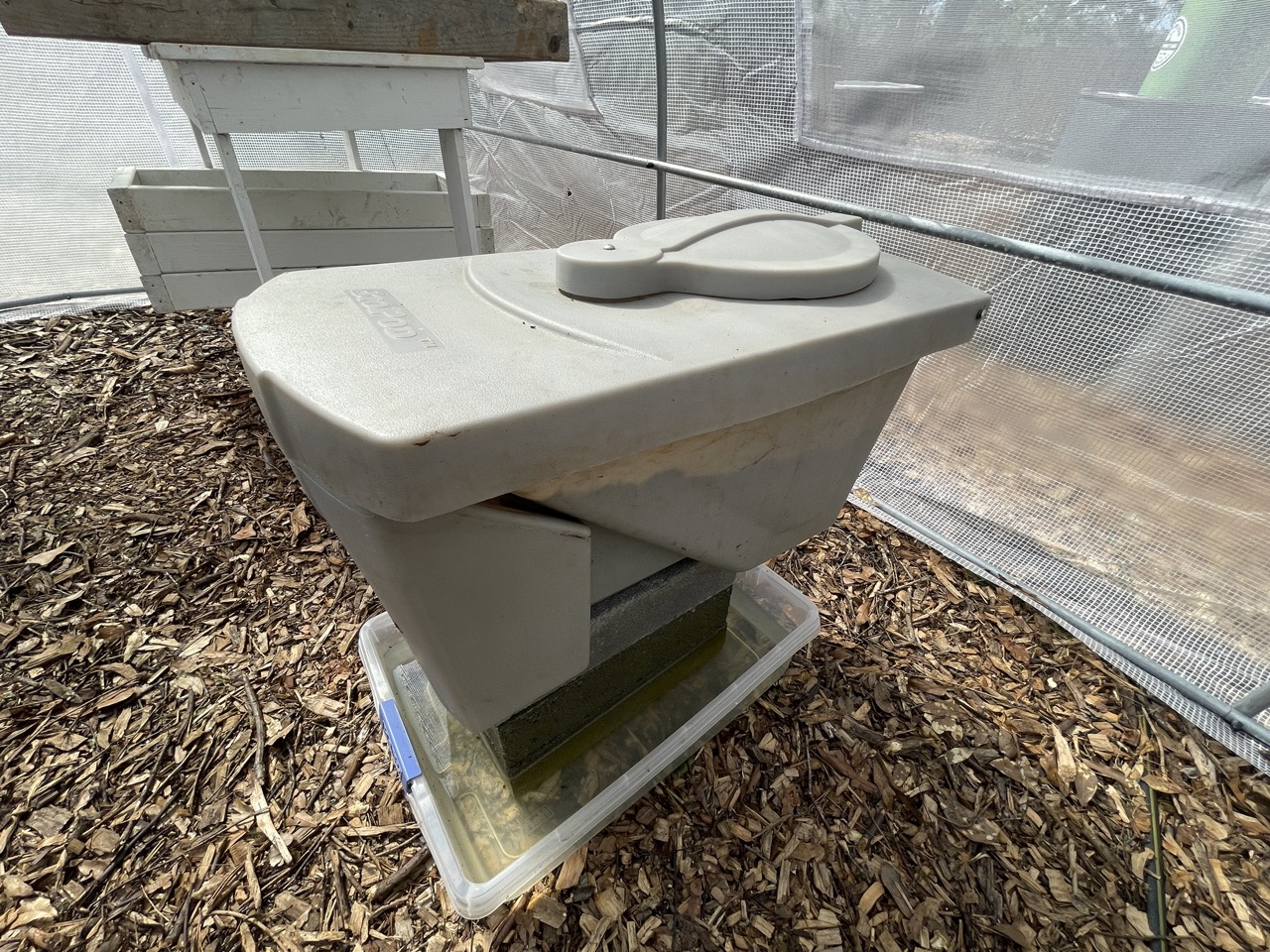
Black soldier fly larvae (BSF) as raised in this container. As they mature the grubs climb up and fall into the harvest bucket. BSF are a protein and fat rich food source for chickens, fish and wild birds. BSF can be fed coffee grounds, food scraps / waste, and even manure. BSF are a sustainable insect feedstock.

Land labs exist as perpetual educational projects that can span years to decades or more. Common goals within a land lab are often:

- Restoring degraded land back into a balanced, biodiverse state
- Establishing an environment for native flora and fauna to thrive
- Building deep, rich soil with an active microbiome
- Growing local produce, herbs, and flowers
- Raising livestock with sustainable, ethical methods
- Producing healthy food for local communities
- Producing local energy to power the land lab operations
- Inspiring young people to care about biodiversity, agriculture, and nature
- Building real-life, practical STEM skills for students and adults
- Building strong communities around unique outdoor projects in nature
- Educating people about the benefits and simple joys found in gardening

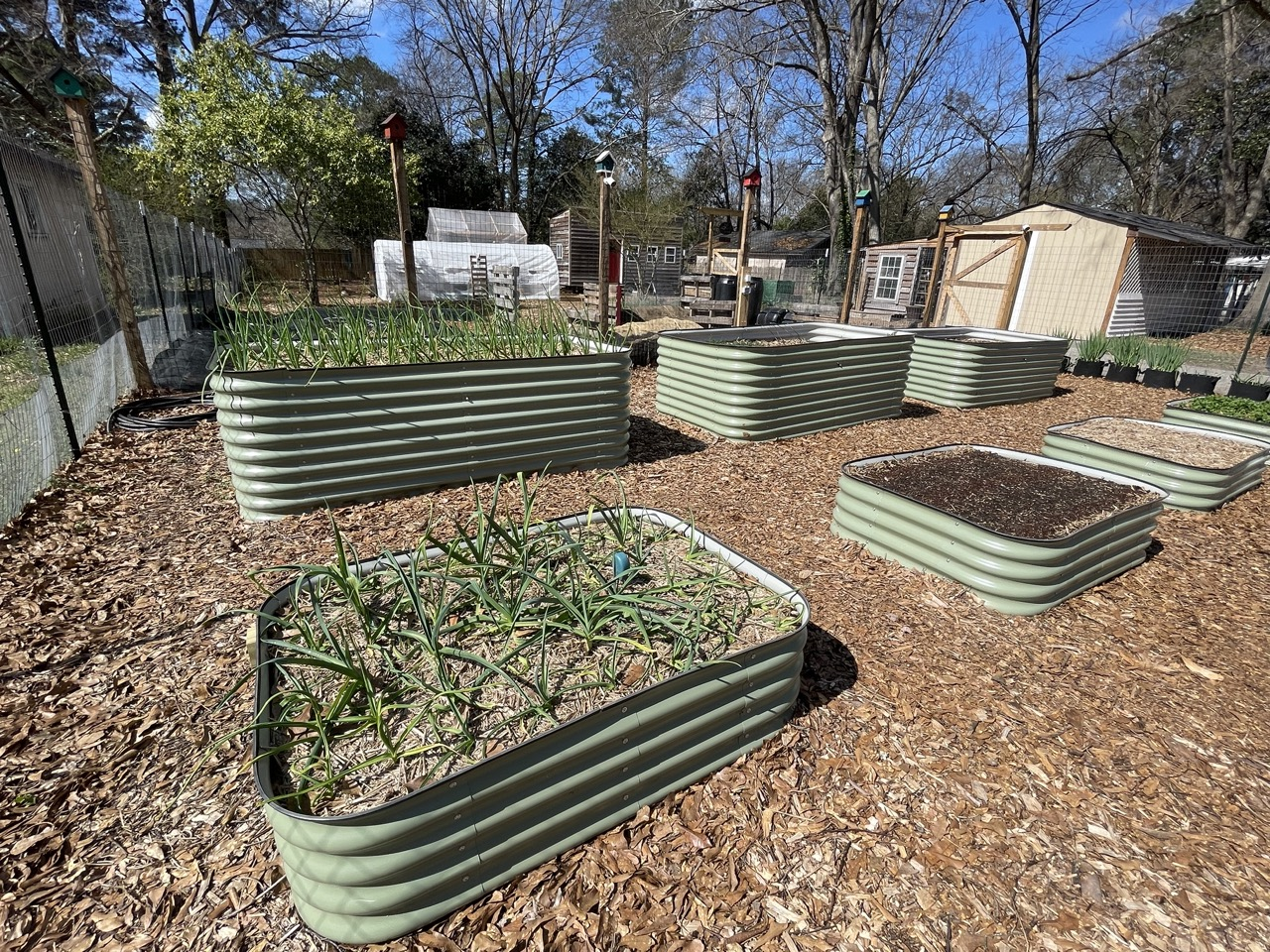
Green onions and garlic are growing in these raised metal garden beds. Raised beds are a great addition to a land lab as they make gardening more accessible for people of all ages.

== Footprints and Sizes of Land Labs ==
Land labs can be designed in all shapes and sizes. The key attributes of a land lab are typically the following:

- Building an outdoor learning area designated for cross-curricular studies in a STEM environment
- Establishing a focus on increasing biodiversity and restoring local environmental features
- Educating people about meeting humans needs sustainably through agriculture, energy production, shelter, and sanitation

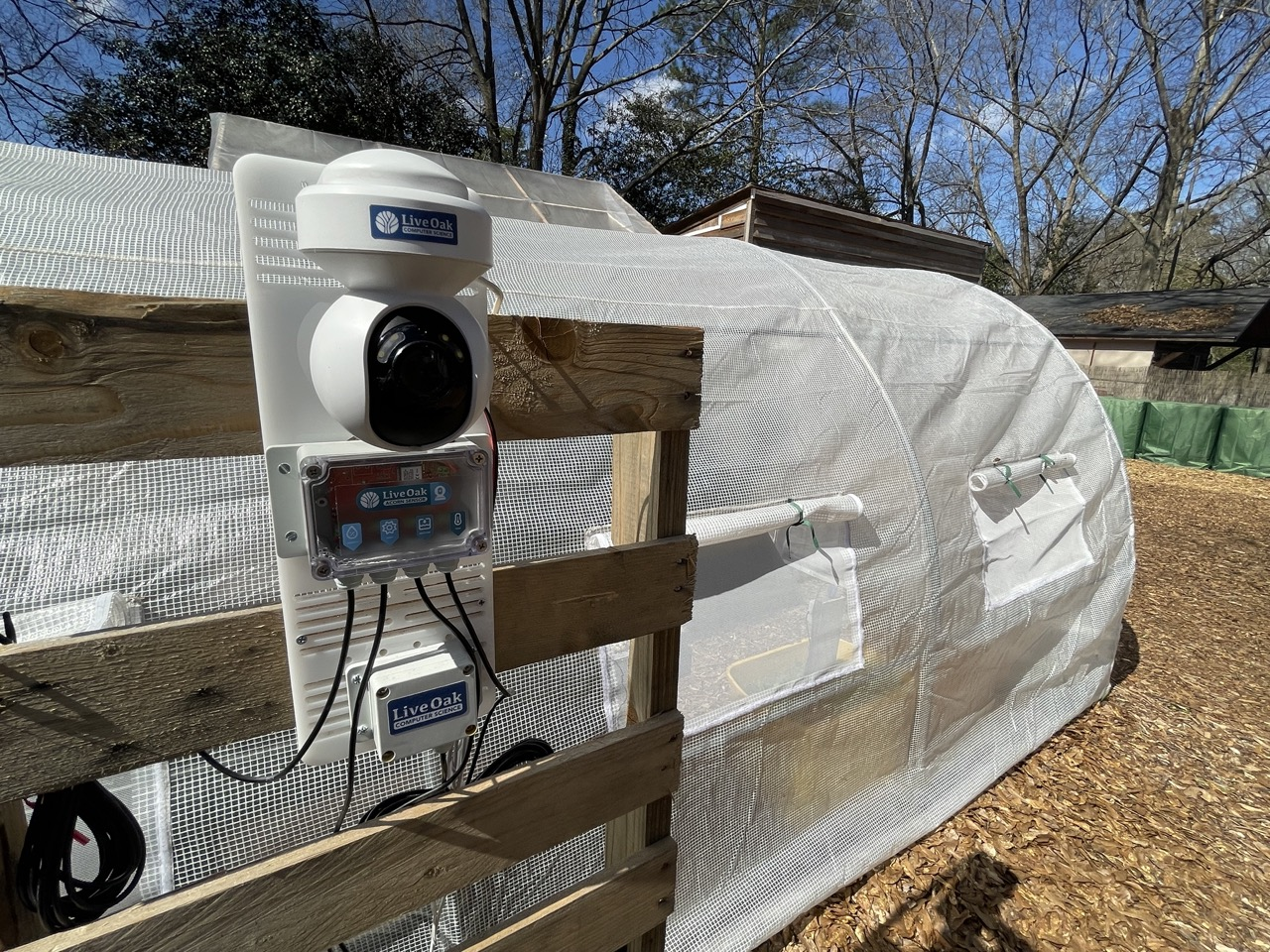
Cameras and environmental sensors help students and teachers monitor land lab conditions in real time. This sensor takes photos of growing plants, records humidity / temperature / soil moisture and light levels.

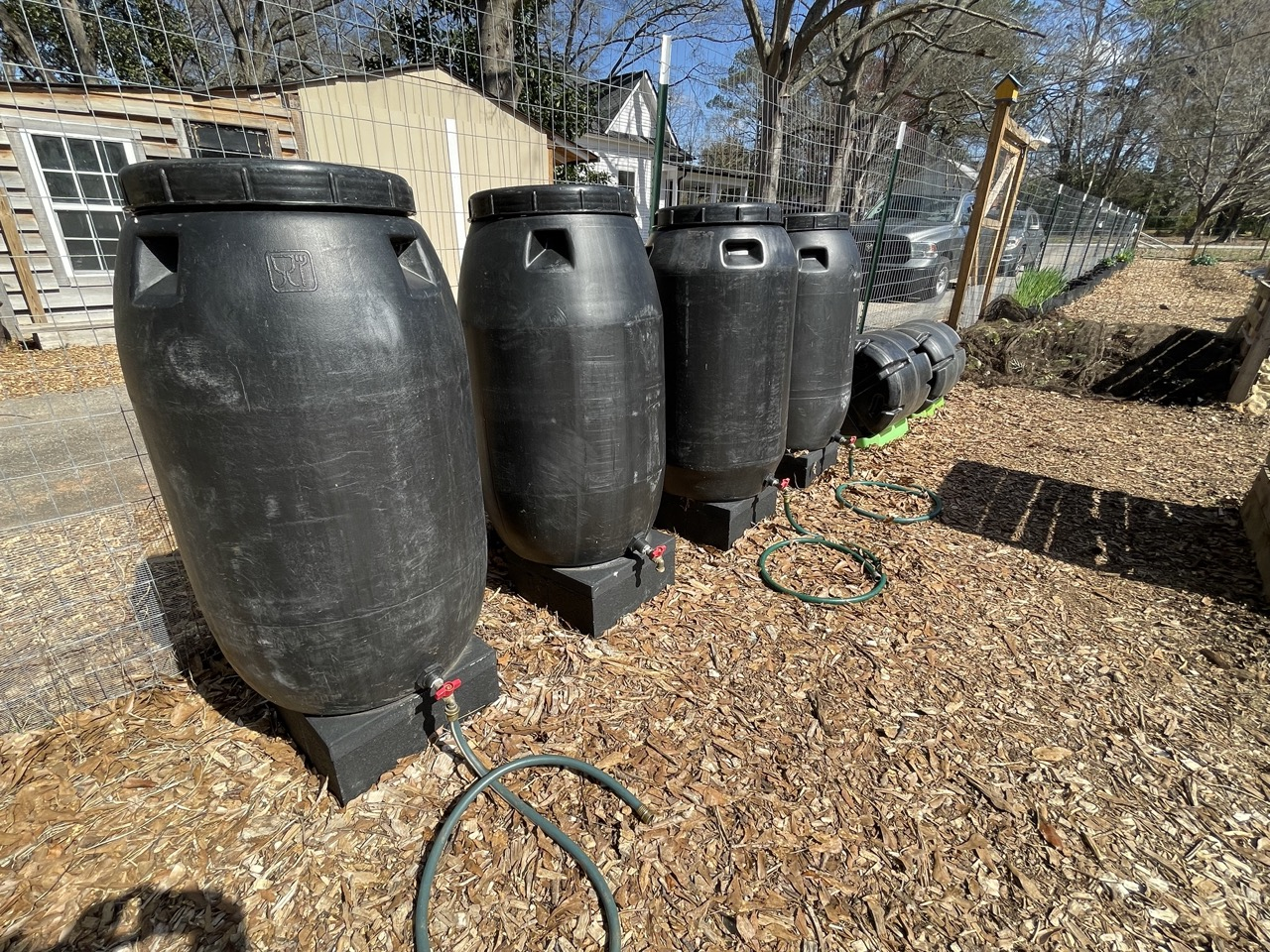
Organic Liquid fertilizer can be produced by adding green biomass to tanks of water, adding leaf mold, and then allowing anaerobic fermentation and decay to occur. The microbes break down nutrients in the biomass which can then be used to fertilize garden plants.

A small land lab could be as little as a courtyard, balcony garden, or a designated patch of land outside of a classroom window. Conversely, larger land lab could encompass hundreds of acres. The ideal size for a flexible land lab space allowing for many different ecological activities and circular systems is between 1/4 of an acre to 5 acres.

== Sustainable societal solutions originating from land labs ==
Land labs are real-life environments by design. The project-based environment encourages students, teachers, and community members to experiment with ecological solutions that can be implemented on a small scale.

Ideally, the solutions and systems implemented in a land lab are transferred beyond the land lab and into the surrounding community. Composting, rainwater catchment, food-waste upcycling with methane digesters and BSF, local food production, harnessing of solar power, and other land lab systems can all be implemented throughout a community at various scales: residential, schools, community gardens, and local businesses.

The purpose of a land lab is to allow students to develop, implement, and learn about practical, sustainable solutions for addressing the five basic physiological needs all humans have:

1. The need for clean water
2. The need for healthy food
3. The need for shelter
4. The need for energy
5. The need for sanitation

Our industrial systems of providing food, water, energy, shelter, and sanitation have inherent weaknesses to their centralized models. Long supply chains, fossil-fuel dependence, environmental damage, and the fragmented production of goods are common traits to industrial models. Land labs tie these 5 basic human needs together in integrated systems.

Permaculture is a concept of integrating these human needs into local, ecological, human-scale systems. Land labs can be thought of as an education area for promoting creative solutions for meeting these needs, while ensuring the land and local ecology are being restored in the process.

Land labs provide students with real-world experiences to help change their behavior as consumers, and get them more involved with meeting their 5 physiological needs.

Land labs are focused on more on production than on consumption, aiming to improve provisioning of our five physiological requirements, and to educate and highlight issues surrounding food production.

When these 5 basic needs are abstracted away from consumers, it is easier for the underlying systems providing these needs to operate without supervision to ensure they are ethical and sustainable.

== Mental health benefits for students being outside ==
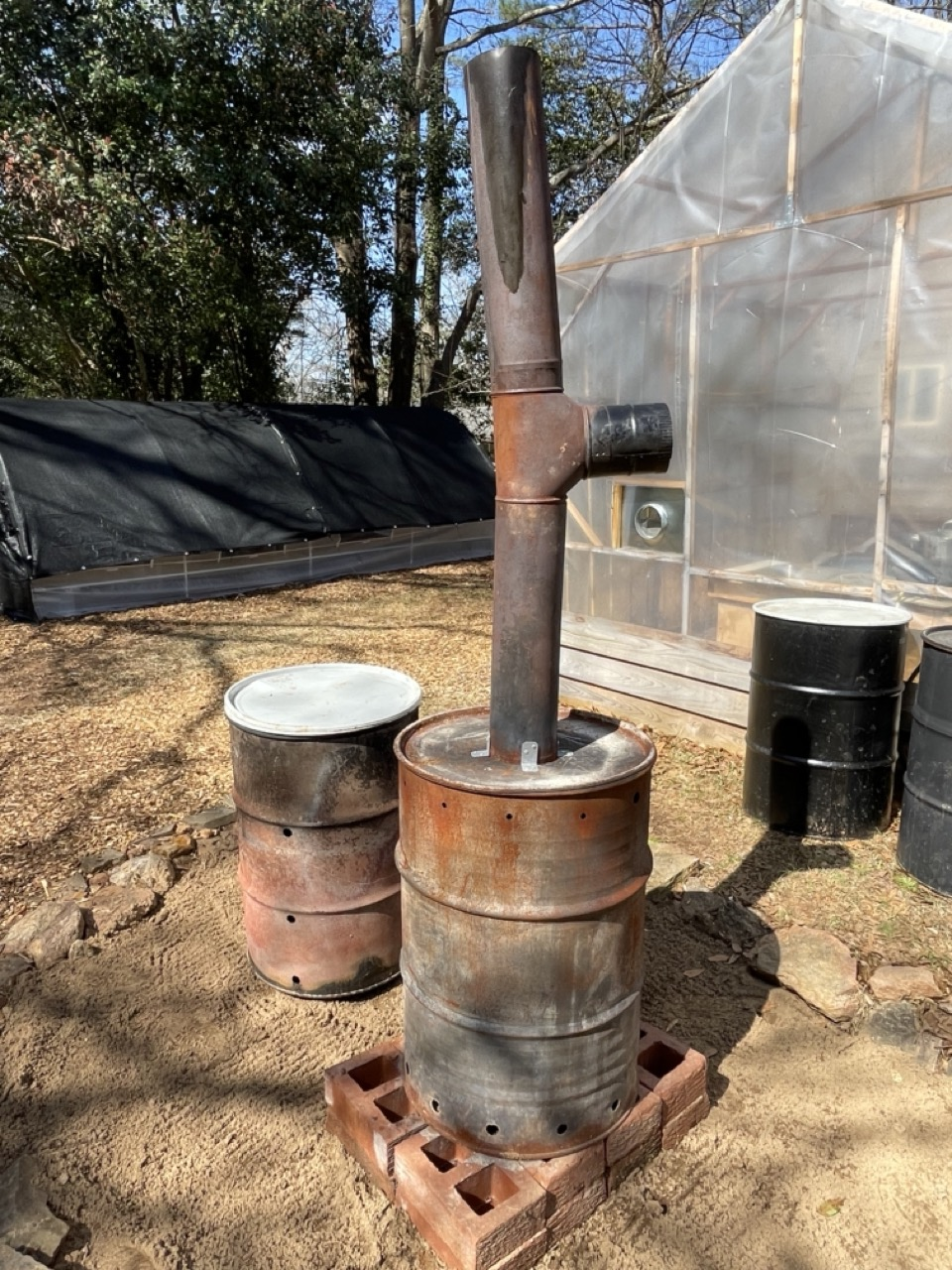
Biochar (charcoal) is produced in this double burn barrel. Chunks of woody biomass are placed within an inner barrel, feedstock to "cook" the inner biomass is placed around the inner barrel, and then the feedstock is ignited. This converts the woody biomass into almost pure carbon. The carbon biochar is then used to amend compost. This sequesters carbon, and provides a good home more microbes in the soil. Some advanced biochar units can capture the heat for heating homes, water, air, and even produce electricity with the aid of a stirling engine.

In today's digital world, many students spend inordinate amounts of time on a screen both at home and at school. Inherent limits exist to project based learning that takes place entirely behind a screen or within a classroom.

Land labs help break students out of a digital environment by providing much needed time outdoors. Studies have shown that as our digital landscape of social media has exploded in popularity, depression and mental struggles have increased dramatically in students.

Studies also show that student's mental health benefits immensely from being outdoors and participating in hands on projects with meaningful outcomes.

== Waste streams used in land labs ==
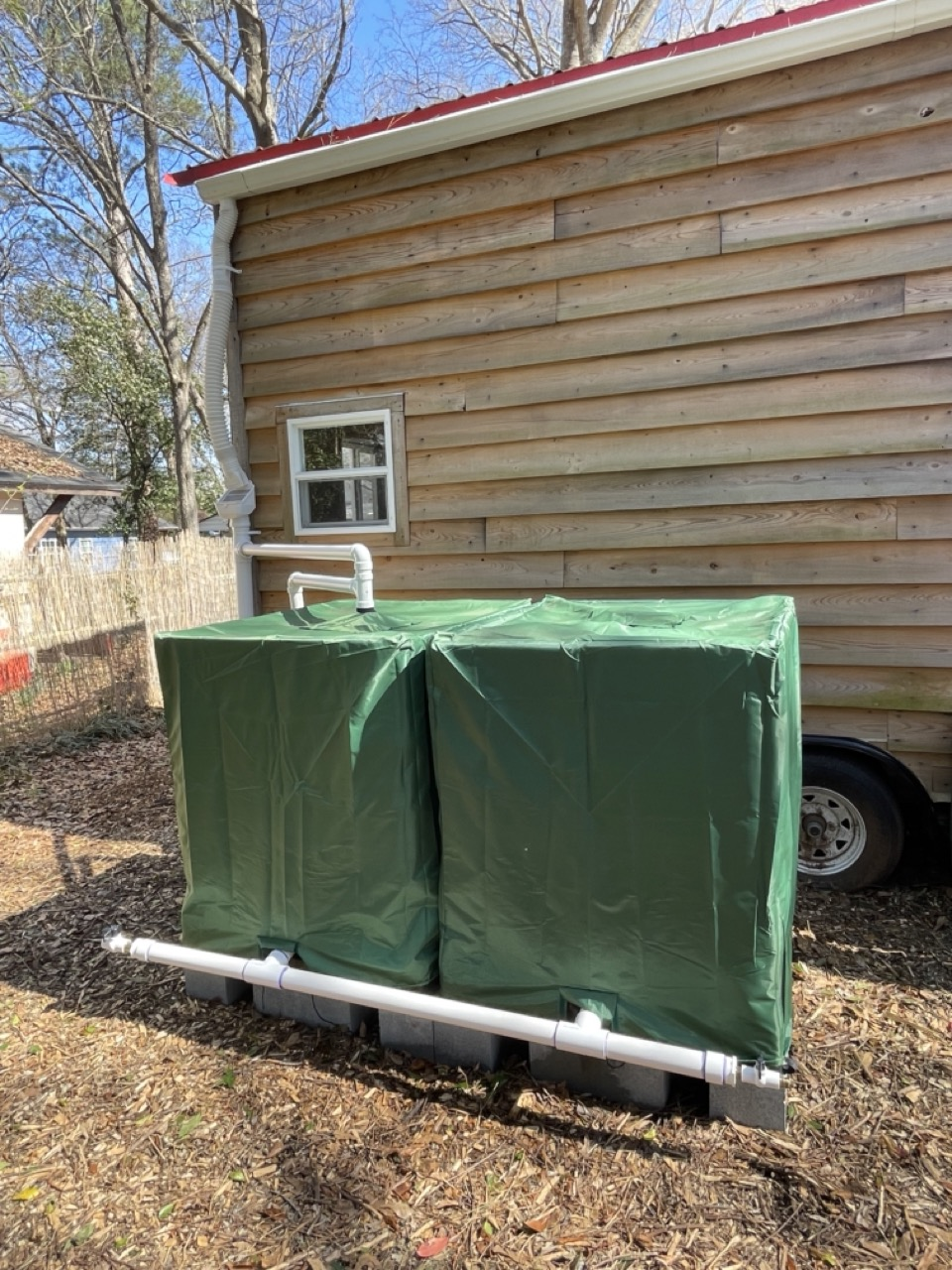
Rainwater is collected from a rooftop of a tiny house and then diverted into two 275 gallon IBC totes. This is an affordable way to capture water for the gardens, livestock, and other land lab uses.

Multiple types of local "waste" streams, that can often be obtained freely, can be used to supply a land lab with the raw materials to build soil, generate power, grow food, and restore biodiversity.

- Woodchips - Used for garden paths, mulch, composting & biochar. Often available from local tree companies or municipalities for free.
- Grass clippings - Used for compost and mulch. Available from neighbors and onsite.
- Leaves - Used for compost and mulch. Available from neighbors and onsite.
- Food waste - Used for composting, methane production, liquid fertilizer, and feeding BSF.
- Coffee grounds - Used for composting and BSF production.
- Pallets (Non-treated) - Used for making raised beds, biochar, composting bins, and other structures.
- IBC totes (Food grade) - Used for storing rainwater and liquid fertilizer.
- 5 Gallon Buckets - Used for collecting food waste, and other waste streams.
- Shredded paper - Used for composting.
- Shredded cardboard - Used for composting.
- Newspapers - Used for composting and mulching.
- Logs - Used for pollinator habitats. Freely availably from many tree companies.
- Reclaimed lumber (non treated) - Used for raised beds, biochar, and small building projects.
- Billboard tarps - Used for rainwater catchment, roofing, and shade cloths. Freely available from billboard companies.

Part of the process of building a land lab is developing relationships with local businesses, neighbors, restaurants, and community members to begin upcycling these wastes into the materials and systems needed within a land lab. Many people have a desire to help students who are working hard on a meaningful community project. Much of the materials listed above can be had for little to no cost as relationships are formed.
