= Burr Oak State Park =

Park in Ohio, USA

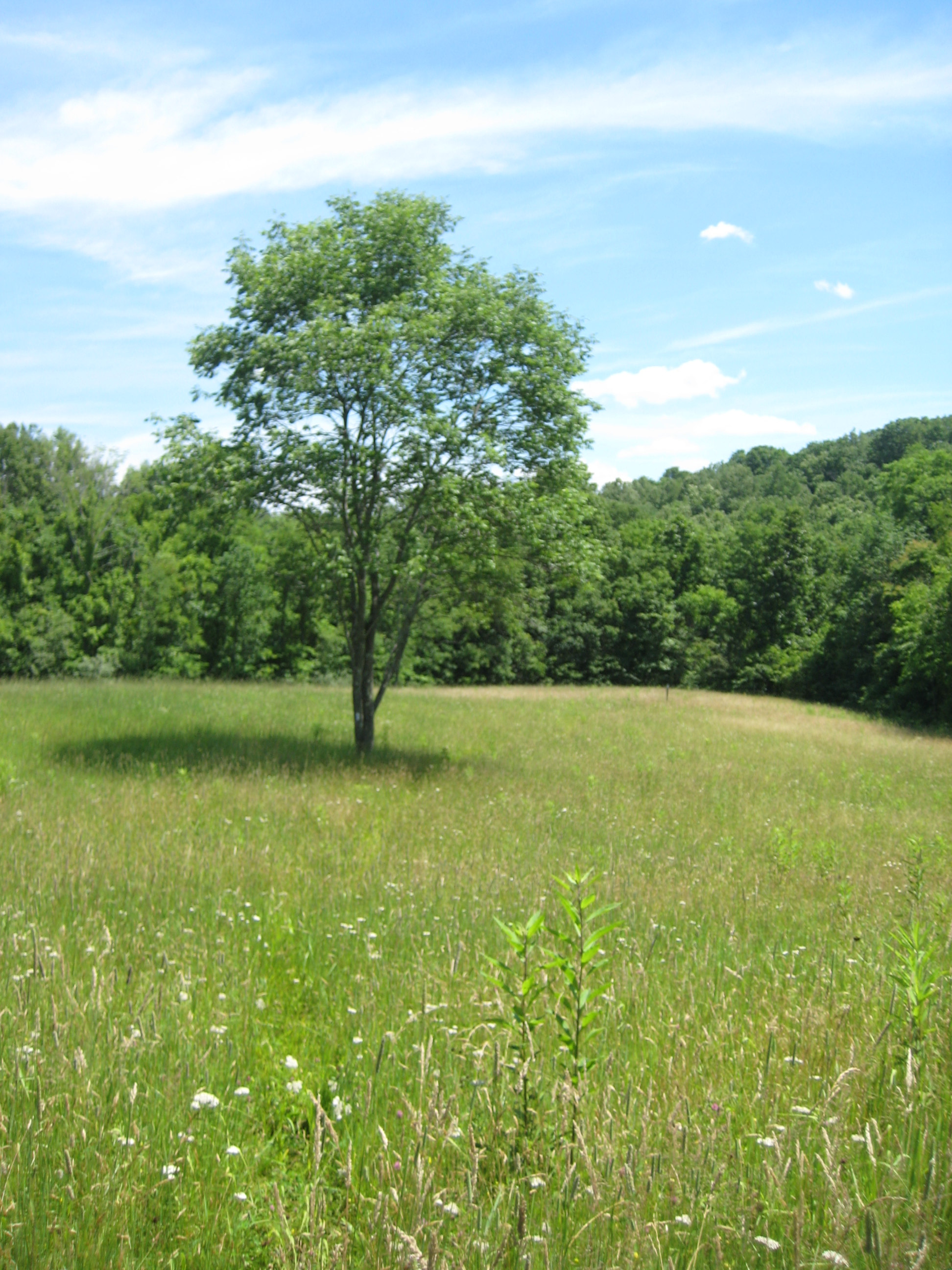

- Location within Ohio Location within the United States
- Location: Athens and Morgan counties, Ohio, United States
- Nearest town: Glouster, Ohio
- Coordinates: 39°31′51″N 82°02′07″W
- Area: Land: 2,593 acres (1,049 ha); Water: 664 acres (269 ha)
- Elevation: 820 feet (250 m)
- Established: 1952
- Administrator: Ohio Department of Natural Resources
- Designation: Ohio state park
- Website: Burr Oak State Park

Burr Oak State Park is a public recreation area located four miles (6.4 km) northeast of Glouster in the U.S. state of Ohio. The park sits mostly in Morgan County, with part extending into Athens County.

The state park is centered at Burr Oak Lake. The dam for the lake is federal property under the jurisdiction of the Army Corps of Engineers, and is named Tom Jenkins Dam. It was built in 1950 for flood control. The maximum depth of the lake is around thirty feet.

The lake and park are named for the burr oak tree, a variety of oak.

The area of the park is 2,593 acres (1,049 ha), while that of the lake is 664 acres (269 ha). The park was dedicated in 1952. The park borders the Wayne National Forest and the Sunday Creek State Wildlife Area.

== Tom Jenkins Dam ==
The Tom Jenkins Dam is a rolled-earth fill structure constructed to control flooding, provide recreation, as well as drinking water for the Athens, Ohio area. Construction began under the Army Corps of Engineers in March 1948 and was completed in February 1950. The dam stands approximately 75 feet (23 m) high and spans 944 feet (288 m) in length, containing roughly half a million cubic yards of earth fill. The created Burr Oak Reservoir that has a maximum depth of thirty feet.

== Activities and amenities ==
The park offers boating, swimming, picnicking, fishing, hunting, camping, cabins, conference center, and lodge. The Buckeye Trail passes around the lake, and the North Country Trail is coincident with the Buckeye in this location. The park features 28 miles (45 km) of hiking trails and 7 miles (11 km) of hiking trails. Historically, the park has maintained open areas along roadways as wildflower meadow-type areas.
