= Millfield Mine disaster =

1930 mining disaster in Athens County, Ohio

Millfield Mine Disaster
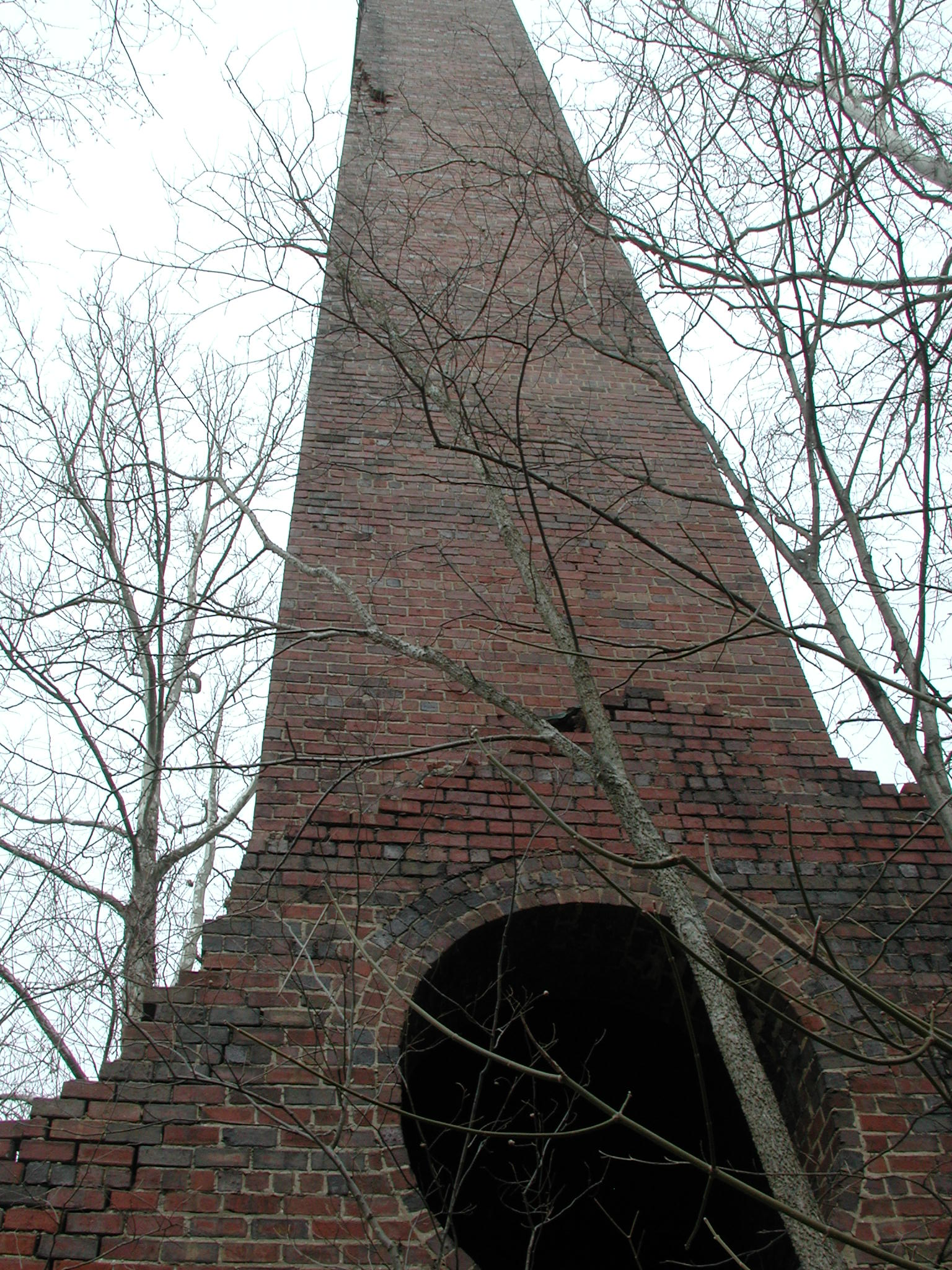
- Sunday Creek Mine No. 6
- Date: November 5, 1930
- Location: Millfield, Ohio; 39.433236°N 82.077614°W
- Cause: Accumulation of gas sparked by electrical arc between fallen trolley wire and rail
- Deaths: 82

The Millfield Mine disaster occurred November 5, 1930, at the Sunday Creek Coal Company Poston Mine Number 6 in Dover Township, Athens County, Ohio. It was the state's worst mine disaster, killing 82 men. Sigmund Kozma was the last remaining survivor of the disaster, dying on January 3, 2009.

== The Disaster ==
Poston Mine Number 6 was said to be the Sunday Creek Coal Company's best mine and safest in the Hocking Valley. The explosion occurred 10,200 feet from the main shaft around 11:45 am. It was the result of an accumulation of gas in section 6 North, which was known for being gassy. The ignition was believed to be caused by an electrical arc between a fallen trolley wire and the rail. The section of the trolley rail where the explosion occurred was broken and therefore inactive. There was no reason for power to be on that line. The explosion caused many of the walls to cave in, wrecking the interior. It was so powerful that cars were pulled off tracks and beams were twisted up to 760 feet from the main shaft. Equipment was also found scorched near the explosion site.

The mine had recently undergone improvement and they were in the process of making more. The president of Sunday Creek Coal Company, W.E. Tytus, was giving other top executives a tour of the new safety equipment at the time of the explosion. They entered the main shaft half an hour previous to the explosion and had made it about one and a half miles into the mine. These men were killed in the disaster.

== Rescue ==
There were about 250 men at the mine that day and many of them were able escape after the explosion. Nearly 120 men escaped from the interior of the mine one way or another. Many of them used the ventilation shafts as exits. Most of the men lost in the disaster died from carbon monoxide asphyxiation. Only two men were believed to have been killed by serious burns from explosion. Distress calls were made to Columbus, Nelsonville, Cambridge, and Pittsburgh. Twenty-four Red Cross nurses, local doctors, and Salvation Army volunteers came to help the injured. About four hours after the explosion, the Chief Inspector, W.E. Smith, of the United States Bureau of Mines and three other inspectors arrived with mine rescue teams and equipment. Ten hours after the explosion, a rescue team found 19 men that barricaded themselves from the gas after the explosion. They used sheets of burlap, mud and sticks to protect themselves from the carbon monoxide. Only two of them were found conscious, but all survived. They were about three miles from the shaft entrance. Foreman John Dean was responsible for saving these men. He led the survivors to a ventilation partition used to protect them and risked his life in several trips.

A dozen mules were brought in to retrieve the bodies and wreckage from the mine because it lost power after the explosion. It was important to work fast because there was fear of a second explosion. It wasn't until midnight that the first bodies were recovered. Seventy-three employees, five officials, and four visitors made up the eighty-two men that died in the disaster.

== Aftermath ==
Sunday Creek Coal Company turned a storage room, pool hall, and store into temporary morgues. With a population of only about 1,500, the community of Millfield was profoundly affected; many families in the small community lost someone. The disaster created 59 widows and 154 orphans, and 14 families lost multiple family members. Many of those lucky enough to escape the mine suffered from poor health afterwards. The mine was not cleared of carbon monoxide until November 9, 1930. It was reopened about one month after the disaster and remained functioning until 1945. The Ohio State Mining Department investigated the cause of the explosion and later stated that Sunday Creek Coal Company was not responsible in regards to the orders, regulations, and recommendations in place at the time.

== Legacy ==
The disaster attracted national press coverage and international attention, and it prompted improvement of Ohio's mine safety laws in 1931. A monument was erected in 1975 near the Millfield disaster site with the names of the men that were lost and the smokestack at Mine No. 6 still stands today. The Millfield Mine Memorial Committee was started in 1973 to honor the dead and remember the tragedy in their community. They hold an annual memorial service.

== Sigmund Kozma ==
Sigmund Kozma, who was 16 at the time he survived the explosion, was recently identified as the last living survivor of the Millfield Mine disaster. He was loading coal with his father and twelve others about 500 feet from the blast. These men barricaded themselves from the poisonous gas and climbed up a ventilation shaft. It took them three hours to escape the mine. He was featured in a documentary of the explosion by Justin Zimmerman, entitled "Meeting Again". Sigmund Kozma died on January 3, 2009, coincidentally on the same day as his wife. He is survived by his 5 daughters.

== See also ==
- List of mining disasters
