= Millfield, Ohio =

- Census-designated place
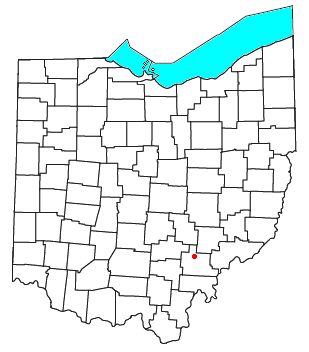
- Location of Millfield, Ohio
- Coordinates: 39°26′03″N 82°05′42″W
- Country: United States
- State: Ohio
- County: Athens
- Township: Dover
- Elevation: 633 ft (193 m)

Population (2020)
  - Total: 311
- Time zone: UTC-5 (Eastern (EST))
  - Summer (DST): UTC-4 (EDT)
- ZIP code: 45761
- Area code: 740
- GNIS feature ID: 2628933

Millfield is a census-designated place in northern Dover Township, Athens County, Ohio, United States. It had a population of 311 at the 2020 census. It has a post office with the ZIP code 45761. It is located near State Route 13 midway between Chauncey and Jacksonville. Route 13 formerly ran through the community, but a bypass relocated it close by.

== History ==
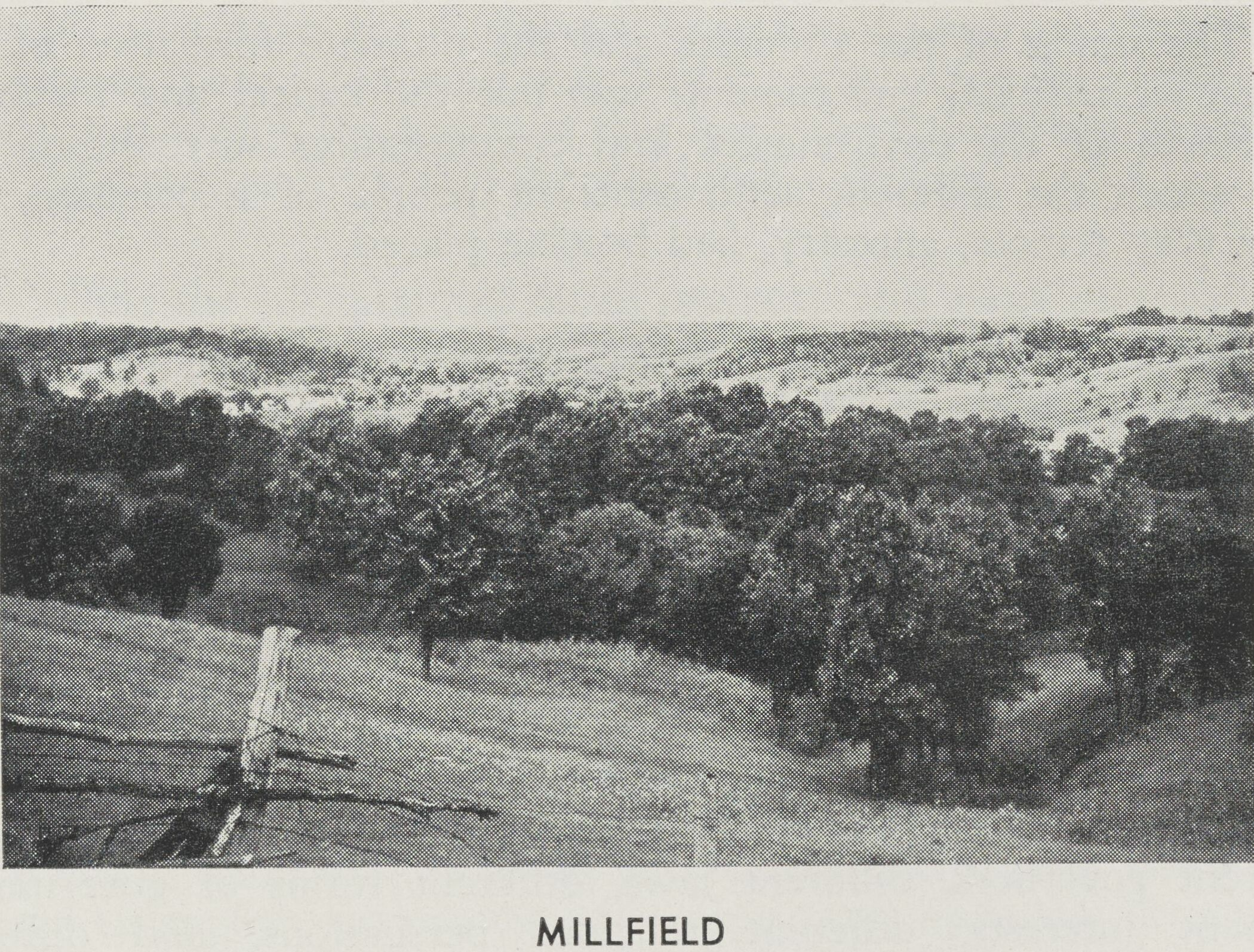
Millfield, Ohio early 1900s

A post office was established at Millfield in 1827. Besides the post office, Millfield had a gristmill.

The Millfield Mine disaster, the worst mine disaster in Ohio history, occurred at Millfield in 1930.
