= Trimble Township, Athens County, Ohio =

Township in Ohio, US

- Township
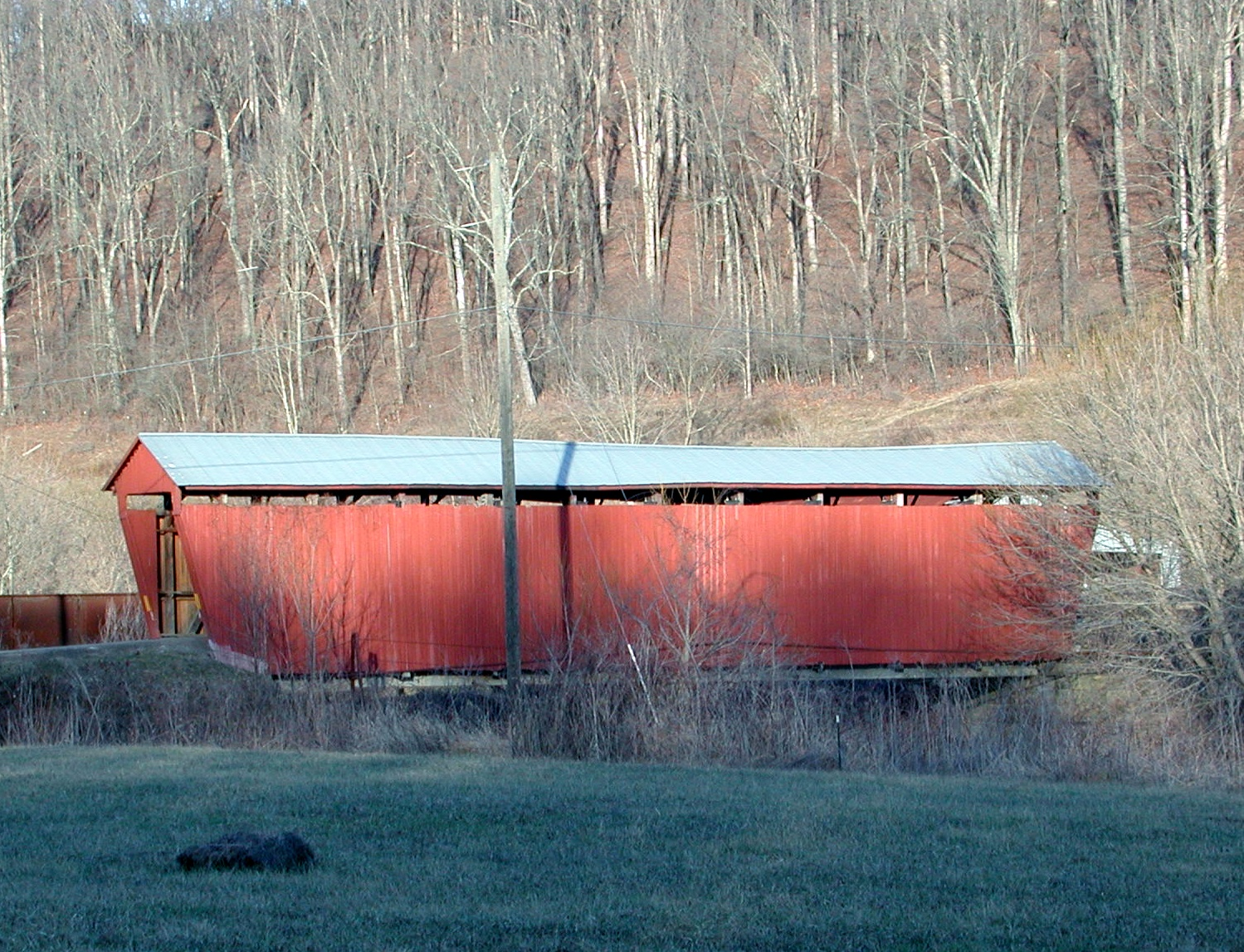
- Palos Covered Bridge

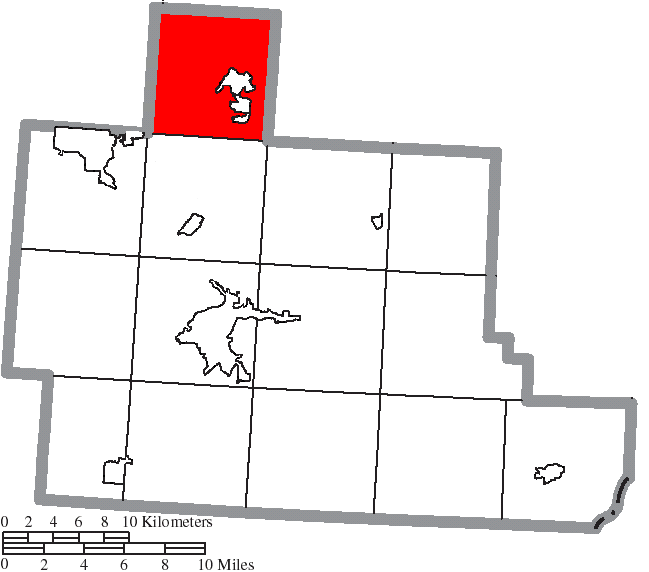
- Location of Trimble Township in Athens County
- Coordinates: 39°29′50″N 82°5′15″W
- Country: United States
- State: Ohio
- County: Athens

Area
  - Total: 37.5 sq mi (97.0 km^{2})
  - Land: 37.1 sq mi (96.0 km^{2})
  - Water: 0.39 sq mi (1.0 km^{2})
- Elevation: 679 ft (207 m)

Population (2020)
  - Total: 4,041
  - Density: 109/sq mi (42.1/km^{2})
- Time zone: UTC-5 (Eastern (EST))
  - Summer (DST): UTC-4 (EDT)
- ZIP code: 45782
- Area code: 740
- FIPS code: 39-77420
- GNIS feature ID: 1085758

Trimble Township is one of the fourteen townships of Athens County, Ohio, United States. The 2020 census found 4,041 people in the township.

== Geography ==
Located in the far northern part of the county, it borders the following townships:

- Monroe Township, Perry County - north
- Homer Township, Morgan County - east
- Ames Township - southeast corner
- Dover Township - south
- York Township - southwest corner
- Ward Township, Hocking County - west
- Coal Township, Perry County - northwest corner

The farthest north township in Athens County, it is the only county township to border Perry County.

Three villages are located in eastern Trimble Township: Glouster in the north, Trimble in the centre, and Jacksonville in the south.

== Name and history ==
Trimble Township was organized in 1827. Named for Allen Trimble, Governor of Ohio, it is the only Trimble Township statewide.

== Government ==
The township is governed by a three-member board of trustees, who are elected in November of odd-numbered years to a four-year term beginning on the following January 1. Two are elected in the year after the presidential election and one is elected in the year before it. There is also an elected township fiscal officer, who serves a four-year term beginning on April 1 of the year after the election, which is held in November of the year before the presidential election. Vacancies in the fiscal officership or on the board of trustees are filled by the remaining trustees.
