= Alexander Local School District =

School district in Ohio, United States

Address
- 6091 Ayers Road Albany, Ohio, 45710; United States

District information
- Type: Public
- Grades: PK–12
- Schools: 2
- NCES District ID: 3904590

Students and staff
- Students: 1,362 (2025–2026)
- Teachers: 97.50 (on an FTE basis) (2025–2026)
- Staff: 181.20 (on an FTE basis) (2025–2026)
- Student–teacher ratio: 13.97 (2025–2026)

Other information
- Website: www.alexanderschools.org

The Alexander Local School District is a public school district based in Albany, Ohio, United States.

The school district includes all of Alexander and Lodi townships, most of Waterloo Township as well as a small portion of west-central Athens Township in Athens County. Columbia Township in northwestern Meigs County and an extremely small portion of far eastern Knox Township in Vinton County also lie within the district.

Albany is the only incorporated village that is served by Alexander Local Schools. Notable unincorporated communities in the district include Carbondale, New Marshfield, and Shade.

== Schools ==
The district consists of one Pre-Kindergarten–12 complex, opposite Lake Snowden on US 50/SR 32. The complex is split into three campuses - an Elementary School (Grades PK-5), a Middle School (Grades 6-8), and a High School (Grades 9-12).

== See also ==
- List of school districts in Ohio
