= Shade, Ohio =

Unincorporated community in Ohio, U.S.

Coordinates: 39°13′33″N 82°02′19″W

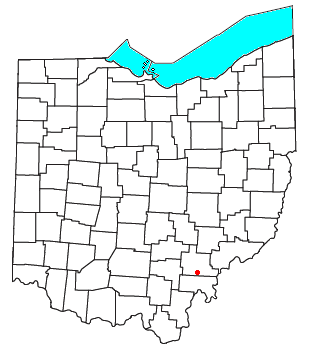
Location of Shade, Ohio

Shade is an unincorporated community in southern Lodi Township, Athens County, Ohio, United States. It has a post office with the ZIP code 45776. It lies along U.S. Route 33.

== History ==
A post office called Shade was established in 1837 and remained operational until 1996. In 1880, Shade had 175 inhabitants. Its name is derived from the Middle Branch of the Shade River which lies about two miles from the village.

== Public services ==
The old Shade school has been converted to a community centre, The Shade Community Center Association (SCCA), a registered non-profit entity set up to serve the community in many ways. The SCCA offers a lending library, open to the public; potluck lunches on Thursdays; musical jam sessions; a Senior Citizens Center and many other fun and educational services.

The community itself exists mostly as it was in the late 1950s, with the relocation of the old store to a new building and new construction of homes in a rural setting only minutes from Athens.

The residents of Shade are served by the Alexander Local School District and Alexander High School. They are also served by the Athens County Public Library, with branches in Albany, Athens, Chauncey, Coolville, Glouster, Nelsonville, and The Plains.
