= Tri-Valley Conference (Ohio) =

High school athletic conference

The Tri-Valley Conference (TVC) is a 13-member high school athletic conference located in southeastern Ohio. The 13 Ohio high school conference members are affiliated with the Ohio High School Athletic Association (OHSAA). The conference is divided into two divisions based on school size.

== Members ==
School	Nickname	Location	Colors	Tenure
Ohio Division
Alexander	Spartans	Albany	Red, black	1974–
Athens	Bulldogs	The Plains	Green, gold	2008–
Meigs	Marauders	Pomeroy	Maroon, gold	1983–
Nelsonville-York	Buckeyes	Nelsonville	Brown, white, orange	1970–
River Valley	Raiders	Bidwell	Black, silver	2014–
Vinton County	Vikings	McArthur	Maroon, white	1969– (Charter)
Wellston	Golden Rockets	Wellston	Blue, gold	1982–
Hocking Division
Belpre	Golden Eagles	Belpre	Orange, black	1969– (Charter)
Eastern	Eagles	Reedsville	Green, gold, white	1993–
Federal Hocking	Lancers	Stewart	Maroon, gold	1969– (Charter)
Southern	Tornadoes	Racine	Purple, gold	1993–
Trimble	Tomcats	Glouster	Red, gray	1978–
Waterford	Wildcats	Waterford	Kelly green, white	1997–

=== Future members ===
School	Nickname	Location	Colors	Year joined	Notes
Fort Frye	Cadets	Beverly	Red, white, blue	1969 (Baseball only), 2027	Rejoining from TSL in 2027
Marietta	Tigers	Marietta	Orange, black	2027	Joining from TSL in 2027
Warren	Warriors	Vincent	Blue, white	1969–1986 (Charter), 2027	Left for the SEOAL in 1986, rejoining from TSL in 2027

== Former members ==
School	Nickname	Location	Colors	Tenure in TVC	Notes
Miller	Falcons	Corning	Purple, white	1983–2020	Left for MSL Cardinal
South Gallia	Rebels	Mercerville	Red, gold	2010–2023	Left for Southern Ohio Conference
Wahama	White Falcons	Mason, West Virginia	Red, white	2010–2020	Left for LKC

== History ==
The TVC was established in 1969, but football did not start as a league sport until the following year, 1970. The league has grown considerably with aggressive expansion throughout most of its history.

The following is a timeline of when schools were added to the league. All years listed refer to the fall of that year. Example: 1969 means the fall of 1969, or the 1969–1970 school year.

1969 - The four charter members:

- Belpre Golden Eagles
- Federal Hocking Lancers
- Vinton County Vikings
- Warren Warriors

1970: Nelsonville-York leaves the SEOAL to join the TVC as the fifth league member. This is also the first year football is a league sport. The TVC looked like this for the four-year period from 1970 to 1973:

- Belpre Golden Eagles
- Federal Hocking Lancers
- Nelsonville-York Buckeyes
- Vinton County Vikings
- Warren Warriors

1974: Alexander joins the TVC as the sixth league member. The TVC looked like this for the four-year period from 1974 to 1977:

- Alexander Spartans
- Belpre Golden Eagles
- Federal Hocking Lancers
- Nelsonville-York Buckeyes
- Vinton County Vikings
- Warren Warriors

1978: Trimble joins the TVC as the seventh league member. The TVC looked like this for the four-year period from 1978 to 1981:

- Alexander Spartans
- Belpre Golden Eagles
- Federal Hocking Lancers
- Nelsonville-York Buckeyes
- Trimble Tomcats
- Vinton County Vikings
- Warren Warriors

1982: Wellston leaves the SEOAL and joins the TVC as the eighth league member. The TVC looked like this in 1982:

- Alexander Spartans
- Belpre Golden Eagles
- Federal Hocking Lancers
- Nelsonville-York Buckeyes
- Trimble Tomcats
- Vinton County Vikings
- Warren Warriors
- Wellston Golden Rockets

1983: Meigs leaves the SEOAL and joins the TVC and Miller also joins the TVC as the ninth and tenth members. The TVC looked like this for the three-year period from 1983 to 1985:

- Alexander Spartans
- Belpre Golden Eagles
- Federal Hocking Lancers
- Meigs Marauders
- Miller Falcons
- Nelsonville-York Buckeyes
- Trimble Tomcats
- Vinton County Vikings
- Warren Warriors
- Wellston Golden Rockets

1986: Warren leaves the TVC to join the SEOAL, bringing league membership down to nine schools. The TVC looked like this for the 7-year period from 1986 to 1992:

- Alexander Spartans
- Belpre Golden Eagles
- Federal Hocking Lancers
- Meigs Marauders
- Miller Falcons
- Nelsonville-York Buckeyes
- Trimble Tomcats
- Vinton County Vikings
- Wellston Golden Rockets

1993: The TVC is divided into two divisions, TVC OHIO and TVC HOCKING. Ohio and Hocking being the names of the rivers that run through the conference - the Ohio River and the Hocking River. The larger schools are placed in the TVC OHIO and the smaller schools are placed in the TVC HOCKING. Eastern and Southern are added as the tenth and eleventh league members. The TVC looked like this for the 4-year period from 1993 to 1996:

TVC OHIO

- Belpre Golden Eagles
- Meigs Marauders
- Nelsonville-York Buckeyes
- Vinton County Vikings
- Wellston Golden Rockets

TVC HOCKING

- Alexander Spartans
- Eastern Eagles
- Federal Hocking Lancers
- Miller Falcons
- Southern Tornadoes
- Trimble Tomcats

1997: Waterford is added as the twelfth league member. Waterford joins the TVC Hocking, bumping Alexander up to the TVC Ohio. The TVC experienced its longest streak of no league changes (11 years) and looked like this for the 11-year period from 1997 to 2007:

TVC OHIO

- Alexander Spartans
- Belpre Golden Eagles
- Meigs Marauders
- Nelsonville-York Buckeyes
- Vinton County Vikings
- Wellston Golden Rockets

TVC HOCKING

- Eastern Eagles
- Federal Hocking Lancers
- Miller Falcons
- Southern Tornadoes
- Trimble Tomcats
- Waterford Wildcats

2008: Athens leaves the SEOAL and joins the TVC Ohio as the thirteenth league member. The TVC looks like this for the two-year period from 2008 to 2009:

TVC OHIO

- Alexander Spartans
- Athens Bulldogs
- Belpre Golden Eagles
- Meigs Marauders
- Nelsonville-York Buckeyes
- Vinton County Vikings
- Wellston Golden Rockets

TVC HOCKING

- Eastern Eagles
- Federal Hocking Lancers
- Miller Falcons
- Southern Tornadoes
- Trimble Tomcats
- Waterford Wildcats

2010: South Gallia and Wahama join the TVC Hocking as the fourteenth and fifteenth league members. Wahama becomes the first school located in the State of West Virginia to join the previously all-Ohio conference. Belpre, due to declining enrollment, moves down to the TVC Hocking. The TVC looked like this for 4 years from 2010 to 2014:

TVC OHIO

- Alexander Spartans
- Athens Bulldogs
- Meigs Marauders
- Nelsonville-York Buckeyes
- Vinton County Vikings
- Wellston Golden Rockets

TVC HOCKING

- Belpre Golden Eagles
- Eastern Eagles
- Federal Hocking Lancers
- Miller Falcons
- South Gallia Rebels
- Southern Tornadoes
- Trimble Tomcats
- Wahama White Falcons
- Waterford Wildcats

2014: River Valley leaves the OVC and joins the TVC as the 16th league member and becomes a part of the TVC OHIO. The TVC looked like this for 6 years from 2014 to 2019:

TVC OHIO

- Alexander Spartans
- Athens Bulldogs
- Meigs Marauders
- Nelsonville-York Buckeyes
- River Valley Raiders
- Vinton County Vikings
- Wellston Golden Rockets

TVC HOCKING

- Belpre Golden Eagles
- Eastern Eagles
- Federal Hocking Lancers
- Miller Falcons
- South Gallia Rebels
- Southern Tornadoes
- Trimble Tomcats
- Wahama White Falcons
- Waterford Wildcats

2020: Miller leaves the TVC to join the MSL Cardinal, and Wahama leaves to join the LKC as the league goes back down to 14 members. The TVC looked like this for 3 years from 2020 to 2023:

TVC OHIO

- Alexander Spartans
- Athens Bulldogs
- Meigs Marauders
- Nelsonville-York Buckeyes
- River Valley Raiders
- Vinton County Vikings
- Wellston Golden Rockets

TVC HOCKING

- Belpre Golden Eagles
- Eastern Eagles
- Federal Hocking Lancers
- South Gallia Rebels
- Southern Tornadoes
- Trimble Tomcats
- Waterford Wildcats

2023: South Gallia leaves the TVC to join the SOC, bringing the league back down to 13 members. The TVC looked like this for 3 years from 2023 to 2026:

TVC OHIO

- Alexander Spartans
- Athens Bulldogs
- Meigs Marauders
- Nelsonville-York Buckeyes
- River Valley Raiders
- Vinton County Vikings
- Wellston Golden Rockets

TVC HOCKING

- Belpre Golden Eagles
- Eastern Eagles
- Federal Hocking Lancers
- Southern Tornadoes
- Trimble Tomcats
- Waterford Wildcats

2026: Marietta, Fort Frye and Warren leave the TSL and join the TVC, bringing the league up to 16 members. A 3rd division is added called the Muskingum Division. Athens is moved up to the Muskingum Division. The TVC-Muskingum will begin play in the 2027-2028 school year. As of 2026, the TVC looks like this:

TVC Muskingum

- Athens Bulldogs
- Fort Frye Cadets
- Marietta Tigers
- Warren Warriors

TVC Ohio

- Alexander Spartans
- Meigs Marauders
- Nelsonville-York Buckeyes
- River Valley Raiders
- Vinton County Vikings
- Wellston Golden Rockets

TVC Hocking

- Belpre Golden Eagles
- Eastern Eagles
- Federal Hocking Lancers
- Southern Tornadoes
- Trimble Tomcats
- Waterford Wildcats
