= Federal Hocking High School =

Location
- 8461 SR 144; Stewart, (Athens County), Ohio 45778; United States; 39°18′44″N 81°52′47″W

Information
- Type: Public, Coeducational high school
- School district: Federal Hocking Local School District
- Superintendent: George Wood
- Principal: Jessica Pennington
- Staff: 14.00 (on an FTE basis)
- Grades: 6-12
- Enrollment: 212 (2024–2025)
- Student to teacher ratio: 15.07
- Colors: Maroon and Gold
- Athletics: cheerleading, volleyball, football, golf, cross country, boys and girls basketball, track and field, softball, baseball.
- Athletics conference: Tri-Valley Conference-Hocking Division
- Team name: Lancers
- Accreditation: North Central Association of Colleges and Schools
- Website: http://www.fedhock.com/

Federal Hocking High School (FHHS) is a public high school in Stewart, Ohio. It is the only high school in the Federal Hocking Local School District. The school mascot is the Lancers. The communities of Amesville and Coolville are served by the district. These two communities have elementary schools.

== Athletics ==
The Lancers belong to the Ohio High School Athletic Association (OHSAA) and the Tri-Valley Conference, a 16-member athletic conference located in southeastern Ohio. The conference is divided into two divisions based on school size. The Ohio Division features the larger schools and the Hocking Division features the smaller schools, including Federal Hocking.

== See also ==
- Ohio High School Athletic Conferences
