= Ohio State Route 329 =

State highway in southeastern Ohio, US

State Route 329

Route information
- Maintained by ODOT
- Length: 23.80 mi (38.30 km)
- Existed: 1932–present

Major junctions
- South end: US 50 / SR 32 in Guysville
- North end: SR 13 in Trimble

Location
- Country: United States
- State: Ohio
- Counties: Athens, Morgan

Highway system
- Ohio State Highway System; Interstate; US; State; Scenic
← SR 328	→ SR 330
← I-280	→ SR 281

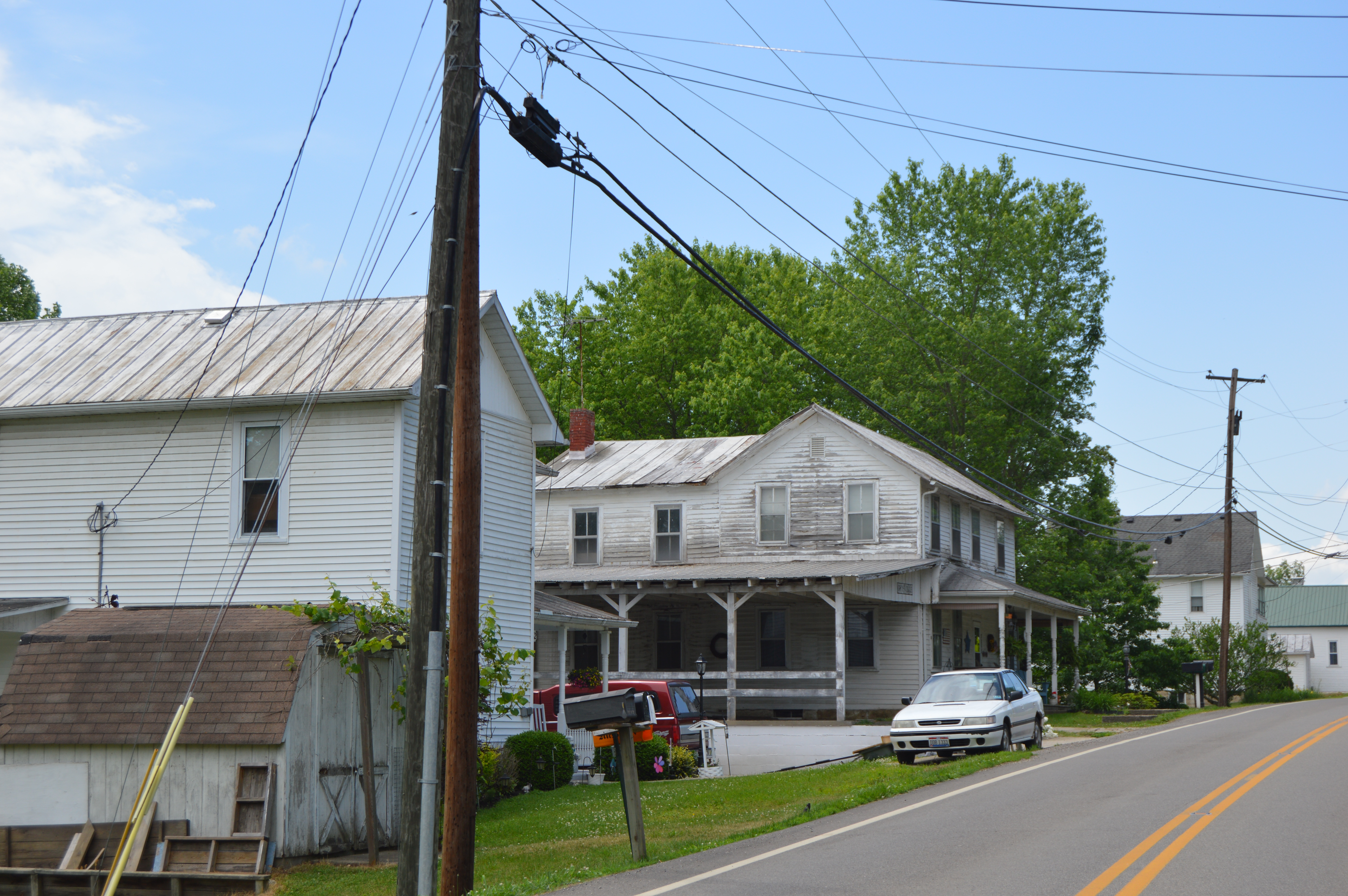
Along SR 329 in Guysville

State Route 329 (SR 329) is a state highway located in southeastern Ohio. The route is signed as a north–south route though the shape of the road is more of a backwards C. The southern terminus of SR 329 is in the Rome Township community of Guysville at US 50 and SR 32. After traveling north through the Athens County communities of Stewart and Amesville, the route briefly enters Morgan County before re-entering Athens County and ending at SR 13 in the village of Trimble.

== History ==
SR 329 was certified and paved in 1932, originally routed from Guysville to Stewart, in southeast Ohio. In 1937, the route was extended from Stewart to US 50 Alternate, 2 miles (3.2 km) east of Amesville. In 1962, the highway was extended to Trimble, passing through Amesville and using the former route of SR 280.

== Major intersections ==
County	Location	mi	km	Destinations	Notes
Athens	Rome Township	0.00	0.00	US 50 (James A. Rhodes Appalachian Highway) / SR 32 – Athens, Coolville	
Athens	Rome Township	2.38	3.83	SR 144 south (Church Street) – Coolville	Northern terminus of SR 144
Athens	Bern Township	12.19	19.62	SR 550 east – Belpre	Southern end of SR 550 concurrency
Athens	Amesville	13.66	21.98	SR 550 west (State Street) – Athens	Northern end of SR 550 concurrency
Morgan	No major junctions				
Athens	Trimble	23.80	38.30	SR 13 (Lake Drive) – Glouster, Chauncey	
1.000 mi = 1.609 km; 1.000 km = 0.621 mi: Concurrency terminus
