= Ohio State Route 144 =

State highway in Athens County, Ohio, US

State Route 144

Route information
- Maintained by ODOT
- Length: 15.31 mi (24.64 km)
- Existed: 1923–present

Major junctions
- South end: SR 124 in Hockingport
- US 50 / SR 7 / SR 32 near Coolville
- North end: SR 329 in Stewart

Location
- Country: United States
- State: Ohio
- Counties: Athens

Highway system
- Ohio State Highway System; Interstate; US; State; Scenic
← SR 143	→ SR 145

State Route 144 (SR 144) is a north–south state highway in the southern portion of Ohio, a U.S. state. The southern terminus of State Route 144 is at a T-interchange with State Route 124 in Hockingport. Its northern terminus is at another T-intersection, this time with State Route 329 in the unincorporated community of Stewart.

== Route description ==
State Route 144 exists entirely within the southeastern portion of Athens County. There are no portions of this highway that are included within the National Highway System, a network of highways identified as most imperative for the economy, mobility and defense of the country.

== History ==
1923 marked the year in which State Route 144 was established. Its original routing was composed of the current stretch of U.S. Route 50 from Athens to its current junction with State Route 144 near Coolville, the current stretch of State Route 144 from that point to its current southern terminus at State Route 124 in Hockingport, and State Route 124 from there to its eastern terminus southwest of Belpre. In 1926, with the coming of the U.S. Highway System, the U.S. Route 50 designation replaced what was the section of State Route 144 between Athens and the current junction of the two routes near Coolville.

Another shortening of State Route 144 took place in 1934, when State Route 124 was extended north to Hockingport. From there, State Route 124 replaced the State Route 144 designation heading northeast to that route's eastern terminus southwest of Belpre. However, in 1937, State Route 144 would see an extension. Coinciding with a northward extension of State Route 329, State Route 144 was extended to the northwest from near Coolville to its current northern terminus at State Route 329 in Stewart.

SR 144 was rerouted around Coolville in 2006 as a result of landslides that occurred on the banks of the Hocking and Ohio Rivers in 2005 and 2006. SR 144 exited Coolville on a bridge just south of the US 50 / SR 7 / SR 32 bridges until that bridge was damaged as a result of the landslides. Because of the damaged bridge and nearby damaged roadway along the east side of the Hocking River, SR 144 was rerouted south of Coolville on County Road 59 to a new bridge over the river. The Ohio Department of Transportation (ODOT) formerly maintained this old alignment as SR 144-J, but no longer maintains it as of 2013.

== Major intersections ==
The entire route is in Athens County.

Location	mi	km	Destinations	Notes
Troy Township	0.00	0.00	SR 124 – Reedsville, Little Hocking	
Troy Township	4.57	7.35	US 50 / SR 7 / SR 32 (James A. Rhodes Appalachian Highway) – Belpre	
Rome Township	14.61	23.51	SR 329 – Guysville, Amesville	
1.000 mi = 1.609 km; 1.000 km = 0.621 mi
