= Carbondale, Ohio =

Unincorporated community in Ohio, U.S.

Coordinates: 39°22′40″N 82°16′16″W

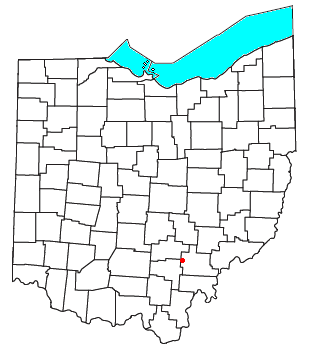
Location of Carbondale, Ohio

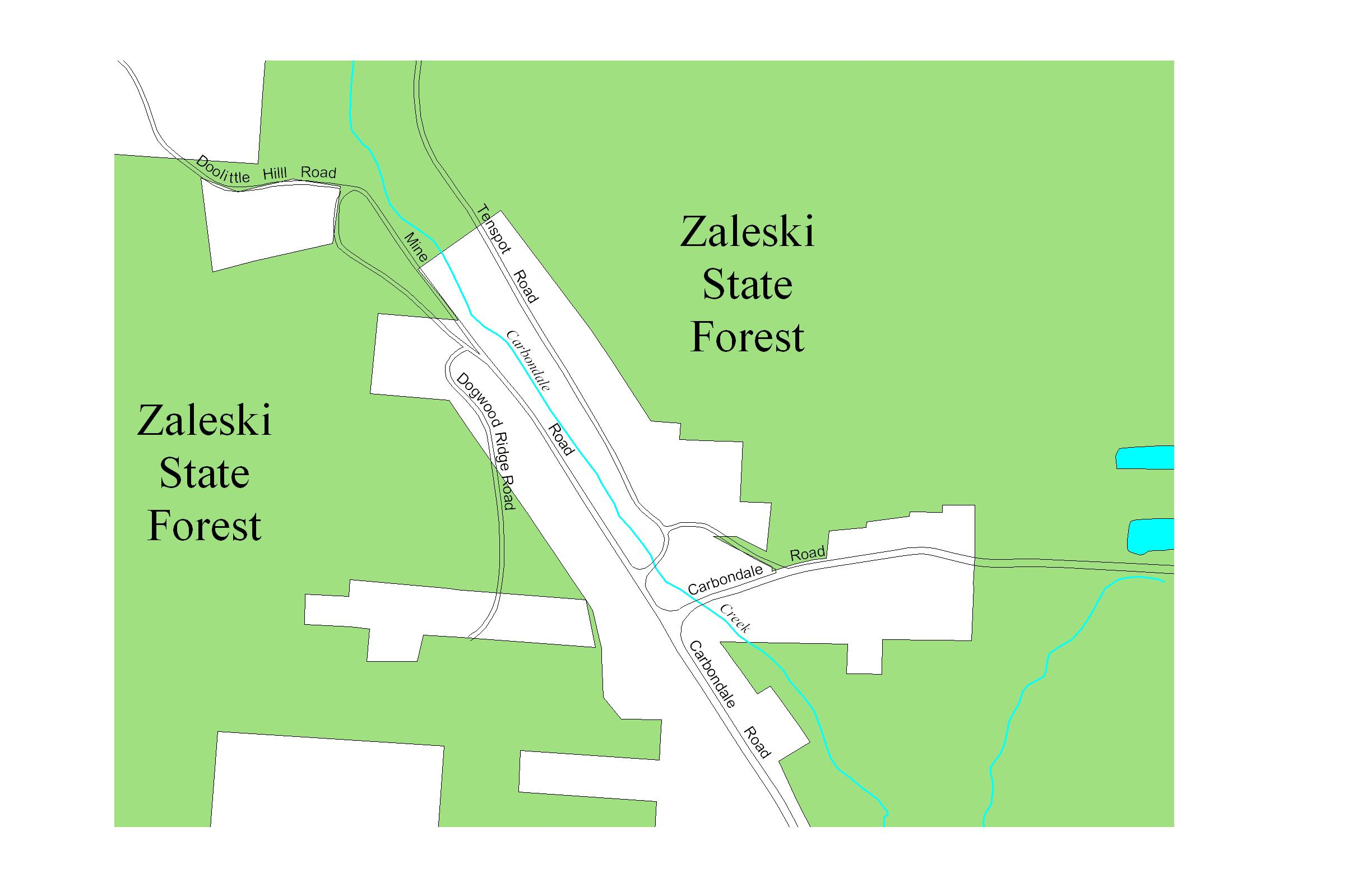
Map of Carbondale area

Carbondale is an unincorporated community in northwestern Waterloo Township, Athens County, Ohio, United States. It has a post office with the ZIP code 45717. It is located a short distance north of State Route 56.

The town is located on Carbondale Creek, which flows into Hewett Fork just below the town. Hewett Fork is a tributary of Raccoon Creek, which is a tributary of the Ohio River.

The name refers to the once-abundant coal resources in the hills and valleys surrounding the community. The first coal mines in Carbondale opened in 1867, soon after the railroad was completed to that point. The area was extensively mined, with all mines closing years ago. The community is closely hemmed in by the Zaleski State Forest, including the Enderlin Forest just west of town, which includes one of the earliest large-scale white pine plantations in the state, and features the state's champion white pine tree.

== Education ==
Public Education in the community of Carbondale is provided by the Alexander Local School District. Campuses serving the community include Alexander Elementary School (Grades PK-5), Alexander Middle School (Grades 6-8), and Alexander High School (Grades 9-12).
