= Waterford High School (Ohio) =

Location
- P.O. Box 67, 330 Main Street, Waterford, Ohio 45786; United States
- Coordinates: 39°32′18″N 81°38′18″W

Information
- Type: (Ohio) public, rural, high school
- Established: 1894
- School district: Wolf Creek Local School District
- Superintendent: Doug Baldwin
- Principal: Suellen Coleman
- Teaching staff: 16.16 (on an FTE basis)
- Grades: 9-12
- Enrollment: 177 (2023–2024)
- Student to teacher ratio: 10.95
- Colors: Green & White
- Athletics: baseball, boys' and girls' basketball, football, boys' and girls' golf, fast pitch softball, girls' volleyball, boys' and girls' track, boys' and girls' cross country, and boys' wrestling
- Athletics conference: Tri-Valley Conference-Hocking Division
- Mascot: Wildcats
- Rival: Beverly Fort Frye Cadets
- Website: District Website

Waterford High School (WHS) is a public high school in Waterford, Washington County, Ohio. It is the only high school in the Wolf Creek Local School District. Their mascot is the Wildcat, and their official school colors are green and white.

== Athletics ==
The Wildcats belong to the Ohio High School Athletic Association (OHSAA) and the Tri-Valley Conference, a 13-member athletic conference located in southeastern Ohio. The conference is divided into two divisions based on school size. The Ohio Division features the larger schools and the Hocking Division features the smaller schools, including Waterford.

Their key rival is the Beverly Fort Frye Cadets. They play each other every year in a showdown known as "The Battle of the Muskingum River."

=== OHSAA State Champions ===
- Girls' Basketball – 2016, 2022, 2025

== Noted Alumni ==
- Wilbur Cooper (1910) – MLB Pitcher for the Pittsburgh Pirates, Chicago Cubs, and Detroit Tigers.

== See also ==
- Ohio High School Athletic Conferences
