= FHHS =

FHHS may refer to the following schools in the United States:

- Fairmont Heights High School (Maryland), Landover, Prince George's County, Maryland (Washington, DC area)
- Federal Hocking High School, Stewart, Ohio
- Forest Hill High School, West Palm Beach (Miami-Fort Lauderdale area)
- Forest Hills High School (Pennsylvania), Sidman, Pennsylvania
- Forest Hills High School (New York), in Queens, New York City
- Francis Howell High School, Weldon Spring, Missouri (St. Louis area)
- Friday Harbor High School, Friday Harbor, Washington
- Fort Hamilton High School, Brooklyn, New York City, New York
- Fort Hunt High School, Alexandria, Virginia (Washington, DC area)
