= Mary Reed (missionary) =

American Christian missionary

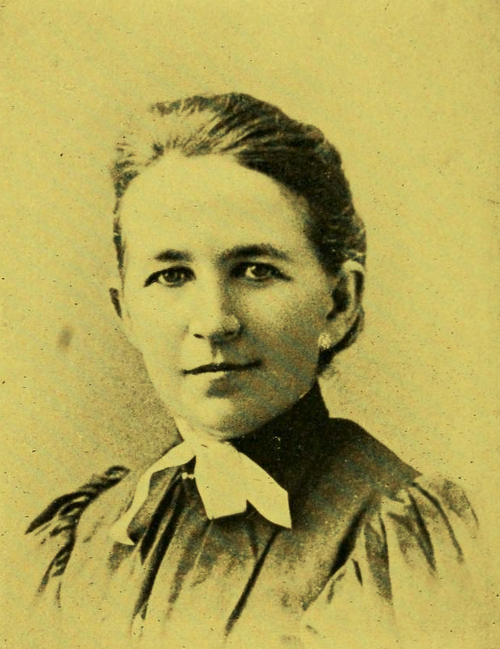
- Reed in 1900

Personal life
- Born: 1854 Lowell, Ohio, U.S.
- Died: 1943 (aged 88–89) Chandag, Pithoragarh, India
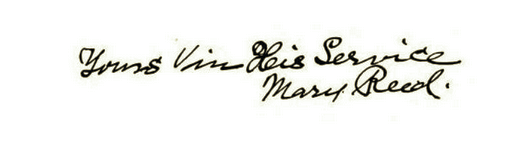
- Signature

Religious life
- Religion: Christianity
- Denomination: Methodist Episcopal Church
- Institute: Woman's Foreign Missionary Society of the Methodist Episcopal Church
- Profession: teacher; missionary

Senior posting
- Post: India
- Awards: Kaisar-i-Hind Medal

Mary Reed (1854–1943) was an American Christian missionary to India. For the first ten years of her career, she worked as a school teacher in her home state of Ohio. In 1884, she went to India as a missionary of the Cincinnati Branch of the Woman's Foreign Missionary Society of the Methodist Episcopal Church, and entered upon zenana missions work at Cawnpore, Uttar Pradesh on the Ganges. In 1890, she became conscious of a physical disability, and thinking that her health was failing, returned to the U.S. on a furlough. While recovering in Cincinnati, she learned that the illness was leprosy. At first, Reed was overwhelmed with the realization, but she quickly decided to give her life to work among the lepers in India, and her thoughts turned to Pithoragarh, among the foothills of the Himalayas, at the base of Chandag Heights, where a group of lepers lived in whom she had already become interested. Her suspicions as to the nature of her disease were confirmed by every specialist she consulted. She kept the diagnosis a secret, however, from her family, with the exception of one sister, and returned to India in 1891. Proceeding to Pithoragarh, Reed informed her family and friends by letter of her purpose, and her reason for choosing this service. Thereafter, she conducted her important work at Chandag, and built up an institution which in many respects was a model of order and well-arranged facilities. Reed continued to work among the lepers of India until her death in 1943. She was a recipient of the Kaisar-i-Hind Medal.

== Early life ==
Mary Reed was born in Lowell, Ohio, in 1854. (Note: According to Logan (1912), Reed was born in Crooked Tree, Ohio.) (Note: Dennis (1897) records her year of birth as 1857, while the International Leprosy Association records her year of birth as 1858.) She was the first daughter in a family of four brothers and four sisters.

At 16, she became a Christian.

== Career ==
=== Public school teacher ===
At the age of 18, she became a public school teacher, and taught for 10 years in Ohio.

She often felt a desire to enter the foreign mission field, but considered herself too unworthy and inefficient. Eventually, she gained confidence, obtained the consent of her parents, resigned her teaching post, and offered herself to the Woman's Foreign Missionary Society. Reed was moved by some compelling claim to give her life to India. She had heard of the narrow lives women were forced to live, confined within zenanas, with little or no occupation to relieve their monotonous days. Their condition of arrested growth, deprived of athletic development, awakened a responsive interest in the mind of Reed, as she taught boys and girls in the public schools in Ohio.

=== Zenanas ===
She reached India in 1884. At the missionary society's North India Conference in January 1885, Reed was allocated to Cawnpore for work in the zenanas of the city.

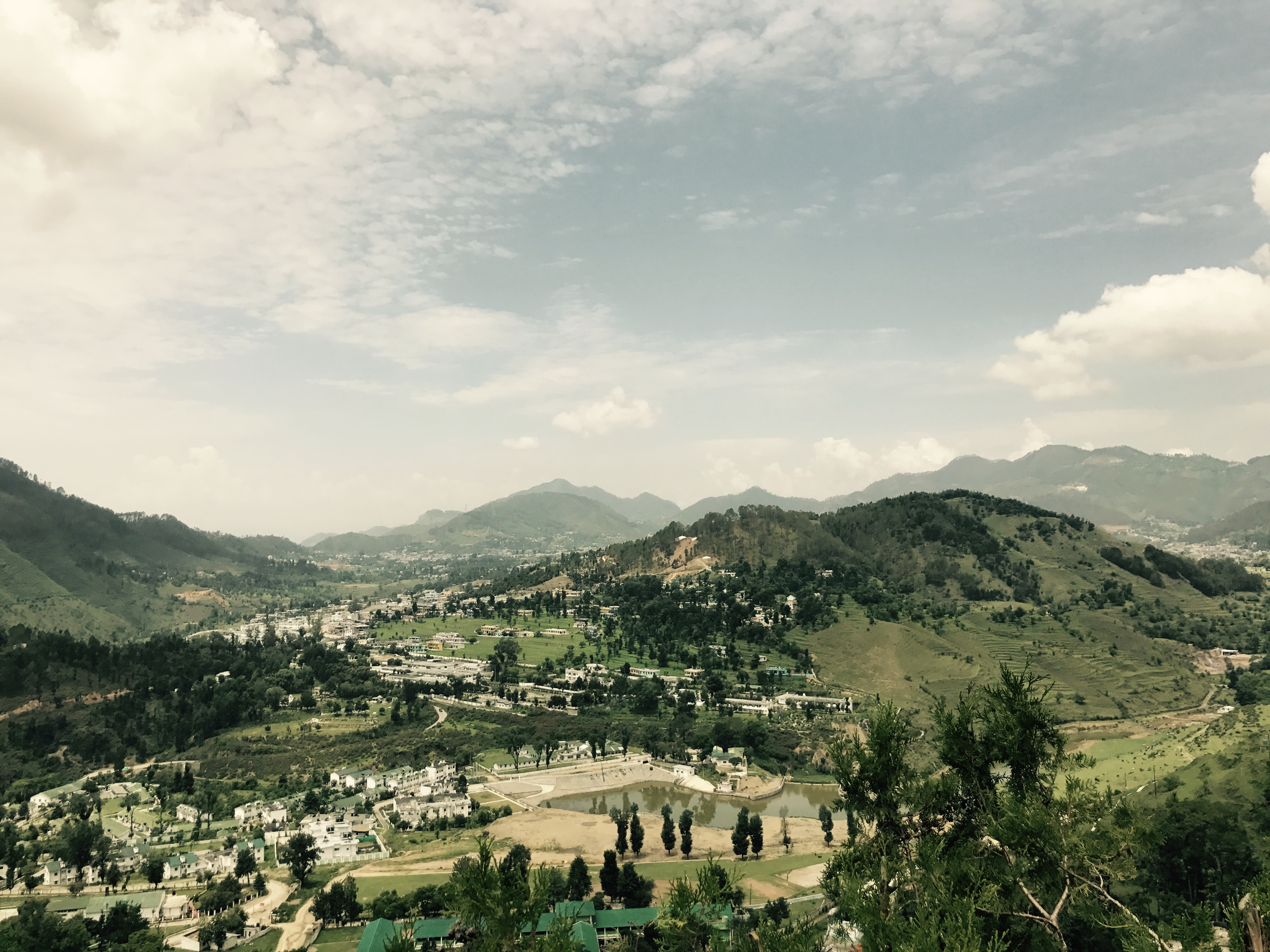
Pithoragarh

At this juncture, her health gave way, and a period of rest and change became necessary. Pithoragarh, in the bracing climate of the Himalayas, was selected for the purpose. Here she spent a few weeks of preparation for the work then awaiting her. In addition to study of the language, and observation of missionary work being carried on in the neighbourhood, she had an opportunity of seeing the spot in which was to be erected an asylum for lepers, and she learned of their sufferings. With restored health, she returned to Cawnpore to enter upon the work to which she had been appointed, remaining for four years.

=== Girls' boarding school ===
From Cawnpore she was transferred to Gonda, Uttar Pradesh, where for 12 months, she taught in its girls' boarding school. By this time, her health was seriously undermined, and in January 1890, she returned to the U.S. in search of renewed strength for further service.

=== Furlough ===
In Cincinnati, she underwent a lengthy course of treatment, including at least one operation, but without the hoped-for restoration. Amongst the symptoms, which for some time completely baffled her physicians, were a constant tingling pain in the forefinger of the right hand, and later, a spot on one cheek, near the ear.

After searching such medical books that she could access, she confided her suspicions to her physician and to one friend (the Cincinnati secretary of her missionary society). Her fears that it was leprosy were confirmed by her doctor, but as his knowledge of the disease was purely theoretical, he transferred his patient to New York City as soon as Reed was fit for the journey. In New York, she was examined by a specialist who had studied the disease in the Sandwich Islands. His verdict confirmed her own suspicion that she had fallen a victim to leprosy.

Desiring to spare her family the pain the knowledge must have brought to them, she kept them, with the single exception of her sister Rena, in ignorance of the diagnosis. Reed insisted on returning to India.

On her return trip, Reed left New York, crossing the Atlantic in the same steamer which carried the Epworth League pilgrims to England in 1891. She arrived in London with her letters of introduction to two eminent specialists, who both confirmed the decision of the American physician. In London, Reed met a young woman school-teacher from New England, whose companionship she greatly enjoyed, and with whom she traveled in Europe, though Paris, as far as Lake Lucerne.

=== Work with lepers ===
In September 1891, a Scottish organization, the Mission to Lepers in India and the East, was approached on behalf of Reed, with a view to finding her a sphere of service among her fellow patients. This organization carried on work among lepers in 34 centers in India, Burma, Ceylon, and China, establishing and maintaining leper asylums. A letter from Bishop James Mills Thoburn, the Superintendent in India of the Methodist Episcopal Church, first informed the committee of this new worker, but whose name was, for the time being, withheld. In writing to propose that Reed be appointed, Superintendent of the Asylum at Pithoragarh, Bishop Thoburn said:

"It is a hard thing to say, and yet it does look as if Providence was sending her to a very needy people who otherwise could receive no help. The district in which Pithoragarh is located, that is, Eastern Kumaun, has more lepers in proportion to its population than any other district in India; at least, so the census indicates. It is a mystery how she ever contracted the disease. She accepts her fate, and feels that she is set apart for the poor creatures who are similarly afflicted in Eastern Kumaun.

Shortly after this, the U.S. newspapers made Reed's name public, together with such particulars as could be collected or invented. A deep impression was created on the mind of the public, eliciting much sympathy.

In the meantime, while waiting the decision of the committee, Reed found a welcome resting place at Pithora with Miss A. M. Budden, who, together with her sister and preceded by their father, had done service among the women, the children, and the lepers of that district.

The committee decision came: they were glad to be able to act on the recommendations of Thoburn and Budden, and to appoint Reed to the superintendence of their Asylum for Lepers at Chandag.

From Bombay, Reed wrote to her sister:— "I shall have the joy of ministering to a class of people, who, but for the preparation which has been mine for this special task, would have no helper at all." Her mother was not told of her condition until Reed reached India.

Reed climbed 6,400 feet (2,000 m) above sea level, up to Chandag Heights in the Himalayas, where her bungalow was being built, to meet, for the first time, the men, women, and children who were to be her future charge. The disabled people assembled while she told them briefly of the circumstances that brought her to them. At the time, the lepers were housed in huts and stables and other quarters inadequate for their comfort. Reed's first move was to secure proper accommodation for the people.

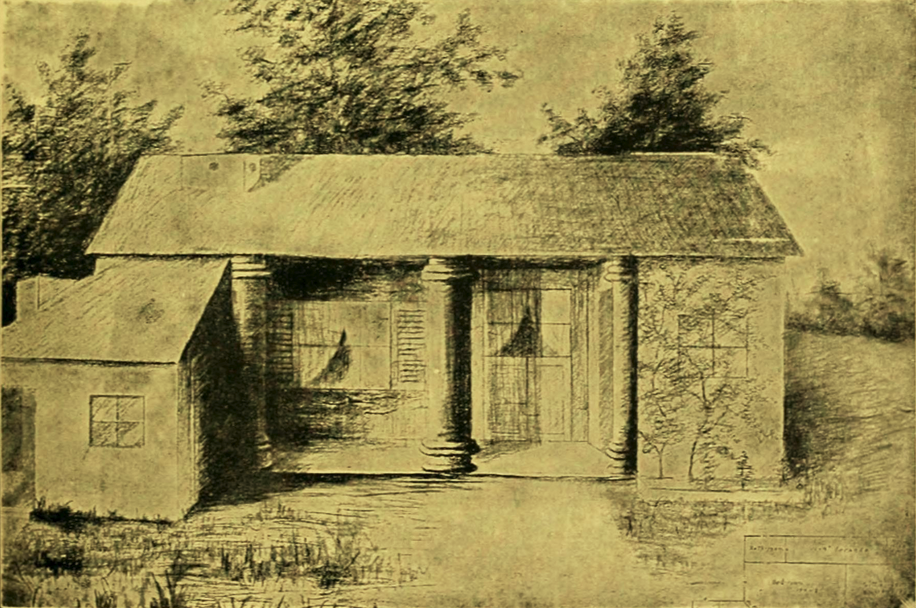
Reed's home, Chandag Heights, India

Reed purchased additional land, and in the course of time, built two good sized structures, accommodating 60 men and boys, three smaller ones for women and children, an isolation hospital for extreme cases with a dispensary attached. There were four other buildings, one of which was the little bungalow fitted up for Reed's occupancy, which she named "Sunny Crest Cottage". A stone-wall, 3 feet (0.91 m) high enclosed the property which 66 acres (27 ha).

She explored the mountains for a water supply, and in an out-of-the-way place discovered a spring of clear water, which skilled engineers connected with the asylum. With flower seed sent from the U.S. she filled the mountainside with blossoms. A vegetable garden and small chicken yard helped the food supply, which was always uncertain in this famine zone of the world. Reed was housekeeper, head nurse, chaplain, secretary and bookkeeper, all in one. With several native assistants, she looked after the diet and simple medical treatment of her patients, taught them to read and held religious services, prayer groups and Bible classes among them. In five years' time, 67 out of 85 converted Christianity.

In addition to the work among the lepers, at one time, Reed was district missionary for the Methodist Episcopal Church, and supervised six village schools and three Sunday Schools, directed a group of Bible women and taught pupils in their homes. Riding or walking, she covered a circumference of 40 miles (64 km).

== Personal life ==
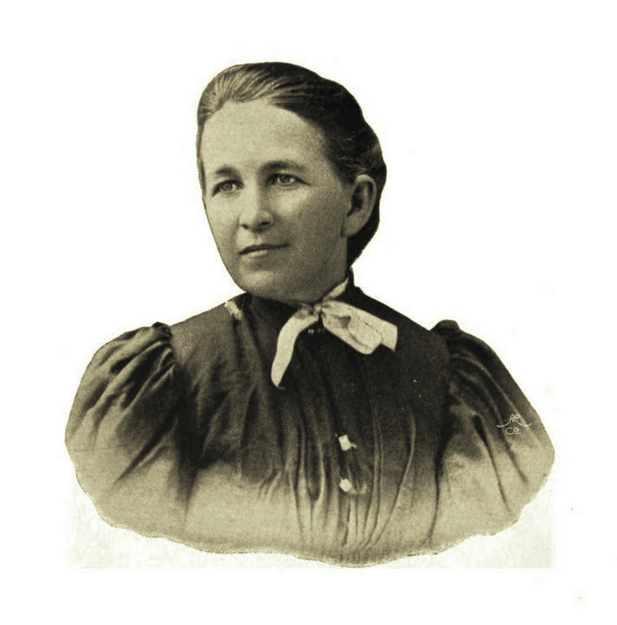
Mary Reed

While working diligently among the lepers, Reed received treatment herself.

Early in 1892, a missionary wrote that Reed suffered constantly and was highly sensitive. For the first six months after Reed's arrival at Pithora, the disease made rapid progress, and she suffered intense pain most of the time. In September, 1893, she wrote:— "My good health is a marvel to all." On July 11, 1896, she wrote:— "As for my health, it is simply marvelous." Then, in August, she wrote again: "I could not tie myself down to my writing-desk this morning till I first sat down at my organ and played and sang." Outward traces of the disease disappeared so completely that physicians pronounced her practically cured, although she herself was at times conscious of its presence in her system. For thirty years, she worked from 12 to 14 hours a day, and in the year 1920, was told by her friends that she never looked so well in her life.

By 1899, Reed's health was noted to be quite improved. By many, it was thought that the physicians were mistaken in pronouncing the disease leprosy, but that it must have been an aggravated form of an eczema, which was prevalent in India. However, the leprosy returned in 1932.

== Death and legacy ==
Mary Reed, missionary to the lepers

In 1900, Reed's biography was published by the missionary, John Jackson (1853–1917), a secretary of the (Edinburgh) "Mission to Lepers".

Mary Reed died in Chandag, India, in 1943, sometime before May 27.

== Awards and honors ==
- 1917, Kaisar-i-Hind gold medal, awarded by the Government of India
