= Federal Creek =

Federal Creek is one of several major tributaries to the Hocking River in southeast Ohio. It drains an area in north-central Athens County, Ohio, as well as an adjacent area in Morgan County, Ohio. This creek is well known for severe flooding. The incorporated village of Amesville, Ohio is located on the creek, while the unincorporated communities of Kilvert, Broadwell, Sharpsburg, and Lathrop are situated on the creek or its tributaries. The confluence of Federal Creek with the Hocking River is located near the unincorporated community of Stewart, Ohio at .

Federal Creek derived its name from early explorers who counted thirteen principal tributaries, thus comparing it to the original United States, with thirteen original states.

== See also ==
- List of rivers of Ohio

39°19′10″N 81°52′45″W
