= Arthur Gish =

American activist (1939–2010)

Arthur G. Gish
- Born: Arthur G. Gish; August 15, 1939; Lancaster County, Pennsylvania, U.S.
- Died: July 28, 2010 (aged 70); Athens County, Ohio, U.S.
- Occupations: Peace activist, preacher, writer, public speaker
- Known for: Anti-war activism, Christian peacemaking
- Spouse: Peggy Gish

Arthur G. Gish (August 15, 1939 – July 28, 2010) was an American peace activist, preacher, writer and public speaker. He was known for his opposition to a number of conflicts, ranging from the Vietnam War to the Iraq War.

== Biography ==
=== Activism ===
Gish was born on August 15, 1939, and raised in Lancaster County, Pennsylvania. He left his family's farm as a teenager and declared himself a conscientious objector. Gish joined the Brethren Volunteer Service, which is part of the Church of the Brethren, and worked in Europe from 1958 until 1960. During the 1960s, Gish protested the Vietnam War and supported the Civil Rights Movement.

After the publication of his book The New Left and Christian Radicalism in 1970, Gish was interviewed by the editor of the Athens Messenger. In this interview he described his relationship to early Protestant cultures of worship and dissent: "Working in the protest movement," Gish said, "I have come to see that the early Brethren and the Anabaptists were not conservatives. They were the radicals of their day.... The early Brethren understood that a Christian is different from the world, that a Christian stands over against the world and is in conflict with the world. To be at peace with God means that one is in conflict with the world."

Much of Gish's activism since 1995 focused in the Middle East, and was channelled through the Church of the Brethren's Christian Peacemaker Team program . A ruddy and distinctive presence, Gish spent much of his time overseas working in Hebron or At-tuwani in the West Bank. A 2003 photograph by the Associated Press depicted Gish standing in front of an Israeli tank in Hebron. Gish and his wife, activist Peggy Gish, opposed the 2003 Iraq War. Art and Peggy Gish were fixtures of peace actions in Athens, Ohio, which saw them cooperating with a wide array of community members, including Ohio University faculty members. Art Gish opposed capital punishment and attended a vigil at the Athens Court House whenever a state execution was taking place.

=== Personal life ===
Gish and his wife settled on an organic farm in Amesville, Ohio, near Athens, where they grew and sold organic produce and other related products.

Arthur Gish was killed on his farm in Athens County, Ohio, on July 28, 2010, when his tractor overturned and caught fire. Gish was 70 years old and was survived by his wife, Peggy Gish, who was in Iraq at the time of the accident.

=== Works authored ===
Gish authored numerous books, including

- The New Left and Christian Radicalism (1970)
- Beyond the Rat Race (1973)
- Living in Christian Community (1979)
- Wealth and Poverty: Four Christian Views of Economics (contributor) (1984)
- Hebron Journal: Stories of Nonviolent Peacemaking (2001)
- At-Tuwani Journal: Hope and Nonviolent Action in a Palestinian Village (2008)
- Muslim, Christian, Jew: The Oneness of God and the Unity of Our Faith (2012, posthumous)

=== Film references ===
Art and Peggy Gish are the subjects of the 2010 short documentary Old Radicals, which screened at the Hot Docs Canadian International Documentary Festival as part of the International Documentary Challenge. In 2012 the film was extended to include the story of Art's death and the stories of 3 other elderly activists. The 45 min documentary is also titled Old Radicals.

== See also ==
- List of peace activists
