= Belpre High School =

Coordinates: 39°16′30″N 81°34′34″W

- 612 33rd Place NE; Belpre, Ohio 45714; United States

Information
- Type: (Ohio) public, urban, high school
- Founded: 1877
- School district: Belpre City School District
- Superintendent: Jeffery Greenley
- Principal: Tyler Schaad
- Staff: 32.00 (FTE)
- Grades: 7-12
- Enrollment: 374 (2023–2024)
- Student to teacher ratio: 11.69
- Colors: Orange & Black
- Athletics: baseball, boys' and girls' basketball, football, boys' and girls' golf, boys' and girls' soccer, fast pitch softball, girls' volleyball, Track and Fields and boys' wrestling
- Athletics conference: Tri-Valley Conference-Hocking Division
- Mascot: Golden Eagle
- Website: www.belpre.k12.oh.us/belprehighschool_home.aspx

Belpre High School is a public high school in Belpre, Ohio, United States. It is the only high school in the Belpre City School District. Their nickname is the Golden Eagles. Grades seven to twelve attend this school.

== Athletics ==
The Golden Eagles belong to the Ohio High School Athletic Association (OHSAA) and the Tri-Valley Conference, a 16-member athletic conference located in southeastern Ohio. The conference is divided into two divisions based on school size. The Ohio Division features the larger schools and the Hocking Division features the smaller schools, including Belpre.

=== Ohio High School Athletic Association State Championships ===
- Boys Track and Field – 1952

== See also ==
- Ohio High School Athletic Conferences
