= Wellston High School (Ohio) =

Public, coeducational high school in Wellston, Ohio, United States

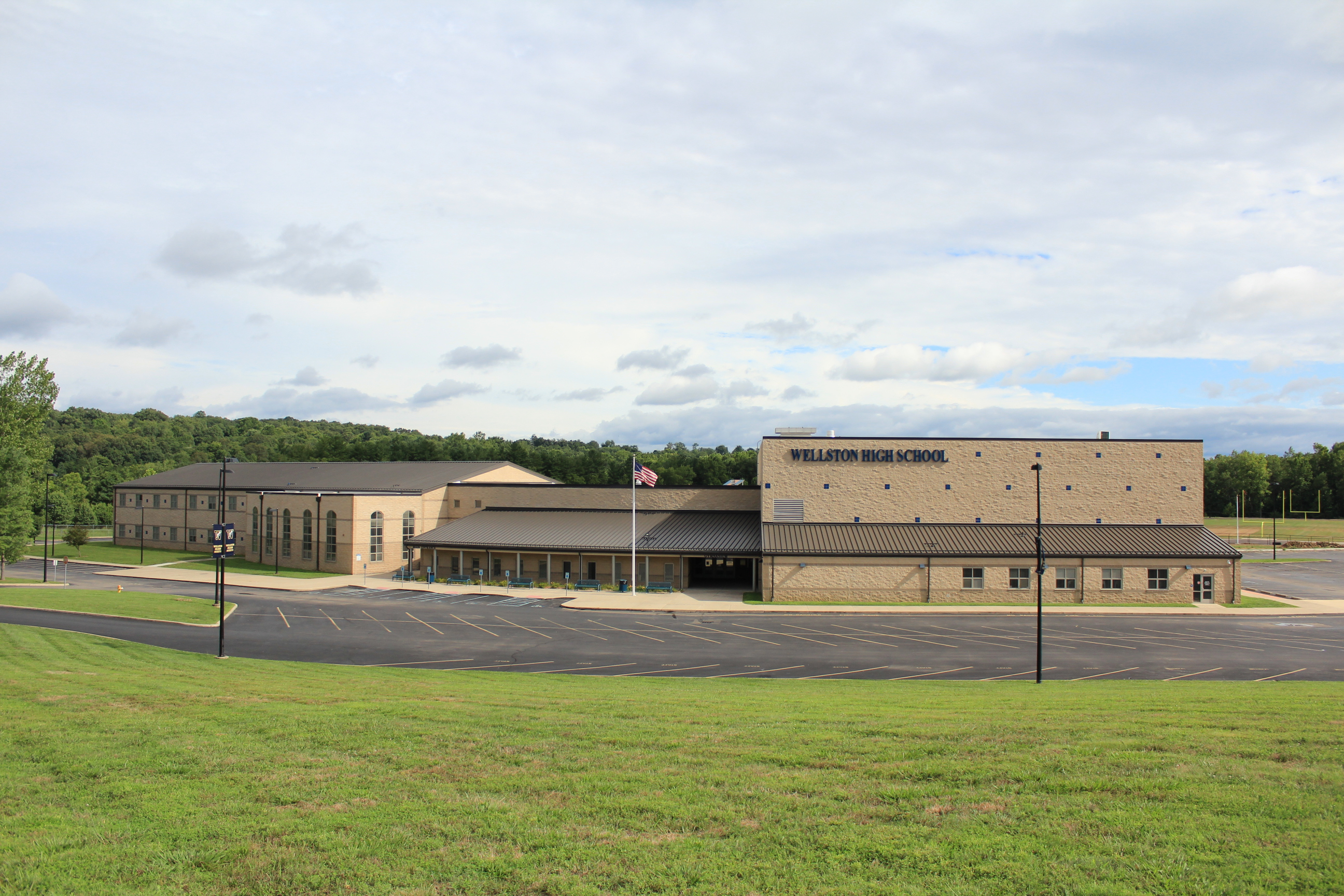

Location
- 200 Golden Rocket Drive; Wellston, (Jackson County), Ohio 45692; United States
- 39°8′3″N 82°32′5″W

Information
- Type: Public, Coeducational high school
- School district: Wellston City Schools
- Superintendent: Scott Dorne
- Principal: Dusty Cremeans
- Teaching staff: 18.63 (FTE)
- Grades: 9-12
- Enrollment: 370 (2022–2023)
- Student to teacher ratio: 19.86
- Colors: Blue and Gold
- Athletics conference: Tri-Valley Conference - Ohio Division
- Team name: Golden Rockets
- Accreditation: North Central Association of Colleges and Schools
- Website: wcs.k12.oh.us

Wellston High School (WHS) is a public high school in Wellston, Ohio. It is the only high school in the Wellston City School District. The school's nickname is the Golden Rockets and the school's official colors are blue and gold.

== Notable alumni ==
- Pete Abele, politician
- John Carey, Director of the Governor's Office of Appalachia, former Chancellor of the Ohio Board of Regents
- Lauren Kelsey Hall, 2004 Miss Ohio USA
- Jeff Montgomery, former MLB baseball player for the Cincinnati Reds and the Kansas City Royals

== Athletics ==
The Golden Rockets belong to the Ohio High School Athletic Association (OHSAA) and the Tri-Valley Conference, a 16-member athletic conference located in southeastern Ohio. The conference is divided into two divisions based on school size. The Ohio Division features the larger schools, including Wellston, and the Hocking Division features the smaller schools.

== See also ==
- Ohio High School Athletic Conferences
