= Lowell, Ohio =

- Village
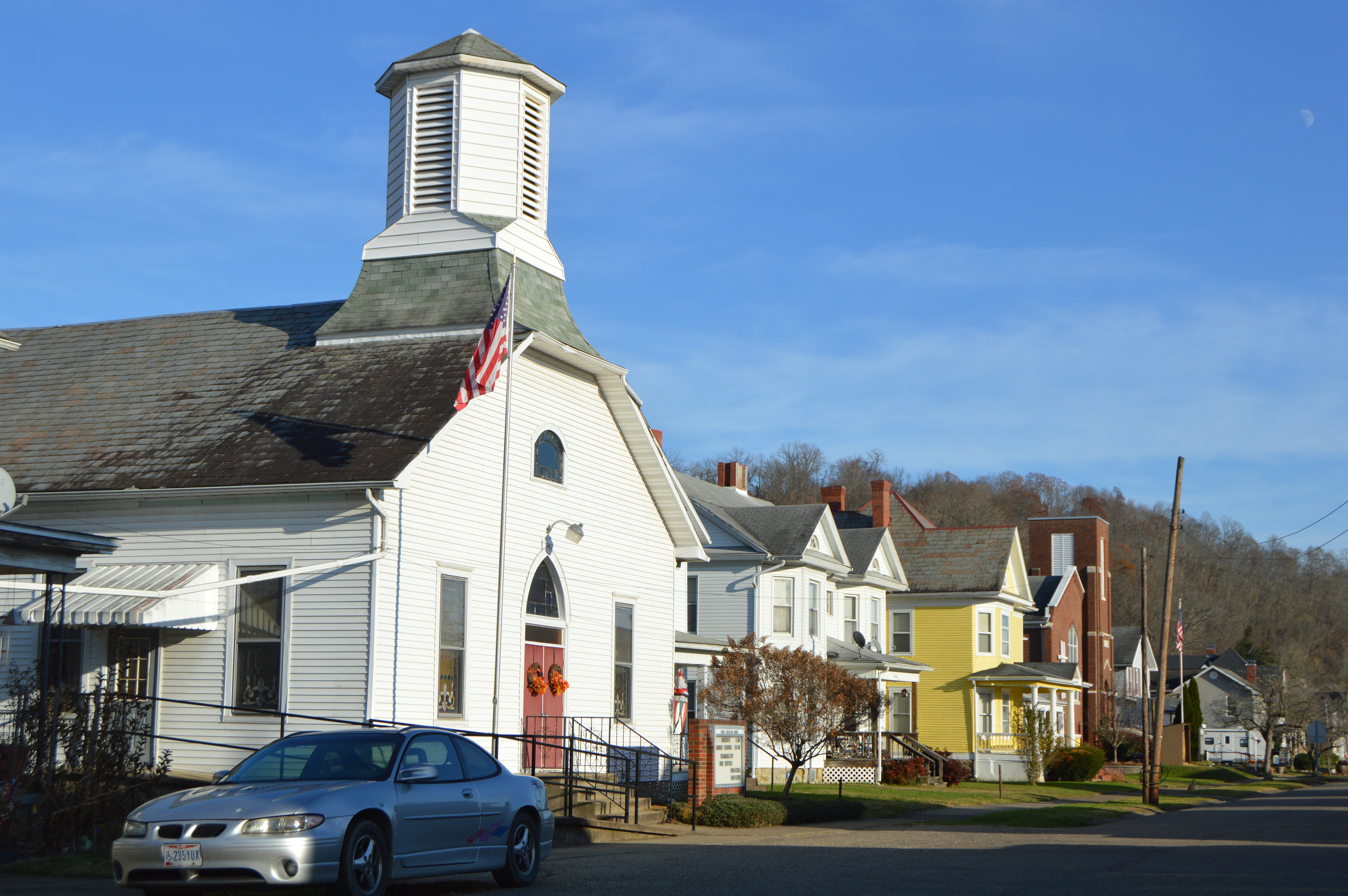
- Fourth Street

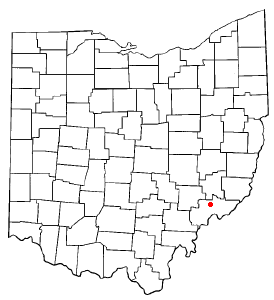
- Location of Lowell, Ohio

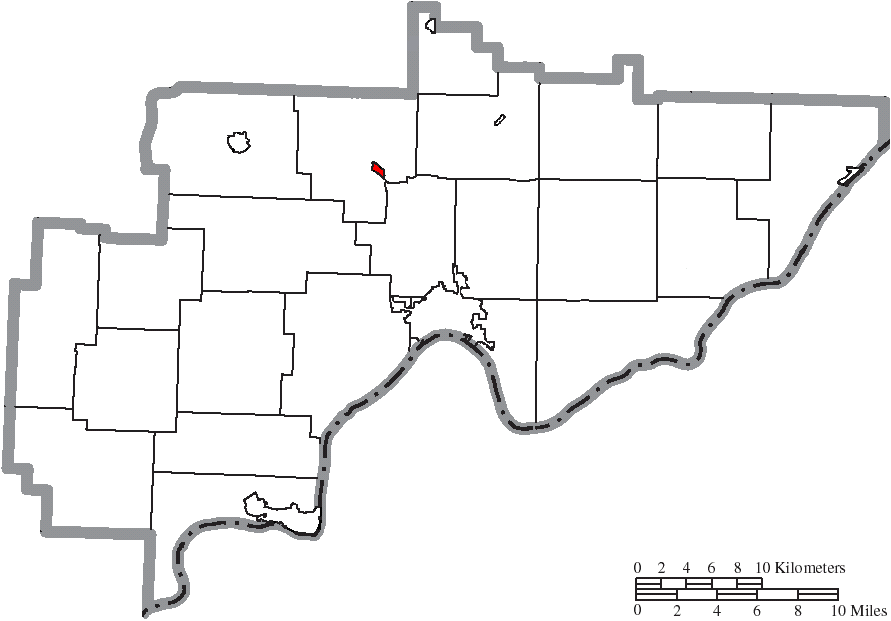
- Location of Lowell in Washington County
- Coordinates: 39°31′45″N 81°30′25″W
- Country: United States
- State: Ohio
- County: Washington

Government
  - Type: Mayor-council
  - Mayor: Steve Weber

Area
  - Total: 0.24 sq mi (0.61 km^{2})
  - Land: 0.23 sq mi (0.59 km^{2})
  - Water: 0.0077 sq mi (0.02 km^{2})
- Elevation: 623 ft (190 m)

Population (2020)
  - Total: 567
  - Density: 2,479.7/sq mi (957.41/km^{2})
- Time zone: UTC-5 (Eastern (EST))
  - Summer (DST): UTC-4 (EDT)
- ZIP code: 45744
- Area code: 740
- FIPS code: 39-45164
- GNIS feature ID: 2399194

Lowell is a village in Washington County, Ohio, United States, along the Muskingum River. The population was 549 at the 2020 census. The village is located about 7.6 miles (12.2 km) north of Marietta, Ohio.

== History ==
The first European settlers to the land that would become Lowell arrived in the late 18th century after the 1787 Northwest Ordinance opened the territory for settlement. Soon after the Ordinance took effect, the Ohio Company of Associates purchased 1,500,000 acres (6,100 km^{2}) of land along the Muskingum River and proceeded to survey the area. The first settlement in what would become the state of Ohio was Marietta, founded in 1788 near the mouth of the Muskingum about 14 miles (23 km) downstream from the site that would become Lowell. By 1789, settlement had spread north to the area where the Cats Creek enters the Muskingum River.

By the 1830s the Muskingum Valley had long been settled, and local leaders created a plan to improve the Muskingum River for use as a source of power. In 1836 the State Legislature approved a bill that appropriated $400,000 to create a series of locks and dams along the river as far north as Dresden. Between 1837 and 1841, eleven dams and twelve locks were built at a cost that had ballooned to over $1.6 million. The third lock was built within a one-mile (1.6 km) long canal constructed near the mouth of the Cats Creek to bypass a series of rapids in the Muskingum. Two competing companies bought land near the canal with the intentions of building a town. The first settlement was laid out on November 8, 1837, and was named Lowell with the idea that it would grow into a large manufacturing city similar to Lowell, Massachusetts. It was located along the upper end of the canal on the west side of the Cats Creek. The second settlement, called Buell's Lowell, was laid out on March 22, 1838. The second settlement quickly grew to dominate to the point that the first settlement became known as Upper Lowell. In 1850, Buell's Lowell was incorporated as a village and in 1889 officially changed its name to Lowell.

During the second half the 19th century several mills, tanneries, and factories were built along the canal. In 1888 the Zanesville and Ohio River Railroad was constructed across the river from Lowell giving the small village rail access to Zanesville in the north and Marietta in the south. By the turn of the 20th century, Lowell's fortunes began to decline as river trade was replaced by the railroads and later automobiles. Industry in the city declined and much of the land along the canal has since been replaced by parkland. Today many Lowell residents rely on Parkersburg and Marietta for jobs and shopping.

On November 10, 2015, no one ran against Steve Weber and he was elected Mayor.

== Geography ==
Lowell is located along the Muskingum River.

According to the United States Census Bureau, the village has a total area of 0.24 square miles (0.62 km^{2}), of which 0.23 square miles (0.60 km^{2}) is land and 0.01 square miles (0.03 km^{2}) is water.

State Routes 60 and 530 connect in Lowell.

== Demographics ==
Historical population
Census	Pop.	Note	%±
1870	350		—
1880	322		−8.0%
1890	441		37.0%
1900	381		−13.6%
1910	569		49.3%
1920	516		−9.3%
1930	545		5.6%
1940	528		−3.1%
1950	638		20.8%
1960	783		22.7%
1970	852		8.8%
1980	729		−14.4%
1990	617		−15.4%
2000	628		1.8%
2010	549		−12.6%
2020	565		2.9%
U.S. Decennial Census

=== 2010 census ===
As of the census of 2010, there were 549 people, 248 households, and 157 families living in the village. The population density was 2,387.0 inhabitants per square mile (921.6/km^{2}). There were 289 housing units at an average density of 1,256.5 per square mile (485.1/km^{2}). The racial makeup of the village was 98.7% White, 0.4% African American, 0.2% from other races, and 0.7% from two or more races. Hispanic or Latino of any race were 0.4% of the population.

There were 248 households, of which 29.8% had children under the age of 18 living with them, 46.0% were married couples living together, 14.1% had a female householder with no husband present, 3.2% had a male householder with no wife present, and 36.7% were non-families. 32.3% of all households were made up of individuals, and 16.2% had someone living alone who was 65 years of age or older. The average household size was 2.21 and the average family size was 2.75.

The median age in the village was 45.2 years. 22.6% of residents were under the age of 18; 5.6% were between the ages of 18 and 24; 21.5% were from 25 to 44; 27.5% were from 45 to 64; and 22.8% were 65 years of age or older. The gender makeup of the village was 45.9% male and 54.1% female.

=== 2000 census ===
As of the census of 2000, there were 628 people, 258 households, and 182 families living in the village. The population density was 2,476.3 inhabitants per square mile (956.1/km^{2}). There were 297 housing units at an average density of 1,171.1 per square mile (452.2/km^{2}). The racial makeup of the village was 99.68% White, and 0.32% from two or more races. Hispanic or Latino of any race were 0.48% of the population.

There were 258 households, out of which 31.0% had children under the age of 18 living with them, 55.0% were married couples living together, 10.5% had a female householder with no husband present, and 29.1% were non-families. 27.9% of all households were made up of individuals, and 14.7% had someone living alone who was 65 years of age or older. The average household size was 2.43 and the average family size was 2.93.

In the village, the population was spread out, with 25.0% under the age of 18, 7.5% from 18 to 24, 24.4% from 25 to 44, 25.3% from 45 to 64, and 17.8% who were 65 years of age or older. The median age was 38 years. For every 100 females there were 98.7 males. For every 100 females age 18 and over, there were 90.7 males.

The median income for a household in the village was $30,865, and the median income for a family was $37,500. Males had a median income of $26,029 versus $18,864 for females. The per capita income for the village was $14,611. About 11.9% of families and 14.5% of the population were below the poverty line, including 28.6% of those under age 18 and 8.6% of those age 65 or over.

== Education ==
Lowell is the home of Lowell Elementary (K–6) which is part of the Fort Frye School District Fort Frye High School and was once the site of Lowell High School, which is no longer in use.

== Historic sites ==
Lowell is the location of Lock #3 on the Muskingum River. It forms an island, Buell Island, named for native son Don Carlos Buell. Some residents of Lowell live on Buell Island, but the island is mostly used for recreation at Buell Park.

Buell Island is also home to the historic Strait Run one room school house. Although the school has been moved from its original location, its structure and furnishings are otherwise intact.

== Notable people ==
- Don Carlos Buell, Major General who fought in the Seminole War, the Mexican–American War, and the American Civil War.
- Lee Fohl, baseball player and manager.
- Dan Hughes, WNBA coach (San Antonio Stars, Seattle Storm)
- Mary Reed (1854-1943), missionary
