= Pawpaw Festival =

Annual festival in Nelsonville, Ohio, US

- Status: active
- Genre: food festivals
- Frequency: Annually
- Location: Nelsonville, Ohio
- Country: United States
- Years active: 26–27
- Inaugurated: October 10, 1999
- Website: www.ohiopawpawfest.com

The Pawpaw Festival or Ohio Pawpaw Festival is an annual festival dedicated to the Pawpaw fruit (Asimina triloba) that is indigenous to the Eastern, Southern, and Midwestern United States, and cultivated in various places such as Athens County, Ohio. There are also various pawpaw festivals in other places where pawpaws grow, although not on such a grand scale as the one in Athens.

The Athens pawpaw festival has been sponsored by the Ohio Pawpaw Growers' Association and various local organizations takes place near Snow Fork Event Center, in Nelsonville, Ohio, in mid-September, which is generally about the peak of the fruit's harvest. Various pawpaw-based treats including brews and other more-or-less pawpaw-related activities are offered. The first Athens Pawpaw Festival took place on October 10, 1999.

== History ==
In 1996, Chris Chmiel founded Integration Acres and, in 1999, the organization began promoting the Pawpaw. In 1999, Chmiel, along with Integration Acres, created the first annual Pawpaw Festival.

In 2000, Chris worked again with the Albany Riding Club and to bring about another festival on September 16. By this time the festival gained some popularity. In 2001, the festival moved to Lake Snowden, the present day location of the festival. Moreover, the birth of the Ohio Pawpaw Growers Association took place.

In 2006, the Pawpaw Festival saw a great change, as the sponsor was that of Snowville Creamery. Memorable events included the Pawpaw Green Woman logo and the fifteen kegs of pawpaw beer.

In 2007, the sponsor of the festival was Ohio's Hill Country Heritage Area program and included live musical band performances, with audio CDs.

In 2008, the Pawpaw festival made itself more accessible, with the assistance of the Office of Sustainability, by offering a shuttle service for those college students that wanted to attend.

In 2009, the festival increased in attendance thanks to the appearance of various officials. The pawpaw became the official state native fruit of Ohio. This year eighteen kegs of pawpaw beer were consumed becoming the most consumed to date.

2010 brought about a longer festival wherein the previous one- and two-day festival periods were increased to three days instead. Most recently in 2011, the 13th annual Pawpaw Festival, it continues to run as a three-day-long event. Also, the 13th annual festival was sponsored by the Ohio's Hill Country Heritage Area program once again.

2026 will be the first year The Ohio Pawpaw Festival, in its 28th year, will be held at Snow Fork Event Center in Nelsonville, Ohio.

== Officials ==
Initially, the Pawpaw Festival, as all things starting out, had not gained enough popularity with the surrounding region. Therefore, the festival needed to find a way in which they could increase their presence within the area. One method would be through the attendance of officials to validate the success of the festival. The first festival brought in individuals from Better Homes and Garden; along with The Washington Post and the Athens County Convention and Visitors Bureau.

The following year, judges for the festival included Sue Dawson and a food editor for the Columbus Dispatch. This pattern continued with more judges to attend and participate in the festivities. Then in 2002 the Director of the Ohio Department of Agriculture, Suzanne Martinson attended. Also in attendance were a food writer from Cleveland and from the Pittsburgh Post-Gazette.

2004 had a special guest appearance from Ohio State House Representative Jimmy Stewart who was the sponsor of a bill to make the pawpaw the official state fruit of Ohio. Finally, in 2009, big name officials like Ohio Representative Debbie Phillips and Ohio Senator Jimmy Stewart attended in order to present Chris Chmiel with an award designating the pawpaw as the official state native fruit of Ohio.

== Activities ==
Within the festival itself there are various pawpaw-related activities one can get involved with including: competition for the best pawpaw, best pawpaw-related work of art, the pawpaw cook-off, and the pawpaw-eating contest.

One can also partake in the other entertainment options such as: the Kids Central, with various hands-on activities and a variety of activities that focus upon pawpaw growing, cooking, genetics, medical use and other topics related to sustainability of the pawpaw environment.

== Entertainment ==
Each year, the Pawpaw Festival is host to a wide variety of local and regional musical acts. The music begins with the festival on Friday afternoon and runs until midnight, followed by music all day Saturday and until the afternoon on Sunday. In 2011, the Pawpaw Festival introduced the Beer Stage, a secondary stage located near the beer tent which hosts smaller acts for shorter sets. According to "The Athens News" the Pawpaw Festival is a good place to experience the music that is offered from the Athens County region.

In addition to music, there are also a variety of cultural and historical demonstrations. The East of the River Shawnee Tribe shares traditional culture and there is an atlatl competition as well as a 1790s frontier camp. Local food and cottage goods vendors set up a wide variety of stands to create a vibrant marketplace.
