= Lake Snowden =

Park in Ohio, United States of America

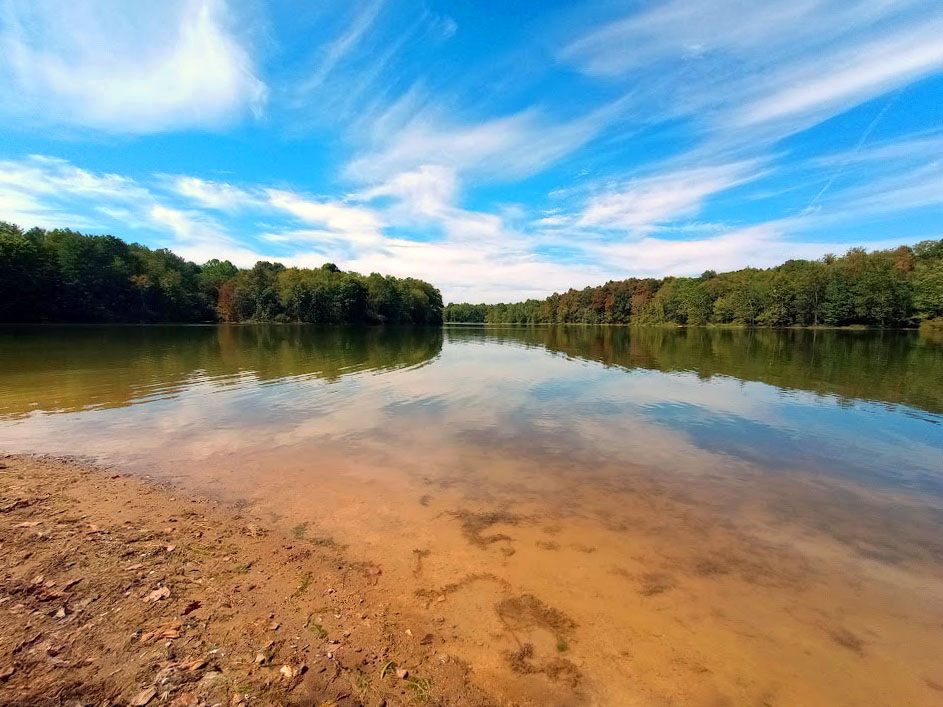
- Lake Snowden
- Interactive map of Lake Snowden
- Location: Athens County, Ohio
- Coordinates: 39°14′58″N 82°11′12″W
- Area: 675 acres (2.73 km^{2})
- Operator: Hocking College
- Website: lakesnowden.com

Lake Snowden is a 675 acres (273 ha) education and recreation park in southeast Ohio, United States. It is 6 miles southwest of Athens and 1 mile northeast of Albany. Lake Snowden is the largest of four lakes which form the Margaret Creek Conservancy District, covering about 136 acres (55 ha) with a maximum lake depth of 42 feet (13 m). The lake provides flood control, water supply, recreational activities, festivals and natural wildlife.

== History ==
Lake Snowden was developed as a part of the PL-566 Margaret Creek Watershed Project with federal funds through the Farmer’s Home Administration and the Soil Conservation Service to try and control flooding in the area. The dam was completed in July 1970 across a branch of Maragret Creek. Recreation pool was achieved in April 1972. It opened to the public in 1972 and in 1998 Lake Snowden was purchased by Hocking College from Le-Ax Water District. The college owns and operates a fish hatchery at Lake Snowden that furthers local fish management and aquaculture. Hocking college also assists the Division of Wildlife in installing deep water fish structures, monitoring fish populations, and monitoring water quality.

== Recreation ==
Lake Snowden offers a wide range of outdoor recreation with a grass and sand beach, swimming area and adjacent fields. Horseback riding and boating are popular, with 12.5 miles (20.1 km) of horse trails and several types of rentable watercraft. There are 125 camp sites in four areas of the park: The Locust Grove, Big Oak camp, Hickory Camp, and Hilltop Camp. The park also has two shelter houses with seating for 75 each for picnicking.

The Ohio Department of Natural Resources orders Lake Snowden to be a "no wake" lake or idle only lake in order to keep the lake's natural beauty and reduce erosion caused by large waves. A boat launching ramp is located on the south side of the lake, near State Route 50.

== Pawpaw Festival ==
The Ohio Pawpaw Festival was held at Lake Snowden around the third weekend of September each year, for the local pawpaw tree fruits. The pawpaw is North America's largest native tree fruit which grows particularly well in Southern Ohio. Some popular events at the festival include the pawpaw cook off, the best pawpaw competition, and the pawpaw eating contest. Several Ohio breweries provide a unique beer brewed with the fruit's pulp at the beer garden.

== Wildlife ==
The wildlife includes whitetail deer, Canada geese, many duck species, beaver, mink, fox, raccoon, squirrel, rabbit and wild turkey. Birdwatching is popular: migrating waterfowl such as canvasback, common goldeneye or ringneck duck can be seen. Bluebirds, song sparrows and northern harrier are also common species to the area.

=== Fishing ===
The primary sport fish species managed are channel catfish, bluegill, redear sunfish, largemouth bass and saugeye. Saugeye are stocked every year and channel catfish yearlings are stocked every other year. According to the Ohio Department of Natural Resources, the lake is one of the finest catfish lakes in southern Ohio with excellent largemouth bass catch rates.
