= Coolville, Ohio =

- Village
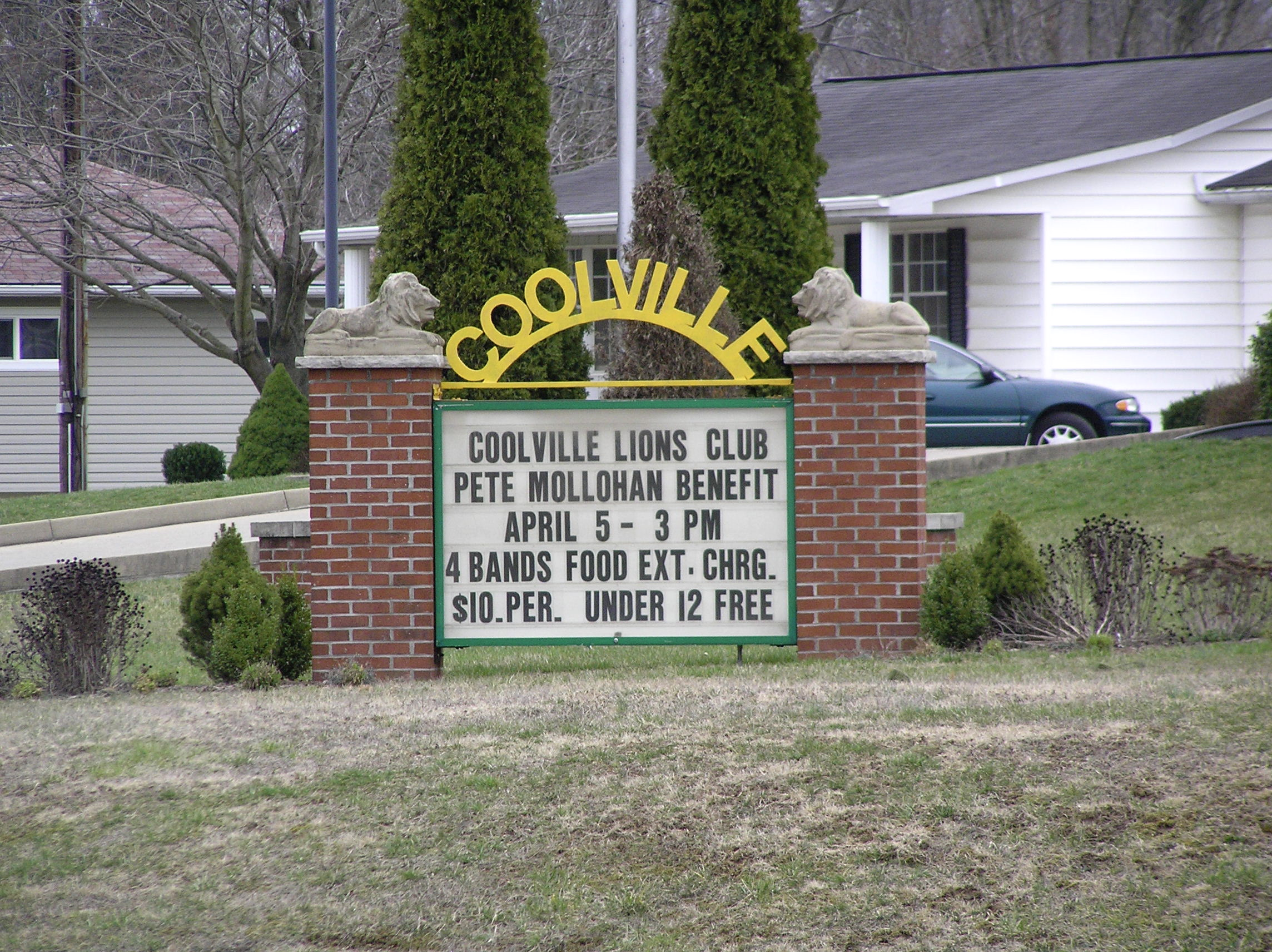

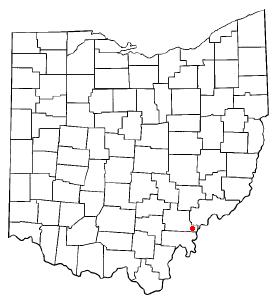
- Location of Coolville, Ohio

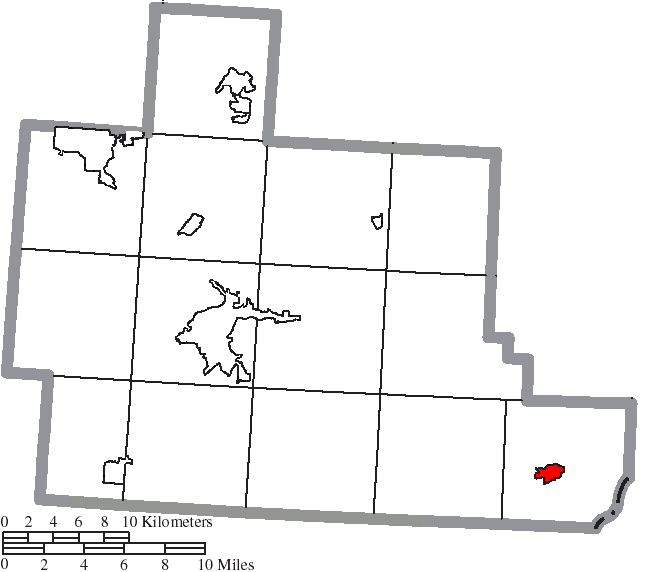
- Location of Coolville in Athens County
- Coordinates: 39°13′09″N 81°47′56″W
- Country: United States
- State: Ohio
- County: Athens
- Township: Troy

Area
  - Total: 1.00 sq mi (2.58 km^{2})
  - Land: 0.98 sq mi (2.54 km^{2})
  - Water: 0.019 sq mi (0.05 km^{2})
- Elevation: 712 ft (217 m)

Population (2020)
  - Total: 454
  - Estimate (2023): 445
  - Density: 463/sq mi (178.8/km^{2})
- Time zone: UTC-5 (Eastern (EST))
  - Summer (DST): UTC-4 (EDT)
- ZIP code: 45723
- Area code: 740
- FIPS code: 39-18588
- GNIS feature ID: 2398623
- Website: villageofcoolville.org

Coolville is a village located in Troy Township, Athens County, Ohio, United States, in the southeast area of the state. The population was 452 at the 2020 census.

== History ==
In 1818 Coolville was platted (laid out by) by Simeon W. Cooley, for whom it is named. The village was incorporated in 1835.

By the 1830s, Coolville contained two stores, a gristmill, and a sawmill.

Coolville has been noted for its unusual place name. The village is located close to three other "hot/cold" communities: Torch and Frost (both unincorporated communities in Athens County), and Snowville in Meigs County.

"Roots" General and Feed store was built in 1846 and still stands as a remodeled home with a business front.

The bank originally was built in the late 1800s on Main St, known today as the "Village Hall".

== Geography ==
It is located on the right bank (west bank) of the Hocking River, a few miles upstream from its confluence with the Ohio River. US 50/SR 32/SR 7, Appalachian Corridor D, bypasses the town on the north side, just outside the built-up area, and provides highway access to the community. OH-144, located on the near bank of the Hocking River, also provides access.

According to the United States Census Bureau, the village has a total area of 0.85 square miles (2.20 km^{2}), of which 0.83 square miles (2.15 km^{2}) is land and 0.02 square miles (0.05 km^{2}) is water.

== Demographics ==
Historical population
Census	Pop.	Note	%±
1870	334		—
1880	323		−3.3%
1890	330		2.2%
1900	315		−4.5%
1910	370		17.5%
1920	457		23.5%
1930	475		3.9%
1940	463		−2.5%
1950	469		1.3%
1960	443		−5.5%
1970	672		51.7%
1980	649		−3.4%
1990	663		2.2%
2000	528		−20.4%
2010	496		−6.1%
2020	454		−8.5%
2023 (est.)	445	▼	−2.0%
U.S. Decennial Census

=== 2010 census ===
As of the census of 2010, there were 496 people, 188 households, and 139 families living in the village. The population density was 597.6 inhabitants per square mile (230.7/km^{2}). There were 218 housing units at an average density of 262.7 per square mile (101.4/km^{2}). The racial makeup of the village was 98.0% White, 0.4% African American, and 1.6% from two or more races. Hispanic or Latino of any race were 0.2% of the population.

There were 188 households, of which 34.6% had children under the age of 18 living with them, 54.3% were married couples living together, 13.3% had a female householder with no husband present, 6.4% had a male householder with no wife present, and 26.1% were non-families. 21.3% of all households were made up of individuals, and 11.7% had someone living alone who was 65 years of age or older. The average household size was 2.64 and the average family size was 3.08.

The median age in the village was 39 years. 25% of residents were under the age of 18; 6.7% were between the ages of 18 and 24; 27.7% were from 25 to 44; 28% were from 45 to 64; and 12.7% were 65 years of age or older. The gender makeup of the village was 48.0% male and 52.0% female.

=== 2000 census ===
As of the census of 2000, there were 528 people, 213 households, and 148 families living in the village. The population density was 627.1 inhabitants per square mile (242.1/km^{2}). There were 232 housing units at an average density of 275.5 per square mile (106.4/km^{2}). The racial makeup of the village was 98.86% White, 0.38% from other races, and 0.76% from two or more races.

There were 213 households, out of which 29.6% had children under the age of 18 living with them, 53.5% were married couples living together, 11.7% had a female householder with no husband present, and 30.5% were non-families. 24.9% of all households were made up of individuals, and 14.6% had someone living alone who was 65 years of age or older. The average household size was 2.48 and the average family size was 2.94.

In the village, the population was spread out, with 25.9% under the age of 18, 6.4% from 18 to 24, 28.2% from 25 to 44, 24.1% from 45 to 64, and 15.3% who were 65 years of age or older. The median age was 36 years. For every 100 females there were 100.8 males. For every 100 females age 18 and over, there were 91.7 males.

The median income for a household in the village was $31,731, and the median income for a family was $37,500. Males had a median income of $38,889 versus $23,500 for females. The per capita income for the village was $17,639. About 12.0% of families and 15.6% of the population were below the poverty line, including 25.9% of those under age 18 and 18.3% of those age 65 or over.

== Education ==
The residents of Coolville are served by the Federal Hocking Local School District and Federal Hocking High School in Stewart. Coolville has a public library, a branch of the Athens County Public Libraries.
