= Fort Frye High School =

Coordinates: 39°32′51″N 81°37′56″W

Location
- 420 5th Street; Beverly, Ohio 45715; United States

Information
- Type: Public high school
- School district: Fort Frye Local School District
- Superintendent: Stephanie Starcher
- CEEB code: 360470
- Principal: Andy Schob
- Teaching staff: 18.00 (FTE)
- Grades: 9-12
- Student to teacher ratio: 12.61
- Campus type: Distant Rural
- Colors: Red, white, and blue
- Athletics conference: Tri-Valley Conference (Ohio)
- Team name: Cadets
- Website: www.fortfrye.k12.oh.us/o/ffhs/

Fort Frye High School is a public high school near Beverly, Ohio, United States. It is the only high school in the Fort Frye Local School District. Athletic teams compete as the Fort Frye Cadets in the Ohio High School Athletic Association as a member of both the Tri-Valley Conference (Ohio).

== District profile ==
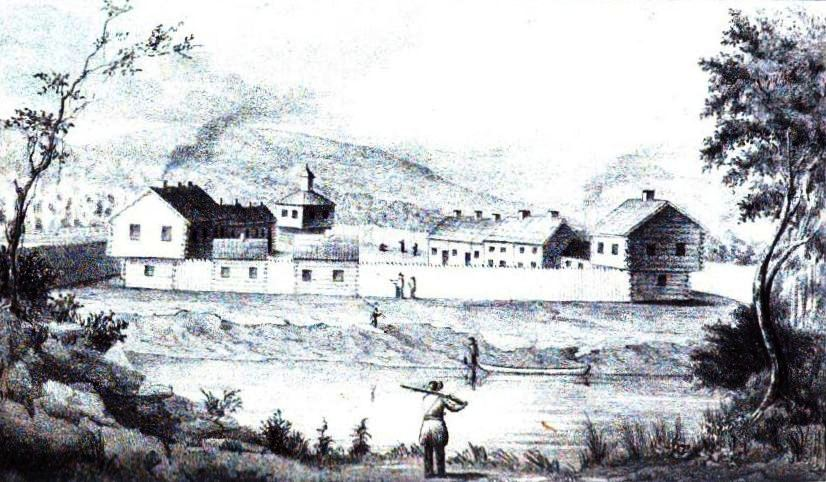
Fort Frye, the namesake of the Fort Frye Local School District

There are three active Elementary Schools in the Fort Frye Local Schools District: Beverly-Center Elementary, Lowell Elementary (Lowell, Ohio), and Salem-Liberty Elementary (Lower Salem, Ohio). Beverly was renamed to Beverly-Center in 2007 after the closing (due mainly to budgetary reasons) of Center Elementary (Hackney, Ohio). Most remaining Center students are now bused to Beverly-Center Elementary. Current superintendent is Dr. Stephanie Starcher. Principals include: Andy Schob at the high school, Krista Ross (Lowell & Salem-Liberty), and Megan Miller (Beverly-Center).

Students and teachers at Fort Frye High School often refer to the school as "The Fort", referencing the pioneer fortification, Fort Frye, built by settlers for protection during the Northwest Indian War.
