= Guysville, Ohio =

Unincorporated community in Ohio, U.S.

Coordinates: 39°17′24″N 81°55′25″W

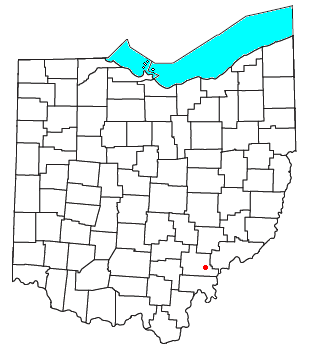
Location of Guysville, Ohio

Guysville is an unincorporated community in southern Rome Township, Athens County, Ohio, United States. It has a post office with the ZIP code 45735.

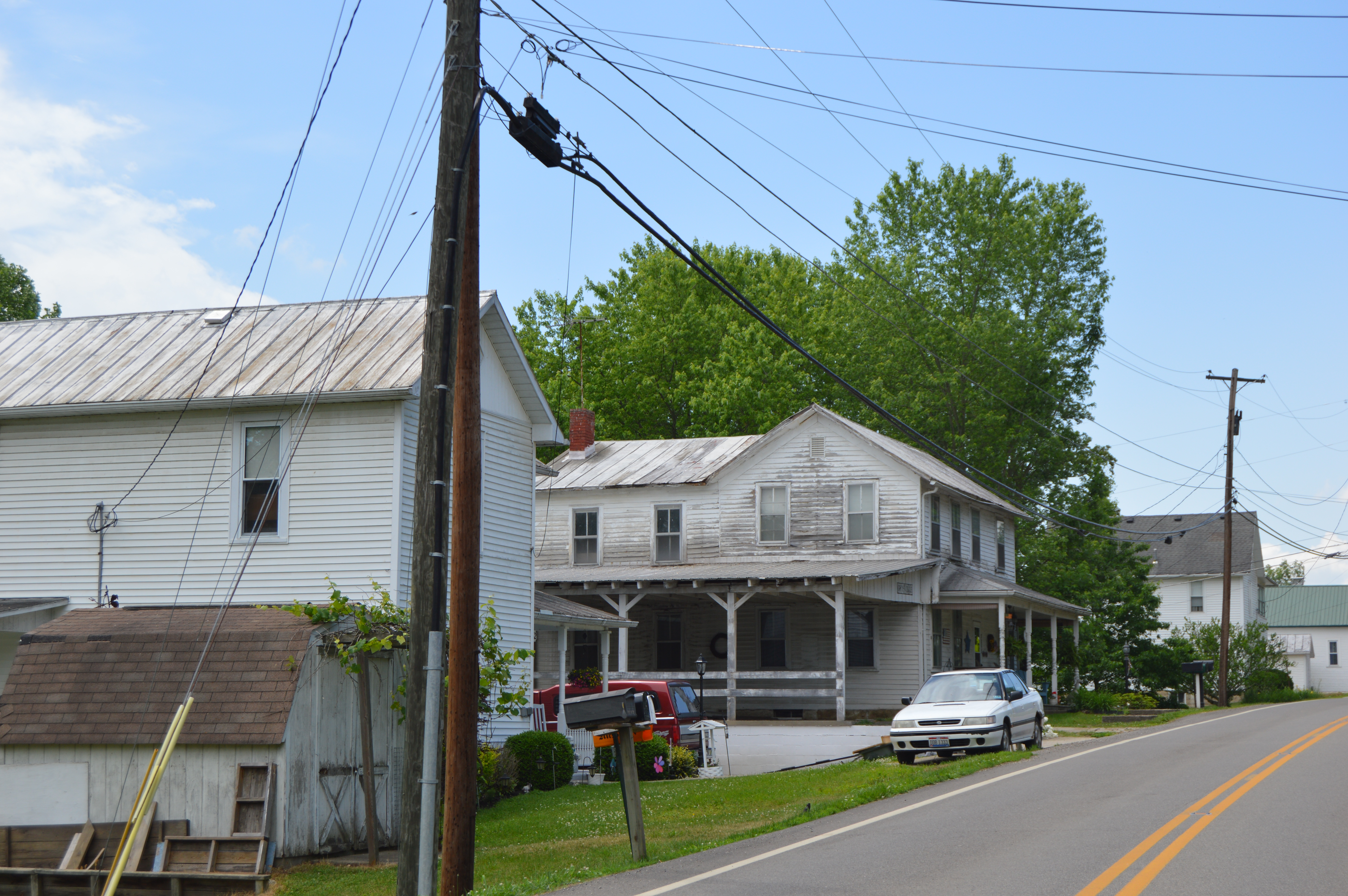
State Route 329 east of Union Street

The town is located on the Hocking River at the junction of U.S. Route 50 and State Route 329.

Guysville was laid out in 1836. A post office has been in operation at Guysville since 1838. The community was named for Guy Barrows, first postmaster.
