= Amesville, Ohio =

- Village
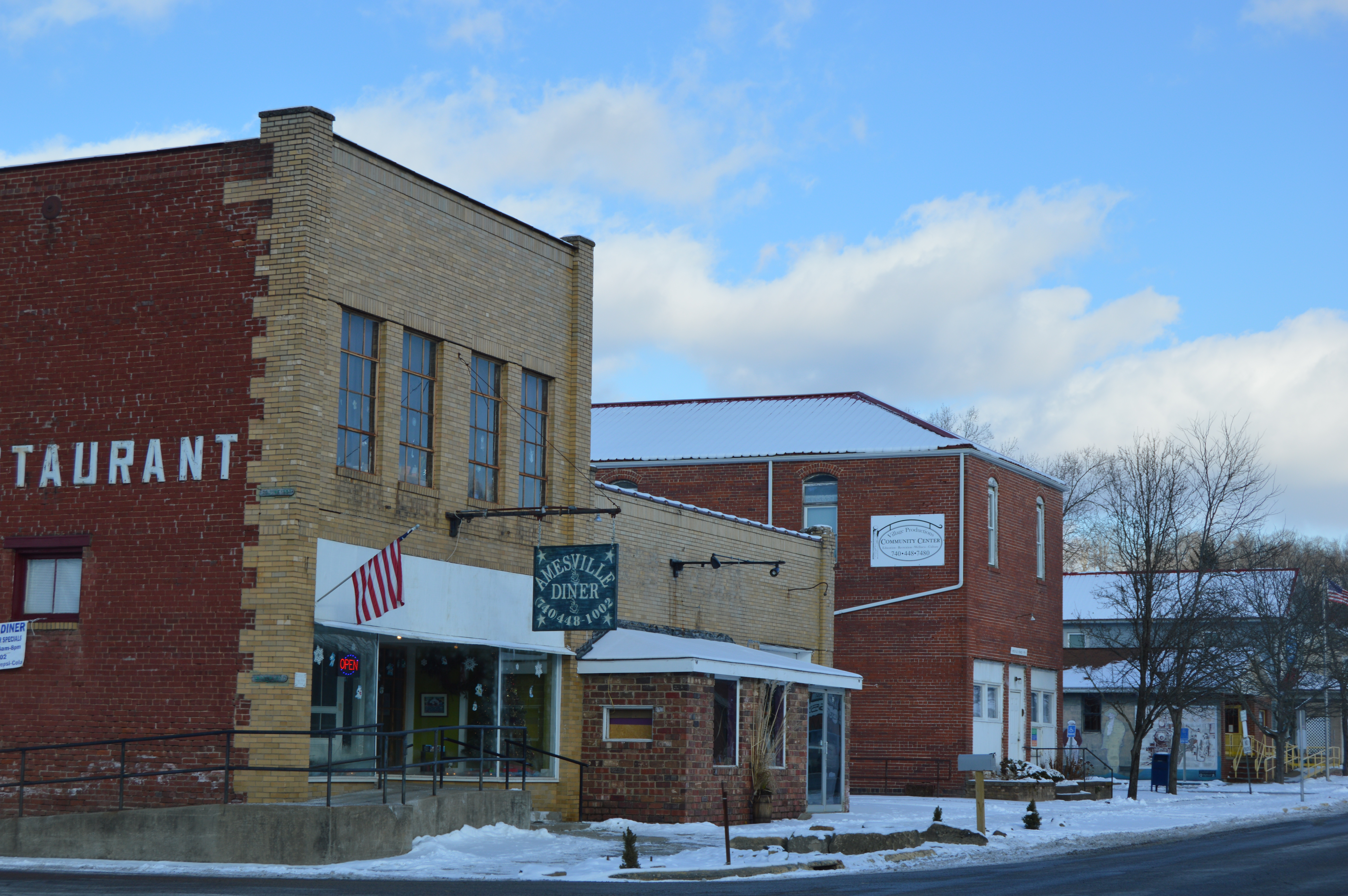
- State Street (State Routes 329/550)

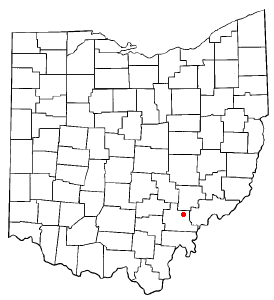
- Location of Amesville, Ohio

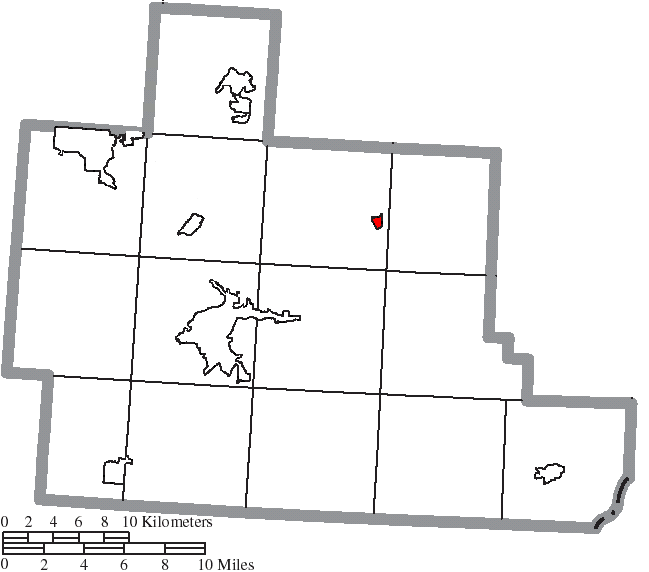
- Location of Amesville in Athens County
- Coordinates: 39°24′05″N 81°57′18″W
- Country: United States
- State: Ohio
- County: Athens
- Township: Ames

Government
  - Type: Town Council

Area
  - Total: 0.23 sq mi (0.60 km^{2})
  - Land: 0.23 sq mi (0.59 km^{2})
  - Water: 0.0039 sq mi (0.01 km^{2})
- Elevation: 637 ft (194 m)

Population (2020)
  - Total: 171
  - Estimate (2023): 170
  - Density: 752.4/sq mi (290.49/km^{2})
- Time zone: UTC-5 (Eastern (EST))
  - Summer (DST): UTC-4 (EDT)
- ZIP codes: 45711, 45777
- Area code: 740
- FIPS code: 39-01784
- GNIS feature ID: 2397956
- Website: Village website

Amesville (/ˈeɪmzvɪl/ AYMZ-vil) is a village in Ames Township, Athens County, Ohio, United States, located on Federal Creek. The population was 171 at the 2020 census.

== History ==
Amesville was laid out in 1837. The village derives its name from Fisher Ames who was instrumental in gaining federal support for the Ohio Company of Associates which managed much of the settlement in the area.

Amesville is perhaps best known for the Coonskin Library. At an 1803 town meeting—held to discuss roads—settlers talked about their desire for books and their lack of money to pay for them. Most of the business was done by barter, so little money was in circulation. However, the surrounding forest had pelts that could be sold in the East to buy books. In the spring of 1804, Samuel B. Brown was given the pelts and, accompanied by Ephraim Cutler, went east to bring back books for the town. Fifty-one books—mostly on religion, travel, biography and history—were purchased for $73.50. These books were passed from home to home until Ephraim Cutler was elected librarian in 1804. The original books can be found at the Ohio Historical Society, as well as Ohio University's Alden Library. A commemorative marker, placed by the Nabby Lee Ames D.A.R. Chapter of Athens in 1925, is located near the Community Bank on State Street. The Coonskin Library Museum opened in May 1994 in the former cafeteria of the Amesville Grade School.

A post office called Amesville was established 1820.

=== Mayor Alonzo Weed ===
Another unique feature of Amesville history was the election of Alonzo Weed as mayor in 1903. Research by Tyler Buchanon, of the Athens Messenger, tells the story of a wandering hobo that became mayor of the village. Alonzo Weed was likely born somewhere on the west coast around 1850. Amesville residents found Weed a strange, but friendly figure. It's hard to say for sure what first prompted his name to get placed on the ballot. In many versions, he was nominated by a few friends on Election Day as a joke.

One way or another, Weed's name was indeed placed on the mayoral ballot of April 1903. The election ended in a tie. Weed and Gibson both received exactly 21 votes. Weed was sworn in as the new mayor of Amesville after a tie-breaker. He proved to be unqualified for the job. He was an alcoholic in a dry town, a drifter with little appreciation or experience with municipal government.

Eventually, Alonzo left town, but not after becoming the center of news stories all across the country.

=== June 1998 Flood ===
On June 28, 1998, a storm front stalled over Federal Creek and dropped over 10 inches of rain. Quickly, Federal Creek rose beyond its banks and crossed State Street and Main Street. It reached a depth of 15 feet at the restaurant on the corner of those two roads. When the water receded it had devastated most of the businesses and houses on the south side of the village. The majority of these buildings were demolished (through FEMA grants) and the resulting open land became Gifford Park.

=== 21st century ===
In 2007 Amesville became the first village in Ohio to pioneer a new, aerobic wastewater treatment system. The village had been grappling with the waste-water issue since at least 1959, when a village ordinance was passed addressing the question, following the contamination of some wells by sewage." The Appalachian Regional Commission awarded a $750,000 grant to the Athens County Commissioners for the project, with the county providing $216,320 in local funds according to a press release from U.S. Senator Sherrod Brown’s office. Athens County Commissioner Chris Chmiel said local funds will be provided through the county’s American Recovery Plan Act dollars."

== Geography ==
Amesville is situated in the foothills of the Appalachian Mountains, approximately 45 miles south by southeast of the terminal moraine, a topographical feature often associated with the boundaries of glaciers, and is surrounded by wooded hills, narrow valleys, and numerous creeks flanked by lowland pastures and farmland.

These features are largely indicative of the areas in the State of Ohio that fall to the south of the terminal moraine. The terminal moraine in the State of Ohio, and to the north of Amesville, effectively serves to bisect the state along a line running on a west to east axis across the south by southeastern third of Ohio thereby contributing to certain distinctive topographical, socio-economic, and cultural attributes on either side of this feature.

According to the United States Census Bureau, the village has a total area of 0.22 square miles (0.57 km^{2}), all land.

=== Climate ===
The climate in this area is characterized by hot, humid summers and generally mild to cool winters. According to the Köppen Climate Classification system, Amesville has a humid subtropical climate, abbreviated "Cfa" on climate maps.

== Demographics ==
Historical population
Census	Pop.	Note	%±
1880	159		—
1910	267		—
1920	273		2.2%
1930	298		9.2%
1940	286		−4.0%
1950	269		−5.9%
1960	255		−5.2%
1970	295		15.7%
1980	247		−16.3%
1990	250		1.2%
2000	184		−26.4%
2010	154		−16.3%
2020	171		11.0%
2023 (est.)	170	▼	−0.6%
U.S. Decennial Census

=== 2010 census ===
As of the census of 2010, there were 154 people, 63 households, and 38 families residing in the village of Amesville, Ohio. The population density was 700.0 inhabitants per square mile (270.3/km^{2}). There were 70 housing units at an average density of 318.2 per square mile (122.9/km^{2}). The racial makeup of the village was 88.3% White, 3.2% African American, 0.6% Native American, 4.5% Asian, and 3.2% from two or more races. Hispanic or Latino of any race were 2.6% of the population.

There were 63 households, of which 27.0% had children under the age of 18 living with them, 46.0% were married couples living together, 9.5% had a female householder with no husband present, 4.8% had a male householder with no wife present, 39.7% were households composed of non-geanologically related persons, 31.7% of all households were made up of sole individuals, and 11.1% had someone living alone who was 65 years of age or older. The average household size was 2.44 and the average family size was 3.03.

The median age in the village was 36.5 years. 25.3% of residents were under the age of 18; 9.7% of residents were between the ages of 18 and 24; 19.3% were from between the ages of 25 and 44; 31.1% were from 45 to 64; and 14.3% were 65 years of age or older. Gender distribution of the village was 48.7% male and 51.3% female.

=== 2000 census ===
As of the census of 2000, there were 184 people, 70 households, and 52 families residing in the village. The population density was 829.8 inhabitants per square mile (320.4/km^{2}). There were 82 housing units at an average density of 369.8 per square mile (142.8/km^{2}). The racial makeup of the village was 95.65% White, 1.09% African American, 1.63% Native American, and 1.63% from two or more races. Hispanic or Latino of any race were 2.17% of the population.

There were 70 households, out of which 44.3% had children under the age of 18 living with them, 50.0% were married couples living together, 22.9% had a female householder with no husband present, and 25.7% were non-families. 22.9% of all households were made up of individuals, and 7.1% had someone living alone who was 65 years of age or older. The average household size was 2.63 and the average family size was 2.90.

In the village, the population was spread out, with 33.2% under the age of 18, 6.0% from 18 to 24, 30.4% from 25 to 44, 20.7% from 45 to 64, and 9.8% who were 65 years of age or older. The median age was 36 years. For every 100 females there were 91.7 males. For every 100 females age 18 and over, there were 73.2 males.

The median income for a household in the village was $35,000, and the median income for a family was $44,000. Males had a median income of $29,583 versus $24,063 for females. The per capita income for the village was $16,554. About 8.3% of families and 8.0% of the population were below the poverty line, including 11.5% of those under the age of eighteen and none of those 65 or over.

== Notable people ==
- Edward Raymond Ames, born in Amesville, bishop of the Methodist Episcopal Church
- Arthur Gish, activist, author and farmer
