= Albany, Ohio =

- Village
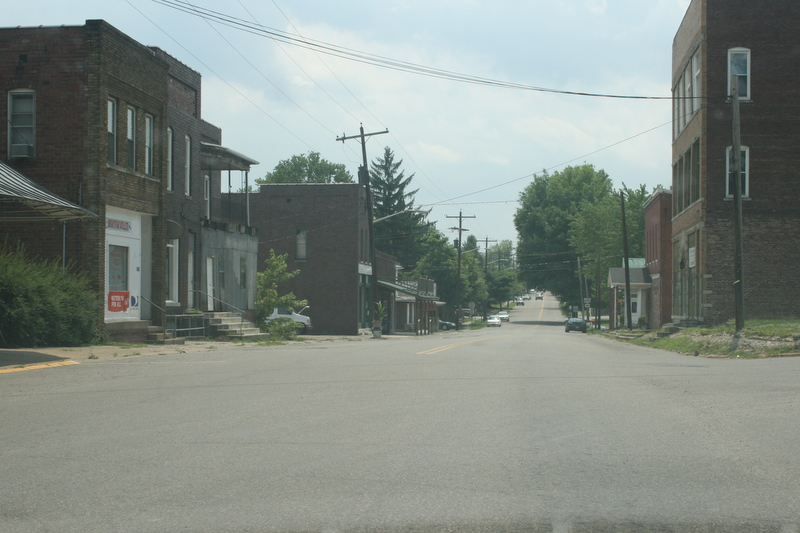
- A view of Albany with State Route 681 in the background

- Logo

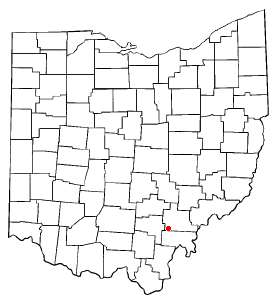
- Location of Albany, Ohio

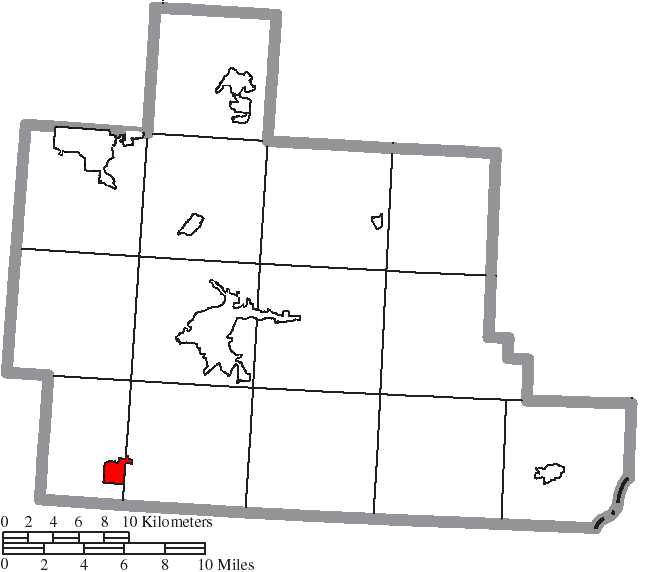
- Location of Albany in Athens County
- Coordinates: 39°13′28″N 82°11′51″W
- Country: United States
- State: Ohio
- County: Athens
- Townships: Lee, Alexander
- Incorporated: 1842

Area
  - Total: 1.35 sq mi (3.49 km^{2})
  - Land: 1.33 sq mi (3.45 km^{2})
  - Water: 0.015 sq mi (0.04 km^{2})
- Elevation: 745 ft (227 m)

Population (2020)
  - Total: 917
  - Estimate (2023): 924
  - Density: 688.2/sq mi (265.72/km^{2})
- Time zone: UTC-5 (Eastern (EST))
  - Summer (DST): UTC-4 (EDT)
- ZIP code: 45710
- Area code: 740
- FIPS code: 39-01042
- GNIS feature ID: 2397922
- Website: albanyoh.org

Albany is a village in Lee and Alexander townships, Athens County, Ohio, United States. The population was 917 at the 2020 census.

== Geography ==
According to the United States Census Bureau, the village has a total area of 1.27 square miles (3.29 km^{2}), of which 1.25 square miles (3.24 km^{2}) is land and 0.02 square miles (0.05 km^{2}) is water.

== History ==
Albany was laid out in about 1832. It was incorporated as a village in 1842.

The small rural village had at least four routes leading into it and became a major stop in Athens County for the Underground Railroad, as fugitives could come upriver on the Hocking River from the Ohio River. Former slaves, many of whom had migrated from the Upper South to escape its slavery and discrimination, settled the village in the mid-19th century.

The black population increased during the 1850s from four in the township to 174 by 1860. In 1860, 70 members of the black community were from the South: 53 from Virginia and 17 from other slave states.

=== African American education in Albany ===
Although Ohio laws made attending public schools difficult for African-American children, private schools in Albany offered educational opportunities to them that were unavailable in most parts of the state.

In 1848, William S. Lewis founded the Lewis Academy, which admitted students regardless of race or gender. Lewis's admission policies were influenced by the liberal ideals of Oberlin College, which he had attended as a student.

In 1850, a joint-stock company took over administration of Lewis Academy, and the name was changed to the Albany Manual Labor Academy, and then later to the Albany Manual Labor University (AMLU). The school continued to admit students of all genders and races. Slaveholders were not permitted to become shareholders. Students with financial need could borrow money from the institution and repay their tuition by working two hours a day in the manual labor department: farming land owned by the school, operating the school's saw-mill, or making bricks.

The academy's constitution stated that the institution's primary goal was:

... to break down, so far as our influence shall extend, the oppressive distinctions on account of caste and color, and counteract, both by example and precept, a spirit of aristocracy, that is spreading itself throughout the land.

The constitution also required that one woman and one African American sit on the board. Philip Clay, a former slave from Virginia who was a successful shoemaker in Albany, was one of the first members of the board. Notable Ohio abolitionists served as trustees and board members, including John Brown, an Albany merchant and activist with the Underground Railroad, and Salmon P. Chase, twice U.S. Senator from Ohio, Governor of Ohio and future Chief Justice of the Supreme Court.

AMLU had its peak enrollment of 284 students in 1857, but suffered financial problems. In 1862, a denominational church group, Albany's Free Will Baptists, took over management of the school. They ended the admission of African Americans. The outbreak of the Civil War resulted in a decline in the number of students, and the academy closed.

To ensure the education of their children, African Americans from the county and state founded the private Albany Enterprise Academy in 1862. It was the first school in Athens County founded exclusively by and for African Americans. It operated until 1886. Founders included leaders of the black community such as Thomas Jefferson Furguson (co-founder of the Ohio Colored Teacher's Association, member of the Albany City Council, and the first black to serve on a jury in Athens County), Cornelius Berry (father of Edward Berry of the Berry Hotel), Philip Clay, David Norman, Woodrow Wiley, and Jackson Wiley. A two-story building was constructed and the school opened in 1864, with 49 students already enrolled.

In 1864, the board advertised their academy in a broadsheet, saying:

The School will be owned and managed by colored persons; but this does not in our opinion make an argument against it.

The day has gone by for the colored man to be used as a mere machine. He must now reflect the light of his own intellectual and moral development, must either shine in the effulgence of his own wisdom, or sink to poverty and wretchedness by his own ignorance.

The Enterprise Academy had in "excess of one hundred students" in its early years of operation (for comparison, about the same number then enrolled at Ohio University at the same time). With the increase in students, a second building for a girl's dormitory was built in 1870. By the late 1870s, many blacks had left the area for work in larger cities and local public integrated schools were available. As a result, the Enterprise Academy suffered declining enrollment; it closed in 1886.

=== May 1911 Fire ===
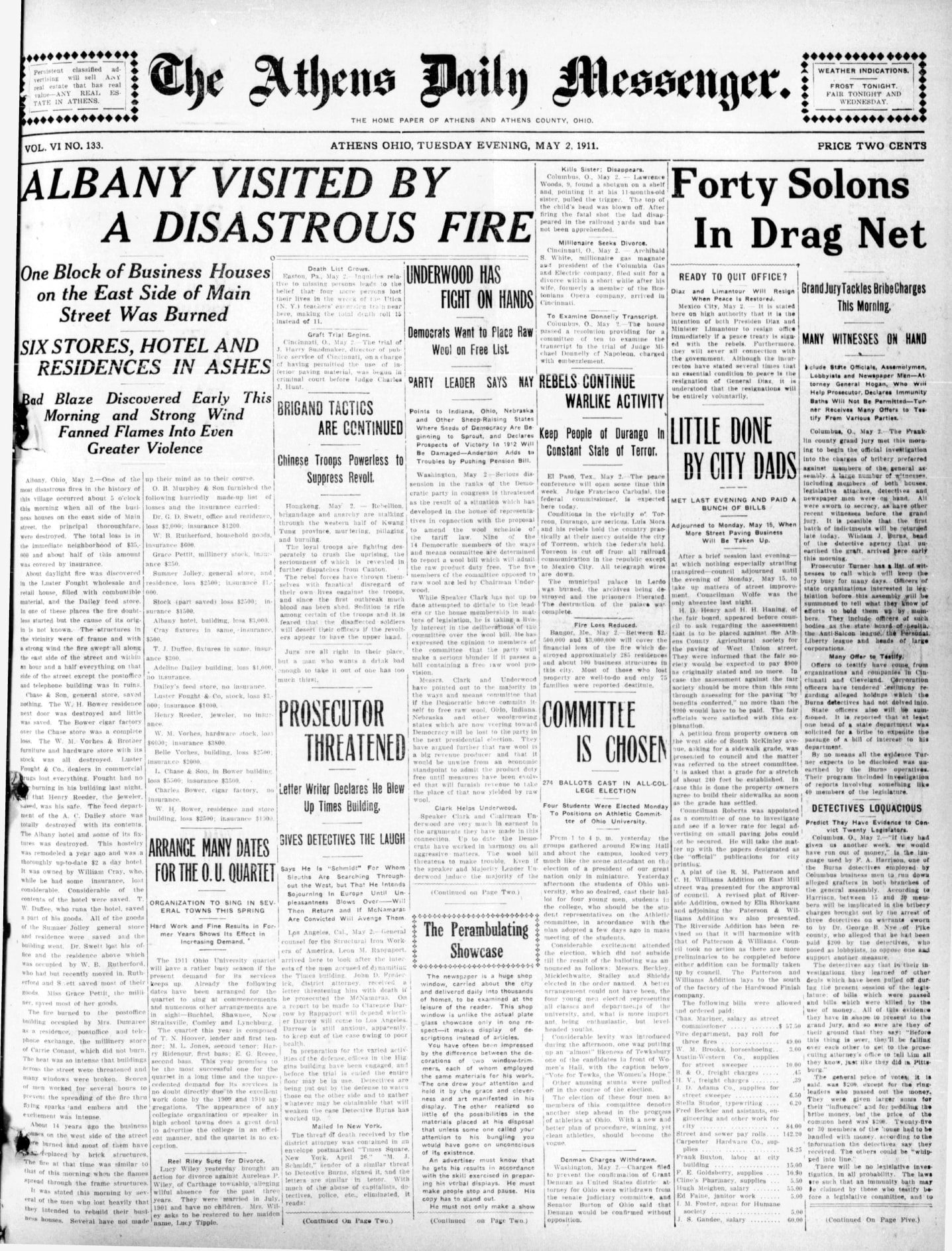

In the predawn hours of May 2, 1911, one of the most disastrous fires to ever happen in the village destroyed an entire block in downtown Albany. Six stores, a hotel, and several residences burned to the ground. A strong wind helped the fire grow throughout the wood-framed structures. Within just an hour and a half all of the buildings on that side of Main Street were destroyed except for the post office and telephone building. The heat was so intense that buildings across the street were threatened and many windows were broken. Scores of men worked several hours to contain the fire and keep it from spreading further.

14 years earlier the other side of this block burned and most of those buildings were rebuilt with brick structures.

== Demographics ==
Historical population
Census	Pop.	Note	%±
1870	480		—
1880	469		−2.3%
1890	471		0.4%
1900	548		16.3%
1910	546		−0.4%
1920	465		−14.8%
1930	471		1.3%
1940	551		17.0%
1950	525		−4.7%
1960	629		19.8%
1970	899		42.9%
1980	905		0.7%
1990	795		−12.2%
2000	808		1.6%
2010	828		2.5%
2020	917		10.7%
2023 (est.)	924	▲	0.8%
U.S. Decennial Census

=== 2020 census ===
As of the census of 2020, there were 917 people, 360 households, and 212 families living in the village. There were 444 housing units, 74.2% were owner-occupied, 25.8% were renter-occupied. The racial makeup of the village was 97.8% White, 1.0% African American, and 1.2% from some other race. (3 Native American, 5 Asian) The median Household income was $26,333.00.

There were 347 households, of which 26.1% had children under the age of 18 living with them, 40.6% were married couples living together, 35.0% had a female householder with no husband present, 19.4% had a male householder with no wife present. 26.1% of all households were made up of individuals living alone, and 13.9% had someone living alone who was 65 years of age or older. The average household size was 2.22 and the average family size was 2.91.

The median age in the village was 42.4 years. 19.4% of residents were under the age of 18; 8.6% were between the ages of 18 and 24; 24.9% were from 25 to 44; 7.7% were from 45 to 54; 13.1% were from 55 to 64, 11.8% were from 65 to 74, and 10.6% were 75 years or older. The gender makeup of the village was 42.7% male and 57.3% female. There were 74.6 males for every 100 females.

=== 2010 census ===
As of the census of 2010, there were 828 people, 347 households, and 230 families living in the village. The population density was 662.4 inhabitants per square mile (255.8/km^{2}). There were 400 housing units at an average density of 320.0 per square mile (123.6/km^{2}). The racial makeup of the village was 98.3% White, 0.1% African American, 0.1% Native American, 0.7% Asian, 0.4% from other races, and 0.4% from two or more races. Hispanic or Latino of any race were 1.6% of the population.

There were 347 households, of which 29.1% had children under the age of 18 living with them, 49.0% were married couples living together, 12.7% had a female householder with no husband present, 4.6% had a male householder with no wife present, and 33.7% were non-families. 30.3% of all households were made up of individuals, and 12.1% had someone living alone who was 65 years of age or older. The average household size was 2.32 and the average family size was 2.83.

The median age in the village was 40.8 years. 21.3% of residents were under the age of 18; 6.9% were between the ages of 18 and 24; 26.6% were from 25 to 44; 26.6% were from 45 to 64; and 18.6% were 65 years of age or older. The gender makeup of the village was 45.9% male and 54.1% female.

=== 2000 census ===
As of the census of 2000, there were 808 people, 352 households, and 222 families living in the village. The population density was 649.6 inhabitants per square mile (250.8/km^{2}). There were 400 housing units at an average density of 321.6 per square mile (124.2/km^{2}). The racial makeup of the village was 97.28% White, 1.11% African American, 0.12% Native American, 0.12% Asian, 0.12% Pacific Islander, 0.87% from other races, and 0.37% from two or more races. Hispanic or Latino of any race were 1.49% of the population.

There were 352 households, out of which 26.7% had children under the age of 18 living with them, 51.4% were married couples living together, 9.4% had a female householder with no husband present, and 36.9% were non-families. 32.7% of all households were made up of individuals, and 10.2% had someone living alone who was 65 years of age or older. The average household size was 2.23 and the average family size was 2.81.

In the village, the population was spread out, with 20.7% under the age of 18, 8.5% from 18 to 24, 29.6% from 25 to 44, 24.8% from 45 to 64, and 16.5% who were 65 years of age or older. The median age was 40 years. For every 100 females, there were 94.2 males. For every 100 females age 18 and over, there were 85.8 males.

The median income for a household in the village was $31,534, and the median income for a family was $42,750. Males had a median income of $30,750 versus $22,083 for females. The per capita income for the village was $16,047. About 8.3% of families and 13.2% of the population were below the poverty line, including 22.6% of those under age 18 and 15.0% of those age 65 or over.

== Education ==
Public Education in the village of Albany is provided by the Alexander Local School District. Campuses serving the village include Alexander Elementary School (Grades PK-5), Alexander Middle School (Grades 6–8), and Alexander High School (Grades 9–12).

Albany has a public library, a branch of the Athens County Public Libraries.
