= Alexander High School (Ohio) =

High school in Albany, Ohio, United States

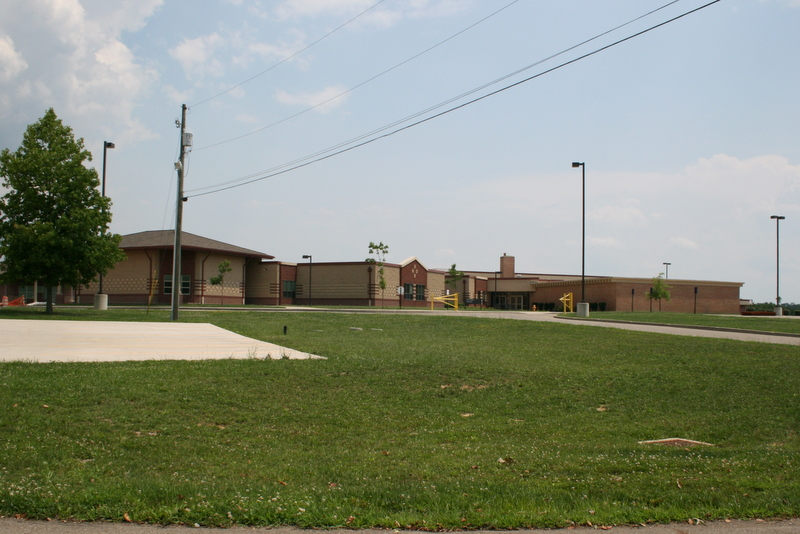

Location
- 6125 School Road; Albany, (Athens County), Ohio 45710; United States; 39°13′33″N 82°12′24″W

Information
- Type: Public, Coeducational
- School district: Alexander Local School District
- Superintendent: William Hampton
- Principal: Lee Raines
- Teaching staff: 54.33 (FTE)
- Grades: 6-12
- Enrollment: 728 (2023-2024)
- Student to teacher ratio: 13.40
- Colors: Red, Black and White
- Athletics conference: Tri-Valley Conference - Ohio Division
- Team name: Spartans
- Accreditation: North Central Association of Colleges and Schools
- Newspaper: Spartan Times
- Website: http://www.alexanderschools.org
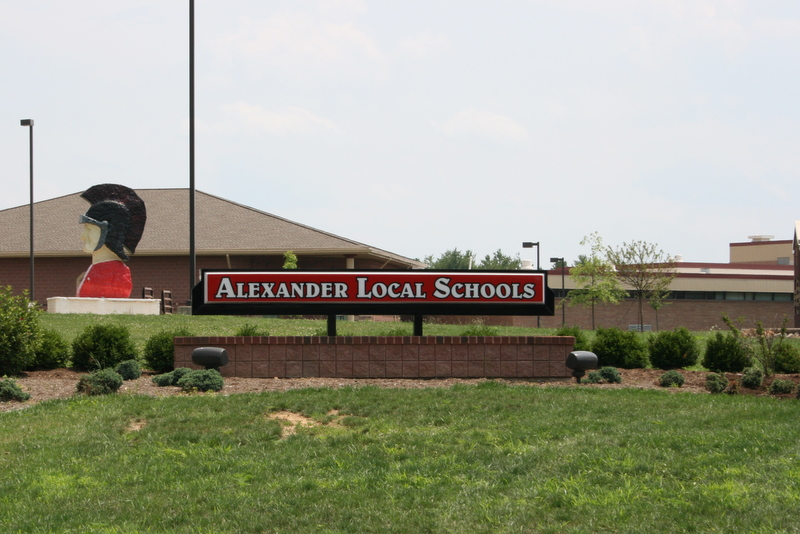
- Alexander Local Schools Sign & Spartan Mascot

Alexander High School (AHS) is located in Albany, Athens County, Ohio, United States. It is the only high school in the Alexander Local School District. The K-12 school complex is located just off SR 32 east of Albany. The Alexander Local School District serves students west and south of the city of Athens including residents in Albany, New Marshfield, Shade, and sections of extreme northeast Meigs County. The school mascot is a Spartan. Their school colors are red, black, and white.

== Athletics ==
The Spartans belong to the Ohio High School Athletic Association (OHSAA) and the Tri-Valley Conference, a 16-member athletic conference located in southeastern Ohio. The conference is divided into two divisions based on school size. The Ohio Division features the larger schools, including Alexander, and the Hocking Division features the smaller schools.

Ohio High School Athletic Association state championships

- Girls' Volleyball - 2008 State Champions (28-1)

== See also ==
- Ohio High School Athletic Conferences
