= Stewart, Ohio =

- Census-designated place
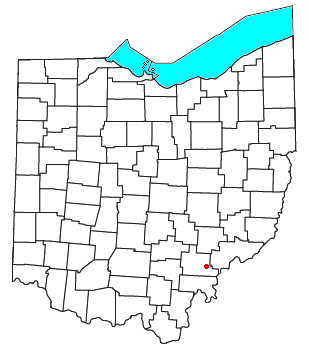
- Location of Stewart, Ohio
- Coordinates: 39°18′29″N 81°53′51″W
- Country: United States
- State: Ohio
- County: Athens
- Township: Rome
- Platted: 1875
- Elevation: 673 ft (205 m)

Population (2020)
  - Total: 221
- Time zone: UTC-5 (Eastern (EST))
  - Summer (DST): UTC-4 (EDT)
- ZIP code: 45778
- Area code: 740
- GNIS feature ID: 2628972

Stewart is an unincorporated community and census-designated place in central Rome Township, Athens County, Ohio, United States. The population was 221 at the 2020 census. It has a post office with the ZIP code 45778.

== History ==
Stewart was laid out in 1875, when the railroad was extended to that point. The community was named for Daniel Bertine Stewart, the original owner of the town site. A post office has been in operation at Stewart since 1874.

== Geography ==
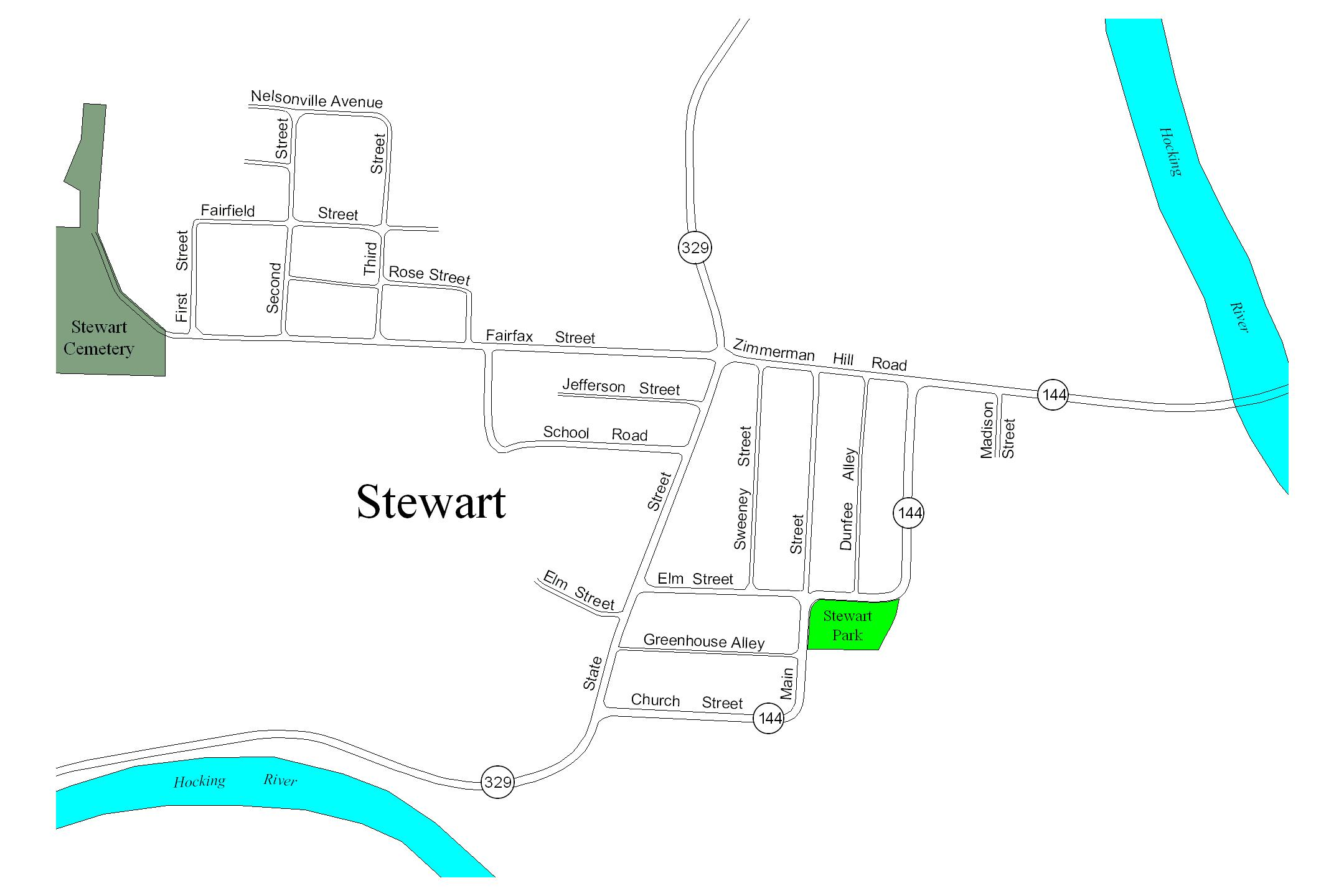
Street map of Stewart, Ohio

Stewart is located along the Hocking River, just upstream from the confluence of Federal Creek with the river. It is located at the intersection of State Routes 144 and 329.
