= National Register of Historic Places listings in Athens County, Ohio =

Location of Athens County in Ohio

This is a list of the National Register of Historic Places listings in Athens County, Ohio.

This is intended to be a complete list of the properties and districts on the National Register of Historic Places in Athens County, Ohio, United States. The locations of National Register properties and districts for which the latitude and longitude coordinates are included below, may be seen in an online map.

There are 28 properties and districts listed on the National Register in the county, including 1 National Historic Landmark.

This National Park Service list is complete through NPS recent listings posted May 1, 2026.

== Current listings ==
	Name on the Register	Image	Date listed	Location	City or town	Description
1	Athens B & O Train Depot	Athens B & O Train Depot	January 11, 1983 (#83001944)	Depot St. 39°19′44″N 82°06′21″W	Athens	The former railroad station for the B&O Railroad, an east-west line through Athens County.
2	Athens County Infirmary	Athens County Infirmary	May 1, 2003 (#03000323)	13183 State Route 13; 39°23′34″N 82°07′08″W	Dover Township	Currently known as "The County Farm" or "The County Home." Today, it houses Job & Family Services.
3	Athens Downtown Historic District	Athens Downtown Historic District	September 30, 1982 (#82003541)	N. Court St. between Carpenter and Union Sts. and Congress and College Sts. 39°19′48″N 82°06′04″W	Athens	
4	Athens Governmental Buildings	Athens Governmental Buildings	November 29, 1979 (#79001782)	E. State, E. Washington, Court, and W. Union Sts. 39°19′35″N 82°06′02″W	Athens	
5	Athens State Hospital	Athens State Hospital	March 11, 1980 (#80002936)	State Route 682 and Richland Ave. 39°18′56″N 82°06′07″W	Athens	The former state mental hospital, and formerly a working farm. Today owned by Ohio University and known as The Ridges.
6	Athens State Hospital Cow Barn	Athens State Hospital Cow Barn	April 25, 1978 (#78002003)	Southwest of Athens off U.S. Route 33; 39°18′52″N 82°06′55″W	Athens Township	Today known as the Dairy Barn; an art gallery
7	Beasley Building	Beasley Building	October 7, 1982 (#82001358)	93 W. Union St. 39°19′44″N 82°06′18″W	Athens	Currently known as Beasley Mills and used as subsidized apartments.
8	Blackwood Covered Bridge	Blackwood Covered Bridge	June 23, 1978 (#78002004)	South of Athens on County Road 46; 39°11′50″N 81°58′29″W	Lodi Township	Covered bridge on Blackwood Road (County Road 46) in southern Lodi Township, over the Shade River.
9	Joseph Clester House	Joseph Clester House	November 26, 1980 (#80002940)	Southeast of Chauncey; 39°22′36″N 82°05′53″W	Dover Township	
10	Manasseh Cutler Hall, Ohio University	Manasseh Cutler Hall, Ohio University	October 15, 1966 (#66000604)	Ohio University campus 39°19′34″N 82°06′02″W	Athens	The oldest building on the Ohio University campus; fronts on College Green
11	Dew House	Dew House	October 2, 1978 (#78002006)	Public Square; 39°27′36″N 82°13′56″W	Nelsonville	
12	East State Street-Elmwood Place Historic District	East State Street-Elmwood Place Historic District	October 8, 2010 (#10000872)	138-234 and 169-277 E. State St.; 5-73, 6-74 Elmwood Place; 39°20′12″N 82°05′41″W	Athens	
13	Federalton	Federalton	August 13, 1976 (#76001369)	Northeast corner of Ohio State Route 329 and Zimmerman Hill Road in Stewart; 39°18′31″N 81°53′40″W	Rome Township	Built in 1817. Formerly 51 State Street.
14	Thomas Jefferson Herrold House and Store	Thomas Jefferson Herrold House and Store	November 21, 1980 (#80002937)	234 W. Washington St. 39°19′56″N 82°06′37″W	Athens	On northeast corner of Washington Street and Shafer Street: When built, this section of Washington Street was Dean Street, and this section of Shafer Street was Cemetery Street.
15	Hocking Valley Coal Company Town Historic District	Hocking Valley Coal Company Town Historic District	June 22, 2007 (#07000579)	Jackson Dr. and Arbor Dr. in The Plains; 39°21′51″N 82°07′04″W	Athens Township	Today this is known as Eclipse Village and is used for offices, residences, and a gathering hall. The photograph is of the restored company store.
16	Hocking Valley Railway Historic District	Hocking Valley Railway Historic District	May 5, 1988 (#88000451)	Roughly between Bridge #494 in Logan and Bridge #629 in Nelsonville; 39°27′31″N 82°14′01″W	Nelsonville and York Township	Extends into Hocking County
17	Kidwell Covered Bridge	Kidwell Covered Bridge	April 11, 1977 (#77001042)	1 mile north of Truetown; 39°27′21″N 82°06′13″W	Dover Township	On Monserat Ridge Road between Ohio State Route 685 and Ohio State Route 13.
18	Mount Zion Baptist Church	Mount Zion Baptist Church	October 3, 1980 (#80002938)	Congress and Carpenter Sts. 39°19′57″N 82°06′07″W	Athens	A traditional black church on the northern fringe of downtown Athens
19	Nelsonville Historic District	Nelsonville Historic District	June 14, 1996 (#96000672)	Roughly bounded by Canal, Jefferson, Scott, and Madison Sts. 39°27′42″N 82°13′57″W	Nelsonville	The central Nelsonville Business District; includes Stuart's Opera House
20	Ohio University Campus Green Historic District	Ohio University Campus Green Historic District	June 11, 1979 (#79001783)	Ohio University campus 39°19′34″N 82°06′01″W	Athens	The original area of Ohio University, used for over 200 years; fronted on by Cutler Hall
21	Palos Covered Bridge	Palos Covered Bridge	November 11, 1977 (#77001041)	1 mile north of Glouster off State Route 13; 39°31′31″N 82°04′19″W	Trimble Township	Over Sunday Creek
22	Savage-Stewart House	Savage-Stewart House	February 8, 1980 (#80002939)	Southeast of Canaanville on Canaanville Road; 39°18′43″N 81°58′33″W	Canaan Township	An historic orange brick house, now in severe disrepair.
23	Sheltering Arms Hospital	Sheltering Arms Hospital	June 25, 1982 (#82003542)	Clark St. 39°20′08″N 82°06′43″W	Athens	A birthing center began in a private home at 19 Clark Street. This grew to include a neighboring house, with additional structures built on. Its successor is nearby O'Bleness Memorial Hospital. The Sheltering Arms structure today houses subsidized apartments.
24	Stedman-Shafer Grocery Warehouse Building		September 10, 2020 (#100005540)	21 North Shafer St. 39°19′58″N 82°06′38″W	Athens	
25	Stuart's Opera House	Stuart's Opera House	December 29, 1978 (#78002007)	Public Sq. and Washington St. 39°27′39″N 82°13′55″W	Nelsonville	Renovated once, then burned, then renovated again and today used for plays, music events, and other activities.
26	Sunday Creek Coal Company Mine No. 6	Sunday Creek Coal Company Mine No. 6	May 23, 1978 (#78002005)	East of East Millfield; 39°26′00″N 82°04′39″W	Dover Township	Site of the Millfield Mine disaster.
27	Weethee Historic District	Weethee Historic District	January 7, 1980 (#80002941)	North of Millfield; 39°27′10″N 82°05′41″W	Dover Township	This property, on the upper end of Bell Road (beyond this house), once housed a small college.
28	White's-Vale Mill	White's-Vale Mill	July 29, 1982 (#82003543)	State Route 682; 39°19′16″N 82°07′32″W	Athens Township	This site today, known as White's Mill, houses a nursery and feed store.
29	Wolf Plains	Wolf Plains	May 31, 1974 (#74001399)	In the vicinity of The Plains; 39°22′30″N 82°07′27″W	Athens Township	A Late Adena culture group of 30 earthworks including 22 conical mounds and nine circular enclosures, located a few miles to the northwest of Athens

== See also ==
- List of National Historic Landmarks in Ohio
- Listings in neighboring counties: Hocking, Meigs, Morgan, Perry, Vinton, Washington, Wood (WV)
- National Register of Historic Places listings in Ohio
