= College Green of Ohio University =

- Ohio University College Green
- U.S. National Register of Historic Places
- U.S. National Historic Landmark
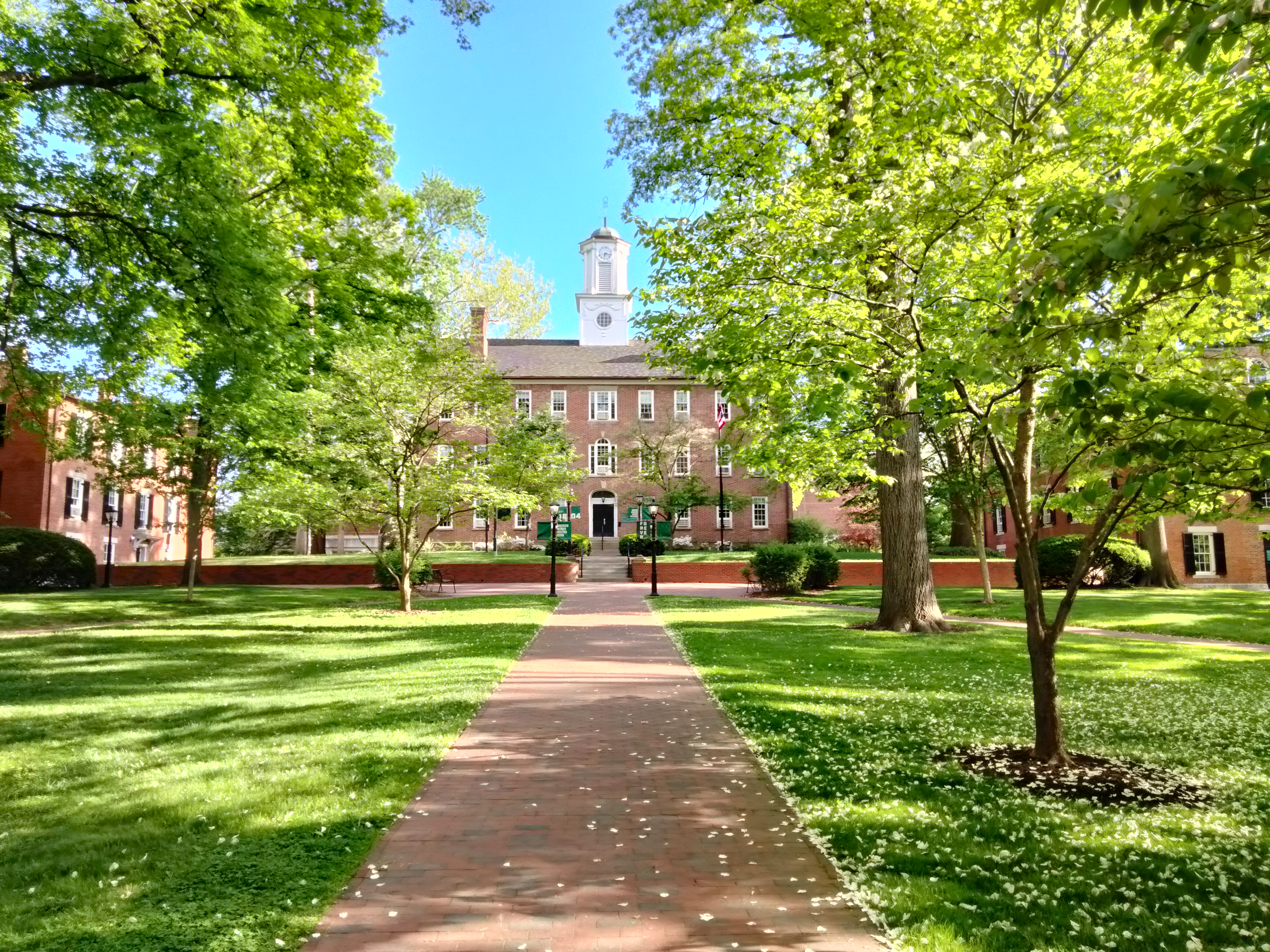
- College Green

- Location within Ohio Location within the United States
- Location: Ohio University, Athens, Ohio
- Coordinates: 39°19′34″N 82°06′01″W
- Area: 10 acres (4.0 ha)
- Built: 1804
- Architectural style: Colonial Revival & Federal
- NRHP reference No.: 79001783
- Designated NHL: June 11, 1979

The College Green of Ohio University is the university's central wooded lawn which saw the first academic buildings in the former Northwest Territory. The yard sits roughly aligned to cardinal directions, with Manasseh Cutler Hall facing true north. The green, at the heart of the Athens campus, is surrounded by administrative, academic, and library buildings named for pivotal leaders in university history, including Manasseh Cutler, Robert Wilson, William McGuffey, and Vernon Alden. The three most prominent structures on College Green, all over 200 years old and made of red brick, are featured on the official university logo and set the university's Federal appearance: Cutler Hall, originally constructed in 1816 as the College Edifice but not officially open until 1819 due to a fire, is the home of the president's office; Wilson Hall built 1837 houses the college of arts and sciences; and McGuffey Hall was built 1839. For most of the nineteenth and twentieth century, College Green saw small memorials and wartime monuments dedicated in remembrance of the people involved in those centuries' great conflicts. The green is the centerpiece of a historic district listed on the National Register of Historic Places in 1979, encompassing the collegiate yard, flanking buildings, and other nearby campus buildings.

College Green is based upon the classic layout of traditional English and New England towns and is similar to other university quadrangles. College Green features Galbreath Chapel, the spire of which, topped with a brass weather vane, is modeled after that of the portico of Nash's All Souls Church in London. Other buildings on the College Green include Chubb Hall, home to undergraduate admissions as well as the offices of the bursar and registrar; Ellis Hall, home to the departments of English, classics, religious studies, and philosophy (built in the early 20th century entirely with state funding); Templeton-Blackburn Memorial Auditorium; as well as Bryan Hall, an upperclassman residence hall. The university aundial, located behind Galbreath Chapel, was constructed in 1907 and marks the original location of the university's first building.

A plaque embedded on the green's main walkway notes: College Green, which was home to the first Ohio University students almost two centuries ago, welcomes all who walk its paths, and embodies the openness and democratic spirit that define Ohio University. President Lyndon Johnson's first ever public reference to the Great Society took place during a speech to students on May 7, 1964, on the College Green:

And with your courage and with your compassion and your desire, we will build a Great Society. It is a Society where no child will go unfed, and no youngster will go unschooled.

President Johnson later formally presented his specific goals for the Great Society in another speech at the University of Michigan in Ann Arbor Friday May 22, 1964. The College Green has been frequently referenced in Athens literature and music. Its gateway is used by the entering freshman class upon their official university convocation, and is also the site of the international promenade during the university's international week. The College Green has been the site of musical performances, protests, progressive movements, and patriotic displays. Most of the university student body passes through College Green at some point in their time as a student because of the presence of the registrar and bursar there. For almost all of its life, the College Green has welcomed tourists and visitors who want to see its prominent stature in Ohio and American history. Wolfe Garden is located on the south-central edge of College Green, between Alden Library and Cutler Hall; a low stone wall around the garden defines a shape approximating that of the State of Ohio. The "Green Lady", a statue officially called Woman by sculptor David Hostetler, is a popular landmark at Wolfe Garden. The amphitheater on the southwestern corner of the College Green evokes the classical inspiration of the Athens campus, recalling the epic and dramatic arts of the Old World.

College Green is framed by two main university gateways: Alumni Gateway and the College Gates. Alumni Gateway, built in 1915, features the text "That thou Mayest Grow In Knowledge, Wisdom and Love", borrowed from the Latin phrase inscribed over a gateway to the University of Padua, and was dedicated upon the 100th anniversary of the university's first graduating class. The newer College Gate, built in the 1960s, features words taken from the Northwest Ordinance of 1787 regarding public education. Traditions surrounding College Green include the latter half of first year convocation, where students, led by the Ohio University Marching 110, march up Richland Avenue, onto Presidents Street, turning north onto Court Street, and entering the green through the College Gate at the corner of Court and Union Streets. From there, a large involvement fair is held where students find their clubs they wish to be involved with.

Notable features of College Green include:

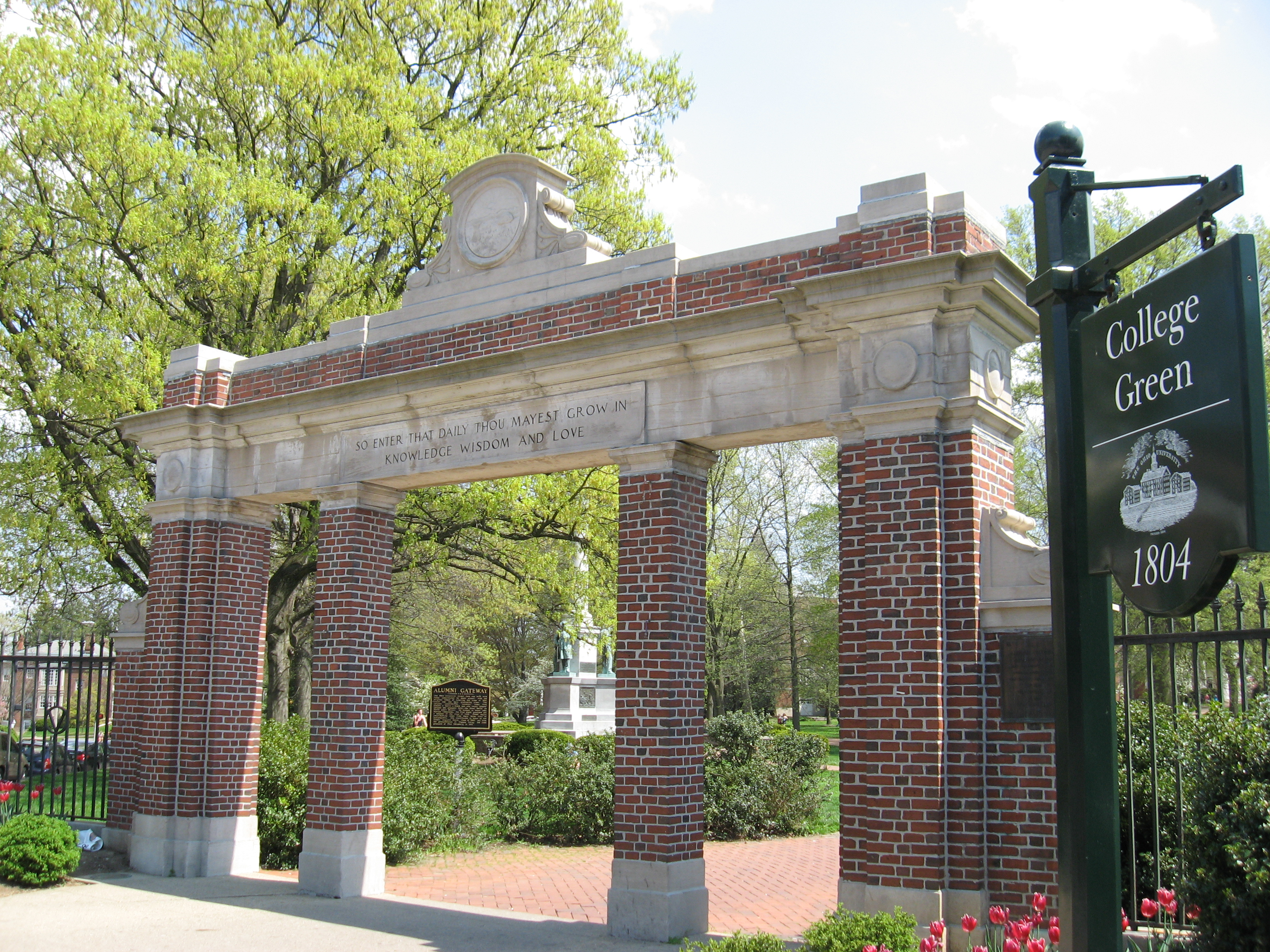
Alumni Gateway

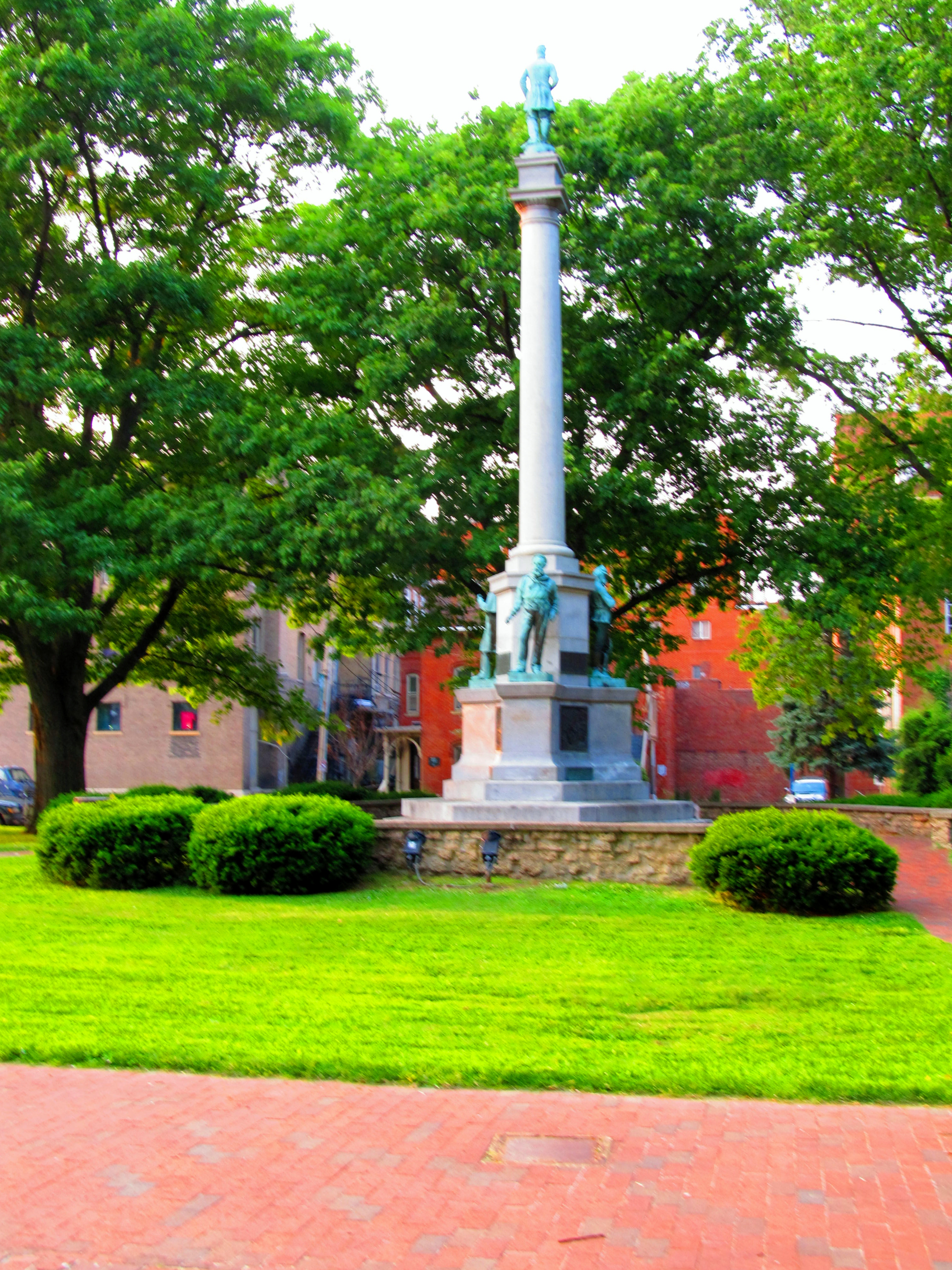
Civil War Memorial

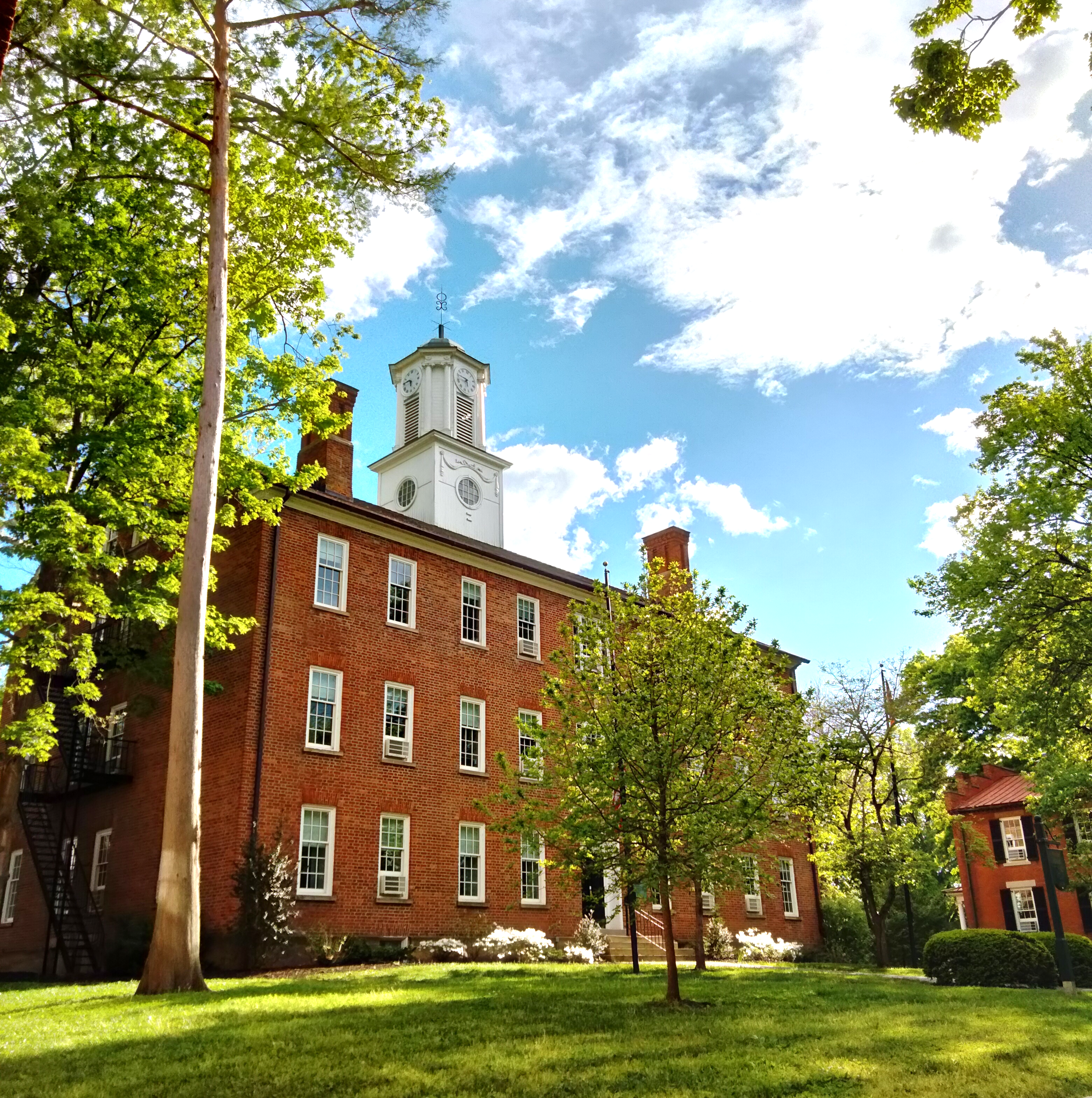
Cutler Hall

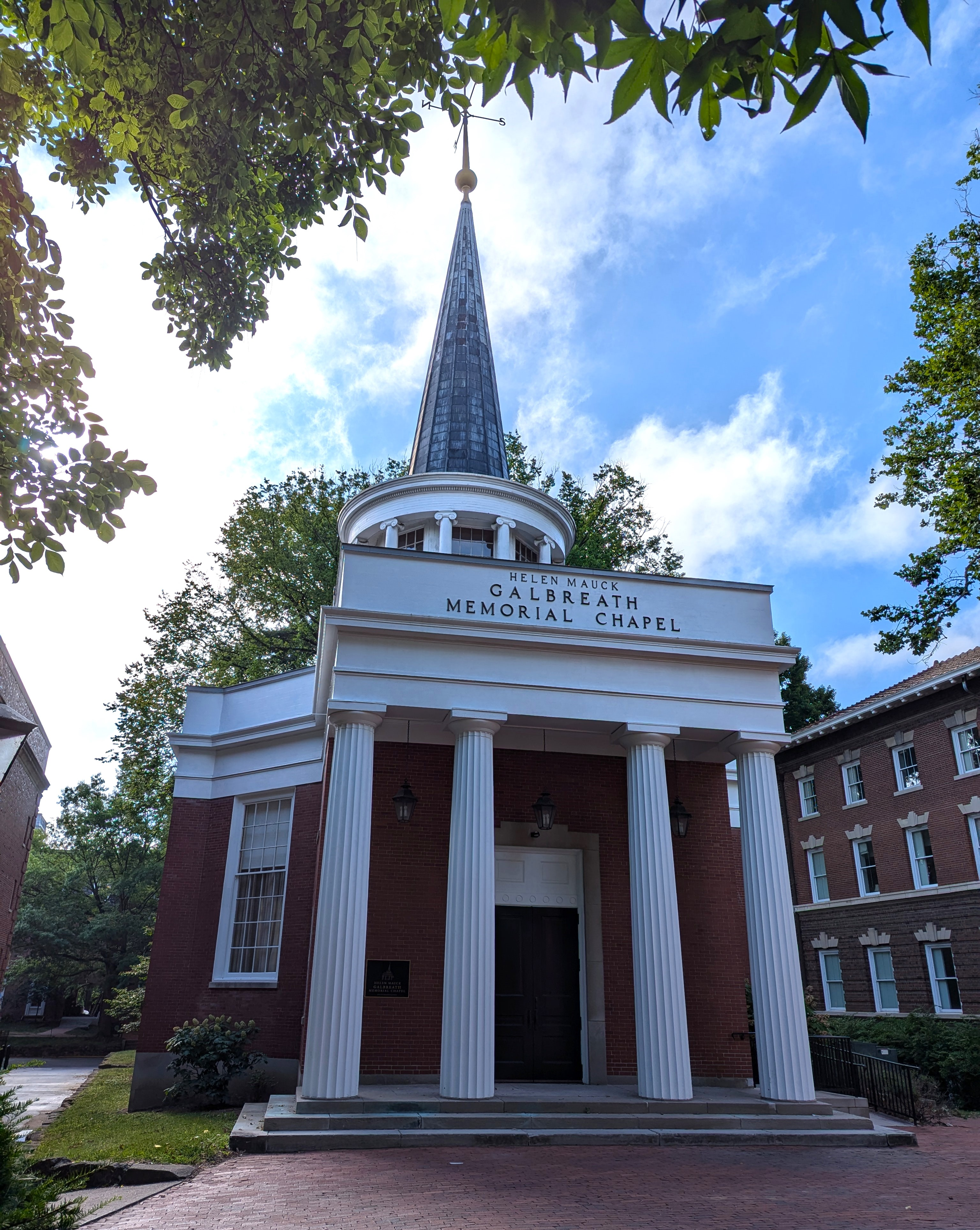
Galbreath Chapel

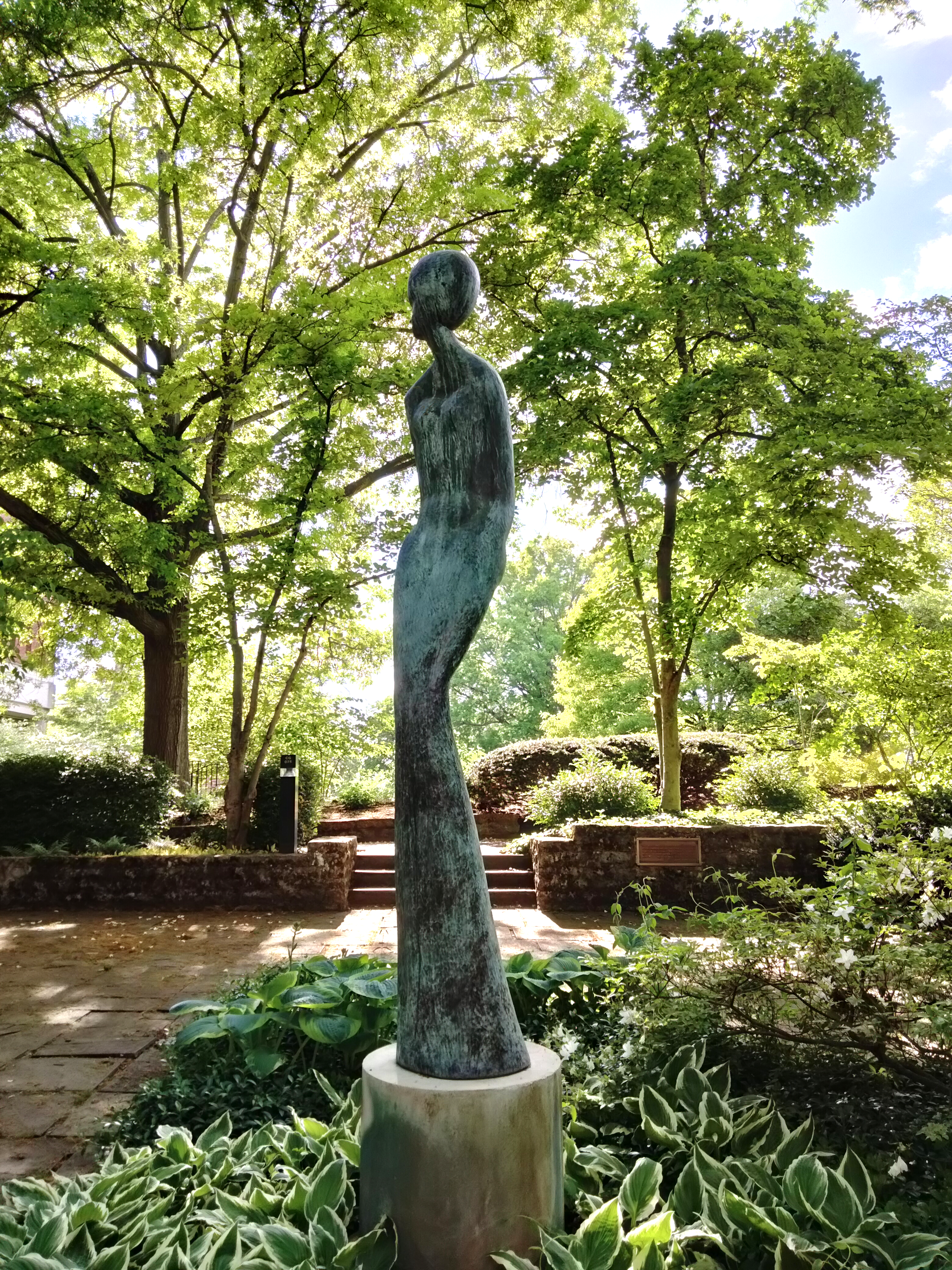
Green Lady

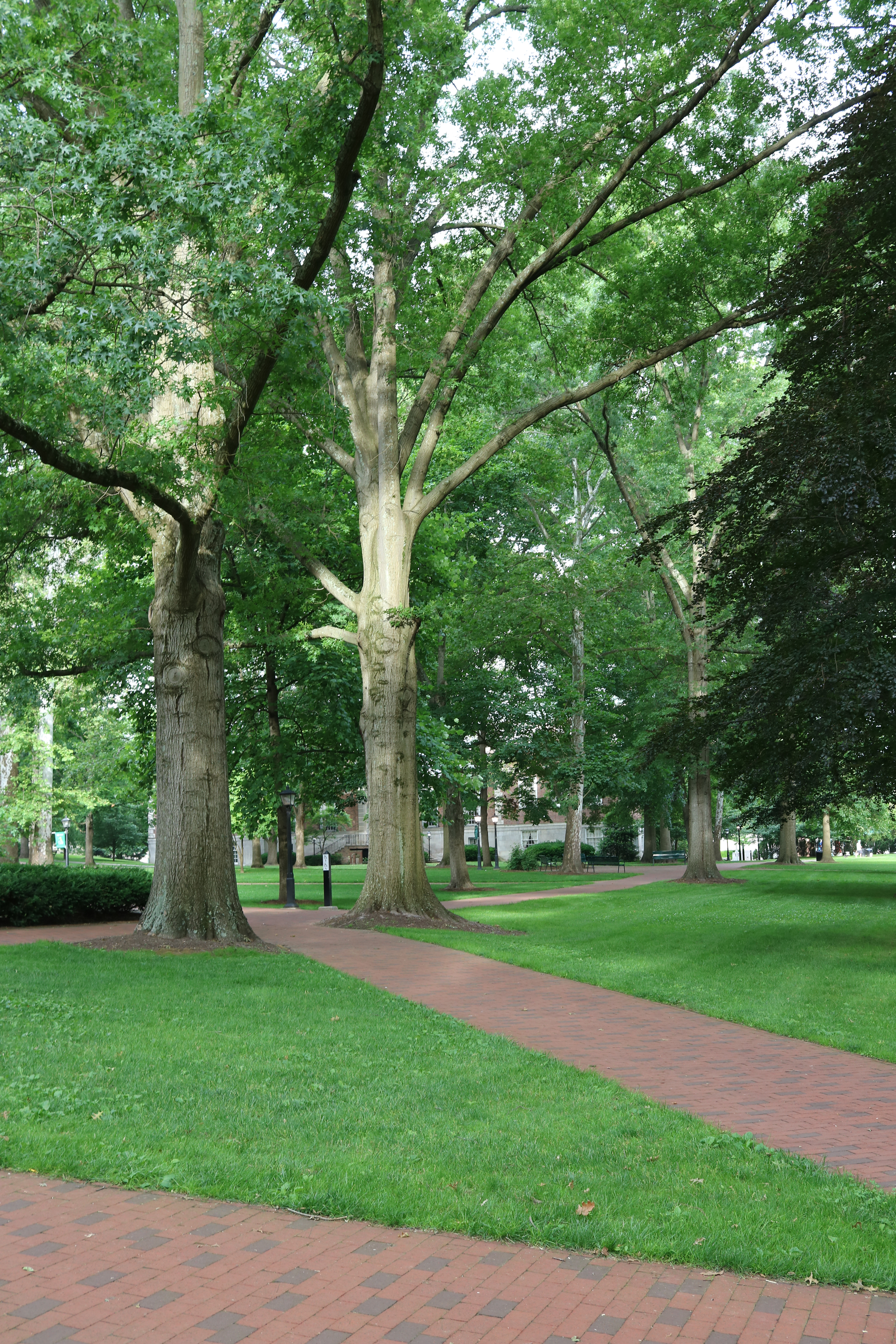
Trees

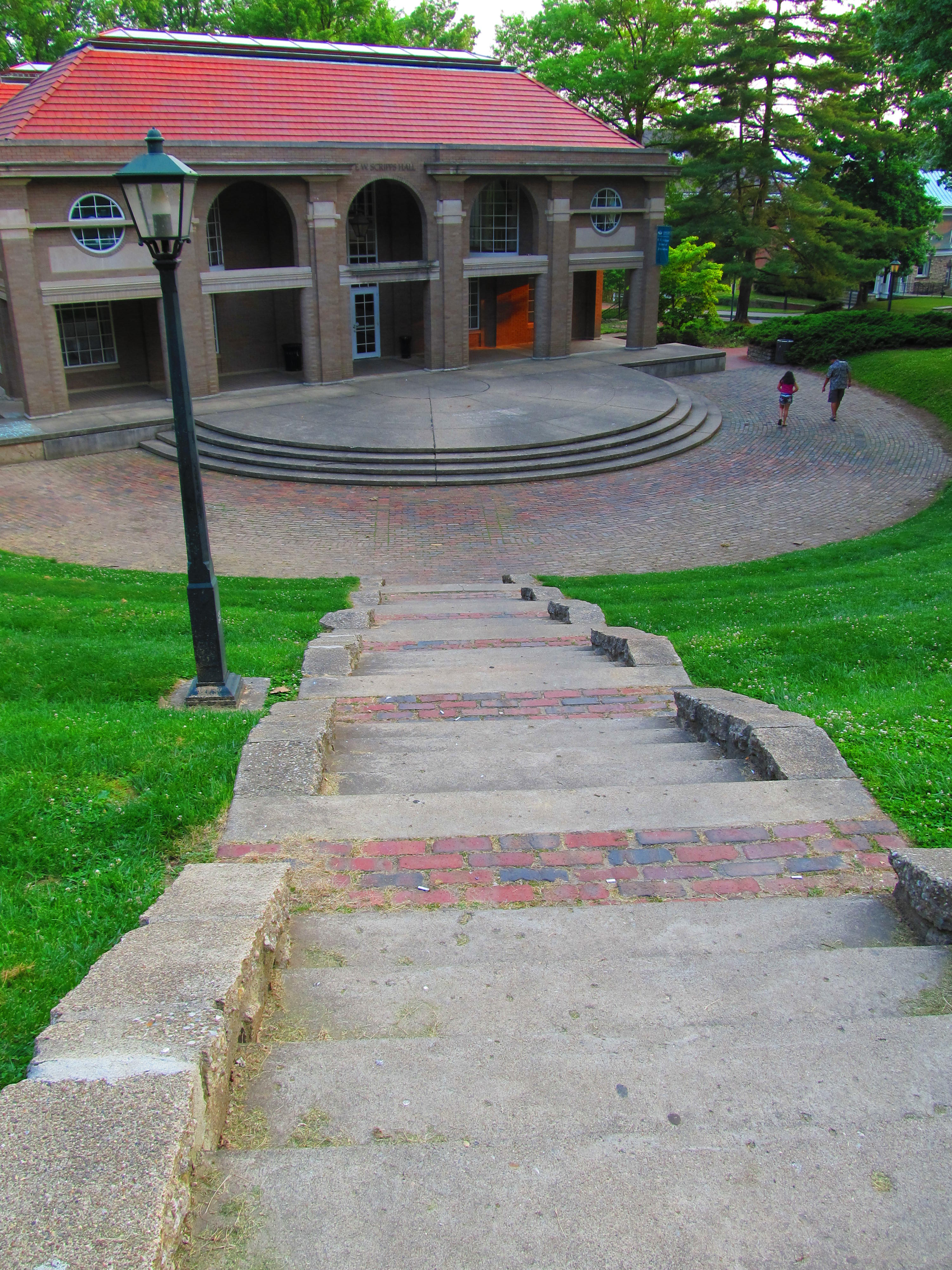
The Amphitheater

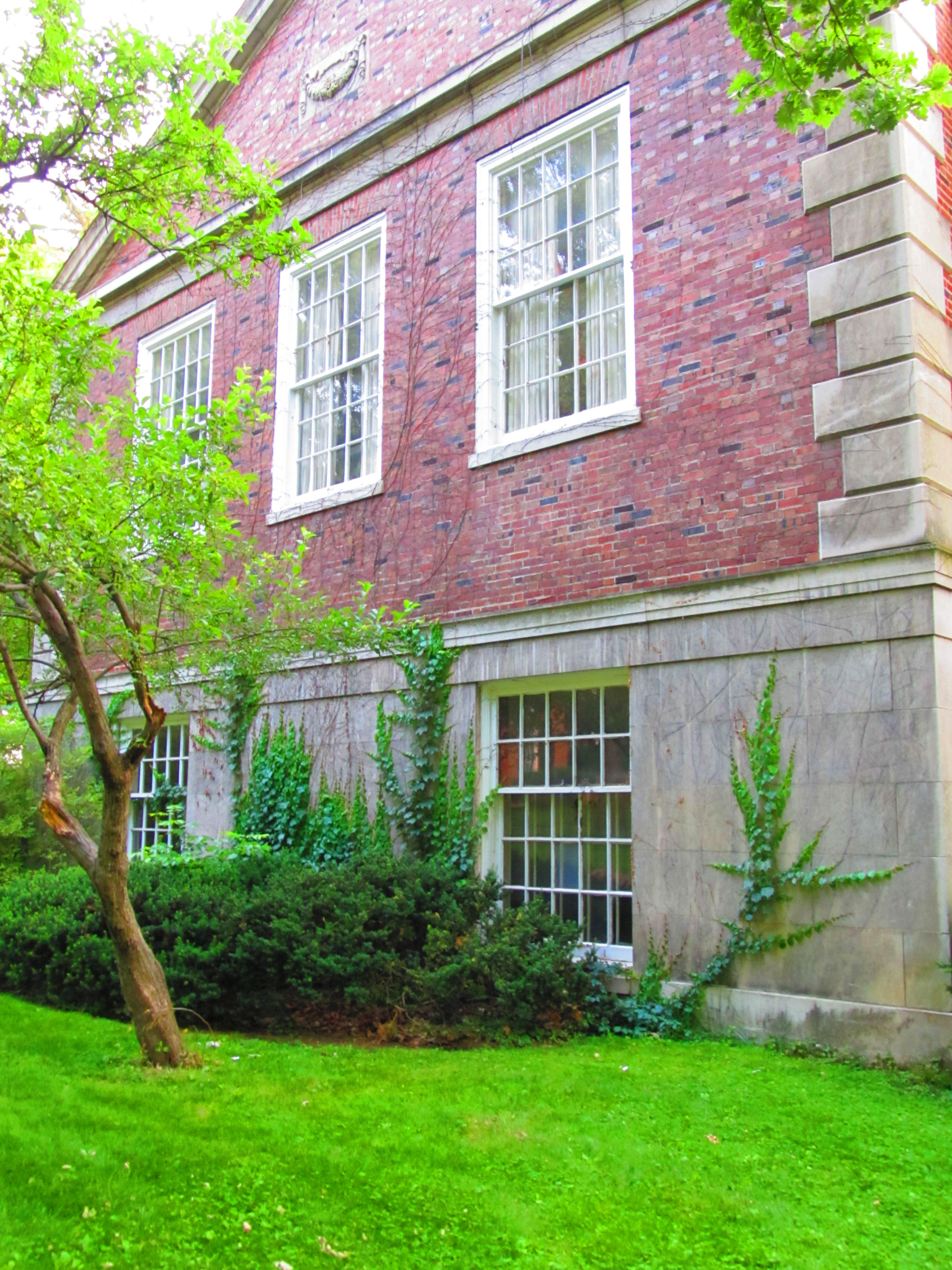
Chubb Hall

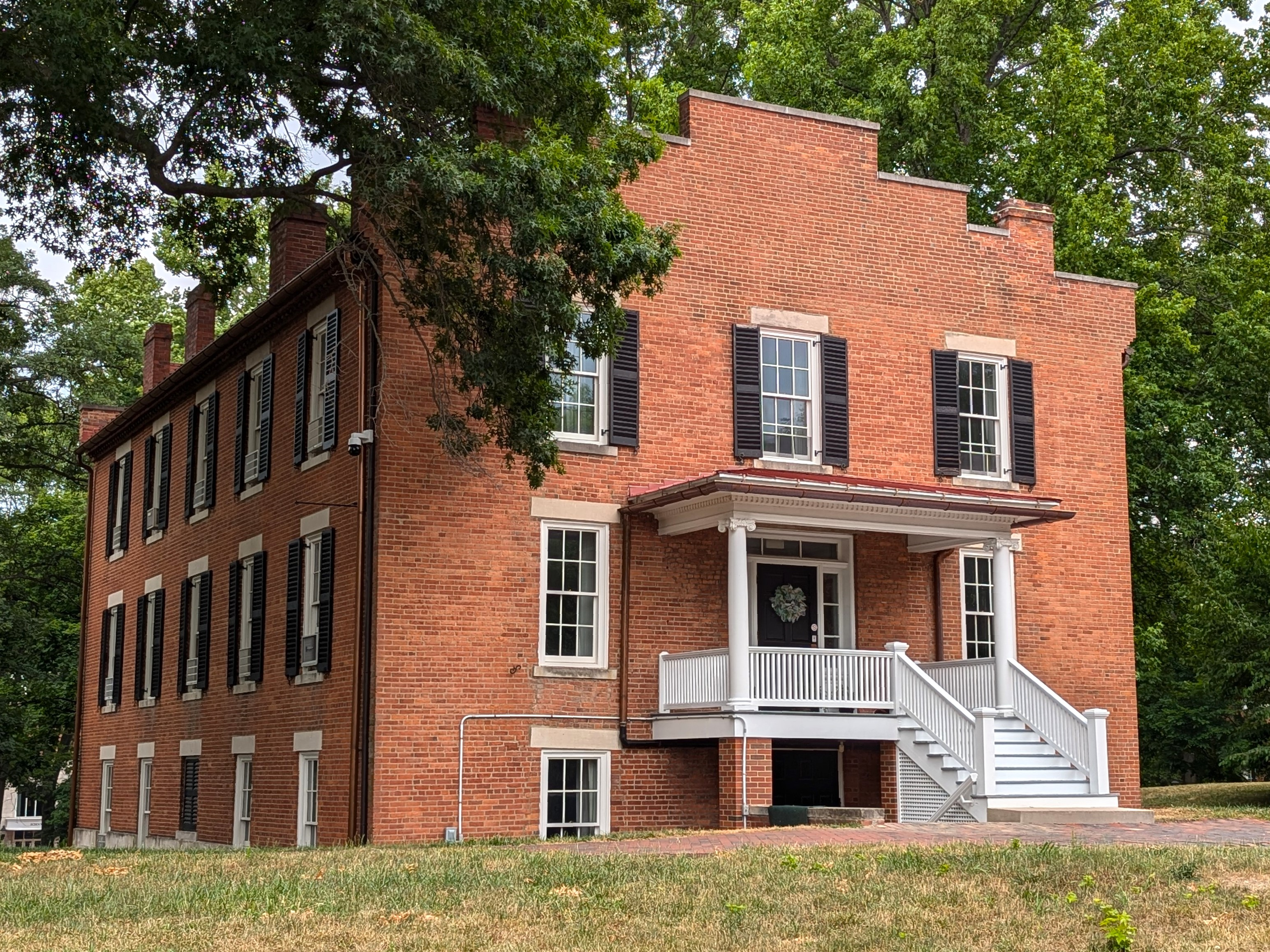
McGuffey Hall

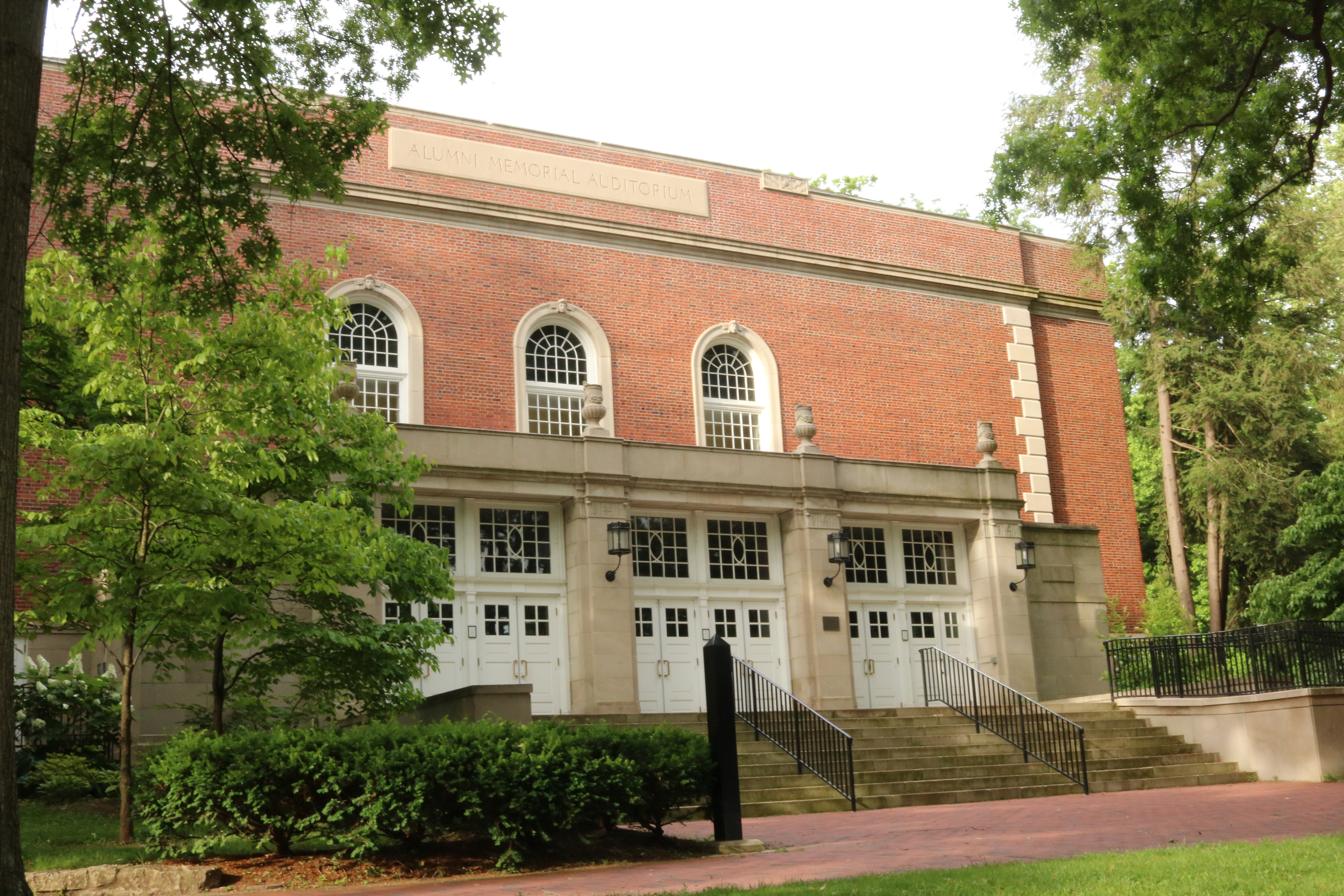
Memorial Auditorium

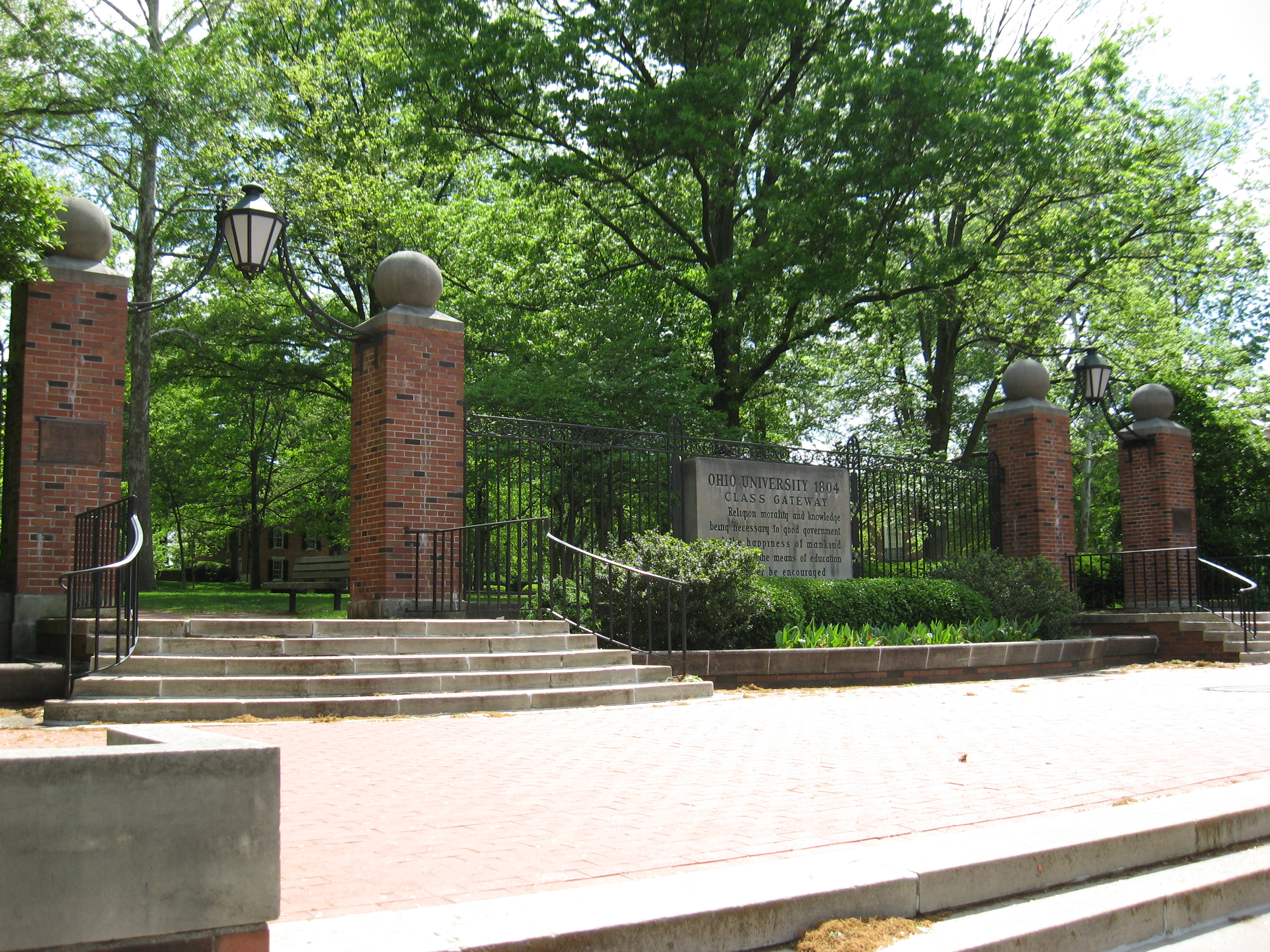
College Gates

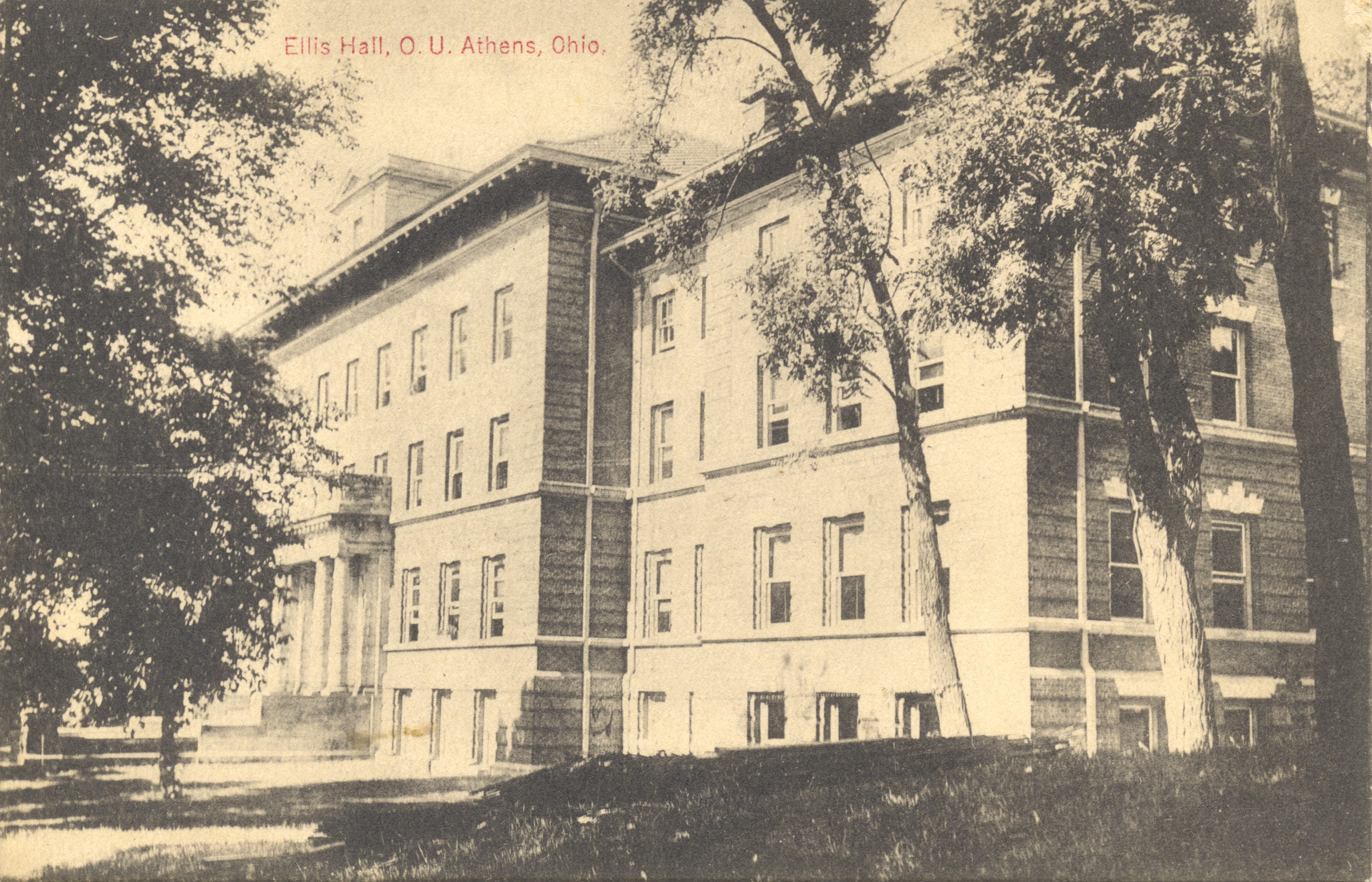
Ellis Hall

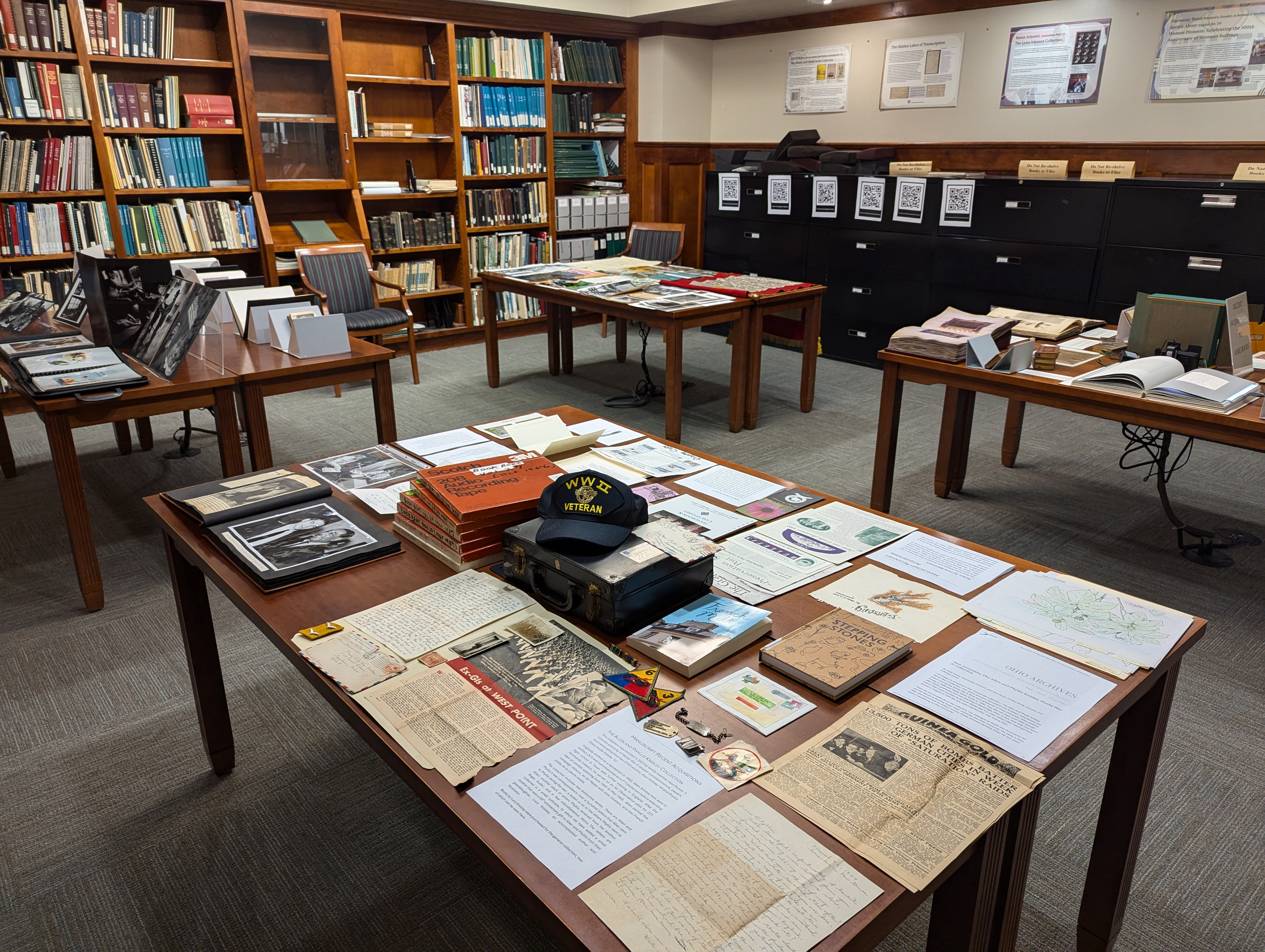
Alden Archives

Notable visitors to the Athens campus are memorialized with plaques along the western side of Memorial Auditorium: Marian Anderson (1960), Margaret Mead (1963), William Howard Taft (1908), William Jennings Bryan (1915), Herbert Hoover (1932), Jimmy Carter (1989), Robert Frost (1938), Eleanor Roosevelt (1954), John F. Kennedy (1963), Martin Luther King Jr. (1959), Arnold J. Toynbee (1963), John Glenn (1964), Robert McNamara (1965), Dwight Eisenhower (1965), Lyndon Johnson (1964), William O. Douglas (1963), Dean Rusk (1966), Ralph Bunche (1959), Dag Hammarskjold (1961), Tom C. Clark (1967), Robert A. Taft (1950), Carl Sandburg (1935), James William Fulbright (1985), Warren Harding (1916), Theodore Roosevelt (1912), Susan B. Anthony (1878), William McKinley (1891), Pearl S. Buck (1966), and Cesar Chavez (1974).

== See also ==
- National Register of Historic Places listings in Athens County, Ohio
- History of Ohio University
- History of Ohio
