= OhioHealth O'Bleness Hospital =

Medical establishment in Ohio

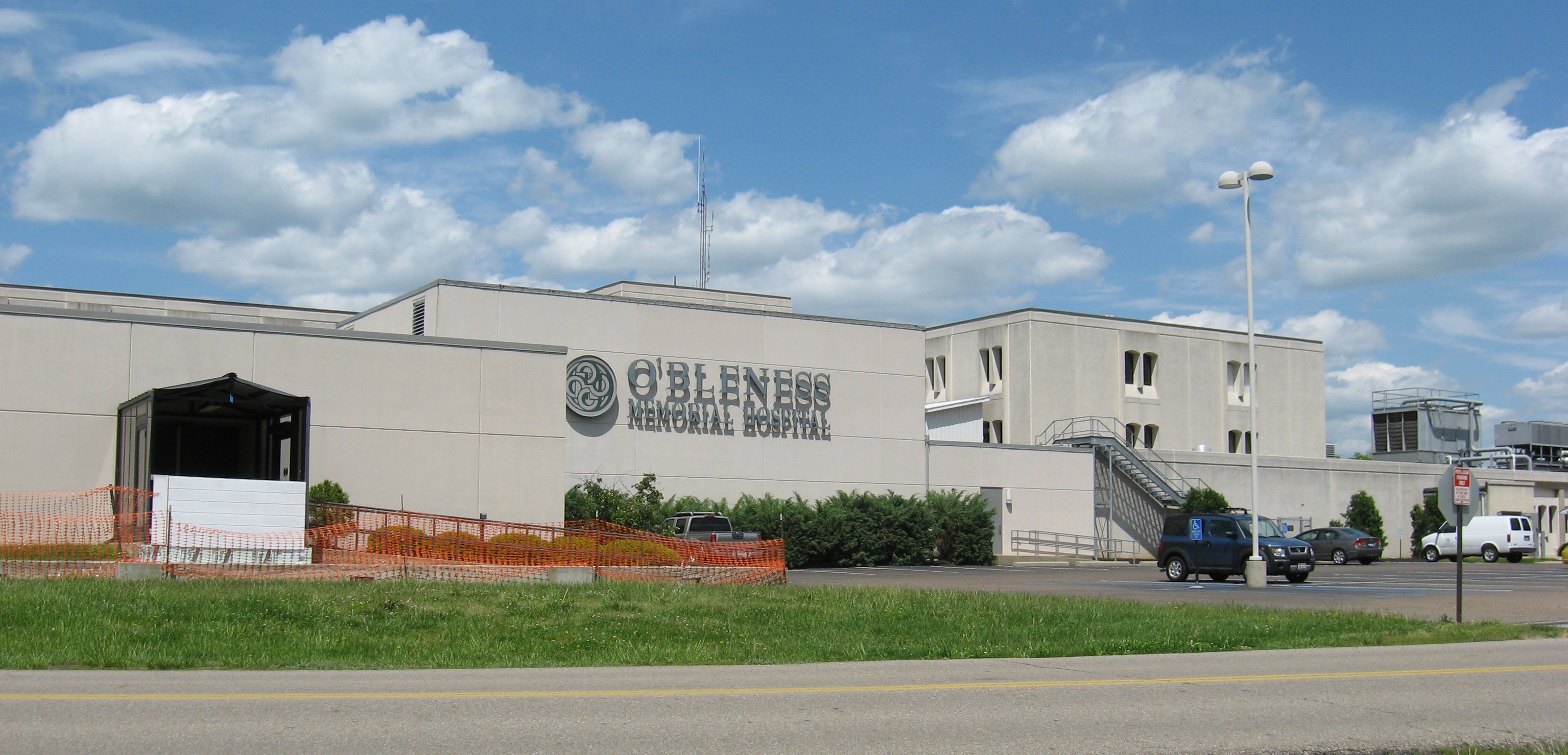
- O'Bleness Memorial Hospital

Geography
- Location: 55 Hospital Drive, Athens, Ohio, United States
- Coordinates: 39.3279°N 82.1156°W

Organization
- Type: General

Services
- Emergency department: Yes, 24-hour
- Beds: 144

Helipads
- Helipad: FAA LID: OH23

History
- Former name: Sheltering Arms Hospital
- Opened: 1921

Links
- Website: Official website
- Lists: Hospitals in Ohio

OhioHealth O'Bleness Hospital is a 144-bed community hospital at 55 Hospital Drive, Athens, Ohio 45701. O'Bleness overlooks the Hocking River. The westernmost wing of the hospital is known as the Cornwell Center, which houses medical offices; a separate office building slightly northwest of this was recently built, and is known as the Castrop Center. The Hopewell Health Center (formerly Tri-County Mental Health Services) complex is also next door to the west.

The current President and CEO of OhioHealth O'Bleness Hospital is LeeAnn Helber.

== History ==
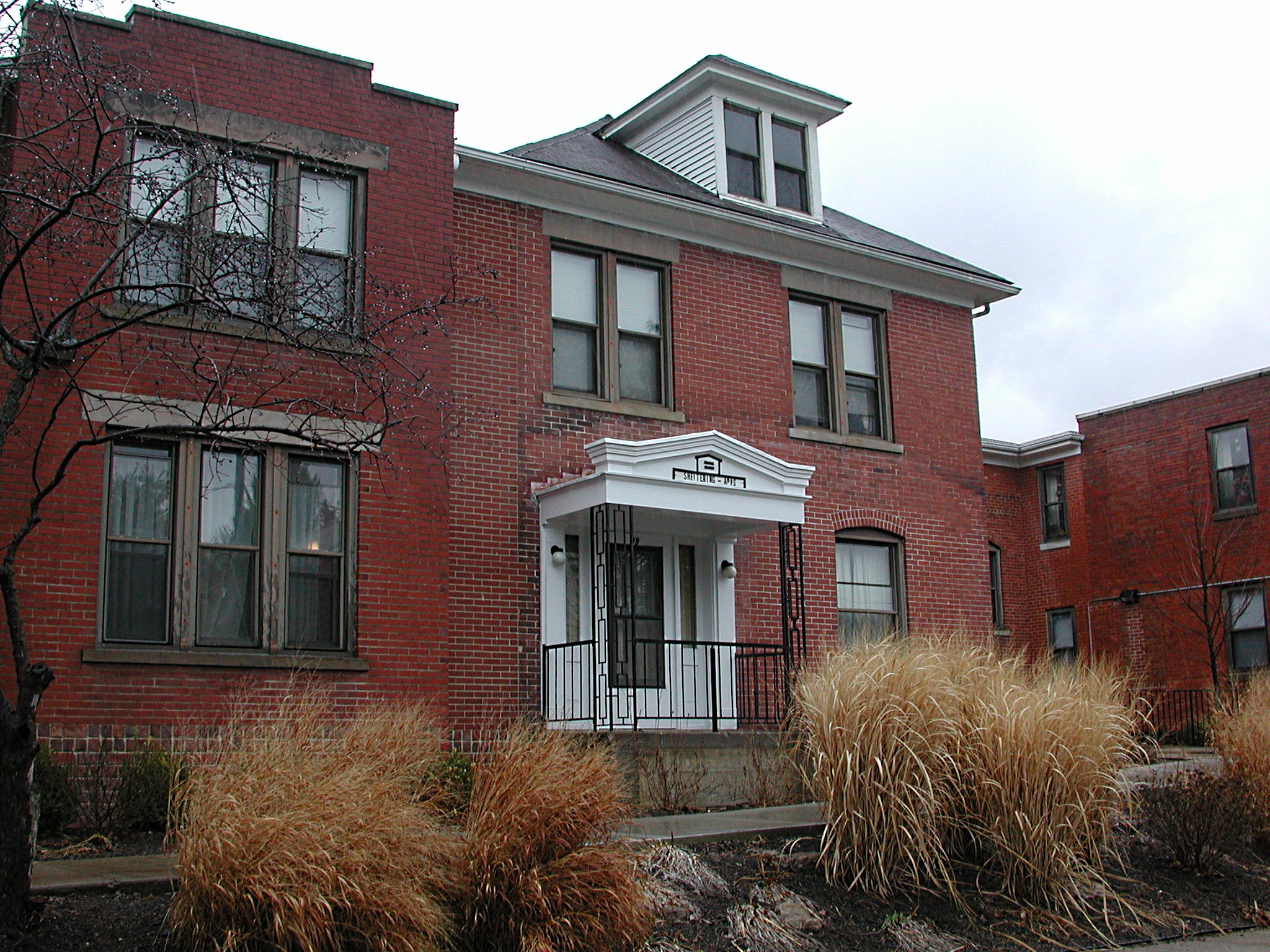
Sheltering Arms

The predecessor to O'Bleness was the nearby Sheltering Arms Hospital, which has been placed on the National Register. Sheltering Arms began as a birthing center in a private house at 19 Clark Street. A neighboring house was then purchased, and the two were connected and additional areas were added. O'Bleness Hospital was established in 1921.

In January 2014 OhioHealth (Columbus, OH) took over control of O'Bleness Hospital. As such, O'Bleness Memorial Hospital has changed their name to OhioHealth O'Bleness Hospital to reflect the acquisition. Between 2019 and 2021, a new state-of-the-art ICU opened and there was an expansion and renovation of the ER with numerous equipment and facilities upgrades. In early 2021 there was further expansion with the construction of a new two story, 40,000 square foot Medical Office building.
