= Athens Governmental Buildings =

Local government building in the United States

- U.S. National Register of Historic Places
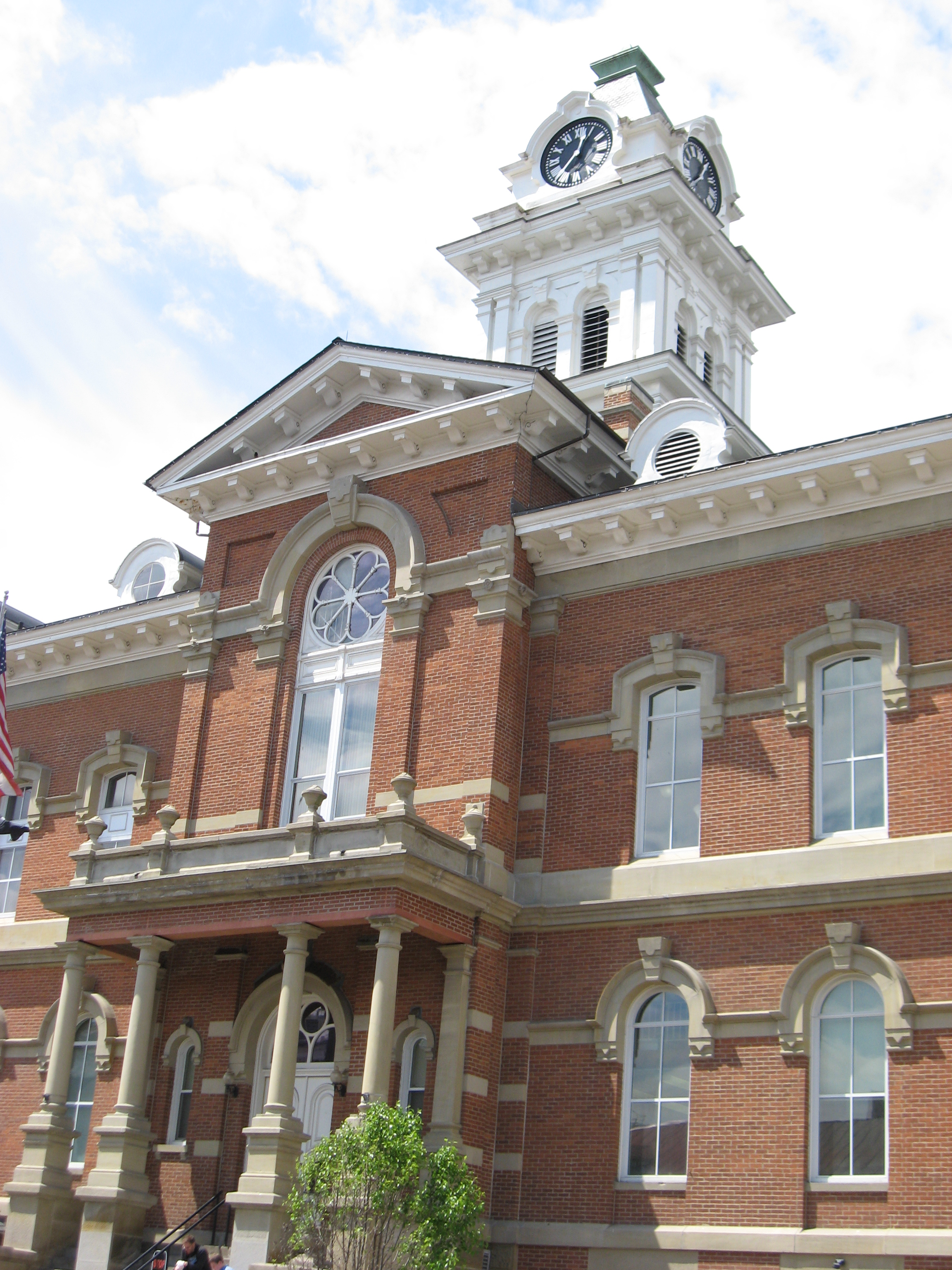
- Athens County Courthouse, one of the Governmental Buildings

- Location within Ohio Location within the United States
- Location: E. State, E. Washington, Court, and W. Union Sts, Athens, Ohio
- Coordinates: 39°19′35″N 82°6′2″W
- Area: 3.9 acres (1.6 ha)
- Built: 1804
- Architect: James Knox Taylor; John G. Unkefer and Company
- Architectural style: Italian Villa, Romanesque and Classical Revival
- NRHP reference No.: 79001782
- Added to NRHP: November 29, 1979

The Athens Governmental Buildings are a complex of buildings in central Athens, Ohio, United States. Among these buildings are the Athens County Courthouse, the Athens City Hall, and the former post office, now Haning Hall of Ohio University. The current post office is a much more recent building away from the town center, on East Stimson Avenue. Together, they were added to the National Register of Historic Places in 1979.

The oldest of the buildings included, the Silas Bingham House, also known as the old log courthouse, was built in 1804. The Athens County Courthouse was built during 1877–80. The Athens City Hall, built in the 1800s, was one of few city halls that old in southern Ohio which were still in use in 1999. Haning Hall is a former post office.

== The Silas Bingham House ==
The Bingham house is the oldest house in Athens and is an excellent example of an early two-story log building. Silas Bingham was an early figure in Athens history, arriving in Athens in 1797 after serving in the Revolutionary War and becoming the first sheriff of Athens County. Bingham was paid $4 on June 11, 1806 for use of a room for court related meetings and in October 1806 was paid $12 to furnish a room that could be used for court for a year. The Bingham house has many ties to Ohio University. It was also the residence of Robert G. Wilson (Ohio University's third president) from 1824 to 1839 and John Newton Templeton (the first Black graduate of Ohio University) in 1928.

The house was originally built on South College Street but was moved to 118 East State Street in 1853. Today the house is located at 97 Richland Ave, at the intersection of Richland Ave, South Shafer Street, and South Green Drive. The building was bought by Ohio University in 1987, the same year it was added to the National Register of Historic Places. It was used for a time as the University Visitor Center and today houses the University's Office of Sustainability. The building is open to visitors. The first floor is decorated like a 19th century home with furniture and decorations made in the early 1800s.

== Gallery ==
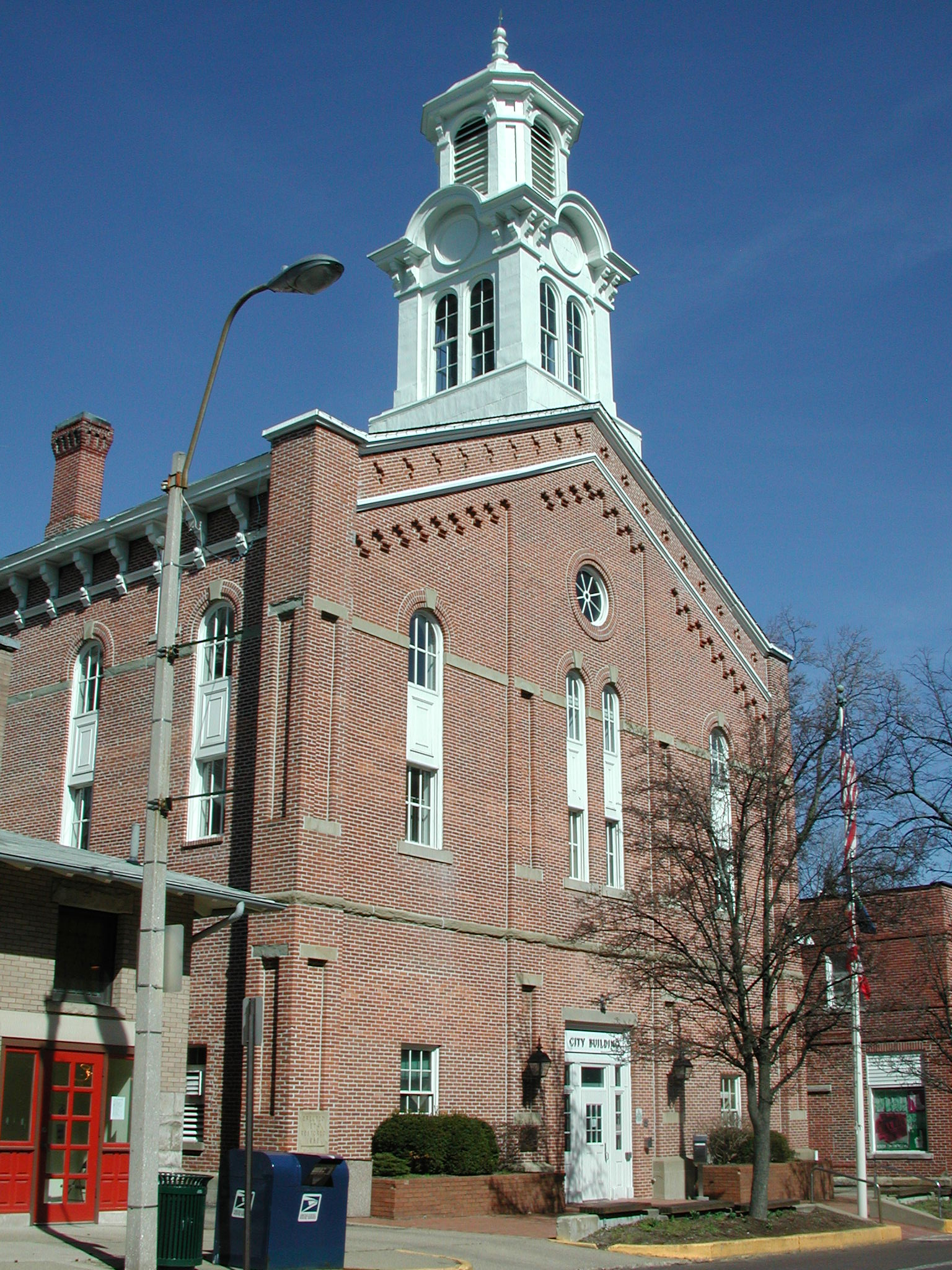
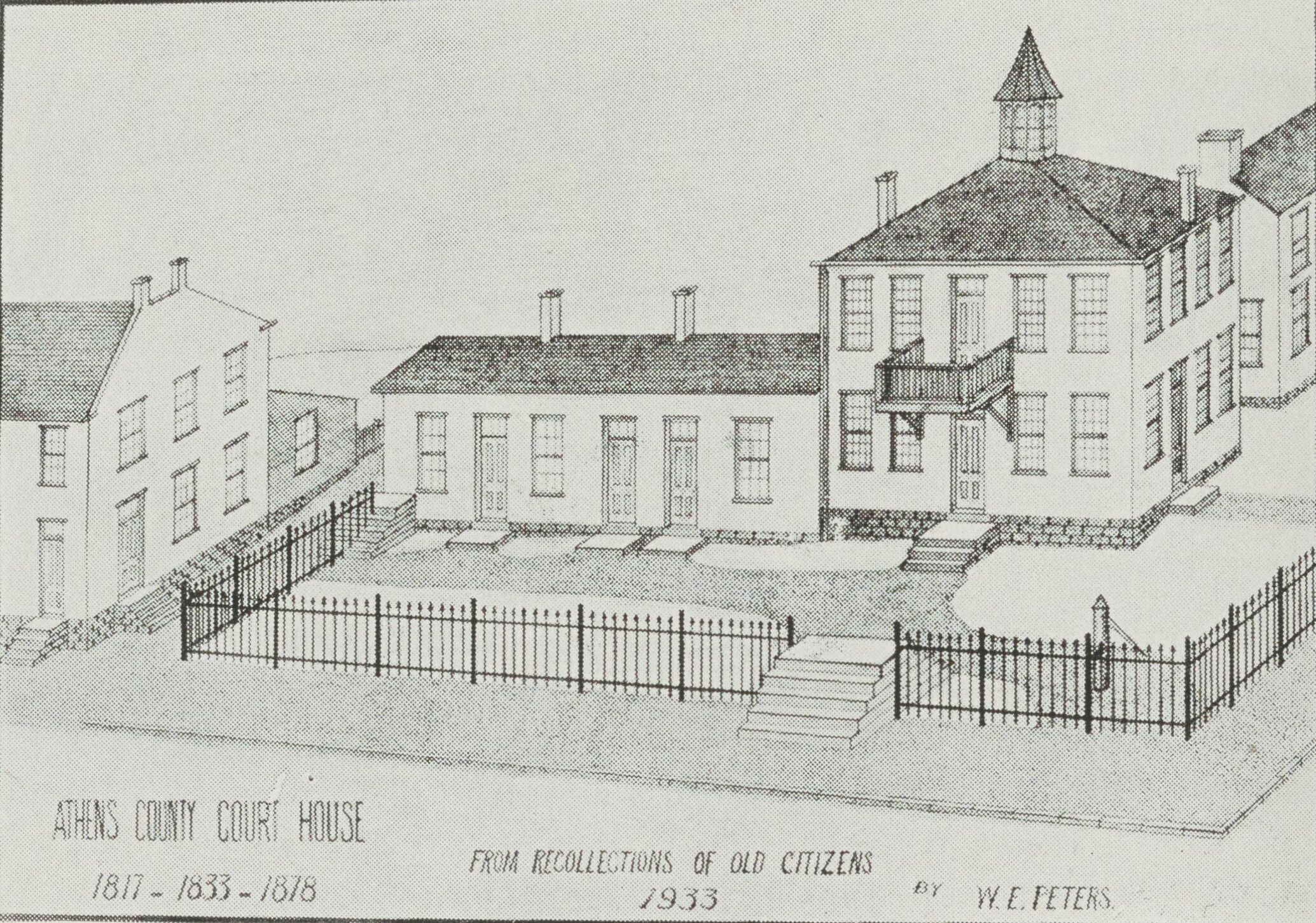

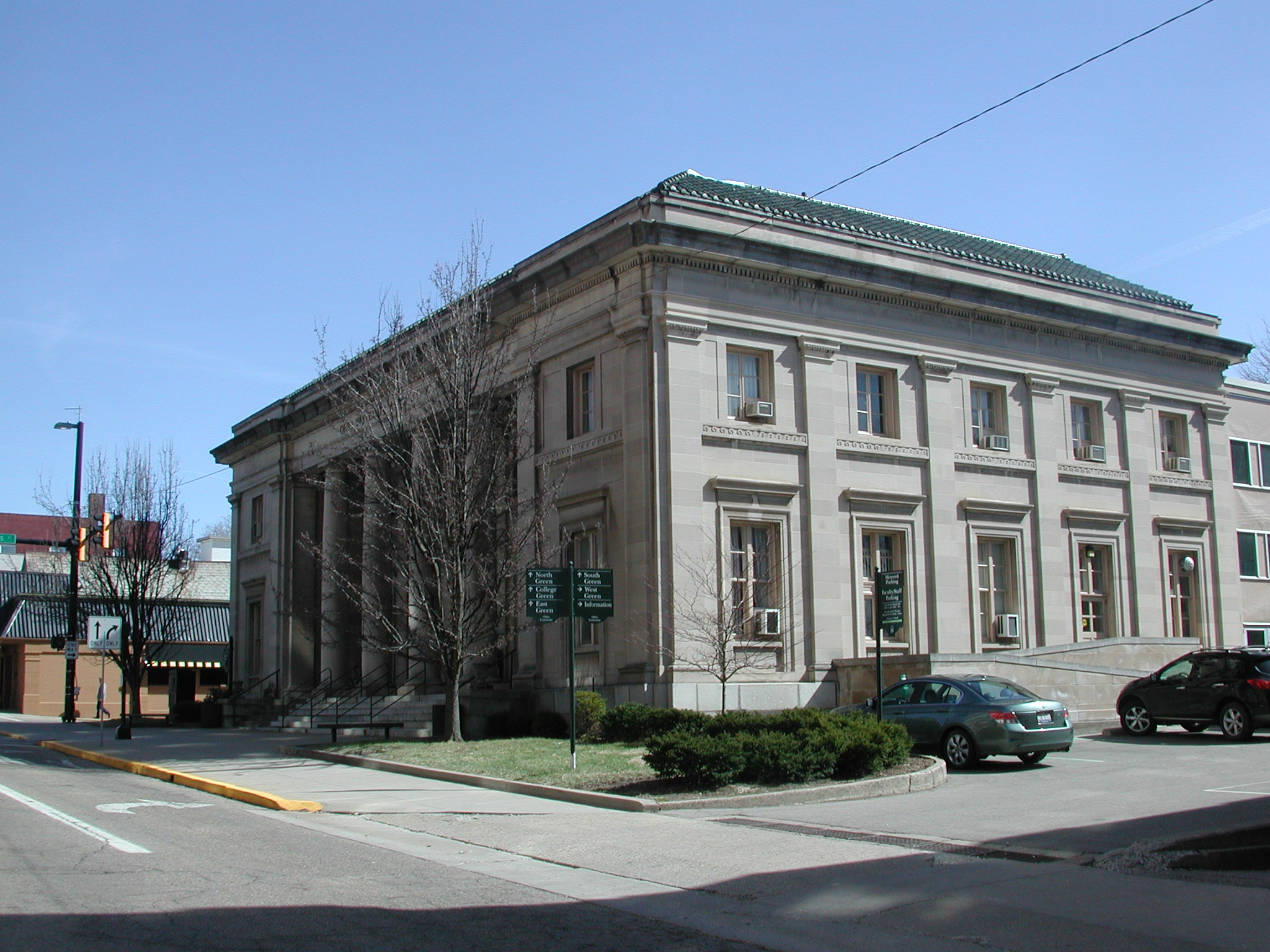
Former Athens Post Office
