= David Hostetler =

American sculptor

David L. Hostetler (December 27, 1926 – November 18, 2015) was a wood carver and bronze sculptor of works capturing the female form. He was also a professor emeritus of Ohio University.

== Biography ==
=== Early life ===
Born in Beach City, Ohio, on December 27, 1926, Hostetler had a close relationship with his Amish grandfather, an influence which stayed with him throughout his career. His interest in art came by accident: during World War II, while studying as an engineer in the US Army, he suffered a shrapnel wound in the leg during a training exercise in California. While recuperating for six months, he became interested in art after receiving drawing materials from a Red Cross volunteer. He received his art degree from Indiana University Bloomington in 1948 and in 1949 was awarded a Master's of Fine Arts from Ohio University, where he taught for 38 years.

=== Career ===
His art career spanned more than 60 years, progressing from Folk art images to stylized forms and including guest teaching and lecturing throughout the United States and Mexico. Hostetler retired as a full professor of sculpture from Ohio University in 1985 where he was named Professor Emeritus. Some of his students who have gone on to fame include Jim Dine, whose work has been collected and exhibited internationally since 1960; David True, an artist who has exhibited at the Whitney Biennial and who now teaches at Columbia University; Harvey Breverman, a well-known painter and printmaker; Glenn Randall, a leader in the field of English antiques; and Dianne Perry Vanderlip, a curator of contemporary art at the Denver Art Museum.

In addition to the art and academic worlds, he explored farming, worked as a salesman, trained as an engineer and was founding an art museum, drumming in a jazz band and collecting Americana.

=== Later life ===
Hostetler and his wife, Susan Crehan-Hostetler, lived on a 40-acre (160,000 m^{2}) farm outside Athens, Ohio during the winter months and in Nantucket, Massachusetts, during the summer, where they own the Hostetler Gallery and where he played drums in his own jazz band.

His longtime appreciation of the great Jewish philosophers inspired his interest in the Jewish faith, philosophy and way of life, and at the age of 69, Hostetler began studying to convert to Judaism.

Hostetler died from complications of emergency gallbladder surgery on November 18, 2015.

== Sculpture ==
=== Materials ===
Hostetler earned wide acclaim for his unique treatment of the feminine form. Most of his pieces begin as wood carvings, with bronze versions cast directly from the wood. In the 1960s, he gained national prominence with his American Woman Series - graceful, flowing wood sculptures. He initiated the series using indigenous hardwoods (elm, white oak, walnut, maple), then progressed from folk images to stylized symbols in exotic woods (purpleheart, ziricote and pink ivory). The photographer Yousuf Karsh created a portrait of Hostetler surrounded by his "women". His artwork has been featured in films, on television and in newspapers and magazines.

At age 78, Hostetler embarked on a new direction in his woodcarving that is inspired by the Anasazi American Indians of the southwest. Painting combined with sculptures are another avenue he was exploring.

== Notable works ==
The Sheffield, at 322 West 57th Street, New York City commissioned The IKON, a 13 foot tall white bronze. It is sited in a pocket park in front of the entrance to the building. It was dedicated in 2012.

Hostetler's 13-foot piece, The Duo, is in a pocket park at Trump International Hotel & Tower in New York City. Commissioned by Philip Johnson, Donald Trump and Lizanne Galbreath, the rough-textured bronze depicts two slender figures, seemingly growing out of trees and touching at the arms. It honors the late Ohio real estate developer and philanthropist Dan Galbreath, Lizanne's father, and Trump's partner in the hotel and tower. Galbreath was a Hostetler collector.

His works appear in more than 25 museums and galleries, including the Museum of Fine Arts in Boston, the Milwaukee Museum, and the Butler Institute of American Art in Youngstown, Ohio, as well as public collections in New Mexico and the Netherlands.

Grounds for Sculpture commissioned Summertime Lady, an eleven-foot bronze, for the front of the museum that marks the entrance to the sculpture park. The painted and polished bronze figure with Ferrari red dress and BMW black hair. Summertime Lady is an example of the painted bronzes Hostetler has created using the high-quality car paint, glazurit.

=== Selected public locations ===
- Trump International Hotel and Tower, Manhattan, New York
- Boston Museum of Fine Arts, Boston, Massachusetts
- Kennedy Library, Boston, Massachusetts
- Butler Institute of American Art, Ohio
- Columbus Museum of Art, Columbus, Ohio
- Milwaukee Art Museum, Milwaukee, Wisconsin
- Speed Museum, Louisville, Kentucky
- Montgomery Museum of Fine Arts, Alabama

=== Related publications ===
- David Hostetler, the Carver from Coolville Ridge Adams, Phillip D. (1967) Western Michigan University School of Graduate Studies
- Hostetler the Carver, Ohio University Press
- Masters of Wood Carving, Watson-Guptill
- American Craftsmen, National Geographic Society
- Contemporary Art with Wood, Crown Publishers
