= Sheltering Arms Hospital (Athens, Ohio) =

- U.S. National Register of Historic Places
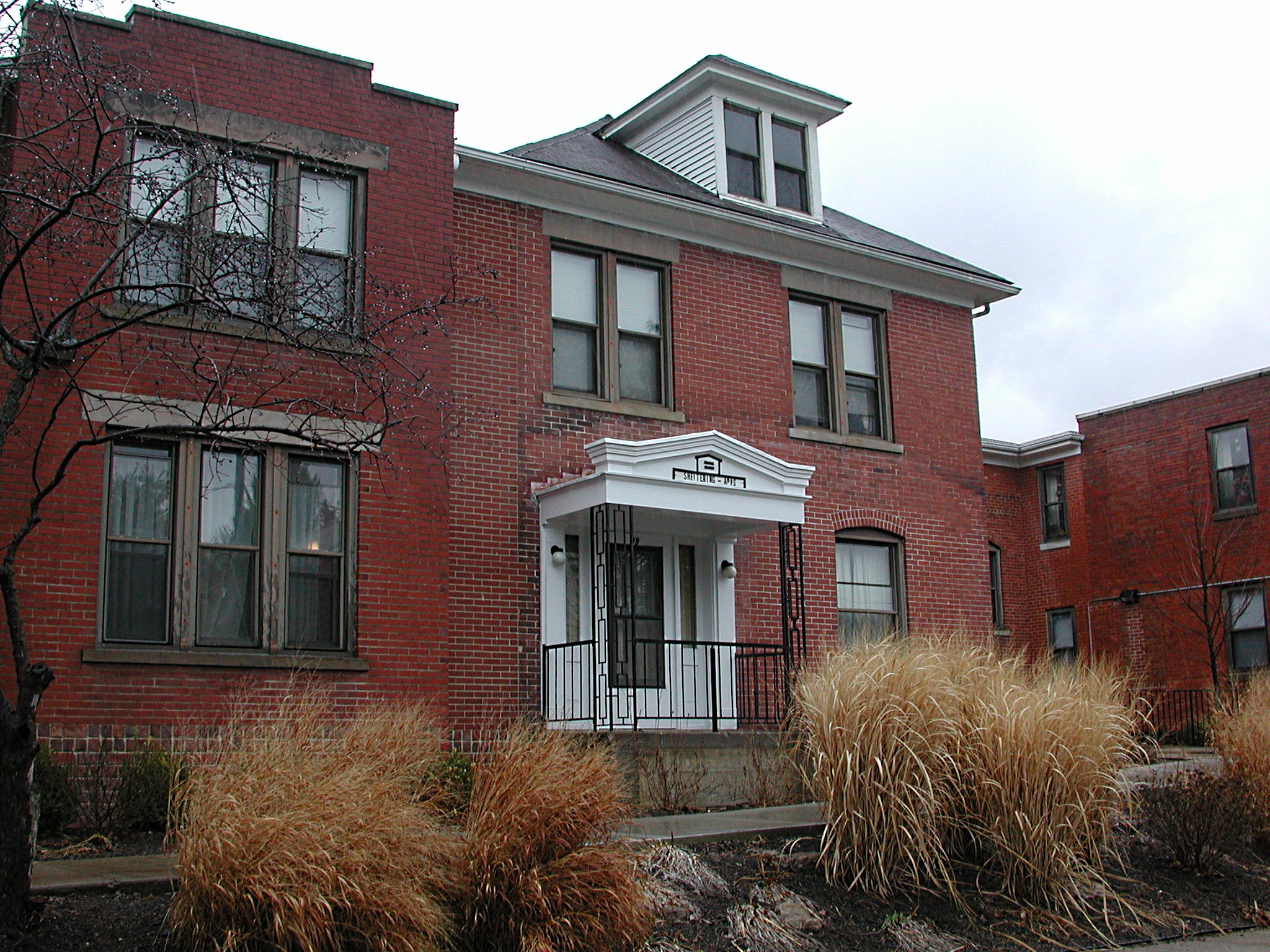
- Sheltering Arms

- Location within Ohio Location within the United States
- Location: 19 Clarke St., Athens, Ohio
- Coordinates: 39°20′8″N 82°6′43″W
- Area: less than one acre
- Built: 1911
- Built by: Charles A. Breining
- NRHP reference No.: 82003542
- Added to NRHP: June 25, 1982

The Sheltering Arms Hospital, located in Athens, Ohio, started as a two-room home-based maternity ward in 1921 and grew into a medical and surgical facility as the original facility was expanded. In operation at 19 Clarke Street from 1921 until 1970, Sheltering Arms moved into a new facility in 1970 named the Charles G. O’Bleness Memorial Hospital, and was renamed the OhioHealth O’Bleness Hospital when it became part of OhioHealth (Columbus, OH) in 2014.

== History ==
In the early 1920s, Charles Breinig, a contractor, and his wife Delia used their home as a lying-in facility, where women gave birth and rested for several days. Encouraged by Dr. John E. Rollings Sprague, the Breinings built a four-room addition in 1921 and became the Sheltering Arms Hospital. It was one of the first such facilities in Athens County, Ohio and Sheltering Arms became a magnet for medical care in Athens.

The hospital continued to grow in size and services. Diagnostic x-ray imaging was added in 1924, and a clinical laboratory in 1937. The Breinings continued to expand and operate the facility until 1947 when they sold it to Dr. Theron H. Morgan. Morgan later donated the facility to the community through The Sheltering Arms Foundation, which was started in 1949. The Foundation became the sole owner of the facility in 1959, after Morgan's death in 1957.

Having outgrown the Clarke Street building, local doctors asked the community to build a new facility. Funds were raised, with $1 million of the eventual $1.7 million coming from Charles G. O'Bleness, a local banker. Groundbreaking for the new building, about a half mile away, was in December 1967. It opened in 1970, named the Charles G. O’Bleness Memorial Hospital, O'Bleness having died in 1969. The hospital is now known as the OhioHealth O’Bleness Hospital.

== Building ==
The original Sheltering Arms building is a two-story, irregular shaped brick structure built in 1911, with several additions through 1939. It was added to the National Register of Historic Places in 1982. The building now provides Senior/Disabled Low Income Subsidized Housing.
