= Athens County Infirmary =

- U.S. National Register of Historic Places
- U.S. Historic district
- Location within Ohio Location within the United States
- Nearest city: Chauncey, Ohio
- Coordinates: 39°24′00″N 82°7′43″W
- Area: 1,295 acres (5.24 km^{2})
- Architect: Charles Kircher and David W. Peoples
- Architectural style: Colonial Revival
- NRHP reference No.: 03000323
- Added to NRHP: 2003-05-01

The Athens County Infirmary is a registered historic district near Chauncey, Ohio, listed in the National Register on 2003-05-01. It contains five contributing buildings. The property is commonly known locally as the County Farm or the County Home. It currently houses the county's recycling center, dog shelter, and offices of Job & Family Services. There is also an historic cemetery on the property. The Burr Oak Water District recently has established a wellfield in the riparian zone, in deep unconsolidated sediments along the Hocking River for their primary water source, because their former water source, Burr Oak Lake, is polluted with unacceptable contaminants.

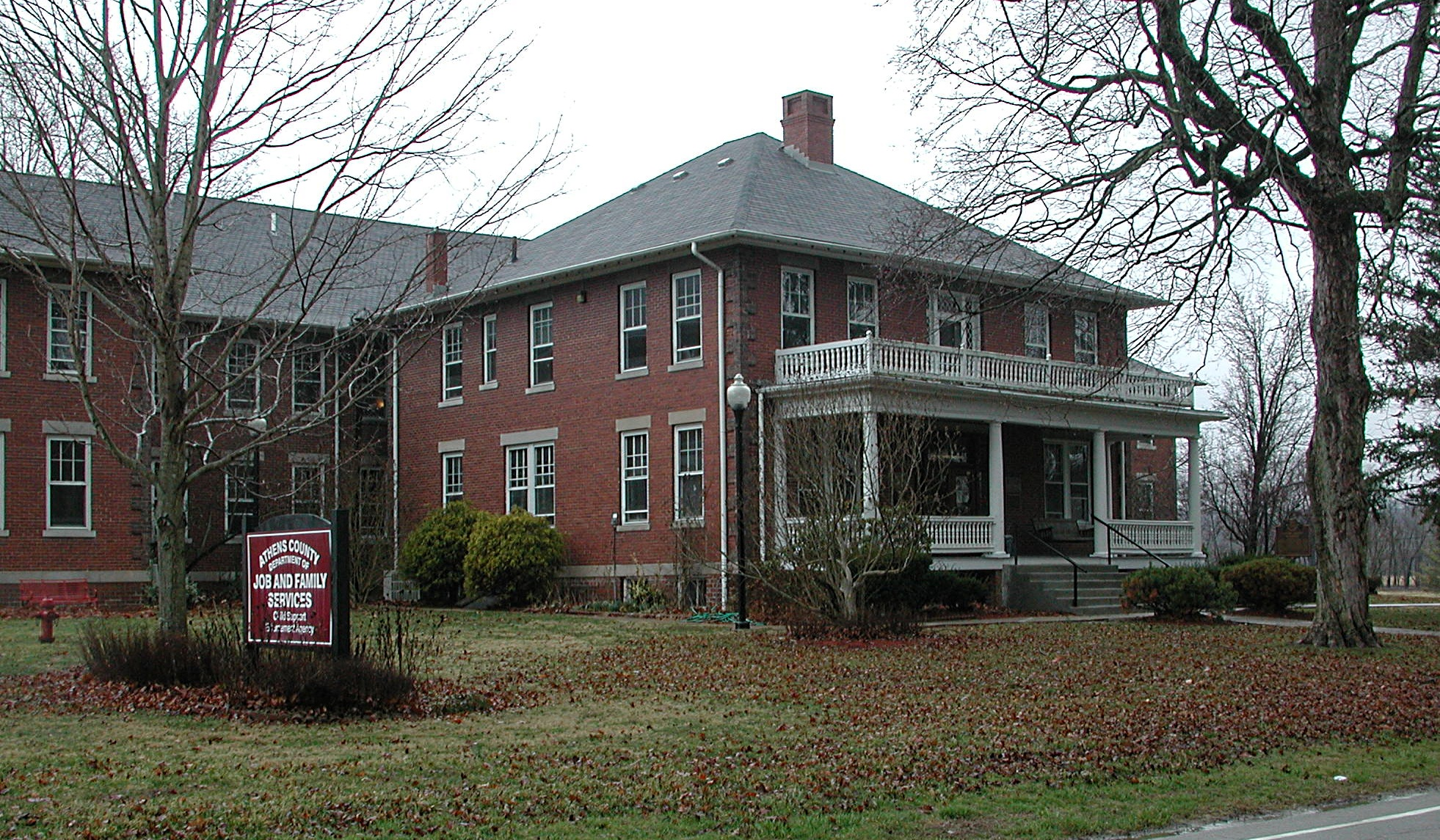
Main building

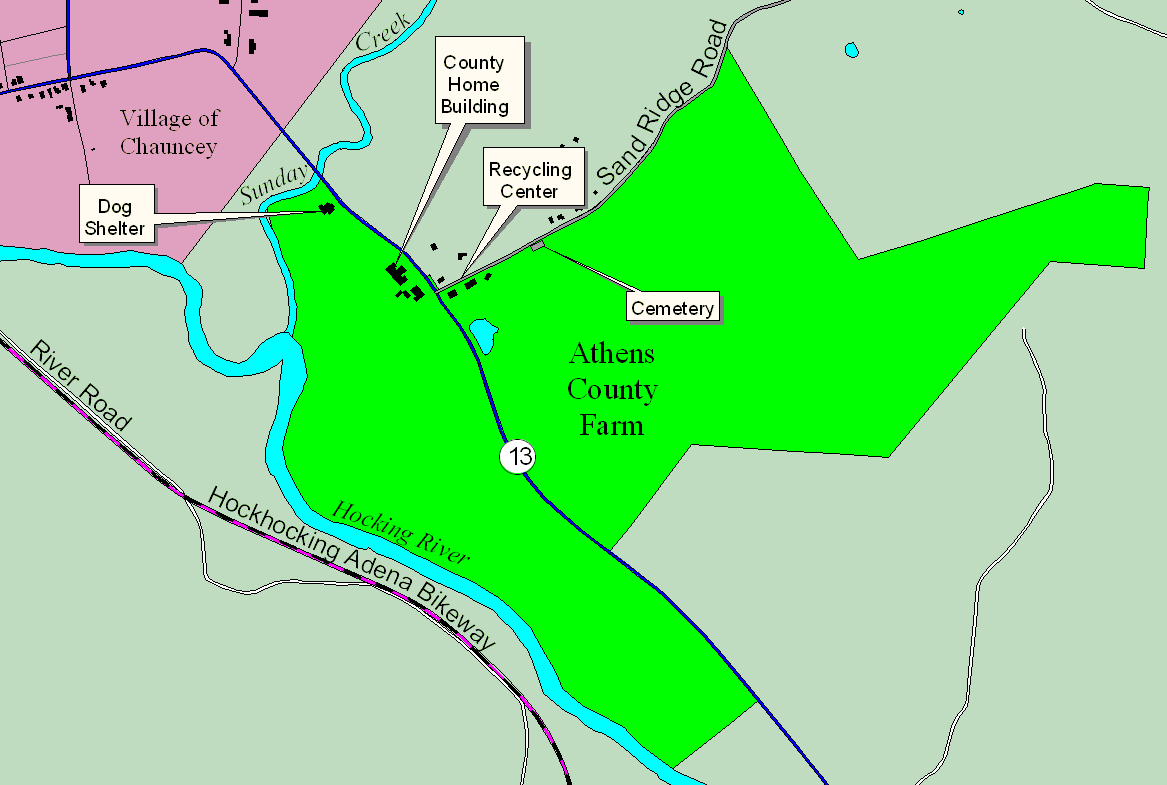

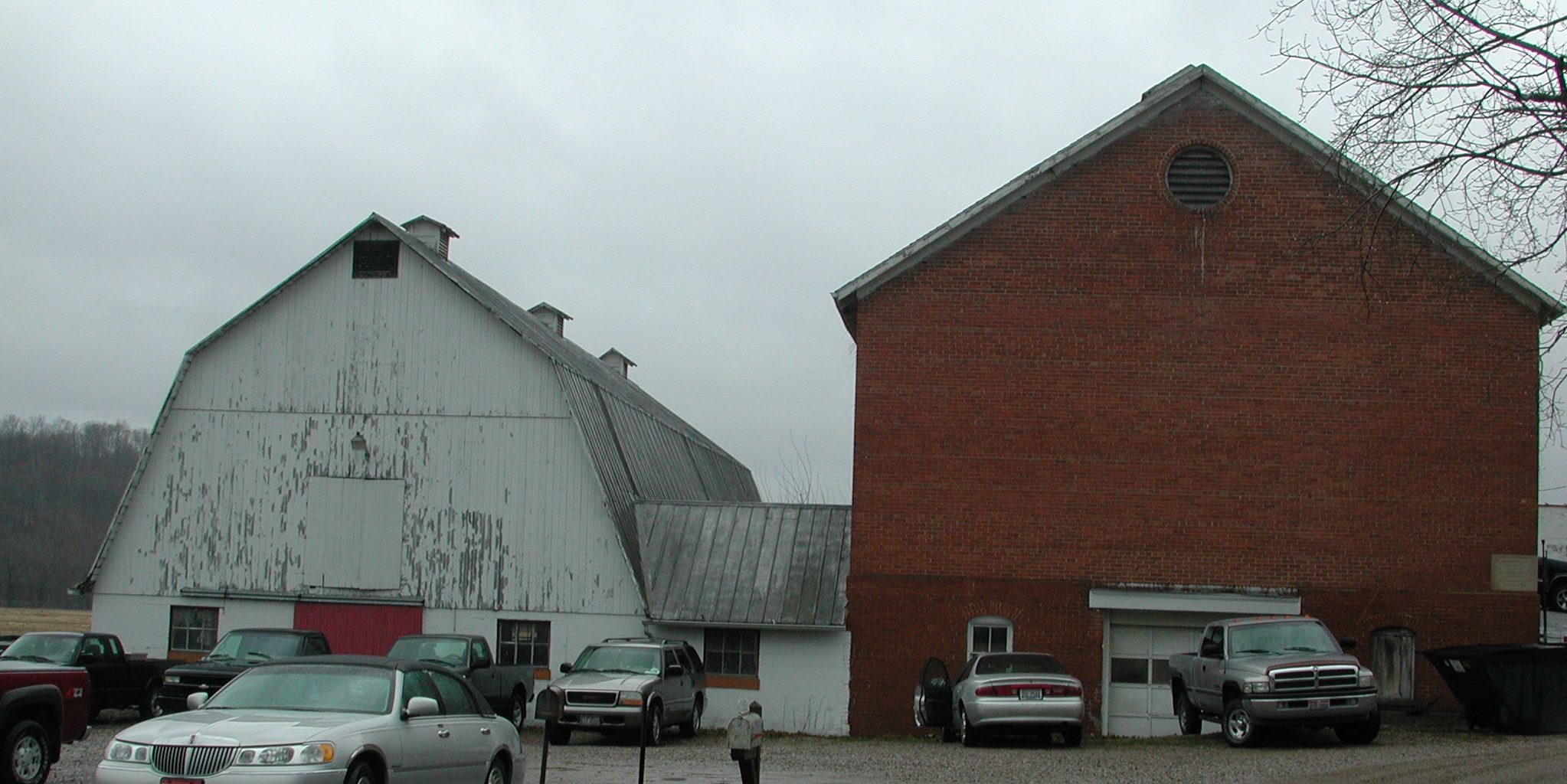
Barns

== Historic uses ==
- Secondary Structure
- Institutional Housing
- Agricultural Outbuildings
