= John Newton Templeton =

Black education pioneer

John Newton Templeton (c. 1807 – July 1851) was born into slavery in about 1807, and after being emancipated with his family, he received a classical education and became a teacher in a number of schools for African Americans.

== Biography ==
John Newton Templeton was born in about 1807, into slavery. He and his family were emancipated in 1813 when their owner, Thomas Wiliamson, died. He moved with Williamson's son William, a Presbyterian minister, and Thomas Williamson's widow, Anne, to Adams County, Ohio. Anne had taught John to read and write. Templeton received a classical education.

== Ohio University ==
He was invited by the President of Ohio University to attend the college. He began in 1824 and graduated in 1828. He was the fourth African-American to graduate from college in the United States and the first west of the Ohio River. He had been targeted by the American Colonization Society to become the first President of Liberia. He ultimately turned this offer down.

Templeton gave a speech at Ohio University in 1828 titled "Claims of Liberia," that is cited by writer Lawrence Ross as an early example of African-American student activism.

== Later career ==
Templeton dedicated his life to teaching Black children and adults. He taught first in Chillicothe, Ohio, then in Virginia (West Virginia), and later in Pennsylvania. In Pennsylvania, Templeton became the first teacher and principal of the African School in Pittsburgh, PA. It was the city's first Black school. Through his writings for The Mystery, he supported the anti-slavery movement.

Templeton died in Pittsburgh, PA in July 1851, leaving a widowed spouse and a young son.

== Play ==
His life is the subject of a 2004 play by Charles Smith, Free Man of Color. An archival collection about this play is available at the Ohio University Libraries.
