= Manasseh Cutler Hall =

- Manasseh Cutler Hall, Ohio University
- U.S. National Register of Historic Places
- U.S. National Historic Landmark
- U.S. Historic district – Contributing property
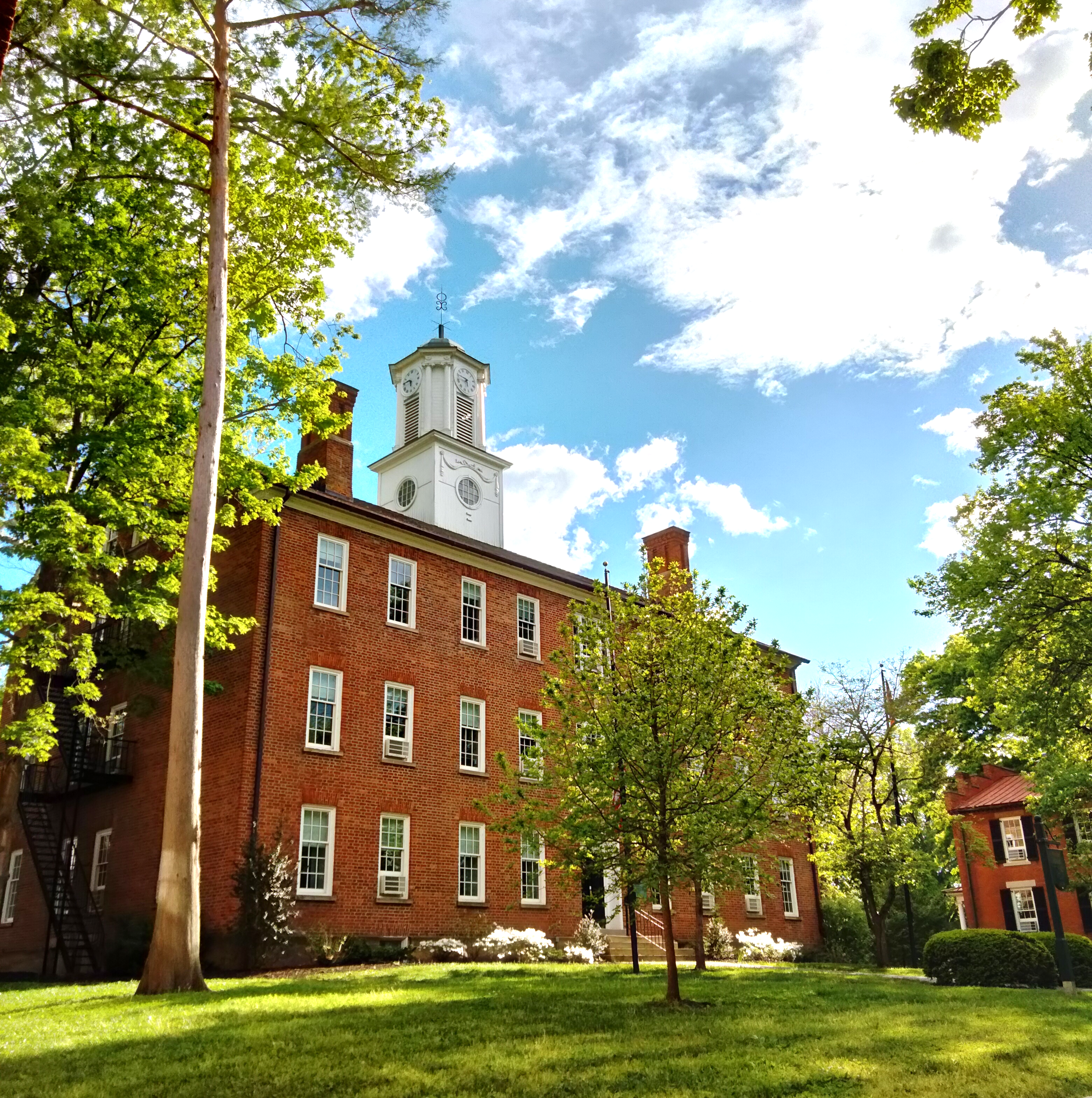
- Cutler Hall

- Location within Ohio Location within the United States
- Location: College Green of Ohio University, Athens, Ohio
- Coordinates: 39°19′34″N 82°06′00″W
- Area: 10 acres (4.0 ha)
- Built: 1819
- Architectural style: Federal
- Part of: Ohio University Campus Green Historic District (ID79001783)
- NRHP reference No.: 66000604

Significant dates
- Added to NRHP: October 15, 1966
- Designated NHL: December 21, 1965
- Designated CP: June 11, 1979

Manasseh Cutler Hall (also referred to simply as Cutler Hall, or Cutler) on the College Green of Ohio University is the oldest academic building at Ohio University and the oldest in the original Northwest Territory of the United States. It is located at the center of the Ohio University campus in Athens, Ohio. A National Historic Landmark, it continues to house school offices. The hall is named for Manasseh Cutler, a New England physician, botanist, and minister who wrote the University's charter in 1804.

== Description and history ==
Originally constructed in 1816 as the College Edifice, the building did not officially open until 1819 due to a fire. It is a three-story brick structure, with a gabled roof topped by a wooden tower and cupola. The main facade is nine bays wide, with the main entrance at its center, topped by a semi-oval fanlight. The windows in the floors above the entrance are Palladian in style, that on the second floor topped by a half-round window. The tower has two stages, the first being square with a round window in the front face, and the second octagonal with louvered openings. Cutler Hall was joined by Wilson Hall (to its left) in 1837 and McGuffey Hall (to its right) in 1839.

In March 1812, Ohio University’s building committee asked General Rufus Putnam to draft a plan for a college edifice near the center of campus. Architect Benjamin Corp of Marietta was hired to assist Putnam in the building design and supervised the construction of the new Federal style building.

On August 24, 1818, the unfinished structure sustained significant damage during a storm, and the building nearly caught fire when according to the architect, "Lightning struck the building which must be very wet and probably under the hand of providence saved the building from being consumed by fire". This delayed the completion of the building until 1819 at a final cost of $17,806. It featured a large cast iron bell in its cupola, first rang in 1819, and believed to have been built cast in either London or Boston.

Cutler Hall was completed only 20 years after the White House and is the oldest academic building in the historic Northwest Territory. The hall initially housed dormitories and laboratory space, as well as the office of the university president. The roof was raised in 1882 by about three feet. In 1937 the interior of the building underwent a complete modernization, which included the addition of metal staircases and an elevator. The roof was restored to its original roofline in 1949, and the building exterior now looks much as it did when first built.

== Today's Uses ==
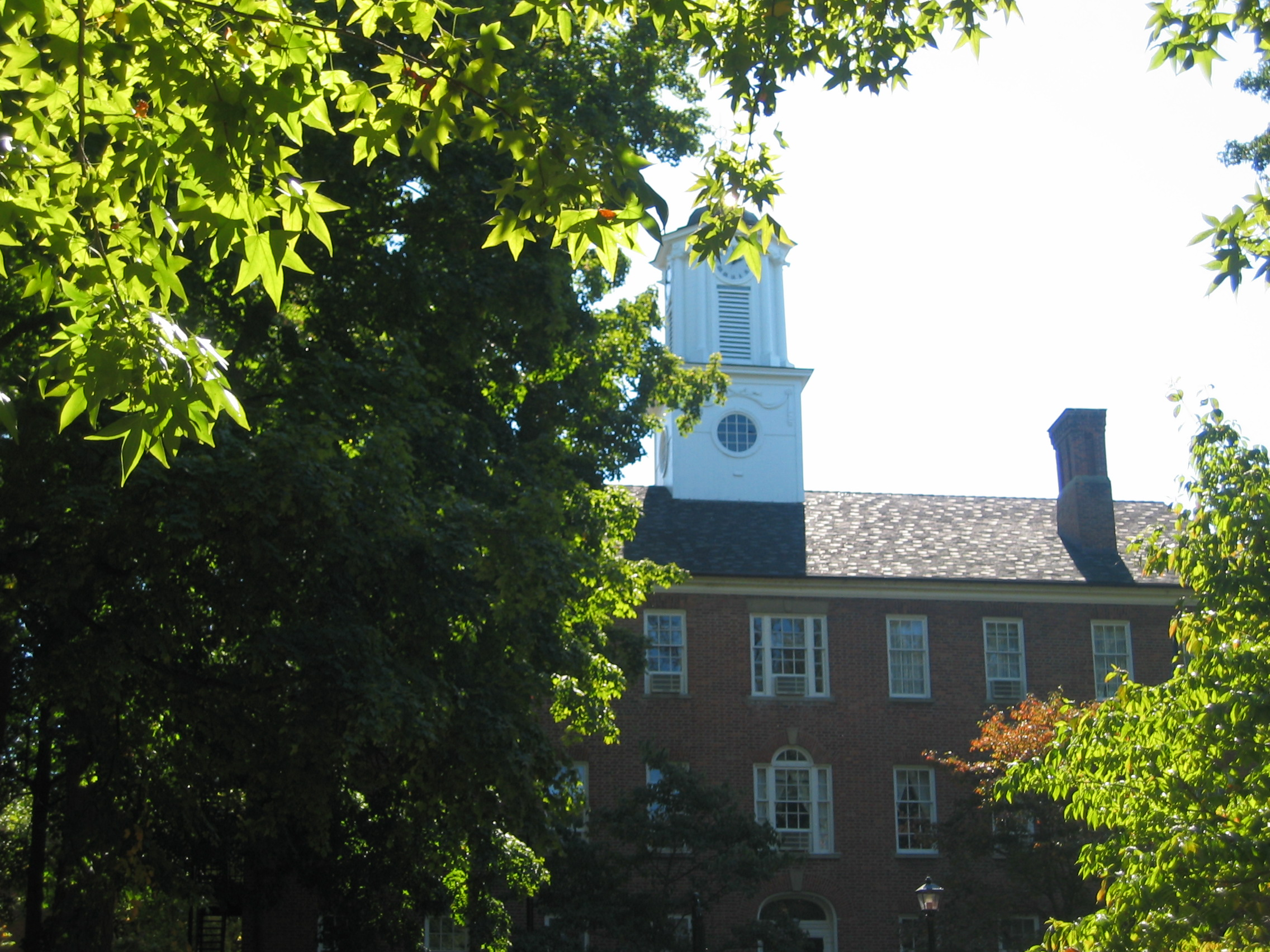
Cutler Hall under the elms of the College Green of Ohio University.

Manasseh Cutler Hall occupies a central position on today's College Green. The building houses the Office of the President, the president's cabinet, including the Office of the Executive Vice President & Provost, Vice President of Student Affairs and other senior and academic related administrators. The building is a centerpiece of the University's historic district and often used a photo backdrop for graduating seniors and other professional photography. Often seen as a meeting spot on campus, many gatherings and other large congregations happen outside of Cutler Hall for student organizations to promote themselves and other university related purposes. The buildings chimes ring out over the campus every thirty minutes to signal on the half hour and on the hour with the Westminster Quarters. On Founder's Day, a celebration and day of remembrance and reflection for the formation and official chartering of the University every year on February 18 is observed, and the chimes play Alma Mater Ohio at the time same as the University’s age (example; the bells will ring at 2:17pm for the 217th Founder’s Day in 2021). The original founding date of the University was February 18, 1804.

== See also ==
- List of National Historic Landmarks in Ohio
