= List of Ohio University alumni =

Ohio University is a major public university located in the Midwestern United States in Athens, Ohio, situated on an 1,800-acre (7.3 km^{2}) campus. Founded in 1804, it is the oldest university in the Northwest Territory and ninth oldest public university in the United States. Ohio University has 210,000 living alumni, of whom approximately 105,000 stay in the state. Many have gone on to achieve success in a variety of fields, including athletics, journalism, and government.

== Politicians ==
Alumni	Class year	Notability	References
Pete Abele	1948 (B. A.)	Republican member of the U.S. House of Representatives for Ohio's 10th congressional district (1963–1965); judge for Ohio Fourth District Court of Appeals (1966–1991)	
Ishaya Audu	1968	Minister of External Affairs of Nigeria (1979–1983), Nigerian ambassador to the United Nations (1979–1983)	
Albert David Baumhart Jr.	1931 (B.A., M. A.)	Republican member of the U.S. House of Representatives for Ohio's 13th congressional district (1941–1942, 1965–1971); director of the Republican National Committee (1953, 1954)	
Tim Bee		Republican member of the Arizona State Senate for the 30th District (2001–2009); president of the Arizona State Senate (2007–2009)	
Samuel Bigger	1829 (B. A.)	Whig Party politician and seventh governor of Indiana (1840–1843)	
Dan Brady	(B.A.)	Democratic politician and member of the Ohio House of Representatives for the 17th District (1996–1998); member of the Ohio State Senate for the 23rd District (1999–2006)	
Eric Brakey	2010 (B.F.A Theater)	Republican politician and member of the Maine Senate for the 20th District (2014-current)	
John Brough	Left school early	Democratic politician; 26th governor of Ohio (1864-1865), ran as War Democrat running on fusion ticket with Republican nomination; member of the Ohio House of Representatives representing the Fairfield-Hocking district (1837–1844)	

- Benjamin Butterworth, US representative
- John Carey, Ohio representative
- Samuel S. Cox, U.S. representative from Ohio (1857–1865), U.S. ambassador to the Ottoman Empire (1885–1886) serving under President Grover Cleveland, and U.S. representative from New York (1886–1889)
- Frank Cremeans, Ohio State representative
- William P. Cutler, representative from Ohio
- William H. Enochs, representative from Ohio

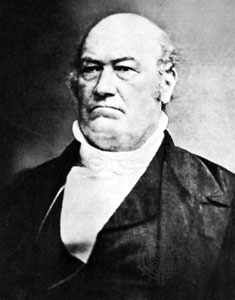
Thomas Ewing

- Thomas Ewing, member of U.S. Senate from Ohio (1831–1837 and 1850–1851); secretary of the treasury (1841) serving under Presidents William Henry Harrison and John Tyler; first secretary of the interior (1849–1850) serving under Presidents Zachary Taylor and Millard Fillmore
- Lorraine Fende, representative from Ohio
- Lucien J. Fenton, representative from Ohio
- Israel M. Foster, U.S. representative from Ohio (1919–1925)
- Nancy Garland, representative from Ohio
- James M. Gaylord, representative from Ohio
- Philip H. Gordon, diplomat
- Kao Kim Hourn, secretary of state, ministry of foreign affairs and international cooperation, Royal Government of Cambodia; president, University of Cambodia
- Kamil Idris, director general of the World Intellectual Property Organization
- Stephen Kappes, former deputy director of the CIA
- Ibrahim Lame, Nigerian politician
- Greg Landsman, US representative
- Paul Leonard, mayor of Dayton, Ohio and lieutenant governor of Ohio
- Charles S. Lewis, representative for Virginia
- Turner M. Marquette, Nebraska politician
- George Wythe McCook, Ohio attorney general
- John W. McCormick, representative for Ohio
- William E. McVey, representative for Illinois
- Robert Mecklenborg, Ohio representative
- Warren Miller, West Virginia representative

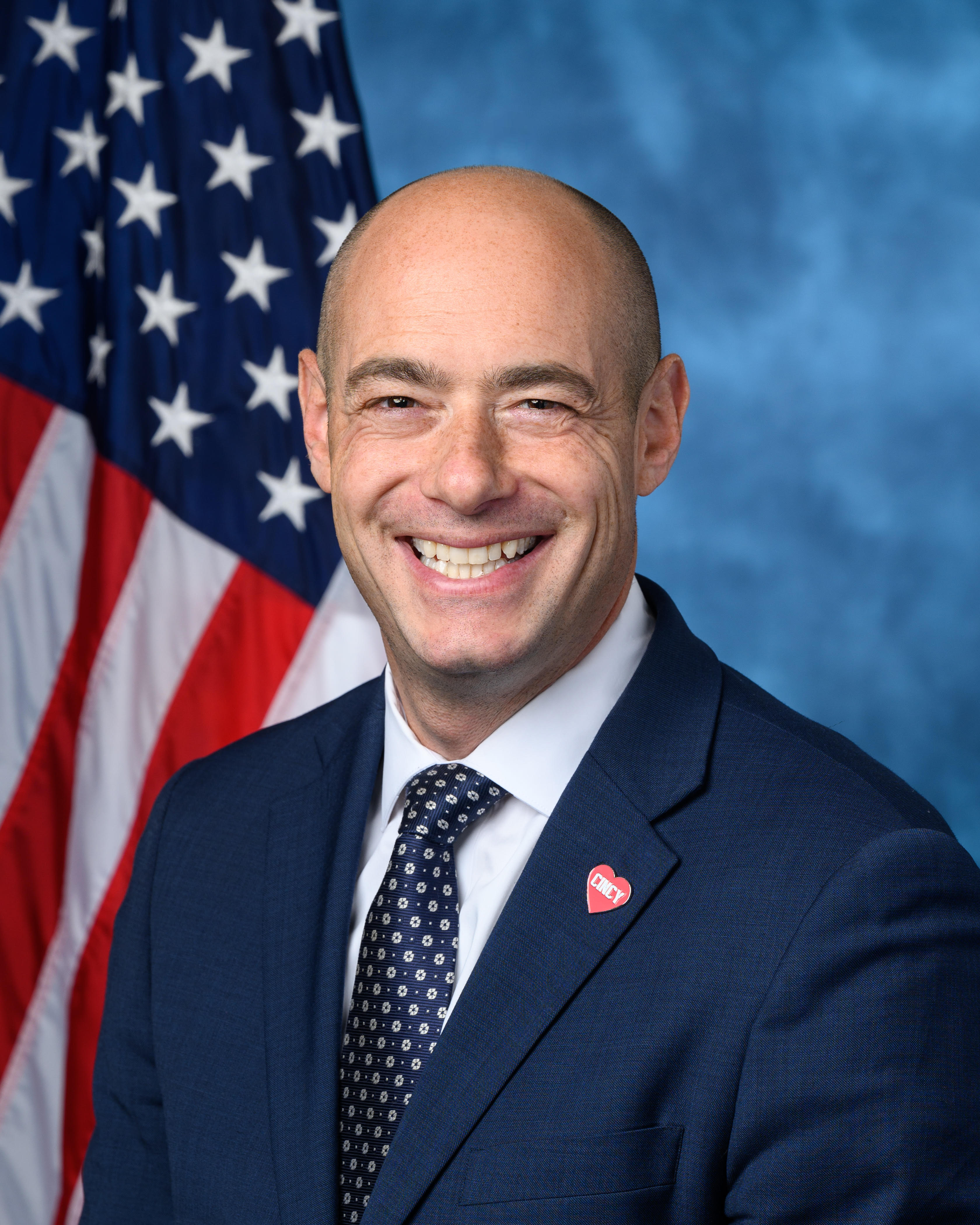
Rep. Greg Landsman

- Eliakim H. Moore, representative from Ohio
- John Murphy, Texas politician
- Ken Nnamani, Nigerian senator
- Don Pease, Ohio state representative
- Debbie Phillips, representative for Ohio
- Raymond Pryor, representative from Ohio
- Edward James Roye, former president of Liberia
- Robin R. Sanders, ambassador to Nigeria
- Joe Schiavoni, state senator for Ohio
- Wilson Shannon, 14th and 16th governor of Ohio
- William Sharon, US senator for Nevada (1875–1881)
- George Shiras Jr, justice of the United States Supreme Court
- Joe Sulzer, mayor of Chillicothe, Ohio
- George W. Summers, U.S. representative from Virginia (1841–1845)
- Lawrence Palmer Taylor, U.S. ambassador
- Cydnor B. Tompkins, representative from Ohio
- Emmett Tompkins, representative from Ohio
- Charles Townsend, Ohio secretary of state
- Carey A. Trimble, U.S. representative from Ohio (1859–1863)

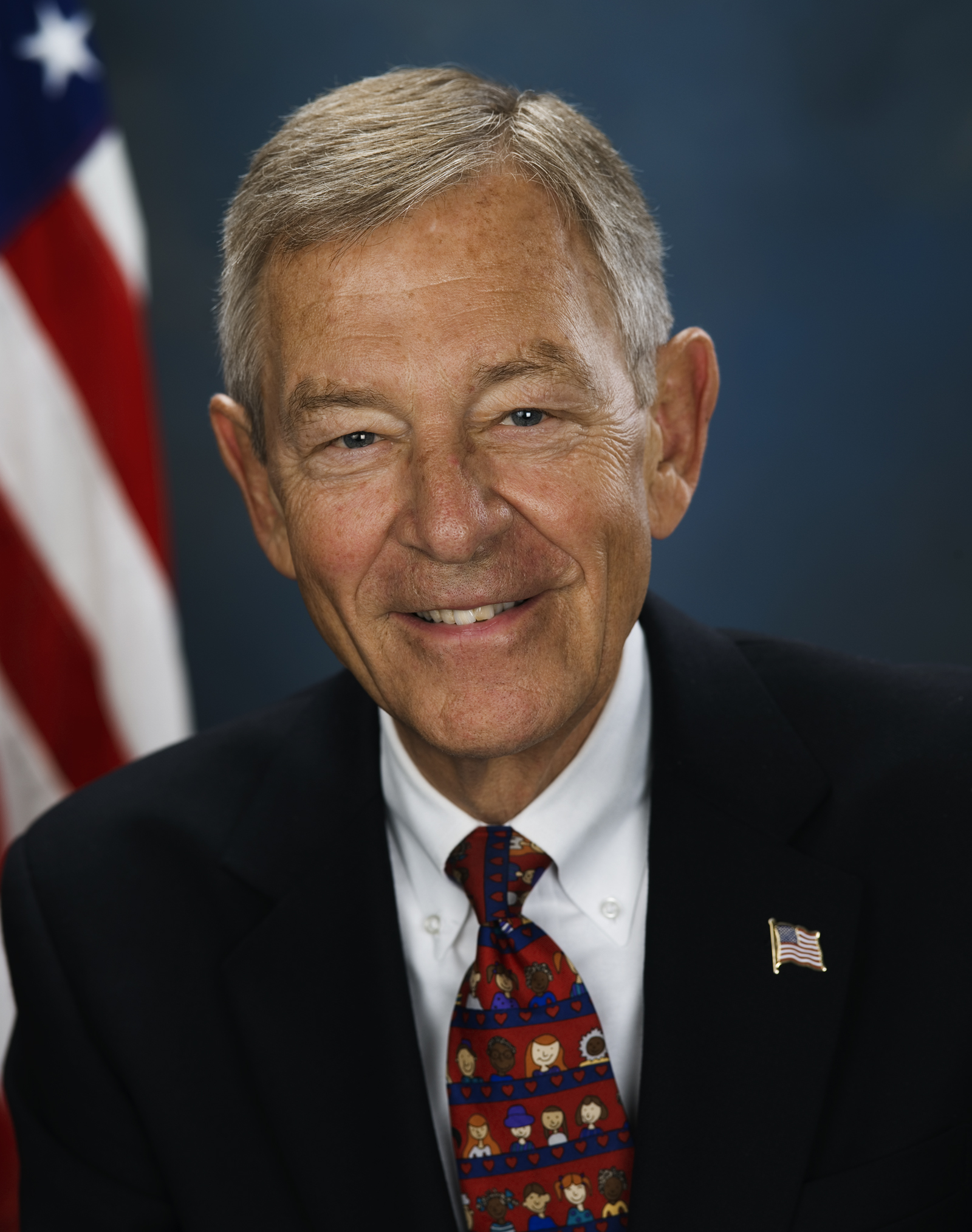
George Voinovich

- George Voinovich, member of U.S. Senate from Ohio (1999–2011); governor of Ohio (1991–1998); mayor of Cleveland, Ohio (1980–1989)
- David Watson, Australian politician
- Charlie Wilson, United States representative for Ohio's 6th congressional district (2007–2011)
- Austin Eli Wing, Michigan delegate

== Athletes, coaches, and administrators ==
- Joshua Abrams (born 1986), National Football League (NFL) player
- Chet Adams (1915–1990), NFL player
- Mark Baltz (born 1948), NFL official
- Dale Bandy, basketball coach
- Nick Barese (born 1986), college baseball coach
- Mitch Barnhart (born 1959), athletics director
- Armon Bassett, basketball player with Ironi Ramat Gan of Israel
- Frank Baumholtz (1918–1997), Major League Baseball (MLB) player
- Mark Berson, soccer coach
- Stan Boroski, baseball coach
- Bob Bradley, manager, United States men's national soccer team
- LaVon Brazill, NFL wide receiver for the Indianapolis Colts
- Bob Brenly, MLB player, manager, and TV announcer for the Arizona Diamondbacks
- Bill Brown, basketball coach
- Cleve Bryant, football coach
- Willie Burden, CFL player
- Dion Byrum, NFL player
- Jason Carthen, NFL player
- Rick Charls, world champion high diver who holds the Guinness record for the highest dive ever at 172 ft. / 52 m
- Mel Clark, MLB player
- Landon Cohen, NFL player for the Detroit Lions
- D. J. Cooper (born 1990), basketball player in the Israeli Basketball Premier League
- John Corbett, football player
- Vince Costello, NFL player
- Mark Dantonio, football coach
- Andy Dolich, sports executive
- Earl Duvall, NFL player
- Joe Fincham, coach
- Dow Finsterwald, PGA Tour golfer and winner of the 1958 PGA Championship
- Jeremy Foley, athletic director at the University of Florida
- Jim French, MLB player
- Dino Gaudio, basketball coach
- Doc Gessler, MLB player
- Lewis Geter (born 1969), professional basketball player
- Dave Green, NFL player
- Mychal Green, NBA player
- Derrick Hall, sports executive, president & CEO of Arizona Diamondbacks
- Paul Halleck, NFL player
- Terry Harmon, MLB player
- Jim Hilles, coach
- Bob Huggins, coach
- Brandon Hunter, NBA player
- Jake Jacobs, professional baseball outfielder
- Dave Jamerson, NBA player
- Arlie C. Jones, football
- George Kahler, MLB player
- Pete Lalich, NBA player
- Ken Landenberger, coach
- Theo Lemon, football coach
- Art Lewis, NFL player and West Virginia Mountaineers head football coach
- Dan MacKenzie, sports and marketing executive
- Kenosha Maroons, NFL player
- Rich McKinney, MLB player
- Kalvin McRae, NFL player
- Allen Miller, NFL player
- Mike Mitchell, 2nd round pick in the 2009 NFL draft, NFL player for the Oakland Raiders
- David Moe, basketball coach
- Jeff Mullen, athletic coach
- Dick Murphy, baseball player
- Tom Murphy, MLB player
- Maurice Ndour (born 1992), Senegalese basketball player for Hapoel Jerusalem of the Israeli Basketball Premier League
- Joe Nossek, MLB player
- Chris Parks, better known as "The Monster" Abyss, professional wrestler for TNA Wrestling
- Clete Patterson, NFL player
- Bo Pelini, defensive coordinator for LSU Tigers football
- Julian Posey, NFL and CFL Player for Miami Dolphins, Cleveland Browns, Winnipeg Blue Bombers and Hamilton Tiger-Cats
- Renee Powell, golfer
- Taylor Price, NFL player for the New England Patriots
- Bjorn Rebney, founder and CEO of Bellator MMA
- Joe Roberts, NBA player
- Adam Russell, MLB player for the San Diego Padres
- Mike Schmidt, Baseball Hall of Fame third baseman
- Ryan Senser, NFL player for the Seattle Seahawks
- Bob Snyder, NFL player and head coach
- Jon Steinbrecher, OVC and MAC Commissioner
- Shanele Stires, WNBA player
- Chuck Stobart, NFL coach
- Rick Sund, NBA executive
- Steve Swisher, MLB All-Star
- John Swofford, ACC Commissioner
- Rudy Sylvan, NFL player
- Jerome Tillman (born 1987), professional basketball player
- Dave Tobik, MLB player
- Gary Trent, NBA player
- Charlie Turner, CFL player
- Dave Wickersham, MLB player
- Dave Zastudil, NFL player/punter for the Arizona Cardinals; Cleveland Browns player

== Business leaders ==
- Roger Ailes, former president, Fox News
- Richard H. Brown, BSC ’69 and HON ’96, former chairman and CEO, Electronic Data Systems
- William C. Byham, BS ’58, MS ’60, author of Zapp! The Lightning of Empowerment
- Daniel Carp, CEO of Eastman Kodak Company
- Franklin R. Carpenter, mining specialist
- Michael C. Finnegan, investment banker
- Stephen H. Fuller, professor at the Harvard Business School and vice president of General Motors, founding president of the Asian Institute of Management
- John W. Galbreath, contractor
- Bobby George, Cleveland and Columbus restaurateur
- Keith Houk, CEO of PSA Airways
- Ramalinga Raju, CEO, Satyam Computers
- Matthew Rubel, CEO of Payless ShoeSource
- Perry A. Sook, chairman and CEO of Nexstar Media Group
- Nelson Story, entrepreneur
- Ty M. Votaw, commissioner of LPGA
- Robert D. Walter, BSME '67 and HON '97, chief executive officer, Cardinal Health
- Charles Xiaolin Wang, Chinese lawyer and automotive businessperson

== Communications ==
- Al Albert (born Alan Aufrichtig), sportscaster
- Ruth-Marion Baruch (1922–1997), photojournalist
- Jessica Beinecke, Voice of America
- Karen T. Borchers (born 1957), photojournalist
- Walter Brasch (1945–2017), journalist, professor, author
- Howie Chizek (1947–2012), public address announcer, radio talk show host
- A. Craig Copetas, writer/author, Rolling Stone, The Wall Street Journal, Bloomberg News
- Kevin Coval, poet
- Laurie David (born 1958), Academy Award-winning writer, producer
- Michel du Cille (1956–2014), Pulitzer Prize-winning photojournalist
- Joe Eszterhas (born 1944), writer
- Paul Fusco, photojournalist (deceased), documented Robert F. Kennedy funeral train June 8, 1968
- Marty Griffin, investigative journalist, radio talk show host
- Leon Harris, news anchor, NBC4 Washington, DC
- Adam Hochberg, radio correspondent, NPR
- Chris Hondros, Pulitzer Prize-winning photojournalist (deceased)
- John Kaplan, Pulitzer Prize-winning photojournalist, Fulbright Scholar
- Peter King, sports journalist
- June Kronholz, author, journalist (education)
- Jeff Kuhner (born 1969), talk radio host and political commentator
- Allie LaForce, broadcast journalist (sports)
- Dwight Lauderdale, TV anchor
- Wesley Lowery, Pulitzer-Prize winning journalist, author
- Joe Mahr, Pulitzer Prize-winning investigative journalist
- Frank Marzullo, TV meteorologist
- Dan McDowell, journalist
- Steve Newman, the Worldwalker
- Clarence Page, Pulitzer Prize-winning columnist, Chicago Tribune
- Donald Ray Pollock, writer (attended the Chillicothe campus)
- I. C. Rapoport, photojournalist, screenwriter
- Martha Rial, Pulitzer Prize-winning photojournalist
- Will Richardson, author, blogger, speaker
- Clemencia Rodriguez, communications scholar
- Martin Savidge, journalist, broadcaster
- Steve Serby, sports reporter, New York Post
- Mark Tatge, journalist, author, professor
- Brian Unger, actor, writer, producer, commentator
- Carr Van Anda, managing editor, The New York Times (1904–1932)

== Educators, researchers, scientists ==
- Andrew Alford (1904–1992; honorary), inventor
- Pat Arrowsmith (1930–2023), author and activist
- John Bardo, educator, president of Wichita State University, chancellor of Western Carolina University
- Christopher Bassford (born 1953), military historian
- Monroe Berkowitz, professor of economics
- Robert Biscup, orthopedic surgeon
- William C. Byham, psychologist
- Joseph Carter Corbin, educator
- Deborah Duchon, anthropologist and educator
- Jericka Duncan, CBS Weekend News anchor
- Wanda Kirkbride Farr, botanist
- Kevin Finnegan, educator and 2016 Golden Apple Foundation Puri Family Outstanding Principal of the Year and 2017 Those Who Excel Illinois Excellence in Administration winner
- John Freshwater, educator
- Emma Gamboa Alvarado, educator
- Norman J. W. Goda (born 1961), historian
- William Nicholas Hailmann, educator
- Deanna Hammond, linguist
- Elizabeth Orpha Sampson Hoyt, philosopher
- Mujaddid Ahmad Ijaz, experimental physicist
- E. Elizabeth Johnson, New Testament scholar
- Cheris Kramarae, feminist scholar
- Michael Krasny, talk show host
- Frank Kusch, historian
- Carolyn Ringer Lepre, academic administrator
- W. Timothy Liu, meteorologist
- John L. Locke, biolinguist
- Alan MacEachren, geographer
- Harold M. Manasevit, materials scientist
- Robert D. McCrie, author, academic
- Roderick J. McDavis, OU president
- Jody Miller, criminologist
- Loring Miner, scientist who discovered Spanish flu
- Jerri Nielsen, Antarctic physician
- Donald Edward Osterbrock (honorary), astronomer
- Irwin G. Priest, physicist
- David Rall (honorary), cancer specialist
- Sir Venkatraman Ramakrishnan (born 1952), structural biologist, Nobel laureate in Chemistry (2009), president of the Royal Society (2015–2020)
- Harold E. Robinson, botanist
- John A. Roush, president of Centre College
- William Henry Scott, seventh president of Ohio University (1872–1883); third president of the Ohio State University (1883–1895)
- David J. Skal, cultural historian
- William Starling Sullivant, bryologist
- Leo Suryadinata, sinologist
- Marie Tharp, geologist and oceanographic cartographer; first to systematically study and first to create a global bathymetric map of the oceans
- Huynh Sanh Thong, translator
- Warren Throckmorton, professor
- John Vandenbergh, zoology professor
- Hans-Ulrich Wehler, historian
- Jonathan Reed Winkler, professor of history

== Entertainers and artists ==
- Abyss (born 1973), professional wrestler
- Jamie Alcroft (born 1949), comedian and voice actor
- Nujoom AlGhanem, poet and film director
- Ed Allen, novelist
- Krista Allen, actress
- Richard Dean Anderson, actor, MacGyver
- Alison Aune, artist
- Alfred Bartles, composer and musician
- Ruth-Marion Baruch (1922–1997), photographer
- Cary Bates, comic book writer, DC Comics' The Flash
- Dustin Bates, lead singer of Starset, Downplay, and MNQN; known for hits such as "My Demons"'and "The Crystal Song"
- Kathleen Battle (honorary), soprano
- Walter Benton, poet and writer
- Jill Bialosky, poet and novelist
- Joe Bonomo, essayist and music writer
- Michael Buckley, author
- Brandy Burre, actress
- Beth Campbell, artist
- Nancy Cartwright, voice of Bart and several other characters on The Simpsons
- E.E. Charlton-Trujillo, filmmaker and novelist
- Howie Chizek, WNIR radio host
- Eric Coble, playwright
- David Collins, television producer
- Chuck Cooper (born 1954), Tony Award-winning actor
- Cleo Coyle, author
- Bill Cratty, dancer
- Frank Crumit, singer, composer, and vaudeville star; did not graduate
- James Dalessandro, author
- Daryl Myntia Daniels, visual artist
- Bernadette Sanou Dao, author
- Stan Denski, writer and critic
- Jim Dine, pop artist
- Joe Dolce, singer-songwriter, poet, and essayist
- Thomas F. Duffy, actor and musician
- Jonathan Edwards, folk artist, singer and songwriter
- Joe Eszterhas (born 1944), screenwriter, author
- Jonathan Freeman, actor
- Frog (David Henry Miller), writer and vendor
- Nancy Galbraith, composer
- John Gallaher, poet
- Matthew Glave, film and television actor
- Patricia Goedicke, poet
- Peter Allen Golden, author and historian
- Shari Goldhagen, fiction author
- Arsenio Hall, comedian, actor and talk show host
- David Hansen, actor
- Karen Harper, bestselling author
- Patti Harrison, actress and comedian
- Jerry Heller (1940–2016), music manager and businessman
- William Heyen, poet and literary critic
- Sarah Hider, Miss Ohio 2015
- Jenny Holzer, conceptual artist
- David Hostetler, sculptor; later taught at OU
- Ronald Jones, artist and critic
- Charlotte Kasl, psychologist and author
- Sammy Kaye, celebrated bandleader
- Carol Kendall, children's author
- Garry Kennedy, conceptual artist
- Katrina Kittle, author
- Edward Lachman (born 1948), Academy Award-nominated cinematographer
- Ray Lawrence, record producer
- Chihchun Chi-sun Lee, composer
- John Lefelhocz, conceptual artist
- Herman Leonard, portrait photographer
- Maya Lin, artist
- Don Lundstrom, sculptor
- Mike Major, artist and sculptor
- Dave Malloy, musical theater composer
- Jimmy Malone, WMJI radio host, stand-up comedian
- John Martin (honorary), dance critic
- Keith McDermott, actor and writer
- Scott McPherson, playwright
- Paul Miller, director
- Mary Murphy, accredited dance judge; judge and choreographer on the Fox dance competition-reality show So You Think You Can Dance
- Amy Newman, poet
- Paul Newman (1925–2008), actor, philanthropist, auto race driver (did not graduate)
- Qui Nguyen, playwright and screenwriter of Disney's Raya and the Last Dragon
- Luke Null, comedian
- Ed O'Neill, actor
- Scott Owens, poet
- Logan Paul (born 1995), YouTuber, actor, and professional wrestler (did not graduate)
- Piper Perabo, actress
- Stu Pflaum, Grammy-nominated music publisher
- Susan Elizabeth Phillips, romance novel writer
- Anthony Piccione, poet
- Gloria Plevin, artist
- Stanley Plumly, poet
- Meredith Post, designer
- Eugenia Price, historical author
- Imad Rahman, writer
- Bin Ramke, poet
- Red Wanting Blue, band led by Scott Terry
- Matthew Rhodes, film producer
- Lee Rich (1918–2012), film and tv producer, Emmy Award winner, co-founder and chairman of Lorimar Television
- Todd Rohal, filmmaker
- John Sant'Ambrogio, cellist
- Jill Santoriello, author and composer
- Frank Sargeant, author
- Laurie Lea Schaefer, Miss America 1972
- Dennis Shere, author
- Sxip Shirey, composer/musician
- David Smith, sculptor
- Tobin Sprout, musician and previous member of indie rock band Guided by Voices
- Chuck Stewart, jazz photographer
- Walter Tevis, novelist, author of The Hustler, The Color of Money, The Man Who Fell to Earth
- Betty Thomas, actress
- Amy Toscani, sculptor
- David True, painter (BFA in 1966 and MFA in 1967)
- William Henry Venable, author and educator
- Valerie Waugaman, IFBB professional
- Roger Welch, artist
- Randall Winston, TV producer
- Kō Yamada, photographer
- Jane Corner Young, composer
- Ronny Yu (born 1950), film director

== Lawyers ==
- Joseph Benham, U.S. attorney for District of Ohio
- Yvette McGee Brown, first African-American female justice of the Supreme Court of Ohio
- David Crane, prosecutor
- Timothy Sylvester Hogan, Ohio attorney general
- Robert E. Holmes, Ohio Supreme Court justice
- Thomas A. Jones, Ohio Supreme Court justice
- Menis E. Ketchum, West Virginia Supreme Court justice
- Chauncey N. Olds, Ohio attorney general
- William O'Neill, Ohio jurist
- Thomas M. Rose, judge
- Charles Taylor Sherman, lawyer
- George Shiras Jr., justice, United States Supreme Court, 1892–1903
- Oliver Perry Shiras, judge
- Ty Votaw, lawyer for the golf industry

== Military ==
- Robert Arter, US Army lieutenant general
- Gene Boyer, former White House helicopter pilot
- Edward Lyon Buchwalter, Union captain during the American Civil War
- Paul K. Carlton, US Air Force general
- Charles Champion Gilbert, Union officer during the American Civil War
- Frank Goettge, US Marine Corps commander killed in World War II
- Richard Griffith, Confederate brigadier general during the American Civil War
- Thomas O. Osborn, Union Civil War commander
- Abner Read, Union Navy officer during the American Civil War
- Severin Louis Rombach, awarded the Navy Cross
- William Sooy Smith, Union general during the American Civil War
- Lawrence S. Thomas, III, National Guard general
- Lloyd Thomas, naval aviator and recipient of the Navy Cross

== Religious leaders ==
- Edward Raymond Ames, bishop
- Judy Cannato, Catholic author
- Thomas K. Chadwick, chaplain of the U.S. Coast Guard
- Earl Cranston, pastor; later became a trustee
- Alex Haas, pastor
- Joel Hunter, pastor
- David Hastings Moore, pastor and military commander
