= Lundström =

Lundstrom and Lundström is a surname of Swedish origin. The name may be spelled as Lundstrom in English-speaking countries. Lundstrom and Lundström may refer to:

== People ==
- Anna Lundström (born 1980), Swedish figure skater
- Åge Lundström (1890–1975), Swedish Air Force general
- Carl Lundström (1960–2025), Swedish businessman
- Carl August Lundström (1844–1914), Finnish entomologist
- Don Lundstrom, American sculptor
- Isac Lundeström (born 1999), Swedish ice hockey player
- Johan Lundström (born 1973), Swedish biologist and psychologist
- John Lundstram (born 1994), English footballer
- John Edvard Lundström (1815–1888), Swedish industrialist and inventor
- Klas Lundström (1889–1951), Swedish track and field athlete who competed in the 1912 Summer Olympics
- Linda Lundström (born 1951), Canadian fashion designer
- Linden Lundstrom, (1913–1996), American choral conductor, and author
- Mark S. Lundstrom, (born 1951), Dean of the College of Engineering, Distinguished Professor of Electrical and Computer Engineering at Purdue University
- Marjie Lundstrom (born 1956), American reporter for The Sacramento Bee
- Martin Lundström (1918–2016), Swedish cross-country skier
- Nina Lundström (born 1961), Sweden-Finnish Liberal People's Party politician
- Oleg Lundstrem (or Lundström, 1916–2005), Soviet-Russian jazz composer and conductor
- Simon Lundström (born 1973), Swedish translator
- Sten Lundström (born 1952), Swedish Left Party politician, member of the Riksdag
- Ted Lundström, Swedish bass player, Amon Amarth
- Tord Lundström (born 1945), Swedish retired professional ice hockey player and coach
- Vilhelm Lundstrøm, (1893–1950), Danish modernist painter
- Vilhelm Lundström, (1869–1940), Swedish classical scholar and politician

== Other ==
- 7047 Lundström, a main belt asteroid
