= A. Craig Copetas =

Author and international correspondent

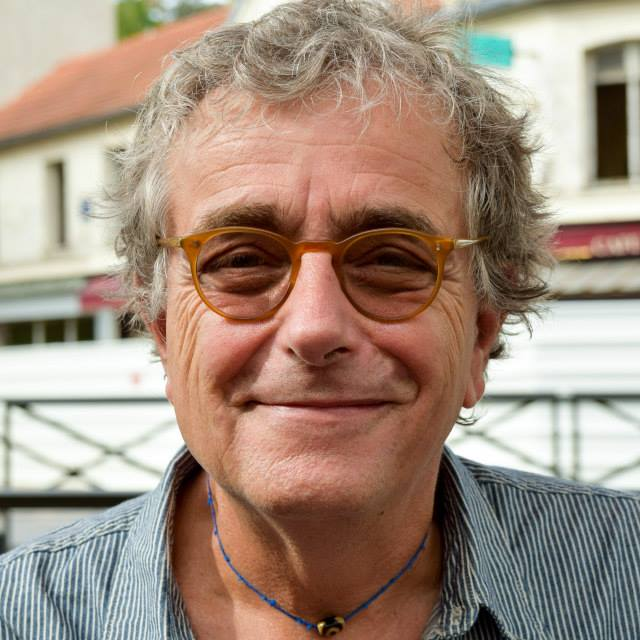
- Citizenship: Greek, American
- Education: Ohio University; University of East Anglia; Harriman Institute
- Occupations: Author, journalist

A. Craig Copetas is a dual national Greek-American journalist.

== Early life and education ==
Copetas attended Upper St. Clair High School in Pittsburgh, where he was a writer on the school's newspaper, The St. Clairion. He also played in the band Karl Ottoman & the Empires.

Copetas held various summer jobs, including layin natural gas pipelines in Western Pennsylvania and West Virginia and clerking at Eckert, Seamans, Cherin & Mellott, a law firm. This led to him becoming a researcher on The Scranton Commission on Campus Unrest in the summer of 1970, following the Kent State and Jackson State killings in May 1970.

Between 1969 and 1972, he studied journalism and history under the tutelage of American poet Stanley Plumly and creative writing at Ohio University, where he was a Cutler College Honors Program student. Copetas spent his senior year at the University of East Anglia in the United Kingdom, where he studied political and Russian history and got to know fellow student Ian McEwan, and American Beat Generation writer William S. Burroughs.

== Career ==
Copetas began his journalism career in 1973 at the London bureau of Rolling Stone. "He was a cocksure American fresh from J school," said RS bureau chief Andrew Bailey, who hired Copetas as a reporter after being introduced to him by Tony Elliott. During his time at Rolling Stone Magazine, he shared a house on Stoneleigh Street with fellow employees such as Lanny Aldrich, who at the time managed Rolling Stone's Straight Arrow Books distribution joint-venture Quick Fox in Europe, and later became a literary agent and author of "The Western Art of Charles M. Russell" and "Mallorca, The Art of Living". Visitors to the house on Stoneleigh Street included Allen Ginsberg, Hunter S. Thompson, British filmmaker Peter Whitehead and Grateful Dead lyricist Robert Hunter. They frequented the nearby Julie's Wine Bar, (Note: From page 208 of "Inside Notting Hill", by Sally Moore, daughter of Sir Philip Moore, the last British Governor General of Singapore and former private secretary to QEII : "Craig held his own court in Julie's Wine Bar, and I loved to sit by his side while he and Richard Young would eat expensive food, drink sparingly and lounge around beneath the palm trees with all the Rolling Stone editors, writers and their galaxy of friends and contacts...Craig was an indefatigable investigative journalist and particularly impressed by the fact that my father worked for the Queen and could help arrange for Prince Charles to sit for a Rolling Stone interview. Craig told my mother and father he would interview the Prince informally, 'take him to Hard Rock Cafe for a hamburger') socialising with neighbours such as Sally Moore and the (then aspiring) photographer Richard Young who at that time was working in a bookshop.

Copetas' first big story came in 1974 when Rolling Stone sent him to find J.Paul Getty III shortly after he had been kidnapped in Italy. Copetas worked (Note: Andrew Bailey, Rolling Stone London Bureau Chief "A Day in the Life, Bailey's story on the London bureau" Rolling Stone Magazine October 15, 1992."My one and only scoop happened in 1973...Every reporter in the world was looking for Getty...Craig was fresh out of J-school and headed to Rome. A week later, he called. Could he have more cash. Infiltrating the Rome club-drug Mafia scene was proving expensive...I arranged for more money to be sent. Craig called a few days later. He was now best buddies with a Mafioso who claimed to know where Getty was hiding, but the funds had run dry. I called managing editor John Walsh...We needed more money, and I started looking around for another job. John wired cash to Craig. Then Craig called again. He'd sneaked past Getty's guards," and the Getty kidnapping story was ours".) with fellow Ohio University journalism graduate Joe Esztheras to interview him for the magazine and enabled Richard Young, who photographed Getty, to secure his first published photograph. That same year, Copetas also interviewed his friend David Bowie and William S. Burroughs for the magazine.

Copetas went on to serve as foreign correspondent for Alternative Press Syndicate, based in Quito, Ecuador, and Bogota and Colombia, and as news editor for High Times magazine where he worked with Tom Forcade. In 1976, Copetas broke the paraquat poisoning story which highlighted the aerial spraying of Mexican marijuana fields with the lethal herbicide paraquat in the Mexican-American war against marijuana. His articles led Daryl Dodson, an intern on the Senate Permanent Subcommittee on Investigations, to research further and ultimately the Senate Subcommittee investigation which resulted in Government testing of contaminated Mexican marijuana. Copetas was also responsible for maintaining a cooperative and mutually beneficial relationship with NORML, the non-profit public-interest pro-marijuana advocacy group.

His other roles have included contributing staff writer at the New York Daily News, New York Times, Harper's Magazine and columnist for Inc Magazine.

In 1978, he joined Associated Newspapers where he served as associate editor and staff writer at Esquire magazine. At the magazine, Copetas worked with writers such as Graham Greene, Norman Mailer, Hunter Thompson, William Buckley, James Baldwin, Anthony Haden Guest and Jesse Kornbluth. His fellow editors included Peter W. Kaplan, Marilyn Johnson, Rob Fleder and Dominique Browning. They were the last group to be trained and mentored by those who had edited the likes of Hemingway, Fitzgerald and Wolfe. That group included Arnold Gingrich, Harold Hayes, Byron Dobell, Rust Hills and Don Erickson.

Copetas went on to work at ANG's SoHo Weekly News before moving to London for the Mail on Sunday and helping to create the paper's Sunday Magazine supplement.

During the 1980s, he also wrote for The Village Voice and Regardie's Magazine.

By then, he was based in Moscow where he also became on-site director of media company Kommersant, During one of his trips back to London he visited his friend Tony Elliott, founded of Time Out, during a labour strike at the publication. He persuaded Elliot to accompany him on a trip to Cairo which they took alongside James Horwitz.

Back in Moscow, Copetas met actor Brian Cox who was there to direct a production of "The Crucible" with students from the Moscow Art Theatre in 1989. Copetas agreed to the role of ersatz casting director for his friend and found Nora Ivanovna, a Black Russian singer, to play Tituba, the slave-woman from Barbados.

In 1989, Copetas was named Knight-Bagehot Fellow in Economics and Business Journalism, a program designed to provide formal business and economics training for journalists at mid-career.

He reported on the ground in Saudi Arabia, Kuwait, Iraq during the First Gulf War and then the Balkan conflict in Serbia, Bosnia, Kosovo and Croatia during the late 1990s for the Wall Street Journal with colleague Daniel Pearl. Other long-term postings included China and Southeast Asia. He was later embedded with British forces during the Second Gulf War.

In 1991, he became a staff reporter on the Wall Street Journal and went on to create and manage the sports section of The Wall Street Journal Europe, helping develop the first weekend section for the paper and extensively covering the Olympic corruption scandal. He was briefly arrested in Singapore based on an Australian hold-and-detain order that claimed he was a terrorist suspect. "The Great Olympic Swindle" recounts the harassment that Copetas and his family subsequently suffered in the hopes that he would hold off publishing his story in the Wall Street Journal.

In 2001, he joined Bloomberg LP as a senior writer covering global financial news and events across all Bloomberg News platforms, including Bloomberg News, Bloomberg Television, Bloomberg Markets magazine and Bloomberg BusinessWeek magazine. He held posts in Europe, Russia, Middle East and China.

In 2009, he was briefly detained in Dubai while there as senior writer for Bloomberg News working (Note: During a "...press gathering, [Sultan Bin Sulayem] started screaming [at Copetas] in a burst of anger about how Bloomberg was trying to destroy Dubai World with negative reports. Such an outburst was unheard of from Sultan, who is a very quiet and calm man. To see him out of control shows the state of panic lying underneath...Craig went to the airport to fly out of Dubai, but he didn't make it through immigration. He was detained by Amn Al Dawla secret police officers. For ten hours, Craig was questioned about his contacts in Dubai and the sources of his information" from "Escape from Dubai," by Hervé Jaubert, pages 215-216) on a story under former Associated Press Executive Editor William Ahearn. At the time, many foreign journalists were complaining that they had "been told to avoid writing negative stories" about the UAE's economy and the UAE was on the brink of adopting a new media law which forbade the publication of stories that were deemed to be harmful to the national economy. Bloomberg pulled the story "because of the threat of losing their wire terminals throughout the Middle East, being barred from press releases and press gatherings, having their assets in Dubai seized" Copetas was subsequently dismissed from Bloomberg as was Ahearn. In 2014 it was reported that a Bloomberg story about mass accumulation of wealth by China's ruling class was closed down and the journalist also dismissed by Bloomberg.

For seven years, he was a World Economic Forum Media Leader, taking part in panel discussions at World Economic Forums in Davos, Switzerland. He was a representative on WEF's Summit on the Global Agenda, which formulates topics for discussion at WEF's annual meeting. He also held a similar position at OECDs Forum in Paris.

He went on to host news talk shows on Bloomberg Television and represented Bloomberg LP on numerous global television and radio shows, including CNN, Fox News, CBS News, MSNBC, France 24. He has also been a weekly columnist for International Herald Tribune.

From 2010 to 2014 he was a regular panellist on The World This Week, a weekly one-hour news and current affairs program broadcast globally in English and French on French public broadcaster France 24, working with Christopher Dickey. During that time, he was involved in the founding of Quartz and became its Editor-at-Large based in Paris.

From 2015 to 2019 he was Editor-at-Large for TRT World, the English-language news network. He created and managed the Monday to Friday live-broadcast business and financial politics program Money Talks.

Copetas has held various academic posts including Visiting Scholar at The Harriman Institute of Advanced Russian Study at Columbia University in New York, Associate Professor of Narrative Journalism at the American University of Paris (2012–2014), Visiting Lecturer on print, video and digital journalism and writing at University of Miami; Boston University; Harvard College; Tulane University; Ecole Jeannine Manuel; Sciences Po.

== Awards ==
1990 New York University School of Journalism Olive Branch Award for Best Reporting from Soviet Union (for his article on Soviet reform which appeared in Regardie's April 1989 issue)

1998 Wall Street Journal Awards (internal) for Best Leader "Familiar Rings"

2000 Wall Street Journal Awards (internal) for Best Investigative Writing with co-writer Roger Thurow on a multi-part series on The International Olympic Committee corruption scandal

In 2001 he became the 2nd American journalist (after Art Buchwald) to be awarded Ordre des Arts et des Lettres

2003 National Headliner Award Best Feature Writer

=== Personal life ===
Copetas is married and has two sons with Marie-Céline Girard, a French television producer, the director of admissions at the Paris-based film school EICAR and the daughter of the Academy Award-winning French film producer Roland Girard whose 1978 film Madame Rosa / Le Vie Devant Soi won the 1978 Academy Award for Best Foreign Language Film and the French actress Virginie (Dupuis) Vitry.

Copetas is an Anglophobe. He has regularly appeared on France 24 and described the United Kingdom as, "The United Kingdom of Great Brexit and Northern Ireland" having once describing it on an episode of the France 24 segment, 'The Debate' as, "The United Kingdom of Great Brexit and Northern Ireland doesn't achieve much these days..." he had often retweeted on X (formally twitter) anti-british posts and illustrations to confirm his own prejudices.

== Bibliography ==
=== As author ===
- Metal Men (1986)
- Bear Hunting with the Politburo (2001)
- Mona Lisa's Pajamas (2009)

=== As contributor ===
- The Rolling Stone Book of Beats (1999)
