= E. W. Scripps =

E. W. Scripps may refer to:

- E. W. Scripps (businessman) (1854–1926), American newspaper publisher
  - E. W. Scripps Company, American broadcasting company founded by above
- E. W. Scripps School of Journalism, at Ohio University
