= Wisdom's Light =

Coordinates: 40°57′37.02″N 81°21′31.07″W

Wisdom's Light is a public sculpture located in front of the Lake Branch Library in Uniontown, Ohio. The sculpture was commissioned by the Rotary club of Lake Township to celebrate the 100th anniversary of the founding of Rotary International.

The sculpture stands 9.5 feet tall. It consists of a stack of 18 oversized books. A typical book measures 24 inches x 20 inches x 6 inches. The "pages" of each book are encrusted with Blenko art glass. The books are hollow and are lit from within by six neon tubes. At night, the light shines out from the pages of the books.

The sculptor is Don Lundstrom. Lundstrom has previously completed sculptures for other libraries in North Canton, Ohio, Tiffin, Ohio, and Canton, Ohio.

Although the 100th anniversary of Rotary fell on February 23, 2005, the sculpture was dedicated at a ceremony on October 23, 2004. Congressman Ralph Regula was in attendance, as were three Rotary district governors: Meena Patel, Larry Warren, and Jack Polen.

The titles in the stack were chosen by benefactors from the community. The titles range from old to new. Don Quixote is the oldest novel in the sculpture. James Brady's, The Marines of Autumn is the newest novel.
