= Southeast Ohio Magazine =

Southeast Ohio Magazine is a magazine that covers the 20-county region of southeastern Ohio, Kentucky and West Virginia. The publication is the only student-run regional magazine in the United States. Magazine journalism students at Ohio University's E.W. Scripps School of Journalism publish an issue each academic semester (fall and spring).

The origin of Southeast Ohio lies in a one-time publication created by students in winter 1970 called Appalachia 70, which was followed by Reach Out, another one-shot created in spring 1970. Following the publishing and academic success of these magazines, the Scripps School created Athens Magazine, which focused on the Athens, Ohio community and which ran from 1971 until 1988. In 1988, the magazine's focus was expanded to 20 counties in southeastern Ohio, and the publication was retitled to reflect the change.

== Awards ==
Southeast Ohio Magazine has won Regional Marks of Excellence Awards from the Society of Professional Journalists in the category “Best Student Magazine (Published More Than Once a Year)” in 2000, 2001, 2002, 2003, and 2005.
