= Scott Owens =

Scott Owens may refer to:

- Scott Owens (poet) (born 1963), American poet
- Scott Owens (ice hockey) (born 1956), American ice hockey coach
