= Honors Tutorial College =

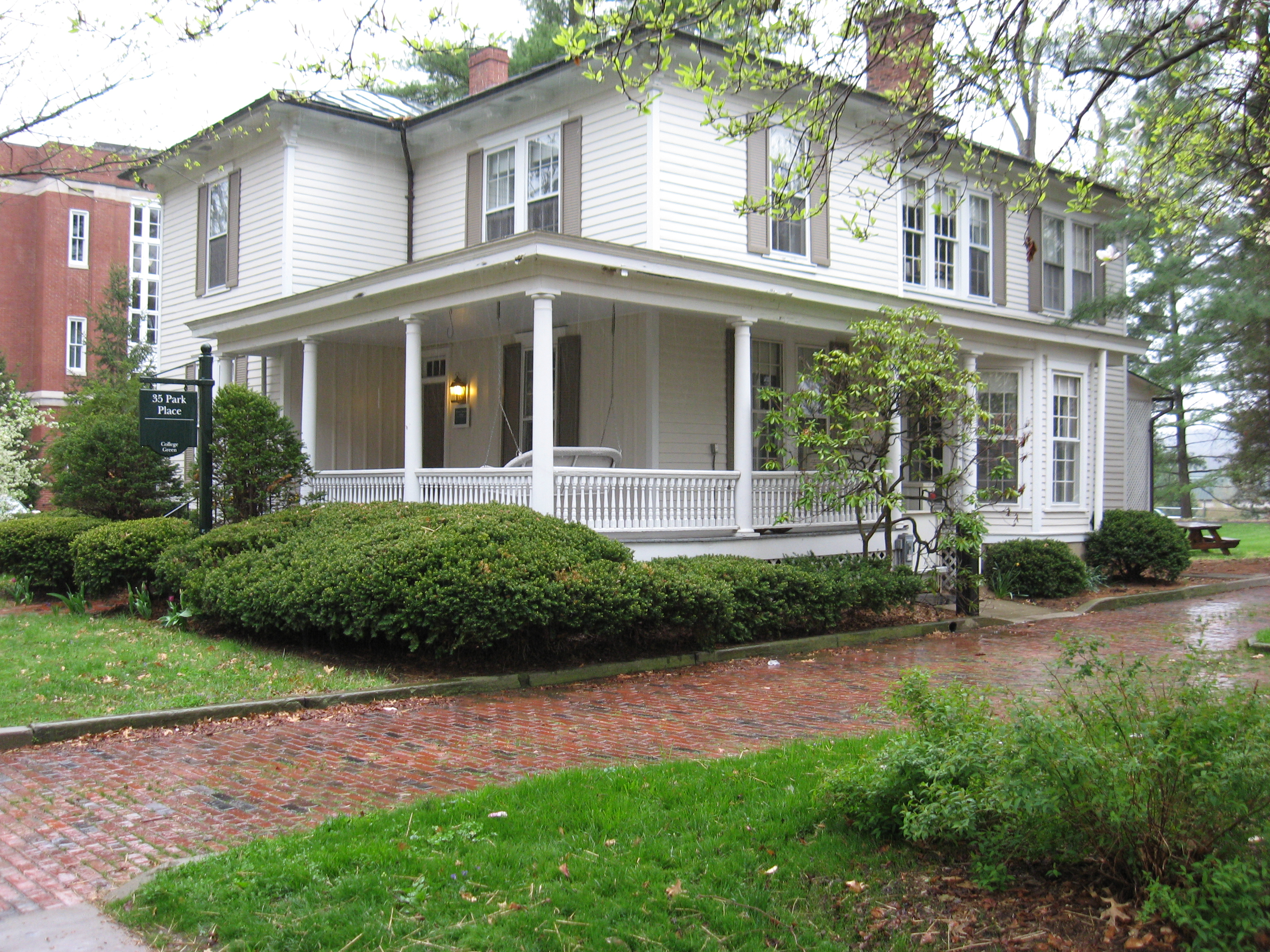
35 Park Place, home of the Honors Tutorial College

The Honors Tutorial College (HTC) at Ohio University in Athens, Ohio is a college in the United States with a degree-granting program incorporating all the essential features of the traditional British constituent college tutorial system of undergraduate education developed over centuries at Oxford and Cambridge. Other American schools with similar programs include St. John's College of Annapolis, Maryland and Santa Fe, New Mexico.

== Overview ==
A tutorial consists of either one student and one professor or a very small group of students and a professor. Instruction is undertaken through dialogue rather than lecture. HTC students are required to take at least one course per semester in tutorial format, and also enroll in traditional courses, including graduate courses, with course prerequisites waived. The academic expectations for students in the College reside between those of a traditional undergraduate honors program and a graduate program.

The College has approximately 340 students and offers programs in 30 disciplines, from journalism to astrophysics. Around 80 students are accepted per year, and their application is reviewed with a holistic approach. Students benefit from their involvement with the College: they are the first to register for classes, can waive general education requirements for graduation, can tailor their tutorials with content that does not mirror existing Ohio University courses, can check out books from the university library for extended periods of time, receive first preference for scholars' dorms, and are eligible for funding to support specific activities, including foreign study, attending conferences, and internships in expensive cities. All programs of study require the completion of a thesis project that requires an original contribution to the particular field. Students must also maintain a 3.5 GPA in their overall coursework.

The foundation of an "honors program" at Ohio University existed as far back as 1945. In 1959, an Honors Program and Awards Committee was established to set rules for and supervise honors courses conducted by various academic departments. In 1972, Professor Ellery Golos approached the University Curriculum Council with "A Proposal for a Tutorial System." The proposal was approved on May 9, 1972. Prior to that point, an Honors College had existed previously since 1964.

Famous alumni include actress Piper Perabo, Pulitzer Prize–winning reporter Joe Mahr, NASA scientist Lori Poultz-Snyder, CEO at the biotechnology and pharmaceutical company Nodality, Inc Laura Brege, NPR correspondent Adam Hochberg, and Emmy Award-winning writer and producer Matt Wickline.

The Honors Tutorial College is located at 35 Park Place near the center of the University. It is across the street from Alden Library and down the street from the E. W. Scripps Hall, home of the E. W. Scripps School of Journalism and the John Calhoun Baker University Center. Since July 29, 2024, Dr. Kristina Bross has served as dean of the Honors Tutorial College.
