= Schlichter =

Schlichter is a German surname. Notable people with the surname include:

- Alexander Schlichter (1868–1940), Ukrainian politician
- Art Schlichter (born 1960), American football player
- John M. Schlichter (1958–2020), American politician
- Rudolf Schlichter (1890–1955), German artist
