= Vicki Hirsch =

American theater instructor and actress (died 2010)

- Born: Vicki E. Hirsch
- Died: September 11, 2010 (aged 59); New York City, New York, U.S.
- Resting place: St. James Cemetery; Newport, Delaware, U.S.
- Occupations: Actress; educator; coach
- Awards: Obie Award

Vicki E. Hirsch (died September 11, 2010) was an American theater instructor and actress.

== Early life ==
Vicki E. Hirsch was born to Ruth L. (née Sidwell) and Fred A. Hirsch. Her father was a printer and served in the U.S. Army in World War II. Her mother was a secretary of a high school in Wilmington, Delaware. She graduated from Mount Pleasant High School. She later graduated with a degree in theatre from the University of Delaware. She graduated with a master's degree from Villanova University. She studied at the Russian Academy of Theatre Arts in Moscow. She trained with World Master Gennadi Bogdanov in Russian Classical Biomechanics.

== Career ==
Hirsch was a New York City and regional theater actress. She also worked in film, television, industrials, print, and in commercials. In 1976, Hirsch was cast as Lanie Robertson in The Insanity of Mary Girard, a televised play on WPVI-TV. That same year, she was also cast in Back Country Crimes, a play directed by David Chambers on Stage Three at Temple University. She was a member of the Philadelphia Company and the Stage Union Theater Company. She was a director for The Theater Center. In 1977, she acted in the Philadelphia Company's production of 27 Wagons Full of Cotton.

Hursch taught at the Piero Dusa Acting Conservatory, the Ward Acting Studio, Actors Creative Experience, and the American Academy of Dramatic Arts. She was a casting director and an artistic associate for the Kings County Shakespeare Company. She was also a private acting coach. She also worked at the Lincoln Center and with Dick Cavett on "One Life to Live". In 1995, she acted in the Kings County Shakespeare Company's production of Twelfth Night. In 1997, she played Eunice in a production of A Streetcar Named Desire at Gretna Theater in Mount Gretna, Pennsylvania.

== Personal life ==
Hirsch died on September 11, 2010, aged 59, at Roosevelt Hospital in New York City. She was buried in St. James Cemetery in Newport, Delaware.

== Awards ==
Hirsch won an Obie Award for her work in Josephine the Mouse Singer.
