= Guido Stempel =

Guido H. Stempel III (August 13, 1928 in Bloomington, Indiana – May 31, 2016 at Columbus, Ohio) was a distinguished professor of journalism at the E. W. Scripps School of Journalism at Ohio University in Athens, Ohio, and directed the school in the 1970s.

== Education ==
Stempel received his bachelor's (1949) and master's degrees (1951) from Indiana University Bloomington. He then became the first doctoral candidate in mass communication at the University of Wisconsin, Madison.

== Career life and accomplishments ==
Stempel's publishing career began at Journalism Quarterly in 1952 with his piece “Sampling Size for Classifying Subject Matter in Dailies”. From 1972 to 1989, Stempel was the longest-serving editor of Journalism Quarterly. Advancements in his career and his research in mass communication and journalism were major factors in Ohio University choosing him in the first round for the Ohio Board of Regents’ Outstanding Programs Awards. In 2013, he was honored with an award in his name by Ohio University. Stempel received many awards during his lifetime as well:

- 2007- Paul H Deutschmann Award of Excellence
- 2004- Harold L. Nelson Award
- 1994- Aubrey Fisher Mentorship Award
- 1989- AEJMC's Eleanor Blum Award for Distinguished service for research
- 1977- Chancellor's Award for Distinguished Service in Profession of Journalism

== Personal life ==
Guido Stempel married Anne and had two sons, Ralph and Carl, and a daughter, Jane Stempel Arata, along with three grandchildren, Alex and Derrick Stempel, and Chelsea Arata.

== Retirement ==
Stempel retired in 2002 from his position as journalism professor at Ohio University. He continued to direct the university's Scripps Survey Research Center, and wrote articles for the Athens Messenger. An active church member, Stempel also served as a camp counselor in Pennsylvania.
