= E. W. Scripps School of Journalism =

School of Ohio University

Coordinates: 39°19′40″N 82°06′01″W

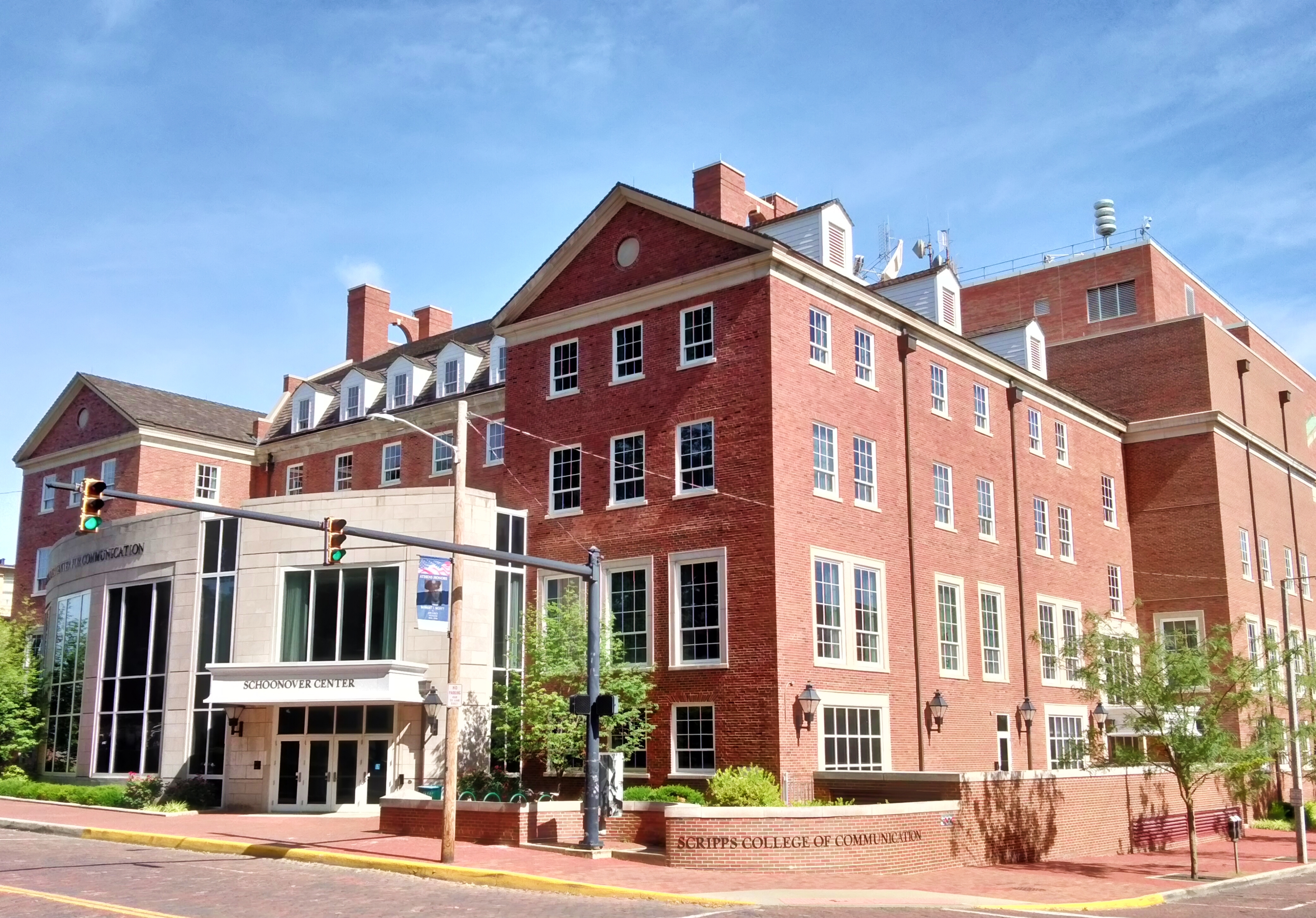
- Schoonover Center for Communication
- Type: Public
- Established: 1924
- Founders: George Starr Lasher
- Parent institution: Ohio University Scripps College of Communication
- Affiliations: WOUB (WOUB (AM), WOUB-FM, WOUB-TV)
- President: Lori Stewart Gonzalez
- Dean: Eddith Dashiell
- Associate Directors: Dr. Hans Meyer (undergraduate), Dr. Aimee Edmonson (graduate)
- Academic staff: 30+
- Students: 820 (approximate)
- Location: Schoonover Center, 1 Ohio University, Athens, Ohio, USA
- Campus: small city
- Buildings: Schoonover Center, Scripps Hall, Sing Tao Center, Radio-Television (RTV), WOUB Building
- Website: www.ohio.edu/scripps-college/journalism

The E. W. Scripps School of Journalism is the namesake school of the Scripps College of Communication at Ohio University seated in the Schoonover Center for Communication. Founded in 1924, the school has been recognized by the Associated Press and U.S. News & World Report for excellence in instruction and research in the fields of journalism and mass communications. The program has attracted more than $54 million in grants, awards, and investments. The School of Journalism is accredited by the Association for Education in Journalism and Mass Communication.

In 2013, the school relocated into the former Baker University Center building which was renovated to be the centerpiece of the Scripps College of Communication. The refurbished building features the latest in comms instruction technology and is designed in the form of a large news agency. The school's current director as of March 2020, Edith Dashiell, joined Ohio University in 1992.

== Degree Programs ==
=== Undergraduate ===
The new curriculum at the school features two tracks in the Bachelor of Science, Journalism degree:

- News & Information, which combines the previous sequences of Broadcast News, Magazine Journalism, News Writing and Editing, and Online Journalism.
- Strategic Communication, which combines the previous sequences of Advertising and Public Relations.

Each track requires candidates to enroll in prerequisite journalism courses ("core" classes) and track-specific skills classes. Students, however, must also specialize in electives outside the school of journalism, and each student must complete an advisor-approved internship before graduating. Students may also build their own coursework through the "Carr Van Anda" Program.

=== Graduate ===
The school offers Master's of Science programs in Journalism and a PhD in Mass Communication. Many students work toward their PhD in mass communication with an emphasis in either Media Studies or Journalism. Scripps students often publish their work in academic journals or present papers at academic conferences, such as the annual convention of the Association for Education in Journalism and Mass Communication. In August 2014, seven graduate students are scheduled to present 11 papers at the AEJMC annual convention.

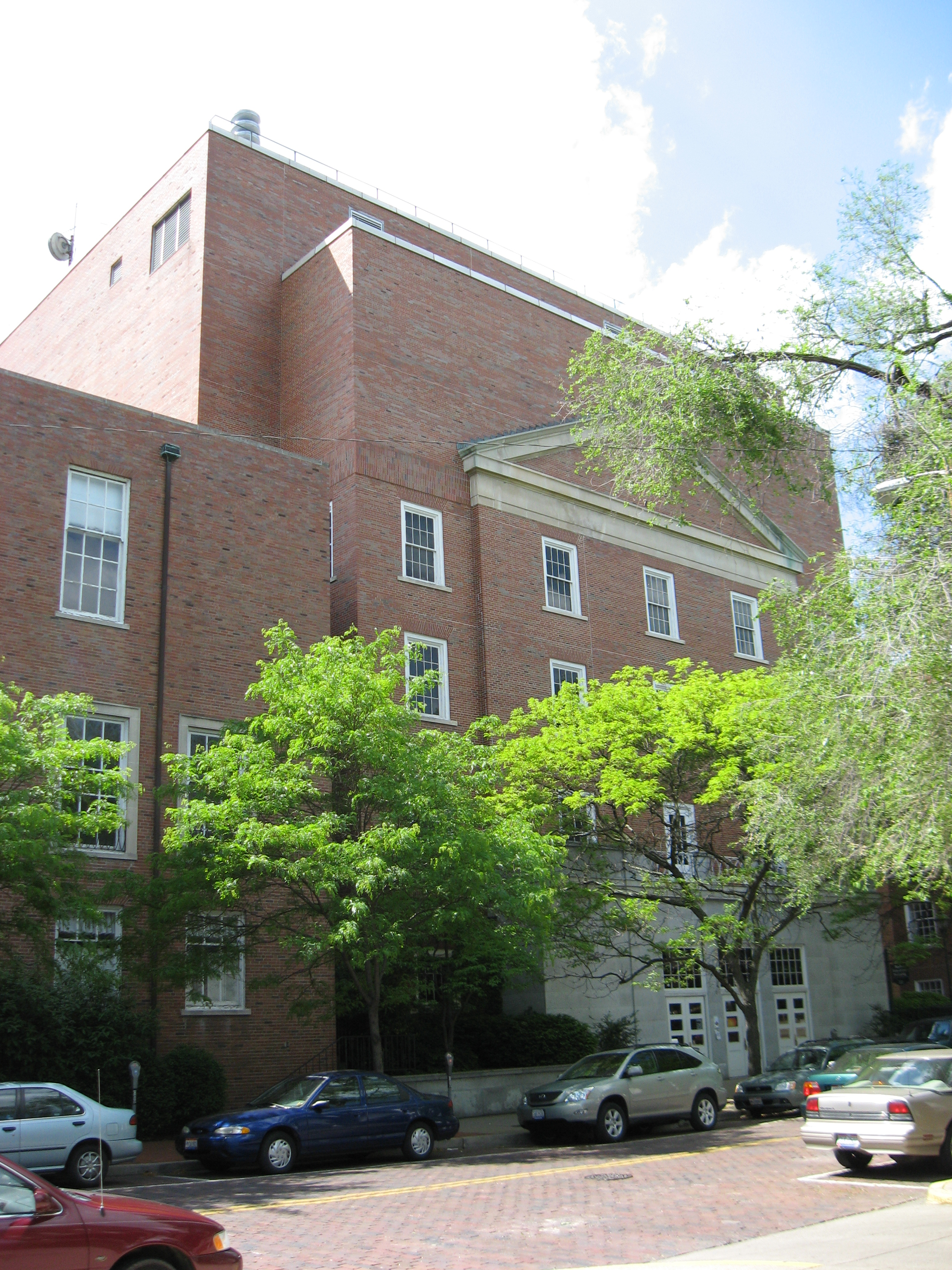
Home of WOUB, connected to the Scripps College of Communication Schoonover Center.

== Scripps Howard relationship ==
The E. W. Scripps School of Journalism, together with the Scripps College of Communication, is funded in part by numerous grants from the Scripps Howard Foundation. To date, the foundation has given approximately $20 million in funding to Ohio University's communication programs. The foundation also funds the Scripps Howard Visiting Professionals program, which brings in well-known journalists to teach at the school. Recent visiting professionals have included Pulitzer Prize-winning Chicago Tribune columnist Julia Keller, Pulitzer Prize-winning Miami Herald columnist Leonard Pitts, former The New York Times editor Mark Prendergast, former Forbes magazine senior editor Mark Tatge and former Associated Press Beirut bureau chief Terry Anderson. Notable alumni include NFL journalist Peter King of Sports Illustrated, Clarence Page of the Chicago Tribune, Andy Alexander of The Washington Post, and Laura Landro of The Wall Street Journal.

== Associated institutes and organizations ==
The Scripps School has a close relationship with the College of Arts & Sciences and specifically the English Department which offers a variety of writing and rhetoric classes. The Schoonover Center for Communication houses the School of Journalism faculty suite, Lasher Learning Center, two research labs, the Scripps College Survey Center, the Scripps Survey Research Center, co-founded by Distinguished Professor Guido Stempel and Thomas K. Hargrove, as well as other schools in the Scripps College of Communication. The Institute for International Journalism is located within the E. W. Scripps School of Journalism, and is currently headed by Yusuf Kalyango, an associate professor in the school. The institute administers the John R. Wilhelm foreign correspondence program, which has placed more than 250 students with international internships in 30 countries since 1970. Many journalism students work for the independently run campus newspaper, The Post, and WOUB-TV and Radio. The online radio station, All Campus Radio Network (ACRN), is another popular option for journalists. Many students are also an active part of the city of Athens' main newspapers Athens Messenger and The Athens News as well as several student-run media, including Speakeasy Mag, a student-produced online magazine with more than 100 staff members, Backdrop (magazine), a quarterly arts and culture magazine, and Thread, the university's only fashion magazine.

== Notable alumni ==
- Clarence Page, Pulitzer Prize winning Chicago Tribune columnist
- Jay Mariotti, sports columnist and TV personality
- Adam Hochberg, radio correspondent - NPR
- John Kaplan, Pulitzer Prize–winning photo-journalist, Life Magazine
- Donal Henahan, worked for The New York Times and won a Pulitzer Prize in 1986 for music criticism
- June Kronholz 2002 Pulitzer Prize winner for Wall Street Journal coverage of September 11
- Peter King four-time Associated Press Sports Editors award winner who also covers the NFL for NBC Sports
- Martin Savidge CNN anchor/national correspondent
- Michel du Cille two-time Pulitzer Prize-winning photographer for The Miami Herald
- Allie LaForce, reporter and anchor CBS Sports
- Wesley Lowery, Pulitzer Prize winning journalist, The Washington Post

== See also ==
- History of Ohio University
- List of Ohio University alumni
- List of Ohio University faculty
- Ohio University College of Arts and Sciences
