= Mount Pleasant High School (Delaware) =

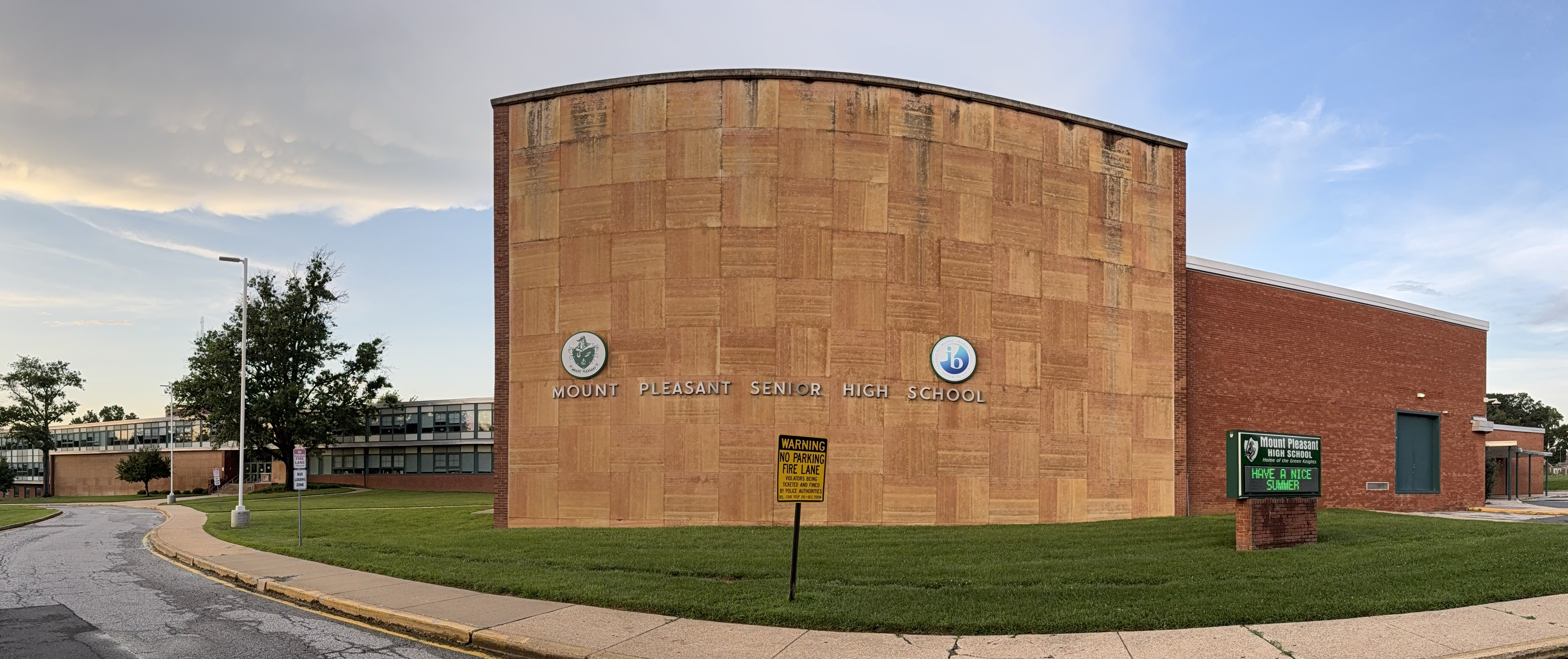

Location
- 5201 Washington Street; Wilmington postal address, Delaware 19809; United States; 39°46′21″N 75°30′17″W

Information
- Type: Public
- Motto: Mount P.R.I.D.E.
- Established: 1830 (196 years ago)
- School district: Brandywine School District
- CEEB code: 080180
- NCES School ID: 100124000246
- Principal: Evanthia Filiou (2025-present)
- Teaching staff: 72.10 FTEs
- Grades: 9—12
- Enrollment: 1,074 (as of 2023–2024)
- Student to teacher ratio: 14.90
- Colors: Green and white
- Athletics conference: Blue Hen Conference - Flight A
- Mascot: Green Knights
- Nickname: Mount, MPHS
- Rival: Concord High School, Brandywine High School
- Yearbook: The Green Leaf
- Website: mphs.brandywineschools.org

Mount Pleasant High School (MPHS) is a public secondary school located in unincorporated New Castle County, Delaware, United States. MPHS was the first public high school in Delaware to offer the International Baccalaureate program.

As of the 2022–2023 school year, the school had an enrollment of 1,107 students and 77.10 classroom teachers (on an FTE basis), for a student–teacher ratio of 14.36.

Communities in the school's attendance boundary include Arden, Ardencroft, almost all of Ardentown, Bellefonte, most of Edgemoor census-designated place, parts of Claymont CDP, and parts of the City of Wilmington.

== History ==
After Delaware passed the Free School Act in 1829, the state began pulling together their first public school system; the first school in Mount Pleasant, located in School District #2, was built soon after. The original schoolhouse still stands today and is located on an acre of land now part of Bellevue State Park. The community continued to grow and required a larger school, so in 1865, a new building was built near Mount Pleasant Methodist Church. This new school taught grades one through eight and gradually added nine through twelve as the students aged.

In 1932, they required even more space; what is now Mount Pleasant Elementary School was built to accommodate the still-growing population and named the Mount Pleasant School. However, only grades one through nine were offered. By 1947, enough families had moved into the area that a separate four-year high school had become a necessity, so Mount Pleasant School transitioned into Mount Pleasant Senior High School and the lower grades were split between Silverside and Edgemoore Elementary Schools. Construction of a new high school building began in 1953 and, in September 1958, MPHS moved to its current location on Washington.

The school celebrated its 175th anniversary in a series of events during homecoming weekend, October 14 and 15, 2005, including the inaugural Mount Pleasant Hall of Fame.

== Academics ==
In 2021, U.S. News & World Report ranked MPHS #2,885 of more than 24,000 high schools nationally.

MPHS' graduation rate for the 2018–2019 academic year was 90%.

== Athletics ==
MPHS competes in the Blue Hen Conference, Flight A.

== Activities ==
Mount Pleasant is home to WMPH 91.7 FM, which began broadcasting on October 1, 1969, and was Delaware's only public high school radio station until Thomas McKean High School began broadcasting at WHMS 88.1 FM in 1998.

In 2023, Mount Pleasants' theatre department won exclusive rights in Delaware to perform Frozen as performed on Broadway. This was a result of the "United States of Frozen" competition, which granted one high school in each state the materials to perform the show for the first time.

== Notable alumni ==
- Bang Bang (born 1985), celebrity tattoo artist
- Patricia Blevins (1954–2026), former member and President pro tempore of the Delaware Senate
- John Dossett (born 1958), actor and singer
- Vicki Hirsch (died 2010), theater actress and educator
- Kathy Jennings (born 1952), lawyer and the Attorney General of Delaware since 2019
- John Kaplan (b. 1959), Pulitzer Prize-winning photographer
- Dottie Leonard Miller (born 1945), business executive specializing in Christian music
- Julie Schumacher (born 1958), Thurber prize winning author of Dear Committee Members
- Seth Van Neerden (born 1968), former competitive swimmer and 1995 Pan American gold medalist
