= Speakeasy Mag =

The Speakeasy Logo

Speakeasy Mag is a Web magazine published by the E. W. Scripps School of Journalism at Ohio University. The magazine focuses on campus culture and the Athens, Ohio, social scene.

The magazine was founded in 2005 when a group of students realized that a new media outlet was needed on campus for students interested in New Media. In May 2009 the magazine updated its site's appearance to appeal more to its audience. Another update occurred in 2012, including a new URL. Staff members include students from the E.W. Scripps School of Journalism, Scripps College of Communication, and other majors at OU.

Founders include Cara McCoy, Caren Baginski and Katie Schmitt.
