= Marilyn Johnson (author) =

American writer

Marilyn Johnson is an American writer (b. 1954) and the author of the nonfiction books Lives in Ruins: Archaeologists and the Seductive Lure of Human Rubble (Harper, 2014); This Book Is Overdue! How Librarians and Cybrarians Can Save Us All (Harper Perennial, 2011); and The Dead Beat: Lost Souls, Lucky Stiffs, and the Perverse Pleasures of Obituaries (Harper Perennial, 2007)—three professions that Johnson says “contribute immeasurably to our collective cultural memory,” and “are less a job than a passionate calling.” Publishers Weekly called Johnson “dangerously good at what she does. By dangerously, I mean drop-what-you're-doing-start-a-new-career-path good,” and named Lives in Ruins one of the 100 best books of 2014.

== Professional ==
Johnson has a B.A. from the University of Pennsylvania. She studied with poet Charles Simic at the University of New Hampshire, then began working for fiction editor Rust Hills at Esquire in 1978. She edited articles at Esquire, Redbook, and Outside, and was a staff writer for Life, where she wrote profiles and obituaries of celebrities, including Diana, Princess of Wales. In 2015, she wrote the Smithsonian’s story about the excavation of four leaders of Jamestown Colony.

Johnson’s first book, The Dead Beat, “explores the world of obituaries—both the journalists who write them and the readers who love them.” The New York Times Book Review called it “[A] fascinating book about the art, history, and subculture of obituary writing” and singled out its chapters on obituary fans and readers as “downright amazing.”

This Book Is Overdue!, Johnson's second book, looked at the field of librarianship as it responded and adapted to the digital age with creativity, humor, and occasionally, panic. It received a Washington Irving Book Award, as did The Dead Beat. Library Journal called it a “kaleidoscopic” book “by a non-librarian [that] captures the breathtaking transformations in the field in recent years,” and noted that her subjects ranged from digital cataloging and collections to savvy young urban librarians and the Connecticut Four, who challenged the Patriot Act. The book was embraced by librarians and Johnson subsequently spoke on the importance of librarians and libraries in the digital age at library conferences across the U.S. She is a founding member of Authors for Libraries, which is affiliated with the American Library Association.

In her 2014 book, Lives in Ruins, Johnson “captures the vivid and quirky characters drawn to archaeology.” She writes about contemporary archaeologists in the context of their work in the field in the Caribbean, the Mediterranean, Machu Picchu, Australia, Asia, the U.K., Africa, the Pine Barrens of New Jersey, and multiple other stateside locations. Nature called it a “gem of hands-on reportage,” and archaeologists confirmed it as an accurate portrait of the profession, particularly with respect to the scarcity of paying jobs and the challenges of preservation in a dynamic world.

== Personal life ==
Johnson has three children with her husband, editor Rob Fleder. Johnson is a former fellow at the Purchase College Writers Center and has also published poetry as Marilyn A. Johnson. She lives in the Hudson Valley in New York.

== Books ==
- Lives in Ruins: Archaeologists and the Seductive Lure of Human Rubble (2014, Harper); (ISBN 978-0062127181)
- This Book Is Overdue! How Librarians and Cybrarians Can Save Us All (2011, Harper Perennial); (ISBN 978-0061431616)
- The Dead Beat: Lost Souls, Lucky Stiffs, and the Perverse Pleasures of Obituaries (2007, Harper Perennial); (ISBN 978-0060758769)
