= Tutorial system =

Teaching method in university education

The tutorial system is a method of university education where the main teaching method is regular, very small group sessions. These are the core teaching sessions of a degree, and are supplemented by lectures, practicals and larger group classes. This system is found at the collegiate universities of Oxford and Cambridge, although other universities use this method to various degrees.

== Oxbridge ==
The Oxbridge tutorial system was established in the 1800s at the University of Oxford and the University of Cambridge in the United Kingdom. It is still practised today, and consists of undergraduate students being taught by college fellows, or sometimes doctoral students and post-docs) in groups of one to three on a weekly basis. These sessions are called "tutorials" at Oxford and "supervisions" at Cambridge, and are the central method of teaching at those universities. The student is required to undertake preparatory work for each tutorial: for example, reading, essays or working through problems, depending on their subject. Other teaching sessions such as lectures, practicals and language classes are offered, but these are in addition to the compulsory tutorials.

At Oxbridge, tutorials/supervisions are the central element of the teaching, as opposed to lectures, seminars or larger group teaching. During each tutorial session, students are expected to orally communicate, defend, analyse, and critique the ideas of others as well as their own in conversations with the tutor and fellow students. It has been argued that the tutorial system has great value as a pedagogic model because it creates learning and assessment opportunities which are highly authentic and difficult to fake.

== Outside Oxbridge ==
In addition to the University of Cambridge and the University of Oxford, other universities also claim to practise this system, though on a less intensive basis and one that is less central to the overall structure of the course. The University of Buckingham, England's first private university founded in the 1970s, also practises the weekly tutorial system although in larger groups of six students.

Outside the United Kingdom, other universities have a tutorial system influenced by the Oxbridge system. Some examples are Omega Graduate School in Dayton, Tennessee, Williams College in Williamstown, Massachusetts, Honors Tutorial College at Ohio University in Athens, Ohio, Sarah Lawrence College in Yonkers, New York, New College of Florida in Sarasota, Florida, and the Bachelor of Arts with a major in Liberal Studies at Capilano University in North Vancouver, Canada. In France, the system of Classe préparatoire aux grandes écoles has a similar system of weekly oral examinations, called khôlles, by groups of two or three. In the Netherlands, the educational approach of Maastricht University in Maastricht is based on student-led tutorials in a Problem-Based-Learning setting.

Some universities use the name tutorial for teaching sessions or pastoral support meetings. These are additional parts of a student's education, rather than its core feature.
