= Dottie Leonard Miller =

American business executive (1945–2024)

Dorothy Leonard Miller
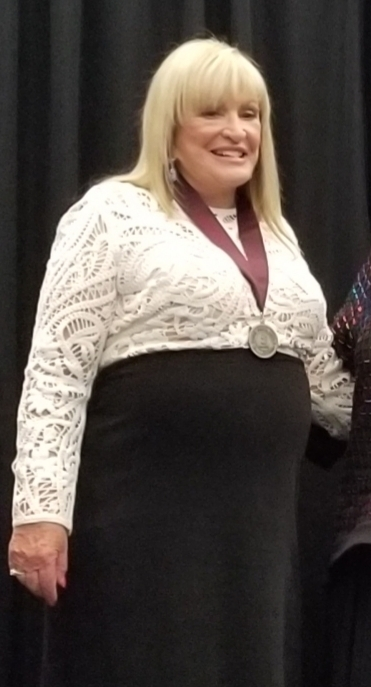
- Leonard Miller in 2019
- Born: Dorothy Virginia Golt; August 10, 1945; Wilmington, Delaware, U.S.
- Died: October 11, 2024 (aged 79); Hendersonville, Tennessee, U.S.
- Spouses: Edward Orem Leonard Sr. (m. 1964; died 1986) Joseph Kimbro (m. 1976) Jere Thomas Miller Sr. (m. 1990)

Dorothy Golt Leonard Miller (born Dorothy Virginia Golt; August 10, 1945 – October 11, 2024) was an American business executive who headed companies that specialized in Christian music and other Christian products. She was a member of the Gospel Music Hall of Fame and the Southern Gospel Music Hall of Fame.

== Early life and education ==
A native of Wilmington, Delaware, Dorothy was the daughter of William M. Golt and Dorothy Golt. She graduated from Mount Pleasant High School in 1963.

== Career ==
Dorothy began her Christian and Gospel music career as a receptionist, radio promoter, and salesperson for Calvary Records and Windchime Records.

In 1981, helped by a modest investment by family members and a friend, Dorothy launched New Day Christian Distributors in her garage. Over time, the company added books, clothing, games, gifts, and toys and became "a major source of distribution for the Christian retail market." Recording labels distributed by New Day include Fuel, Daywind, Malaco, Reach, Tooth and Nail, Gotee, Fair Trade, GoDigiPath, Tyscot, Lunjeal, and Word/Curb.

In 1986, Dorothy and Ronnie Drake created Daywind Music Group, which comprises Daywind Music Publishing, Daywind Performance Tracks, Daywind Records, and Daywind Studios. Described in the trade publication Billboard as "one of the most successful companies in the Christian market", the company has released more than 5,500 performance soundtracks, 500 albums, and many print music pieces. Artists whose music has been supported by Daywind include The Blackwood Brothers, Brian Free and Assurance, Gold City, Mark Lowry, Crabb Family, Karen Peck and New River, Perrys, Legacy Five, Greater Vision, Wilburn and Wilburn, LeFevre Quart, The Sound, HighRoad, Tim Menzies, Jason Crabb, Joseph Habedank, Triumphant Quartet, The Lewis Family and The Nelons. Daywind began producing the Live at Oak Tree and "Live at Daywind" series of DVDs of Christian performers, with the format derived from Miller's appreciation of music videos. The video recordings were featured on FamilyNet, Gospel Music Channel, and Inspo Network.

In 1990, Dorothy created Daywind Music Publishing, one of the top publishers in Christian music with a songwriter roster of 16 including Jason Cox, Gerald Crabb, Lee Black, Sue C. Smith, Karen Peck Gooch, Devin McGlamery, Bill Whyte, Dianne Wilkinson, and many more.

Dorothy established Music Source Direct as a short-run duplication facility, and owned two recording studios.

Dorothy is one of the only female business executives to have been inducted into the GMA Gospel Music Hall of Fame, as well as the SGMA Southern Gospel Hall of Fame.

== Death ==
Miller died in Hendersonville, Tennessee on October 11, 2024, at the age of 79.

== Recognition ==
Honors given to Dorothy include the following:

- 2005 Lifetime Achievement Award from the Southern Gospel Music Guild.
- 2013 Gospel Music Association's Lifetime Achievement Award.
- 2019 Induction into the Gospel Music Hall of Fame
- 2020 Induction into the Southern Gospel Music Hall of Fame.
- 2023 BMI Spotlight Award Recipient.
