= Emma Gamboa Alvarado =

Costa Rican educator

- Born: October 17, 1901; San Ramón, Costa Rica
- Died: December 10, 1976 (aged 75); Heredia, Costa Rica
- Education: Universidad de Costa Rica, Ohio State University

Emma Gamboa Alvarado (October 17, 1901 – December 10, 1976), was a Costa Rican educator, recognized for her contributions to pedagogy and teaching. She was declared Benemérita de la Patria (Well-deserving of the Homeland) by the Legislative Assembly of Costa Rica in 1980. She was depicted on the ten thousand colones bill of 1998.

== Early life ==
Her parents were José Gamboa and María Alvarado.

As a child, she excelled in school for her speed in reading comprehension, and her ability to easily do mathematics, but not in other subjects. She possessed a fondness for reading. Originally from a family with marked economic limitations, her mother requested a scholarship for her to start her secondary education at the recently founded Escuela Normal de Costa Rica.

== Education ==
She graduated as a teacher from the Escuela Normal in 1920. She continued her studies at Ohio State University in the United States, where she obtained a bachelor's degree in Education Sciences in 1939, Master of Arts in 1940, and Doctor of Philosophy in 1951.

== Career ==
In 1942, she joined the Asociación Nacional de Educadores (National Association of Educators) as a founding member, and five years later was chosen as the second president of this association. In 1947, she was appointed Dean by the Council Adviser of the Pedagogy Faculty.

When Otilio Ulate Blanco assumed the presidency of the Republic in 1949, after the Civil War of 1948, Emma Gamboa was designated as the Vice-minister of Education (ad honorem) and, in 1953, took the place of the minister for three months.

In 1958, she inaugurated the Education building at the University of Costa Rica, which was a product of her persistent efforts. In 1960, she contributed to the creation of the Escuela Nueva Laboratorio (primary laboratory), arranging an agreement between the University of Costa Rica and the Ministry of Public Education. She presented her ideals in didactic books, active readings, talks and advice seminars, and in national, Latin American, European and American conferences.

In favor of an integral and democratic education, she advocated for the dignity of the people, and the use of their experiences and the development of their creative faculties. She published several articles and technical works that contributed new methods of education for Costa Rican children. Nevertheless, her most disseminated works have been the textbooks widely used in Costa Rica, such as My home and my Village, Active Reading, Paco and Lola and The Little House on the Mountain.

== Benemérita de la Patria (Well-deserving of the Homeland) ==
Gamboa died on December 10, 1976, in the city of Heredia after a long fight against cancer. In 1980, the Legislative Assembly of Costa Rica declared her a Benemérita de la Patria (Well-deserving of the Homeland).

== Ten thousand colones bill ==
The Central Bank of Costa Rica decided to include her effigy on the ten thousand colones bill in 1998, being the first time in the history of the bank that a product gave recognition to women's contributions in the country's development. The design on the bill was made by a graphic arts student from the University of Costa Rica, Moral Frame Salazar.

== Publications ==
- El nuevo silabario (1937).
- La función de la educación de acuerdo con la naturaleza del hombre (1946).
- Educación primaria en Costa Rica (1952).
- John Dewey y la filosofía de la libertad (1958).
- Defensa de la escuela de educación de la Universidad (1960).
- Omar Dengo (1964).
- El pensamiento político de Omar Dengo (1969).
- Educación en una sociedad libre (1976).
- Flor de Infancia (1978) (Posthumous).
