= John M. Schlichter =

American politician

Member of the Ohio House of Representatives from the 85th district
- In office January 3, 2003-December 31, 2008
- Preceded by: Joseph P. Sulzer
- Succeeded by: Raymond Pryor

Personal details
- Party: Republican

John M. Schlichter (June 10, 1958 - November 19, 2020) was an American politician of the Republican Party who held a seat in the Ohio House of Representatives. He was from Washington Court House, Ohio.

In 2002, Schlichter won a seat in the House of Representatives by defeating sitting incumbent Joe Sulzer. He won re-election in 2004.

In 2008, Schlichter lost to Raymond Pryor.
