= Alfred Bartles =

American composer and musician (1930–2006)

- Born: November 10, 1930; Nashville, Tennessee
- Died: December 28, 2006 (aged 76); Nashville, Tennessee
- Era: 20th century

Alfred Howell Bartles (November 10, 1930 – December 28, 2006) was an American composer and musician. He played the cello and piano and he is best known for Music for Symphony Orchestra and Jazz Ensemble, a work that has been described as pioneering of the crossover between jazz and classical music.

Bartles grew up in Nashville, Tennessee, and studied piano under Lennie Tristano. He enrolled at Vanderbilt University in 1949 with the intention of studying music, but left at the start of the Korean War, to act as an arranger and pianist for the US Army. He obtained a master's degree in composition from Ohio University, under the direction of Karl Ahrendt, and began studying the cello. He joined the St. Louis Symphony Orchestra, and played in the pit orchestra on Broadway musicals. His compositions began to be published in the 1960s, including Music for Symphony Orchestra and Jazz Ensemble. In 1973, he accepted a position at Tennessee Technological University before moving to the Eurythmeum in Stuttgart, Germany, in 1977. He moved back to Nashville in 1997, where he spent the remainder of his career.

== Early life ==
Alfred Howell Bartles was born to Paul and Martha Howell Bartles on November 10, 1930, and was raised in Nashville. When Alfred was five years old his father died from the after-effects of poison gas in World War I, so he and his mother lived with his mother's younger sister, Isabel Howell, who helped to raise him. Alfred was raised in a family where both parents and grandparents had been musical. He showed talent at a young age with music, especially with piano. He would help the family with the income, doing low wage band jobs before being able to be a part of a musician union.

== Composing career ==
After spending summer of 1949 studying with Lennie Tristano, Bartles went to Vanderbilt University in the fall of 1949 wanting to get a premedical curriculum at first. However, he later transferred to Peabody College, to begin his studies in composition. During the Korean war, there was an Army Reserve Band in which Bartles played for and was called out of, for active duty. It later led to him transferring to University of Mississippi after the army.

At the University of Mississippi, he became interested in the cello as an instrument to take up despite not knowing much about it. Because of his musical past and devotion towards it, the learning curve was easier. Also while there he met Claus Adam, a cellist for the Juilliard String Quartet who would later become his mentor. At the University of Mississippi he met a piano student Martha Jean Smith. They married January 31, 1954, in the middle of their graduate studies at Ohio University (Athens Ohio). It was at Ohio University where Bartles studied composition with Karl Ahrendt and Roy Harris. Bartles received his master's degree in composition from Ohio University in 1954.

Alfred and Martha moved to New York City later that year where Bartles studied music theory with Felix Salzer at the Mannes School of Music. He was accepted by Claus Adam as cello student and studied works of cello pedagogues. He began a study with cellist Luigi Silva before his abrupt passing, where he used Silva's technique for cello playing. Bartles developed Silva's ideas in later years into his cello method compositions. After being in New York for a short time he joined the musicians union and started playing as a jazz pianist around the city. He taught private cello classes at the Rudolf Steiner School. He maintained cello work playing in orchestras for Broadway shows (Half a Sixpence), in places such as the Radio City Music Hall, in the Little Orchestra Society, Mantovani's orchestra, the Springfield Symphony Orchestra, and the St. Louis Symphony Orchestra. He even had a stint playing jazz cello in Charles Mingus' band. During this time, his daughters Isabel and Julia were born. As a jazz composer, Bartles co-wrote "Come Ride the Wind with Me" with lyricist Bryan Lindsay which was later recorded by Johnny Mathis.

In 1969, Bartles received a grant from a private foundation to study music teaching in Waldorf schools in Germany. In 1970 he began teaching at Schiller College in Bönnigheim, Germany, where he taught music history and theory and was a conductor. In 1973, they moved back to for teaching positions at Tennessee Technological University with Alfred at the cello and teaching music theory and Martha continuing with the piano. Here, Alfred played with the Nashville Symphony. In 1978, both Alfred and Martha got positions at the Eurythmeum in Stuttgart, Germany. Martha played for the Eurythmy troupe and Alfred taught music theory to the students while teaching some private cello as well. After four years, Alfred concentrated on only teaching cello with a position at the Musikschule Stuttgart. His wife Martha accepted a position at the Ludwigsburg University of Education. He remained in this position until his mandatory retirement in 1996. Martha retired in 1997.

They returned to Nashville and Alfred took on teaching positions at Murray State University and then at Tennessee Technological university again. He continued as a freelance cellist while developing his cello teaching materials and compositions. He died in Nashville on December 28, 2006, of colon cancer.

== Music and style ==
Bartles genre varied in style as he developed. He was considered a classical, jazz, and crossover composer. In later works he showed strengths in jazz more in writing and ensembles works for bands and orchestras as well as different works for cello. In the United States, he wrote several pieces for tuba and low brass (notably "When Tubas Walz") that he wrote at the request of Winston Morris, a friend of his. In Germany, he composed music for various eurythmy performances. Bartles has also been involved in arrangements and adaptions such as in 1985 where an orchestration of his for chamber orchestra of Alban Berg's Piano Sonata, Op. 1. was premiered by the Alban Berg Foundation at the Berg festival in Vienna, and later recorded by the Koechlin Ensemble. In 1988, he adapted the orchestration of Bartók's Cello Concerto to conform to Bartók's cello transcription of the work.

In 1994, he made two cello volumes and later adapted another piece of Bartók's for brass quintet, and wrote a Duo for Cello and Bassoon entitled "Three for Two". Later in 2002, he continued with his pedagogical compositions with jazz ensembles. He was working on a saxophone concerto at time of death. All his works and compositions were donated to Vanderbilt University in 2008.
