= Robert D. McCrie =

- Born: Canada
- Occupations: Academic, industry consultant and author

Academic background
- Education: B.A., Biology; M.S., Biology; M.A., History; M.Phil; Ph.D., Urban History
- Alma mater: Ohio Wesleyan University; University of Toledo; Hunter College; City University of New York

Academic work
- Institutions: City University of New York

Robert D. McCrie is an American academic, industry consultant, and an author. He is a professor at the John Jay College of Criminal Justice at the City University of New York, with his research focused on security management and prison reform.

McCrie is most known for his book Security Operations Management, which is in its 4th edition as of 2024. His research focuses on the history of corrections, police procedures, security management, and the history of crime and countermeasures, with research also focusing on prison reforms. His authored works include publications in academic journals, including International Journal of Offender Therapy and Comparative Criminology and Crime & Delinquency as well as books such as Readings in Security Management: Principles and Practices.

McCrie was also the founding editor in chief of the Security Journal 1989 to 1998.

== Education ==
McCrie earned a Bachelor of Arts in Biology from Ohio Wesleyan University in 1960, followed by an Master of Science in Biology from the University of Toledo. In 1992, he completed an Master of Arts in History from Hunter College and an Master of Philosophy from the CUNY Graduate School and University Center in 1993. Furthermore, he received his Doctor of Philosophy in Urban History from the same institution in 1995.

== Career ==
Prior to the commencement of his academic career, McCrie founded, published and edited a newsletter, Security Letter, and a controlled-circulation publication, Practical Psychology for Physicians (also known as Behavioral Medicine). He joined John Jay College of Criminal Justice at City University of New York as a faculty member in 1985 and became a full professor. From 1997 to 2003, he served as the chair of the Department of Law and Police Science at John Jay College. He was also the founding editor in chief of the Security Journal 1989 to 1998.

== Research ==
McCrie authored a multi edition book titled Security Operations Management. Its first edition, published in 2001 integrated business administration and criminal justice concepts into security management. In the following year, he authored the book Readings in Security Management: Principles and Practices. The book provided an overview of security management, covering topics such as legal issues, investigations, and information protection. Later in 2007, the 2nd edition of his book Security Operations Management was published. The book saw two additional editions in 2016 and 2022. The latest edition focused on security's critical role, risk management, and the latest technological advances.

In addition to books, McCrie has also published research papers. Through his 2017 study, he analyzed the inconsistencies in U.S. security services regulations, highlighting inadequate training and screening for security guards and reviewing varying state regulations for other security-related professions. Later in a paper published in 2022, he explored the failures of U.S. correctional practices in reducing recidivism. He studied prison operations in advanced economic nations including the potential of religious-ethical immersion programs. Along with his colleague, he examined a South Korean church-operated prison which achieved significantly lower recidivism rates as a promising alternative. In collaboration with Seungmug Lee, he also published a paper in the journal Crime & Delinquency. This study examined the impact of burglar alarms on burglary rates, finding that alarms significantly reduced burglaries without causing geographical displacement, while also providing protective benefits to neighboring houses.

== Awards and honors ==
- 2000 – Edgar B. Watson Award, National Association of Security Companies
- 2008 – Richter H. Moore Jr. Security and Crime Prevention Educator Award, Academy of Criminal Justice Sciences
- 2008 – Eugene R. Fink Memorial Award, Associated Licensed Detectives of New York State

== Bibliography ==
=== Books ===
- Readings in Security Management: Principles and Practices (2002) ISBN 9781887056182
- Security Operations Management (4th Edition) (2022) ISBN 9780128223710

=== Selected articles ===
- McCrie, R. D. (1988). The development of the US security industry. The Annals of the American Academy of Political and Social Science, 498(1), pages 23–33.
- McCrie, R. D. (2004). The history of expertise in security management practice and litigation. Security Journal, 17, pages 11–19.
- McCrie, R. D. (2023). Private Correction: The Delicate Balance. Privatizing Correctional Institutions, pages 19–32.
- Lee, S., & McCrie, R. D. (2023). Faith and fortitude: 10-year assessment of recidivism at a new church-based prison in South Korea. International journal of offender therapy and comparative criminology, 67(12), pages 1163–1192.
- Lee, S., & McCrie, R. D. (2024). The Bounty of Buffers: Spatial Measurement of Displacement and Diffusion of Benefits of Alarms on Burglary. Crime & Delinquency, 70(8), pages 1895–1920.
