= Roger Thurow =

American writer

Roger Thurow is an American author and a journalist. He is a former foreign correspondent for the Wall Street Journal. As of 2010, Thurow is a senior fellow for global agriculture and food policy for the Chicago Council on Global Affairs. He is noted for his writing about the politics of world hunger.

== Early life and education ==
Thurow grew up in Crystal Lake, Illinois and graduated from the University of Iowa in 1979.

== Career ==
For thirty years Thurow worked as a reporter for the Wall Street Journal, and for twenty of those years he was based abroad in Europe and Africa. After writing a series on famine in Africa, Thurow and Scott Kilman, fellow Wall Street Journal colleague, were finalists for the 2004 Pulitzer Prize in International Reporting. In 2009 Thurow and Kilman authored the book Enough: Why the World's Poorest Starve in an Age of Plenty. They received Action Against Hunger's Humanitarian Award for this book in 2009. Thurow's second book, The Last Hunger Season: A Year in an African Farm Community on the Brink of Change, was published in the spring of 2012.

Thurow also lectures on various topics about the world economy, and writes for the Huffington Post.

Thurow currently resides in a suburb of Chicago, Illinois with his wife and two children.
