= Mark Tatge =

American journalist (born 1965)

Mark W. Tatge
- Born: June 2, 1965 (age 61); Chicago, Illinois, U.S.
- Education: Ohio University (MBA); Ohio State University (MA-Journalism); Western Illinois University (BA-Sociology) University of Wisconsin - Madison (no degree)
- Occupation: Journalist

Mark W. Tatge (born June 2, 1965) is an American journalist, author, and college professor. He was a senior editor at Forbes magazine's Midwest Bureau, a staff reporter at The Wall Street Journal, an investigative reporter in the Statehouse Bureau of Cleveland's The Plain Dealer, and is the 2014 recipient of the Baldwin Fellowship at University of South Carolina.

Tatge taught journalism at DePauw University and Ohio University's E. W. Scripps School of Journalism and at University of South Carolina. He also worked as an adjunct professor at Northwestern University’s Medill School of Journalism, where he taught graduate journalism students about business, economics and finance.

In 2010, Tatge published his first book, The New York Times Reader: Business and Economics.

== Career ==
Tatge is a past Kiplinger Fellow in Public Affairs Reporting at Ohio State University where he completed his master's degree in journalism.

Tatge spent eight years as the Cleveland Plain Dealer's statehouse investigative reporter uncovering corruption in state government. Tatge's investigation into corruption at the Ohio Department of Insurance, entitled "Secrets of the Deal," was twice nominated for a Pulitzer Prize.

Tatge was awarded a visiting professorship at Ohio University endowed by the foundation established by the E.W. Scripps Co., beginning in 2008.

In 2011, Tatge was named Eugene S. Pulliam Distinguished Visiting Professor of Journalism at DePauw University.

In 2014, Tatge was awarded the Baldwin Business and Financial Graduate Fellowship at the University of South Carolina.

Tatge is the author of The New York Times Reader: Business and Economics,

In 2017, Tatge formed Deadline Media, a content production firm engaged in writing, editing and book publishing. The first book he wrote and published was "In One Era and Out the Other, The Saga of Bobby D." The book is a biography of Robert Ditmore, former president and chief operating officer of United Healthcare, now known as United Health Group, Inc.
