= Johan Lundström =

Swedish experimental psychologist

Dr. Johan N. Lundström (born 1973) is a Swedish biologist and psychologist.

He was awarded his Ph.D. in 2005 from Uppsala University and is most notable for his chemosensory work, and currently works at karalinska insetutet

His experiments involve the use of neuroimaging and testing of human behaviour. Johan Lundström's Group of the department of clinical neuroscience currently conduct basic research into the understanding of the neural and behavioural function of the olfactory system and how it interacts with other senses to understand our environment in health and disease.
