= Frank Marzullo =

American television meteorologist

Frank Marzullo is an AMS seal meteorologist who worked for WXIX-TV, the Fox network affiliate in Cincinnati, Ohio, from 2007 to 2025. On September 8, 2025 it was announced Marzullo would be joining WCPO as a co-anchor for "Good Morning Tri-State."
