= Andy Dolich =

American sports executive

Andrew Bruce Dolich is an American sports executive, and currently operates a sports consultancy, Dolich & Associates, in Los Altos, California. Dolich has more than five decades of experience in the professional sports industry, including executive positions in the NFL, NBA, NHL and MLB.

Dolich was born on February 18, 1947, in Brooklyn, New York. He graduated from Valley Stream South High School before receiving his undergraduate degree in government from American University in Washington D.C. Dolich then earned a master's degree in sports administration from Ohio University.

== 1970s ==
After earning his master's degree in 1971, Dolich worked for the NBA's Philadelphia 76ers as the administrative assistant to the general manager from 1971 to 1974. He created the “Year of the Uniform” merchandising program and also served as the team's promotional coordinator. The 76ers set an NBA record in 1972–73 going 9–73. This is the worst record in NBA History which stands to this day.

From 1974 to 1976, Dolich served as the business manager of the Maryland Arrows of the National Lacrosse League. At the time, the Arrows were a new franchise in a start-up professional league, and Dolich ran the business and marketing operations. While Dolich was in Maryland, the Arrows were among the league leaders in attendance.

Dolich then took his skills to the NHL, where he served as the director of marketing for the Washington Capitals from 1976 to 1978. With the Capitals, Dolich directed all aspects of the team's marketing and sales affairs. He also negotiated and optimized the team's relationships with radio and television rights holders.

At the end of the decade, Dolich tried his hand and succeeded in the professional soccer world. He was the executive vice president and general manager of the Washington Diplomats of the North American Soccer League. Dolich was with the Diplomats from 1978 to 1980, during which he ran the business and team aspects of the club. In his two-plus years, the team averaged more than 18,000 fans per game and Dolich created one of the league's premier marketing organizations.

== Oakland Athletics (1980–1994) ==
Dolich spent the next 15 years of his career with Major League Baseball's Oakland A's. When Dolich arrived in Oakland, the A's ranked last in attendance in the league and Dolich was charged with rejuvenating interest in the team. In his first 13 years, Dolich increased season ticket sales from 326 to 16,000 and attendance from 850,000 to 2.9 million.

Dolich was elevated to the position of executive vice president in 1993, and in this capacity he helped generate $58 million of annual revenue for the club. He was a member of the team's executive council that was charged by ownership with running the business operation on a daily basis, as well as the lead negotiator in both corporate sponsor and broadcasting contracts. During this time, Dolich established relationships with wide variety of community-based organizations in the Bay Area. He was the team spokesperson in all business and marketing related matters with media and served on Major League Baseball Properties Board of Directors.

Dolich's creative marketing campaigns, which included the now famous "Billy Ball" radio and TV ads, helped change the sports marketing landscape in the Bay Area.

While Dolich was in Oakland, the A's made three consecutive appearances in the World Series, including a sweep of the San Francisco Giants in 1989 to win the “Battle of the Bay” and the world championship.

== Life in California ==
After leaving the Athletics, Dolich spent one year as the President/COO of the NBA's Golden State Warriors, where he helped transition the team's management group to new ownership. He was responsible for the team's day-to-day operations, and repositioned the Warriors marketing, merchandising, community relations, game entertainment and arena operations.

In 1995, Dolich took a step out on his own and opened a company, Dolich & Associates. The Alameda, California, based group worked in the business development side of the sports and lifestyle entertainment industry, emphasizing strategic planning, management, marketing, sales, promotions, public relations and career counseling. Clients included: Nike, the Oakland A's, Seattle Mariners, San Jose Sharks, Questec, the 1994 U.S. World Cup, Cal Athletic Department, Stanford Athletic Department, Northern Virginia Baseball, Reno Air Races, Sun Microsystems, Cable Car Basketball Classic, America One, Ladies League Baseball, Ladbroke Racing and the Sacramento River Cats.

Then, from 1998 to 2000, Dolich worked as the executive vice president for Tickets.com in Costa Mesa, California. At Tickets.com, he was responsible for developing and implementing the company's multi-regional marketing and sales strategies.

== Ownership Bid (1999) ==
In 1999, Dolich partnered with Robert Piccinini in a bid to purchase the Oakland Athletics and build a new ballpark in Oakland. Then-Commissioner Bud Selig and other owners tabled a vote and the deal fell apart.

== Vancouver/Memphis Grizzlies (2000–2007) ==
On June 1, 2000, Dolich returned to the NBA to serve as the Memphis Grizzlies' president of business operations. Over the next seven years, Dolich was responsible for the Grizzlies day-to-day business operations. He planned strategic and tactical concepts to increase revenues and repositioned the Grizzlies marketing, advertising, merchandising, promotions, corporate marketing, public relations, community investment, game entertainment and broadcasting. He also was part of the team that planned the move to Memphis from Vancouver and built and managed the FedEx Forum, the Grizzlies world-class arena built in downtown Memphis.

During Dolich's time in Memphis, the team made its first three playoff appearances in franchise history. He established a season ticket base of more than 11,000 and sold out all 65 of the luxury suites.

== San Francisco 49ers (2008–2010) ==
In January 2008, Dolich joined the NFL's San Francisco 49ers as the club's chief operating officer and left that role in 2010. He was responsible for day-to-day business operations of the franchise including sales, marketing, public relations, corporate partnerships and facilities and worked with ownership on the planning for Levi's Stadium which opened in 2014.

== Dolich & Associates ==
In 2010, after leaving the San Francisco 49ers, Dolich opened his sports consultancy in Los Altos, California. Dolich & Associates offers counseling on property sales and marketing, along with event creation and executive search services. Clients include IMG College, West Coast Conference, FanlinQ, BCH99, TBT: The Basketball Tournament, Umpires Media, 4Front, 3Ball, and Bay Area Breeze.

== Selected work ==
- 20 Secrets to Success for NCAA Student Athletes Who Won’t Go Pro(Ohio University Press, 2018) ISBN 9780805094336

== Activities ==
- Sports Executive Leadership Council, 2009 – 2010 – Chairman
- San Francisco Convention & Visitors Bureau, Vice Chairman, 2009 – 2010
- Board of Directors, Memphis Grizzlies Foundation, 2002 – 2007
- Founder, Alameda Challenger Little League
- Founder, One Warm Shirt Project with St Anthony's Foundation and Comcast Sports- 2013–2020
- National Sports Forum Diversity Cohort Committee, 2013–2019
- Memphis Regional Chamber of Commerce board member 2003 – 2007
- NBA Marketing Advisory Board, 2001 – 2007
- San Jose Sports Authority – Board of Directors, 2009–2019
- Accelerate Sports- Advisory Board- Sacramento
- Navigate Marketing-Advisory Board- Chicago
- 4FRONT Business Advisor
- University of Central Florida-DeVos Sports Business Program-Advisory Board.
- Fan Compass Sports Advisory Council-SF
- Positive Coaching Alliance- Menlo Park, CA 2015–2019
- Northern California PGA Foundation Board of Directors

== Media ==
- Columnist, Comcast Sportsnet Bay Area website 2010–14
- Contributing Writer, Sports Business Journal, 2010–2018
- Comcast Sportsnet Bay Area TV-"Sports Business Insider"
- Contributing Writer for “The Ultimate Sports Guide”
- Current host at "Life in the Front Office", a podcast shining a light on how pro franchises and leagues operate from the inside out.

== Education ==
- 1. Director of Career Development, Collegiate Athletics Masters Program, University of San Francisco, 2014–2017
- 2. Instructor at Stanford's School of Continuing Studies in Sports Management 2010–12.
- 3. Woodard Teaching Fellow at Warsaw Sports Marketing Center at the University of Oregon 2006–2007.
- 4. Ohio University Sports Management Program Advisory Board 2007–2012.
- 5. Stanford School of Continuing Studies 2010–2020

== Awards and honors ==
- Ohio University Sports Management Program Alumnus of the Year-1982
- Who's Who in America, 1983 – 2019
- Committee- Bay Area Sports Hall of Fame, 1982–2012
- Valley Stream, New York- Hall of Fame
- CLIO Advertising Awards for Oakland A's "BillyBall" Campaign
- Sports Philanthropy Project, 2006 – Patterson Award Winner for Memphis Grizzlies.
- Northern California Jewish Sports Hall of Fame inductee-2014
