= Joe Sulzer =

American politician

Mayor of Chillicothe, Ohio
- In office 2007–2011
- Preceded by: Margaret Planton
- Succeeded by: Jack Everson

Member of the Ohio House of Representatives from the 91st district
- In office February 8, 1997 – December 31, 2002
- Preceded by: Mike Shoemaker
- Succeeded by: John M. Schlichter

Mayor of Chillicothe, Ohio
- In office 1987–1996
- Succeeded by: Margaret Planton

Personal details
- Party: Democratic
- Education: Ohio University; Capital University Law School (JD)

Joseph P. Sulzer is an American Democratic politician, and was mayor of Chillicothe, Ohio.

Sulzer served in the United States Army during the Vietnam War. He earned a bachelor's degree from Ohio University and was awarded a Juris Doctor degree by Capital University Law School.

Returning to Chillicothe, Sulzer was elected to the city council, where he served for six years. In 1987, Sulzer became mayor of Chillicothe.

In 1992, Sulzer entered the Democratic primary contest for the United States House of Representatives in Ohio's sixth congressional district. He lost that primary race to Ted Strickland.

Sulzer served as Chillicothe mayor until 1996. In 1997, Sulzer was appointed to fill out the term of a seat in the Ohio House of Representatives that had become vacant. While serving in the legislature, Chillicothe city council member Margaret Planton was appointed his successor as mayor. Sulzer won re-election to his Ohio House of Representatives seat in 1998 and 2000. However, in 2002, Sulzer was unseated by Republican John M. Schlichter.

In 2003, Sulzer again ran for the office of Chillicothe mayor. He won the Democratic primary. In the general election, he defeated city council member Diane Carnes, getting 55 percent of the vote.

In August 2005, Sulzer announced that he would run for the US House seat (OH-18) held by Republican Bob Ney. In March 2006, Sulzer called for Ney to step down if explicitly named by Jack Abramoff as someone guilty of corruption.

On May 2, 2006, Sulzer lost the primary election for the Democratic nomination in the Ohio 18th to attorney Zack Space. Space got 39% of the vote, Jennifer Stewart 25%, and Sulzer 24%.

In November 2007 Sulzer was re-elected to the office of Mayor in Chillicothe. He defeated former City Council-At-Large Diane Carnes in a crushing victory that helped win the local Democratic Party majority control of City Council with the election of new Council members.

In 2008, Sulzer controversially backed a measure that would install red-light cameras at several intersections in the city and the idea won passage in City Council. They were installed in October 2008, but city residents had them taken down after voting in a favor of a no-red light camera referendum in November 2009.

In 2010, Sulzer unsuccessfully campaigned for Judge of the Ross County Court of Common Pleas, losing to Mike Ater in a three-way race that also included Mark Preston. Sulzer finished third in the race with just 18 percent of the vote.

In 2011, he announced that he would retire from public service at the end of the year and his term as mayor. He is now a private practice attorney.
