= Simon Lundström =

Swedish translator (born 1973)

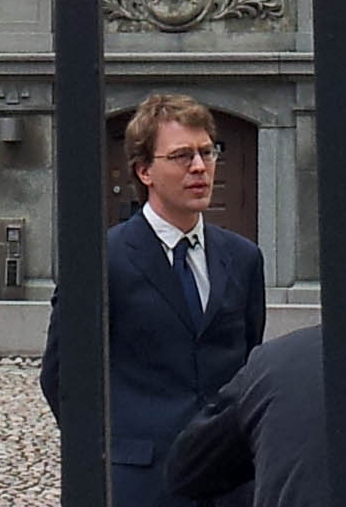
- Born: 1973 (age 52–53); Järfälla, Sweden
- Occupation: Translator

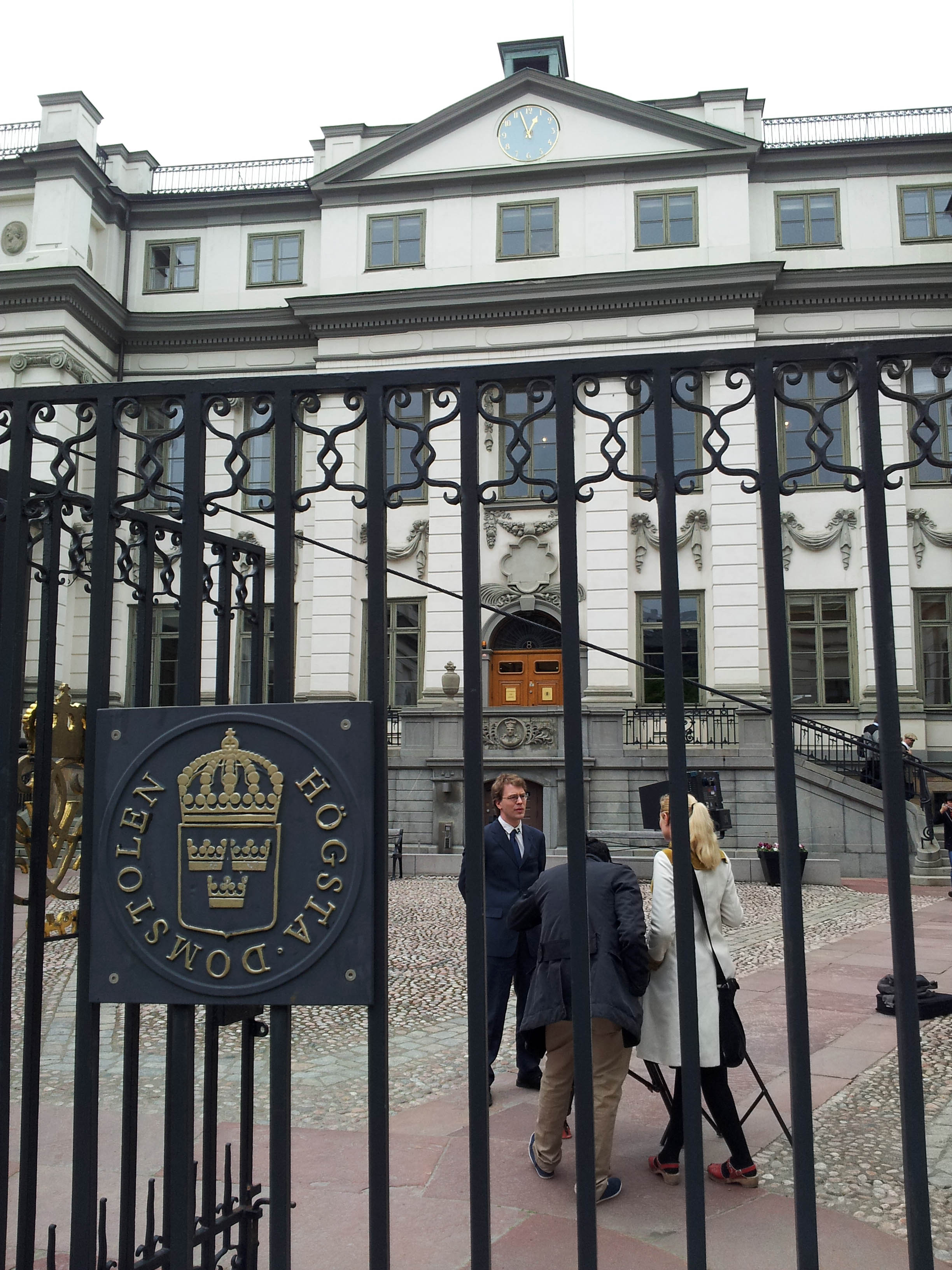
Siemon Lundstrom standing in front of the Supreme Court, May 16, 2012.

Simon Lundström (born 1973) is a Swedish manga translator.

== Overview ==
He has introduced many Japanese manga and anime to Sweden, and has translated various manga such as "Fullmetal Alchemist", "One Piece", "Naruto", "Detective Conan", "Ranma ½", and "Neon Genesis Evangelion".

In 2010, he was charged by the Swedish police with possession of child pornography for possessing cartoon images, but in 2012, the Swedish Supreme Court ruled that cartoon illustrations are not child pornography and acquitted him of the charge. This case is called as "Mangamålet".
