= W. Timothy Liu =

American meteorologist

W. Timothy Liu is an American meteorologist and atmospheric scientist. He became a Fellow of the American Meteorological Society in the year 2000, a Fellow of American Association for the Advancement of Science in 2007, and most recently an American Geophysical Union Fellow (2011). By the end of 2008 he had published 145 refereed journal articles or reviewed book chapters, and has authored over 260 publications in total.

== Education ==
W. Timothy Liu holds a M.S. (1974) and a Ph.D. (1978) in Atmospheric Sciences from the University of Washington. He received his Bachelor of Science, Summa Cum Laude, in Physics, from Ohio University, in Athens in 1971.

In 1970 he became a member of Sigma Pi Sigma, a member of Phi Beta Kappa in 1971, and a member of Sigma Xi in 1975.

== Selected professional accomplishments ==
W. Timothy Lius experience and expertise are in ocean-atmosphere interaction and application of space based observations.

He has been a principal investigator on studies concerning air-sea interaction and satellite oceanography since he joined JPL in 1979. He is currently a senior research scientist, the leader of the Air-sea Interaction and Climate Team, and the NSCAT Project Scientist.

He received the NASA Medal for Exceptional Scientific Achievement for his pioneering work in ocean surface heat flux, a NASA Group Achievement Award on Topex, and a number of NASA Certificates of Recognition.

Liu is also a principal investigator on both the NSCAT and TOPEX/Poseidon Projects. He has served on the Earth Science and Application Division Advisory Subcommittee and various science working groups of NASA. He has also served on numerous science working groups and advisory panels of the World Climate Research Program and editorial boards of scientific journals.

== Laboratory and field experiments ==
While a student at the University of Washington, Timothy Liu conducted both laboratory and field experiments to study inter-facial transport and turbulent transfer in the surface (constant flux) layer over the ocean. His postulation of the behavior of the moisture transfer coefficients, at low and high winds were unconventional at that time, and led later to the validation effort in the Humidity Exchange Over Sea (HEXOS) experiment and Tropical Ocean Global Atmosphere (TOGA)-Couple Ocean and Response Experiment (COARE) in the eighties and nineties. Its impact is still felt more than two decades later. His formulation of temperature profile and transport theory in the molecular sub-layer, which is based on gas transfer studies, are being used by the communities studying gas transfer and ocean skin layer today.

== Satellites oceanography ==
He developed the first credible method of using satellite data to estimate evaporation and latent heat flux in the early 1980s, and was one of the first scientists to use a combination of satellite sensors to study the global relation between surface thermal forcing and ocean temperature response. In the past two decade, a generation of scientists have been involved in the estimation of heat flux from space, based on his methodology. With a new generation of microwave radiometers and atmospheric sounders, he has just begun to lead a renewed effort again to retrieve evaporation directly from the radiance measured by space based microwave radiometer.

== JPL ==
Since he joined JPL, he has been selected to the science teams of numerous space missions, including NSCAT, QuikSCAT, Topex/Poseidon, JASON, TRMM, EOS, Aqua, ERS-1, AMSR, and Aquarius. He has made many innovative science applications of various combinations of these space based measurements. His present interest includes relating the fluxes to storage and transport through the depths of the ocean and atmosphere. He is leading research effort to combine a variety of satellite data synergistically to study global climate and environmental changes. He has recently made important advances in studying the water balance over global ocean and their influence on terrestrial and cryospheric water cycles, using a combination of space-based observations.

== Professional services ==
The following is an abridged list of his professional services.

- ISPRS Commission VII, Chairman of Work Group on Ocean 2008-2012
- JAXA GCOM-W Science Team 2008–present
- ISRO Oceansa-2 Science Team 2008–present
- ESA- EUMETSA TASCAT Science Advisory Group 2006–present
- US Atlantic Meridional Overturning Current Science Team 2008–present
- Pan-Oceanic Remote Sensing Conference Association, Treasurer, 2006 to present
- United Kingdom Natural Environment Research Council-Earth Observation Centres of
- Excellence Steering Committee 2003-2008
- NASA Global Water and Energy Research Initiative Working Group 2001
- Tropical Rain Measuring Mission Science Working Team, 1998–present.

== Other recognition ==
Liu has also received the following honors and awards:

- American Meteorological Society Verner E. Suomi Award (2010)
- Space Systems Award, American Institute of Aeronautics and Astronautics, (2006)
- Distinguished Science Award, Pan Oceanic Remote Sensing Conference Assoc. (2002)
- NASA Group Achievement Award, Satellite Ocean Atlas (2001)
- NASA Group Achievement Award, Quikscat Mission Team (2000)
- NASA Group Achievement Award, NSCAT Science Team (1998)
- NASA Exceptional Achievement Medal, Leadership in NSCAT Sciences Research (1998)
- NASA Group Achievement Award, NSCAT Management and Outreach (1997)
- Honorary Guest Professorship at China Ocean University (1996)
- NASA Group Achievement Award, Topex Verification (1994)
- NASA Group Achievement Award, Topex Mission Design (1993)
- NASA Certificates of Recognition, Hydrologic Balance and Greenhouse Warming (1993)
- NASA Certificates of Recognition, Remote Sensing of Turbulent Flux (1991)
- NASA Medal for Exceptional Scientific Achievement, Air-sea Interaction Processes (1990)
- NATO Fellowship to Advanced Study Institute on Air-Sea Interaction (1978)
