= They Went Thataway =

- Author: James Horwitz
- Publisher: Ballantine Books
- Publication date: 1976

They Went Thataway is a non-fiction book written by James Horwitz and published in 1976. It analyzes the Western film genre from a nostalgic, yet jaded point of view.

The book takes the form of a quest journey, with Horwitz using the idea of researching and locating the old western actors of the past for a writing project. However, Horwitz uses the journey as a way to reconnect with his much more innocent past, and wonders what happened to himself and the world around him.

The book carries a heavy anti-Establishment sense to its narration, with numerous references to Richard Nixon, Gerald Ford, as well as the just-concluded Vietnam War.

== Synopsis ==
Horwitz decides to travel to Hollywood and hunt down the surviving western heroes of his youth. As he drives across the country, he stops off at a variety of places that he had known only through western movie legends, only to find them too modernized. Upon arrival in Los Angeles, Horwitz contacts the Screen Actors Guild, which refuses to release the mailing addresses of the now-retired stars or even tell him who is alive or dead. He leaves his contact letters at the Guild office and places an ad in The Hollywood Reporter, asking for any of the actors willing to participate in the writing project to contact him. Through various means, Horwitz succeeds in tracking down and interviewing many western heroes, including Gene Autry, Sunset Carson, Joel McCrea, and Duncan Renaldo, AKA The Cisco Kid. Others, such as Jay Silverheels and Roy Rogers, reject him completely.

Throughout the book, Horwitz is repeatedly disillusioned by the reality behind the nostalgia, such as Lash LaRue being arrested for drunkenness and drug possession or Roy Rogers' horse Trigger stuffed and mounted in a museum.

Horwitz ends the book at the site where Tom Mix died in a car accident. He takes out his childhood cowboy boots, tries to polish them, and leaves them at the monument marking the location.

The book also contains a thorough analysis of the western movie genre, focusing primarily on the early cowboy film legends. Horwitz covers Hopalong Cassidy's career in detail.
