= Ray Pryor =

American politician

Raymond A. Pryor

Member of the Ohio House of Representatives from the 85th district
- In office January 5, 2009 - December 31, 2010
- Preceded by: John M. Schlichter
- Succeeded by: Bob Peterson

Personal details
- Born: December 26, 1954 Ross County, Ohio, U.S.
- Died: February 24, 2023 (age 68) Chillicothe, Ohio, U.S.
- Party: Democratic
- Education: Ohio University
- Profession: Veterans Services (formerly)
- Website: http://www.raypryor.org

Raymond A. Pryor (December 26, 1954 – February 24, 2023) was a Democratic member of the Ohio House of Representatives, who represented the 85th District from 2009 to 2010.

== Career ==
The Ross County native was a graduate of Ohio University – Chillicothe, who majored in Business Management Technology. He served six years in the U.S. Navy. Pryor worked for the Ohio Bureau of Employment Services for 25 years as a Veteran’s Representative and Veterans Licensing Coordinator. During his tenure, he helped develop a state licensing and certification program for Ohio veterans hailed as a national model. He is also a certified substitute teacher and an apprentice auctioneer.

Pryor, a former OCSEA Union President (Ross #7100), has worked to improve opportunity and attain energy independence in Southern Ohio. He helped establish the Southern Ohio Biomass Task Force, a group dedicated to promoting a biomass fuel initiative in southern and south central Ohio. The goal is to reduce dependence on oil and gas while helping schools and other facilities save on utility costs.

In 2006 Pryor ran for the Ohio House of Representatives against John M. Schlichter but lost by a very slim margin. He faced Schlichter again in 2008, and won. However, in 2010, Pryor again lost, this time to Bob Peterson. He spent one term as a state representative.

== Personal life ==
Pryor lived in Chillicothe with his wife Jennifer, a reading and math intervention teacher in the Huntington School District. His son Nicholas is a teacher in the Huntington School District (formerly a fifth-grade teacher at Unioto Local School District), and his wife Kaylyn also works in the Unioto School District and attends college full-time. Pryor's daughter, Leslie Smith, is a special needs preschool teacher, and son-in-law Chris is an instrument technician.

On February 24, 2023, Pryor died at the age of 68.
