= John Kaplan (photographer) =

American photographer

- Awards: Pulitzer Prize; Fulbright Scholar
- Scientific career
- Fields: Photography
- Workplaces: University of Florida

John Kaplan is an American photographer who won the 1992 Pulitzer Prize for Feature Photography "for his photographs depicting the diverse lifestyles of seven 21-year-olds across the United States".

Kaplan attended Mount Pleasant High School in Wilmington, Delaware, graduating in 1977. Kaplan graduated with a bachelor's degree in journalism from E. W. Scripps School of Journalism at Ohio University in 1982 and later graduated with a master's degree in journalism from the school in 1998. In 1999 he became a faculty member at the University of Florida's College of Journalism and Communications.

In April 2008 Kaplan was named a Fulbright Scholar. The same year, Kaplan was diagnosed with non-Hodgkin's lymphoma, a condition which is in remission as of 2011 after treatment. Kaplan has reported his experience with cancer in an award-winning documentary film entitled Not As I Pictured.
