= Kō Yamada =

Japanese photographer

- Born: 山田 亘 1964 (age 61–62); Nagoya, Aichi, Japan
- Education: Ohio University (B.A., M.F.A.), Athens, Ohio, USA
- Known for: Photography, Multimedia
- Website: http://www.umbilicalsites.com/

Kō Yamada (山田 亘, Yamada Kō; born 1964) is a Japanese photographer. He extensively experiments with multimedia formats, combining photography with sound installations, book projects, and live performances. His photography and art projects have been exhibited in Japan, Brazil, the United States, Germany, Thailand, and Malaysia.

== Career ==
He trained in the United States, earning both a bachelor's degree in photography (1990) and Master of Fine Arts (1993) from Ohio University. After he completed his university training, he taught briefly in the U.S. before returning to Japan. He has taught, as lecturer, at Nagoya University of Arts and Nagoya Zokei University of Art and Design After he worked for International Symposium on Electronic Arts (ISEA) 2002 as the vice secretary general, he also participated as the representative director of PAC (Photography Arts Caravan) for the International New Designers Workshop Nagoya 2009, which was a UNESCO project

== Awards, honors, and selected shows ==
He held a 1993 National Graduate Seminar Fellowship at The Photography Institute in New York. The following year, he won the Houston Center for Photography's emerging photographers fellowship. He was recognized at the 2nd International Photo Meeting in São Paulo, Brazil, before he had shows at Tokyo Metropolitan Museum of Photography.

== Published material ==
2003 記憶の星座化 The Constellating Recollections a book and performance workshop with poet Jin Murata (published by Kiokuno Seizaka)

n.d. 立体めがね Three Dimensional Spectacles with Iichiro Tanaka (published by Domic, ISBN 978-4-9900721-1-7)
