= Linden Lundstrom =

Linden J. Lundstrom (1913–1996) of Rockford, Illinois, was an American choral conductor, arranger, author, publisher, and founder of Kantorei – The Singing Boys of Rockford, IL. Lundstrom grew up in Rockford, leaving in the 1930s to attend St Olaf College, Northfield MN, where he was greatly influenced by F. Melius Christiansen, founder of the St Olaf Choir. Upon graduation with a music degree, he returned to Rockford and to his first job, as choral director at the newly built Rockford East High School (1939). He remained there for some 35 years, but this was only one segment of his choral music influence, particularly among students. He was music director at First Lutheran Church, and later Our Savior's Lutheran Church (beginning 1958). With former student, Ronald Nelson, he self-published choral arrangements and curricula under the name Choir School Guild. In addition, AugsburgFortress published Lundstrom's The Choir School: A Leadership Manual in 1957. Lundstrom did further academic work in music at the University of Wisconsin, Madison.

Lundstrom's first major contribution to the American choral scene was his adaptation of the European Choir School to the average American congregation. He studied at Union Theological Seminary (1949) and corresponded with choir master Ernst Suter in Germany, then conceived the idea of a Saturday morning program incorporating studies in worship, sight-singing and creative arts, as well as actual choir rehearsals. By beginning such training at a very young age, he hoped to achieve in some measure what the resident schools in Europe were accomplishing. His Choir Schools at First Lutheran Church and Our Savior's Lutheran in Rockford became models for such choir schools in many other parishes throughout the country, beginning with Tabor Lutheran in Rockford, Westwood Lutheran Church in St Louis Park, Minnesota, and House of Hope Church, St Paul, Minnesota.

Lundstrom's work also included the founding of an authentic boys' choir,Kantorei - The Singing Boys of Rockford in 1964. Based on his experience in Germany, he insisted that all four voices, soprano, alto, tenor, and bass be included, as opposed to the then-common American tradition of using treble voices only. A choir school supported the musical education and vocal development of young boys, who then matriculated into the main group. As voices changed, members moved from upper voices to lower voices within the group. The Kantorei tackled the most challenging music, including 8-part Bach motets, as well as a wealth of American traditional song. The choir continues today as the same non-profit, non-sectarian community group, travelling the world with the unique vocal sound only such a group may make.

Lundstrom retired to rural Wisconsin in the mid-1970s, working from his extensive home library (housed in a large barn) on choral music as well as other activities. In 1976, he organized a trek by rail, float-plane, and native canoe to a possible site on Hudson Bay where the explorer Henry Hudson may have spent a winter before the mutiny of his crew in 1611, marking the end of what we know about Hudson. A member of the Society for the History of Discoveries, Lundstrom wrote an essay, "The Bay Where Hudson did winter", which became part of a series of James Ford Bell Lectures published by the University of MN Library.

Lundstrom's influence continues, mainly through the many students he taught and conducted, including choral composer Ronnie Nelson, pipe organ builder and church musician, Tom Erickson, and many others.
