= Vilhelm Lundström =

Swedish scholar

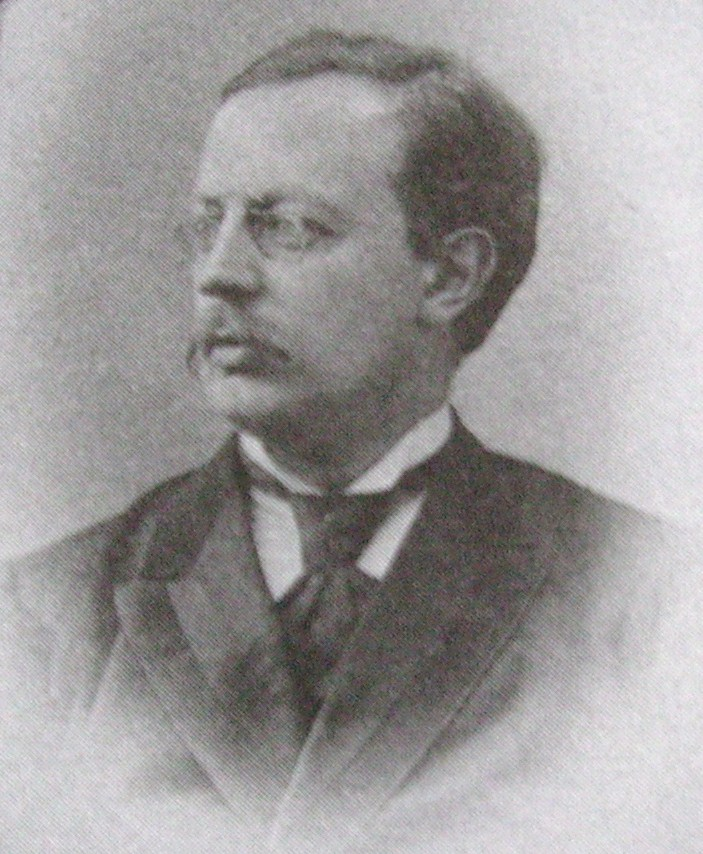
Vilhelm Lundström

Karl Johan Vilhelm Lundström (7 May 1869 – 20 March 1940) was a Swedish classical scholar, university professor and Member of Parliament. His wife was the editor Enni Lundström.

== Biography ==
Born in Sigtuna, Lundström enrolled in Uppsala University in 1886 and earned his doctorate in 1893. In the same year he became associate professor of Latin Language and Literature; in 1907 moved to University of Gothenburg to become Professor of Classical Languages (with teaching duties in Latin). Lundström made many scientific trips for palaeographic and archaeological studies to Russia, Germany, Austria and Italy. In 1930, he founded the first Swedish lectureship in Italian literature and language.

He was a prominent speaker and poet. In his speeches and poems he represented a national right-wing position.

He died in Gothenburg in 1940.

== Research activity ==
Influenced by Karl Krumbacher, Lundström successfully pursued Byzantine studies in parallel to classical scholarship. He was editor-in-chief of the Uppsala newspaper Fyris from November 1893 to December 1897, then of Göteborgs Aftonblad from 16 December 1901 to September 1906. He also wrote a large number of political and other articles in many different conservative newspapers and was a frequent contributor to several magazines. In 1896, he founded and edited the philological journal Eranos, in which he published some of his own Byzantine studies.

His major philological contribution was the edition of Columella he promoted, editing vols. I, II, VI and VII.

== Political activity ==
Lundström founded the Swedish Association for the Preservation of Swedishness Abroad in 1908 and became its first secretary. He left his position in 1923 for health reasons, but was later able to partially resume his very important activities for the association. In connection with this, he was editor of the magazine Allsvensk samling from 1919 to 1923 and succeeded in realising a Swedish section abroad at the Gothenburg Exhibition in 1923.

In 1911 he was elected to the Second Chamber of Parliament for the City of Gothenburg on behalf of the General Electoral Association and was a member until 1914, when he declined re-election. In the Riksdag he wrote two motions of his own and in 1912 he succeeded in getting a change in the law passed, which meant that a Swedish citizen could not lose his Swedish citizenship without his own will and knowledge.

Lundström edited the Svensk humanistisk tidskrift from 1917 to 1919 and in 1923 he published a study of Tacitus' poetic sources (in Göteborgs högskolas årsskrift). He was an honorary senator at the University of Rostock and received an honorary doctorate from the University of Padua. In 1924 Lundström was awarded the Karl Johan Prize by the Swedish Royal Academy for his work for the preservation of the Swedish language abroad. From 1927 to 1933 he was the editor of the journal Sverige-Italien.

Vilhelm Lundström's childhood home and later summer residence "Lundströmska gården" in Sigtuna was made a museum in 1958.

== Works (selection) ==
=== Books ===
- Critical edition of Columella:
  - Columella, L. Iunius Moderatus (1897). Lundström, Vilhelm (ed.). Opera quae supersunt. Vol. I: Liber de arboribus. Upsala – Leipzig: Lundeqvist – Otto Harrassowitz.
  - Columella, L. Iunius Moderatus (1902). Lundström, Vilhelm (ed.). Opera quae supersunt. Vol. VI: Rei rusticae liber X. Upsala – Leipzig: Lundeqvist – Otto Harrassowitz.
  - Columella, L. Iunius Moderatus (1906). Lundström, Vilhelm (ed.). Opera quae supersunt. Vol. VII: Rei rusticae liber XI. Upsala: K. W. Appelberg.
  - Columella, L. Iunius Moderatus (1917). Lundström, Vilhelm (ed.). Opera quae supersunt. Vol. II: Rei rusticae libri I et II. Gothenburg: Eranos Förlag.
- Laskaris Kananos (1902). Lundström, Vilhelm (ed.). Reseanteckningar från de nordiska länderna [Traveller's notes from the Northern countries] (in Swedish). Upsala – Leipzig: Lundeqvist – Otto Harrassowitz.
- Lundström, Vilhelm (1902). Anecdota byzantina e codicibus Upsaliensibus cum aliis collatis [Unpublished Byzantine works from Uppsala manuscripts, collated with others]. Upsala – Leipzig: Lundeqvist – Otto Harrassowitz.
- Lundström, Vilhelm (1907). Quaestiones Papinianae [Questions on Papinius] (in Latin). Upsala: Almqvist & Wiksell.
- Lundström, Vilhelm (1929). Undersökningar i Roms topografi [Researches of Roman Topography]. Svenskt arkiv för humanistiska avhandlingar, 2 (in Swedish). Gothenburg: Eranos.

=== Articles ===
- Lunström, Vilhelm (1897). "De Isidori Pelusiotae epistolis recensendis praelusiones" [Preliminary questions on the recension of Isidore of Pelusium's epistles]. Eranos (in Latin). 2 (2): 68–80.
- Lunström, Vilhelm (1899). "Ramenta Byzantina I" [Byzantine Swarfs, pt. 1]. Eranos (in Latin). 3 (4): 149–161.
- Lunström, Vilhelm (1900–1902). "Ramenta Byzantina II–VII" [Byzantine Swarfs, pt. 2–7]. Eranos (in Latin). 4 (2–4): 134–147.
- Lunström, Vilhelm (1905–1906). "Ramenta Byzantina VIII" [Byzantine Swarfs, pt. 8]. Eranos (in Latin). 6 (1–4): 50–54.
