= June Kronholz =

American journalist

June Kronholz (born 1947) is an American journalist. She is probably best known as the education writer for The Wall Street Journal. At present she is a contributing editor for Education Next, a quarterly periodical which is published by the Hoover Institution.

== Career ==
Kronholz began her career with The Wall Street Journal as a correspondent. She covered London, Africa, Hong Kong and the Far East. She then became the WSJ's Boston Bureau chief, after which she transferred to Washington, D.C. to become that Bureau's Deputy Chief. She concentrated on topics relating to Education, continuing to be based in Washington. She continues to contribute to the WSJ while also contributing to various other US publications.

== Significant works ==
- Series in The Wall Street Journal on the efforts of Jessie Tompkins, which eventually led to a ground-breaking legal decision on affirmative-action programs at universities
- The Incredible Shrinking American Male
- What's Happening in the States (Fordham Institute, January 2010)
- Challenging the Gifted (Spring 2011, EducationNext)
