= Rust Hills =

American Author and Editor

Lawrence Rust "Rusty" Hills (November 9, 1924 – August 12, 2008) was an American author and fiction editor at Esquire from 1957 to 1964. He remained associated with the magazine until 1999. Authors he championed include Norman Mailer, John Cheever, William Styron, Bruce Jay Friedman, William Gaddis, James Salter, Don DeLillo, Joy Williams, Ann Beattie, Richard Ford, Raymond Carver and E. Annie Proulx.

== Books written ==
His 1972 book How To Do Things Right: The Revelations of a Fussy Man was a set of humorous essays filled with obsessively detailed instructions on, for example, the correct way to make and eat milk-toast and clean ashtrays which "throughout its whole lifetime in a well-ordered household, an ashtray need never travel more than three feet from where it belongs, and never be out of place at all for more than thirty seconds".

In 1974 he edited "Writer's Choice" a collection of short stories. The writers included picked their personal favorite of their own work. Contributors included Updike, Mailer, Capote, Southern, Barth and Roth. David McKay Company, Inc. 1974 0679302700

His 1979 book Writing in General and the Short Story in Particular outlined his views on short story craft.

== Early life, family, and death ==
Hills attended Kenyon College for one year and received a B.A. and M.A. from Wesleyan University in 1948 and 1949, respectively. He served in the Merchant Marines during WWII He had two previous marriages before marrying Joy Williams, a famous writer herself. They were married for 34 years until his death in Belfast, Maine of cardiac arrest. His survivors are his wife of 34 years, writer Joy Williams, daughter Caitlin Hills, and grandson Cole Castro.
