= Adam Hochberg =

American journalist

Adam Hochberg is a radio correspondent for National Public Radio based in Chapel Hill, North Carolina. Hochberg reports on a broad range of issues in the Southeast. Since he joined NPR in 1995, Hochberg has traveled the region extensively, reporting on its changing economy, demographics, culture, and politics. He covered the 1996 Atlanta Olympics, followed candidates in three Presidential elections, and reported on more than a dozen hurricanes. He's also appeared as a guest on the popular NPR program Wait Wait… Don't Tell Me!.

Before joining NPR, Hochberg worked as a freelance journalist in North Carolina. He was a regular contributor to NPR, CBS Radio, North Carolina Public Radio, and North Carolina's statewide public television network. Prior to that, he served as assistant news director at WPTF Radio in Raleigh and as a reporter at WCHL (AM) Radio in Chapel Hill.

Five times, Hochberg has been named "North Carolina Radio Journalist of the Year" by the Radio-Television News Directors Association. His numerous other journalism awards include two Ohio State Awards, an RTNDA Edward R. Murrow Award Regional Award, and a Corporation for Public Broadcasting Public Radio Program Award.

Hochberg is active in journalism education. He's taught in the Duke University Continuing Education program and served on the board of directors for the University of North Carolina Journalism Alumni and Friends Association. He also has taught communication classes at Peace College in Raleigh.

A native of Chicago, Hochberg received his master's degree in 1986 from the University of North Carolina at Chapel Hill. He graduated from the Ohio University Honors Tutorial College in 1985. He and his wife Heidi, along with their daughter Elise, live in Chapel Hill.

Adam Hochberg is the younger brother of PBS NewsHour correspondent Lee Hochberg and Scott Hochberg, a member of the Texas House of Representatives representing District 137 in southwest Houston.
