= Scott Owens (poet) =

American poet

Scott Owens (born 1963), inaugural Poet Laureate of Hickory, NC, is an American poet, teacher, and editor.

== History ==
Owens was born in Greenwood, South Carolina, and raised in mill villages and on his grandparents' small farm. His father was in the military, and the family later moved to Fort Bragg, NC, and then to Darmstadt, Germany, and Augusta, Georgia, where he graduated from the Academy of Richmond County. Most of his early childhood was lived below the poverty line, necessitating frequent relocation in and around Greenwood. His childhood was also marked by periods of domestic abuse by his stepfathers. His mother was married 6 times during his childhood and his father 5 times. Three of their marriages were to each other. Owens graduated high school early so that he could work extended shifts in Greenwood's cotton mills to save money for college. In Hickory, Owens, with his wife, Julie, became owner of Taste Full Beans Coffeehouse, where he has hosted the monthly reading series, Poetry Hickory, since 2007.

=== Education ===
Owens was the first member of his family to attend college. He earned a Bachelor of Arts degree in English with a minor in Education at Ohio University, where he studied with novelist, Daniel Keyes, and poet, Paul Nelson. He continued on to the University of North Carolina, Charlotte for a master's degree in English, studying with Robin Hemley, Robert Waters Grey, and Christopher Davis, and working on the journal, "Southern Poetry Review". He also earned a Master of Fine Arts degree in Creative Writing from the University of North Carolina, Greensboro, studying under Fred Chappell and Stuart Dischell.

=== Poetry Community and Editing Work ===
Owens is the first Poet Laureate of Hickory, NC. He is the founder of the reading series, Poetry Hickory (2007 - ), the Hickory Poetry Salon (2025 - ), and the University Community Poetry Series (2016 - 2018), former editor of "Wild Goose Poetry Review," and a writer of reviews of poetry collections and articles about writing. He has also been author of the poetry column, "Musings," published in Focus Newspaper, founding editor of 234, Associate Editor of Southern Poetry Review, President of the Poetry Council of NC and Vice President of the NC Poetry Society, and Founder of The Art of Poetry at the Hickory Museum of Art. He has taught creativity, writing, and poetry workshops at various schools, conferences, and conventions throughout the Southeast, most recently at Lenoir Rhyne University. He has also served as a judge for numerous poetry contests and been on the board of various reading series. 25 of his students have gone on to publish at least one book of their own. Owens is recognized as a proponent of and community organizer for poetry.

=== Teaching ===
Owens has taught at the middle school, high school, and college levels, including a stint as Headmaster of The Patterson School.

Most of his creative and critical work has been completed while living in Hickory, North Carolina, and teaching at Lenoir Rhyne University and Catawba Valley Community College both of which have awarded him their "Excellence in Teaching Award."

=== Writing Awards ===
Owens's books, Prepositional, and Sky Full of Stars and Dreaming were nominated for a National Book Critics' Circle Award. His poems have been nominated for eleven Pushcart Prizes and seven Best of the Net Awards, and received awards from the Academy of American Poets, the North Carolina Poetry Society, the Poetry Society of South Carolina, the Next Generation Indie Awards, the NC Society of Historians, and the North Carolina Writer's Network. His poem, "So Norman Died of Course," received a Special Mention from the Pushcart Prize Anthology for 2009. and "On the Days I Am Not My Father," "Cleaning House," "The Arrival of the Past," and "Rails" were featured on Garrison Keillor's The Writer's Almanac.

Owens' papers are housed in the South Carolina Poetry Archives in the James B Duke Library at Furman University.

== Themes ==
Owens' poems feature a wide range of styles and themes often expressed as dialectics, including hope and despair, faith and agnosticism, abuse and parenting, alienation and existentialism, loneliness and collaboration, entrapment and liberation, personal relationships and self-sufficiency, nightmares and reality, the disappearance of a rural American South characterized as both pastoral and violent, and the possibilities of redemption, often found through relationships and expressed through something as small as a preposition, as his characters attempt to make sense of an often seemingly senseless world. His settings and imagery are familiar but often quirky, utilizing extended metaphors and juxtaposing the mundane with the transcendent in variously enlightening and disturbing ways.

His work is marked by diversity in tone, style and subject matter, at times nearly formal, at other times conversational and performance-based; at times distraught about the state of humanity, but just as often optimistic and celebratory; and varying between personal, political, philosophical, and observational. He often re-envisions the lives of familiar historical and mythological characters and has created his own everyman figure named Norman. He has written two books for children, Worlds Enough, and Holding Holden, and collaborated with artists, Missy Cleveland and Fiely Matias; photographer, Clayton Joe Young; and poet, Pris Campbell. His later books, including An Augury of Birds, eventually, Sky Full of Stars and Dreaming, Elemental, and The Song Is Why We Singhave tended more towards optimism and focused on nature. He cites deep imagism, confessionalism, and surrealism among his strongest influences.

== Works ==
- The Song Is Why We Sing, (Redhawk, 2026)
- Elemental, (Redhawk, 2025)
- Holding Holden, (Redhawk, 2025)
- eventually: haiku, Illustrated by Missy Cleveland (Redhawk, 2024)
- An Augury of Birds, Collaboration with Photographer, Clayton Joe Young (Redhawk, 2024)
- Round Here: Images From and Near Catawba County, Collaboration with Photographer, Clayton Joe Young (Redhawk, 2023)
- All In: A Novel of Love in Poetry, Collaboration with Poet, Pris Campbell(Redhawk, 2023)
- Prepositional: Selected and New Poems (Redhawk, 2022)
- Worlds Enough: Poems for Children (and a few grown ups), Collaboration with Artist, Missy Cleveland (Redhawk, 2022)
- Sky Full of Stars and Dreaming (Redhawk, 2021)
- Counting the Ways (Main Street Rag, 2020)
- Down to Sleep (Main Street Rag, 2016)
- Thinking About the Next Big Bang in the Galaxy at the Edge of Town (Main Street Rag, 2015)
- To (Main Street Rag, 2014)
- Eye of the Beholder (Main Street Rag, 2013)
- Shadows Trail Them Home, Collaboration with Poet, Pris Campbell (Clemson University Press, 2012)
- For One Who Knows How to Own Land (Future Cycle Press, 2012)
- Country Roads: Travels Through Rural North Carolina, Collaboration with Photographer Clayton Joe Young (2012)
- Something Knows the Moment (Main Street Rag, 2011)
- The Nature of Attraction, collaboration with Pris Campbell (Main Street Rag, 2010)
- Paternity (Main Street Rag, 2010)
- The Fractured World (Main Street Rag, 2008)
- Book of Days (Dead Mule, 2009)
- Deceptively Like a Sound (Dead Mule, 2008)
- The Persistence of Faith (Sandstone, 1994)
