= Don Lundstrom =

American sculptor

Don Lundstrom is an American sculptor whose sculptures are featured in public institutions, churches, museums, and private collections principally in the Midwestern United States.

Don Lundstrom is a native of Canton, Ohio and a graduate of Ohio University's School of Engineering. His work is expressed in cast bronze alloys, steel reinforced concrete, stainless steel, and hand-faceted slab glass. Usually figurative with a contemporary flare, he brings an emotional presence to his art. Since the late 1970s, Lundstrom 's sculptures have been acquired through juried art shows, commercial galleries and commissions.

Many collectors of his works have been Ohioans as well as clients as distant as the far west and Salzburg, Austria. Commissioned works have been produced for the Buckeye Container Corp., The House of LaRose, The Sisters of Francesca, The Hoover Company, Ohio University and several libraries in Ohio. Lundstrom is a member of the National Sculpture Society and a trustee of the Canton Art Museum.
