= Ohio University =

Public university in Athens, Ohio, US

- Motto: Religio Doctrina Civilitas, Prae Omnibus Virtus (Latin)
- Motto in English: "Religion, Learning, Civility; Above All, Virtue"
- Type: Public research university
- Established: February 18, 1804; 222 years ago
- Founder: Manasseh Cutler
- Parent institution: University System of Ohio
- Accreditation: HLC
- Academic affiliations: ORAU; SOCHE; Space-grant
- Endowment: $1.0 billion (April 2026)
- Budget: $954.8 million (FY2026)
- President: Lori Stewart Gonzalez
- Provost: John McCarthy
- Academic staff: 1,288 (fall 2023) (Note: At the main campus in Athens.)
- Students: 24,937 (fall 2023)
- Undergraduates: 19,100 (fall 2023)
- Postgraduates: 5,837 (fall 2023)
- Location: Athens, Ohio, US; 39.324°N 82.102°W
- Campus: 1,850 acres (750 ha); Distant town
- Other campuses: Chillicothe; Cleveland; Dublin; Eastern; Lancaster; Southern; Zanesville
- Newspaper: The Post
- Colors: Cutler Green & Cupola White
- Nickname: Bobcats
- Sporting affiliations: NCAA Division I FBS – MAC
- Mascot: Rufus the Bobcat
- Website: ohio.edu

Ohio University (OHIO or OU) is a public research university with its main campus in Athens, Ohio, United States. Founded in 1804, it was the first university established in the former Northwest Territory. (Note: Vincennes University in Indiana was founded as a high school-level academy in 1801, but was not chartered as a university until 1806.) The university enrolled about 25,000 undergraduate and graduate students in Athens as of 2023. It maintains seven regional and extension campuses across Ohio.

Ohio University comprises nine undergraduate colleges, a graduate college, a college of medicine, and a public affairs school. It offers more than 250 areas of undergraduate study as well as certificates, master's, and doctoral degrees. It is a member of the University System of Ohio. The university is accredited by the Higher Learning Commission and classified among "R1: Doctoral Universities – Very high research spending and doctorate production".

Ohio's intercollegiate athletic teams are the Bobcats, and compete in the National Collegiate Athletic Association (NCAA) at the Division I level as charter members of the Mid-American Conference. Ohio football has participated in 16 bowl games through the 2023 season. The men's basketball team has made 14 appearances in the NCAA Division I basketball tournament.

== History ==
=== Charter and establishment ===
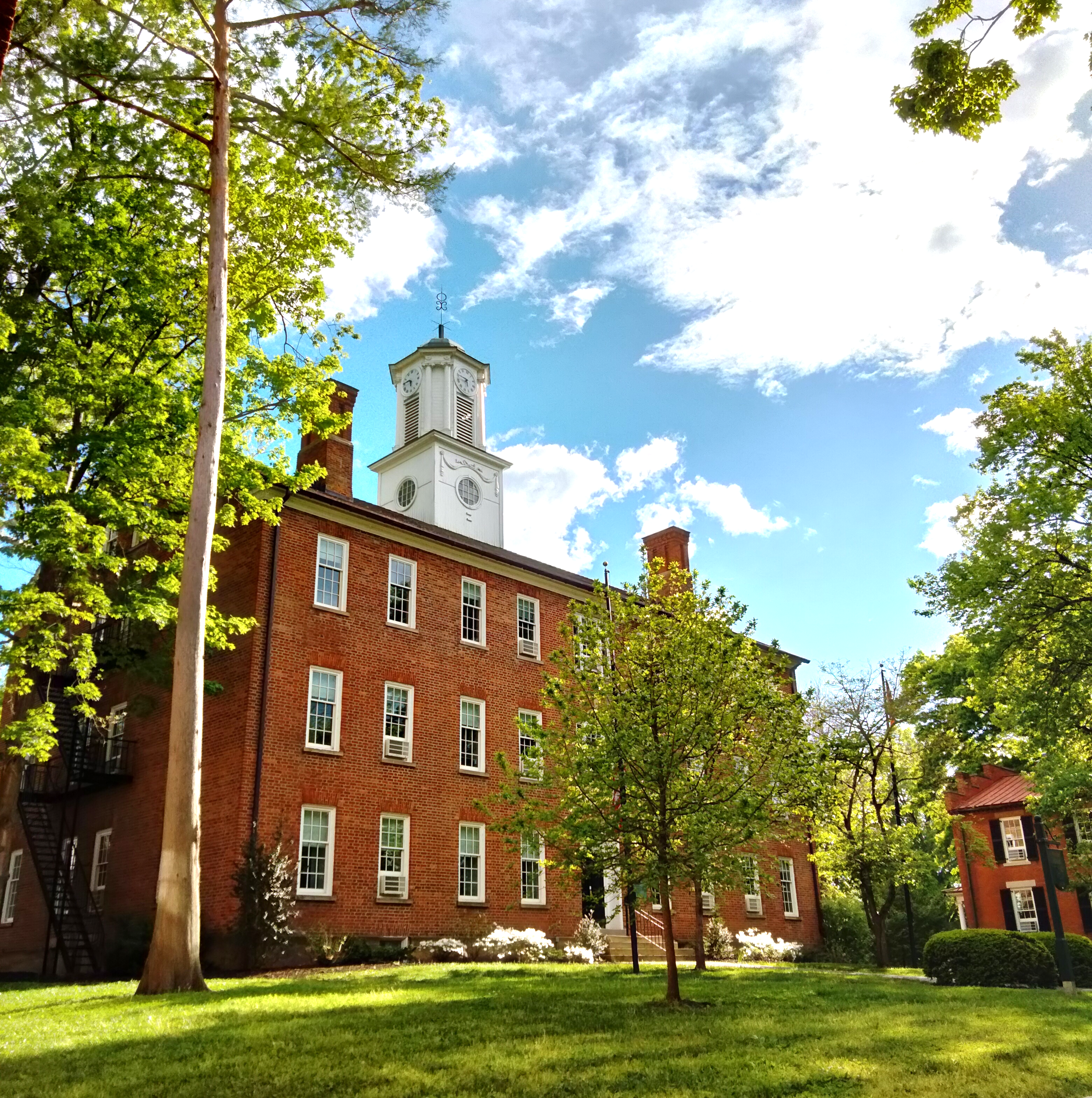
Manasseh Cutler Hall, constructed by 1816 and opened in 1819, was the first academic building in the former Northwest Territory and was named after university founder Manasseh Cutler.

A university in the Ohio Country was first envisioned by Manasseh Cutler, credited as the school's founder along with Revolutionary War Brigadier General Rufus Putnam. In addition to being instrumental in its founding, Putnam was also an original trustee of the university. Putnam Hall is named for him. Cutler had served as a chaplain in the Continental Army. In 1787, a contract was made between the Board of Treasury of the United States and the Ohio Company of Associates, which set aside the College Lands to support a university. In 1797, settlers from Marietta, Ohio, traveled downstream on the Ohio River and up the Hocking River to establish a location for the school in the College Lands, founding Athens due to its location directly between Marietta and Chillicothe, Ohio.

In 1802, approval was granted by the government of the Northwest Territory for the establishment of the American Western University, but the school was not operated under that name. Ohio University was recognized by the new state on February 18, 1804, with its charter being certified by the Ohio General Assembly. It was the first university established in the former Northwest Territory. The first three students enrolled in 1809. The first two bachelor's degrees were granted in 1815.

=== 19th century to present ===
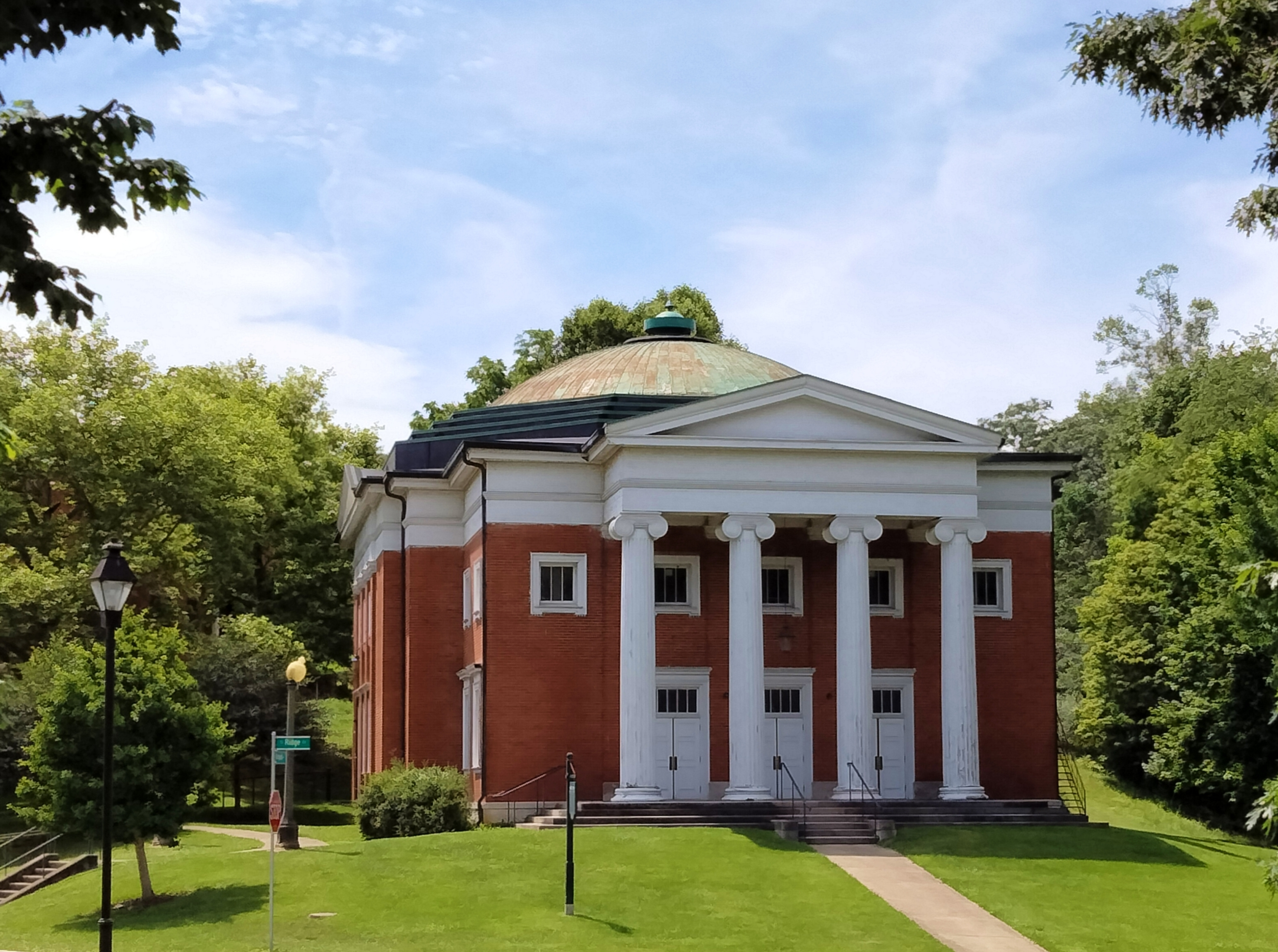
The Ridges Auditorium

Ohio University was closed between 1843 and 1848. Women were first admitted to the university in 1868. In 1874, the Ohio General Assembly created the new Ohio State University in Columbus as a land grant school upon passage of the Morrill Act of 1862. At that time some representatives proposed that both Ohio University and Miami University be demoted to preparatory schools. In 1880, it was instead suggested that Ohio and Miami be merged directly with Ohio State, but the 1896 Sleeper Bill, introduced by Athenian David L. Sleeper, the speaker of the Ohio House of Representatives, provided annual support for the university; this set the precedent for continuing state support of Ohio University. A second challenge was defeated in 1906.

The 20th century saw dramatic growth in student enrollment, academic offerings, and research facilities. Between 1955 and 1970, undergraduate enrollment tripled from 7,000 to 20,000. During this era, the campus grew, with the construction of 25 new dormitories located on two new residential college greens, with radio and television stations, research and classroom facilities, and the construction of the 13,000-seat Convocation Center arena. Ohio University ranks among the top 25 largest residential college campuses in the United States.

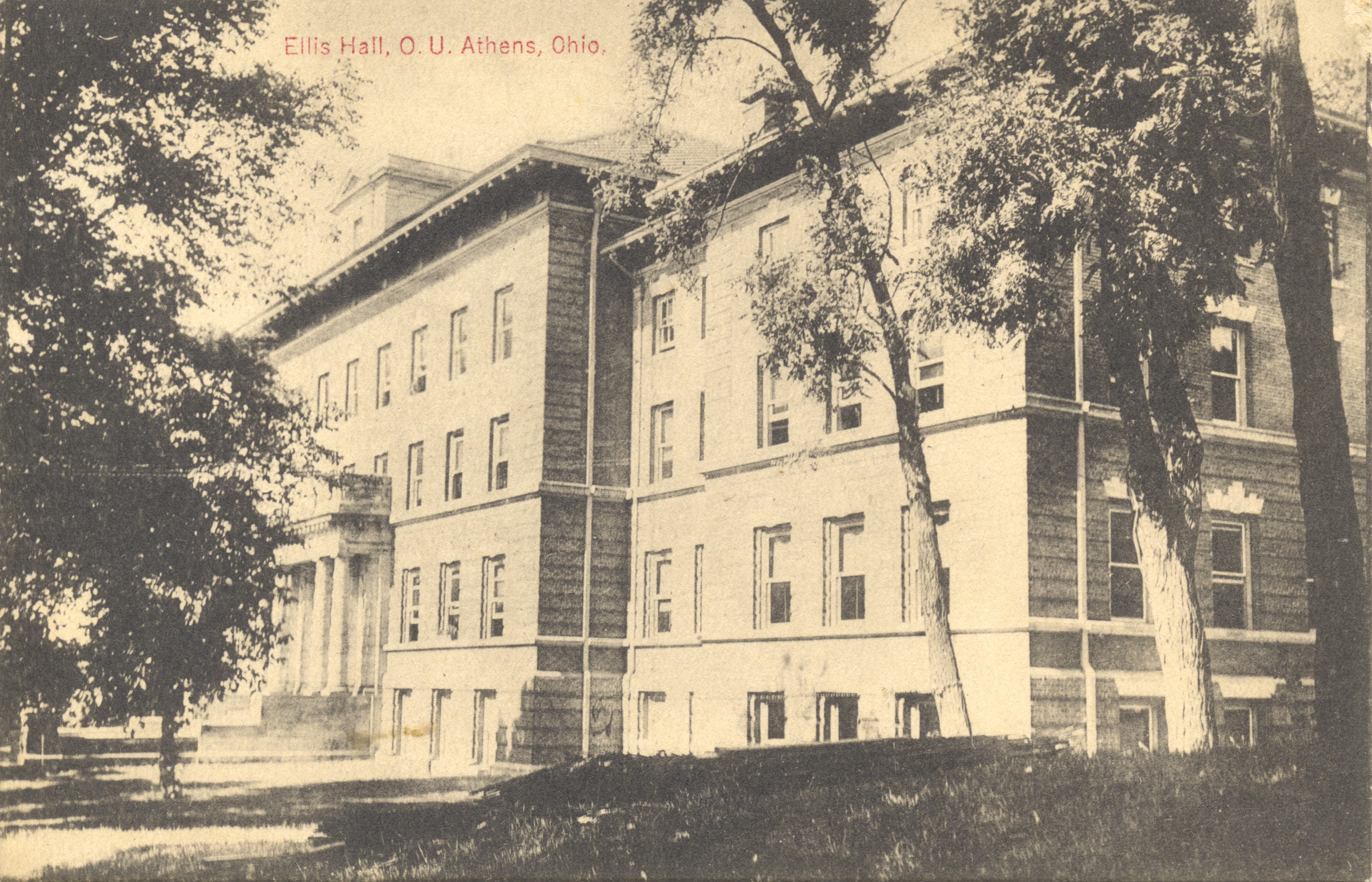
Ellis Hall was built in the early 20th century entirely with state funding.

Ohio restructured its two colleges into five in 1935, establishing the colleges of Commerce, Fine Arts, and Applied Science in addition to the existing colleges of Arts & Sciences and Education. The graduate college was created in 1936, and the first PhD program was initiated in 1956 in chemistry. Starting mid–century, the university also began to establish regional campuses throughout southeast Ohio. The first, Ohio University – Chillicothe, was opened in 1946 to help eliminate post-World War II overcrowding on the university's main campus. The school began with 281 students, 70 percent of which were armed services veterans. Later campuses would come in 1946 at Zanesville, 1956 in Ironton and Lancaster, 1957 in St. Clairsville, and formerly Proctorville in 2006.

In 1964, U.S. President Lyndon B. Johnson publicly referenced his Great Society initiative for the first time on the College Green, giving the university exposure across America and internationally. On May 4, 1970, the Ohio National Guard was ordered to open fire on students demonstrating against the Vietnam War at Kent State University, killing 4 and wounding 9. At the same time, there were sit-ins and anti-war riots at Ohio University, even more intense than those of Kent State. This was partly due to the administration's refusal to close the university; instead of going home, many students from other Ohio universities that did close came to Athens to protest further. When the Ohio National Guard was called in to Athens, there was a 3-hour battle at the Baker Center, resulting in 23 injured and 54 arrested students. On May 15, the campus was closed.

Alden Library was completed in 1969. In 1975, Ohio established its medical school, known as the Heritage College of Osteopathic Medicine. Heritage is the only medical school in the state to award the Doctor of Osteopathic Medicine degree. In 1979, on the university's 175th anniversary, Chubu University of Japan donated 175 cherry trees. The Ohio University Innovation Center, a technology business incubator, started in 1983. The Ohio University Edison Biotechnology Institute was founded in 1984. In the Glidden administration, from 1994 to 2004, new construction included the Life Sciences Research Facility, Emeriti Park, Walter Hall, plus major renovations to Gordy Hall, Grover Center, and Memorial Auditorium; the expansion of Bentley Hall and Copeland Hall; and groundwork for the new Baker Center that opened in 2007. In the fall of 2012, Ohio University converted its academic calendar from quarters to semesters, after first having changed to quarters in 1967.

== Campuses ==
=== Athens campus ===
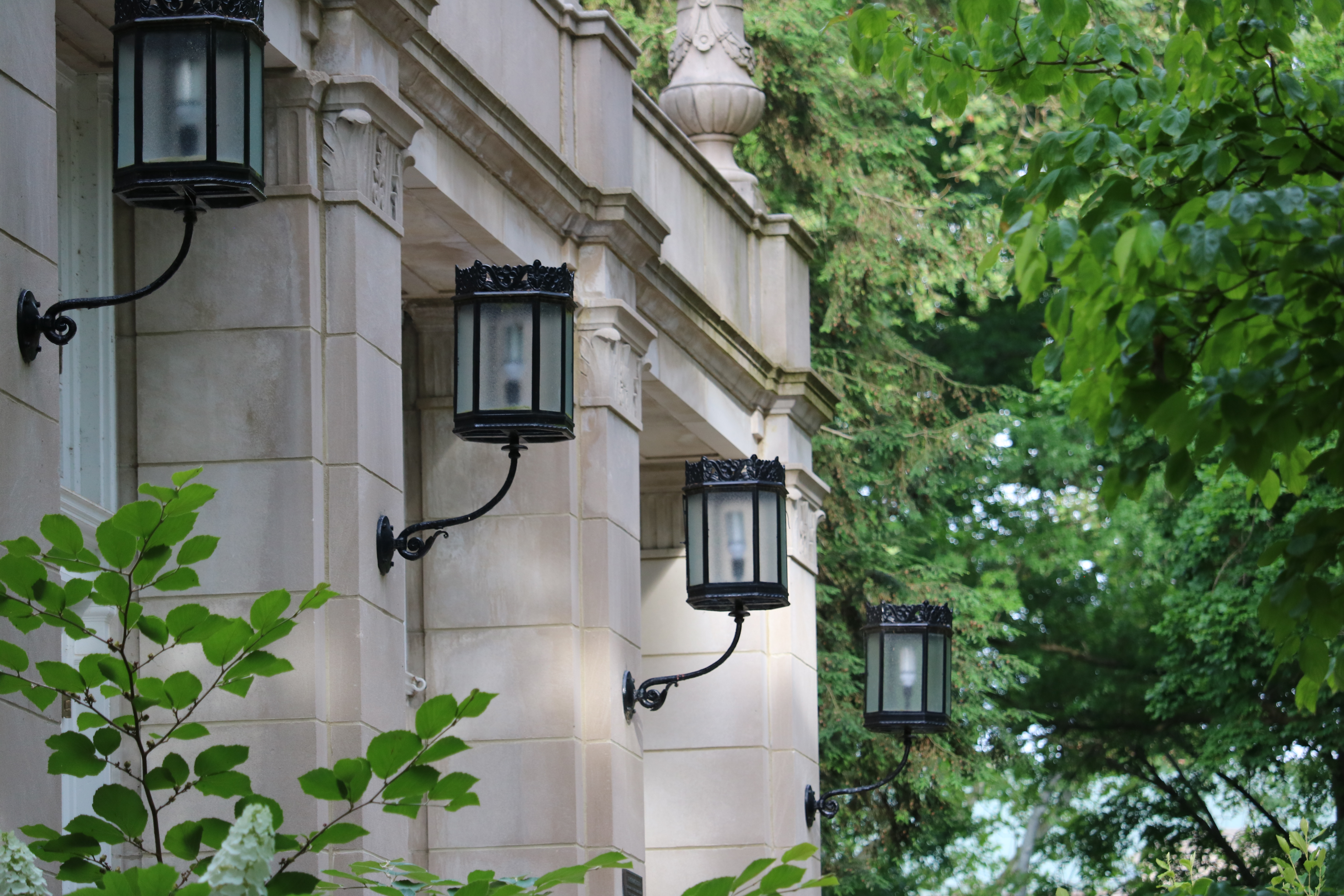
Templeton-Blackburn Alumni Memorial Auditorium

The main residential university campus is in Athens, Ohio, overlooking the Hocking River. Constructed under the Jefferson presidency, New England and Early Americana Federalist themes are prevalent in the university's earliest architecture. Development of the campus began in 1812 with the erection of the university's central building, Manasseh Cutler Hall, a registered national landmark, and built only 20 years after the White House. Cutler Hall's University Chimes, replacing an existing old cast iron bell, chime on the half hour every day until 9:00pm. The original bell, the 3rd oldest university bell in America, which is still hung in the Cutler Hall Cupola, rang to signal the start and end of the school day, as well as to signal the end of different class periods. Cast in the early 1800s, it served the university for well over a century.

==== College Green ====
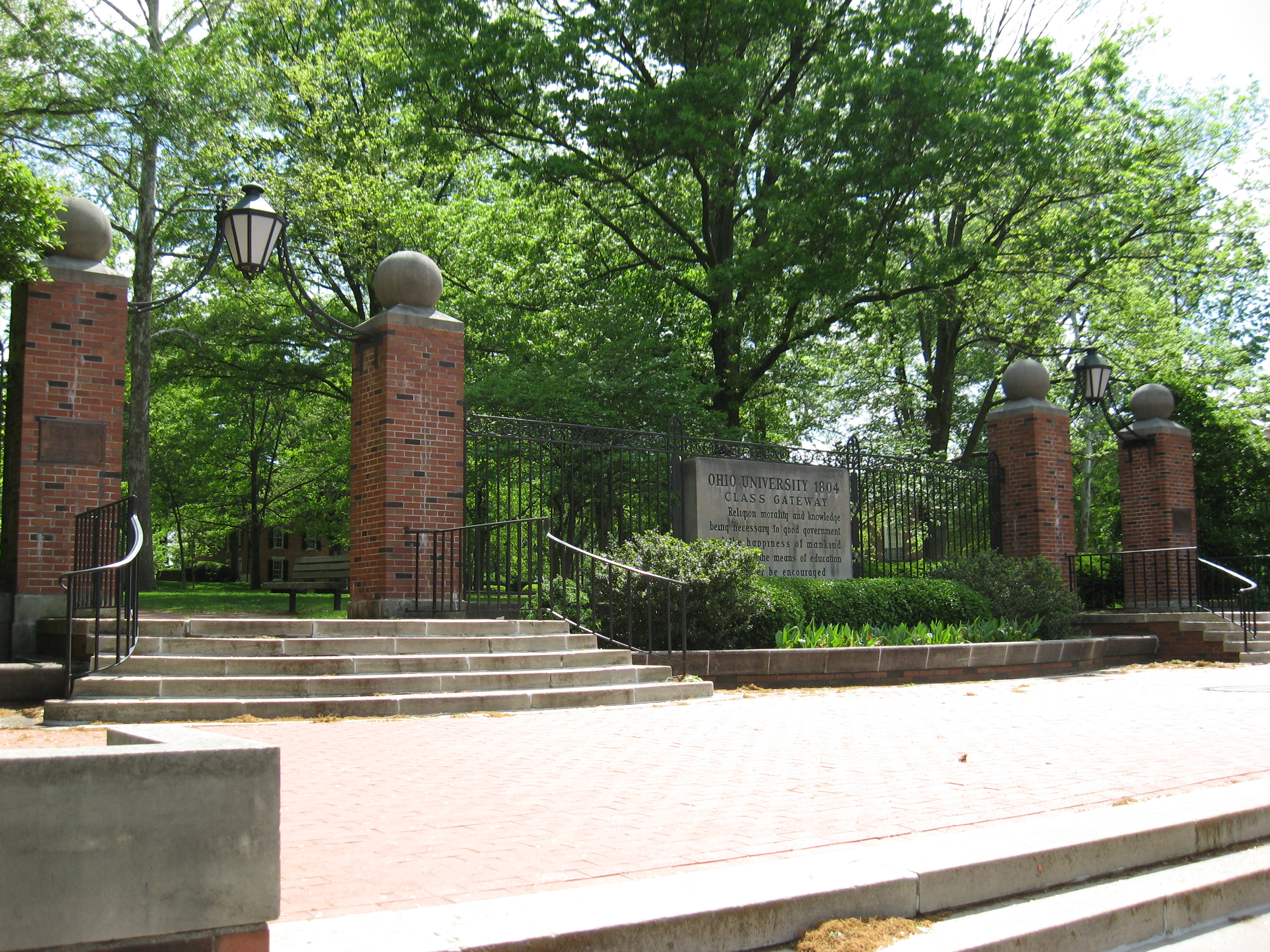
The entrance to the College Green

The historic College Green is the central quadrangle lawn and the location of significant campus buildings: Manasseh Cutler Hall, the office of the president; Wilson Hall, the college of arts and sciences; McGuffey Hall, named for William McGuffey; and the College Gateway. These three original primary structures are featured elements of the current official university logo and remain true to their original design of over 200 years ago. The College Green has changed little in the past two centuries, which contributes to the university's colonial appearance. The green, inspired by the university founders, is based upon the classic layout of traditional English and New England towns and is similar to other university quadrangles. College Green features Galbreath Chapel, the spire of which, topped with a brass weather vane, is modeled after that of the portico of Nash's All Souls Church in London.

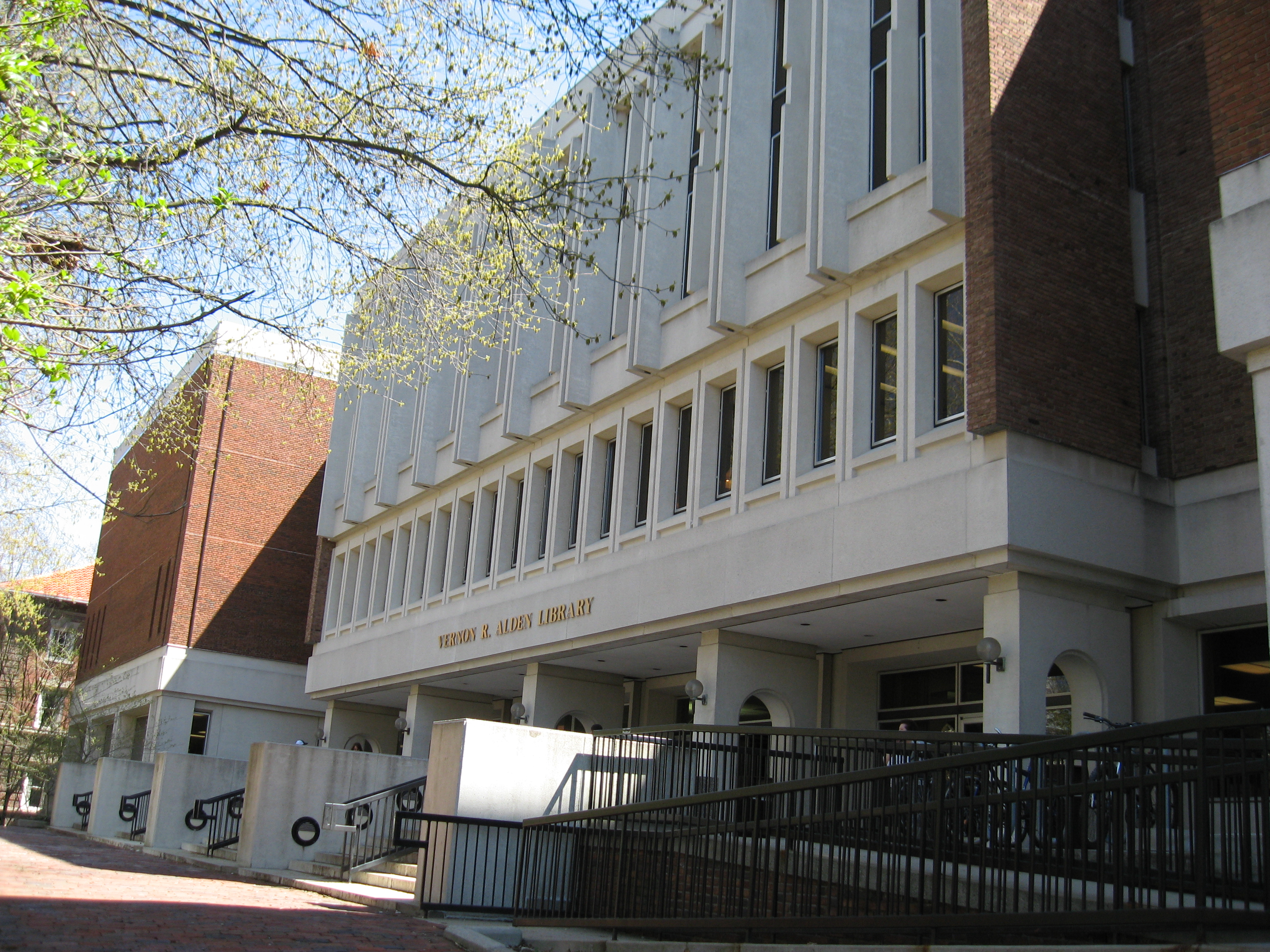
Vernon R. Alden Library

Other buildings on the College Green include Chubb Hall, home to Undergraduate Admissions as well as the offices of the bursar and registrar; Ellis Hall, home to the departments of English, classics, religious studies, and philosophy; Templeton-Blackburn Memorial Auditorium; as well as Bryan Hall, an upperclassman residence hall. The university sundial, located behind Galbreath Chapel, was constructed in 1907 and marks the original location of the university's first building. College Green has two gateways. Alumni Class Gateway has an inscription facing those entering the green "so enter that thou mayest grow in knowledge wisdom and love", while those departing see the text "so depart that daily thou mayest thy fellowmen thy country and thy god". The other gate, Class Gateway, commemorates the first graduating class of 1815 and features words taken from the Northwest Ordinance of 1787: "Religion, morality, and knowledge being necessary to good government and the happiness of mankind, schools and the means of education shall forever be encouraged". Traditions surrounding College Green include the latter half of first year convocation, where students, led by the Ohio University Marching 110, march up Richland Avenue, onto Presidents Street, turning north onto Court Street, and entering the green through the College Gate at the corner of Court and Union Streets. From there, a large involvement fair is held where students find clubs they wish to join.

==== John Calhoun Baker University Center ====
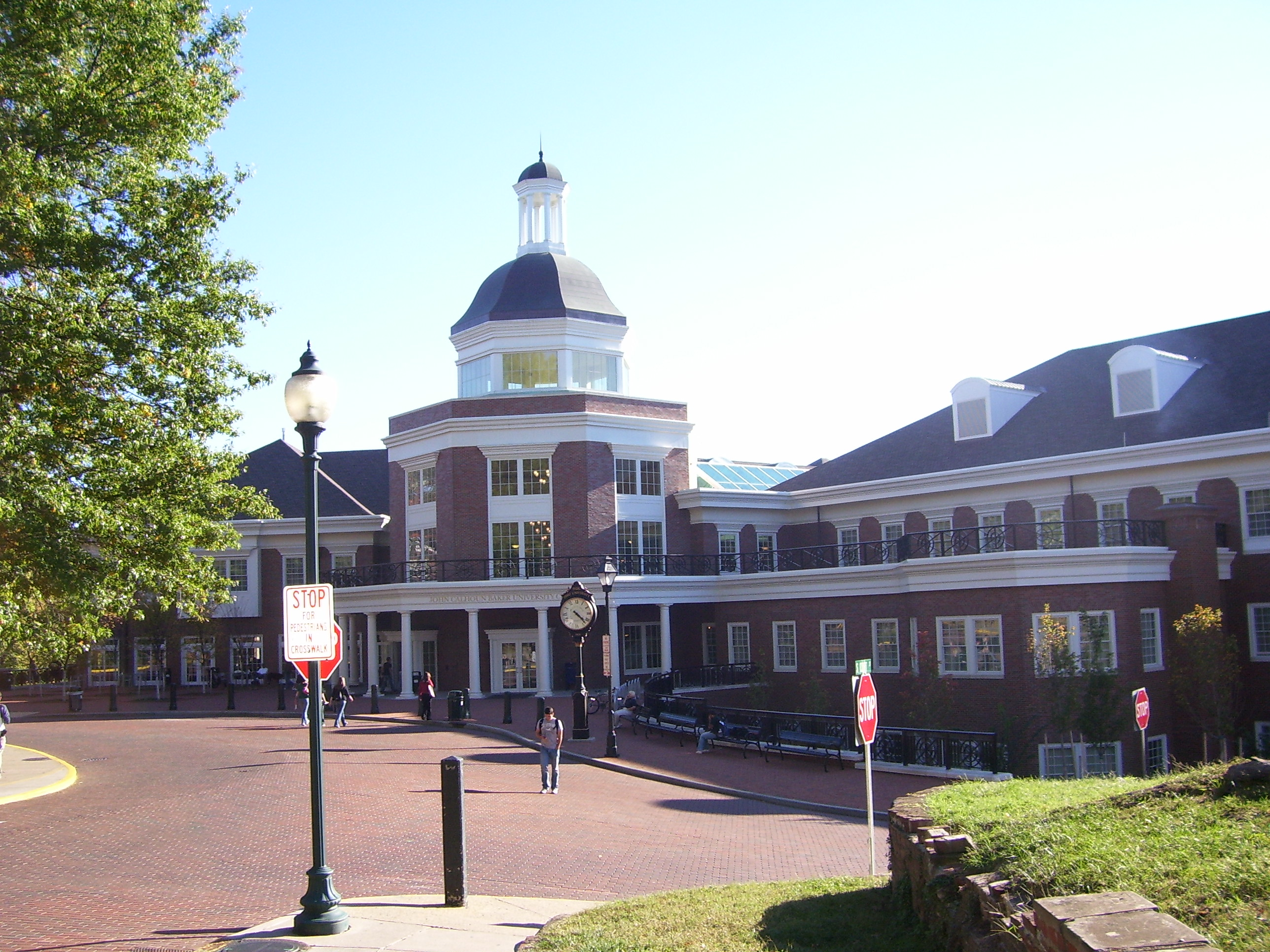
The Baker University Center sits atop a hillside where the Hocking River had cut.

The John Calhoun Baker University Center, which opened in January 2007, is named after the 14th president of the university. The facility replaced the original Baker Center located on East Union Street across from College Green and serves as the hub of campus activity. Electronic maps and virtual university e-tours, available at center information desks and online, direct visitors across campus. The building features Georgian-influenced Federal architecture and large windows that admit natural light and afford expansive views of the southern and western sides of the campus. In contrast to the exterior's red brick and white columns, the interior has a more contemporary style with high domed ceilings. Terrazzo mosaics of aspects of the earth's globe are embedded in the atrium of the main entrance to the building. Baker Center contains a large food court called West 82; a pub bistro called Latitude 39; a Grand Ballroom; The Honors Collegium, The Wall of Presidents, the Bobcat Student Lounge, a shop called Bobcat Depot that sells apparel, computers, and accessories; a theater seating 400; study areas; computer labs; administrative offices; and numerous conference rooms. The Front Room, a large coffee house named after a former popular university rathskeller, features a stage, artwork and a community fireplace. It serves Starbucks products and university bakery items and is housed on the fourth floor, which opens onto its own outside terrace as well as onto the intersection of Park Place and Court Streets, making it a popular spot for students between classes. Other amenities include a United States Post Office and the Trisolini Art Gallery, named after a prominent fine arts faculty member.

==== East Green ====
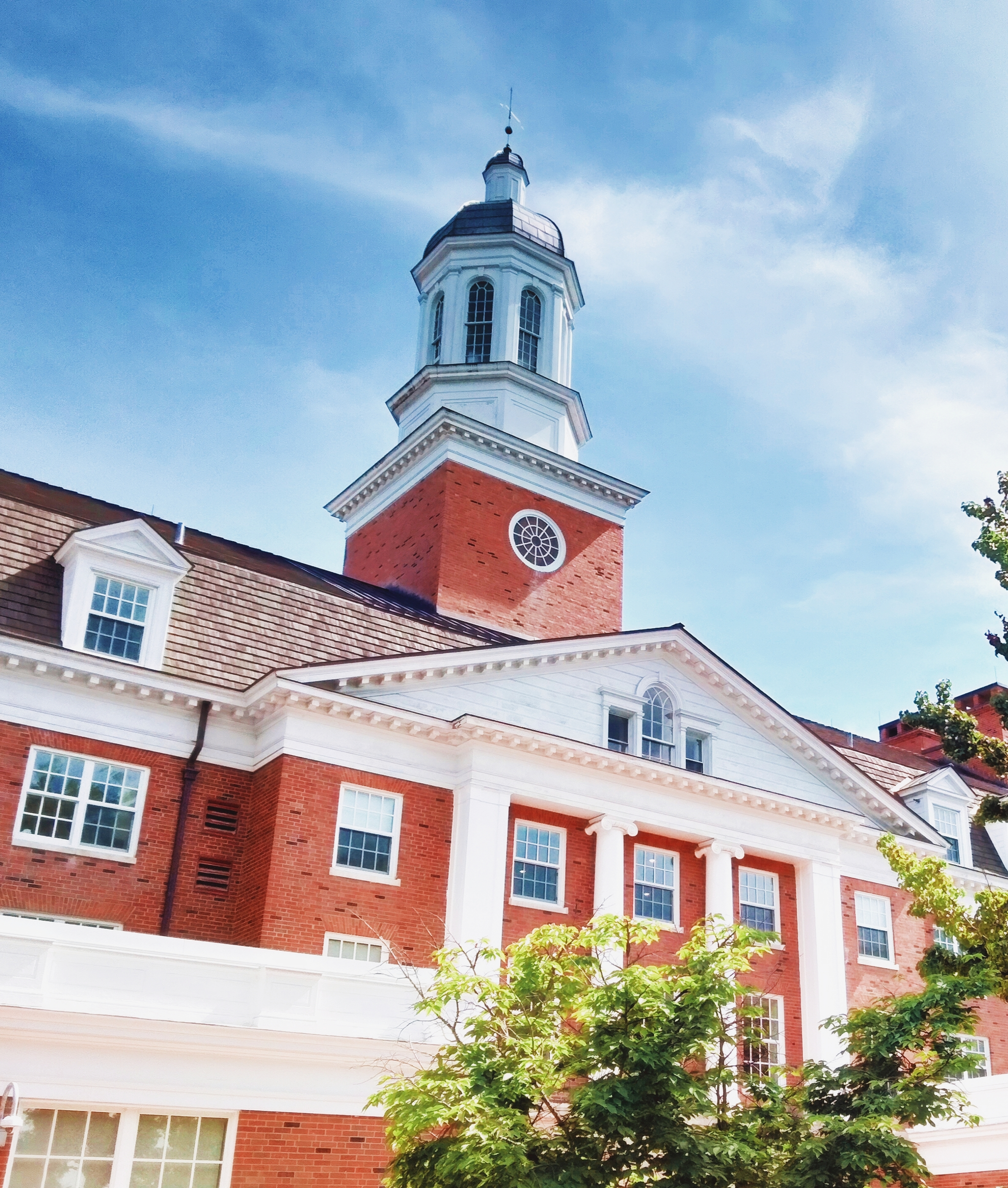
Jefferson Hall, completed 1956 and opened 1958, anchors the East Green.

There are fourteen residence halls on East Green. This area of the university is the oldest residential green and includes three of the steepest walkways at the hilly Athens campus: Morton Hill, the Bryan Hall terrace and staircase, and Jefferson Hill. Each walkway affords East Green residents access to classrooms if they are willing to walk or bicycle. East Green is also home to Shively Court, a newly renovated dining hall with dine-in, take-out, and grab-and-go options. East Green includes Jefferson Marketplace with several food vendors.

==== South Green ====
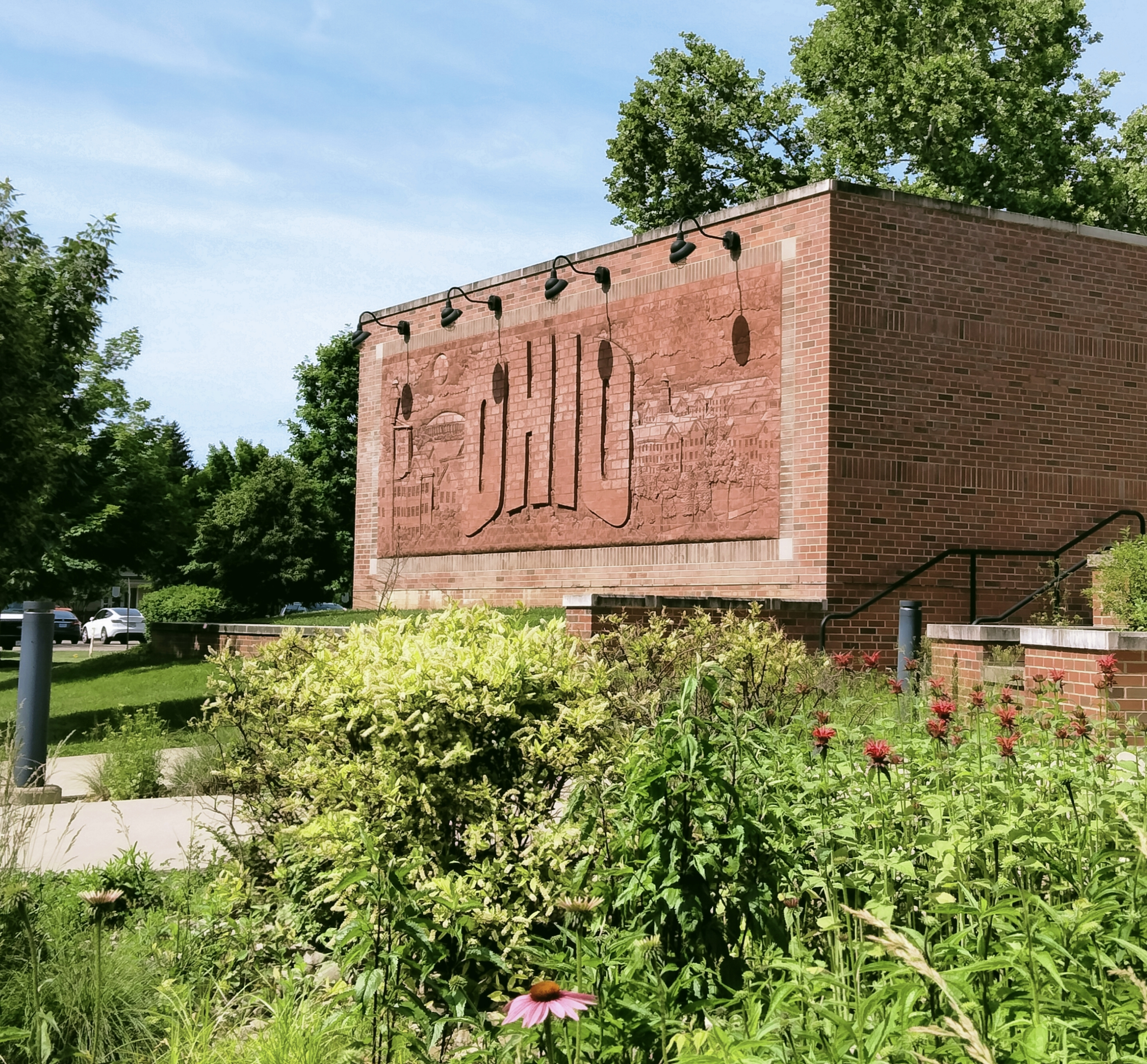
OHIO Brick Mural, South Green

South Green includes areas near Emeriti Park, and extends along the Hocking River valley. There are fifteen residence halls on South Green, following the addition of four new residence halls in the summer of 2015. South Green is home to several facilities, including:

- Nelson Court, the university's largest dining hall with an adjacent market and coffee shop, South Side Espresso Bar.
- Peden Stadium, the university's football field and the oldest football venue in the Mid-American conference, adjacent to a new multipurpose indoor training facility, Walter Fieldhouse. It is a designated Official Ohio Historical Site by the Ohio Historical Society.
- Bird Ice Arena, home to the Ohio University hockey team, recreational skating, and academic skating classes.
- Ohio University Aquatic Center, home to the university's swimming and diving teams.

==== West Green ====
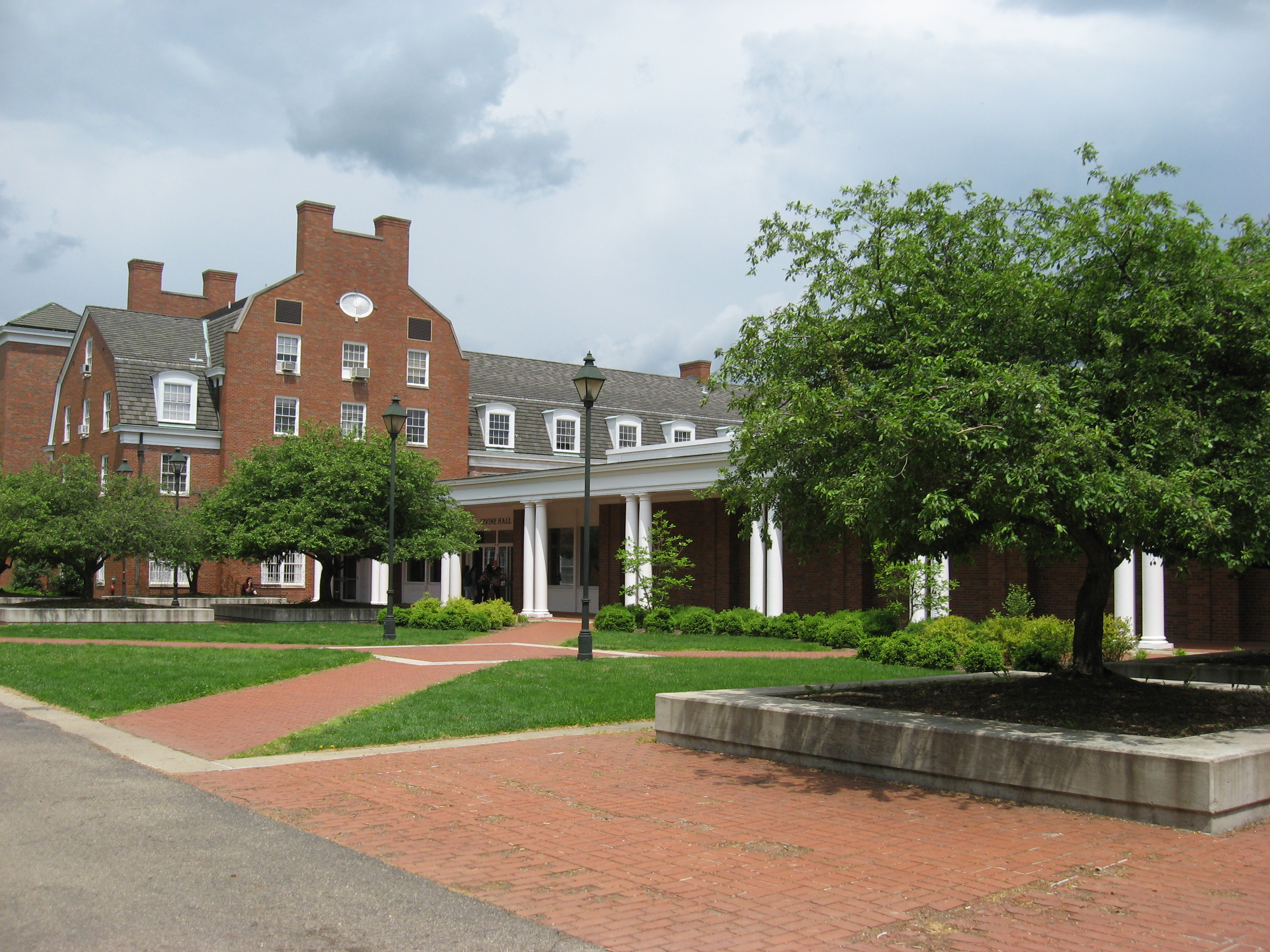
Irvine Hall, a mixed-use facility on West Green

West Green includes buildings around the western part of the Athens campus. The Ohio Athletic Mall spans the western portion of the campus, near the end of the Athens bike path at the Union street crossing. The mall features lacrosse, baseball, track, field and related athletic venues. Along the surrounding Hocking River is a series of sakura trees planted to commemorate the university's historic partnership with Chubu University. Japanese students sponsor an annual "Sakura Festival" each year, a cultural event celebrating the visually dramatic blossoming of the cherry trees and their evening lightings. Nearby Bicentennial Park features Input, a landscape artwork by artist Maya Lin.

Anchoring the West Green quadrangle is the Stocker Center, which houses the Russ College of Engineering and Technology.

There are eight residence halls on the West Green. The West Green also includes:

- The District on West Green, a dining hall with various options, including a kitchen for those with dietary restrictions.
- Academic and Research Center
- Ohio Softball Field, home to the softball team.
- Goldsberry Track, home to the track and field teams.
- Bob Wren Stadium, home to the baseball team.
- Chessa Field, home to the women's soccer program.
- Pruitt Field, home to the field hockey team.

==== Other facilities ====
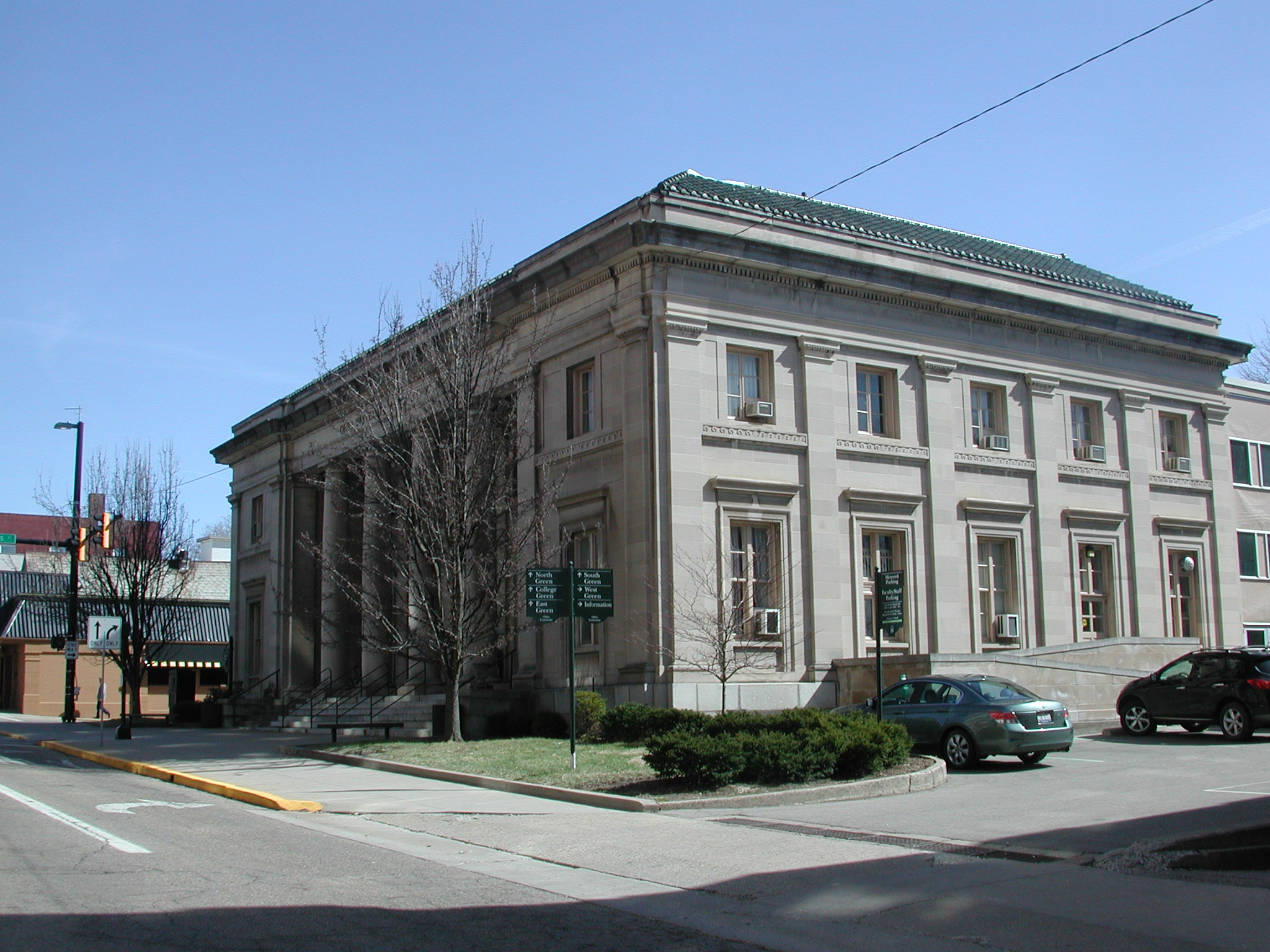
Haning Hall houses the Office of Instructional Innovation and Center for Teaching & Learning, including Print-Based Education, Summer Sessions, OHIO Online, and Regional Higher Education.

- The Ridges, formerly Athens Mental Hospital, was acquired by the university. The Victorian styled area has since been re-purposed as a university complex of classrooms and administrative offices surrounded by a large nature preserve. Additionally, a new planetary observatory is located nearby.
- Gordon K. Bush Airport
- Edwards Accelerator Laboratory, a particle accelerator used for nuclear physics and astrophysics research.
- The Athena Cinema, an on-campus, early art deco styled century-old movie theater owned by the university.
- Lausche Heating Plant, an on-campus plant that provides heat to all buildings on campus.

=== Regional campuses ===
The first regional campus, Ohio University – Chillicothe, was opened in 1946 to help eliminate post-World War II overcrowding on the university's main campus. The school began with 281 students, 70 percent of whom were armed services veterans. Today, more than 9,800 students attend Ohio University's five regional campuses:

- Ohio University Chillicothe Campus, founded in 1946
- Ohio University Eastern Campus in St. Clairsville, founded in 1957
- Ohio University Lancaster Campus, founded in 1956
- Ohio University Southern Campus in Ironton, founded in 1956
- Ohio University Zanesville Campus, founded in 1946

The Heritage College of Osteopathic Medicine operates two extension campuses: in Cleveland, which is affiliated with the Cleveland Clinic, and in the Columbus suburb of Dublin. Ohio University Southern formerly maintained the Proctorville Center branch in Proctorville, Ohio, which opened in April 2007 and was acquired by the Collins Career Technical Center in October 2023.

== Organization ==
College/school founding
College/school	Year founded
College of Arts & Sciences	1902
Russ College of Engineering and Technology	1920
Scripps College of Communication	1924
College of Business	1927
Graduate College	1936
College of Fine Arts	1947
Patton College of Education	1959
Honors Tutorial College	1972
Heritage College of Osteopathic Medicine	1975
College of Health Sciences and Professions	1979
University College	2004
Voinovich School of Leadership and Public Service	2007

The Athens campus is organized by its 12 degree-granting academic colleges and schools, the Ohio University Libraries system, and various support services. The College of Arts & Sciences is the largest academic division at the university, host to a broad range of liberal arts courses in the humanities, the social sciences, and the natural sciences as the foundation for all undergraduate degrees.

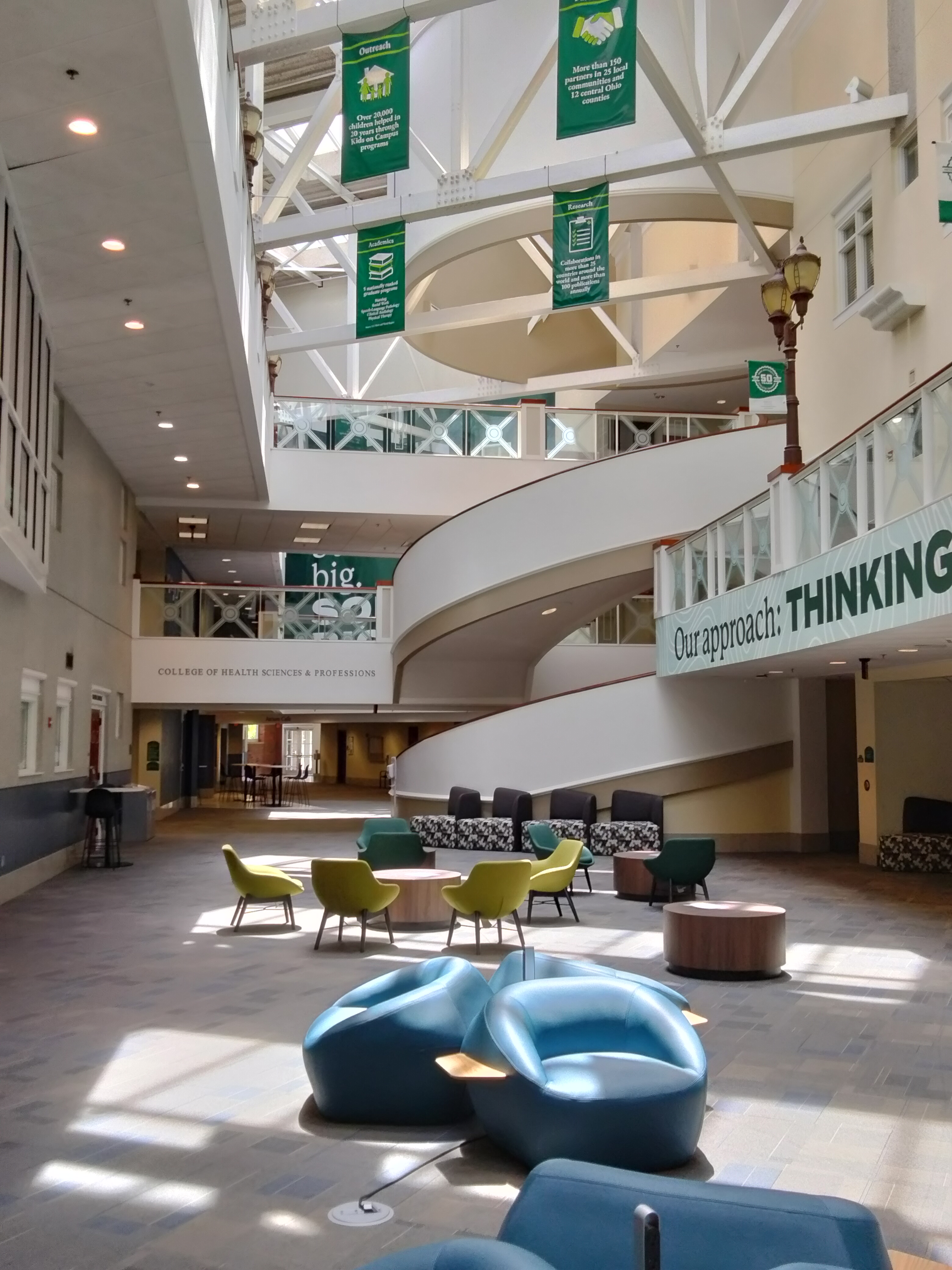
College of Health Sciences and Professions

The Russ College of Engineering and Technology is home to the university's highly ranked programs in the traditional fields of engineering at the undergraduate and graduate level. It enrolls approximately 1,400 undergraduates and almost 300 graduate students. It is named in honor of Fritz J. Russ, an alumnus in electrical engineering and the founder of Systems Research Laboratories, a major bioengineering concern.

The Scripps College of Communication comprises five schools and one research lab: The E.W. Scripps School of Journalism, the J. W. McClure School of Information and Telecommunication Systems, the School of Communication Studies, the School of Media Arts and Studies (formerly the School of Telecommunications), the School of Visual Communication (VisCom), and the Game Research and Immersive Design (GRID) Lab.

The College of Business offers nine different majors and a general business minor for students with non-business majors, as well as the "OHIO MBA" in a variety of learning formats. Copeland Hall, seat of the college, maintains six computer labs and two study lounges with computers, as well as many conference rooms and small group rooms for an intimate, collaborative team atmosphere. All business classes are taught by professors instead of graduate students.

The College of Fine Arts offers academic programs in art, dance, film, interdisciplinary arts, music, and theater. The Ohio University School of Music celebrated its 100th anniversary in 2017. The university's film program is located within the School of Dance, Film, and Theater in the College of Fine Arts. The Kennedy Museum of Art is housed at the Ridges in Lin Hall.

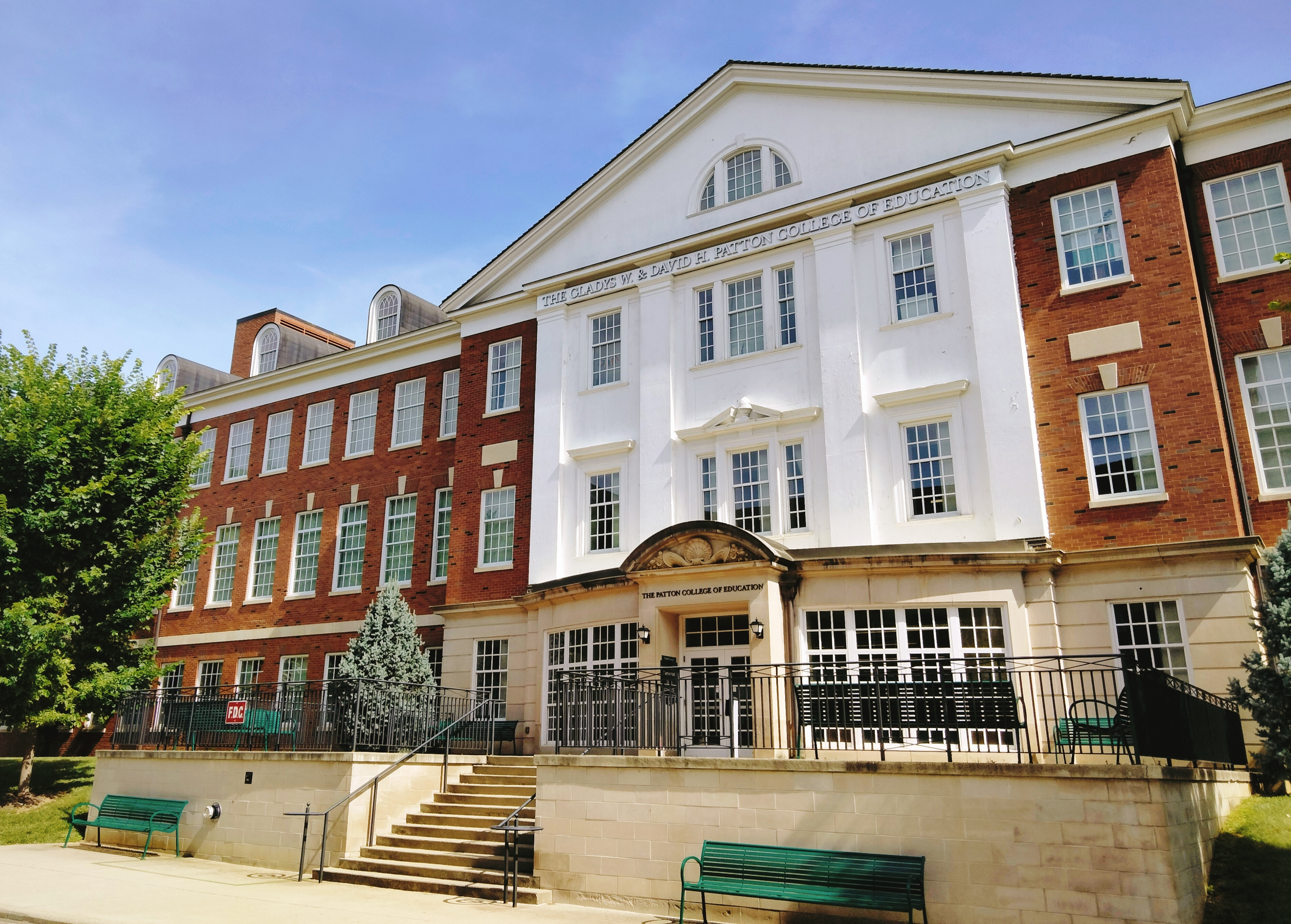
Patton College of Education

The history of the Patton College of Education dates back to May 11, 1886. The Normal Department – the predecessor to today's College of Education – was the first state-supported teacher preparation program in Ohio. The state's first kindergarten opened on the Ohio University campus in 1907. Today, the College of Education is organized into three departments: Counseling and Higher Education, Educational Studies, and Teacher Education. The college currently serves more than 2,100 undergraduate and 800 graduate students. On July 1, 2010, The Patton College became the home of several programs previously housed in the College of Health and Human Services, creating two new departments: Human and Consumer Science Education, and Recreation and Sport Pedagogy.

The Honors Tutorial College offers programs in 34 disciplines, ranging from journalism to astrophysics. The Office of Nationally Competitive Awards is housed in the college. It is based on the British tutorial system typically found at undergraduate colleges, where students are placed either one on one or in small group instruction.

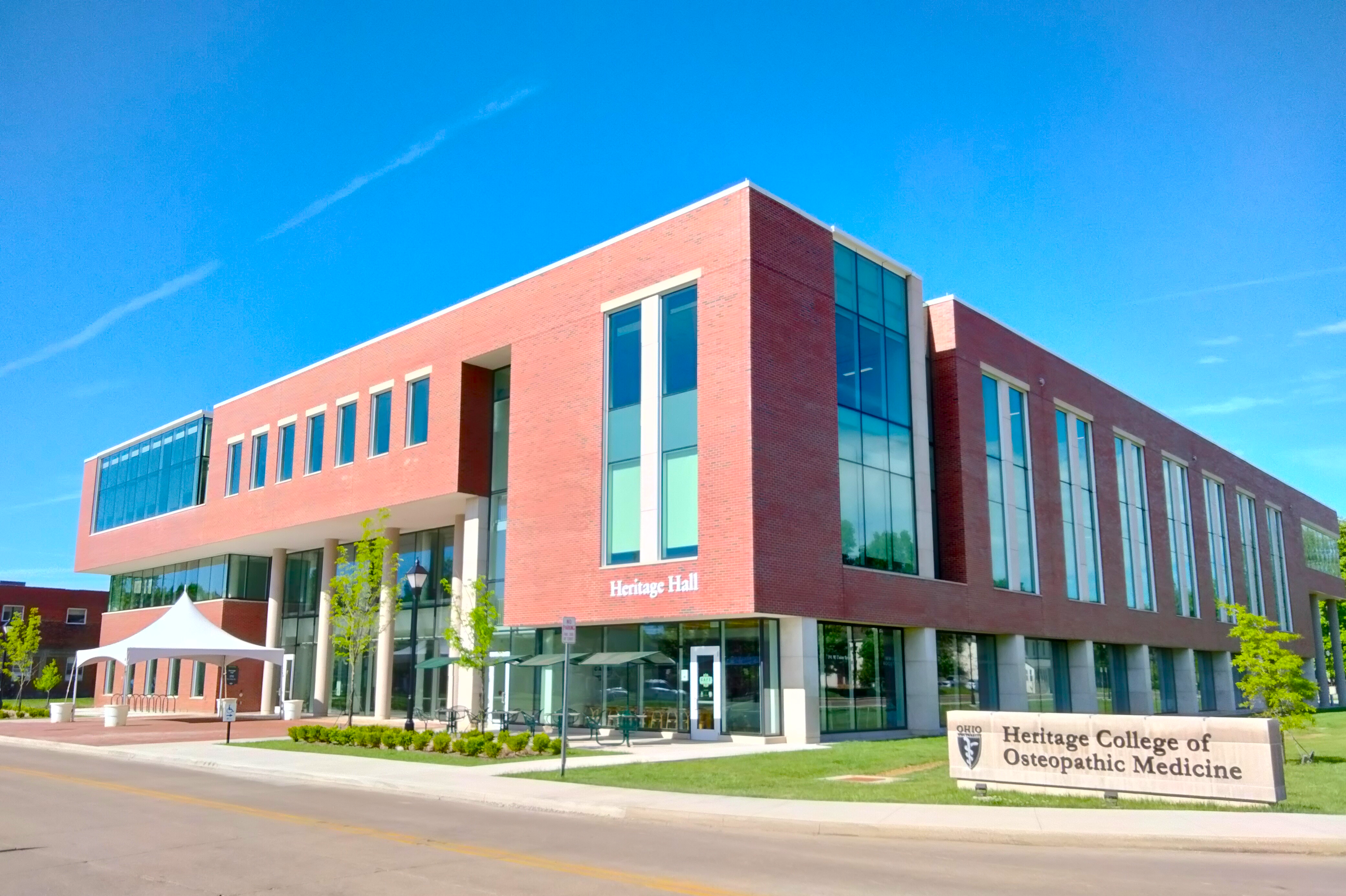
The Heritage College of Osteopathic Medicine

Heritage College of Osteopathic Medicine was established in 1975. It is the only osteopathic medical college in the state, and offers the degree Doctor of Osteopathic Medicine (D.O.). The college is accredited by the American Osteopathic Association. In 1993, Barbara Ross-Lee was appointed to the position of dean of the Heritage College of Osteopathic Medicine; she was the first African-American woman to serve as the dean of a U.S. medical school. In 2014, alongside pre-eminent training partner OhioHealth, the college opened a second medical school campus in Dublin, Ohio. In 2015, the college opened a third campus in affiliation with Cleveland Clinic at Cleveland Clinic South Pointe Hospital in Warrensville Heights, Ohio. Approximately 120 medical students train at the Athens campus, 70 in Dublin and 60 in Cleveland.

The College of Health Sciences and Professions was established in 1979, and is the home for departments of exercise physiology, dietetics and nutrition sciences, physical therapy, athletic training, health studies, nursing, rehabilitation and communications science, social and public health, and social work.

University College was established in 2004. The college comprises students who design a major program with faculty approval and awards the Bachelor of Specialized Studies (BSS) degree. The University College faculty are from various disciplines.

=== Research centers ===
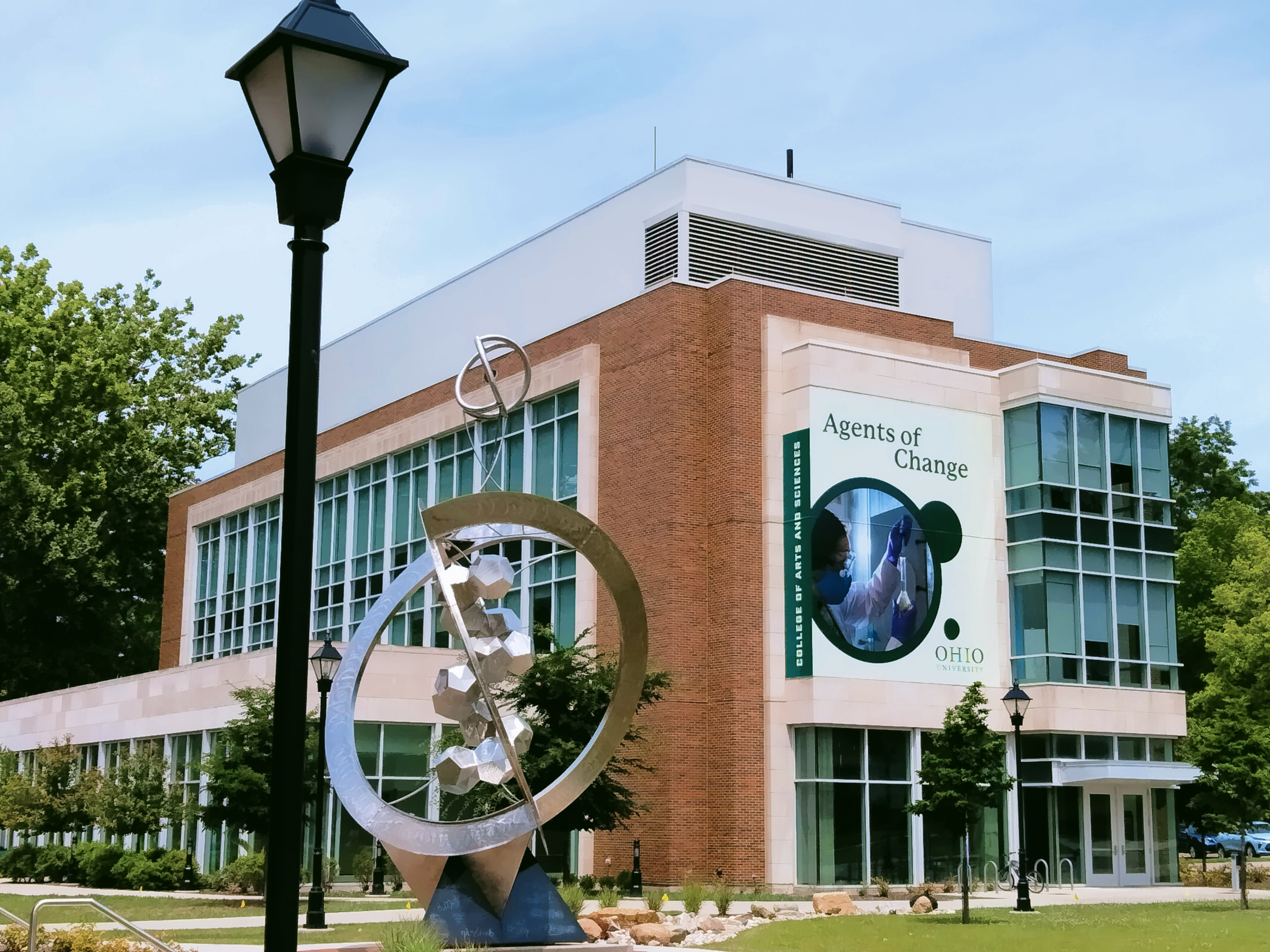
Chemistry Building

Several research programs and institutes allow students to learn from scientists and scholars who are actively engaged in advancing their disciplines. Ohio University's Board of Trustees-approved research centers and institutes cover a broad range of disciplines.

The College of Arts & Sciences sponsors the African American Research and Service Institute, the Astrophysical Institute, the Contemporary History Institute, the Charles J. Ping Institute for the Teaching of the Humanities, Center for Intelligent Chemical Instrumentation, the Nanoscale and Quantum Phenomena Institute, the Institute for Applied and Professional Ethics, Institute for the Empirical Study of Language, the Institute of Nuclear and Particle Physics, the Ohio University Cartographic Center, the Institute for Quantitative Biology, and the Center for Ring Theory and Its Applications. The Center for International Studies was established in 1964. The George Washington Forum on Ideas sponsors exchanges on a wide range of topics and the university launched the Global Leadership Center to engage students from any major in a wide variety of global impact projects during their studies.

The Heritage College of Osteopathic Medicine sponsors the Institute for Neuromusculoskeletal Research, Tropical Disease Institute, Edison Biotechnology Institute, and Appalachian Rural Health Institute.

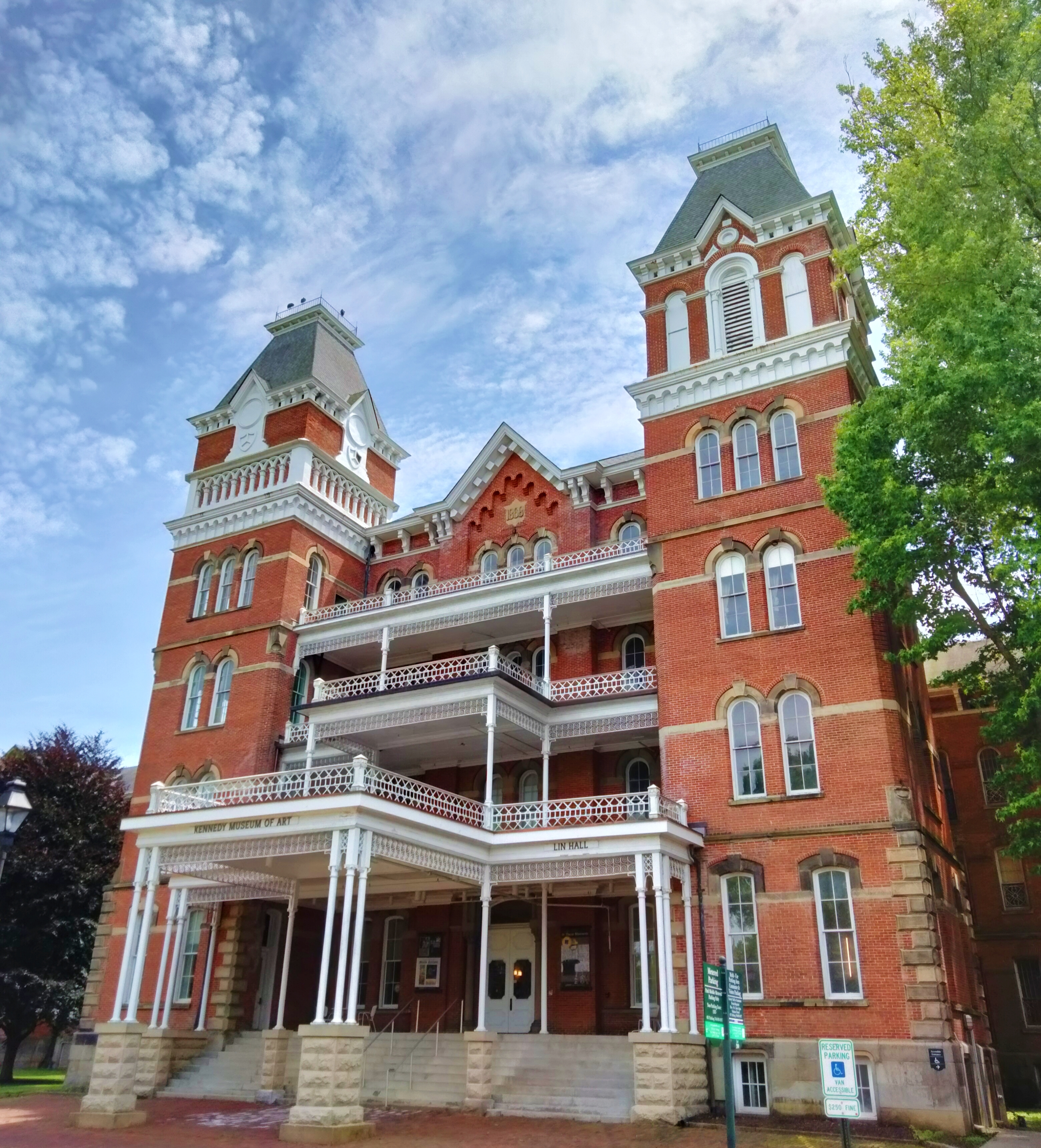
Kennedy Museum of Art at The Ridges

In Engineering and Technology, Ohio sponsors the Institute for Sustainable Energy and the Environment, the Center for Advanced Materials Processing, the Center for Advanced Software Systems Integration, the Automatic Identification Education and Research Center, the Avionics Engineering Research Center, the Institute for Corrosion & Multiphase Technology, the Center for Intelligent, Distributed and Dependable Systems, the Ohio Research Institute for Transportation and the Environment, and the T. Richard and Eleanora K. Robe Leadership Institute. The Condensed Matter and Surface Science program supports research in condensed matter and materials physics. The Nanoscale and Quantum Phenomena Institute (NQPI) supports research in diverse aspects of nanoscience and quantum mechanical phenomena in nature.

The College of Business sponsors the center for eBusiness, the Center for International Business Education and Development, the Center for Sports Administration, and the Schey Sales Center. The university also has a business incubator and innovation center.

In Scripps College of Communications disciplines, Ohio sponsors the Institute for International Journalism, the Scripps Survey Research Center, the Telecommunications Center, and the Institute for Telecommunication Studies. The College of Communication also sponsors the Game Research and Immersive Design (GRID) Lab, an initiative of its Scripps College of Communication, providing Ohioans the training, education, and opportunity to develop technical and creative skills with digital game technology. The GRID Lab serves as an innovative and creative center for undergraduate and graduate students, faculty, and staff research and project development. It was founded by various faculty and staff from the School of Media Arts and Studies.

In Education, Ohio sponsors the Center for Cooperative Curriculum Development and Partnerships, the Institute for Democracy in Education, the George Hill Center for Counseling & Research, the Center for Higher Education, the Child Development Center, and the Edward Stevens Center for the Study and Development of Literacy and Language.

=== Libraries ===
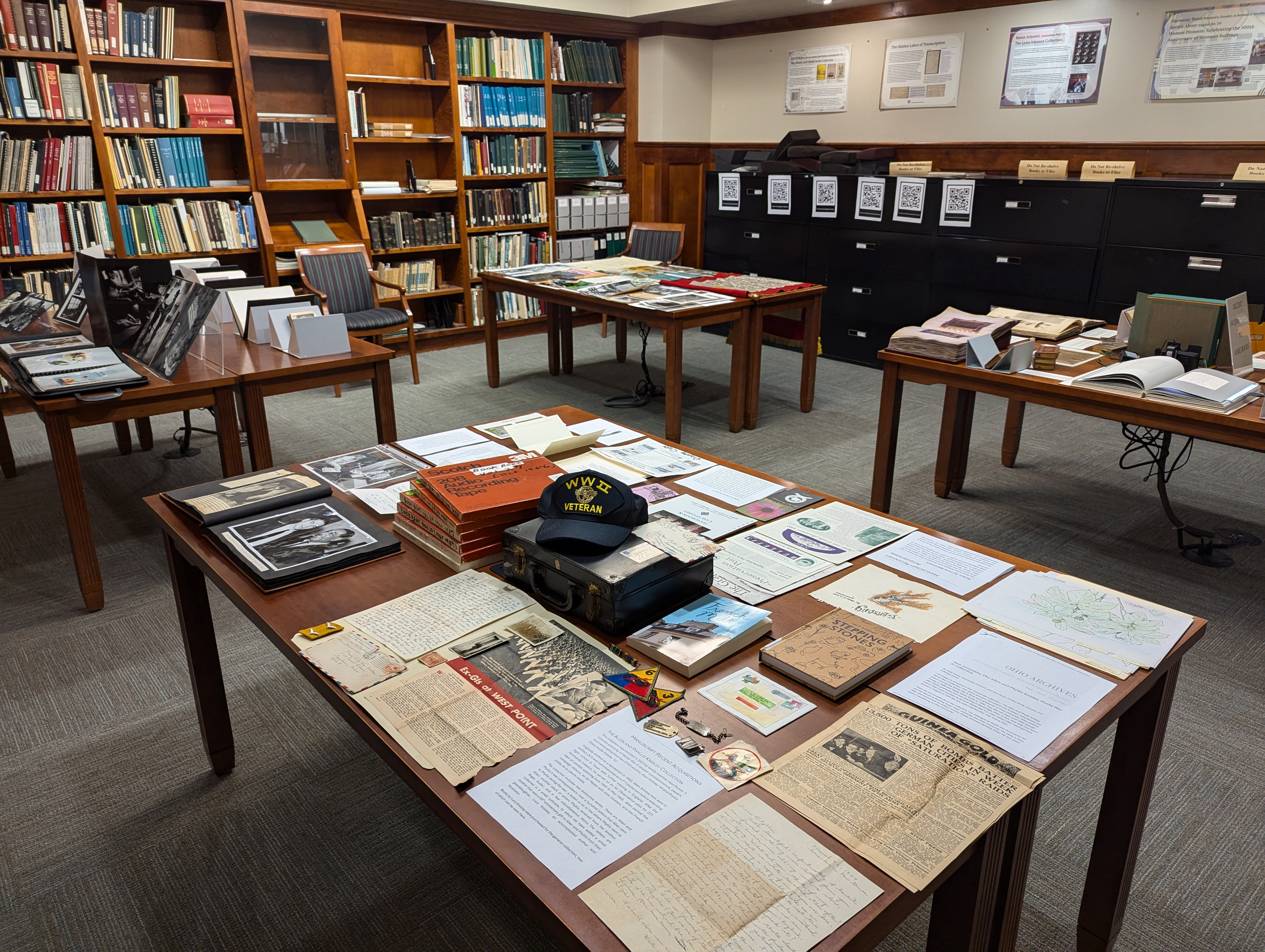
Alden Library Archives

Vernon R. Alden Library serves the Athens campus as the central academic library, staffed with research librarians. Several smaller libraries serve various departments, as well as collection libraries within the Alden Library building. Also housed within Alden Library is the Ohio University Press, Ohio University's publishing company. Each regional campus has its own library and printed text collections. The collection of Ohio University's library contains over 2.3 million units of microfilm material, 13,500 periodical subscriptions and more than 4 million printed volumes, making it one of the 100 largest libraries in the United States. Alden Library was the first in the world to generate an electronic library record in 1971. The university maintains a complex system of archives in its libraries. The Robert E. and Jean R. Mahn Center for Archives and Special Collections maintains and displays rare books and collections, including a 14th-century Gutenberg Bible. Laptops and other accessories are available through technology services at the reference desk. Outside Alden Library and directly behind Cutler Hall is Wolfe Garden, a small enclave in the shape of the State of Ohio, which features native Ohio trees and plants.

=== Law enforcement ===
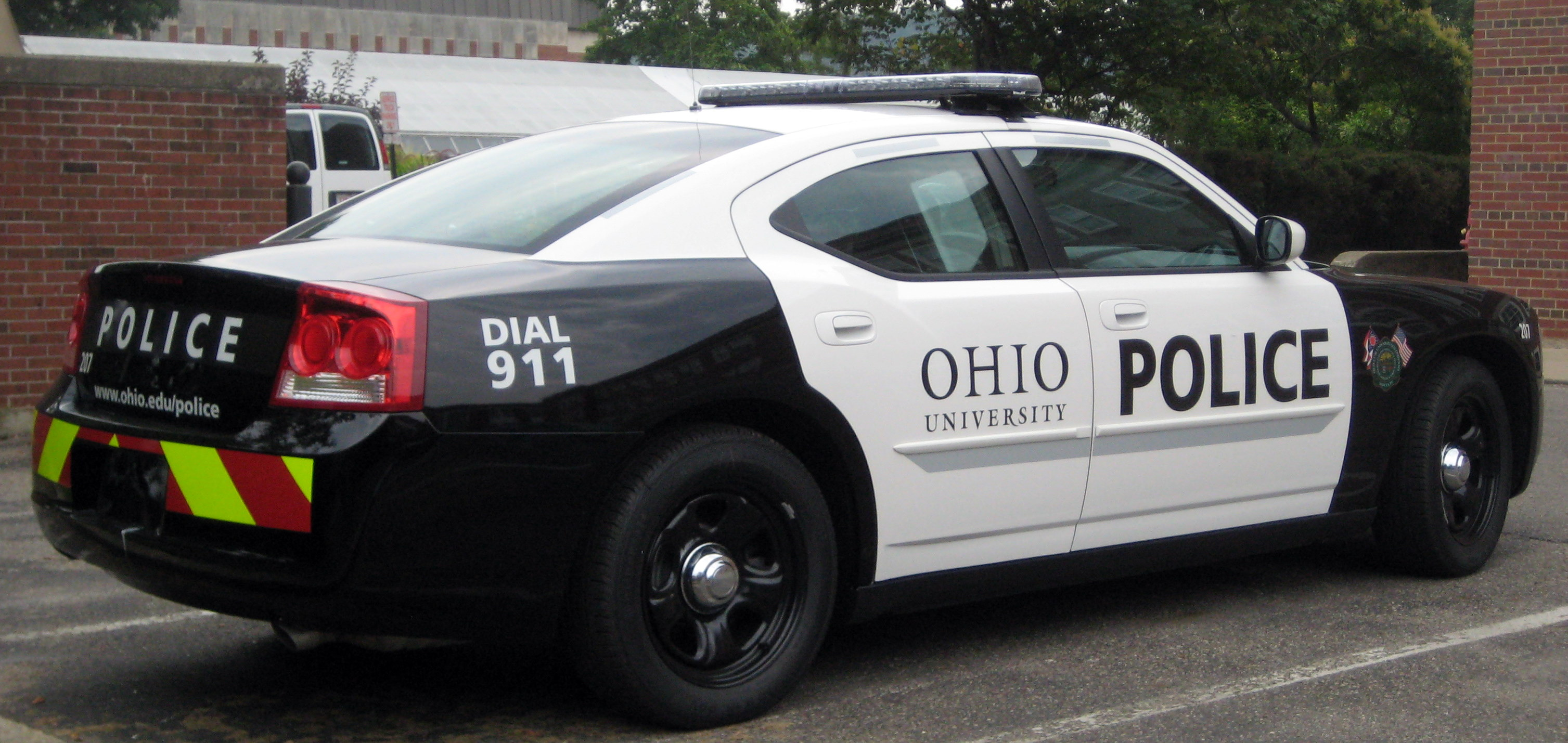
OUPD Police Charger

Ohio University operates its own campus police department. Operating out of 118 Ridges Circle (the Ridges, Building 13, first floor), the Ohio University Police Department (OUPD) is a fully-fledged, independent law enforcement agency with 31 sworn officers, 5 dispatchers, and 2 administrative support personnel. It has patrol and investigative divisions, two explosive detective canine teams, a SWAT team, and are members of the Athens-Hocking-Fairfield Major Crimes Unit. OUPD was certified with the Ohio Collaborative on January 27, 2017.

== Academics ==
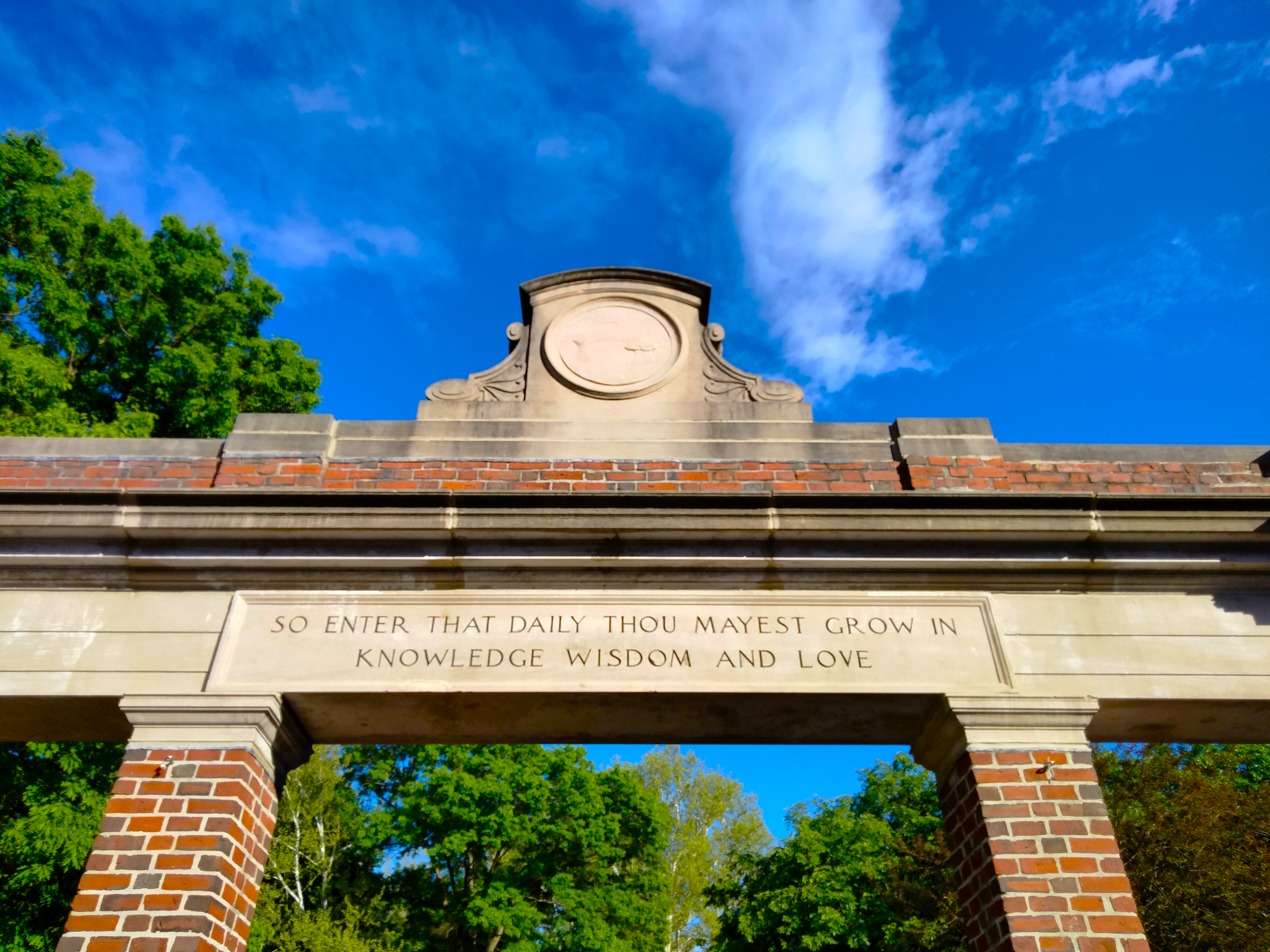
Alumni Gateway on College Green is the entrance way for freshmen upon their convocation.

Academe at Ohio University comprises its thirteen degree granting colleges and centers. The university honor code includes the traditional pillars of character, citizenship, civility, commitment, and community. Freshmen formally enter the university with their annual convocation and march beneath Alumni Gateway along with university officials. The university is nationally known for its liberal arts programs, as well as its journalism, business, and medicine programs. The total university student enrollment is in excess of 36,000, encompassing its main campus in Athens and regional campuses; its body mostly hails from the Mid-Atlantic and Midwest and graduated from public high schools. Undergraduate admissions are selective with further admission requirements for its journalism and other schools. The Heritage College of Osteopathic Medicine maintains separate select admissions criteria and is the most selective college at the university. Ohio University is accredited by the Higher Learning Commission and classified among "R1: Doctoral Universities – Very high research activity".

The Chronicle of Higher Education has recognized the university as one of the top producers of U.S. Fulbright scholars by type of institution, with the highest number of recipients in the state as well as the Mid-American Conference in 2011–12. Ohio University was recognized by the U.S. Department of State's Bureau of Educational and Cultural Affairs as a top producer of 2014–2015 Fulbright U.S. Students. Since 2008, 16 students have won the Barry M. Goldwater Scholarship, 32 students have won the NSF Graduate Research Fellowship Program and 94 students have become Fulbright Program U.S. grantees. One alumnus has shared the Nobel Prize. Ohio faculty has achievements ranging from the first university to successfully accomplish a trans-genetic DNA injection, to Francis Bundy's work on early synthesis of diamond to Paul Murray Kendall's celebrated biography of Richard III. Some sense of research achievements at Ohio University can be seen in the biographies of the Edwin and Ruth Kennedy Distinguished Professors appointed annually since 1959.

=== Undergraduate admissions ===
Undergraduate admissions statistics
- 2023 entering class
- Admit rate: 84.96% (▲ +6.66)
- Yield rate: 20.94% ( −0.76)

Test scores middle 50%
- SAT Total: 1100–1280 (among 13% of FTFs)
- ACT Composite: 22–28 (among 37% of FTFs)

The Princeton Review gives Ohio an "Admissions Selectivity Rating" of 85 on a scale of 60–99. The university extends offers of admission to, on average, around 85% of all applicants yearly after holistic review that includes examination of academic rigor, recommendations, essays, and high school performance, and admissions test scores, when submitted. The university no longer requires test scores and does not publish average tests scores for public release. Ohio University admitted 85% of all applicants, including first year and transfer students, for the incoming 2022 class.

The Class of 2026 enrolled as Ohio University's largest class, coming from all 50 states.

Academic rankings

National
- Forbes: Unranked
- U.S. News & World Report: 198 (tie)
- Washington Monthly: 231
- WSJ/College Pulse: 439

Global
- ARWU: 701-800
- QS: 1001-1200
- THE: 601-800
- U.S. News & World Report: 810 (tie)

National Rankings by Subject (as of 2025)
Program	Ranking
Audiology	61 (tie)
Biological Sciences	186 (tie)
Business	122-133
Chemistry	119 (tie)
Clinical Psychology	91 (tie)
Computer Science	148 (tie)
Education	138 (tie)
Engineering	149 (tie)
English	90 (tie)
Fine Arts	32 (tie)
History	86 (tie)
Mathematics	144 (tie)
Medicine: Primary Care	Tier 3
Medicine: Research	Tier 4
Physical Therapy	50 (tie)
Physicians Assistant	119 (tie)
Physics	95 (tie)
Psychology	124 (tie)
Public Affairs	70 (tie)
Rehabilitation Counseling	33 (tie)
Social Work	120 (tie)
Speech-Language Pathology	60 (tie)

Global Rankings by Subject (as of 2025)
Program	Ranking
Clinical Medicine	610 (tie)
Physics	640 (tie)
Psychiatry/Psychology	424 (tie)
Social Sciences & Public Health	563

== Student life ==
Undergraduate demographics as of Fall 2023
Race and ethnicity	Total
White	82%
Black	5%
Hispanic	5%
Two or more races	4%
Asian	2%
Unknown	2%
International student	1%
Economic diversity
Low-income (Note: The percentage of students who received an income-based federal Pell grant intended for low-income students.)	21%
Affluent (Note: The percentage of students who are a part of the American middle class at the bare minimum.)	79%

=== Traditions ===
==== Marching 110 Band ====
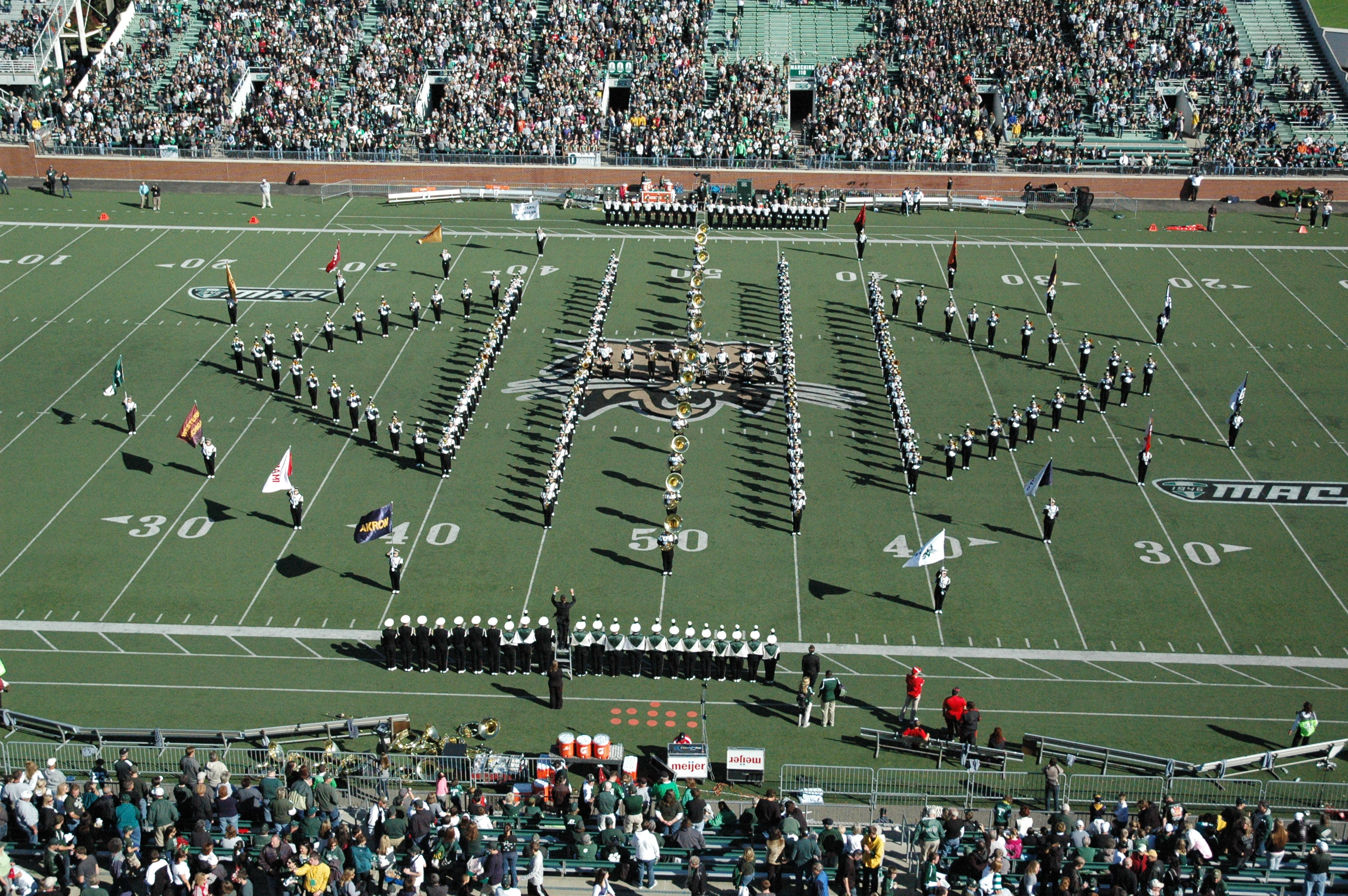
Ohio University Marching 110 Diamond Ohio formation

The Ohio University Marching 110 is the official marching band of Ohio University, founded in 1923 and based out of the College of Fine Arts. The nickname Marching 110 is a reference to the band's original number of members; modern bands consist of approximately 225 members. The 110 represents the university at various athletic functions and other events. The Marching 110 became the first collegiate marching band to perform in Carnegie Hall in 1976. In January 1993, the 110 performed in Bill Clinton's first inaugural parade through Washington, D.C., after Clinton asked campaign chairman and Ohio University alumnus David Wilhelm for the band to perform. Other notable performances include the Macy's Thanksgiving Day Parade in 2000, 2005, and 2017, as well as the 2010 Rose Parade.

==== Special Events ====
Athens' annual Halloween block party is the most well-known and far-reaching tradition, with Ohio University providing support services for the thousands of partiers who attend. Among more traditions which students enjoy being involved in each year are Homecoming Weekend, with its grand parade through the streets of Athens and activities that allow students to mingle with alumni. International Week in the Spring features another colorful parade and festivities along Court Street. The Student Activities Commission (SAC) sponsors a yearly springtime concert with prominent musicians, usually held at the Convocation Center. The university community is well known for its unofficial springtime fests and concerts, as well. Other traditions include the Kissing Circle on College Green, a tradition where couples will kiss on College Green to solidify their relationship so it becomes a "Bobcat Bond;" the week of Hellenic "rushing" in the Fall, for freshmen to become sorority and fraternity members; and the entire month of April featuring ecological advocacy and green awareness programs across all campuses.

=== Service ===
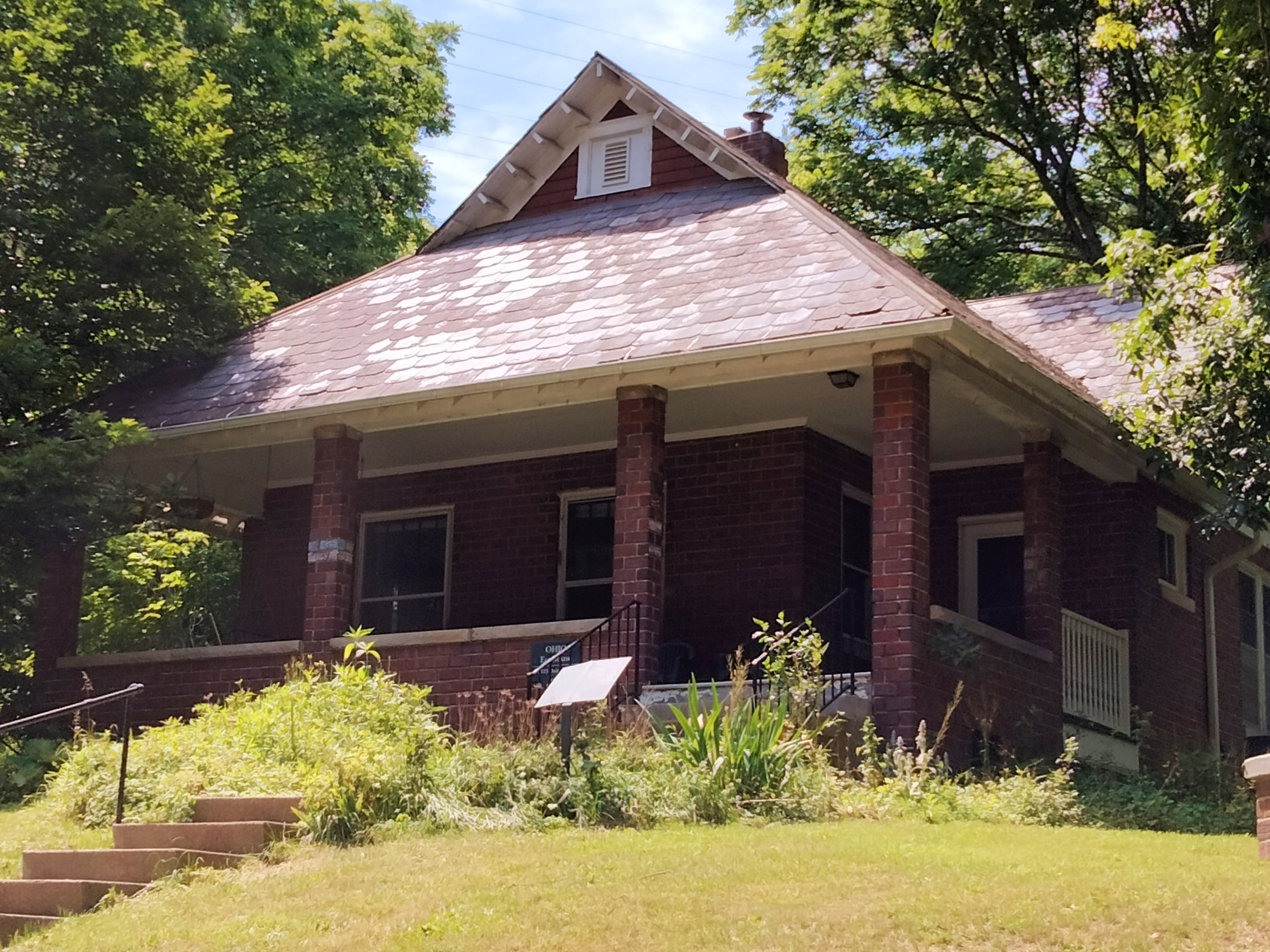
Ecohouse is a student residence and service center for ecological wellbeing.

Students maintain a variety of organized and independent service events. The Community Service Leadership Council involves students to oversee a Project of the Week every Saturday. The projects have included work with Good Earth Farms, Last Chance Corral, Cadillac Ranch, Habitat for Humanity, Alpha Delta Pi, Alpha Phi Omega, Pi Beta Phi, Project C, Rotaract, the Survivor Advocacy Program, and the Thursday Supper Volunteer Corps, among others. Charities at Ohio University have involved flag football tournaments and the 5K Flour Run, and have benefited O'Bleness Health System's Women's Health Fund and the Athens Backpack Program, respectively. Student Senate's Beautification Day regularly receives a large turnout and is particularly unique in the Spring. In early 1962, President Vernon Alden signed the first of several contracts with the federal government to facilitate Peace Corps volunteer training programs. Today, Ohio University hosts a recruiting office for the Peace Corps in a tradition affiliated with that organization since Sargent Shriver's visit.

=== Media ===
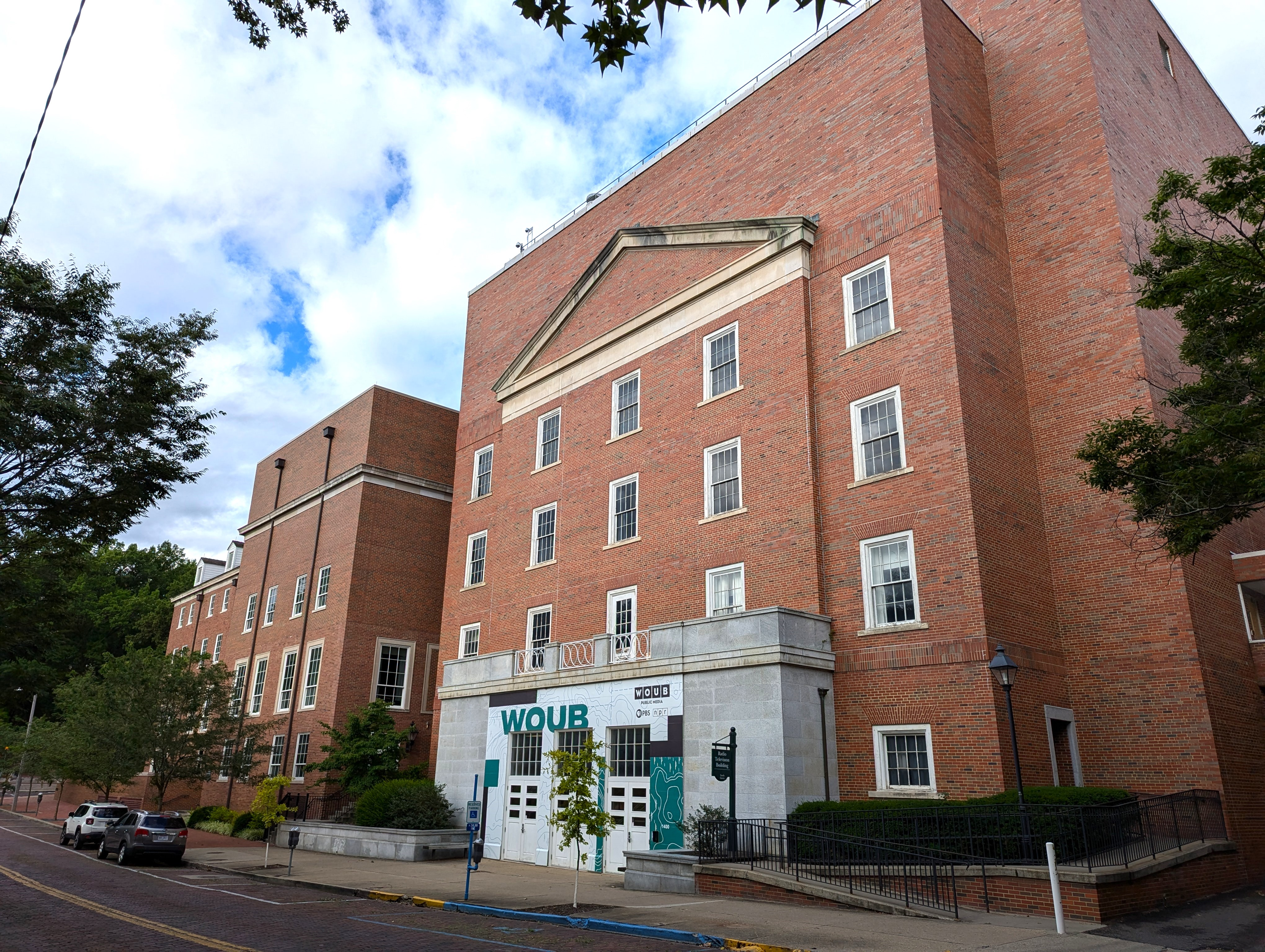
Home of WOUB, connected to the Scripps College of Communication Schoonover Center.

The university operates the Ohio University Press, publishing on a range of subjects. Students operate a newspaper, television, radio stations, numerous online sites, among more media, at Ohio University. The main newspaper, The Post, publishes in print once a week and online all days of the week while the university is in session, and is officially independent of the university and its administration. Ohio University Public Television is a PBS affiliate broadcasting on WOUB Athens/WOUC Cambridge. In addition to national PBS programs, WOUB features Newswatch, a nightly news broadcast with student reporters. Other student-produced programs include Gridiron Glory (following the Southeastern Ohio and parts of West Virginia high school football season, the recipient of many Emmys) and Bobcat Blitz (following the Ohio Bobcats during the year). WOUB also airs The OUtlet, a radio show and podcast featuring stories wherever "campus meets community." WOUB-FM 91.3 Athens, WOUC-FM 89.1 Cambridge, WOUH-FM 91.9 Chillicothe, WOUL-FM 89.1 Ironton, and WOUZ-FM 90.1 Zanesville broadcast the same programs throughout southeastern Ohio. Separate public radio programming is also heard in Athens on WOUB AM 1340. ACRN ("The Rock Lobster"), founded in 1971, is an Internet radio-only station and the university's only student-run radio station. Ohio University has an amateur radio (also known as ham radio) club, the Ohio University Amateur Radio Club, call sign W8PZS, that operates out of Stocker Center. The New Political is a web publication with the latest news on campus and state politics. Thread Magazine is the fashion quarterly and Backdrop is the campus periodical about pop culture; both are written by undergraduates. OHIO Today is the official university magazine for alumni and friends, and OHIO Women is its female-reader digest. The university also publishes the OHIO News page, the institution's official online news and information resource. OHIO Forum is the official online publication of the College of Arts & Sciences. OIT (Ohio Information Technology) is the university tech depot and help desk, responsible for a wide range of duties from CatMail (campus email) to hosting official websites.

== Athletics ==
Ohio University sports began in 1894 with an 8–0 loss to Marietta College in football. The university competes in the major National Collegiate Athletic Association (NCAA) at the Division I level and is a charter member of the Mid-American Conference (MAC), established in 1946, and remains the sole charter member competing in the conference. University intercollegiate athletics include six men's squads and eight women's squads. All university sporting events are open to students at no additional charge. Ohio's men's and women's athletics teams compete under the official colors of hunter green and white. The school mascot is Rufus the Bobcat, and a life-sized sculpture of a bobcat stands poised at the entrance to Peden Stadium.

There are 36 active club sports programs at Ohio, run out of the Department of Campus Recreation. Club sports include sports for all genders, including co-ed sports.

Ohio University fosters a complementary relationship with Miami University, highlighted by the Battle of the Bricks.

=== Basketball ===
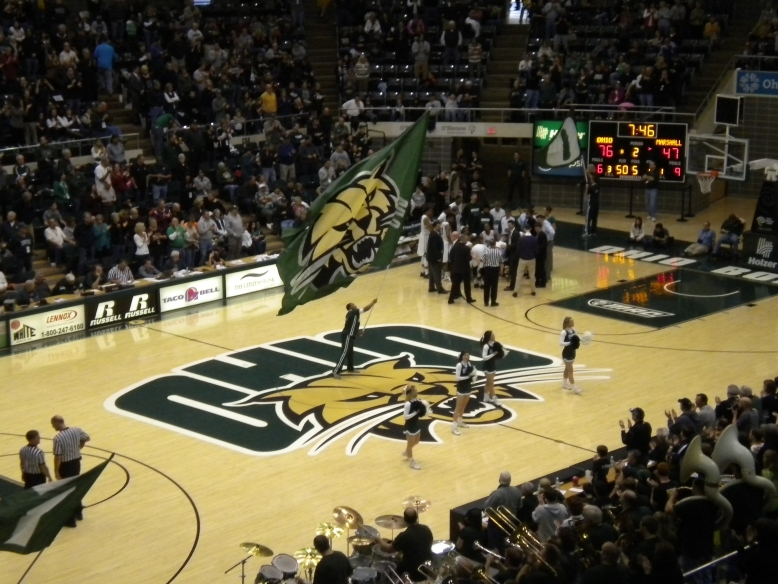
Ohio men's basketball facing off against the Marshall Thundering Herd at the Convocation Center in 2013

The 13,080-seat Convocation Center serves as home to the university's men's and women's basketball teams, as well as women's volleyball teams.

The first Ohio basketball game occurred in 1907 when the Bobcats defeated the Parkersburg YMCA 46–9. Since that day, Ohio has posted a .571 winning percentage over their 100-year history and a .566 winning percentage in their 65 years in the Mid-American Conference. The Bobcats have won 7 Mid-American Conference tournament titles in 1983, 1985, 1994, 2005, 2010, 2012, and 2021; as well as 10 MAC regular-season titles in 1960, 1961, 1964, 1965, 1970, 1972, 1974, 1985, 1994, and 2013. In addition, Ohio has played in the NCAA tournament 14 times, appearing in 1960, 1961, 1964, 1965, 1970, 1972, 1974, 1983, 1985, 1994, 2005, 2010, 2012, and 2021. The Bobcats have been selected for the National Invitation Tournament 5 times in 1941 (runner-up), 1969, 1986, 1995, and 2013, while also appearing in the College Basketball Invitational in 2008 and 2016, they made 2 appearances in the CollegeInsider.com Postseason Tournament in 2011 and 2014. Prior to joining the MAC, the 'Cats won an Ohio Athletic Conference title in 1921 and three Buckeye Athletic Association championships in 1931, 1933, and 1937. As a result of the storied tradition of Ohio Bobcats basketball, the program was recently ranked 86th in Street & Smith's 100 Greatest Basketball Programs of All Time, published in 2005.

The team has won three MAC Tournaments (1986, 1995, 2015) since beginning play in 1973 and starting MAC play in 1982. They have reached the NCAA Tournament in those three championship years. They have four MAC conferences (1986, 1995, 2015, 2016) and four-division championships (2015, 2016, 2019, 2020).The women's team was the first team to win 30 games during the 2018-19 season going 30-6 losing in the quarterfinals of the 2019 WNIT.

=== Football ===
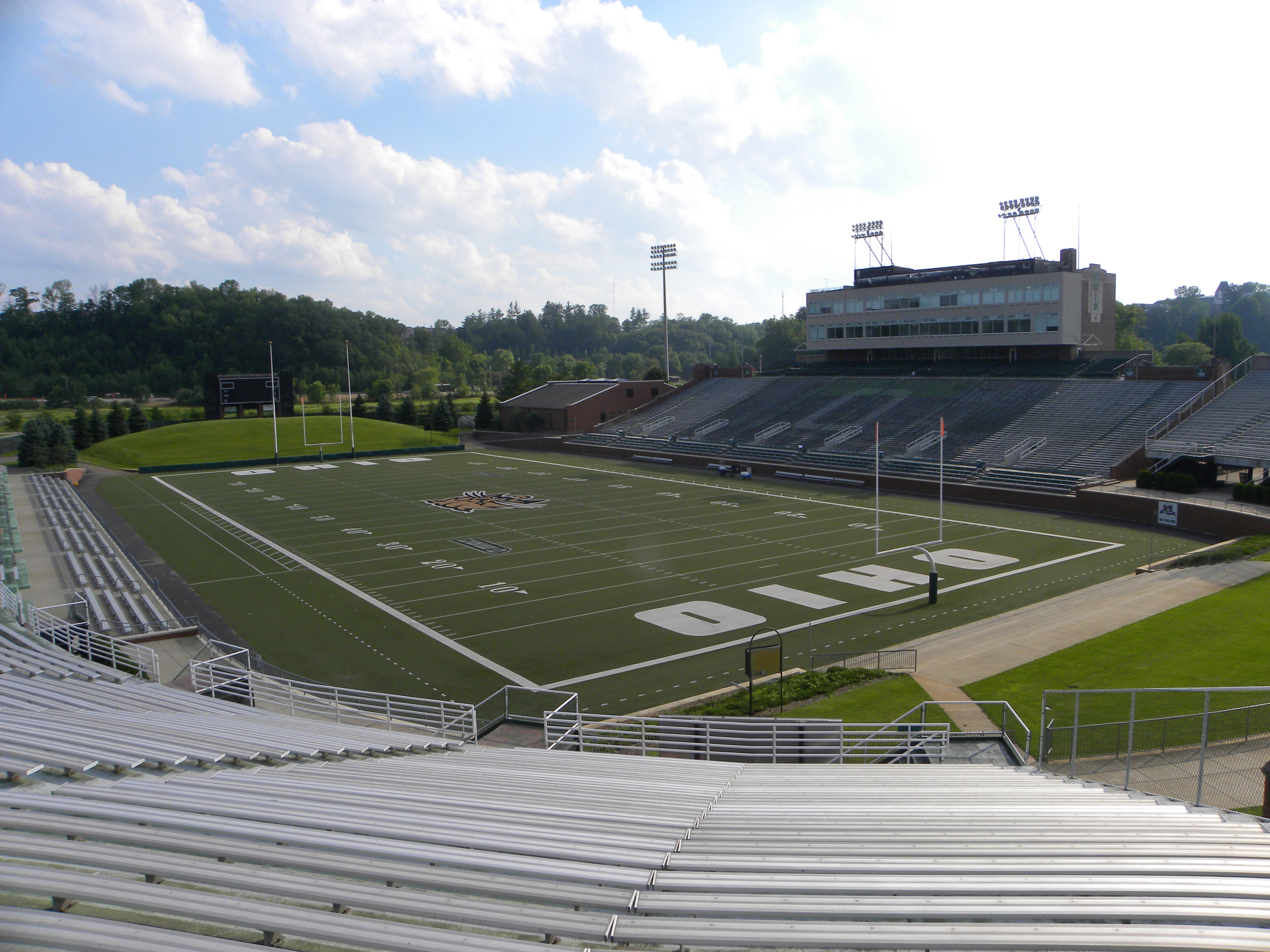
Peden Stadium, home to the Ohio Bobcats football team, was built 1929 and is among the oldest football venues.

Ohio Bobcats football began in 1894 with an 8–0 loss to Marietta College. Since 1894, the Bobcats have posted a 584–580–65 (.502) record and a 252–248–12 record in the Mid-American Conference. Peden Stadium, built in 1929, is the oldest football venue in the MAC and among the oldest in the nation. Located on the south of Ohio University's campus in Athens, the venue has a seating capacity of 27,000, with the addition of the Sook Student Center at south end of the stadium. As such, Peden Stadium is nicknamed "The Wrigley Field of College Football". The stadium brought its largest crowd on September 6, 2025 when 26,740 watched the Bobcats defeat West Virginia 17-10.

The Bobcats have won six MAC Football championships in 1953, 1960, 1963, 1967,1968,and 2024; and MAC East Division championships in 2006, 2009, and 2011. Prior to joining the MAC, the Bobcats won six Buckeye Athletic Association championships in 1929, 1930, 1931, 1935, 1936, and 1938. In 1960, the Bobcats were crowned National Small College Champions after compiling a 10–0 record under Coach Bill Hess. The Bobcats have appeared in several bowl games, losing 15–14 to West Texas State in the 1962 Sun Bowl, losing 49–42 to Richmond in the 1968 Tangerine Bowl, falling 28–7 to Southern Mississippi in the 2007 GMAC Bowl, losing 21–17 to Marshall in the 2009 Little Caesars Pizza Bowl, and losing to Troy in the 2010 New Orleans Bowl, 48–21, before finally winning a bowl game in the 2011 Famous Idaho Potato Bowl against Utah State, 24–23. The Bobcats took down the Wyoming Cowboys in the 2022 Barstool Sports Arizona Bowl 30–27 in overtime; they defeated the Georgia Southern Eagles with a score of 41–21 in the Myrtle Beach Bowl in 2023.

== Notable people ==
Ohio University has over 300,000 living alumni. Presidents of countries, Nobel Prize winners, senators, Pulitzer Prize winners, generals and astronauts are counted among its ranks. Among these distinguished alumni are CBS Weekend News anchor Jericka Duncan; Worldwalker Steve Newman; Loring Miner, who discovered the Spanish flu; Venkatraman Ramakrishnan, recipient of the 2009 Nobel Prize in Chemistry and president of the Royal Society; George Voinovich, former Ohio governor and U.S. senator for Ohio; and Thomas Ewing, first graduate of Ohio University, the first Secretary of the Interior, a U.S. senator for Ohio and Secretary of the Treasury under U.S. President William Henry Harrison. Eighty-four Scripps College of Communication alumni have won or contributed to Pulitzer Prizes.
