= Ohio University College of Arts and Sciences =

College of Ohio University

The Ohio University College of Arts & Sciences is the college of arts and sciences at Ohio University, a public research university in Athens, Ohio. The original of the university's eleven academic colleges, it is centrally located in Wilson Hall on the College Green. The college features twenty organized academic departments. Additionally, it hosts two centers for its International Studies and Law, Justice & Culture programs. OHIO Forum is the official online publication of the College of Arts & Sciences.

== History ==
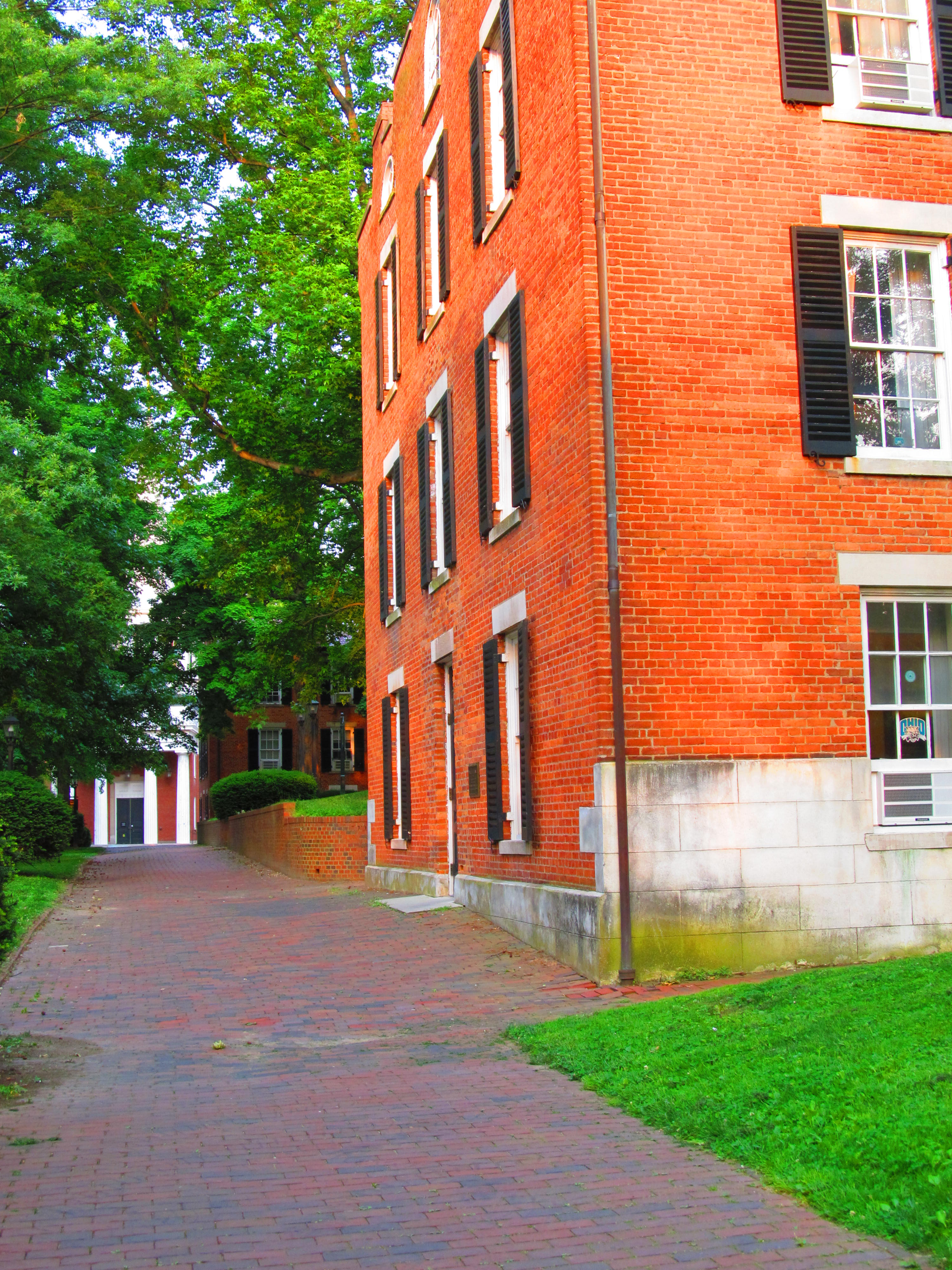
McGuffey Hall in the foreground and Wilson Hall in the background, home of the College.

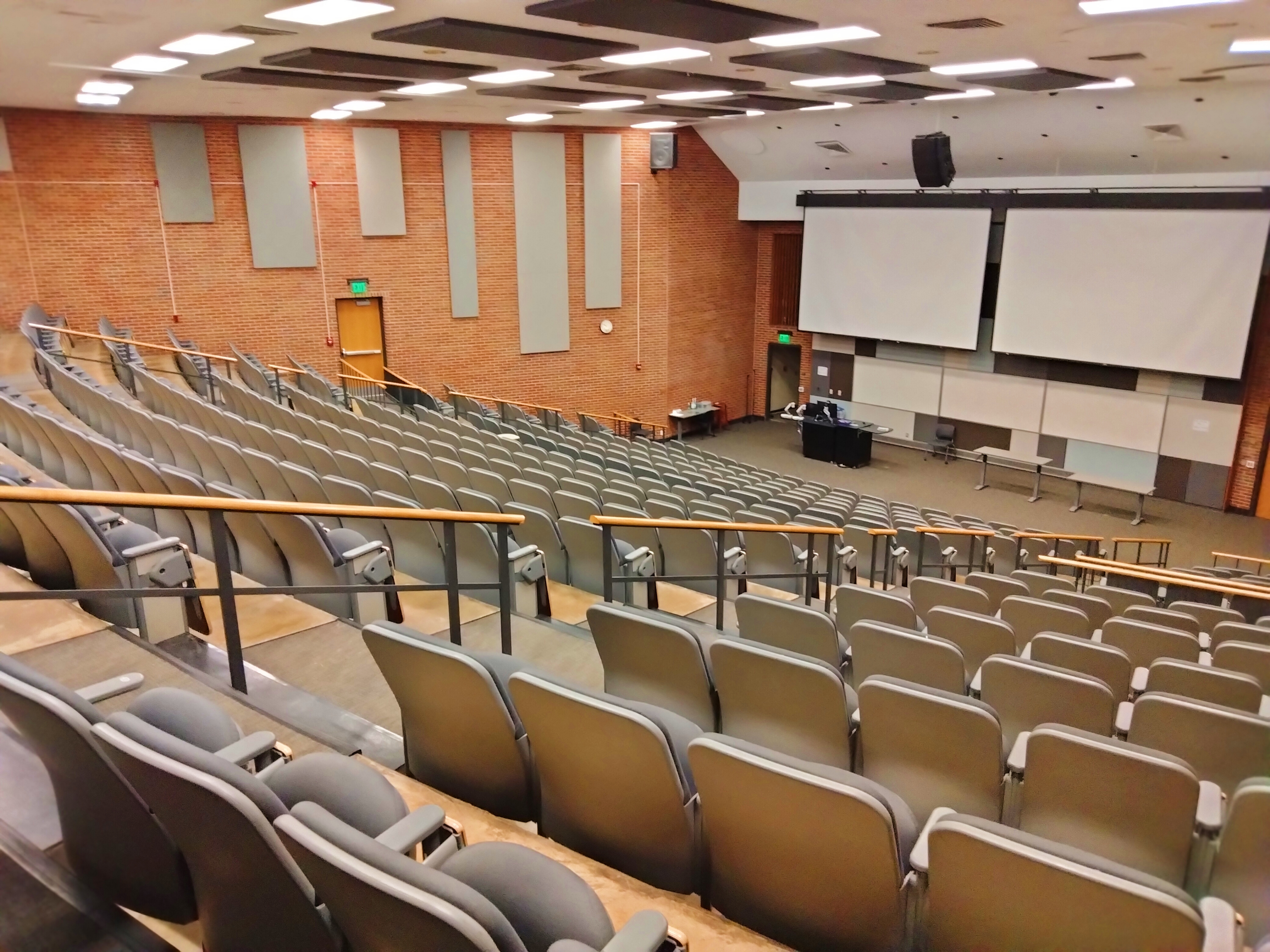
A lecture hall in Morton Hall used for arts and sciences instruction.

The first diplomas awarded by Ohio University, two in all, were Bachelor of Arts and Science degrees. The university's first course offerings included Latin, Greek, rhetoric, English grammar, geography, logic, philosophy, literature, classics, astronomy, and various branches of mathematics, all of which still are offered in the College of Arts & Sciences. But since a liberal arts curriculum was all the university offered, the College of Arts & Sciences did not exist as a discrete entity until the university grew to include other colleges; it became a truly separate college—the College of Liberal Arts—in 1902.

== Departments ==
Undergraduate students depend on the College of Arts & Sciences for a range of courses in the liberal arts, including required coursework in the humanities, the social sciences, and the natural sciences as the foundation for any degree they pursue within the university. Faculty in this college contribute substantial amounts of literature through Ohio University Press and imprint Swallow Press. The college features:

- African American Studies
- Biological Sciences
- Center for International Studies
- Center for Law, Justice & Culture (Undergraduate Certificate and freestanding M.A. program)
- Chemistry & Biochemistry
- Classics & Religious Studies
- Economics
- English Language & English Literature
- Environmental & Plant Biology
- Geography
- Geological Sciences
- History
- Linguistics
- Mathematics
- Modern Languages
- Ohio Program of Intensive English (OPIE)
- Philosophy
- Physics & Astronomy
- Political Science
- Psychology
- Sociology & Anthropology
- Women's, Gender & Sexuality Studies

== Research centers ==
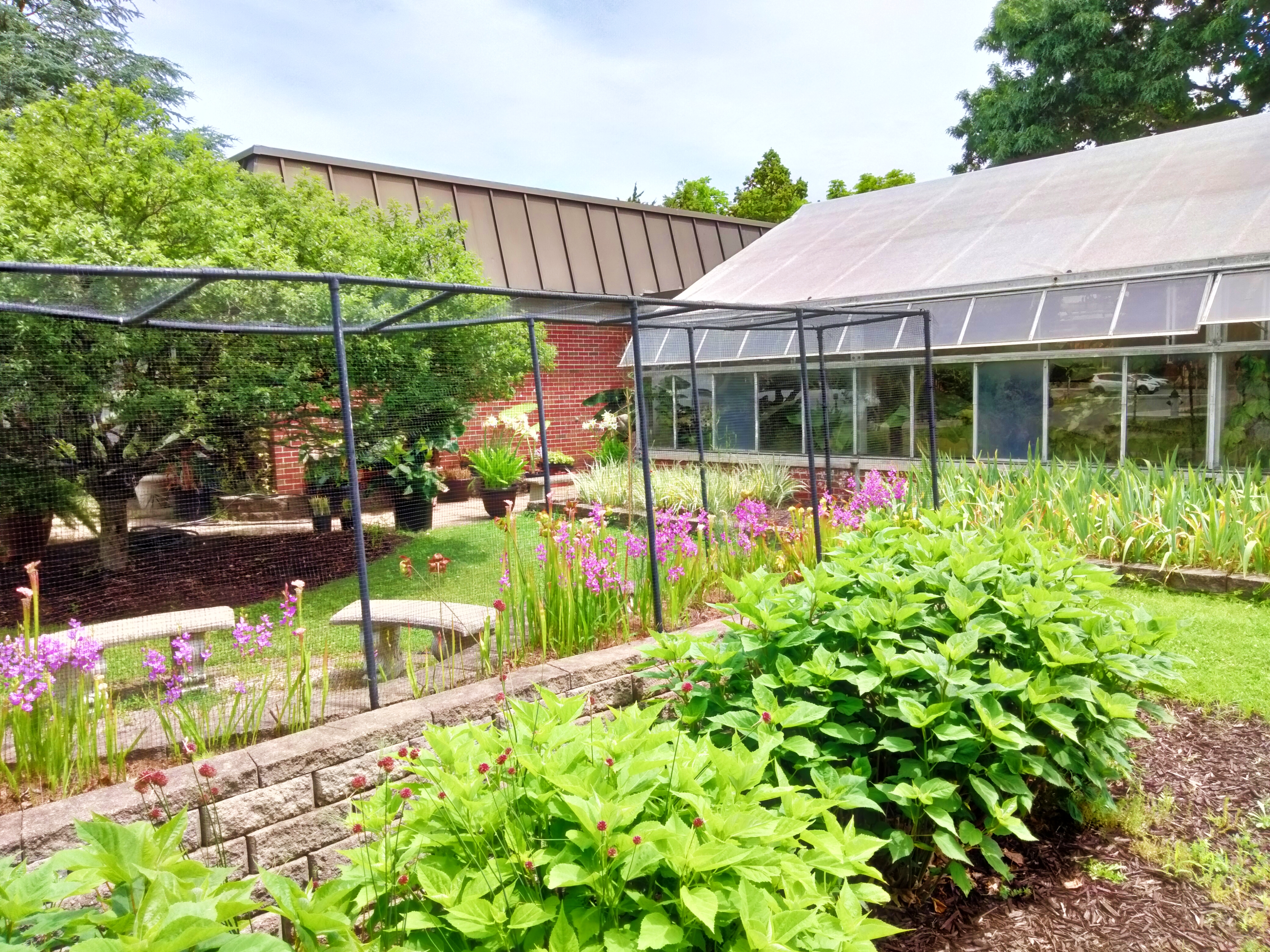
Ohio University Greenhouse

=== College-wide ===
- The George Washington Forum on Ideas sponsors exchanges on a wide range of analytics, debates, and topics.
- The Center for International Studies was established in 1964.
- The Global Leadership Center engages students from any major in a wide variety of global impact projects during their studies.
- The Center for Law, Justice and Culture examines cultural aspects of law and society.

=== Departmental institutes ===
Within its departments, the College sponsors:

- The African American Research and Service Institute
- The Astrophysical Institute
- The Center for Intelligent Chemical Instrumentation
- The Center for Ring Theory and Its Applications
- The Charles J. Ping Institute for the Teaching of the Humanities
- The Contemporary History Institute
- The Institute for Applied and Professional Ethics
- The Institute for Quantitative Biology
- The Institute for the Empirical Study of Language
- The Institute of Nuclear and Particle Physics
- The Nanoscale and Quantum Phenomena Institute
- The Ohio University Cartographic Center
- The Ohio University Greenhouse

== See also ==
- College of arts and sciences
- History of Ohio University
- College Green of Ohio University
- List of Ohio University alumni
- List of Ohio University faculty
- Ohio University Russ College of Engineering and Technology
- E. W. Scripps School of Journalism
