= Ohio University Russ College of Engineering and Technology =

College of Ohio University

Coordinates: 39.3256°N 82.1072°W

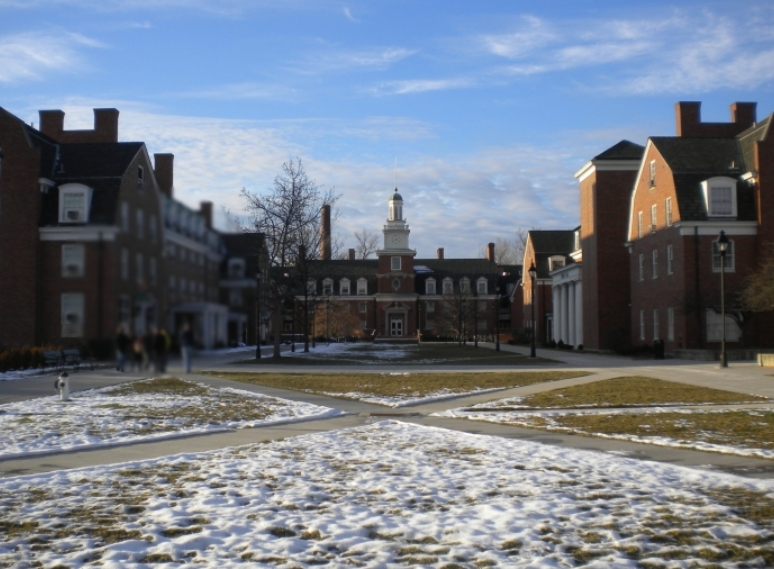
Stocker Center, center, is the Russ College's seat on West Green.

The Russ College of Engineering and Technology is the engineering college of Ohio University, a public research university in Athens, Ohio. It opened in 1920 as the second distinct college established at the university and is now one of the university's eleven academic colleges. It is located on the West Green. The Russ College is home to the university's highly ranked programs in the traditional fields of engineering at the undergraduate and graduate level. It enrolls approximately 1,400 undergraduates and almost 300 graduate students. It is named in honor of Fritz J. Russ, an alumnus in electrical engineering and the founder of Systems Research Laboratories, a major bioengineering concern. The Russ College maintains a close relationship with the College of Arts & Sciences due to its requirements in mathematics, hard sciences, and other courses.

== Departments ==
- Aviation (see Gordon K. Bush Airport)
- Chemical and Biomolecular Engineering
- Civil and Environmental Engineering
- Electrical Engineering and Computer Science
- Engineering Technology and Management
- Industrial and Systems Engineering
- Mechanical Engineering

== Research centers ==
- Automatic Identification Education and Research Center
- Avionics Engineering Research Center
- Center for Advanced Materials Processing
- Center for Advanced Software Systems Integration
- Center for Intelligent, Distributed and Dependable Systems
- Institute for Corrosion & Multiphase Technology
- Institute for Sustainable Energy and the Environment
- Ohio Research Institute for Transportation and the Environment
- T. Richard and Eleanora K. Robe Leadership Institute
- The Condensed Matter and Surface Science
- The Nanoscale and Quantum Phenomena Institute

== Academic and Research Center Building ==
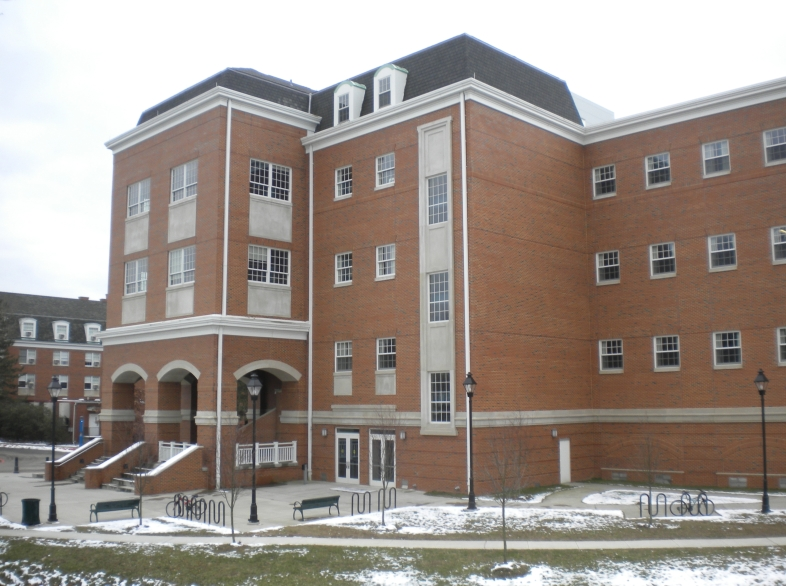
The Academic and Research Center is the largest building of its kind in Ohio.

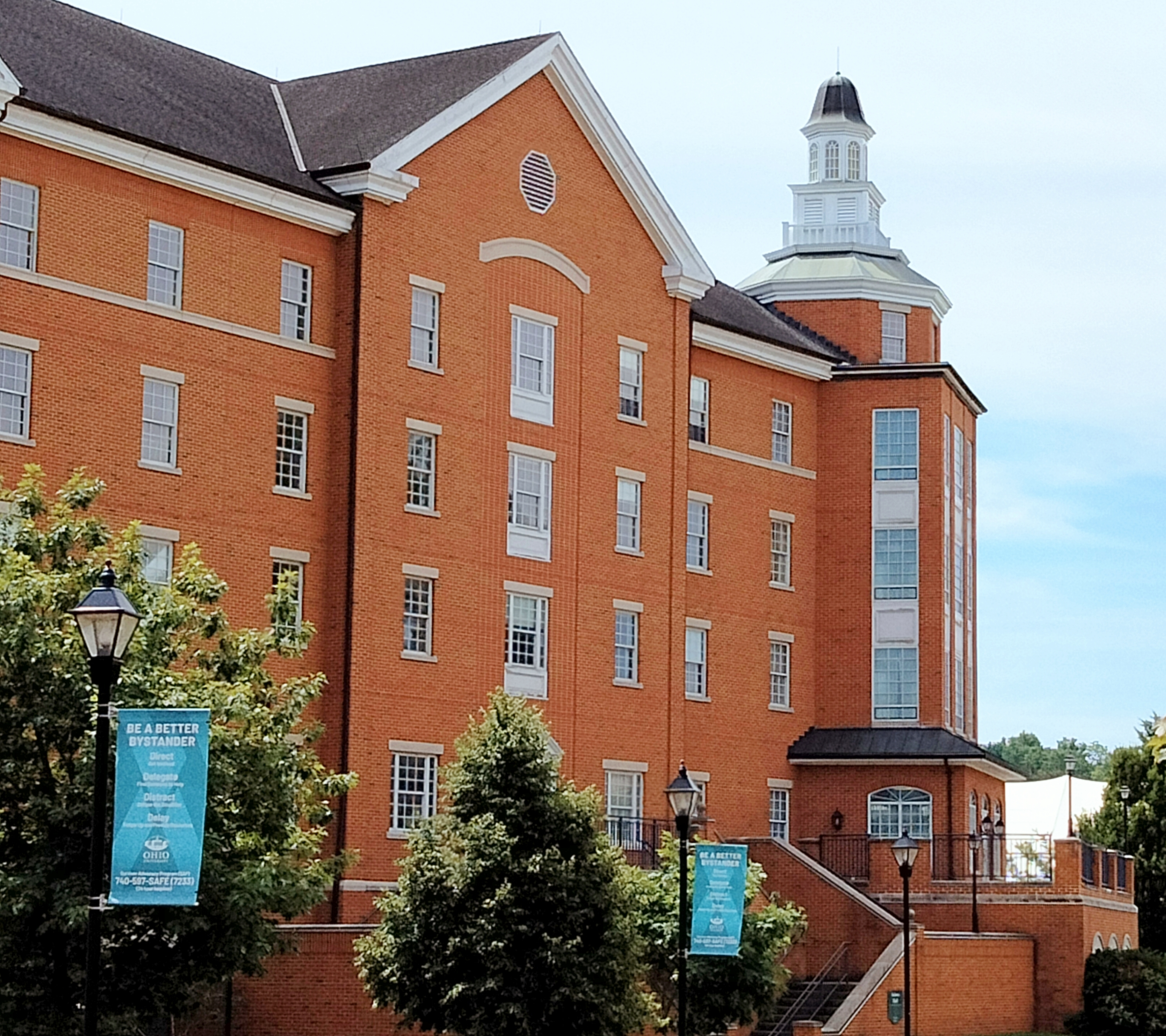
The ARC Building was designed in similar style as Adams Hall (pictured); note the matching cement work which accents the red brick.

The Academic and Research Center, or ARC Building, of Ohio University, is a research center built in 2009 and first used in January 2010. The Academic and Research Center is located to the northeast of Stocker Engineering and Technology Center, in the West Green, between coordinates E-3 and F-3 on the official university map. It is marked as #184 on the map.

=== Funding ===
The $34.5 million ARC building is one of only four university buildings financed primarily through private donations. The Osteopathic Heritage Foundations contributed $10 million toward construction, and Board of Trustees member and Russ College alumnus Charles Stuckey and his wife, Marilyn, donated $5 million. In total, more than $22 million was raised from more than 550 individuals, corporations, alumni, and friends of OU-COM and the Russ College.

=== Architecture ===
The ARC building, in addition to Baker University Center and Adams Hall, is one of several new buildings to feature Federalist architecture, as demonstrated in brick and stone cement work. The ARC building connects both Stocker Center and Irvine Hall, making it easy for collaborating researchers to work together.

The building has 13 classrooms. The Academic and Research Center now contains all of the Russ College's learning space and connects several of the college's administrative and West Green's various other facilities. The architecture and interior design were developed with collaboration in mind. Almost all of the furniture in the ARC is mobile, easily creating group spaces, and smaller study nooks with comfortable chairs and tables distributed throughout the building.

=== Research ===
Ten researchers from the Russ College and Heritage College of Osteopathic Medicine tackle major health and technology issues in the 22 laboratory spaces, with one floor devoted to diabetes research and one floor devoted to cancer research. There are also additional laboratories set aside for the recruitment of further research talents to Ohio University.

=== Student activity ===
Students working on large-scale projects make use of a two-story, 2,000-square-foot (190 m^{2}) project hangar in the ARC, which features a five-ton-capacity crane and floor hatch that can accommodate automobiles and move equipment inside or out.

== See also ==
- List of engineering schools
- History of Ohio University
- Science, Technology, Engineering, and Math
- List of Ohio University alumni
- List of Ohio University faculty
- Ohio University College of Arts and Sciences
- Heritage College of Osteopathic Medicine
