= History of Ohio University =

Ohio University was first conceived in the 1787 contract between the Board of Treasury of the United States and the Ohio Company of Associates, which set aside the College Lands to support a university, and subsequently approved by the territorial legislature in 1802 and the Ohio General Assembly in 1804, opening for students in 1809. It was the first university to be established in the former Northwest Territory. (Note: Vincennes University was created as a high school academy in 1801, but was not made the Indiana territory's first (and first public) university until 1806, two years after Ohio University's final approval.) The history of Ohio University predates its founding, as a part of the post-Revolutionary period that saw the nation's first land grants and continues through stages of conflict and change into standardization, digital advents, widespread research, and its present survival with strategic research, retrenchment, and impactful upgrades.

== America's experiment ==
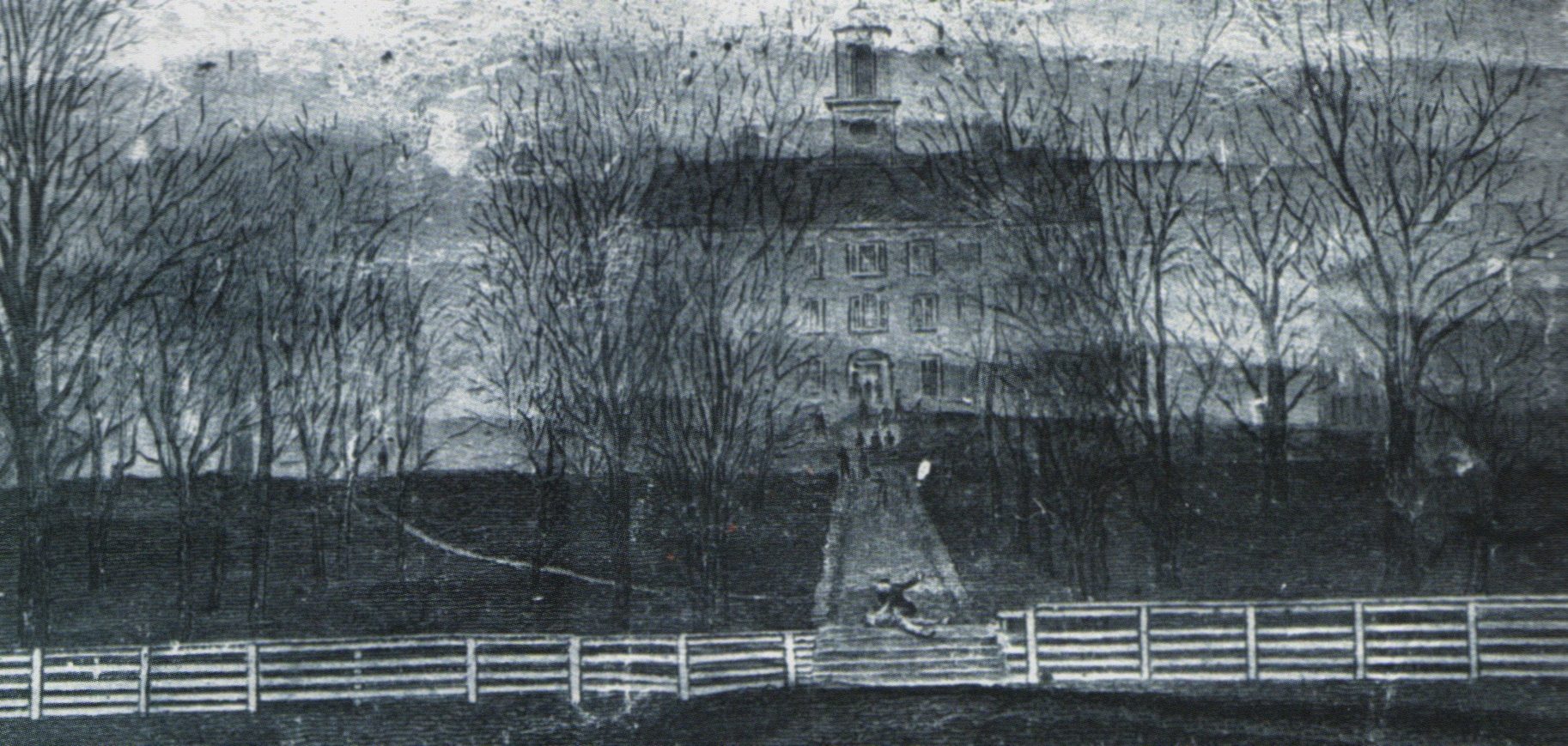
Manasseh Cutler Hall, constructed by 1816 and opened in 1819, was the first academic building in the former Northwest Territory and was named after university founder Manasseh Cutler.

=== Background ===
Public support for higher education in America was not new when Manasseh Cutler first decided to organize an expedition bound for the Ohio Country. The university was first envisioned by Manasseh Cutler, credited as the school's founder along with Revolutionary War Brigadier General Rufus Putnam. Cutler had served as a chaplain in then-General Washington's Continental Army. On March 1, 1786, Cutler attended a meeting at the Bunch of Grapes Tavern with Putnam, Benjamin Tupper, and Samuel Holden Parsons to form the Ohio Company of Associates. The following year, Cutler organized a contract with Congress whereby his associates (former soldiers of the Revolutionary War) might purchase one and a half million acres (6,000 km^{2}) of land at the mouth of the Muskingum River with their Certificate of Indebtedness, which led to a contract being drawn up, later approved by the Confederation Congress. Provisions of the contract included setting aside two townships in the center of the purchase for a university; these "College Lands" are in Appalachia. The Confederation Congress, which operated under the Articles of Confederation, did not work with an executor or cabinet. Executive roles transacted from committees of Congress or appointed persons.

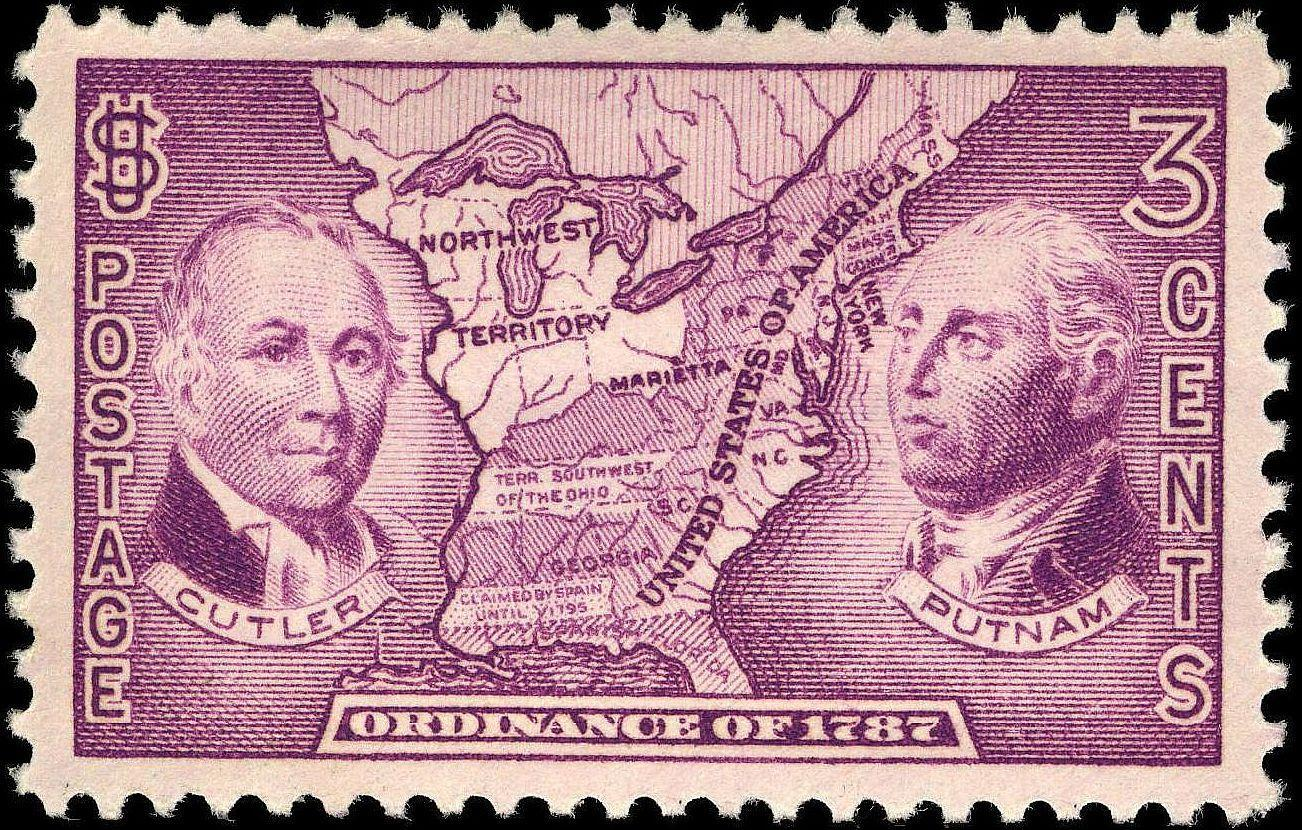
1937 commemorative stamp of Cutler, Putnam, and the Northwest Ordinance

Considered one of the most important legislative acts of the Confederation Congress, the Northwest Ordinance of 1787 established a precedent under which the federal government would be sovereign and expand westward with the admission of new states, instead of the expansion of existing states and their established sovereignty under the Articles of Confederation. The influence of Thomas Jefferson was felt in the way the ordinance territory would be gridded into townships to provide an orderly settlement process and government revenue. The 1787 ordinance encouraged public schools, stipulating that "Religion, morality and knowledge being necessary to good government and the happiness of mankind, schools and the means of education shall forever be encouraged" (this phrase is engraved on the university's gateway); furthering the former 1785 ordinance which had instructed each township to designate land that would be provided to public education.

=== Establishment ===
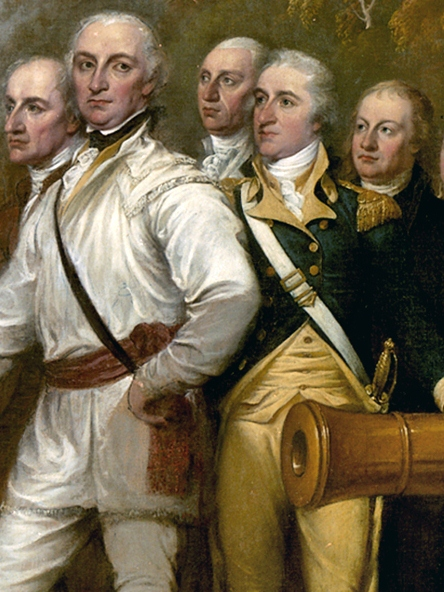
General Rufus Putnam, middle-rear, was a university trustee from 1804 to 1824

By the spring of 1788, Rufus Putnam had gathered fifty laborers, surveyors, and boat builders and proceeded to the Muskingum River, and he surveyed and laid out a town to provide a home for the future university. In 1797, settlers from Marietta traveled downstream on the Ohio River and up the Hocking River to establish a location for the school, founding Athens due to its location directly between the original capital of Chillicothe and Marietta. "On January 8, 1802, the legislature of the Northwest Territory and Governor Arthur St. Clair approved the charter of the American Western University. This institution of higher education was never opened." In addition to being instrumental in its founding, Putnam was also an original trustee of the university, and Putnam Hall is named after him.

At the time of the establishment of its first university, "Ohio was occupied by numerous American Indian tribes:" the land on which Ohio University stands is the traditional territory of the Haudenosauneega Confederacy and the Osage Nation, which was consigned to the United States by the Western Confederacy in 1795 as part of the Treaty of Greenville. George Washington stated "the settlement of southeastern Ohio was not accidental, but the result of the careful deliberation of wise, prudent, and patriotic men."

A second charter was passed on February 18, 1804, by the Ohio General Assembly, establishing "Ohio University". This last approval happened eleven months after Ohio was admitted to the Union. On December 6, 1804, the first trustees, including Putnam, and Governor Tiffin gathered to raise operating funds by leasing university lands. In the spring of 1806, the trustees began to train pupils for the college's work. That year, a two-story building was completed by Jehiel Gregory on the College Green. The first three students of Ohio University enrolled in 1809 and Ohio University graduated two students with bachelor's degrees in 1815. Like many of the first American universities, Ohio University was planned to be outside major metropolitan areas to protect academe and studies from busy life, while later public universities would be usually planned in metropolitan areas.

=== Mid-to-late nineteenth century ===
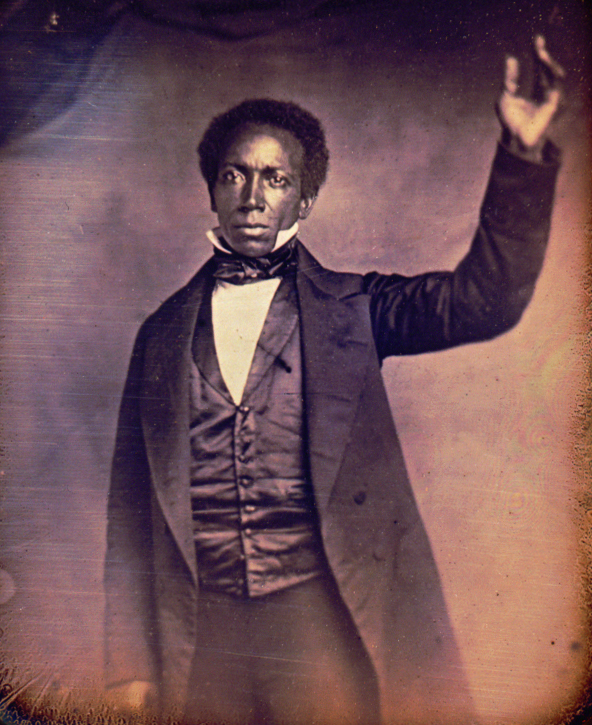
Edward James Roye attended Ohio University.

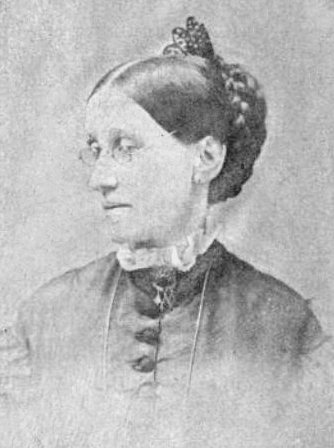
In 1838, age 10, Elizabeth O. Sampson Hoyt gained special admission to study in the philosophy class taught by President McGuffey; she became a philosopher in her own right and a widely celebrated writer.

John Newton Templeton became the first Black graduate of the university in 1828. An idea of the university's radical history was gathered in the commencement of 1828, featuring elements as groundbreaking as the speaker role of Templeton and an address on Female Education—decades before the suffrage movement and Civil War began. The university's journey as an academic center would not see its maturity until after the 1830s, as it struggled to garner significant funds from the state legislature, a body notoriously controlled by farmers who despised liberal arts. The first publication, The Echo and University Record, began and was discontinued in 1843. Ohio University was closed between 1843 and 1848. Beta Theta Pi became the first fraternity. Many people from Athens were active in the Civil War activities on behalf of the Union. The university served as station of interest for activity between Ohio and what would become West Virginia. The Morrill Land Grant College Act's passage saw Ohio and Miami universities attempt to persuade the state to divide the designated 630,000 acres (250,000 ha) of land, but delays curtailed the effort and, ultimately, Ohio University was neglected by the Stalwarts who did not assign any land or money from the act to it. In 1874, the Ohio General Assembly instead strongly supported the new Ohio State University created by the Morrill Act in Columbus and proposed that both Ohio and Miami be demoted to preparatory schools. In 1880, it was suggested that Ohio and Miami be merged directly with Ohio State, but the 1896 Sleeper Bill introduced by Athenian David L. Sleeper, the Speaker of the Ohio House of Representatives, provided annual support for the university from the state, allowing for Ohio University's survival and elevation to being a state university and setting the precedent for continuing state support. Thus, Ohio University was one of the earliest institutions of higher education in the state to be invested with some state-level public support through taxes, starting in 1896. A second challenge to demote the university was defeated in 1906.

== Growth and female education ==
=== Changing admissions ===
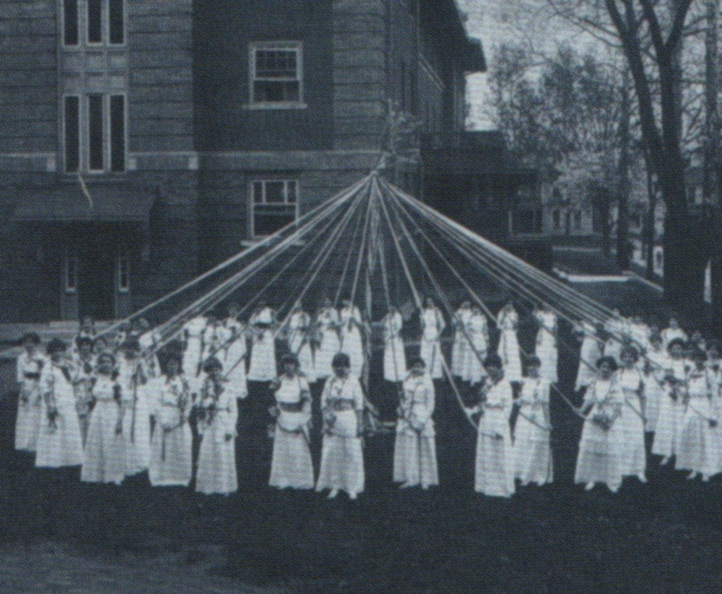
Women of Ohio in the early 1900s performing a Maypole dance as a rite of Spring on the College Green.

Women were admitted to university for the first time as undergraduates in 1868. Margaret "Maggie" Boyd graduated from Ohio University in 1873, having enrolled in the university's preparatory program in the spring of 1868. Recurrent melancholy and illness led to her diary entries that read "I feel so sad today" and "I feel so sick and so bad," although she added she could do as well as boys. On June 17 she informed President Scott she did not want a diploma with masculine endings, and the endings were changed. Scott remarked at the 1873 commencement ceremony that Boyd was the "oldest of a great sisterhood of graduates." Boyd has remained a popular historical figure on the Ohio University campus, with numerous functions named in her honor.

Only a few years after Boyd became the university's first woman graduate in 1873, there were fourteen female students on campus, including Minerva Woodson, who was probably the first female Black student to enroll at Ohio University. A decade after Boyd's graduation, the East Wing, now Wilson Hall, housed thirty women at $0.50 per week; the janitor's family; and the first female faculty member, Cynthia Weld, who was hired in 1883 to teach history and rhetoric. Also during this period, the first college choir was organized in 1894–95 and the first known international student, Saki Taro Murayama of Japan, graduated in 1895. Beginning in 1902, the new State Normal College (later the College of Education) drew many women who were planning to become teachers. To house them, the university acquired Howard Hall and in 1906 built Boyd Hall, named for Margaret Boyd.

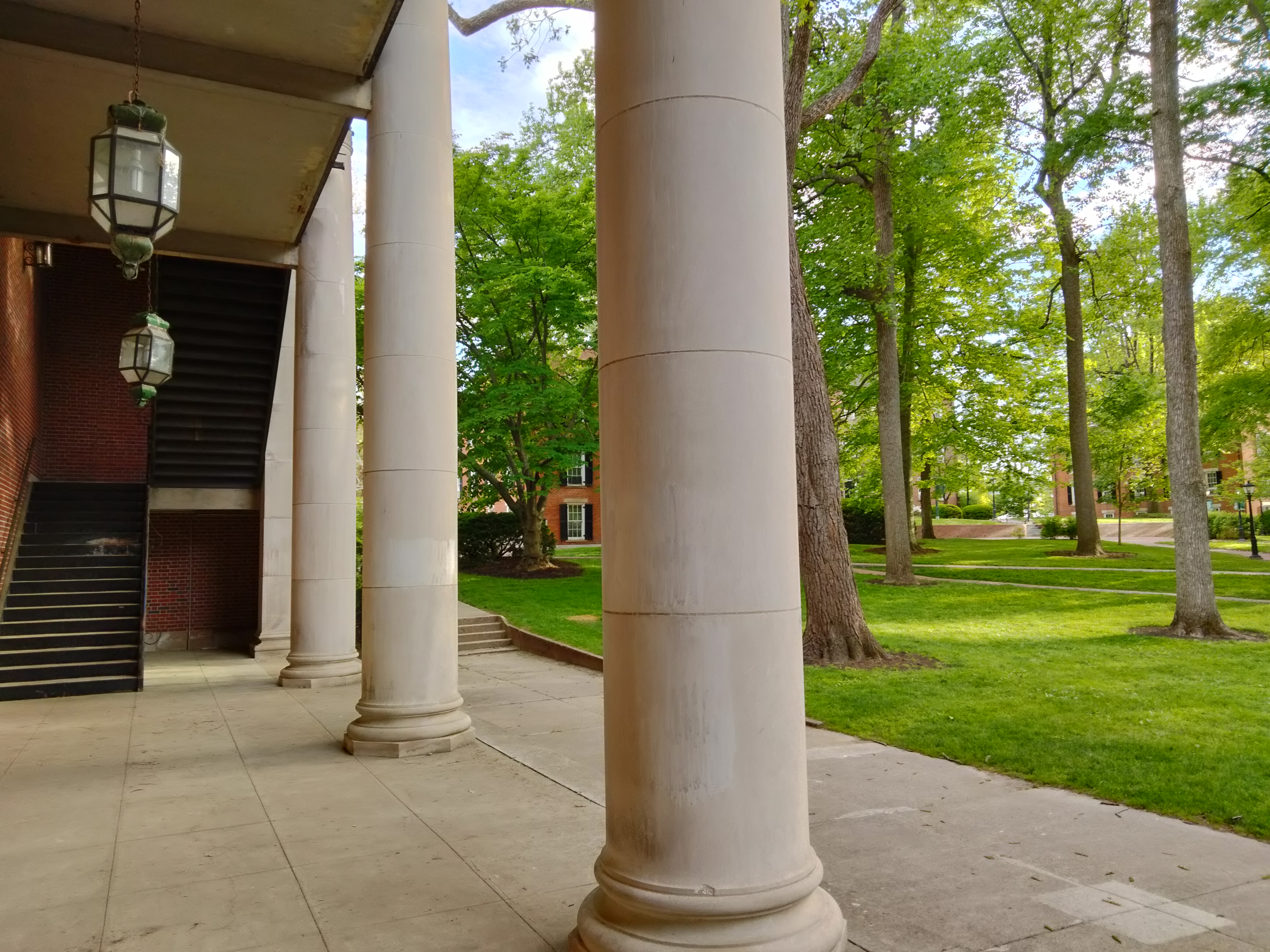
Templeton-Blackburn Alumni Memorial Auditorium was renamed for the first Black male and female graduates.

The first Black female graduate was Martha Jane Hunley in 1916, who graduated summa cum laude with a major in literature and English studies in 1916. Hunley had to find her own housing in Athens. In 1999, the university recognized her accomplishment by placing her name, along with John Newton Templeton's, on the Templeton-Blackburn Alumni Memorial Auditorium.

By 1913 there were around 330 women and 500 men in the student body, and organized chapters of four national sororities—Pi Beta Phi (1889), Alpha Gamma Delta (1908), Alpha Xi Delta (1911), and Chi Omega (1913)—as well as several departmental clubs, including the Home Economics Club and Kindergarten Club; and the Young Women's Christian Association, which sponsored activities ranging from volunteering in the community to team sports. That year, the university hired its first Dean for Women, Irma Voigt. She later wrote that, aside from getting a desk in the hallway of Cutler Hall, she received little instruction, much less comradery, from President Alston Ellis. Within three weeks, she called a meeting of all women students and faculty to discuss establishing a Women's League, which would develop "spirit, loyalty, and standards".

=== Early twentieth century ===
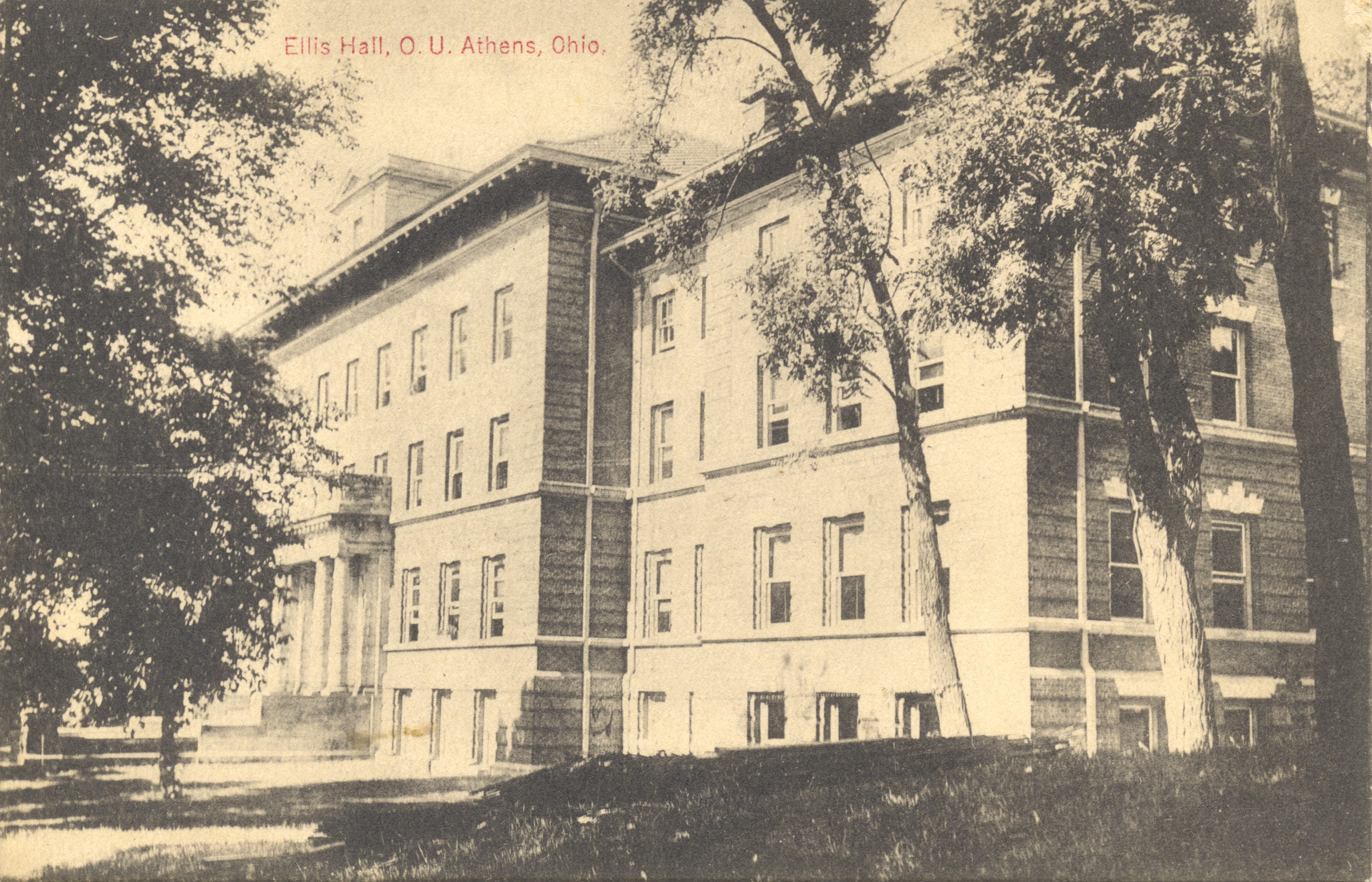
Ellis Hall was built in the early 20th century entirely with state funding.

The university had offered a liberal arts curriculum through the 1800s, but the liberal arts were not fully organized until the formation of the main undergraduate college—the College of Liberal Arts—in 1902. The bobcat was selected as the official university mascot in 1925.

Voigt served as Dean for Women for 36 years, during which time she helped pioneer activities for women with her involvement in the university branch of the YWCA, the Women's Recreation Association, Student Council, and the Panhellenic Council and as the first president of the Athens branch of the American Association of University Women. In 1920, when the Nineteenth Amendment gave women the right to vote, Voigt, a suffragist, arranged political forums for women, believing that some men were "sitting back and waiting for us to make a mess out of our enfranchisement." Voigt liberalized women's rules, refereed women's basketball games, and took hiking trips with "her girls".

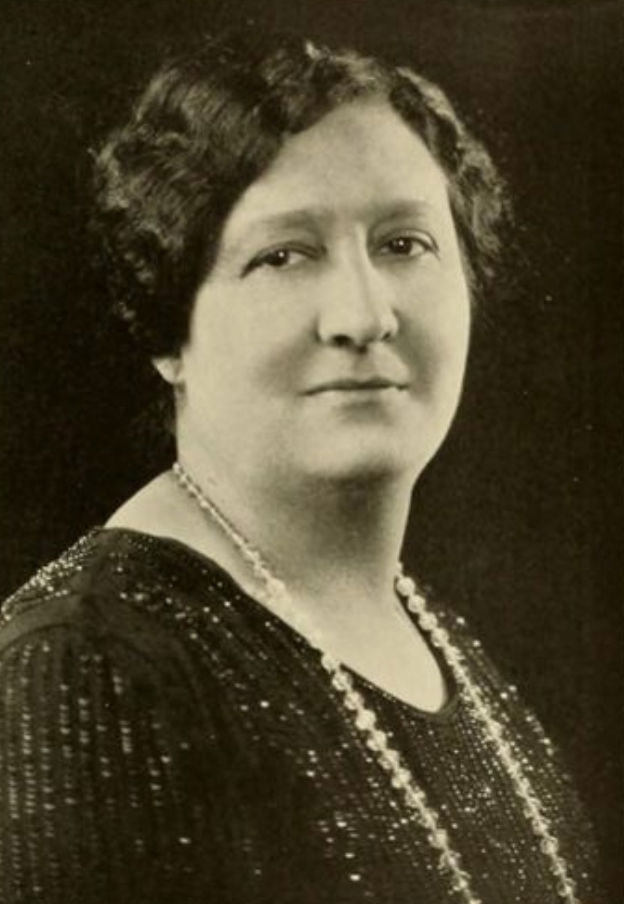
Dean Irma Voigt

Ohio University restructured its two colleges into five in 1935, establishing the colleges of commerce, fine arts, and applied science in addition to the existing colleges of arts and sciences and education. The graduate college was created in 1936, and the first PhD program was initiated in 1956 in chemistry. Dean Irma Voigt retired in 1949. Three years after her funeral in 1953, Voigt Hall was named in her honor.

Leona Wise Felsted and Janice Battin Bixler each served as dean of women for brief periods in the early 1950s. In 1953 Margaret Deppen, an early feminist, was appointed. When the positions of dean of women and dean of men were dissolved in 1962, Deppen took the new title Director of Organizations and Activities, retiring in 1975.

== War and activism ==
=== Increased enrollment ===
The 20th century saw dramatic growth in student enrollment, academic offerings, and research facilities. The World War I and World War II years had seen incredible work of Ohio students and faculty to the Allied war effort, and many service people returned home to embark on college studies. After World War II, the university also began to establish regional campuses throughout southeast Ohio to help reduce overcrowding on the university's main campus. The first, Ohio University – Chillicothe, was opened in 1946 with 281 students, 70 percent of which were armed services veterans. Later campuses would come in 1946 at Zanesville, 1956 in Ironton and Lancaster, 1957 in St. Clairsville, and 2006 in Proctorville.

Between 1955 and 1970, undergraduate enrollment tripled from 7,000 to 20,000. During this era, the campus grew, with the construction of 25 new dormitories located on two new residential college greens, with radio and television stations, research and classroom facilities, and the construction of the 13,000-seat Convocation Center arena.

=== 1960s ===
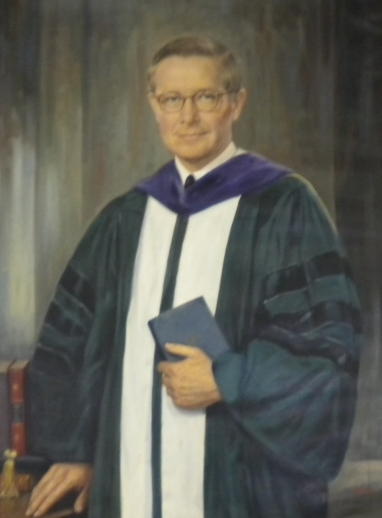
15th President Vernon R. Alden played a pivotal part throughout the 1960s.

The first suited mascot, Mr Bobcat, was introduced at the 1960 homecoming. The Athens campus of the 1960s saw recognition of the consequences of hegemony, a simultaneous commitment to the ideals of the Declaration of Independence and the United States Constitution, and developments for gender equality, environmentalism, and equal education for African Americans. In 1963, the university's first Black faculty member was hired by the English department. The next year brought James Barnes to Political Science and Ronald Williams to Hearing and Speech. Representatives from Black organizations met with President Alden to propose separate dormitories for African American students, the hiring of more Black faculty, the inclusion of more Africana works in the library, and more attention to programming for Black students.

In 1964, U.S. President Lyndon B. Johnson publicly referenced his Great Society initiative for the first time on the College Green, giving the university exposure across America and internationally. The 1960s ushered numerous changes for women at the university as well. In spring of 1967, the band director eliminated women from the famous Marching 110 marching band to build "greater esprit de corps," and for seven years after, the band remained open only to male members. When the American Federation of State, County, and Municipal employees, AFSCME, went on strike the same year, they demanded "equal classification of jobs" and more sensible requirements for cafeteria workers (who were all women).

The main library was opened in May 1969 and dedicated as the Vernon Roger Alden Library. A student protest was held outside the library against the curfew on women students, giving it the alternative dedication of the Freedom Library. Some students also held a hunger strike against the curfew. Also in 1969, the Center for Afro-American Studies was founded, establishing African American Studies at the university.

=== 1970s ===
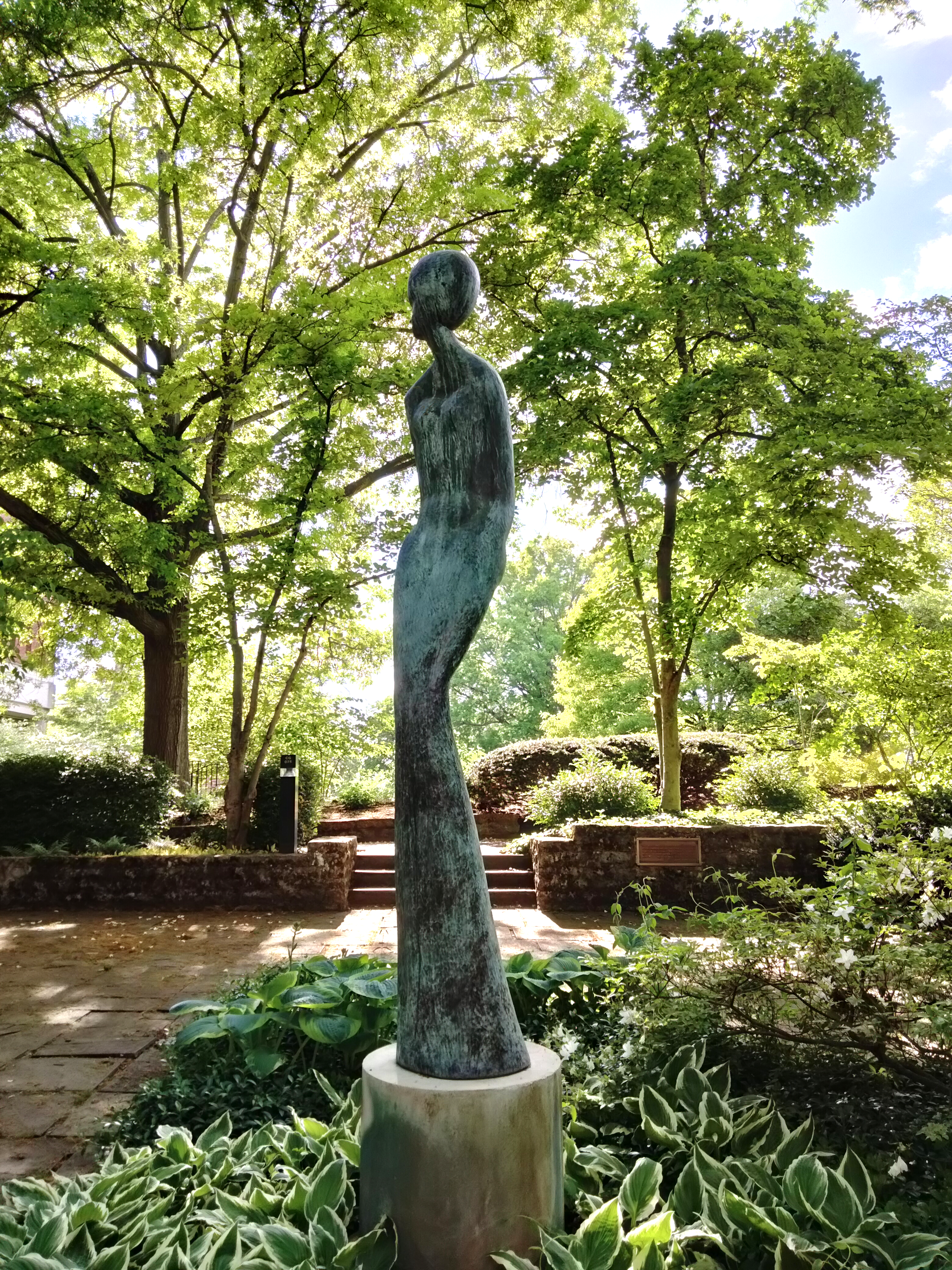
American Woman, on College Green

The 1970s were a decade of further change. The Vietnam War was extremely unpopular to Ohio University students and Athens residents alike, and in its wake, saw the emergence of some of America's foremost examples of student protest and civil unrest during the era. On May 4, 1970, the Ohio National Guard was ordered to open fire on students demonstrating against the war at Kent State University, killing 4 and wounding 9. At the same time, there were sit-ins and anti-war riots at Ohio University, even more intense than those of Kent State. This was partly due to the administration's refusal to close the university; instead of going home, many students from other Ohio universities that did close came to Athens to protest further. When the Ohio National Guard was called in to Athens, there was a 3-hour battle at the Baker Center, resulting in 23 injured and 54 arrested students. On May 15, the campus was closed. The university ceased women's hours in 1972. President Claude Sowle appointed 1969 alumna Beverly Price as special assistant for women's affairs. Reverend Jan Griesinger, the first female minister in Athens, directed United Campus Ministry which established the Athens Women Against Rape in 1974 and the Athens chapter of the National Organization for Women (NOW) in 1975. In 1974, a group of female part-time faculty led a survey that concluded low-wage jobs, inadequate benefits, and sub-standard housing were actively offered through university contracts. Subsequently, the faculty senate proposed several improvements. In 1975, Ohio established its medical school, known as the Heritage College of Osteopathic Medicine. Heritage is the only medical school in the state to award the Doctor of Osteopathic Medicine degree. Patricia Richard, Joy Huntley, and Barbara Daniel organized the first women's studies program at the university in 1978. In 1979, the program established a certificate program with a $10,000 budget. In 1978, six women in the music school filed a complaint with the Equal Employment Opportunity Commission that resulted in an investigation of the inequities between men's and women's pay, and the adjustment of $30,000 in equitable wages. After the incident, the Provost's office initiated regular "salary equity studies." That same year, the Athens Women's Collective grew out of talks within United Campus Ministries, and raised issues pertaining to violence that produced the Student Escort Service. In 1979, the collective organized the first Take Back the Night March, and saw hundreds of women and men rally against staying home as being a solution to unsafe street violence and rape. That same year, on the university's 175th anniversary, Chubu University of Japan donated 175 cherry trees.

== University to the world ==
=== 1980s and 1990s ===
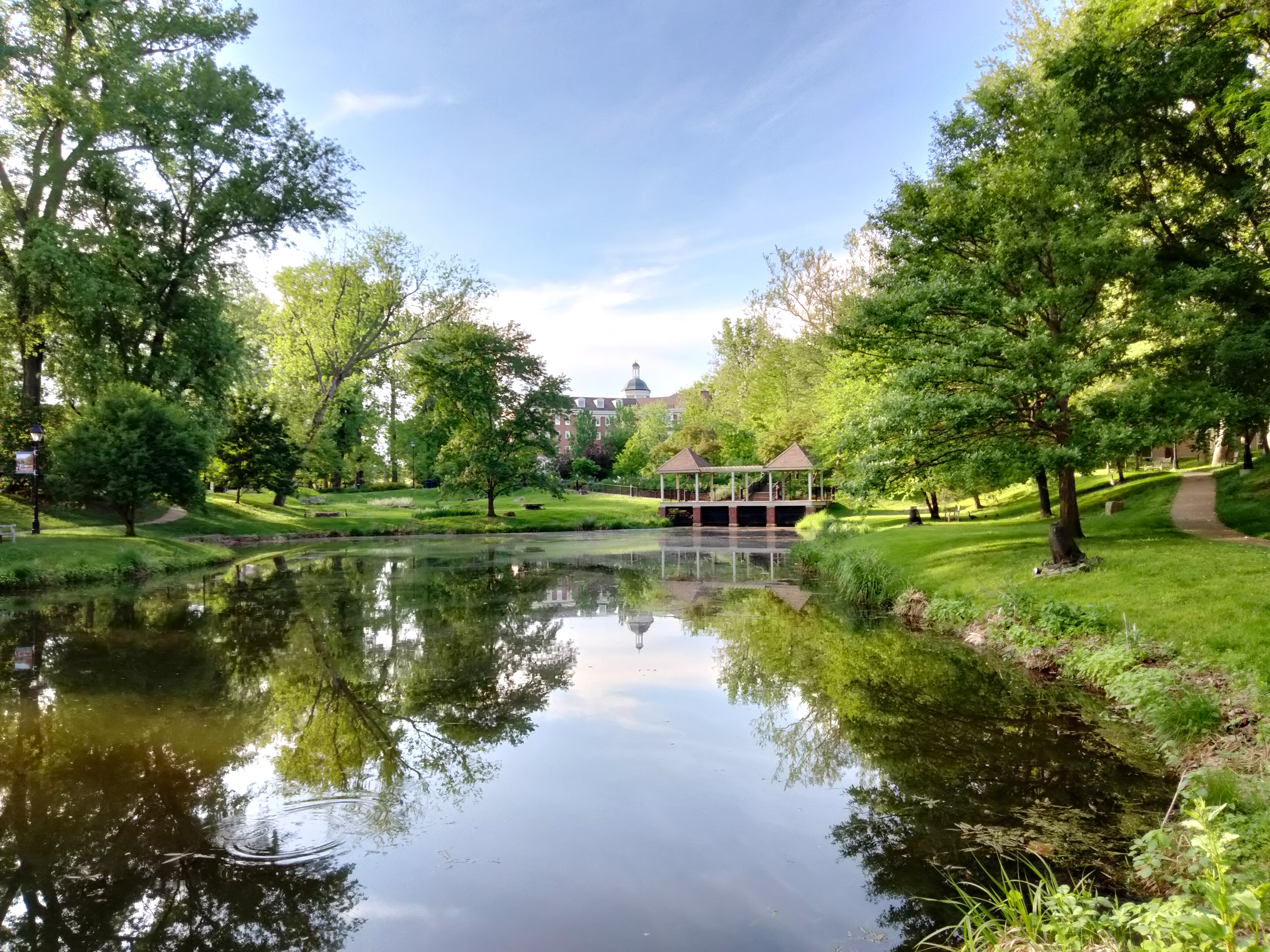
Emeriti Park was dedicated in 2004.

Since the 1980s, many new programs, faculty, undergraduates, and postgraduates contributed to the expanded global imprint of Ohio. Defining trends of this period include process standardization, digital advents, and largescale research that would give rise to Ohio becoming a distinctive national university, and not only an undergraduate-focused or regional entity similar to newer universities in state. By 1980, eighteen women's studies courses were being offered by twelve departments. Also in the early 1980s, the university faced allegations that it discriminated on the basis of sex in its intercollegiate athletic program, and also saw the first time women outnumbered men 7,735 to 6,474; however, faculty and graduate assistant numbers were reversed. The Ohio University Innovation Center, a technology business incubator, started in 1983. The Ohio University Edison Biotechnology Institute was founded in 1984. A graduate Women's Studies program was approved in 1985. The number of tenure-tracked female faculty spiked from 150 in 1992 to 240 that year; 265 women played on university-sponsored intercollegiate athletic teams. In 1993, Barbara Ross-Lee, D.O., was appointed Dean of the Heritage College of Osteopathic Medicine, becoming the first female African American to serve as dean of a medical school in America. Queer visibility increased on the Athens campus in the 1990s. In the Glidden administration, from 1994 to 2004, new construction included the Life Sciences Research Facility, Emeriti Park, Walter Hall, plus major renovations to Gordy Hall, Grover Center, and Memorial Auditorium; the expansion of Bentley Hall and Copeland Hall; and groundwork for the new Baker Center that opened in 2007. At the seventy-fifth anniversary of women's suffrage in 1995, the university placed a plaque on Memorial Auditorium commemorating Susan B. Anthony's visit to Athens. In 1999, the university hired Susan Burgess as the first full-time tenured director of the women's studies program.

=== 2000s, 2010s, and 2020s ===
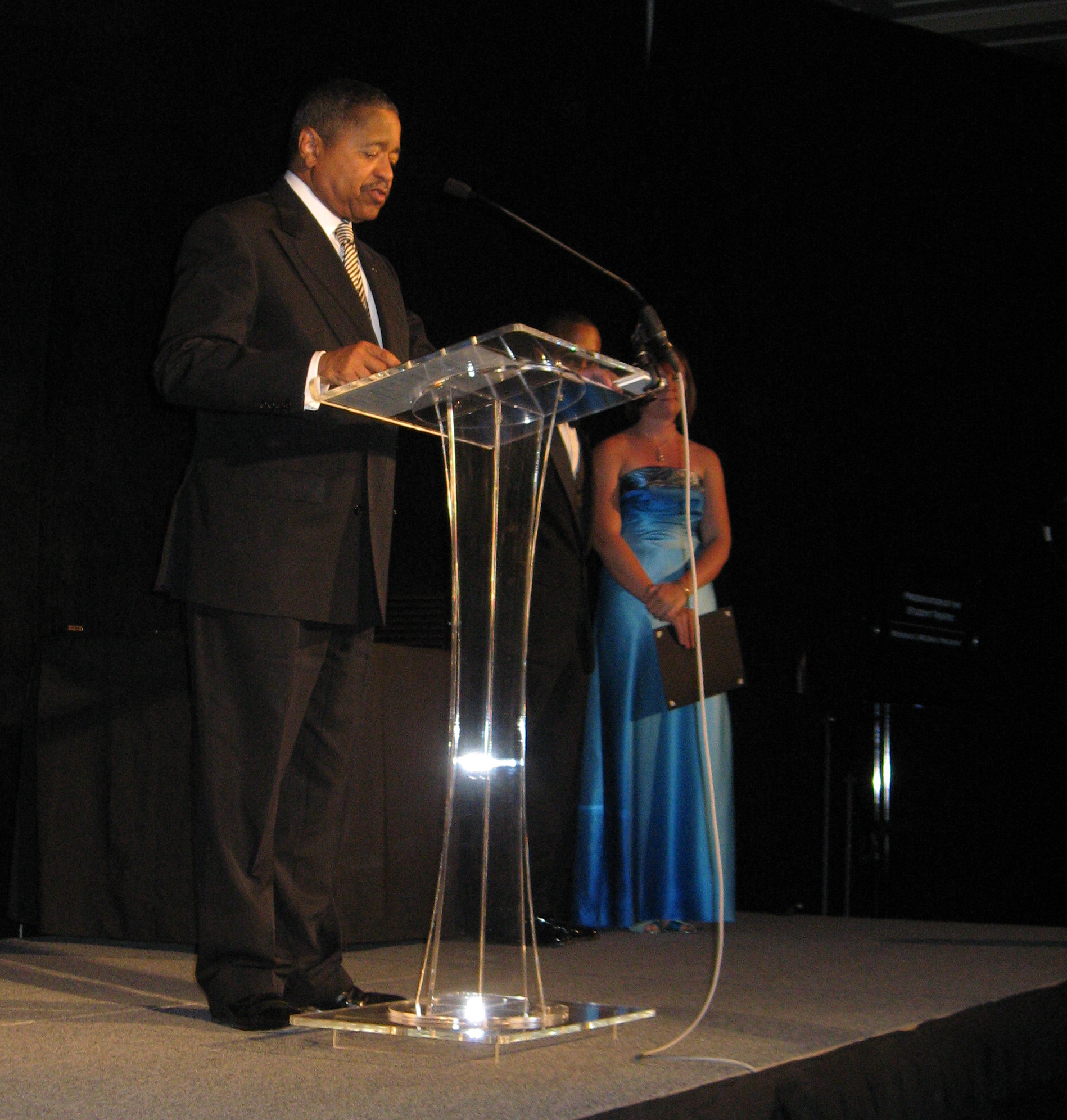
20th President Roderick J. McDavis served his alma mater 13 years.

The 2000s, 2010s, and 2020s have rapidly spurred the impact of Ohio University. The university launched the Global Leadership Center to engage students from any major in a wide variety of global impact projects during their studies. By the bicentennial year 2004, Distinguished Teaching Professors recognized by the university included Alan R. Booth (PhD Boston University, Professor of Humanities and History since 1964 – History of Southern Africa), Lois Davis Vines (PhD Georgetown University, Professor of Humanities and French since 1969 – Poe abroad), Thomas H. Carpenter (PhD Oxford University, Professor of Humanities and Classics since 1996 – Art and myth in Ancient Greece), and Dean McWilliams (PhD University of Oregon, Professor of Humanities and English since 1969 – Butor and Gardner). Roderick McDavis was elected Ohio University's first Black president, serving 13 years.

The bobcat mascot was named Rufus by a winning vote in 2006. Ohio University maintains a Women's Center dedicated for use of university women at the Baker University Center: The center features studying space, health-related stations, and female-integrated programming to foster the five university pillars of the honor code. Additionally, the student body recognizes a Women's Affairs Commission as one of several commissions on Student Senate. In 2009, Venki Ramakrishnan shared the Nobel Prize in Chemistry with Thomas A. Steitz and Ada Yonath, "for studies of the structure and function of the ribosome."

Ohio University became a space-grant institution in the 2010s. In Fall of 2012, Ohio University converted its academic calendar from quarters to semesters, after first having changed to quarters in 1967. Through the contemporary period, the College Green has hosted numerous speeches from prominent voices. (Note: Under the direction of Richard Suk, the Marching 110 Band opened for Hillary Clinton's speech at Baker Center in October 1996. Clinton spoke on the steps of the old Baker Center, which was located on College Green during her visit.) Philanthropists have increased total contributions to the university in its present period more so than ever before. The university has carried out strategic research, undertaken difficult retrenchment, created impactful quality upgrades, and strengthened students for their future. In January 2022, Ohio University achieved its first national designation as R1: Doctoral Universities – Very high research activity. In April 2022, Larry Connor became the first person to reach inner Earth and outer space within one year. (Note: His mission made Connor only the third person ever to reach oceanic depths and space.) In March 2023, Lori Stewart Gonzalez, Interim President at the University of Louisville, was unanimously elected by the board of trustees to become the 23rd and first woman President in the 219-year history of Ohio University. As of 2022, Ohio University comprises nine campuses, nine undergraduate colleges, its Graduate College, its college of medicine, and its public affairs school, and offers more than 250 areas of undergraduate study as well as certificates, master's and doctoral degrees. Ohio University ranks among the top 30 largest residential college campuses in the United States.

== Presidents ==
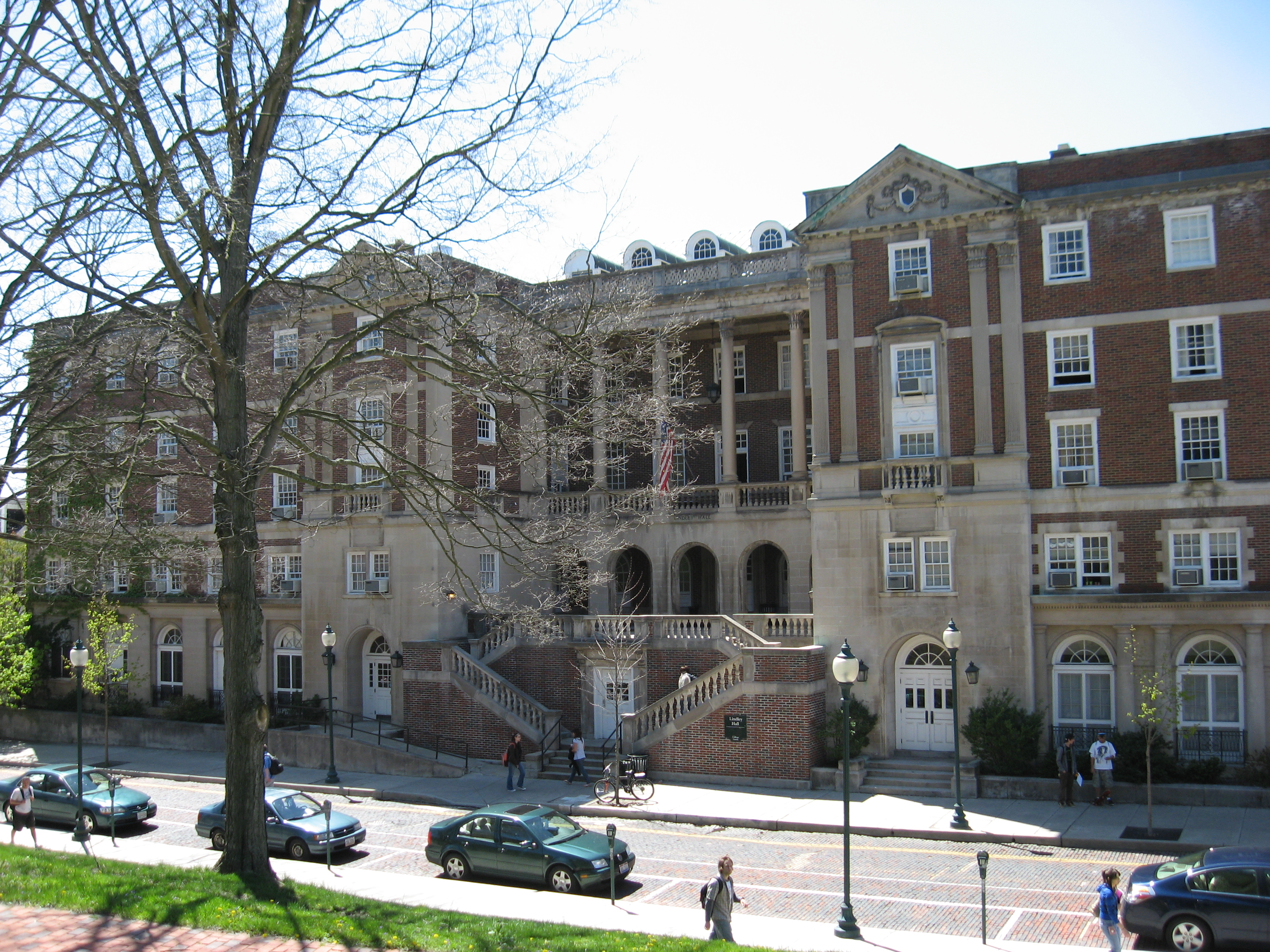
Lindley Hall at Ohio University, named for first President Jacob Lindley

The Ohio University has known twenty-three leaders serve as its President. A conflict arose during the presidency of William Holmes McGuffey, who was also a Presbyterian minister, and Ohio University was closed between 1843 and 1848, due to poor financial conditions partly caused by a power struggle between faculty and Methodist ministers. There was a proposal in the Ohio Legislature to move Ohio University to Mansfield, Ohio, due to Athens' hostility to the institution; however, the scheme was defeated. Alfred Ryors, another Presbyterian, succeeded McGuffey. "With [Solomon] Howard's election [to be university president after Ryors,] domination of University affairs passed from the Presbyterians to the Methodists." Except for Super, Crook, McDavis, Nellis, Sherman, and Stewart Gonzalez, all presidents of the university have buildings named after them, most notably Ping Recreation Center and Baker University Center; the remaining buildings are residence halls and operations buildings.

Order	Name	Years	Occupation
1	Jacob Lindley	1809–1822	Presbyterian minister
2	James Irvine	1822–1824	Presbyterian minister and mathematician
3	Robert G. Wilson	1824–1839	Presbyterian minister
4	William Holmes McGuffey	1839–1843	Philosopher and educator
5	Alfred Ryors	1848–1852	Mathematician
6	Solomon Howard	1852–1872	Methodist minister
7	William Henry Scott	1872–1883	Methodist minister and philosopher
8	Charles William Super	1884–1896; 1899–1901	Greek professor
9	Isaac Crook	1896–1898	Methodist minister and educator
10	Alston Ellis	1901–1920*	Public educator
11	Elmer Burritt Bryan	1921–1934*	Public educator
12	Herman Gerlach James	1935–1943	Lawyer
13	Walter S. Gamertsfelder	1943–1945	Philosopher
14	John Calhoun Baker	1945–1961	Business professor
15	Vernon Alden	1962–1969	Business professor
16	Claude R. Sowle	1969–1974	Lawyer
17	Harry B.Crewson	1974–1975	Economist
18	Charles J. Ping	1975–1994	Presbyterian divine and philosopher
19	Robert Glidden	1994–2004	Music professor
20	Roderick J. McDavis	2004–2017	Higher education professor
21	M. Duane Nellis	2017–2021	Geographer
22	Hugh Sherman	2021–2023	Business professor
23	Lori Stewart Gonzalez	2023–present	Language pathologist

* Edwin Watts Chubb was acting president for one year in 1920 when President Ellis died and again in 1934 when President Bryan died.

== See also ==
- History of Ohio
- List of Ohio University alumni
- List of Ohio University faculty
- List of presidents of Ohio University
