= List of presidents of Ohio University =

President of Ohio University
- Incumbent; Lori Stewart Gonzalez since 2023
- Appointer: Ohio University Board of Governors
- Formation: 1804
- First holder: Jacob Lindley (1809 - 1822)
- Website: Office of the President

This list of presidents of Ohio University includes all who have served as president of Ohio University. The university has known twenty-three leaders serve; and except for Super, Crook, McDavis, Nellis, Sherman, and Stewart Gonzalez, all presidents of the university have buildings named after them, most notably Alden Library, Baker University Center, and Ping Recreation Center; the remaining buildings are residence halls and operations buildings.

== Presidents ==
Order	Portrait	Name	Years	Occupation	Namesake
1		Jacob Lindley	1809–1822	Presbyterian minister	Lindley Hall
2		James Irvine	1822–1824	Presbyterian minister and mathematician	Irvine Hall
3		Robert G. Wilson	1824–1839	Presbyterian minister	Wilson Hall
4		William Holmes McGuffey	1839–1843	Philosopher and educator	McGuffey Hall
5		Alfred Ryors	1848–1852	Mathematician	Ryors Hall
6		Solomon Howard	1852–1872	Methodist minister	Howard Park (aka North Green; formerly Howard Hall)
7		William Henry Scott	1872–1883	Methodist minister and philosopher	Scott Quad (demolished)
8		Charles William Super	1884–1896; 1899–1901	Greek professor	
9		Isaac Crook	1896–1898	Methodist minister and educator	
10		Alston Ellis	1901–1920*	Public educator	Ellis Hall
11		Elmer Burritt Bryan	1921–1934*	Public educator	Bryan Hall
12		Herman Gerlach James	1935–1943	Lawyer	James Hall
13		Walter S. Gamertsfelder	1943–1945	Philosopher	Gamertsfelder Hall
14		John Calhoun Baker	1945–1961	Business professor	Baker University Center
15		Vernon Alden	1962–1969	Business professor	Alden Library
16		Claude R. Sowle	1969–1974	Lawyer	Sowle Hall
17		Harry B.Crewson	1974–1975	Economist	Crewson House
18		Charles J. Ping	1975–1994	Presbyterian divine and philosopher	Ping Recreation Center
19		Robert Glidden	1994–2004	Music professor	Glidden Hall
20		Roderick J. McDavis	2004–2017	Higher education professor	McDavis Hall (forthcoming)
21		M. Duane Nellis	2017–2021	Geographer	
22		Hugh Sherman	2021–2023	Business professor	
23		Lori Stewart Gonzalez	2023–present	Language pathologist	

* Edwin Watts Chubb was acting president for one year in 1920 when President Ellis died and again in 1934 when President Bryan died. Chubb Hall is named for him.
