= William Mitchel Daily =

American academic, preacher and theologian

3rd President of Indiana University
- In office 1853–1859
- Preceded by: Alfred Ryors
- Succeeded by: John Hiram Lathrop

35th United States House of Representatives Chaplain
- In office 1844–1845
- Preceded by: Isaac S. Tinsley
- Succeeded by: William Henry Milburn

Personal details
- Born: 1812 Coshocton, Ohio, US
- Died: February 5, 1877 (aged 64–65) New Orleans, Louisiana
- Resting place: Madison, Indiana

Academic background
- Education: Indiana University

Academic work
- Discipline: Theology
- Institutions: St. Charles College; Indiana Asbury College; Indiana University

Ecclesiastical career
- Church: Methodist Episcopal Church
- Ordained: 1833

William Mitchel Daily (1812–February 5, 1877) was an American academic, preacher and theologian. He served as the third president of Indiana University from 1853-1859 and resigned under pressure after accusations of plagiarism, not paying debts, and incompetence. He served a one-year term as the chaplain of the US House of Representatives and also served as a hospital chaplain during the US Civil War. He was also the first president of the Indiana State Teachers Association.

== Early life and education ==
William Daily was born in 1812 in Coshocton, Ohio. Later that year his father moved to a farm in Franklin County and Daily spent his childhood there. He attended the country school, and later attended school in Brookville. At fifteen years of age, he took charge of a school in an adjoining county. Daily was baptized as a baby, grew up in the Methodist Episcopal Church, and was preaching by age 16. He joined the Conference in 1831, was ordained deacon in 1833, and elder in 1835. Daily was stationed in Bloomington, Indiana from 1835-1836 where he had duties as a local pastor and was a student at Indiana University. He graduated from the university in 1836.

== Early career ==
Daily was an agent of the Preacher's Aid Society in 1837, then was transferred to the Missouri Conference in 1838 and stationed in St. Louis. Shortly thereafter he became a professor at St. Charles College. Daily returned to Indiana in 1840 after a lung hemorrhage. In 1843 he took charge of a congregation in Madison, Indiana. While there he met Permelia A. Northcraft and they married. He was a chaplain in the United States Congress in the winter of 1844-1845, then stationed at Rising Sun and Evansville. During this time he was made agent for Indiana Asbury (now DePauw) University, then a presiding elder of the Bloomington and Madison districts. Daily was a member of the General Conference in 1852.

Daily attended and chaired the first session of the newly created Indiana State Teachers Association on December 25, 1854. He would go on to be elected the association's first President serving in that role until 1855.

== Tenure at Indiana University ==
William Daily was elected a trustee of Indiana University on February 10, 1853, and was seated on July 30, 1853. His resignation of the post was accepted by the Board of Trustees on August 2, 1853. He had served for one and a half days. His place was taken by Cyrus L. Dunham. The current Indiana University President at the time, Alfred Ryors, resigned on August 3, 1853, and William Daily was elected the third President of Indiana University that same day.

In July 1858, charges were brought against Daily by A. M. Murphy. He was accused of being incompetent, not paying debts, plagiarism, immorality, and not being a proper disciplinarian. On July 13, 1858, the eight members of the Board of Trustees met to consider the charges, but were unwilling to do so without proper evidence. Murphy then withdrew the charges, for reasons unknown, and the matter was not resolved. Daily attended the annual Indiana Methodist Conference that fall, but criticism of his behavior continued. He resigned under pressure on January 26, 1859. In the fall of 1859, the Indiana Methodist Conference examined the case of William Daily and decided to expel him. Daily had been the first Methodist to hold an important position at Indiana University.

== Late career ==
In 1862, Abraham Lincoln appointed Daily hospital chaplain at St. Louis, where he remained until the end of the war in 1865. Daily was associated with the Louisiana Conference in 1869, and was appointed in turn to the Baton Rouge district and the Upper Coast district, each for a four-year term. After that, he was appointed to the North New Orleans district but became seriously ill shortly after and died a few days later on February 5, 1877. A few months after his death, his remains were moved to Madison, Indiana.

== Education ==
- M.A. from Indiana University Bloomington.
- Honorary M.A. from Augusta College, Kentucky during the presidency of Bishop Bascom.
- Honorary Doctor of Divinity from Indiana University in 1851.
- LL.D. from University of Louisville.

Religious titles
Preceded by Isaac S. Tinsley	United States House of Representatives Chaplain; December 5, 1844 – December 1, 1845	Succeeded by William Henry Milburn
Academic offices
Preceded by Alfred Ryors	President of Indiana University; 1853–1859	Succeeded by John Hiram Lathrop
