= Indiana State Teachers Association =

The Indiana State Teachers Association (ISTA) is a statewide professional association and labor union which represents more than 45,000 public school teachers and education support professionals, staff in state higher education institutions, retired educators, and college students preparing to become teachers. It is affiliated with the National Education Association.

ISTA was founded on Christmas Day, 1854.

== History ==
The support of education in Indiana in the early 1800s had been sporadic and unorganized. By 1852, the need for legislation to finance public education was so apparent that the Indiana General Assembly passed laws providing for both state and local levies for school purposes. This important 1852 law was contested in the courts, however, and the Indiana Supreme Court ruled that it was unconstitutional because the tax was "discriminatory." This decision resulted that local taxes could not be used for public education, which threatened a serious setback to education in the state.

In response to the Court's decision several teachers associations met in Shelbyville and Salem. The associations issued a circular for the purpose of calling a convention of practical teachers with the view of organizing a permanent state teachers association. This circular was signed by the following:

- Caleb Mills
- M.M.C. Hobbs
- E.P. Cole
- Rufus Patch
- B.L. Lang
- T. Naylor
- O.J. Wilson
- J. Bright
- Geo. W. Hoss
- Cyrus Nutt
- Charles Barnes
- James G. May
- John Cooper
- B.T. Hoyt
- Lewis A. Estes
- J.S. Ferris
- R.B. Abbott
- George A. Chase
- Silas Baily

The first session of the newly created Indiana State Teachers Association was held in the Indiana State Capitol at 6:30 P.M. on Monday, December 25, 1854. William Mitchel Daily, then the newly elected President of Indiana University, was called to the chair and briefly stated the object of the meeting. The session was opened with prayer by Reverend T.H. Sinex of Bloomington. After which, Professor D. Read of Indiana University delivered an address upon the "Importance of Civil Polity as a Branch of the Common School Education". After the address, upon motion, the convention proceeded to organize the State Teachers Association.

A motion was made to appoint a committee to draft a constitution. However, Professor Caleb Mills arose and stated to the convention that at the request of a committee of teachers, he had prepared a constitution which was in the hands of the Secretary George A. Chase of Rushville. The motion was withdrawn and at the request of the convention the Secretary read the constitution, which was then adopted.

Officers elected at the first session were:

- President: Rev William Mitchel Daily, Bloomington
- Vice Presidents:
  - Rev Cyrus Nutt, Centerville
  - Rev J.S. Ferris, New Castle
  - Rev Chas Adams, Indianapolis
  - Prof D. Read, Bloomington
  - Prof JM Stone, Hanover College
  - Prof SH Thomson, Hanover College
  - Prof R Patch, Ontario
- Recording Secretary: George A. Chase, Rushville
- Corresponding Secretary: E.P. Cole, Indianapolis
- Treasurer: E.P. Cole, Indianapolis
- Executive Committee:
  - Prof Geo. W. Hoss, Chairman
  - Rev. Dr. Curry, Greencastle
  - Jas. G. May, New Albany
  - E.P. Cole, Indianapolis
  - Charles Barnes, Madison
  - R.B. Abbott, New Castle
  - Rev Bishop Ames, Indianapolis
