= Therese Albertine Luise Robinson =

American novelist

Therese Albertine Luise Robinson (Talvj)
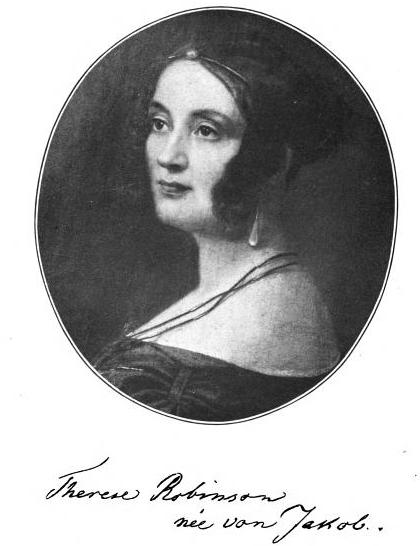
- Born: Therese Albertine Louise von Jakob (French: Thérèse Albertine Louise von Jacob, under Napoleonic occupation.); 26 January 1797; Halle, Germany
- Died: 13 April 1870 (aged 73); Hamburg, Germany
- Occupations: Translator; novelist; short story writer; essayist
- Writing career
- Pen name: Talvj
- Period: 1826–1870
- Genres: Translated poetry, Novella
- Notable works: Volkslieder der Serben (1826), Auswanderer (1852) tr. The Exile (1853)

Therese Albertine Luise von Jakob Robinson (26 January 1797 – 13 April 1870) was a German-American writer, linguist and translator, and second wife of biblical scholar Edward Robinson. She published under the pseudonym Talvj, an acronym derived from the initials of her birth name.

The author wrote a brief autobiographical preface in the Brockhausischen Conversations-Lexikon (1840). For a complete English biography, see Irma Elizabeth Voigt (1913).

== Biography ==
=== Russian years ===
She was born 1797 in Halle, to Ludwig Heinrich von Jakob, political writer and professor of philosophy. In 1806 or 1807, (Note: "When Therese was nine years old" according to Voigt 1913b, p. 29 and 1806 in Hale 1874; "As a ten-year-old" in Wallach 2003, p. 30) she accompanied her father's appointment to the University of Charkow, Russia (now Kharkiv, in Ukraine), where he served three (five?) years, during which she commenced the study of Slavic languages. (Note: "During her stay of three years in Charkow" Voigt 1913b, p. 29;"remained five years" in Hale 1874) She was deprived of formal education, though she had access to the university library at this time. In 1810 or 1811 (Note: "At the age of thirteen" Voigt 1913b, p. 30;"1811" in Hale 1874) her father was called to a position in St. Petersburg to aid in the revision of the criminal code, and during this time she was even further denied instructions, though she read voraciously ("unendlich viel"), especially books on history. (Note: Though according to Hale, her study shifted towards modern languages.) According to Voigt, none of the poetry she wrote in her St. Petersburg years were published during her lifetime, and most of it was probably destroyed, though poems such as "Sehnsucht" ('Nostalgia') from 1813 did appear in print. (Note: However, Hale 1874 states that her first poems were composed in the Charkow years, and later published under the pen name Talvi.) (Note: Her poetry Gedichte, signed Resede was published in 1820, Theodor Bell's Abendzeitung.Voigt 1913b, pp. 32, 146. Cf. also Voigt 1913b, pp. 39–40)

=== Repatriation to Germany ===
In 1816, the family moved back to Halle. Though she continued to write poetry and short stories, she was reluctant to publish them publicly in her own name. She translated Walter Scott's Old Mortality and The Black Dwarf, which she published under the pseudonym "Ernst Berthold" (Halle, 1822), but she purportedly did so for a little "pin-money" and "against her own inclination". In 1822, she submitted a series of literary criticisms, which were self-denigratingly signed "ein Frauenzimmer". (Note: In her 1822 criticism, she identified herself by the bylines "Briefe eines Frauenzimmers". Frauenzimmer is a term for women, now considered a pejoritive, but Goethe played on this, remarking she may call herself that but one of what extraordinary character and talent "ein Frauenzimmer von besondern Eigenschaften und Talenten Goethe (1824) "Serbische Lieder", "Auswärtige Literatur und Volkspoesie," quoted in Voigt 1911 (thesis) page 7? (indirectly via Aufsätze zur Literatur) Cf. also Talvj referring to herself as "ungelehrtes Frauenzimmer" in Voigt 1913b, p. 45.)

Talvj was the pen name she invented, an acrostic formed from the initials of her maiden name (Therese Albertine Louise von Jacob) which she would use to sign her works thereafter, beginning with Psyche (1825), a collection of three short stories.

=== Serbian language and Goethe ===
Her interest in the Serbian language was triggered by reading Jakob Grimm's criticism of the Serbian folk songs, and she delved into its study to obliterate her sorrow following the loss of a sister in 1823. With her background in the Russian language, she soon mastered the language, initiating work on translating Serbian folk songs. Learning Goethe had struck up interest in such Serbian songs, she "despite an almost overpowering timidity" ventured to write to him about her project, accompanied by sample drafts of songs she completed. After receiving from Goethe much encouragement through correspondence and meetings in person, her translation Volkslieder der Serben ('Folk songs of the Serbs') appeared in 1826. Goethe glowingly recommended her creation in Kunst und Altertum, and favorably compared her efforts, which were in popularly accessible language, against Grimm's strict literal translations. And the work became the lasting hallmark of her reputation for posterity.

=== Marriage and coming to America ===
In August 1828, she married the American theologian Edward Robinson. She had suffered the losses of both her mother and her father in and around this time, and it was an agonizing step for her to leave Germany. The couple remained in Europe another two years, sojourning in several countries.

In 1830 they reached the United States, settling in Andover, Massachusetts where awaited his professorship at the Andover Seminary. There will be no published literary output from her for some four years. But shortly upon arrival in America, she began the study of the languages of Native American Indians, which later culminated in a translated handbook. She worked in her personal capacity as a bridge between German and American culture, and assisted her husband's work in introducing German theology and thought through the press Biblical Repository, which her husband established 1831.

They moved to Boston in 1833, and she found herself in the intellectual circles around Karl Follen. The following year, she resumed her literary activity in her own right, first (Note: Although Der Lauf der Welt (1834) appears ahead in the publication list, Voigt 1913b, p. 146) translating into German John Pickering's "Indian Languages of North America" printed in Encyclopedia Americana (1830–1831), which appeared as Über die Indianischen Sprachen Amerikas (1834). Pickering's work proposed a standard orthography for phonetically transcribing Native American words to remedy the fact that scholars from different nationalities adopted inconsistent romanization schemes. This system was based on the German pronunciation model. The same year, she wrote Historical View of the Slavic Languages published by her husband's Biblical Repository (Andover, 1834), It was later reissued in expanded book form as Historical View of the Languages and Literature of the Slavic Nations, with a Sketch of their Popular Poetry (New York and London, 1850). (Note: Historical View of the Slavic Languages was translated into German, according to Hale. Presumably Übersichtliches Handbuch einer Geschichte der slavischen Sprachen und Literatur (1852).)

In 1836, she anonymously submitted "Popular Poetry of the Teutonic Nations," to the North American Review (Robinson 1836, NAR 91, 295-). The piece included a number of translated poems from Scandinavian languages, later included in Henry Wadsworth Longfellow ed., The Poets and Poetry of Europe (1847). Her article was later published as a book in German, entitled Charakteristik der Volkslieder germanischen Nationen mit einer Uebersicht der Lieder aussereuropäischer Völkerschaften ('[Attempt at an Historical] Characterization of the Popular Songs of the German Nations, with a Review of the Songs of the Extra-European Races') (1840). (Note: English titled used in Hale.)

=== Germany 1837-1840 ===
1837, she left her Bostonian circle of friends, and made her home in New York, where her husband obtained position at the seminary. However they were immediately bound for Europe on Edward's investigatory assignment, and during 1837–1840 she would reside in her native Germany, while Edward was engaged in his mission in Palestine.

During this period came her book asserting proof that Ossianic poems were forgeries by the discoverer James Macpherson; it appeared under the title Die Unächtheit der Lieder Ossian's und des Macphersonschen Ossian's insbesondere or 'The spuriousness of Ossian's songs' (Leipzig, 1840).

=== New York 1840-1863 ===
The literati who frequented their New York home were George Bancroft, William Cullen Bryant, Bayard Taylor, and Frederick Law Olmsted. She also struck up friendship with Washington Irving starting in 1846.

Other works in the German language were: Aus der Geschichte der ersten Ansiedelungen in den Vereinigten Staaten (Extracts from the history of the first settlement of the United States; 1845), Die Colonisation von Neu England (The colonization of New England; 1847), imperfectly translated into English by William Hazlitt, Jr., Three tales originally published in German were translated into English by her daughter, appearing under the titles of Heloise, or the Unrevealed Secret (New York, 1850), Life's Discipline: a Tale of the Annals of Hungary (1851), and The Exiles (1853). Of her fiction, Exiles (orig. Die Auswanderer 1852) received the most critical acclaim and sold the most copies, and was republished as Woodhill, or the Ways of Providence (1856).

=== Later years ===
After the death of her husband in 1863, she returned to her native Germany and resided in Hamburg, where her son, Edward, was American consul. Her last work was published in the United States under the title of Fifteen Years, a Picture from the Last Century (New York, 1870). (Note: Originally Fünfzehn Jahre. Ein Zeitgemälde aus dem vorigen Jahrhundert (1868)) A collection of her tales, Gesammelte Novellen, with her biography by her daughter, was published in Leipzig (2 volumes, 1874).

== Selected works ==
anonymous

- Robinson, Therese Albertine L. (1836). "Popular Poetry of the Teutonic Nations". North American Review. XCI: 295.

as Talvj

- Talvj (1825), Psyche. Ein Taschenbuch – ein Taschenbuch für das Jahr 1825. Drei Erzählungen, Halle
- Talvj (1835), Volkslieder der Serben. Metrisch übersetzt und historisch eingeleitet von Talvj, 2 Bände, Leipzig und Halle
  - Band 1 and Band 2
- Talvj (1840), Versuch einer geschichtlichen Charakteristik der Volkslieder germanischer Nationen, Leipzig
- Talvj (1850), Heloise, or The Unrevealed Secret. A Tale, New York: D. Appleton & company
- Talvj (1853), The Exiles. A Tale (Internet Archive/pdf), New York: G. P. Putnam
- Talvj (1852), Marie Barcoczy. Historischer Roman, Leipzig
- Talvj (1834), Historical View of the Slavic Language in Its Various Dialects, Andover: Biblical Repository
  - Talvj (1850), Historical View of the Language and Literature of the Slavic Nations, Edward Robinson (preface), New York: Putnam - expanded
- (Translation) Walter Scott: Die Presbyterianer - Dritte Erzählungen meines Wirths. Zwickau 1826
- (Translation) Walter Scott: Der schwarze Zwerg - Erste der Erzählungen meines Wirths. Zwickau 1826
- (Translation) Pickering, John (1834), Über die indianischen Sprachen Amerikas, Talvi (tr.), Leipzig: Vogel
