= Edward Robinson (scholar) =

American biblical scholar (1794-1863)

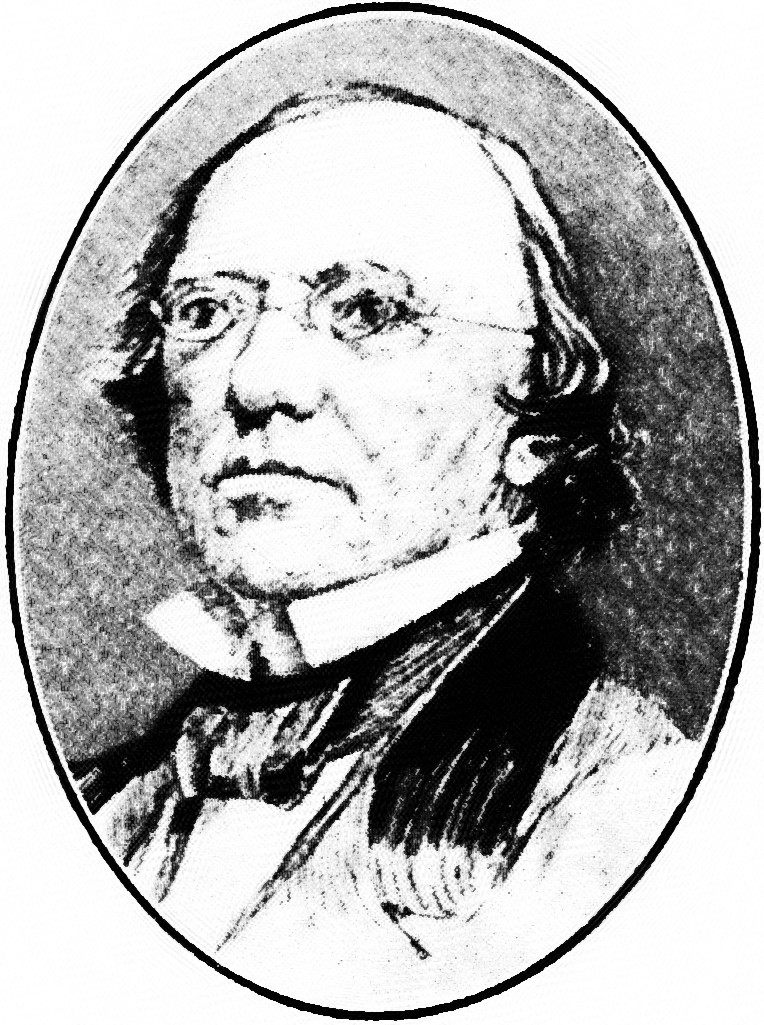
- Born: April 10, 1794; Southington, Connecticut, U.S.
- Died: January 27, 1863 (aged 68); New York City, New York, US
- Education: Hamilton College
- Spouse: Therese Albertine Luise von Jakob (m. 1828)
- Children: Edward

Edward Robinson (April 10, 1794 – January 27, 1863) was an American biblical scholar known for his magnum opus, Biblical Researches in Palestine, the first major work in biblical geography and biblical archaeology, which earned him the epithets "Father of Biblical Geography" and "Founder of Modern Palestinology."

He studied in the United States and Germany, centers of biblical scholarship and exploration of the Bible as history. He translated scriptural works from classical languages as well as German translations. His Greek and English Lexicon of the New Testament (1836; last revision, 1850) became a standard authority in the United States and was reprinted several times in Great Britain.

== Biography ==
Robinson was born in Southington, Connecticut, and raised on a farm. His father was a minister in the Congregational Church of the town for four decades. Robinson taught at schools in East Haven and Farmington in 1810–11 to earn money for college. He attended Hamilton College in Clinton, New York, where his maternal uncle, Seth Norton, was a professor. He graduated in 1816.

In 1821, he went to Andover, Massachusetts, where he published his translation of books i–ix, xviii and xix of the Iliad. There he aided Moses Stuart in the preparation of the second edition (1823) of the latter's Hebrew Grammar. He translated into English (1825) Wahl's Clavis Philologica Novi Testamenti.

Robinson went to Europe to study ancient languages, largely in Halle and Berlin (1826–30). While in Halle, in 1828 he married German writer Therese Albertine Luise von Jakob. After the couple returned to the United States, Robinson was appointed professor extraordinary of sacred literature at Andover Theological Seminary (1830–1833). Robinson founded the Biblical Repository (1831), which he edited for four years. In 1836, Robinson published both a translation of Wilhelm Gesenius' Hebrew Lexicon and a Greek New Testament Lexicon.

He established the Bibliotheca Sacra (1843), into which was merged the Biblical Repository. He spent three years in Boston working on a lexicon of scriptural Greek. Illness caused him to move to New York City. He was appointed as professor of biblical literature at Union Theological Seminary, serving from 1837 until his death. At the Union Theological Seminary, he served as the first librarian of the Burke Library.

== Exploration of Palestine ==
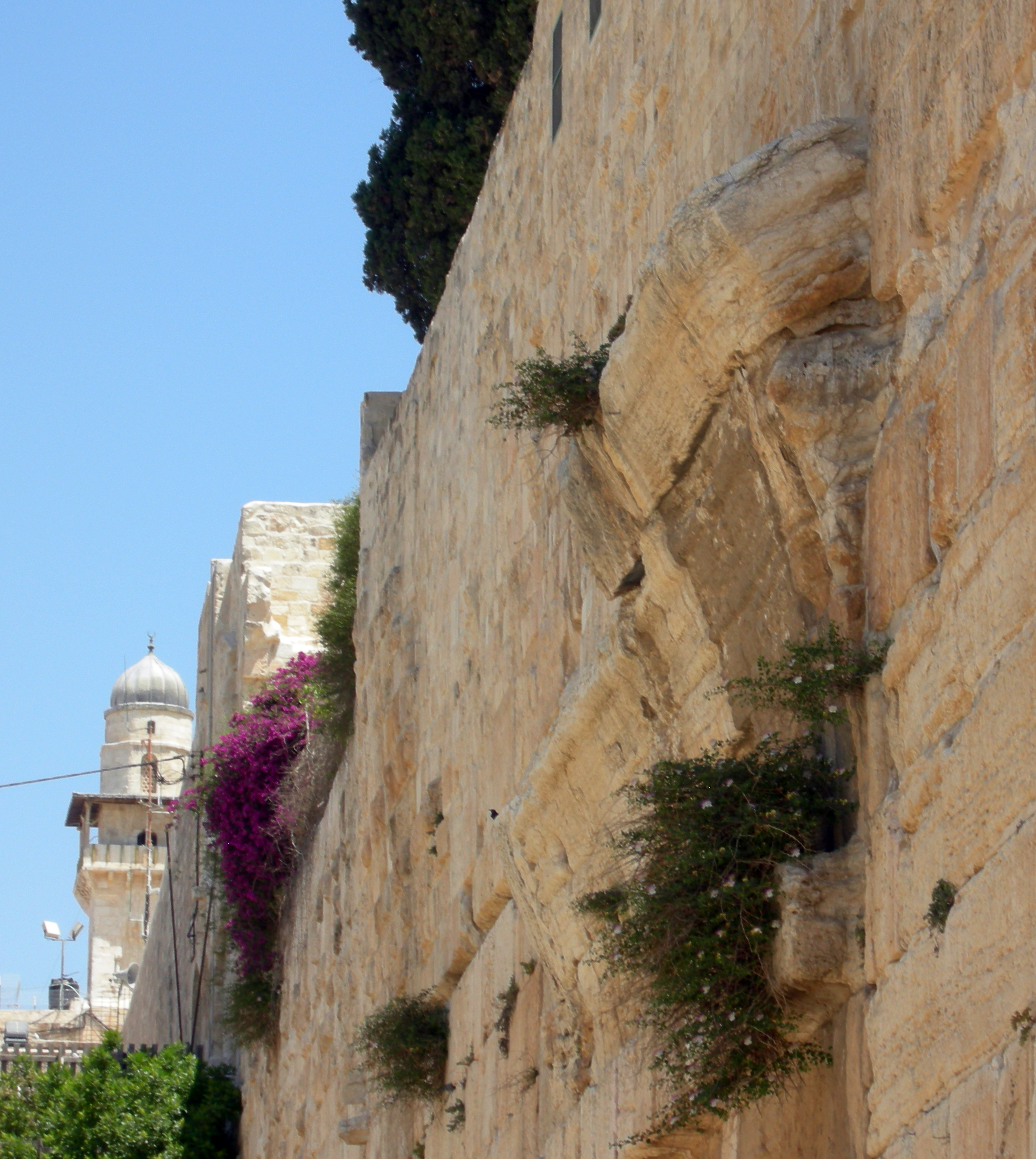
Robinson's Arch, on the south-western flank of the Temple Mount, once supported a staircase which led to the temple

Robinson traveled to Palestine in 1838 in the company of Eli Smith. He published Biblical Researches in Palestine in 1841, for which he was awarded the Gold Medal of the Royal Geographical Society in 1842. He was elected a Fellow of the American Academy of Arts and Sciences in 1847.

Together with Smith, Robinson made scores of identifications of ancient places referenced in the Bible. His work established his enduring reputation as a "founder" of biblical archaeology, and he influenced much of future archaeological field work. Examples of his finds in Jerusalem include the Siloam tunnel and Robinson's Arch in the Old City; the latter was named in his honor.

The two men returned to Ottoman Palestine in 1852 for further investigations. In 1856, the enlarged edition of Biblical Researches was published simultaneously in English and German. Among those who later acknowledged Robinson’s stature, in 1941 G. Ernest Wright, reviewing the pioneering survey contained in Nelson Glueck's The Other Side of the Jordan, makes a just comparison and fitting testimonial: "Glueck's explorations are second to none, unless it is those of Edward Robinson."

== Works ==
=== Books ===
- Dictionary of the Holy Bible for the Use of Schools and Young Persons (Boston, 1833)
- Greek and English Lexicon of the New Testament (1836; last revision, New York, 1850), based on the Clavis Philologica Novi Testamenti of Christian A. Wahl. This work superseded his translation of Wahl's work, becoming a standard authority in the United States. It was several times reprinted in Great Britain.
- Biblical Researches in Palestine and Adjacent Countries (three volumes, Boston and London, 1841; German edition, Halle, 1841; second edition, enlarged, 1856, published in both English and German)
- A Harmony of the Gospels in Greek in the General Order of Le Clerc and Newcome, with Newcome's Notes: Printed from the Text with the Various Readings of Knapp (1834)
- Greek Harmony of the Gospels (1845; second edition, 1851). The Greek text is the Textus Receptus of Elzevir (reproduced by August Hahn).
- English Harmony of the Gospels (1846)
- Memoir of Rev. William Robinson, with some Account of his Ancestors in this Country (printed privately, New York, 1859) This is a sketch of his father, who for 41 years was pastor of the Congregational church in Southington, Connecticut.
- Physical Geography of the Holy Land (New York and London, 1865). This is a supplement to his Biblical Researches, and was edited by Mrs. Robinson after his death.
- Revised editions of the Greek and English Harmonies, edited by Matthew B. Riddle, were published in 1885 and 1886 after Robinson's death.

=== Edits and translations ===
- Philipp Karl Buttmann, Greek Grammar (1823; third edition, 1851)
- Georg Benedikt Winer, Grammar of New Testament Greek (1825), with Moses Stuart
- Christian Abraham Wahl, Clavis Philologica Novi Testamenti (1825)
- Wilhelm Gesenius, Hebrew Lexicon of the Old Testament, including the Biblical Chaldee (1836; fifth edition, with corrections and additions, 1854)

=== Revisions ===
- Augustine Calmet, Dictionary of the Bible (Boston, 1832)
