= Walter S. Gamertsfelder =

- Born: Missing required parameter 1=month! , 1885
- Died: 1967 (aged 81–82)
- Occupation: University President
- Years active: 1943-1945

President of Ohio University
- In office 1943–1945

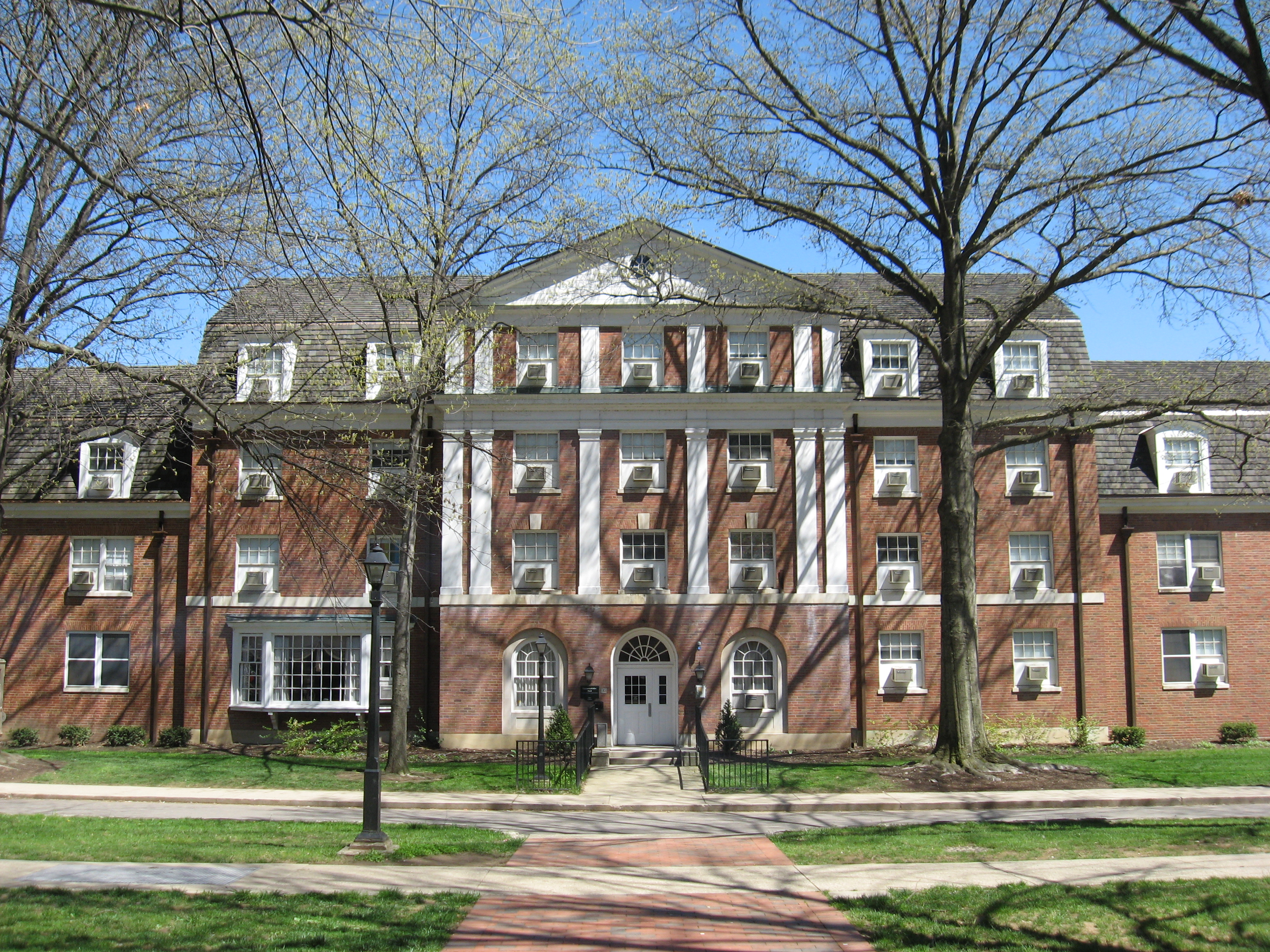
Gamertsfelder Hall, named for Walter Gamertsfelder

Walter Sylvester Gamertsfelder (1885 – 1967) was a professor of philosophy, dean and thirteenth president of Ohio University, serving during the final years of World War II from 1943 to 1945.

He received his A.B. degree from North Central College at Naperville, IL, in 1910, followed by a Bachelor of Divinity degree from the Evangelical Theological Seminary at Naperville (today, the Garrett-Evangelical Theological Seminary. After a short period serving as a pastor at a church in Akron, Ohio, he attended Ohio State University, where he completed a PhD in philosophy in 1920, with a thesis in British idealism, entitled "Thought, Existence and Reality as Viewed by F.H. Bradley and Bernard Bosanquet." (His dissertation adviser was the idealist, Joseph Alexander Leighton.) He was later (1945) awarded an honorary LL.D. degree by North Central College, and an honorary L.H.D. from Bowling Green State University in 1951.

Gamertsfelder was appointed a member of the faculty of philosophy and religion at Ohio University in 1921. Called to serve on an interim basis, Gamertsfelder came to the presidency of Ohio University from a dual deanship of the College of Arts and Sciences and the Graduate College.

World War II created serious problems for the university while he served. These included accommodation of faculty leaves for service in the nation's war effort and the initiation of programs for faculty retraining and reassignment as enrollment dwindled to just over two hundred men, and needs for teaching Army Specialized Training Corpsmen and Reservists who were assigned to the campus developed. At the same time, his son served in the Philippines. A memorial service in December 1945 honored 221 Ohio U. alumni who died in the war.

Upon completion of his term, Gamertsfelder returned to his deanships. Upon reaching the mandatory retirement age for administrators in 1951, he returned to teaching as a full professor of philosophy and ethics where the mandatory faculty retirement age was 70. He was also granted the title Trustee Professor, the first person to be so honored. Gamertsfelder Hall, located on East Green, was built on the Ohio University campus in 1956 is named in his honor.

== See also ==
- List of presidents of Ohio University
