= Irma Voigt =

American college dean

Irma E. Voigt
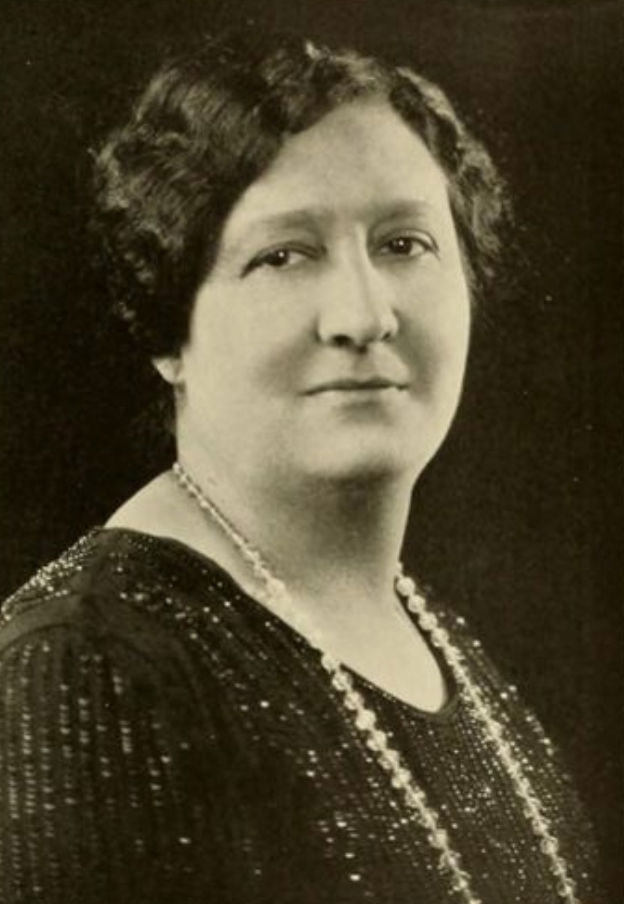
- Irma Voigt, from the 1926 yearbook of Ohio University
- Born: September 1, 1882; Quincy, Illinois
- Died: May 9, 1953 (aged 70); Athens, Ohio
- Occupations: Dean of Women, Ohio University

Irma Elizabeth Voigt (September 1, 1882 – May 9, 1953) was an American educator. She was the first Dean of Women at Ohio University; she held that office from 1913 until her retirement in 1949.

== Early life ==
Voigt was born in Quincy, Illinois, the daughter of Henry G. Voigt and Mary Tuffli Voigt. In 1913 she earned a PhD in German at the University of Illinois; her master's thesis and doctoral dissertation were both about German-American writer Therese Albertine Luise Robinson, also known as "Frau Talvj".

== Career ==
Voigt taught school and was a high school principal in Illinois as a young woman. She was the first Dean of Women at Ohio University in Athens, Ohio, holding that title from 1913 to 1949. She recalled that, upon arrival in 1913, the president of the university said to her, "I don't know what a dean of women's for, and I suspect you don't know what you're to do. Get busy and find out."

As dean, Voigt held weekly fireside chat sessions in her home, and led Saturday hikes. She also wrote revues, ceremonies, and pageants for the university, and directed the productions. She was president of the Ohio state chapter of the American Association of University Women (AAUW) and served on the association's national board. In 1922, she spoke to audiences of girls in Nashville about the "three B's" of a happy and successful life, which she listed as "be buoyant, be generous, be idealistic." From 1924 to 1928 she was the first president of the Ohio Association of Deans of Women. In 1936, she was president of the National Association of Deans of Women. She served on the national board of the YWCA.

== Publications ==
- The Life and Works of Mrs. Therese Robinson (1913)
- "Spiritualizing the Relations Between Men and Women Students" (1926)
- "National Association of Deans of Women" (1937)
- "The Report of the Future Policy Committee: The American Council of Guidance and Personnel Associations" (1939)

== Personal life ==
Voigt lived and traveled with the chair of the Ohio University English department, Edith Wray, at a home nicknamed "the Irmatage", and was often seen on campus with a companion dog, Lady. Voigt died in 1953, in Athens, at the age of 70. There is an all female residence hall at Ohio University named Voigt Hall in her memory. Ohio University Libraries holds Voigt's papers, and other materials related to her life and career.
