= James Irvine (educator) =

Second president of Ohio University

- Born: Missing required parameter 1=month! , 1793
- Died: 1835 (aged 41–42)
- Occupation(s): University President; Presbyterian Minister

President of Ohio University
- In office 1822–1824

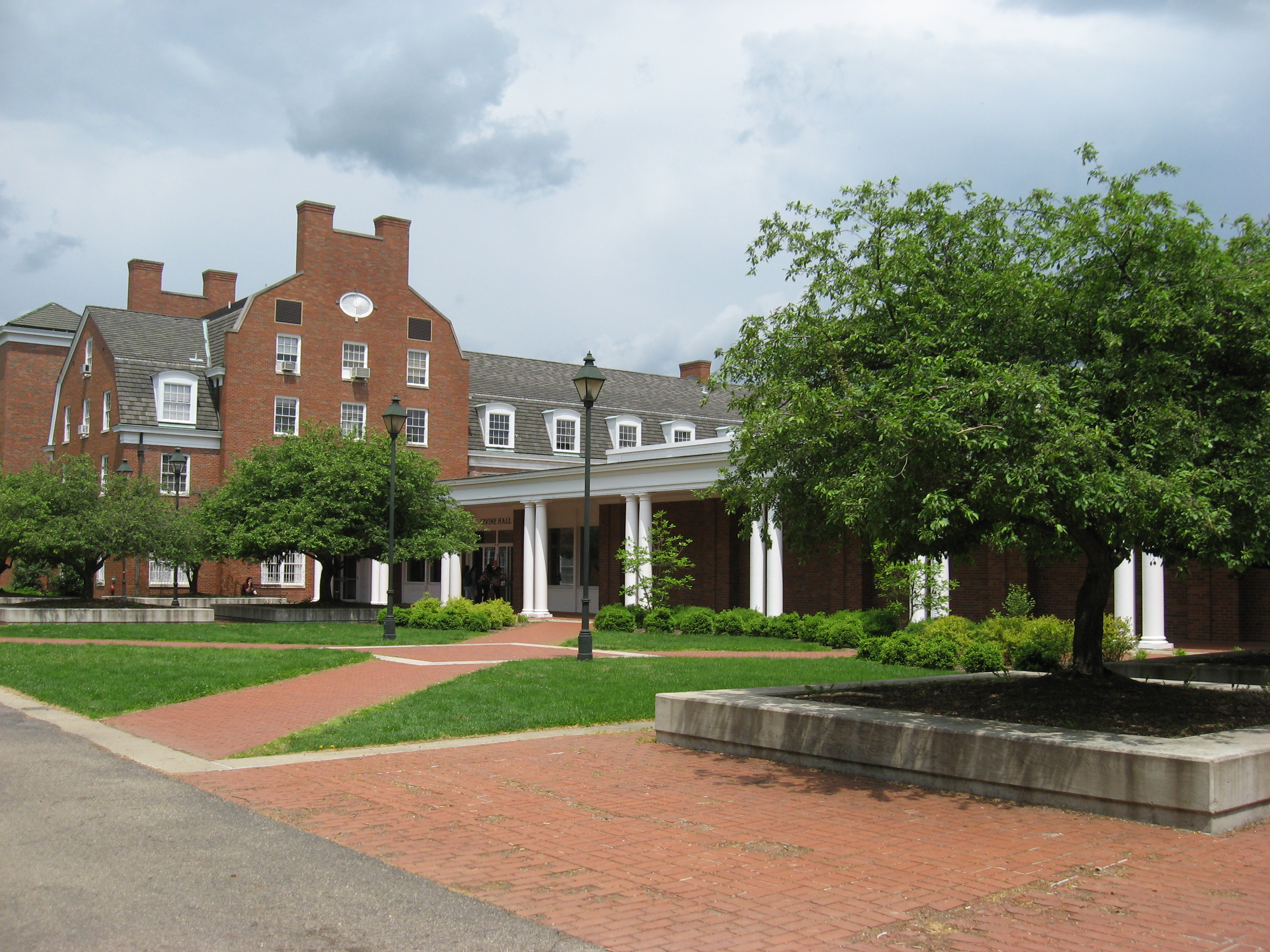
Irvine Hall at Ohio University, named for James Irvine

James Irvine (1793–1835) was an educator and Presbyterian minister who served as the second president of Ohio University, located in Athens, Ohio, from 1822 to 1824.

Irvine, a native of Washington County, New York, graduated from Union College, and was hired as a professor of mathematics at Ohio University in 1821. He became university president in 1822 and served only a year before taking a leave of absence due to poor health. Irvine never returned from his leave and resigned in 1824. He was pastor at West Hebron, New York, 1824–1831, and of the Second Presbyterian Church of New York City, 1831–1835. He died in New York City, on November 25, 1835.

== See also ==
- List of presidents of Ohio University
