= Alfred Ryors =

American university president (1812–1858)

2nd President of Indiana University
- In office 1852–1853
- Preceded by: Andrew Wylie
- Succeeded by: William Mitchel Daily

5th President of Ohio University
- In office 1848–1852
- Preceded by: William Holmes McGuffey
- Succeeded by: Solomon Howard

Personal details
- Born: June 23, 1812 Philadelphia, Pennsylvania, U.S.
- Died: May 8, 1858 (aged 45) Danville, Kentucky, U.S.
- Resting place: Bellevue Cemetery, Danville, Kentucky
- Profession: College educator and Presbyterian minister

Academic background
- Education: Jefferson College

Academic work
- Discipline: Mathematics
- Institutions: Lafayette College; Indiana University; Ohio University; Centre College

Ecclesiastical career
- Church: Presbyterian
- Ordained: 1838

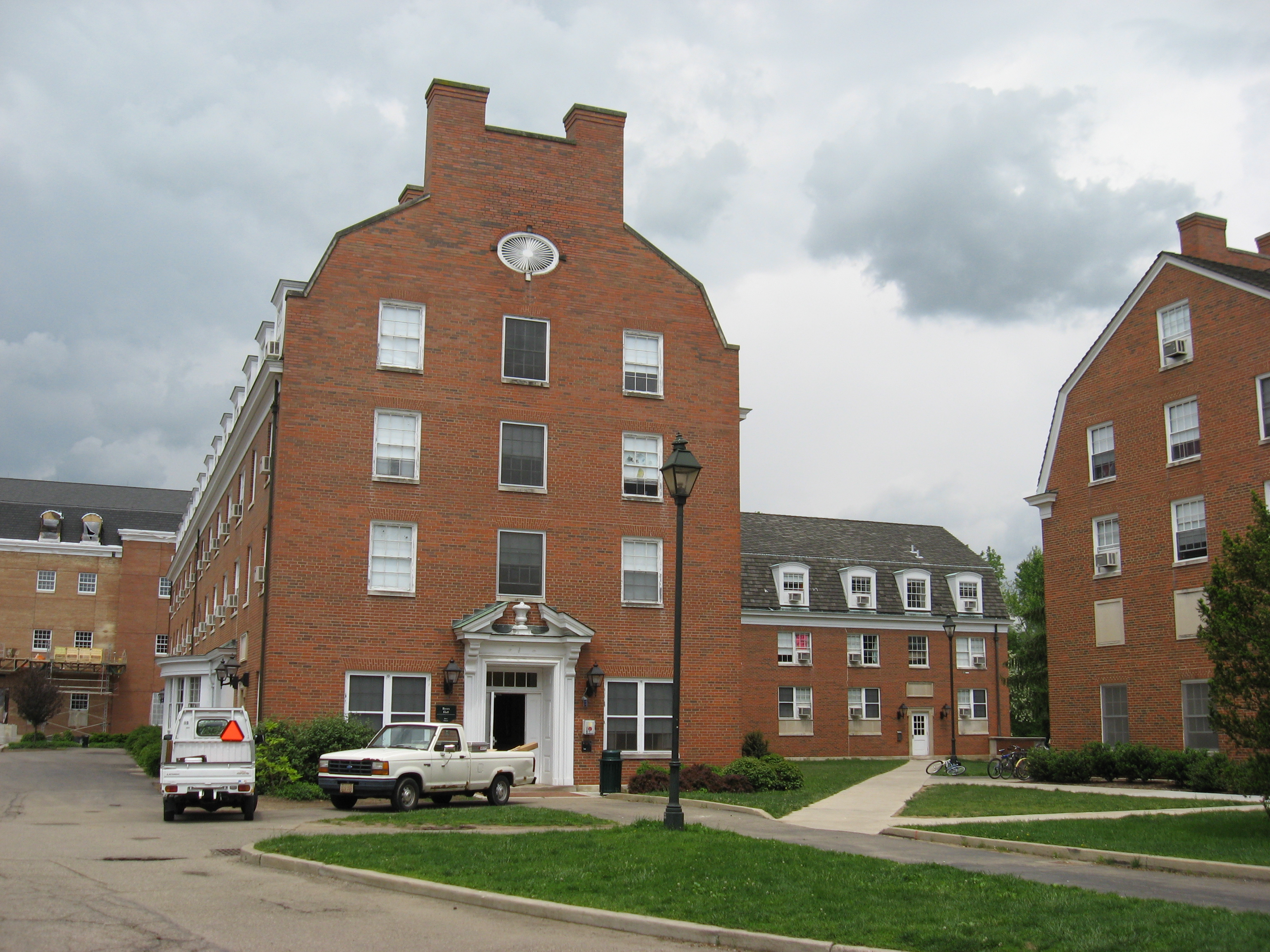
Ryors Hall at Ohio University, named for Alfred Ryors

Alfred Ryors (June 23, 1812–May 8, 1858) served as the second president of Indiana University and the fifth president of Ohio University.

== Early life and education ==
Born June 23, 1812, in Philadelphia, Pennsylvania, Ryors was orphaned at an early age. He lived with family friends until 1823, when he began studying with the Presbyterian Church in preparation for ministry. In 1831, he entered Jefferson College, Canonsburg, Pennsylvania, where he studied for two years before leaving to teach Latin and Greek in the School of C.J. Halderman, at Bristol, Pennsylvania. He returned to Jefferson College in 1834 and graduated in 1835.

== Professional Background ==
Upon receipt of his degree, Ryors accepted an appointment as Principal of the Academic Department in Lafayette College in Easton, Pennsylvania, a position he held for one year before moving on to Ohio University, where he taught mathematics. He remained in Ohio until 1843, when he accepted a professorship at Indiana University, again teaching mathematics. Here he stayed until 1848, when he returned to Ohio University to serve as its president.

== Tenure at Indiana University ==
Faced with the death of its first president in 1851, Indiana University sought to fill the presidency with Ryors. Ryors accepted, resigned his position at Ohio University and returned to Bloomington the fall of 1852. Disappointed with conditions at the university, Ryors resigned in 1853 and went on to become professor of mathematics at Centre College in Danville, Kentucky, a position he held until his death in 1858.

== See also ==
- List of presidents of Ohio University

Academic offices
Preceded by William Holmes McGuffey	President of Ohio University; 1848 – 1852	Succeeded by Solomon Howard
Preceded by Andrew Wylie	President of Indiana University; 1852 – 1853	Succeeded by William Mitchel Daily
