= Jacob Lindley =

American academic administrator (1774-1857)

- Born: June 13, 1774
- Died: January 29, 1857 (aged 82)
- Education: Jefferson College
- Spouse: Hannah
- Children: Daniel Lindley
- Church: Presbyterian

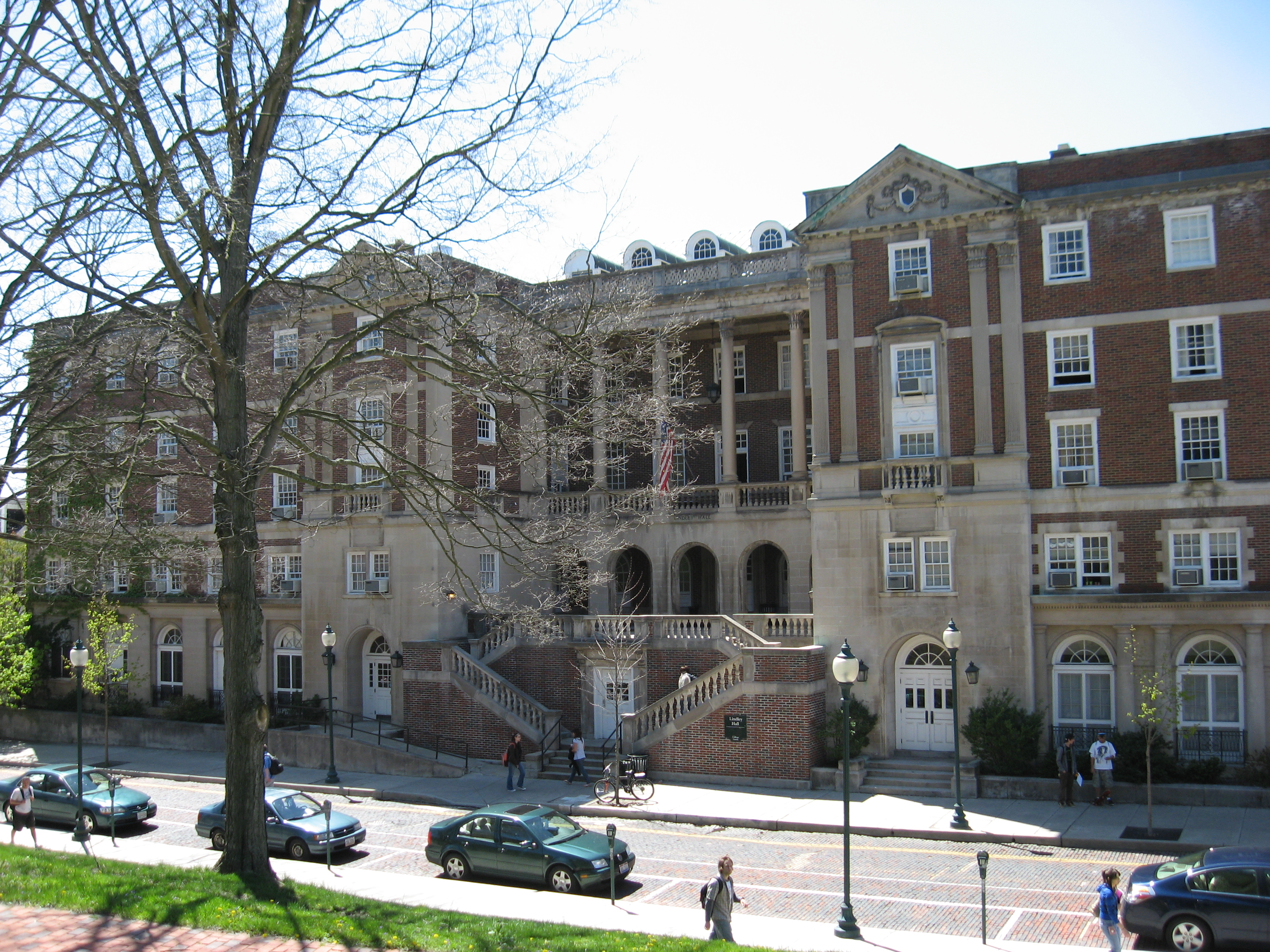
Lindley Hall at Ohio University, named for Jacob Lindley

Jacob Lindley (June 13, 1774 – January 29, 1857) was the first president of Ohio University, between 1809 and 1822.

== Life ==
Lindley was educated at Thaddeus Dod's log college (later Jefferson College) and College of New Jersey.

He was one of the founders of the Franklin Literary Society at Jefferson College. Jacob Lindley married Hannah.

Jacob and Hannah's eldest child was Daniel Lindley who was born in Pennsylvania on August 24, 1801. He was a missionary in southern Africa. He and his wife Lucy founded the Inanda Seminary School in 1869. Lindley was pastor to the Voortrekkers in the first Dutch Reformed Church in the Orange Free State.

== See also ==
- List of presidents of Ohio University
