= William Henry Scott (university president) =

American academic administrator

- Born: September 1, 1840; Chauncey, Ohio
- Died: January 11, 1937 (aged 96)
- Occupation: University President
- Years active: 1872-1883

President of Ohio University
- In office 1872–1883

William Henry Scott (September 1, 1840 – January 11, 1937), born in Athens, Ohio, was the seventh President of Ohio University from 1872 to 1883, and the third President of Ohio State University from 1883 to 1895.

Scott received his college degree from Ohio University. He was the first alumnus of the university to be its president.

Scott was born in Chauncey, Ohio which is in Athens County, Ohio as is Ohio University. He was of Scotch-Irish descent, his great-grandfather Andrew Scott and his grandfather John Scott having immigrated from Ireland in 1790. His father Alexander Scott was born in Zanesville, Ohio in 1808. His father was a miller and moved the family to McConnellsville, Ohio when he was two. His early education was at a Methodist run school in McConnelville until he was 10 when a public school was opened in that place. He began at the high school there when he was 12 in 1852. He began as a teacher at a small rural school at age 16 in 1856. In 1859 his family relocated to Athens, Ohio and he enrolled in Ohio University.

Scott earned his college degree in 1862. He was the same year he was made superintendent of public schools in Athens, Ohio. In this position, he taught most of the courses at the high school and oversaw all the other schools and teachers in the district. He then became a Methodist minister in 1864. He was made the pastor at Chillicothe, Ohio. In 1867 he was made a pastor in Columbus, Ohio. In 1869 he was made a professor of Greek language at Ohio University. He became president of Ohio University in 1872. As president of Ohio University he managed to get the endowment reorganized and also get legislative support for the university.

In 1883 Scott left Ohio University to take the lead of Ohio State University. He was given a chair in philosophy at the same time he was made university president. He only was president of the university for two years but continued with the chair of philosophy until he retired in 1910 at age 70.

== See also ==
- List of presidents of Ohio State University
- List of presidents of Ohio University

Academic offices
Preceded by Walter Quincy Scott	Ohio State University President; June 6, 1883 – June 30, 1895	Succeeded by James Hulme Canfield
