= Vernon Alden =

American academic (1923–2020)

Vernon R. Alden
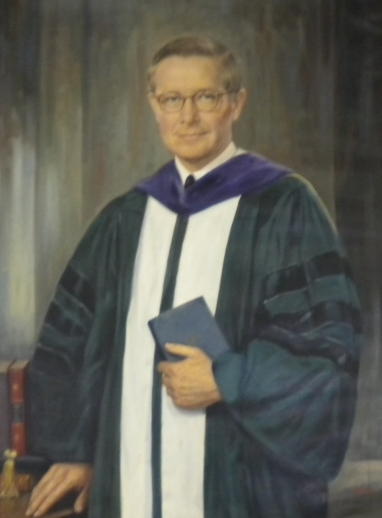
- Portrait (Alden Library)

15th President of Ohio University

Personal details
- Born: April 7, 1923 Chicago, Illinois
- Died: July 22, 2020 (aged 97) Boston, Massachusetts, U.S.
- Education: Brown University; Harvard Business School

Vernon Roger Alden (April 7, 1923 – June 22, 2020) was an American scholar, businessman, philanthropist and the 15th president of Ohio University. After graduating from Brown University and Harvard Business School, he stayed at the business school as an associate dean. After his term as president at Ohio University, he worked at the Boston Company as chairman for several years.

== Early life ==
Alden was born in April 1923 in Chicago, Illinois, the son of Hildur Pauline (Johnson) and Arvid W. Alden, a Protestant minister. As a young boy, he attended public school in Illinois and Rhode Island. During World War II, Alden attended the Navy Officers Japanese Language School in Boulder, Colorado, before serving on the aircraft carrier USS Saratoga. Alden received a degree in English literature at Brown University and an MBA from Harvard Business School.

== Work at Ohio University ==
Alden was 38 years old when he came to Ohio University from his position as the associate dean of the Harvard Business School. During his time as president, the enrollment and faculty on the Athens Campus doubled and enrollment in the university’s five branch campuses nearly tripled. During his presidency, Alden oversaw expansion of the campus area through urban renewal. The size of Athens’ campus increased by more than 750 acres. The development of South Green, the completion of West Green, and the construction of a new regional airport all happened during his presidency. His efforts in urban renewal exceeded developing the university and overflowed to improving economic growth in southeastern Ohio. He rerouted the flood-prone Hocking River, which annually drowned the university every spring, constructed the Appalachian Highway Network to provide easier access to Athens for visitors, and built six regional branches of Ohio University in both eastern and southern Ohio.

Alden was an advocate for the expansion of research and for new academic programs. He led the development of programs such as the Ohio Fellows Program, the Cutler Program of Individualized Studies, the Honors College, and the Black Studies Institute. In addition to academic programs, Alden implemented university remissions for university employees and their families, sabbatical leaves, and the Ohio University Press. Increased rights for faculty and students were evidenced by a Faculty Senate and Student-Faculty Mediation Board. Vernon attracted President Lyndon B. Johnson to the Athens campus to announce the Great Society Program in May 1964.

In 1965, Alden was the subject of a Life Magazine feature showcasing his accomplishments as well as the challenges facing academic administrations in the wake of open admissions policies. Upon his retirement from Ohio University the Board of Trustees dedicated the new library in his name, the Vernon Roger Alden Library. Alden left the University in 1969.

== Professional achievements ==
Alden became Chairman of the Boston Company and the Boston Safe Deposit and Trust Company in 1969. During his tenure, to 1978, the company quadrupled its assets. Alden transformed the company from a somewhat local financial company into an international organization and attracted to its board of directors incredibly successful executives including the chief executive officers of Armco Steel, TransWorld Airlines, Continental Oil, Royal Dutch Shell in the United Kingdom, the Dole Company in Hawaii and Lee Iacocca, the then president of Ford. Alden and his associates developed new branches of the Boston Company including the Boston Consulting Group, the Financial Strategies Group, Institutional Investors, Rinfret-Boston Economic Advisory Services, and an oil and gas investment subsidiary in Texas. These new entities allowed the Boston Company to expand outside of Massachusetts to acquire investment counseling firms across the United States. By the end of the 1970s the Boston Company became the United States’ 15th largest investment-management firm. Alden was fascinated by organizations that were hired by incredibly wealthy families like the Rockefellers and the Fords to manage their assets. He recognized that similar assistance was needed by families less wealthy. He took this idea and transformed it into the Financial Strategies Group, an organization created to evaluate the assets of less wealthy families, offer advice on estate planning, manage resources, and enable them to invest. Among his first clients were John Glenn and George Webster.

== Influence in Japan ==
He became president of the Japan Society of Boston in 1969 and obtained a five-year grant from the US-Japan Friendship Commission. The grant provided the company with the opportunity to hire an Executive Director and to expand the company by increasing membership to more than 2,000 with 150 additional corporate members. Alden has been a member of the Harvard Program on US-Japan Relations, the Massachusetts-Hokkaido Sister State Committee, the Newport-Shimoda Black Ships Festival, and the Boston-Kyoto Sister City Foundation.

== Personal ==
Alden and his wife Marion had four children, Robert, Anne, James and David. His wife predeceased him. He died in June 2020 at the age of 97.

== See also ==
- The Decade of the University: Ohio University and the Alden Years. Meno Lovenstein. Athens, Ohio: Lawhead Press, 1971. A philosophic account of the university in the 1960s
- Presidents, Kings, Astronauts, and Ball Players: Fascinating People I Have Known. Vernon R. Alden. Vantage Press, 2009. ISBN 978-0-533-16021-1
- Speaking for Myself: The Personal Reflections of Vernon R. Alden, University President, Corporate Director, International Entrepreneur. Vernon R. Alden. Athens: Ohio University Libraries, 1997.
- Vernon R. Alden: An Oral History. Athens: Ohio University Libraries, 1999. ISBN 978-0-9650743-4-6
- List of presidents of Ohio University
