= Margaret "Maggie" Boyd =

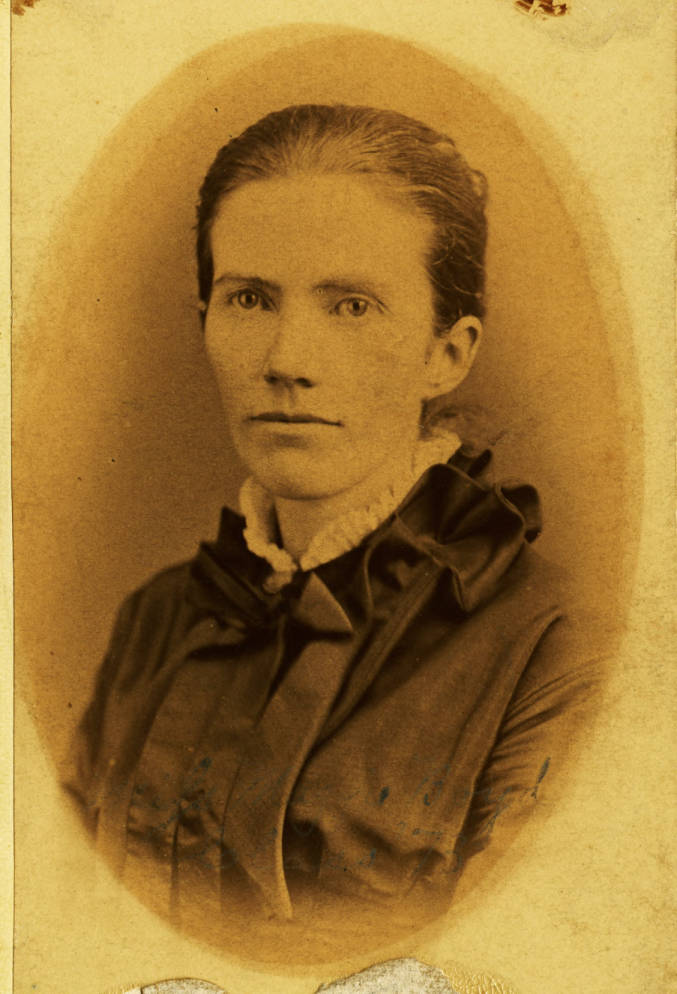
- Margaret "Maggie" Boyd, circa 1873
- Born: April 7, 1845; Athens County, Ohio, USA
- Died: October 10, 1905; Cincinnati, Hamilton County, Ohio, USA

Margaret "Maggie" Boyd (1846–1905) was the first female graduate of Ohio University. After receiving her bachelor's degree in 1873 and master's degree in 1876 at Ohio University, she became a faculty member at Cincinnati Wesleyan College for Women. She subsequently returned to Athens, Ohio. Her legacy includes the Margaret Boyd Scholars Program and Boyd Hall at Ohio University.

== Early life ==
Margaret Boyd was born in Athens County, Ohio. She is the youngest of nine children.

== Experience at Ohio University ==
Boyd earned her B.A. in 1873 and went on to get her M.A. in 1876, both at Ohio University. On Sunday, June 22, 1873 Margaret wrote in her diary that she enjoyed her lecturer. The lecturer encouraged her all-male classmates to be proud that they were a part of the class graduating the first woman.

== Career ==
Boyd took her first job out of college in Cincinnati. In her diary, Margaret wrote about not wanting to leave her friends and family behind because she felt a sense of community in Athens. She eventually moved back to Athens to teach at Athens High School.

== Legacy ==
Boyd's diary and personal correspondence are stored in the Ohio University archives and have been used for research on women's lives and higher education in the late 1800s. The first women's dormitory at Ohio University was named in honor of Margaret Boyd. Ohio University is also home to the Margaret Boyd Scholars Program, an undergraduate scholar's group which focuses on leadership and advancing women's scholarship.
