= Lori Stewart Gonzalez =

American language pathologist and academic administrator

23rd President of Ohio University
- Incumbent
- Assumed office July 1, 2023
- Preceded by: Hugh Sherman

Interim President of the University of Louisville
- In office January 2022 – January 2023
- Preceded by: Neeli Bendapudi
- Succeeded by: Kim Schatzel

Personal details
- Born: Lori Lee Stewart; October 20, 1957 (age 68) Mount Vernon, Kentucky, U.S.
- Party: Democratic
- Spouse: Randall Gonzalez (m. 1988)
- Children: 1
- Education: University of Kentucky (BA); Eastern Kentucky University (MA); University of Florida (PhD)

Academic background
- Thesis: Relationship Between Severity of Phonological Disability and Generalization of Learning of /s/ Plus Stop Clusters in Young Children. (1989)
- Doctoral advisor: Alice Tanner Dyson

Lori Lee Stewart Gonzalez (née Stewart; born October 20, 1957) is an American speech pathologist and academic administrator serving as the 23rd president of Ohio University since 2023. She was the interim president of the University of Louisville from 2022 to 2023.

== Early life and education ==
Lori Lee Stewart was born the eldest of three daughters on October 20, 1957, in Mount Vernon, Kentucky, to Ruby Harmon and Wayne Stewart. She completed a B.A. in speech-pathology and audiology from the University of Kentucky. She earned a M.A. in communication disorders from Eastern Kentucky University. She earned a Ph.D. in communication sciences and disorders from the University of Florida. Her 1989 dissertation was titled, Relationship Between Severity of Phonological Disability and Generalization of Learning of /s/ Plus Stop Clusters in Young Children. Alice Tanner Dyson was her doctoral advisor. Lori Stewart married Randall John Gonzalez in April 1988. They have one son together.

== Academic career ==
In 1988, Gonzalez joined the faculty at Southern Illinois University Carbondale as an assistant professor. In 1991, she became an assistant professor in the communication sciences and disorders program at the University of Kentucky. She later became its associate dean of academic affairs and in 2005, the dean of the college of health sciences. Gonzalez was the provost and executive vice chancellor at Appalachian State University. She was a special advisor to the senior vice president for academic affairs at the University of North Carolina General Administration. Gonzalez was the vice chancellor for academic, faculty, and student affairs at the University of Tennessee Health Science Center. She was the executive vice president and provost of the University of Louisville. She succeeded Neeli Bendapudi in January 2022 as its interim president. She served in the role until January 2023 when Kim Schatzel was hired.

== Ohio University Presidency ==
In March 2023, Lori Stewart Gonzalez was unanimously elected by the Ohio University Board of Trustees to become the 23rd and first woman President in the institution's 219-year history. Her leadership took effect July 1, 2023 and she succeeded Hugh Sherman. Her inauguration took place October 18, 2023, and included an original music composition by her son John Clay Gonzalez entitled "Our Place."

During her first year helming the university, President Stewart Gonzalez launched several high-profile projects. First was a community-wide dynamic strategy planning process to garner insights from stakeholders on the university's future over the next six years, and she charged four working groups to synthesize the ideas into actionable change. She delivered maiden speeches and toured the facilities at each regionalized campus to promote a "one university" organizational model and strengthen bonds with each of their unique towns; and she instituted University Updates, a monthly announcement and forum session held at the Baker University Center to provide administrative insights and share in community dialogues. Her first year's efforts were favorable with the Board of Trustees, and they voted to give her a raise.
