= Roderick McDavis =

American academic administrator

Roderick J. McDavis
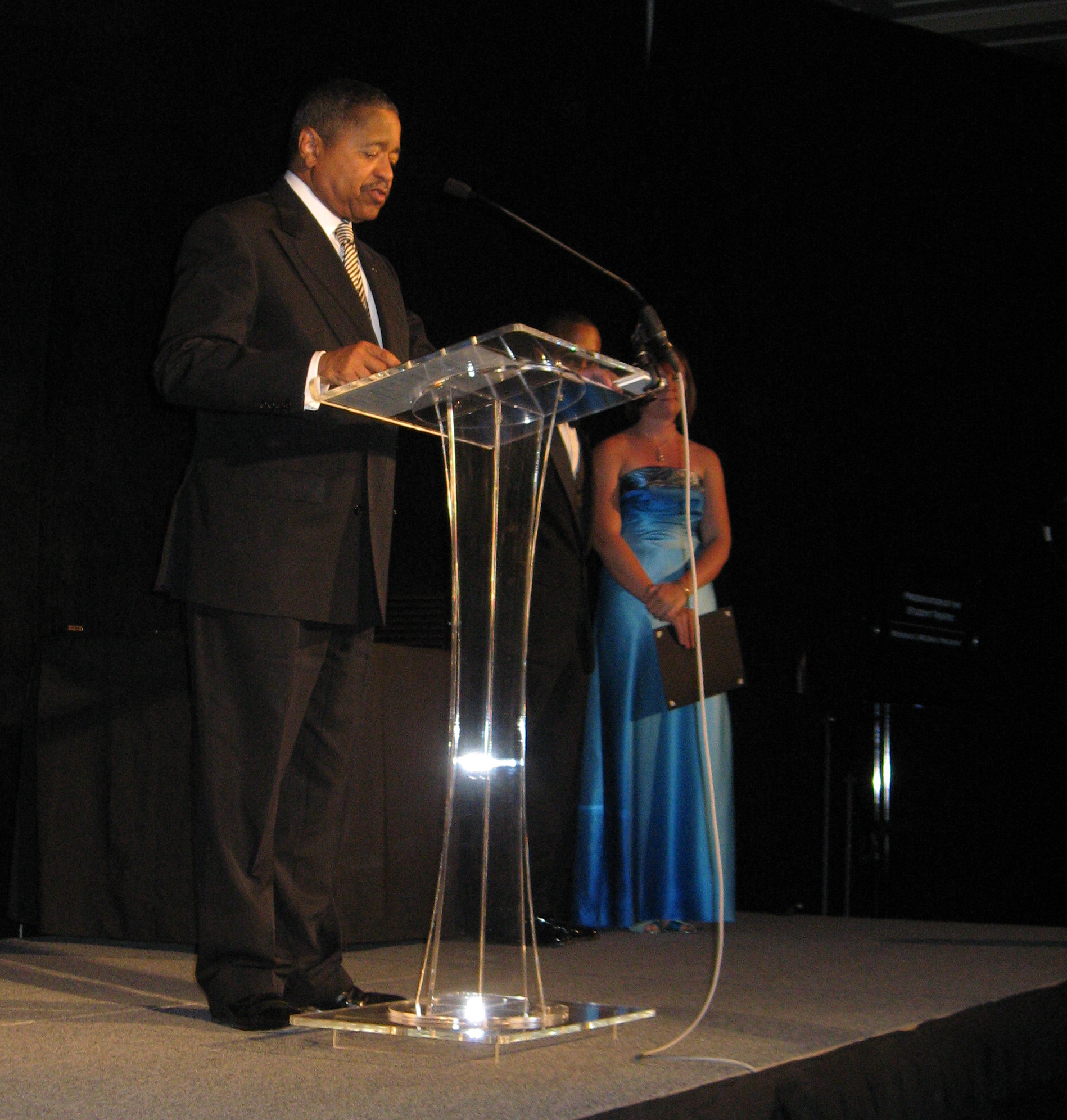
- McDavis speaks in Ohio University's Baker University Center (May 2009)
- Born: October 17, 1948 (age 78); Dayton, Ohio
- Education: Ohio University
- Known for: 20th President of Ohio University
- Scientific career
- Fields: Public Service
- Workplaces: Ohio University; University of Florida; University of Arkansas; Virginia Commonwealth University
- Website: Official website

Roderick J. McDavis (born October 17, 1948) was the 20th president of Ohio University, located in Athens, Ohio.

== Academic career ==
McDavis began his academic career as an undergraduate at Ohio University and earning a B.A. He was a runner on the men's varsity track team. He later completed an M.A. degree at the University of Dayton and a Ph.D. degree at the University of Toledo, both in the field of higher education. He was a professor of education in the Department of Counselor Education at the University of Florida from 1974 to 1989 and an associate dean of the graduate school and minority programs at the same university from 1984 to 1989.

He served as dean of the College of Education and professor of counselor education at the University of Arkansas, Fayetteville, from 1989 to 1994 and as director of the Arkansas Academy for Leadership Training and School-Based Management from 1992 to 1994. He was dean of the College of Education and professor of education at the University of Florida from 1994–1999. He subsequently served as provost and vice president for academic affairs and professor of education at Virginia Commonwealth University in Richmond, Va., from 1999 to 2004.

McDavis became the 20th president of the Ohio University on July 1, 2004. He is the first Ohioan of African ancestry and only the second alumnus to lead Ohio University as president. He is a member of Omega Psi Phi fraternity.

On March 10, 2016, McDavis announced his retirement, effective June 30, 2017. The university subsequently announced, on December 9, 2016, that he would be stepping down earlier, on February 17, 2017, reportedly to accept a position as managing principal and chief executive officer of AGB Search.

== Professional achievements ==
In 1995, McDavis was named Person of the Year in Education by The Gainesville Sun. He also received the Post-Secondary Outstanding Educator Award from the North Central Florida Chapter of Phi Delta Kappa in 1996. McDavis was the recipient of the 1997 Black Achiever's Award in Education from the Florida Conference of Black State Legislators. In 2007, McDavis was one of only six president and CEO-level leaders in the state to be recognized with a Leadership Ohio Award of Excellence.

Upon becoming president of Ohio University in 2004, one of the first major initiatives he led was the development of a strategic planning process. That process led to the creation and implementation of Vision OHIO, the university's first comprehensive strategic plan. McDavis and his wife, Deborah, helped launch two key Ohio University scholarship initiatives — the Urban Scholars and Appalachian Scholars programs. The two programs were created to support one of McDavis's primary goals, which is to increase the diversity of the student population and enhance opportunities for high-achieving students who may not otherwise have an opportunity to get a college education. The Urban Scholars Program was established in 2004 and the Appalachian Scholars Program was established in 2005. These programs provide academically gifted students from disproportionately represented backgrounds with full-tuition scholarships as well as support for textbooks and professional development opportunities. The Urban Scholars Program focuses on students from major metropolitan areas, while the Appalachian Scholars Program selects students from twenty-nine Appalachian counties in Ohio.

On October 28, 2008, McDavis created another important initiative to support increasing diversity. The Interlink Alliance, an educational partnership, was formed with nine member institutions, including Ohio University and eight historically black colleges and universities. In addition to Ohio University, members of the Interlink Alliance include Spelman College in Atlanta; Hampton University in Hampton, Va.; Wilberforce University and Central State University in Wilberforce, Ohio; Johnson C. Smith University in Charlotte, N.C.; North Carolina Central University in Durham, N.C.; South Carolina State University in Orangeburg, S.C.; and Virginia State University in Petersburg, Va.

McDavis sought to focus efforts on enhancing the university's reputation as an institution of academic excellence. The success of Ohio University's Office of Nationally Competitive Awards speaks to the impact of those efforts, with a university record set in the 2007–08 academic year. In addition, Ohio University's forensics team ranked seventh in the 2009 National Forensics Association National Tournament and the Ohio University College of Business earned a spot on the 2009 Business Week list of the top 50 undergraduate business programs in the nation. The university's scholar-athletes have excelled academically, with the volleyball and softball teams recognized by the NCAA as being in the top 10 percent in their respective sports' Academic Progress Rate.

McDavis increased environmental integrity for the institution with executive sustainability initiatives. In 2007, he became the first four-year public university president in Ohio to sign the American College & University Presidents Climate Commitment, a campaign to reduce global warming through research, education, and institutional commitments to climate neutrality. McDavis appointed a Presidential Advisory Council for Sustainability Planning, composed of Ohio University faculty, staff, and students, to develop recommendations for a comprehensive sustainability plan and university-wide climate action plan. He attended the Climate Leadership Summit in Chicago in August 2009 featuring leaders such as keynote speaker and former U.S. President Bill Clinton.

In 2009, he was elected to a third consecutive term as chair of the presidents of Ohio's Inter-University Council (IUC), an association of the fourteen public universities in Ohio. As IUC chairman, McDavis was instrumental in developing and recommending a new funding formula for Ohio's public colleges and universities.

When students feel more involved in the university community, they want to come back. We want our students to have a good time. We want to be able to take full advantage of the academic experience. We just don't want the reputation to be a party school — we want to be the top academic school, where we also have a good time. My two favorite times of the year are Convocation, which represents newness and the start of the year, and Commencement, which represents the end. Commencement represents all we've worked for, and to know that (the students') lives will be better because of the degree they earned.

— President McDavis, The Athens Messenger, 2008

== Controversy ==
McDavis had a difficult relationship with faculty, and conflicts with students, especially with respect to arrests made in connection with student protests connected with President Trump's travel ban. The inspector general of Ohio opened an investigation into possible conflict of interest involving a local landlord/donor and the university concerning a house into which McDavis and his wife moved in 2015. A balanced review of McDavis' tenure was published in a series of several articles in the student paper The Post, which reported that, despite McDavis's claims, Ohio University had, in fact, suffered a steady and significant drop in national rankings throughout McDavis's tenure.

After his departure, it was reported that McDavis received more than $1,000,000 in deferred compensation.

== Personal life ==
One of three sons, McDavis was born to one Joseph and Mabel McDavis, and grew up in Dayton, Ohio.

He and his wife, Deborah, have two adult sons, including Ryan who specializes in Title IX. McDavis is Lutheran.
