= The Post (Ohio student newspaper) =

Ohio University student newspaper

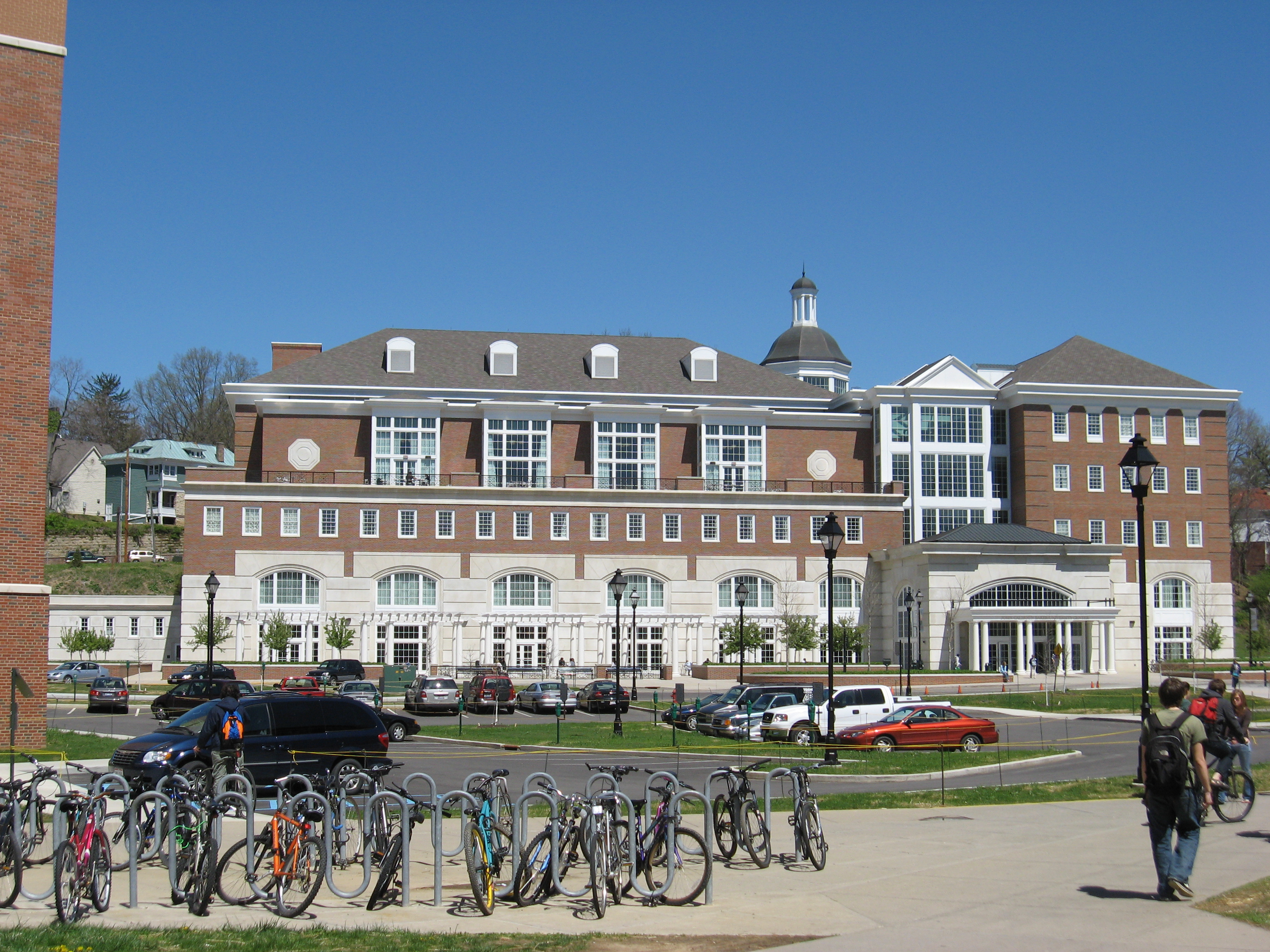
- John Calhoun Baker University Center, where the paper's newsroom is located
- Type: Student newspaper
- Format: Tabloid
- School: Ohio University
- Editor: Elizabeth Talaga
- Founded: 1911 (as The Green and White)
- Headquarters: John Calhoun Baker University Center; 1 Park Place, #325; Athens, Ohio; United States
- Circulation: 10,000 weekly
- Website: thepostathens.com

The Post is a student-run newspaper in Athens, Ohio, that covers Ohio University and Athens County. While classes at OU are in session, it publishes online every day and in print every Tuesday. Though its newsroom is located in John Calhoun Baker University Center at Ohio University, the paper is editorially independent from the university.

== History ==
The Post was launched in December 1911 as The Green and White, succeeding other student newspapers such as the Mirror, which had begun publishing in the 1800s. It was succeeded by the Post in fall 1939.

In 2015, the paper announced it would be moving to a digital-first model. This transition lowered the number of days The Post prints from five times a week to one, though content is published online daily. The paper, previously a broadsheet, was changed to a tabloid. As part of the transition, the paper underwent a redesign and rebranding, including a new logo.

== Notable alumni ==
- Andy Alexander, former ombudsman at The Washington Post and deputy bureau chief for Cox Newspapers.
- P.J. Bednarski, media reporter and editor, formerly the editor of Electronic Media and executive editor of Broadcasting & Cable; former TV critic for the Chicago Sun-Times and at USA Today when it debuted in 1982.
- Phil Elliott, politics reporter for TIME.
- Joe Eszterhas, writer best known for his work on the films Basic Instinct and Showgirls.
- Tom Hodson, former director of the E.W. Scripps School of Journalism.
- John Kaplan, a professor at the University of Florida and winner of the 1992 Pulitzer Prize for Feature Photography for his work on "Age 21 in America", a photo essay about the lives of young adults.
- Peter King, senior writer for Sports Illustrated.
- Laura Landro, columnist and former assistant managing editor at The Wall Street Journal. Contributed an article to an award-winning seven-part Wall Street Journal series in 2004.
- Wesley Lowery, reporter for The Washington Post who led the team that won the 2016 Pulitzer Prize for National Reporting for their work tracking and analyzing fatal shootings by on-duty police officers.
- Joe Mahr, reporter for the Chicago Tribune and winner of the 2004 Pulitzer Prize for Investigative Reporting for a series on the atrocities committed by Tiger Force, a U.S. Army platoon during the Vietnam War.
- Alan D. Miller, editor and interim general manager of The Columbus Dispatch.
- Nancy Nall Derringer, columnist and blogger, whose reporting on Bush administration staffer Tim Goeglein's plagiarism led to his dismissal within a 24-hour news cycle.
- Larry Neumeister, New York courts reporter for the Associated Press who covered Sonia Sotomayor's confirmation hearing and Bernard Madoff's sentencing.
- Clarence Page, syndicated columnist and senior member of the Chicago Tribune editorial board who won a Pulitzer Prize in 1989 for his commentary in the Tribune.
- Dennis Shere, author of Cain's Redemption and former publisher of the Dayton Daily News
- Alex Stuckey, reporter for The Salt Lake Tribune who won the 2017 Pulitzer Prize for Local Reporting for her contributions to a series on sexual assault at Brigham Young University.
