= Springboro Star Press =

Newspaper in Ohio

The Springboro Star Press is a newspaper based in Springboro, Ohio in the United States. Published by Miami Valley Newspapers every Wednesday, it serves Warren County and southwest Ohio.

The paper was founded by the Brown Publishing Company, which owned The Western Star, the weekly in the Warren County seat of Lebanon. The Star Press was first published on Tuesday, August 31, 1976 and covered Springboro, Hunter, and Clearcreek Township. The first editor was Stephanie Shutts-Irwin who was succeeded by Cathy nolte in 1979, and later by Jean Kowalski. In 1979, the paper expanded coverage to Franklin and Carlisle, directly competing with the Thomson Corporation's weekly Franklin Chronicle, established in 1872. While the paper's office was in Springboro, the paper was produced at the offices of The Western Star in Lebanon. A Sunday edition, called the Sunday Star Press, was established in the early 1990s in order to distribute advertising circulars.

In 1998, Brown traded the Star Press along with The Western Star, Today's Express in Morrow, the Monroe Times, and the Miamisburg-West Carrollton News to The Thomson Corporation, a Canadian newspaper company known for the poor quality of its publications, in exchange for three daily papers, the Piqua Daily Call, the Xenia Gazette, and the Greenville Daily Advocate. Nolte returned to become Publisher of the Star Press and Franklin Chronicle from 2000 to 2003. When the company decided to exit the newspaper business, Thomson sold the Star Press to Cox on September 1, 2000, though only after Thomson's original plans to sell the paper to Gannett, owner of The Cincinnati Enquirer, fell apart. Cox switched publication to Wednesday from the original Tuesday effective July 4, 2001, and ceased publication of the Sunday Star Press on June 24, 2001. Cox also moved printing of the paper from Lebanon to Hamilton, where it owned the daily Journal-News and began distributing the paper free to subscribers of its Dayton Daily News and Middletown Journal.

In August 2002, Cox announced it was closing the Star Press and a final edition was scheduled for August 28. Carl Esposito, the Cox vice president in charge of Star Press and its sister weeklies, told The Cincinnati Enquirer the papers had been losing money since Cox acquired them two years before. "We really don't want to blame it on the economy," he said. "The issue here is a very difficult decision around the fact that these publications were losing money despite our best efforts to remedy that." However, on August 23, Cox announced it was in talks with a buyer for the paper and it would continue publication until those talks concluded. A deal was reached in October for the paper to be acquired by the newly established Miller Publishing Company, which bought the paper and three other weeklies, on November 1, 2002.
