= Journal-News Pulse =

- Type: Weekly newspaper
- Owner(s): Cox Ohio Publishing
- Founded: 1960s (as the Mason Shopping Guide)
- Language: English
- Headquarters: Liberty Township, Butler County, Ohio
- City: Lebanon, Mason, and Fairfield, Ohio
- Country: United States
- Price: Free
- Sister newspapers: Journal-News, Dayton Daily News
- Website: todayspulse.com

Journal-News Pulse is a defunct weekly newspaper that was last published by Cox Media Group in Liberty Township, Butler County, Ohio, United States. It began publishing in the 1960s in Mason and was known as The Pulse-Journal for most of its history. In 2013, it merged with The Western Star of Lebanon and the Fairfield Echo of Fairfield in 2013.

== History ==
In the 1960s, Pat and Delores Diangelo began publishing the free Mason Shopping Guide out of their Mason home. The paper moved to an office in downtown Mason in the late 1960s.

In the 1970s, the paper became The Pulse and began publishing in a broadsheet format. Thomson Newspapers' Journal Publishing Company purchased the Pulse, renaming it the Mason Pulse-Journal after sister publications JournalNews of Hamilton and The Middletown Journal of Middletown. It was renamed again to the Pulse-Journal in 1977.

In the late 1990s, the paper moved to a shopping plaza south of downtown Mason. In July 2000, Cox Ohio Publishing exercised a right of first refusal against a proposed sale of the Pulse-Journal and Thomson's other southwestern Ohio publications to Gannett Company, owner of The Cincinnati Enquirer. After purchasing the papers in September of that year, Cox moved them to a consolidated office in Liberty Township.

In 2007, the paper's Mason/Deerfield edition under editor Thomas Barr and Chris Celek, Warren County editor of Cox Ohio Publishing's Southwest Group, garnered several national awards. It earned three Suburban Newspapers of America (now Local Media Association) first place honors as Non-Daily Newspaper of the Year, and also first place for Best Sports Section and for Best Headline. Also in 2007, it named PulseJournal.com Best Local Community Website. In 2006, the paper's Mason/Deerfield edition, under the same editors, was named Best Non-Daily Newspaper in the nation by Inland Press Foundation.

On January 17, 2013, the Pulse-Journal and sister weeklies The Western Star and Fairfield Echo published their final editions as separate publications. On January 17, they were replaced by Today's Pulse of Warren County, a product of The Western Star and Today's Pulse of Butler County, a product of the Fairfield Echo. The Western Star had been Ohio's second-oldest newspaper and oldest weekly newspaper, having published since 1807. Whereas the three former papers delivered on Thursdays, Today's Pulse delivered on Sundays, to compete directly with the Enquirer's Sunday edition.

On October 6, 2016, Today's Pulse's website was consolidated into the Journal-News's website.
