= Vibe (magazine) =

American music and entertainment magazine

- Cover of the April 2008 issue, featuring Janet Jackson
- Editor-in-chief: Datwon Thomas
- Former editors: Jermaine Hall; Danyel Smith; Mimi Valdes; Emil Wilbekin; Alan Light; Jonathan Van Meter
- Total circulation (2006): 858,469
- Founded: September 1993; 32 years ago
- Final issue: 2014 (print)
- Company: Eldridge Industries
- Country: United States
- Based in: New York City, New York
- Language: English
- Website: www.vibe.com
- ISSN: 1070-4701

Vibe is an American music and entertainment magazine founded by producers David Salzman and Quincy Jones. The publication predominantly features R&B and hip hop music artists, actors and other entertainers. After shutting down production in the summer of 2009, it was purchased by the private equity investment fund InterMedia Partners, then issued bi-monthly with double covers and a larger online presence. The magazine's target demographic is predominantly young, urban followers of hip hop culture. In 2014, the magazine discontinued its print version.

The magazine features a broader range of interests than its closest competitors The Source and XXL, which focus more narrowly on rap music, or the rock- and pop-centric Rolling Stone and Spin. The May 1998 Vibe article "Racer X" by Ken Li is credited as the basis for the 2001 film The Fast and the Furious and the resulting franchise.

== Publication history ==
Quincy Jones launched Vibe in 1993, in partnership with Time Inc. Originally, the publication was called Volume before co-founding editor, Scott Poulson-Bryant named it Vibe. Vibe was initially "founded with a test issue in 1992 by Time Warner." [4] Though hip hop mogul Russell Simmons was rumored to be an initial partner, publisher Len Burnett revealed in a March 2007 interview that Simmons clashed with editor-in-chief Jonathan Van Meter. In May 1994, Meter resigned after Jones prevented the publication of the June/July 1994 issue featuring Madonna on Dennis Rodman on the cover. Meter's successors were Alan Light, Danyel Smith, Emil Wilbekin, Mimi Valdes, and finally Danyel Smith again.

Miller Publishing purchased Vibe in 1996, and shortly afterward bought Spin. A private equity firm, Wicks Group, bought the magazine in 2006. On June 30, 2009, it was announced that Vibe was ceasing publication immediately, although according to Essence, Quincy Jones stated he would like to keep it alive online.

After shutting down, private equity investment fund InterMedia Partners bought Vibe magazine. They added Uptown magazine to Vibe's parent company, Vibe Holdings. Ronald Burkle and Magic Johnson later invested in the company. Vibe Holdings merged with BlackBook Media to form Vibe Media in 2012.

On April 25, 2013 it was announced that Vibe magazine along with vibe.com and vibevixen.com had been sold to Spin Media for an undisclosed sum. Spin Media was thought likely to shut down Vibe's print magazine by the end of 2013, which a representative stating: "We're still trying to find a print model that makes economic sense in the digital age." Instead, they cut the magazine's frequency to quarterly. In 2014, the magazine discontinued its print version.

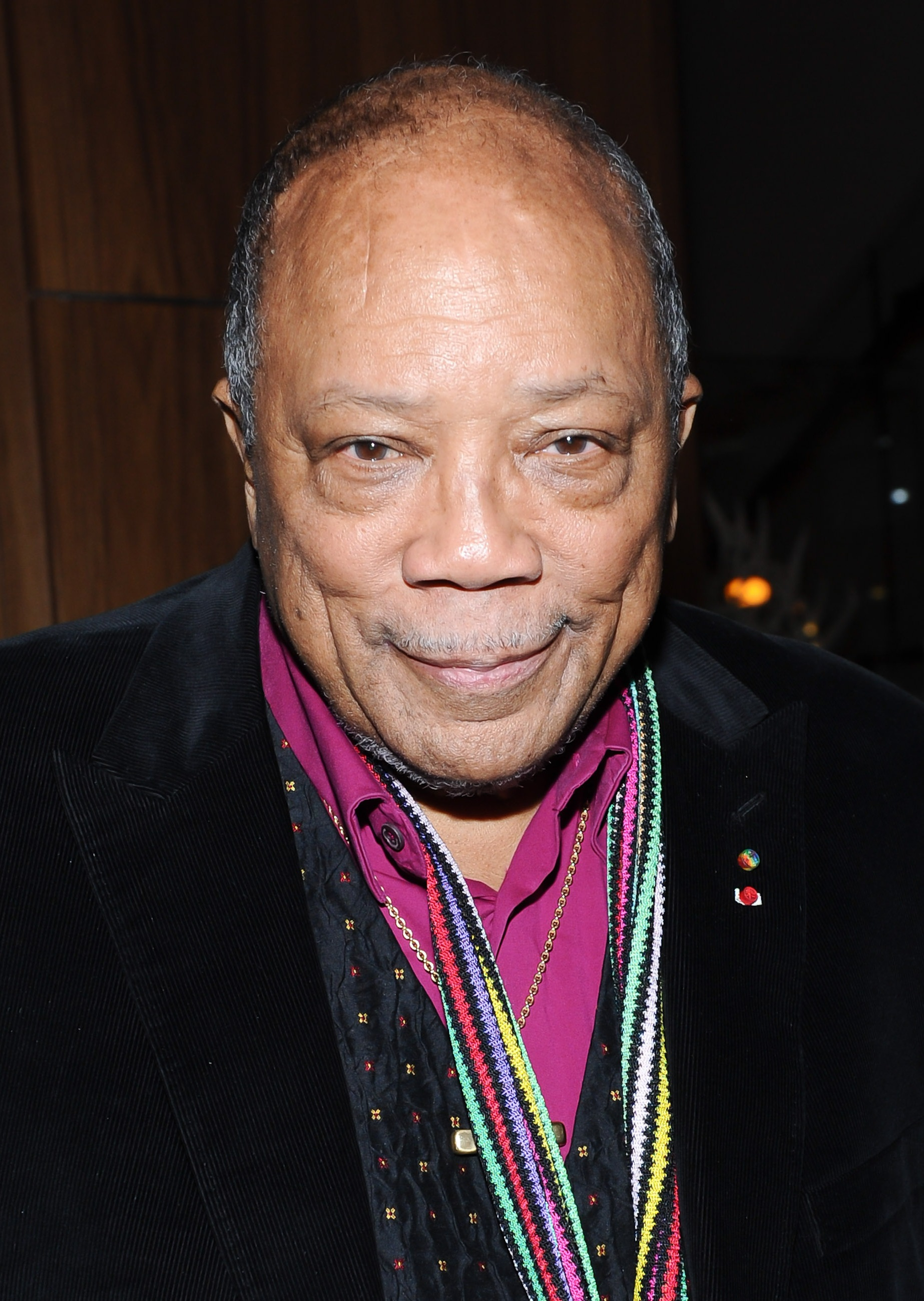
Founder of Vibe, Quincy Jones

In December 2016, Eldridge Industries acquired SpinMedia via the Hollywood Reporter-Billboard Media Group for an undisclosed amount.

== Covers ==
Vibe magazine was known for the creative direction of their covers. R&B singer Mary J. Blige repeatedly was on the cover of Vibe with countless articles following her career. The trio TLC was photographed for the cover in firefighters' gear, referencing the fact that member Lisa Lopes burned down the house of then-boyfriend and NFL star Andre Rison. The first non-photograph cover of Vibe was an illustration of late singer Aaliyah by well-known artist/illustrator Alvaro; this was Aaliyah's first appearance on the cover as well. Other famous cover subjects are Trey Songz, Brandy, Snoop Dogg, Mariah Carey, Beyoncé, Amerie, Jennifer Lopez, Keyshia Cole, Janet Jackson, Lil Wayne, The Fugees, Eminem, T.I., R. Kelly, Whitney Houston, Michael Jackson (whom Quincy Jones' daughter Kidada had dressed in hip hop clothing, reportedly for the first and only time in the entertainer's career), Ciara, who also appeared on the cover numerous times and rap legend Tupac Shakur's famous cover story in which he reveals important details about his non-fatal 1994 NYC shooting (two years before his death in Las Vegas, Nevada). Electro-rapper Kesha became the first white female artist to appear on the cover as a solo act in October 2012.

== Content ==
Featured segments included the back page list "20 Questions"', the Boomshots column about reggae and Caribbean music by Rob Kenner; "Revolutions" music reviews; "Vibe Confidential", a celebrity gossip column; and "Next", which profiled up-and-coming artists. The magazine also devoted several pages to photo spreads displaying high-end designer clothing as well as sportswear by urban labels such as Rocawear and Fubu.

Vibe made a consistent effort to feature models of all ethnicities in these pages. Former editor Emil Wilbikin was frequently credited with styling those pages and keeping fashion in the forefront of the magazine's identity during the early 2000s. Many clothing brands created or linked to hip hop celebrities, such as Sean Combs' Sean John, Nelly's Apple Bottoms, and G-Unit by 50 Cent found plenty of exposure in Vibe's pages.

In the September 2003 issue commemorating ten years of publication, the magazine created different covers using black and white portraits of its most popular cover subjects. It also contained "The Vibe 100: The Juiciest People, Places and Things of the Year".

Many successful writers and editors contributed to the publication, including Alan Light, Jeff Chang, Dream Hampton, Cheo Hodari Coker, Kevin Powell, Erica Kennedy, Sacha Jenkins, Noah Callahan-Bever and Miles Marshall Lewis. Mark Shaw was the magazine's art director.

== Expanding the brand ==
In addition to the magazine, Vibe also publishes books on hip hop culture. To celebrate the magazine's tenth anniversary, it published VX: Ten Years of Vibe Photography, which featured a bare-chested 50 Cent on the cover. The volume also includes photos of Alicia Keys, RZA from the Wu-Tang Clan, Eve, Chuck D of Public Enemy, and Run-D.M.C. Works by prominent photographers Albert Watson, Ellen von Unwerth, David LaChapelle, and Sante D'Orazio are among the 150 photographs in the hardcover edition.

Other books published under the Vibe banner cover the history of hip hop, the women of hip hop, and rappers Tupac Shakur and The Notorious B.I.G. Additionally, the magazine published a spin-off publication, Vibe Vixen, from 2004 to 2007. Aimed at Vibe's female multicultural demographic, Vibe Vixen included features on beauty, fashion, and female entertainers. R&B starlet Ciara appeared on the inaugural issue's cover.

Spencer was fired in October 1997 and replaced by comedian Sinbad, along with Big Boy as the in-house announcer. As was common practice for late-night talk shows (established by Johnny Carson and Merv Griffin), it had a live band, led by keyboardist Greg Phillinganes; Jones worked with him during productions for Michael Jackson's albums Thriller and Off The Wall. The program aired in first-run syndication until the summer of 1998, when it was canceled. The show was taped at CBS Television City in Los Angeles.

Other platforms featuring the Vibe brand are Vibe Online, the magazine's online presence; Vibe On Demand, an on-demand network; VLN TV, an online video channel; Vibe Film; MVibe, a wireless content provider for hand-held devices as well as CD and DVD lines distributed under the same name; and The Vibe Music Mixer, is available for iPhone and iPad.

In May 2015, Vibe expanded its brand by adding the digital extension, Vibe Viva. Vibe Viva is a space where Latinos can explore their rich history, and see what is driving Latin culture.

In October 2019 Vibe co-hosted Billboard's 2019 Hip Hop Power Players event in NYC.

== Vibe Awards ==
Beginning in 2003, Vibe produced and aired its annual awards show on UPN through 2006, and VH1 Soul in 2007.

An incident occurred at the 2004 Vibe Awards taping at the Santa Monica Airport hangar, in which G-Unit rapper Young Buck stabbed 26-year-old Los Angeles native, Jimmy James Johnson after Johnson approached Dr. Dre under the pretense of asking for an autograph, and then assaulted him. Young Buck later pleaded no contest to a charge of "assault likely to produce great bodily harm," and was sentenced to three years' probation and 80 hours of community service.

== Other editions ==
Vibe Vixen was a magazine geared towards female readers of Vibe magazine that covered beauty, dating, entertainment, fashion, and societal issues for "urban minded females". The magazine was initially released in fall of 2004, and sales were considered successful enough for the magazine to be issued on a quarterly basis. Vibe Vixen folded after its August/September 2007 issue due to low circulation. Stars featured on Vibe Vixen's covers included Ciara, Tracee Ellis Ross, Kimora Lee Simmons, Kelis, Lauren London, LaLa Anthony and Tia Mowry.
