= Dayton Daily News =

Newspaper in Dayton, Ohio

- Trusted since 1898

- Front page on March 3, 2019
- Type: Daily newspaper
- Format: Broadsheet
- Owner: Cox Enterprises
- Publisher: Suzanne Klopfenstein
- Editor: Ashley Bethard
- Founded: 1898; 128 years ago
- Headquarters: 601 E. Third St. Dayton, Ohio 45402; USA
- ISSN: 0897-0920
- OCLC number: 232118157
- Website: www.daytondailynews.com

The Dayton Daily News (DDN) is a daily newspaper published in Dayton, Ohio. It is owned by Cox Enterprises, Inc., a privately held global conglomerate headquartered in Atlanta, Georgia, United States. Its major operating subsidiaries are Cox Communications, Cox Automotive, and Ohio Newspapers (including the Dayton Daily News, Springfield News-Sun and the Journal-News papers).

== Headquarters ==
The Dayton Daily News has its headquarters in the Manhattan Building in downtown Dayton, 601 E. Third St. The newspaper's editorial and business offices were moved there in January, 2022. For more than 100 years the paper's editorial offices and printing presses were located in downtown Dayton. From 1999 to 2017, the paper was printed at the Print Technology Center near Interstate 75 in Franklin about 15 minutes to the south. In 2017, the Dayton Daily News's parent company came to an agreement with Gannett for the paper to be printed at Gannett's facility in Indianapolis. This resulted in the closure of the Franklin facility.

Ohio Newspapers also publishes two other daily newspapers and websites in Southwest Ohio: Journal-News (formerly The Middletown Journal and Hamilton JournalNews) and the Springfield News-Sun. Cox First Media also publishes weekly papers Today's Pulse and Oxford Press, and had published several other weekly papers until CMG Ohio ceased their operations in January 2013, including The Western Star (Ohio), formerly the oldest weekly paper published in the state, the Pulse-Journal (Mason-Deerfield Township and West Chester-Liberty Township editions) and the Fairfield Echo.

== Merger ==
In late 2010, Cox Enterprises merged all of its local media holdings under the CMG Ohio brand and consolidated locations to The Media Center. In early 2020, the private equity firm Apollo Global Management purchased Cox Enterprises' radio and TV properties and all Cox Media Group Ohio media entities. In March 2020, Cox Enterprises took back ownership of Ohio Newspapers, which included the Dayton Daily News, Journal-News, Springfield News-Sun, Dayton.com, and related digital brands. As a group they operate under the brand Cox First Media.

== History ==
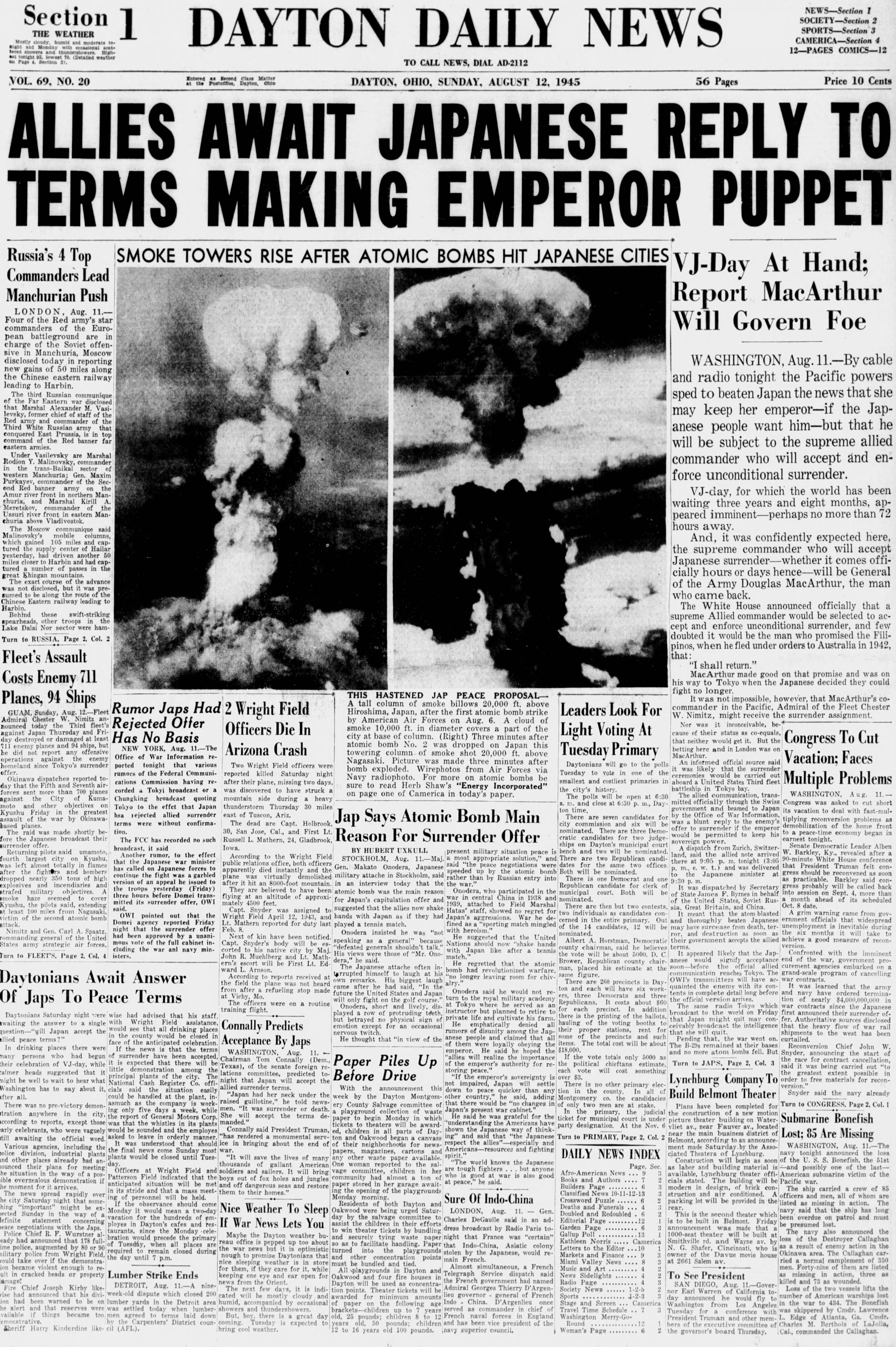
Front page on August 12, 1945, announcing the atomic bombing of Hiroshima and Nagasaki, Japan

On August 15, 1898, James M. Cox purchased the Dayton Evening News. One week later, on August 22, 1898, he renamed it the Dayton Daily News. In 2023, the Dayton Daily News celebrated 125 years in business.

The paper was founded with the intention of pioneering a new type of journalism, keeping weak ties to politicians and advertisers while seeking objectivity and public advocacy as primary functions. These goals pushed the paper in the direction of valuing the public interest.

A Sunday edition was launched on November 2, 1913. In 1948, Cox purchased two morning papers, The Journal and The Herald, from the Herrick-Kumler Company. The next year he combined them to form The Journal-Herald.

For the next four decades, The Journal-Herald was the conservative morning paper, and the Dayton Daily News (which had a larger circulation) was the liberal evening paper. The papers operated newsrooms on separate floors of the same building in downtown Dayton. On September 15, 1986, The Journal-Herald and the Daily News were merged to become a morning paper, the Dayton Daily News and Journal-Herald, with both names appearing on the front page. The Journal-Herald name last appeared on the paper's front-page flag on December 31, 1987.

Cox was the Democratic Party's candidate for U.S. President in the election of 1920, and the city of Dayton has voted for the Democratic candidate in presidential elections ever since. Cox's running mate for vice president was Franklin Delano Roosevelt, who was elected president in 1932.

== Recent operations ==
The paper was led by Jeff Bruce as editor from 1998 to 2008. Bruce replaced Max Jennings, who retired. When Bruce retired in 2007 Kevin Riley, 44, a graduate of the University of Dayton, was named editor. Riley spent most of his career with the paper, starting as a copy editor and later serving as sports editor, Internet general manager, and publisher of the Springfield News-Sun in Springfield, Ohio. He was promoted from deputy editor.

In 2010, Riley was named editor of the Atlanta Journal-Constitution and that paper's editor, Julia Wallace, under whose leadership the AJC won Pulitzer Prizes in 2006 and 2007, moved to Dayton to become Senior Vice President of news and programming for CMG Ohio heading a new combined newspaper, television and radio newsroom. She was soon after named the first female publisher and retired in 2016. In 2011, Jana Collier was promoted from managing editor to editor-in-chief of CMG Ohio and was responsible for content and operations for all daily and weekly papers. Collier is also the first woman to be editor-in-chief of the Dayton Cox newspaper organization. In March 2020, Jana Collier was named publisher of the newly formed Ohio Newspapers brand. Upon her retirement at the end of 2022, Suzanne Klopfenstein was named the new publisher and assumed her role in the beginning of 2023. Klopfenstein has 30 years of media experience, including serving as the senior director of sales for Cox First Media. Ashley Bethard became editor and chief content officer in January, 2022.

On March 5, 2023, the newspaper announced that, due to cost issues, starting on May 6, it would no longer produce printed newspapers on Saturdays. Digital products, including its online newspaper (branded as ePaper which is available online or in the company's app), would continue to be published on Saturdays .

== Notable employees ==
In 1998, reporters Russell Carollo and Jeff Nesmith won the Pulitzer Prize for their reporting on dangerous flaws and mismanagement in the military health care system, a series very relevant to its readership because of the presence of Wright-Patterson Air Force Base in neighboring Greene County.

The paper is the home of cartoonist Mike Peters, who draws the Mother Goose and Grimm strip and won the Pulitzer Prize for Editorial Cartooning in 1981, and columnist Dale Huffman, who had written a daily metro column every day for more than eight years before beginning a hiatus on January 30, 2008, after he was diagnosed with kidney cancer.

The following people at some point worked at or wrote for the Dayton Daily News:

- Erma Bombeck (at The Journal-Herald)
- Millie Bingham
- Si Burick
- Ritter Collett (at The Journal-Herald)
- Charlotte Reeve Conover
- James M. Cox
- Bob Englehart (at The Journal-Herald)
- Clem Hamilton
- Ann Heller
- Marj Heyduck (at The Journal-Herald)
- Dale Huffman
- Hal McCoy
- Jeff Nesmith
- Mike Peters
- Tom Archdeacon
- John Scalzi
- Myron Scott
- Jon Talton
- Jim Zofkie
- Charley Stough III
- Dann Stupp
- Clara Weisenborn (at The Journal-Herald)
- Roz Young (also at The Journal-Herald)

In 1988, Daily News publisher Dennis Shere was fired by Cox Newspapers because he rejected a health lecture advertisement by homosexual groups. Shere cited his "Christian perspective" in declining to print the ad. The Southern Baptist Convention subsequently passed a resolution calling on "all media to refuse advertising that promotes homosexuality or any other lifestyle that is destructive to the family". The resolution said Shere was fired for his "commitment to defend traditional moral and family values". The company responded that it was defending freedom of expression for all people, saying "We cannot compromise on the constitutional issue of equal access to the press".
