= Miller Publishing =

Miller Publishing may refer to:

- Miller Music Publishing Co., former United States music publisher founded 1906, later absorbed by MGM
- Miller Publishing Company, United States newspaper publisher founded 2002

== See also ==
- Millar Publishing Company, a publisher of comics, see Pete Millar (cartoonist)
