= Clarence Page =

American journalist (born 1947)

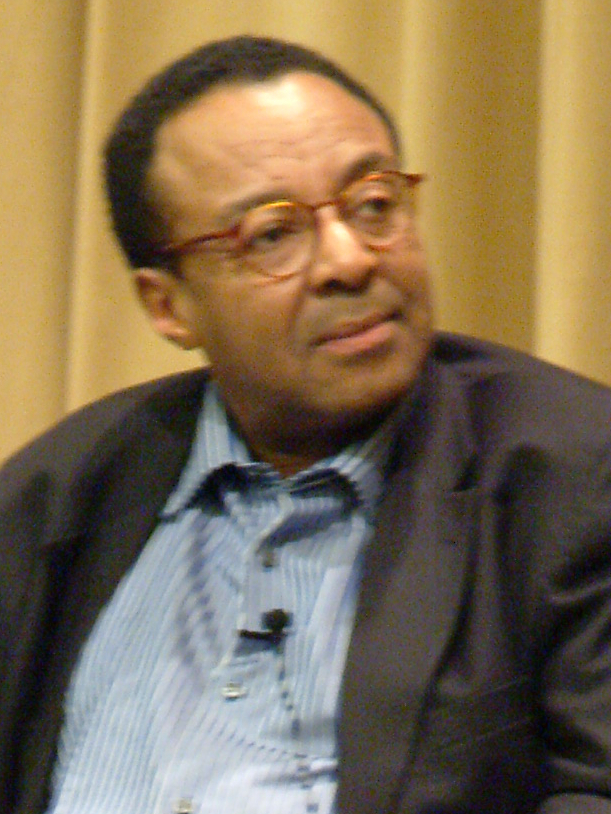
- Page in 2007
- Born: June 2, 1947 (age 78); Dayton, Ohio, U.S.
- Education: Ohio University
- Occupation: Journalist
- Notable credit(s): Chicago Tribune; The Cincinnati Enquirer; The Middletown Journal
- Spouse(s): Leanita McClain (divorced); Lisa Johnson (1987–present)
- Children: 1

Clarence Page (born June 2, 1947) is an American journalist, syndicated columnist, and senior member of the Chicago Tribune editorial board.

== Early years ==
Page was born in Dayton, Ohio, and attended Middletown High School in Middletown where he worked on the school's bi-weekly newspaper. After graduating in 1965, he worked freelance as a writer and photographer for The Middletown Journal and The Cincinnati Enquirer, while he earned his Bachelor of Science degree in journalism from Ohio University.

== Career ==
After his graduation from university in 1969, Page took a position with The Chicago Tribune, and was drafted into the military after only six months with the paper. He found himself assigned as an Army journalist with the 212th Artillery Group at Fort Lewis, Washington, when his obligation ended and he made his way back to the Tribune in 1971.

Page was a frequent panelist on The McLaughlin Group, a regular contributor of essays to The PBS NewsHour, host of several documentaries on the Public Broadcasting Service, and is an occasional commentator on National Public Radio's Weekend Edition Sunday. Page often appears as a political analyst on the Hardball with Chris Matthews on MSNBC. He also appeared in the 1993 film Rising Sun, playing himself as a talk show panel member. Page's achievements came despite an undiagnosed case of ADD, the effects of which he recounts in a chapter in Positively ADD.

Clarence Page wrote an editorial piece about "Richie" Daley and his achievements as mayor of Chicago.

== Personal life ==
Page was married to and later divorced from Leanita McClain, a Tribune columnist who also focused on race. In 1987 Page married Lisa Johnson with whom he has one son, Grady Jonathan.

== Honors and awards ==
Page has received honoris causa doctorates from Columbia College Chicago, Lake Forest College, and Nazareth College in Rochester, New York.

- 1972 Pulitzer Prize for a Chicago Tribune Task Force series on voter fraud
- 1976 Edward Scott Beck Award for overseas reporting on the changing politics of Southern Africa
- 1980 Illinois UPI Award for community service for The Black Tax
- 1987 American Civil Liberties Union James P. McGuire Award for columns on constitutional rights
- 1989 Pulitzer Prize for Commentary

== Bibliography ==
- Page, Clarence (1996). Showing My Color: Impolite Essays on Race and Identity. New York: HarperCollins. ISBN 0-06-017256-8.
- Page, Clarence (2000). A Bridge to the New Media Century. Ithaca, NY: Ithaca College. OCLC 55010879.
