= William H. P. Denny =

American politician

William H. P. Denny (June 3, 1811 – September 29, 1890) was an American newspaper editor and publisher, and politician, in Ohio.

William was the son of George Denny (died September 22, 1823) and Sarah Higgins (died September 22, 1823), both of whom died on the evening of the same day. George Denny worked as a printer on the same newspaper where William was serving as an apprentice - The Western Star in Lebanon, Ohio. From circa 1830, William was a partner in the paper and later owned it outright until 1858. Denny then went to Dayton, Ohio, as publisher of the Dayton Daily and Weekly Gazette.

He then moved to Circleville, Ohio, where he founded the Union and then bought the Wilmington Journal in Wilmington, Ohio. In 1877, he returned to Lebanon where he founded The Lebanon Gazette, selling out by 1880 when he moved to Georgetown, Ohio and founded the Georgetown Gazette. He served as a senator in the 41st and 42nd General Assemblies in 1842 and 1843.

William was married to Orpha Brown (died March 1876), and they had several children. William and Orpha are both buried in the Lebanon Cemetery in Lebanon, Warren County, Ohio (Old Section). William was buried in Lot 180-3 on October 2, 1890, and Orpha was buried in Lot 180-4 on March 18, 1876. William's grave is not marked with a gravestone.
