= The Lebanon Patriot =

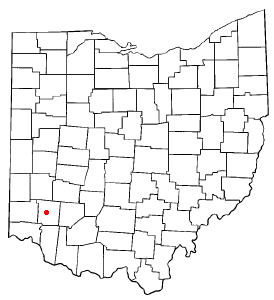
Location of Lebanon

The Lebanon Patriot, now defunct, was an American newspaper published weekly at Lebanon, Ohio, the seat of Warren County. The paper was founded by General Durbin Ward as a Democratic paper and first published on January 16, 1868. Warren County being ardently Republican, the paper was to take the place of the previous Democratic paper in the county, the Democratic Citizen, which was destroyed by a mob at the outbreak of the Civil War. Ward sold the paper to Edward Warwick who sold it to A. A. Roland (born February 11, 1853) in April 1878. Circa 1883 it was owned and edited by Mary V. Proctor Wilson. The paper was last issued in December 1936 when it merged with The Western Star, another weekly in Lebanon. The combined paper was published as The Western Star and Lebanon Patriot from January 7, 1937, to June 30, 1938.
