= Durbin Ward =

American politician

Jesse Durbin Ward
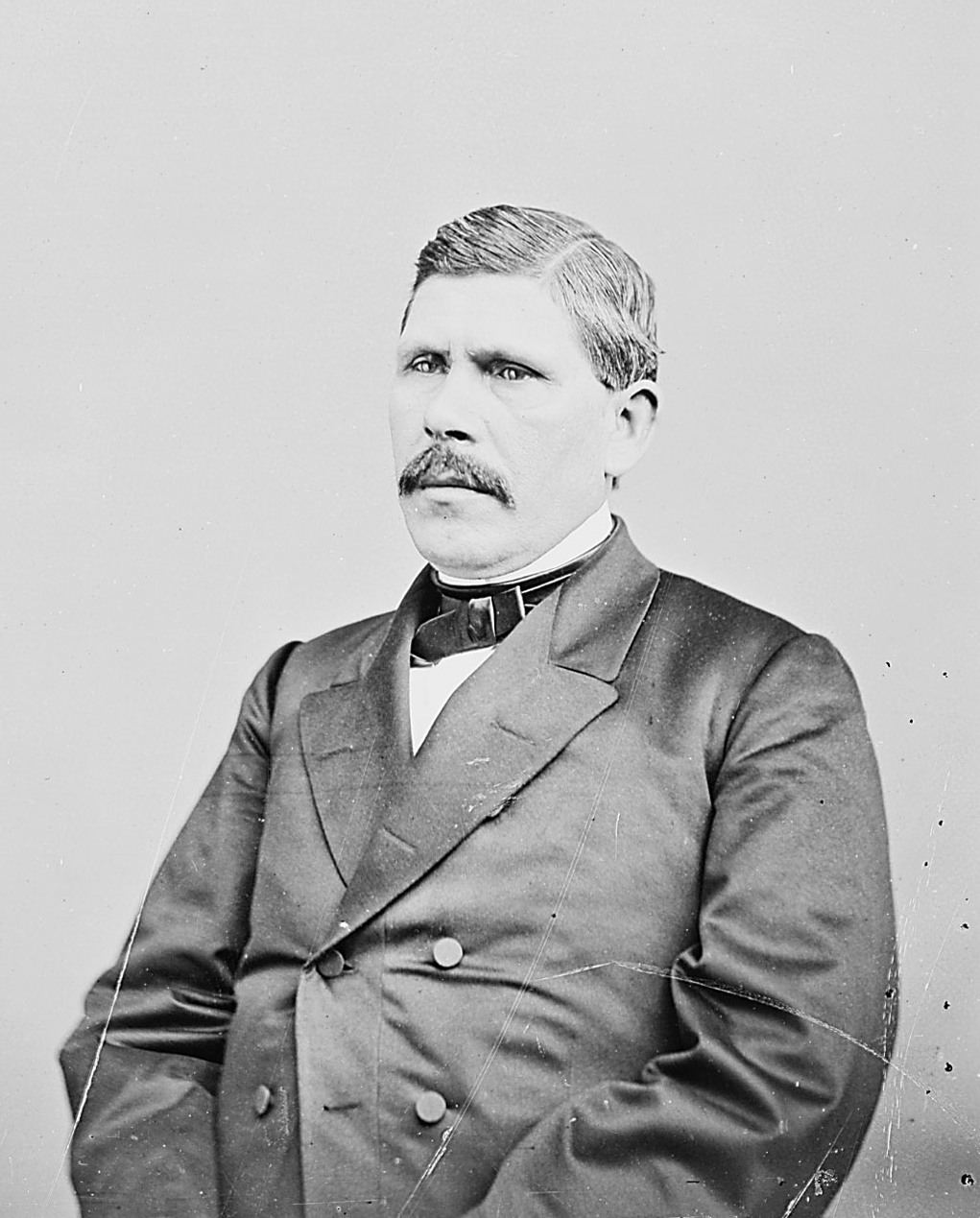
- Born: February 11, 1819; Augusta, Kentucky, U.S.
- Died: May 22, 1886 (aged 67); Lebanon, Ohio, U.S.
- Military career
- Allegiance: United States; Union
- Branch: United States Army; Union Army
- Rank: Colonel; Brevet Brigadier General
- Conflicts: American Civil War

Jesse Durbin Ward (February 11, 1819 – May 22, 1886) was an Ohio lawyer, politician, newspaper publisher, and American Civil War officer.

== Early life and career ==
Ward was born in Augusta, Kentucky. His mother, Rebecca Patterson, named him in honor of the Rev. John Price Durbin (1800–1876), a noted Methodist preacher, who was a school mate of hers.

Around 1823, the family moved to Fayette County, Indiana, in the southeastern part of that state. Josiah Morrow, the historian of Warren County, wrote of Ward:

His early opportunities for education were limited, but such was his thirst for knowledge that he became an insatiable reader, and, when he was eighteen years old he had read every book he had ever seen. He has never lost his studious habits, and when at home he is most frequently found in his library . . . .

He attended for two years Miami University in Oxford, Ohio, one county east of Fayette and across the state line, then taught school in Warren County and settled there. He studied law under Judge George J. Smith (1799–1878) and Thomas Corwin, a Lebanon attorney who later was Governor of Ohio. After he was admitted to practice, he was Corwin's law partner.

In 1845, Ward, a Whig, was elected Warren County's seventh Prosecuting Attorney, an office once held by Governor Corwin. He served from 1846 to 1850. From 1853 to 1854, he represented Warren County in the Fiftieth General Assembly, the first held under the new state constitution adopted in 1851. He served only one two-year term in the legislature. During that time, he sponsored legislation for the state to abandon the unprofitable Warren County Canal that connected Lebanon to the Miami and Erie Canal at Middletown.

Upon his retirement from the legislature, he opened a law office in Cincinnati, Ohio, but continued to live at Lebanon. Ward switched to the Democratic Party about this time and was its nominee for Congress in 1856 and Attorney General in 1858. (He lost the latter to Republican Christopher Wolcott.) In 1860, he supported Illinois Senator Stephen A. Douglas for president.

== Civil War ==
When President Abraham Lincoln called for volunteers to fight in the Civil War, Ward was the first in his congressional district to enlist. He entered the army as a private, declining a commission. He rose to be a major in the 17th Ohio Volunteer Infantry and saw action at Mill Springs, Corinth, Stones River, Hoover's Gap, and Chickamauga. At Chickamauga, his left arm was wounded and permanently crippled. Ward was appointed colonel of the 17th Ohio Volunteer Infantry on March 1, 1864. He resigned his commission on November 8, 1864.

On January 13, 1866 President Andrew Johnson nominated Ward for appointment to the grade of brevet brigadier general, to rank from October 18, 1865, for his "gallant and meritorious conduct at the battle of Chickamauga," and the United States Senate confirmed the appointment on March 12, 1866.

== Postbellum career ==
After the war ended, President Andrew Johnson named him United States Attorney for the Southern District of Ohio. In 1870, he was elected a senator in the Ohio General Assembly.

At Lebanon, Ward founded The Lebanon Patriot, a Democratic paper first published on January 16, 1868. Warren County being ardently Republican, the paper was to take the place of the previous Democratic paper in the county, the Democratic Citizen, which was destroyed by a mob at the outbreak of the Civil War. Ward sold the paper to Edward Warwick in the 1870s.

In 1883, Ward was president of the Ohio State Bar Association.

== Death ==
Jesse Durbin Ward died at Lebanon, Ohio on May 22, 1886. He was buried at Lebanon Cemetery, Lebanon, Ohio.

== See also ==
- List of American Civil War brevet generals (Union)

== Notes ==
Legal offices
Preceded by Richard A. Harrison	President of the Ohio State Bar Association; 1883	Succeeded by Asa W. Jones
