= Ohio University Women's Center =

The Ohio University Women's Center is part of the Office of Diversity, Access and Equity at Ohio University in Athens, Ohio. The Women's Center opened in February 2007 with the opening of the university's John Calhoun Baker University Center. The Women's Center was to advocate for women, gender, and diversity.

== Staff ==
The Women's Center has two full-time employees. Each year, the center hires several undergraduate students, including work study and PACE positions. The center also hires graduate assistants and practicum students and has a volunteer program.

== Programming ==
Love Your Body Day is a national campaign about positive body image. The Women's Center has participated since 2008. The Center holds a symposium in the evening featuring different speakers followed by an indulgence party, where attendees bring a favorite dish to share.

International Women's Day is a festival that is celebrated nationally every year on the Sunday closest to March 8. The Women's Center began participating in International Women's Day in 2009.
