= Miller Publishing Company =

Publishing company that owns four local newspapers in southwestern Ohio

The Miller Publishing Company was founded by siblings Donald Miller and Donna (Miller) Reddington in 2002 to purchase four small weekly newspapers in southwestern Ohio from Cox Communications. Two of the papers are in Warren County, the Franklin Chronicle in Franklin and the Star-Press in Springboro. The other two papers are in Montgomery County, the Miamisburg-West Carrollton News in Miamisburg and the Germantown Press in Germantown. The company's headquarters are in Miamisburg.

The four papers had been owned by the Canadian newspaper giant Thomson. Thomson had acquired the Chronicle in 1976 and the Star Press and News in 1998 from the Brown Publishing Company, the company founded by Clarence J. Brown. When Thomson decided to exit the newspaper business in 2000, the papers were sold to Cox Communications, along with ten other papers, including the daily Middletown Journal and Ohio's oldest weekly, The Western Star, effective September 2, 2000. In August 2002, Cox announced it would sell the Germantown and Miamisburg papers and shutter the Franklin and Springboro papers, which were established in 1872 and 1976, respectively. However, Cox sold all four papers to the newly formed Miller Publishing Company on November 1, 2002. Donald Miller was a former executive of Brown Publishing.

The company struggled with the purchase and filed for bankruptcy protection January 16, 2004.

Miller Publishing currently does not have a web presence for any of its papers.
