= Journal-News =

Ohio, United States newspaper

- Front page of March 3, 2019
- Type: Daily newspaper
- Owner(s): Cox Enterprises
- Publisher: Suzanne Klopfenstein
- Editor: Ben McLaughlin
- Founded: 2013
- Language: English
- Headquarters: Hamilton, Butler County, Ohio
- City: Hamilton and Middletown, Ohio
- Country: United States
- Sister newspapers: Dayton Daily News
- Website: www.journal-news.com

The Journal-News is a daily newspaper published by Cox Enterprises in Liberty Township, Butler County, Ohio, United States. It formed in 2013 from the merger of the Hamilton JournalNews in Hamilton and The Middletown Journal in Middletown. Journal-News is a full-size daily newspaper with minimal coverage of Cincinnati and Dayton. It shares staff and resources with its sister publication, the Dayton Daily News and competes with The Cincinnati Enquirer.

From 2013 to 2016, the Journal-News was combined with Journal-News Pulse (formerly Today's Pulse, which itself was the result of merged editions of weekly newspapers from neighboring Warren County.) The Pulse was then folded into the Journal-News.

On March 5, 2023, the newspaper announced that, due to cost issues, starting on May 6, it would no longer produce printed newspapers on Saturdays. Digital products, including its online newspaper (branded as ePaper which is available online or in the newspaper's app), would continue to be published on Saturdays.
