= William C. McClintock =

American journalist

William C. McClintock (born April 21, 1845, date of death unknown) was an American newspaper editor and publisher who owned The Western Star in Lebanon, Ohio.

== Biography ==
McClintock was born in Newark, New Jersey, the fifth of the nine children of William and Eliza (Eccles) McClintock. He grew up in Bridgeport, Connecticut, and came to Cincinnati, Ohio, in 1867 to work on the Phonetic Journal and the Cincinnati Daily Gazette. On January 19, 1871, he became co-owner of The Western Star and sole-owner on January 16, 1873. He introduced steam presses to the paper's operations. On September 7, 1871, he married Emma B. Egbert.
