= Leanita McClain =

American journalist (1951–1984)

- Born: October 3, 1951; Chicago, Illinois, U.S.
- Died: May 29, 1984 (aged 32); Chicago, Illinois, US
- Occupation: Journalist
- Years active: 1973–1984

Leanita McClain (October 3, 1951 – May 29, 1984) was an American journalist and commentator, best known for her observations of race and politics in Chicago and the U.S. in the early 1980s. Her writings in the Chicago Tribune and in opinion pieces published in Newsweek gave broad exposure to her thoughts on race and class in the United States. Her work addressed both local topics, such as the election of Harold Washington as mayor in 1983, as well as topics of more national interest, including the challenges facing the growing black middle class.

== Life and career ==
McClain was born in Chicago in 1951, and grew up in the Ida B. Wells housing projects. She graduated from Chicago State University and the Medill School of Journalism. Upon graduating, McClain joined the staff of the Chicago Tribune in 1973 and the editorial board in 1983. In fact, McClain was the first African American to serve on the Chicago Tribune's editorial board, and the youngest, at age 32. In 1984, Glamour magazine named McClain one of the top 10 career women in the United States. She was married briefly to fellow journalist Clarence Page.

A posthumous collection of her essays, edited by Clarence Page, was published in 1986.

McClain suffered from depression through much of her life, and died by suicide in Chicago in 1984.
