= The Lebanon Gazette =

Newspaper in Lebanon, Ohio, USA

The Lebanon Gazette, now defunct, was the name of two weekly newspapers published in Lebanon, Ohio, both of which were absorbed by The Western Star.

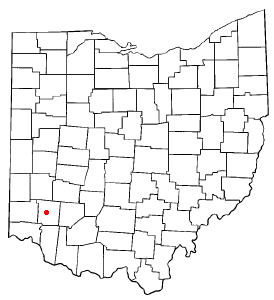
Location of Lebanon

The first of the papers was initially issued on Wednesday, November 11, 1821, and it ceased publication Saturday, August 10, 1822. The Western Star was then retitled The Western Star and Lebanon Gazette.

The second paper to bear this name was established by William H. P. Denny, the former owner of The Western Star, in 1877. In 1879, he sold the paper to William D. Mulford and J. C. Van Harlingen. By 1882, the Gazette Printing Company, a company controlled by George M. Johnston, assumed ownership. The paper was discontinued February 16, 1893, and with The Western Star's issue of Thursday, February 23, 1893, that journal was called The Western Star and Lebanon Gazette.
