= Fairfield Echo =

- Type: Weekly newspaper
- Format: Broadsheet
- Owner: Cox Media Group (Cox Enterprises)
- Founder(s): Tom and Dorothy Logsdon
- Founded: September 7, 1956
- Ceased publication: January 2013
- Language: English
- Headquarters: Fairfield, Ohio
- Sister newspapers: The Western Star; Pulse-Journal

The Fairfield Echo was a weekly broadsheet newspaper published in Fairfield, Ohio, from 1956 until January 2013. It covered the city of Fairfield and Fairfield Township in Butler County. In its later years it was owned by Cox Media Group, a subsidiary of Cox Enterprises, which closed it in early 2013.

== History ==
The Echo was established on September 7, 1956, nearly a year after Fairfield became a city in October 1955. According to the Library of Congress catalogue record, the paper appeared under the title Fairfield-Hamilton Echo from January 2 to June 5, 1959, and as Echo from June 29, 1977, to June 21, 1978, before returning to its original name.

For most of its history the paper served Fairfield as a local newspaper with its own staff and editions. By 2012 it was one of several weekly titles in the Cincinnati market that Cox Media Group operated alongside its daily newspapers.

== Closure ==
On December 6, 2012, the Springboro Sun reported that, as of January 20, 2013, The Western Star of Lebanon, Ohio, the Pulse-Journal of Mason, Ohio, and the Fairfield Echo would be closed, according to Terry Bouquot, Cox Media Group's senior director of business operations for the Cincinnati market.

The company said it will replace them with two free publications, Today's Pulse of Butler County and Today's Pulse of Warren County, distributed on Sundays. Bouquot said the change followed market research which showed that residents wanted local news targeted to their own area.

The closure was part of a wider consolidation of Cox's Ohio weekly newspapers. The Western Star, first published on February 13, 1807, and described at the time as the oldest weekly newspaper in Ohio, ended in the same consolidation.
