= Dennis Shere =

American author, journalist and lawyer

Dennis Shere is an American author, journalist and lawyer. Shere has written two books: Cain's Redemption, a biography about Warden Burl Cain of the Louisiana State Penitentiary at Angola, and The Last Meal — Defending an Accused Mass Murderer, about the defendants in the Brown's Chicken massacre case. Shere was one of the defense attorneys who represented Juan Luna, who received a life sentence.

A native of Cleveland, Shere graduated from Ohio University in the early 1960s with bachelor's and master's degrees in journalism. He served as publisher of Cox Newspapers in Ohio — the Dayton Daily News and Springfield News-Sun — and as general manager of Moody Bible Institute's media operations in Chicago.

In 1988, Shere was fired as Daily News publisher by Cox Newspapers because he rejected a health lecture advertisement by homosexual groups. Shere cited his "Christian perspective" in declining to print the ad. The Southern Baptist Convention subsequently passed a resolution calling on "all media to refuse advertising that promotes homosexuality or any other lifestyle that is destructive to the family". The resolution said Shere was fired for his "commitment to defend traditional moral and family values". The company responded that it was defending freedom of expression for all people, saying "We cannot compromise on the constitutional issue of equal access to the press".

In 2000, Shere began attending law school. He graduated from the DePaul University College of Law in Chicago and passed the Illinois bar exam in 2003. He formerly served as an assistant public defender in Kane County, Illinois.
