= John Calhoun Baker University Center =

Ohio University building

Coordinates: 39°19′29″N 82°06′06″W

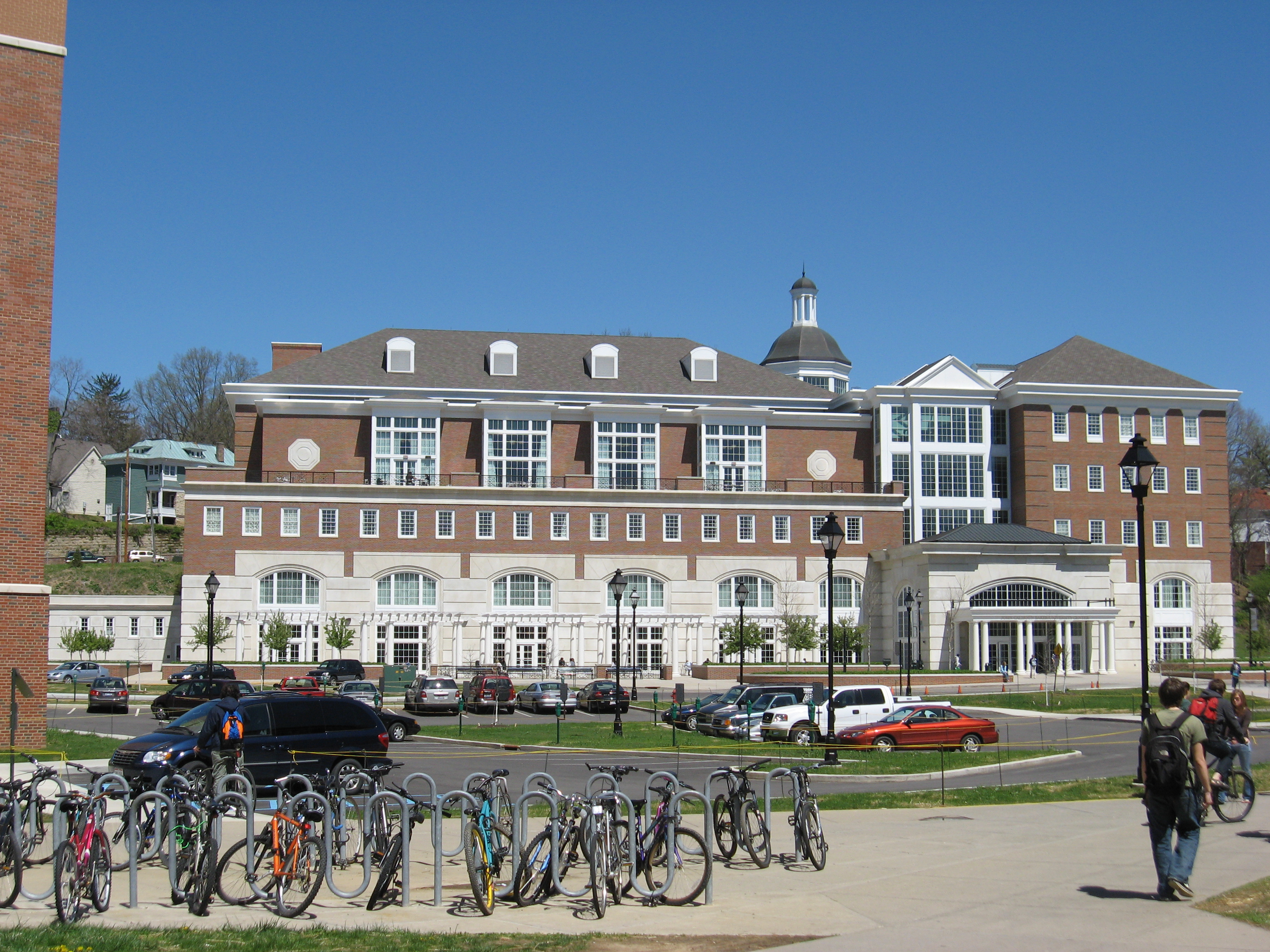
Exterior of Baker Center

The John Calhoun Baker University Center is the student union building of Ohio University, located near the center of the main campus in Athens, Ohio. With many campus offices inside, it is a building that serves the Ohio University student body. It was constructed along a riparian hillside which had been cut by the Hocking River before the river was rerouted by the United States Army Corps of Engineers.

Named for Ohio University’s 14th President, John Calhoun Baker, the Center opened in January 2007. It replaced the original Baker University Center, which was renovated as the Schoonover Center housing the Scripps College of Communication. The building provides facilities, programs, services and amenities that serve the University community, the Athens, Ohio community and visitors. It is operated by the Ohio University Division of Student Affairs.

== History ==
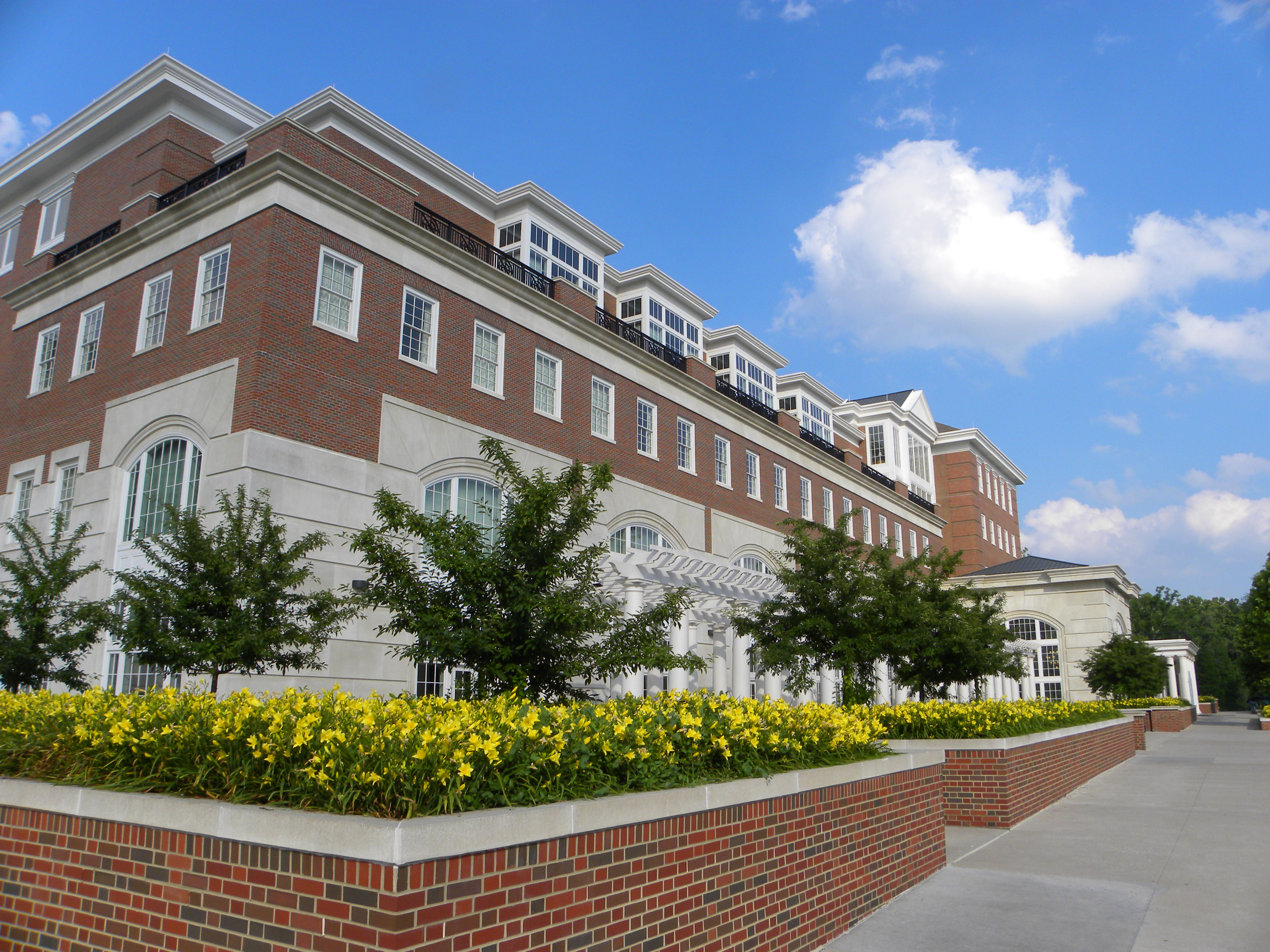
Ohio University Baker University Center

In 2000, the university's Student senate gauged interest for a new student activity center to replace the then-current Baker Center, on Union Street in the northernmost area of campus. The new building, which would be named Baker University Center, would be located more centrally on campus, and allow easier access from the lower areas of campus to the Court Street and College Green areas. Plans for the five-story building were approved in February 2004 by Ohio University's Board of Trustees. The US$60 million project was funded by state capital improvement funds and bonds. Students of the university would pay an additional fee of US$60 per academic quarter after the center opened.

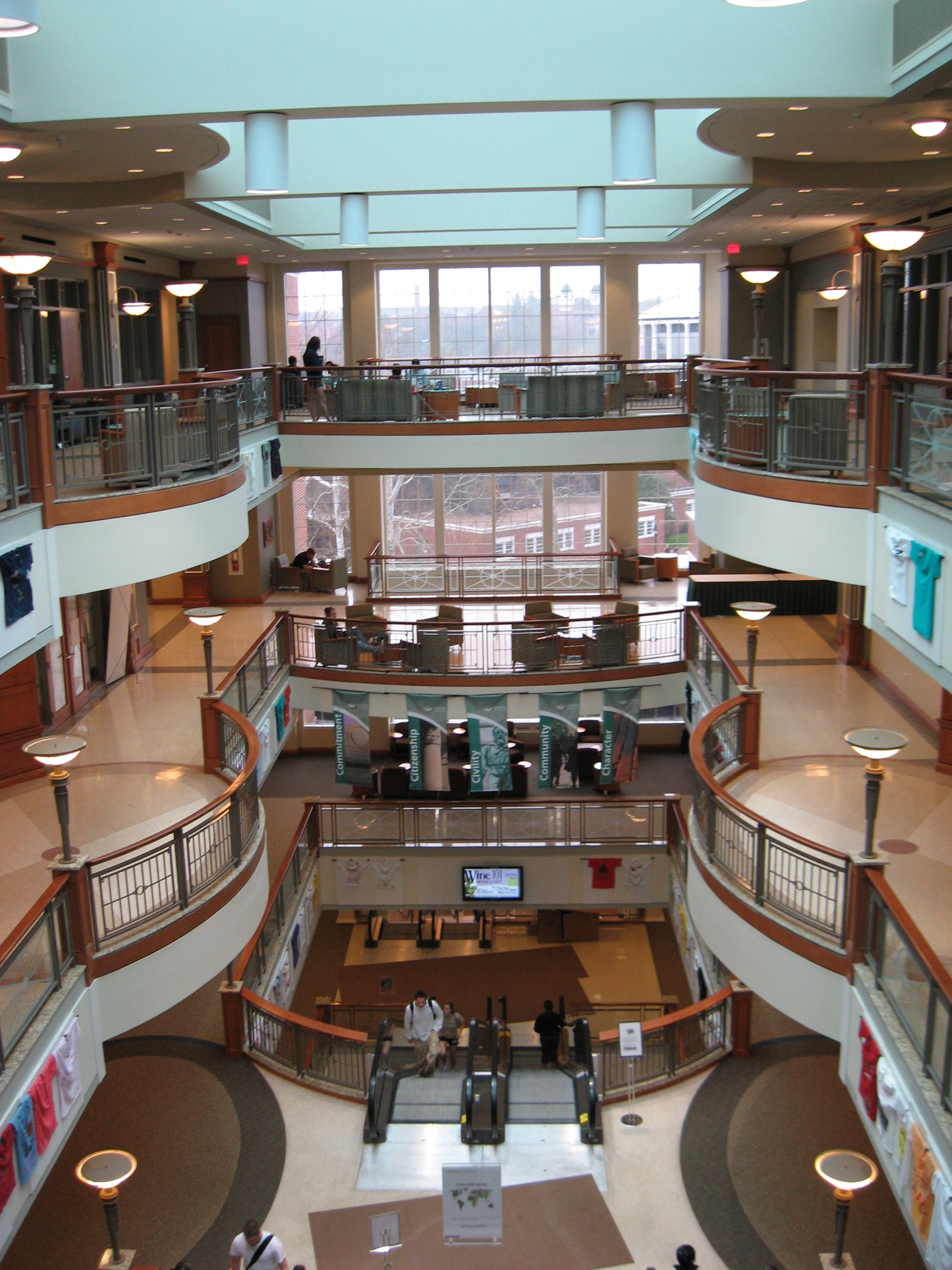
Interior of Baker Center, as seen from the top floor

The final floor plan was unveiled in March of that year. Much of the design of the building was created based on student input.

The university broke ground on the center in March 2004. Throughout that summer, the land was excavated and an underground parking lot was created. While housing for many of the university's student organizations was planned before construction, additions such as the Ohio University Women's Center were added later.

== Architecture and features ==
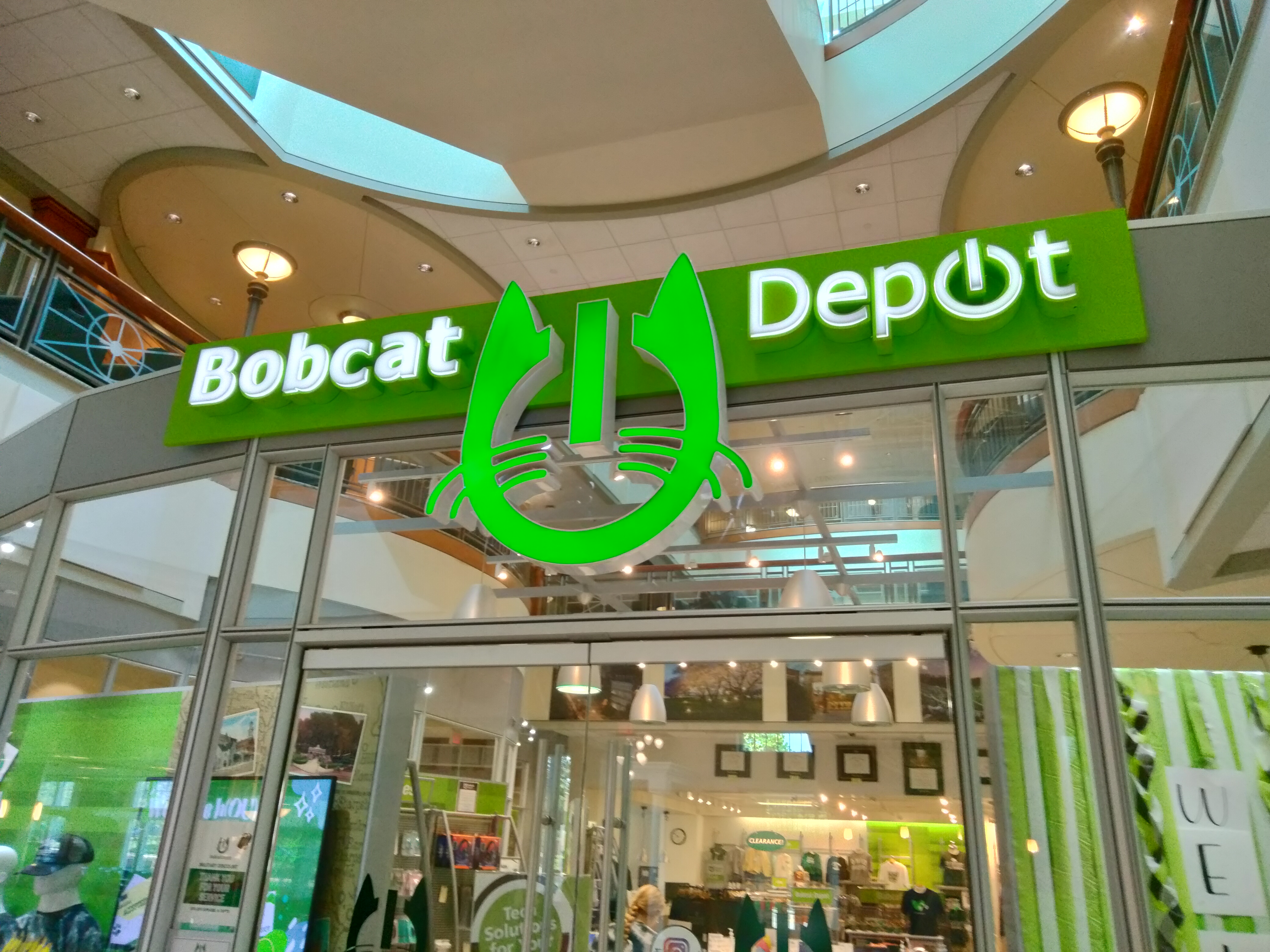
Bobcat Depot sells university gear and tech products.

The John Calhoun Baker Center (the name having been taken from the original 'Baker Center' on Union St.) opened in January, 2007. The $65 million student center upgrades the campus's traditional architectural layout with its Georgian architecture. Expansive windows throughout the building that allow a great deal of natural light to enter. Complementing the stately exterior's red brick and white columns, the contemporary interior has dramatic hallways, high ceilings, ergonomic furniture, and a color scheme of sage, plum and mocha to reflect institutional emphasis on civics.

Baker University Center has a variety of spaces that can be reserved by students, student organizations, university affiliates and external users through Baker University Center's Event Services office. These facilities include the Baker Ballroom, The formal '1804 Lounge,' The 'Bobcat Student Lounge,' The Honors Collegium, multipurpose and conference rooms, lounges, promotional tables and display spaces. Additionally, the Wall of Presidents, featuring portraits of the university's past presidents, is located in the Grand Hallway adjacent to the Baker Center Ballroom. A novel acoustical quality of the baker 'rotunda' upon entering from the Park Place entrance, is that an individual standing at the center of the hall can create an echo effect, even when whispering, due to the parabolic feature of its rounded walls, similar to the effect produced within the rotunda of the United States Capitol.

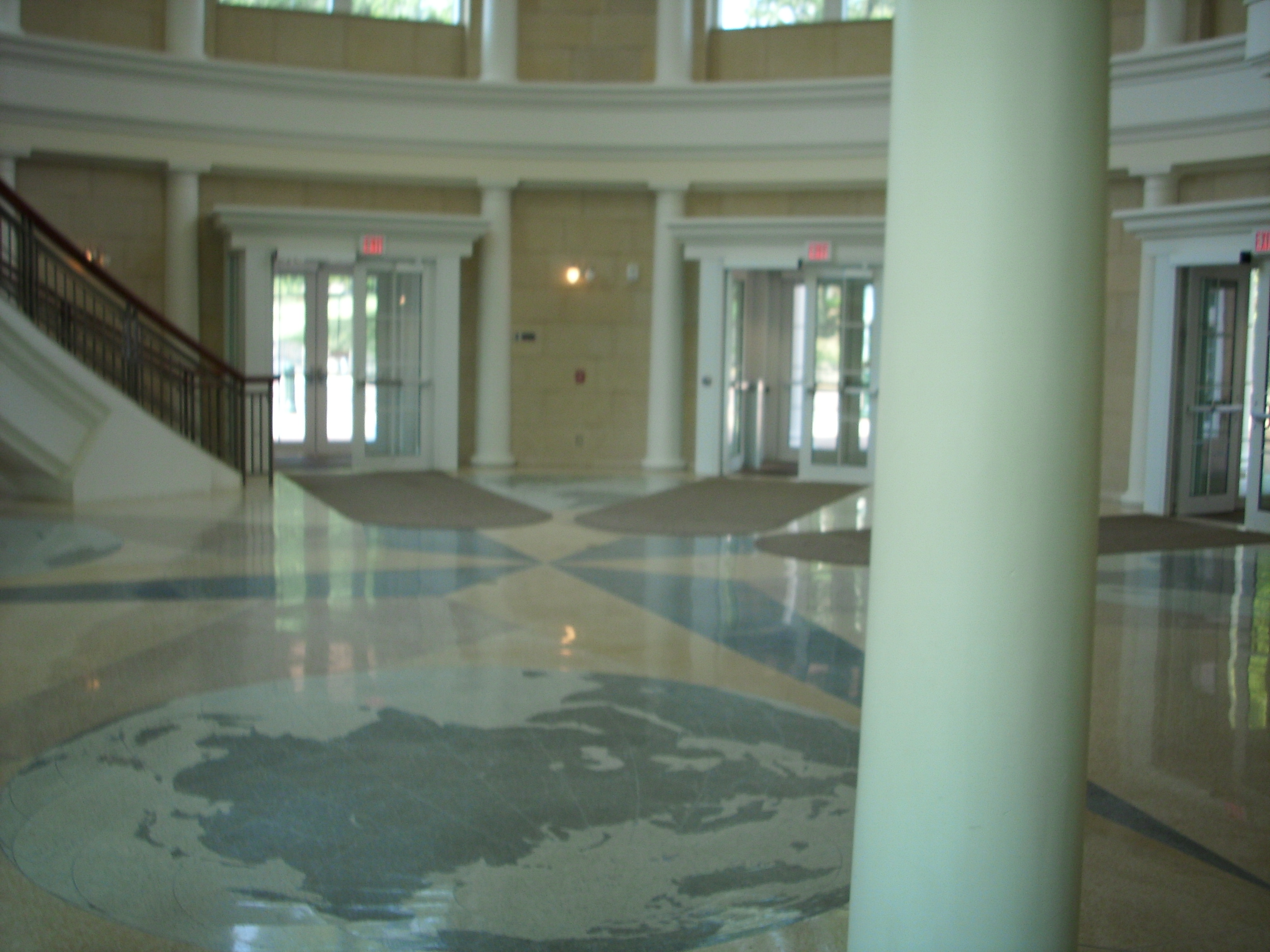
Baker Center interior at the top entrance

The six-story student center contains a large food court (West 82), a fine dining restaurant (Latitude 39), a ballroom, student shop (Bobcat Depot), coffee shop (The Front Room), theater, many study areas, several computer labs, administrative offices, and other amenities connected by three sets of escalators. The "Main Street effect" is something planners prepared for from the start by incorporating an escalator system to carry people through the atrium that cuts through the building and connects the upper and lower portions of the campus. This design feature earned the facility mention in a 2006 Association of College Unions International book as a best practice. Located on the fourth floor of Baker University Center, The Front Room Coffeehouse serves students, staff, and community members. Known to the community as simply, "Front Room," this coffee shop serves Starbucks coffee and espresso, Teavana teas, as well as food products made by the university's Culinary Services. Baker University Center also features dining venues including Latitude 39 Casual Dining and West 82 Food Court. The addition of new menu options as well as revised marketing efforts have made these venues a popular destination on campus. The venues are operated by Ohio University Culinary Services and they accept Flex Points and Bobcat Cash as well as most major credit cards.

The design of the facility has garnered several honors. In 2007, Baker University Center won two Golden Trowel awards from the International Masonry Institute, including the grand prize of Best Project in Ohio for its terrazzo floor art and another prize for its distinctive interior masonry features. In 2008, Baker University Center was awarded the grand prize with honors from Learning by Design, an organization that recognizes excellence in educational facilities. The building literally connects the historic College Green with the more contemporary parts of campus. The facility also earned the 2008 Facility Design Award from the Association of College Unions International, which annually distinguishes excellence in the design of student unions and other student-centered building on college campuses.
