= Hamilton JournalNews =

Hamilton Journal News

- The 2009-07-09 front cover of the JournalNews.
- Type: Daily newspaper
- Format: Broadsheet
- Owner: Cox Enterprises
- Ceased publication: November 1, 2013
- Language: English

Hamilton JournalNews was a daily broadsheet newspaper based in Hamilton, Ohio, and owned by Cox Media Group. The paper covered news in Hamilton and outlying areas. In September 2013, Cox Media Group Ohio announced that, effective November 1, the Hamilton JournalNews would be merged with The Middletown Journal into a new paper, the Journal-News.

== Awards ==
The Hamilton JournalNews brought award-winning news and information to readers in the Hamilton area since 1886. More than once it was named Best Newspaper in Ohio by The Ohio Society of Professional Journalists for its circulation. The paper also received the first-place General Excellence Award by the Associated Press.

== History ==
The newspaper has a history going back to 1879:

- Dec. 11, 1879 debut of the Hamilton Daily News
- Dec. 20, 1886 debut of the Daily Democrat (an upgrade of the weekly Butler County Democrat)
- June 18, 1902 debut of the Hamilton Daily Sun
- Aug. 12, 1907 merger of dailies Democrat and Sun form the Hamilton Democrat-Sun
- Jan. 8, 1908 name change of Democrat-Sun to Hamilton Evening Journal, the Evening Journal becomes one of 18 charter members of the Associated Press
- Feb. 6, 1933 merger of the Evening Journal and Daily News to form the Hamilton Journal-News
- Nov. 1, 2013 merger of dailies Hamilton JournalNews and Middletown Journal into the new Journal-News.
