= The Western Star (Ohio) =

Defunct American weekly newspaper

- Type: Weekly newspaper
- Format: Broadsheet
- Founded: February 13, 1807
- Ceased publication: January 17, 2013
- Headquarters: Ohio, U.S.

The Western Star was a weekly newspaper published for 206 years, from February 13, 1807, to January 17, 2013. It had been the oldest weekly newspaper in Ohio, second oldest of any sort in Ohio after the daily Chillicothe Gazette, and the oldest paper bearing its original name published west of the Appalachian Mountains until it ceased publication with its January 17, 2013 printed edition. It had been published on Thursdays by Cox Media Group Ohio, the communications company founded by former Ohio governor James Middleton Cox. Its coverage area was primarily Lebanon and southern Warren County.

The Western Star for most of its history was a paid-circulation paper and became a free saturation paper in the early 2000s. The paper, based in Lebanon, Ohio for more than 200 years, closed its Lebanon office in 2010 as part of a consolidation of Cox Media Group Ohio's weekly newspaper facilities to Liberty Township, Butler County, Ohio.

In November, 2012, Cox Media Group announced in a letter to advertisers that the paper would be combined with other Cox weeklies the Pulse-Journal and the Fairfield Echo into "The Pulse of Warren County" and "The Pulse of Butler County" beginning with the January 20, 2013 print editions. According to CMG, these are "two brand new weekly newspapers delivered to communities currently served by The Western Star, Fairfield Echo, and The Pulse-Journal" and "The Pulse county news editions will replace The Western Star." Subsequently, company representatives announced that the papers would be branded "Today's Pulse of Warren County, a product of The Western Star" and "Today's Pulse of Butler County, a product of the Fairfield Echo." An article (FAQ) on the Cox weeklies' websites during the week of January 13, 2013 stated, "The final issues of The Western Star, Fairfield Echo and the Pulse-Journal editions was on Thursday, January 17, 2013."

== Founding and ownership ==
It was first published February 13, 1807 by John McLean (1785-1861), who eventually became an associate justice of the United States Supreme Court. For a century, no copy was known of the first issue, the paper itself lacking a copy. However, one eventually was found in the archives of the American Antiquarian Society in Worcester, Massachusetts.

McLean sold the paper in 1810 to his brother, Nathaniel McLean. Over the next four years, Nathaniel partnered successively with the Rev. Adjet McGuire, Samuel H. Hale, Henry Lazier, Joseph Henderson, and William Blackburn. In 1814, Nathaniel sold his interest to his brother William McLean (1794-1863) who published it with Blackburn until 1816, when Blackburn departed.

In 1817, William McLean sold to Abram Van Vleet, a justice of the peace, and John Eddy (1762-1824). Later that year they took on William A. Camron (died 1838) as a partner. Eddy left that year, replaced by a man named Cunningham who did not last the year. In 1825, Van Vleet and Eddy sold to Anthony Howard Dunlavy, an attorney who served in the Ohio General Assembly and as Warren County prosecutor, and William A. Sellers, a member of the General Assembly in 1838. In 1827, they sold the paper to Camron and Jacob Morris, who was married to Dunlavy's sister and later was Warren County treasurer. In 1828, Camron sold to Dunlavy, who was partners with his brother-in-law until 1829 when Morris assumed sole control. Morris took on an apprentice circa 1830, William H. P. Denny. He became Morris's partner, and in 1834, sole owner.

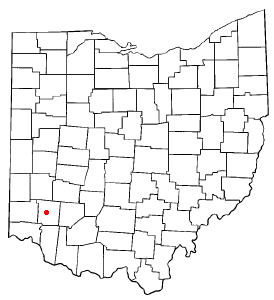
Location of Lebanon

In 1858, Denny sold his interest and left town. The new owner was Dr. James Scott, who served in the Ohio General Assembly, followed by William H. Corwin, son of the founder of Lebanon, and, by the late 1860s, Seth W. Brown, an attorney who later served as Warren County prosecutor. The paper at this time was a Republican journal.

On January 19, 1871, Brown sold to William C. McClintock (born 1845) and Clements Hardy. McClintock assumed sole ownership on January 16, 1873. He published the paper, then a seven-column quarto, and introduced steam printing presses. He owned the paper until circa 1893 when ownership was assumed by a corporation, the Western Star Publishing Company, which was controlled by McClintock until 1907, when John M. Mulford took over and owned it until 1921. In May 1902, a linotype machine to set type was introduced. On September 6, 1923, the Brown Publishing Company, the company owned by Congressman Clarence J. Brown, bought the paper and owned it until 1998.

Brown's first act was to appoint as editor and publisher Gardner H. Townsley (circa 1897–1967), whose claim to fame was having been the Rev. Norman Vincent Peale's college roommate. He expanded the paper from twelve to sixteen pages. He subsequently served as publisher over a succession of editors: Warren Nelson, Ed Thompson, Jamyes Myers, and David Schneider. Townsley served as publisher until his death.

His son Robert N. Townsley (died April 17, 1994) replaced him as publisher, with Schneider continuing as editor. In October 1968, Townsley was replaced by William Kreeger, who had the title "general manager" until March 1970 when he was named publisher. Janet Goode became editor in January 1970 and served until October of that year when she was replaced by John Nichols. Nichols served until August 1971 when Joe Falter became editor. Falter served until he retired in 1994. Thomas Barr served as Western Star editor from 1994 until 2008. In 1990, Fred Gibson became publisher and served until the paper's sale in 1998. Under both Falter and Barr, through 2007 the paper earned many first or second place honors in General Excellence in the Ohio Newspaper Association Hooper Awards, and in 2007 the paper earned third place nationwide in the Best Non-Daily contest by the national Suburban Newspapers of America.

In the 1998, Brown traded The Western Star along with the Star Press in Springboro, Today's Express in Morrow, the Monroe Times, and the Miamisburg-West Carrollton News to The Thomson Corporation, a Canadian newspaper company known for the poor quality of its publications, in exchange for three daily papers, the Piqua Daily Call, the Xenia Daily Gazette, and the Greenville Daily Advocate. When the company decided to exit the newspaper business, Thomson sold The Western Star to Cox on September 1, 2000, though only after Thomson's original plans to sell the paper to Gannett, owner of The Cincinnati Enquirer, fell apart. From late 1991 to January 13, 2013, the paper issued a free Sunday edition, although for its last few years it contained exclusively advertising. Under Cox it surrendered its second class mailing permit, ceased its distribution in the southern part of Warren County, and began to be distributed free to homes in Lebanon and Turtlecreek Township.

== Publication history ==
The paper was first published on Friday, February 13, 1807, under the name The Western Star and continued to Saturday, August 10, 1822, when it merged with another weekly, The Lebanon Gazette. Effective with the issue of Saturday, August 17, 1822, it assumed the name The Western Star and Lebanon Gazette, continuing under that name until Saturday, June 12, 1824. With the issue of Saturday, June 19, 1824, it shortened its name to the Star and Gazette, continuing under that name until the issue of Monday, September 5, 1825.

With the issue of Monday, September 13, 1825, it went back to the old name, The Western Star and Lebanon Gazette and published under that title until the issue of Saturday, July 26, 1828. Effective Saturday, August 2, 1828, the name was shortened back to The Western Star and continued until Thursday, October 27, 1859. With the issue of Thursday, November 3, 1859, the titled changed to The Weekly Western Star. By 1866, the word weekly was dropped but with the issue of Thursday, January 26, 1871, it was once more The Weekly Western Star until Thursday, December 26, 1872. Weekly was once more dropped with the Thursday, January 2, 1873, issue.

It continued under this name until Thursday, February 16, 1893, the paper that week merging with another paper called The Lebanon Gazette. As of Thursday, February 23, 1893, the paper appeared as The Western Star and Lebanon Gazette until Thursday, January 12, 1899. The title was shortened back to The Western Star effective with the issue of Thursday, January 19, 1899, and continued as a weekly until the issue of Thursday, August 29, 1935. The following Monday, September 2, 1935, the paper began a brief existence as a daily, publishing every day except Sundays. This continued to Thursday, December 31, 1936. The following week it resumed its existence as a weekly with the issue of Thursday, January 7, 1937. That issue also marked a change in the name of the paper to The Western Star and Lebanon Patriot with its absorption of another weekly, The Lebanon Patriot. The title went back to The Western Star with the issue of Thursday, July 7, 1938.

The paper then switched its publication day to Wednesday but returned to Thursdays circa 2002.
