= The Middletown Journal =

- Type: Daily newspaper
- Format: Broadsheet
- Founded: January 12, 1857 (as the Western Journal)

The Middletown Journal was a morning newspaper published in Middletown, Ohio, United States seven days a week by Cox Media Group. The paper was printed at Cox's plant in Franklin, Ohio, and distributed in Butler and Warren Counties. In September 2013, Cox Media Group Ohio announced that The Middletown Journal would cease to exist effective November 1, 2013, when the paper was merged with the Hamilton JournalNews into a new publication, the Journal-News.

The paper was first published January 12, 1857, as the Western Journal, a weekly paper issued on Thursday mornings, by C.H. Brock, a Middletown grocer. The name was changed to the Middletown Journal in 1859. Publication was suspended during the American Civil War, but resumed by 1871, when Brock sold the paper to E.T. Hardraker. The paper went through a series of owners, including George H. McKee and James L. Raymond. In 1880, W.H. Todhunter acquired the paper and made it a Republican journal. Todhunter began daily publication of the paper in 1890. The first Sunday edition was published on September 4, 1921. In 1924, the paper was purchased by Chew Publications, the owner of the Xenia Gazette.

In 1928, the paper purchased the other daily in Middletown, the Middletown News-Signal. The Journal was published as an evening paper chiefly distributed in the city and the News-Signal operated as a morning paper distributed to outlying areas. The two papers published a combined Sunday edition, the Sunday News-Journal. Chew owned the paper until 1978, when the company merged with the Thomson Corporation, the Canadian newspaper giant. When Thomson decided to exit the newspaper business, it reached a deal to sell the Journal, the Hamilton JournalNews, and several weekly papers in southwest Ohio to Gannett, the parent of The Cincinnati Enquirer. However, Cox Newspapers, the parent of the Dayton Daily News and the Springfield News-Sun, had an option on Thomson's properties and the papers were instead sold to Cox. The sale was completed September 2, 2000.

Over the years, the newspaper has been recognized by the Associated Press for photography, sports and headline writing. It has also won first-place awards from the Associated Press for Breaking News, Best Feature Writer and Best Sports Radio.

Its website was MiddletownJournal.com and featured local breaking news from Middletown, Monroe, Trenton, and Franklin.
